= List of airports in Prince Edward Island =

This is a list of airports in Prince Edward Island. It includes all Nav Canada certified and registered water and land airports, aerodromes and heliports in the Canadian province of Prince Edward Island. Airport names in italics are part of the National Airports System.

Prince Edward Island

== List of airports and heliports ==
The list is sorted by the name of the community served; click the sort buttons in the table header to switch listing order.

Community	Airport name	PU PR MI	AOE (Note: An airport of entry has four different categories. An AOE which can accept "all classes of scheduled and non-scheduled aircraft (passenger and cargo)." An AOE/# which can handle aircraft in the previous category but up to maximum number. This number can be exceeded if done in stages as shown in parentheses. An AOE/15 that can accept general aviation aircraft with a maximum of 15 passengers. An AOE/CAN which can handle aircraft subject to the CANPASS regulations.)	Operator	Elevation	ICAO	TC LID	IATA	Image	Coordinates
Cable Head	Cable Head Airpark	PR		Michael Whitty	94 ft (29 m)		CCA3			46°26′36″N 62°35′29″W
Charlottetown	Charlottetown Airport	PU	60 (368); 15 (Note: Seaplanes only.)	Charlottetown Airport Authority	167 ft (51 m)	CYYG		YYG		46°17′24″N 63°07′16″W
Charlottetown	Charlottetown (Queen Elizabeth Hospital) Heliport	PR		Queen Elizabeth Hospital	20 ft (6.1 m)		CDV3			46°15′20″N 63°05′56″W
Summerside	Summerside Airport	PU	CANPASS	Slemon Park Corporation	56 ft (17 m)	CYSU		YSU		46°26′26″N 63°50′01″W
Summerside	Summerside (Prince County Hospital) Heliport	PR		Health PEI	39 ft (12 m)		CCH6			46°25′04″N 63°46′26″W

== Defunct airports ==
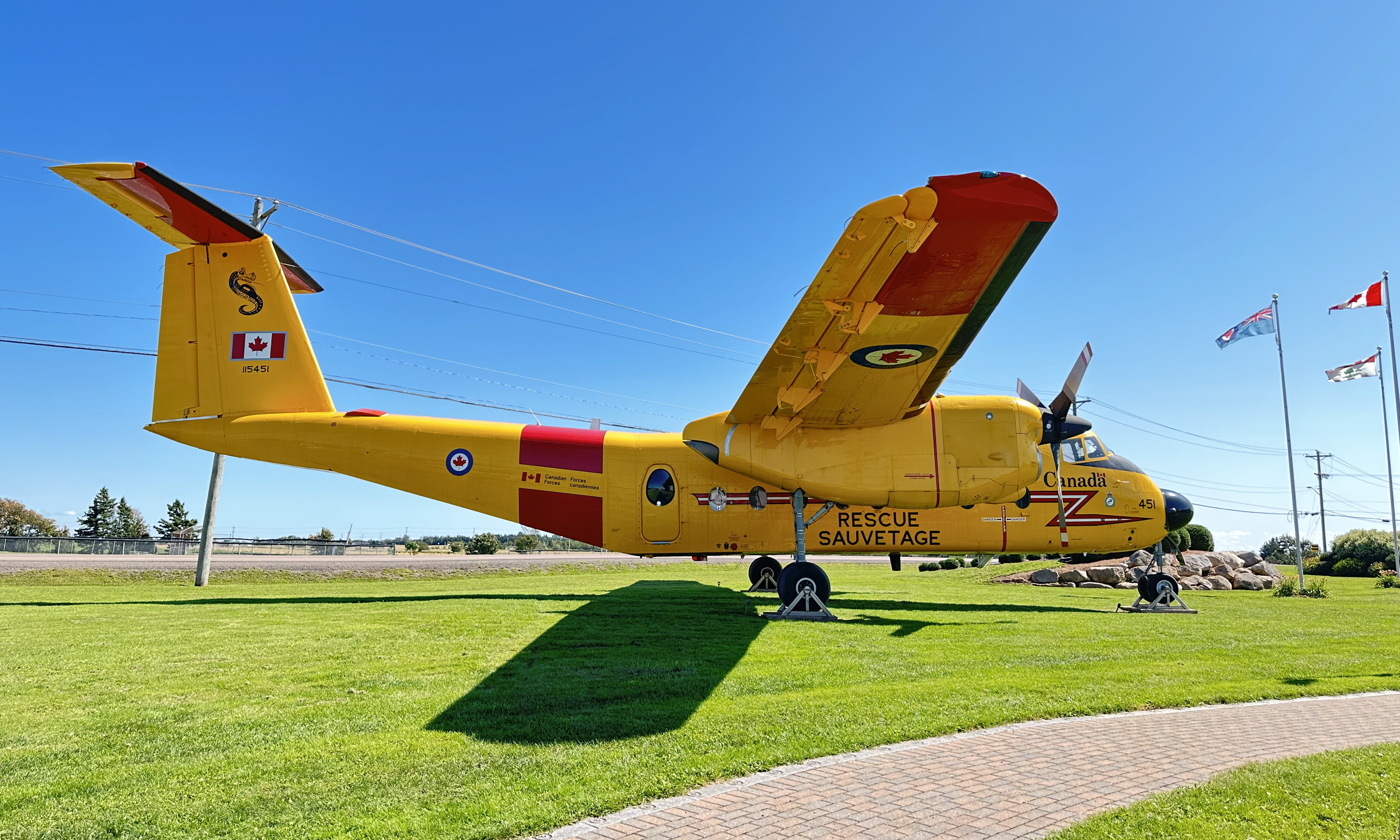
RCAF de Havilland Canada CC-115 Buffalo in Summerside

Community	Airport name	ICAO	TC LID	IATA	Coordinates
Grand River	Grand River Airport		CCA9		46°28′51″N 063°57′10″W
Mount Pleasant	RCAF Station Mount Pleasant				46°35′54″N 064°00′24″W
St. Eleanors	CFB Summerside				46°26′35″N 063°49′49″W
Sherwood	RCAF Station Charlottetown				46°17′40″N 063°07′26″W
