= Prince Edward Island Route 12 =

Highway in Prince Edward Island, Canada

Route 12

Route information
- Maintained by the Department of Transportation, Infrastructure, and Energy
- Length: 112 km (70 mi)

Major junctions
- South end: Route 11 in Miscouche
- Route 2 in Miscouche; Route 2 in Portage; Route 2 in Tignish
- North end: North Cape Hiking Trail in Tignish

Location
- Country: Canada
- Province: Prince Edward Island
- Counties: Prince

Highway system
- Provincial highways in Prince Edward Island
← Route 11	→ Route 13

Route 12 is a 112 km (70 mi), two-lane, uncontrolled-access, secondary highway in western Prince Edward Island, Canada. Its southern terminus is at Route 11 in Miscouche and its northern terminus is at the North Cape Hiking Trail in Tignish. The route parallels Route 2 as it travels toward the North Cape.

== Route description ==
The route begins at its southern terminus, goes north, and turns left near Rosehill. It crosses the Grand River and turns right in the community of the same name. It continues north and turns left in Low Point. Two left turns in Foxley River lead to a 2.7 km (1.7 mi) concurrency with Route 2 between Portage and West Devon. Two bridges over the Trout and Mill rivers lead to a right turn into Alberton. Travelling further north up the north coast of the island, the route crosses the Kildare River and goes by Tignish before ending at the North Cape Hiking Trail.

== Junction list ==
The entire route is in Prince County.

Location	km	mi	Destinations	Notes
	0.0	0.0	Route 11 – Linkletter, St. Nicholas	Southern terminus
Miscouche	1.5	0.93	Route 2 (Main Street) – Tignish, Summerside	
Rosehill	5.7	3.5	Route 123 (Belmont Road)	
	8.2	5.1	Route 123 (Lyle Road)	
	14.1	8.8	Route 122 (Allen Road) – Day's Corner	
Grand River	19.0	11.8	Route 127 / Route 131 (Sunnyside Road) – Richmond, Wellington	Southern terminus of concurrency with Route 131
Grand River	19.6	12.2	Route 131 – Arlington	Northern terminus of concurrency with Route 131
Birch Hill	26.6	16.5	Route 131 – Arlington	
Birch Hill	29.0	18.0	Route 132 (Northam Road) – Northam	
Tyne Valley	34.8	21.6	Route 169 (Port Hill Station Road) to Route 167 (Allen Road) – Mount Pleasant, Northam	
Tyne Valley	35.3	21.9	Route 166 (Bideford Road) – Bideford	
Ellerslie-Bideford	38.3	23.8	Route 166 (Bideford Road) – Bideford	
Ellerslie-Bideford	38.4	23.9	Route 133 (Ellerslie Road) – Mount Pleasant	
East Bideford	40.5	25.2	Route 163 (East Bideford Road) – East Bideford, Lennox Island	
Poplar Grove	41.8	26.0	Route 134 (McNeills Mills Road) – McNeills Mills	
Freeland	46.7	29.0	Route 173 (Milligan Wharf Road) – Milligan Wharf	
Freeland	47.0	29.2	Route 174 (Murray Road) – Murray Road	
Freeland	47.8	29.7	Route 175 (Conway Road) – Conway	
Foxley River	50.6	31.4	Route 168 (Canadian Road)	
Portage	56.0	34.8	Route 2 (Veterans Memorial Highway) – Summerside	Southern terminus of concurrency with Route 2
Portage	58.7	36.5	Route 2 (Veterans Memorial Highway) – Tignish	Northern terminus of concurrency with Route 2
Roxbury	62.8	39.0	Route 137 (Trout River Road) – Carleton	
Cascumpec	64.8	40.3	Route 142 (Kelly Road) – Woodstock, O'Leary	
Cascumpec	68.7	42.7	Route 136 (Mill Road) – Mill Road, Woodstock	
Cascumpec	70.7	43.9	Route 172 (Fortune Cove Road) – Fortune Cove	
Union	76.9	47.8	Route 145 (Mill River East Road) – Brooklyn	
Union–Alberton line	77.3	48.0	Route 150 (Dock Road) – Elmsdale	
Alberton	78.7	48.9	Route 152 (Main Street) – Tignish, Northport	
Central Kildare	87.3	54.2	Route 154 (Pridham Road) – Montrose	
Central Kildare	87.9	54.6	Route 162 (O'Rourke Road) – Greenmount	
Tignish	99.2	61.6	Dalton Avenue	Former Route 2 west
Seacow Pond	105	65	Route 161 (Broderick Road) – Christopher Cross	
Seacow Pond	108	67	Route 182 (Nelligan Road) – Norway	
Seacow Pond	112	70	North Cape hiking trail	Northern terminus of route
1.000 mi = 1.609 km; 1.000 km = 0.621 mi: Concurrency terminus
