= Lot 6, Prince Edward Island =

Lot 6
- Township
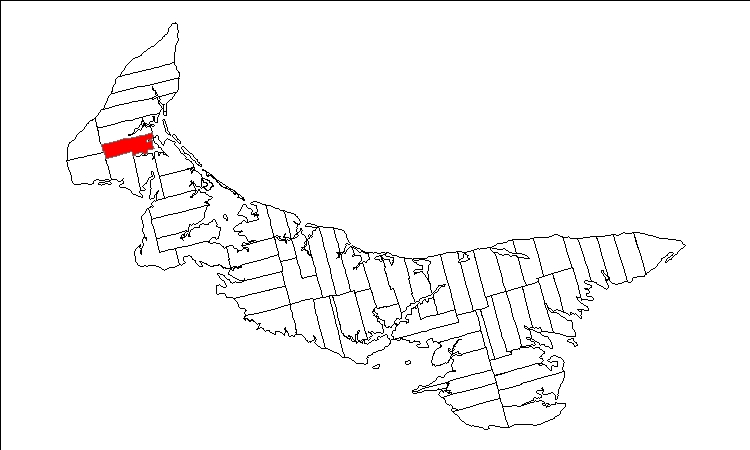
- Map of Prince Edward Island highlighting Lot 6
- Coordinates: 46°43′N 64°10′W
- Country: Canada
- Province: Prince Edward Island
- County: Prince County
- Parish: Egmont Parish

Area
  - Total: 72.94 km^{2} (28.16 sq mi)

Population (2016)
  - Total: 815
  - Density: 11.6/km^{2} (30/sq mi)
- Time zone: UTC-4 (AST)
  - Summer (DST): UTC-3 (ADT)
- Canadian Postal code: C0B
- Area code: 902
- NTS Map: 021I09
- GNBC Code: BAEQS

Lot 6 is a township in Prince County, Prince Edward Island, Canada. It is part of Egmont Parish. Lot 6 was awarded to William Crowle in the 1767 land lottery.

== Communities ==
Incorporated municipalities:

- O'Leary

Civic address communities:

- Carleton
- Cascumpec
- Coleman
- Forestview
- Fortune Cove
- Howlan
- Knutsford
- Mount Royal
- O'Leary
- Roxbury
- Unionvale
- West Devon
- Woodstock

== Demographics ==
Historical population
Year	Pop.	±%
1871	769	—
1881	1,100	+43.0%
1891	1,446	+31.5%
1901	1,322	−8.6%
1911	1,306	−1.2%
1921	1,257	−3.8%
1931	1,426	+13.4%
1941	1,510	+5.9%
2016	815	−46.0%
