= Lot 10, Prince Edward Island =

Township in Canada

Lot 10
- Township
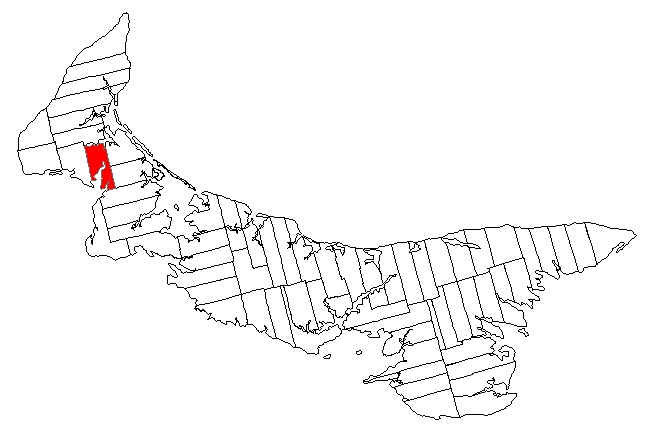
- Map of Prince Edward Island highlighting Lot 10
- Coordinates: 46°38′N 64°5′W
- Country: Canada
- Province: Prince Edward Island
- County: Prince County
- Parish: Halifax Parish

Area
  - Total: 70.21 km^{2} (27.11 sq mi)

Population (2006)
  - Total: 304
  - Density: 4.3/km^{2} (11/sq mi)
- Time zone: UTC-4 (AST)
  - Summer (DST): UTC-3 (ADT)
- Canadian Postal code: C0B
- Area code: 902
- NTS Map: 021I09
- GNBC Code: BAEQW

Lot 10 is a township in Prince County, Prince Edward Island, Canada. It is part of Halifax Parish. Lot 10 was awarded to Simon Luttrell, 1st Earl of Carhampton in the 1767 land lottery. Ownership passed to John Motteux, High Sheriff of Norfolk by 1783, and to the Earl of Selkirk by 1806.

== Communities ==
Incorporated municipalities:

- Lady Slipper

Civic address communities:

- Alaska
- Carleton
- Enmore
- Inverness
- Mount Pleasant
- North Enmore
- Portage
- Roxbury
- West Devon

== Demographics ==
Historical population
Year	Pop.	±%
1871	376	—
1881	381	+1.3%
1891	440	+15.5%
1901	489	+11.1%
1911	599	+22.5%
1921	572	−4.5%
1931	480	−16.1%
1941	514	+7.1%
2006	304	−40.9%
