= Lot 8, Prince Edward Island =

Lot 8
- Township
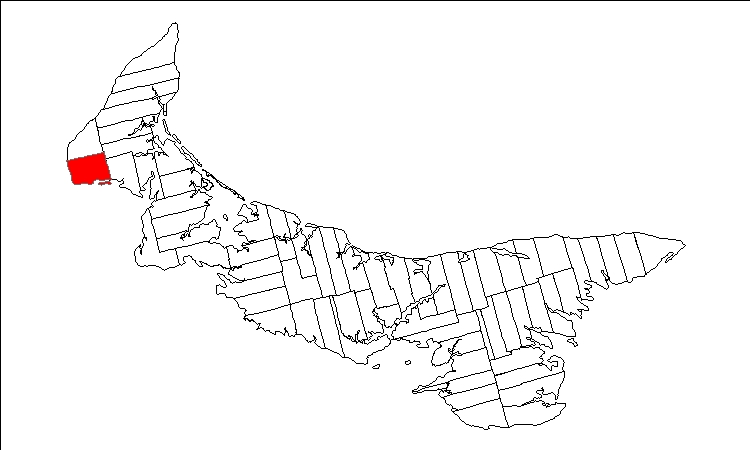
- Map of Prince Edward Island highlighting Lot 8
- Coordinates: 46°39′N 64°20′W
- Country: Canada
- Province: Prince Edward Island
- County: Prince County
- Parish: Halifax Parish

Area
  - Total: 84.29 km^{2} (32.54 sq mi)

Population (2006)
  - Total: 668
  - Density: 7.9/km^{2} (20/sq mi)
- Time zone: UTC-4 (AST)
  - Summer (DST): UTC-3 (ADT)
- Canadian Postal code: C0B
- Area code: 902
- NTS Map: 021I09
- GNBC Code: BAEQU

Lot 8 is a township in Prince County, Prince Edward Island, Canada. It is part of Halifax Parish. Lot 8 was awarded to Arnold Nisbett (M.P.) in the 1767 land lottery, passed to William Kilpatrick and Benjamin Todd in 1775, and to Todd's heirs in 1783.

It is known for the West Point Lighthouse at Cedar Dunes Provincial Park in West Point. It is also known for approximately 55 large windmills, operated by the French company Suez Energy, which is used to create electricity for sale in New England.

== Communities ==
Incorporated municipalities:

- none

Civic address communities:

- Dunblane
- Glenwood
- Hebron
- Knutsford
- Milburn
- Milo
- Mount Royal
- Springfield West
- West Cape
- West Point

== Demographics ==
Historical population
Year	Pop.	±%
1871	672	—
1881	855	+27.2%
1891	887	+3.7%
1901	896	+1.0%
1911	855	−4.6%
1921	802	−6.2%
1931	787	−1.9%
1941	815	+3.6%
2006	668	−18.0%
