= Lot 12, Prince Edward Island =

Lot 12
- Township
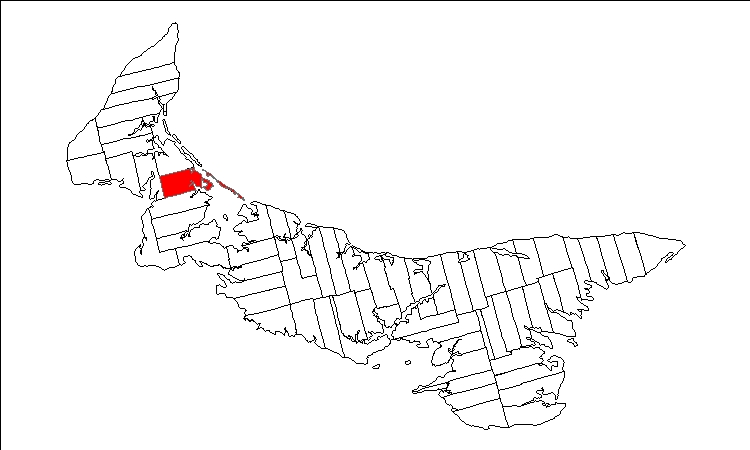
- Map of Prince Edward Island highlighting Lot 12
- Coordinates: 46°37′N 63°59′W
- Country: Canada
- Province: Prince Edward Island
- County: Prince County
- Parish: Halifax Parish

Area
  - Total: 79.51 km^{2} (30.70 sq mi)

Population (2006)
  - Total: 873
  - Density: 11/km^{2} (28/sq mi)
- Time zone: UTC-4 (AST)
  - Summer (DST): UTC-3 (ADT)
- Canadian Postal code: C0B
- Area code: 902
- NTS Map: 011L12
- GNBC Code: BAEQY

Lot 12 is a township in Prince County, Prince Edward Island, Canada. It is part of Halifax Parish. Lot 12 was awarded to merchants Hutchinson Mure and Robert Cathcart in the 1767 land lottery, and by 1806 was partially owned by the Earl of Selkirk.

== Communities ==
First Nations:

- Lennox Island First Nation

Incorporated municipalities:

- Ellerslie-Bideford
- Lady Slipper
- Lot 11 and Area

Civic address communities:

- East Bideford
- Ellerslie-Bideford
- Enmore
- Inverness
- Lennox Island
- McNeills Mills
- Mount Pleasant
- North Enmore
- Poplar Grove

== Demographics ==
Historical population
Year	Pop.	±%
1871	560	—
1881	843	+50.5%
1891	963	+14.2%
1901	917	−4.8%
1911	974	+6.2%
1921	794	−18.5%
1931	680	−14.4%
1941	851	+25.1%
2006	873	+2.6%
