= Prince Edward Island Route 142 =

Canadian highway

Coordinates: 46.717638°N 64.165443°W

Route 142
- O'Leary Road

Route information
- Maintained by Prince Edward Island Department of Transportation and Infrastructure Renewal
- Length: 24.1 km (15.0 mi)

Major junctions
- West end: Route 14 in West Cape
- Route 176 in Springfield West; Route 148 in O'Leary; Route 2 in Woodstock
- East end: Route 12 in O'Leary

Location
- Country: Canada
- Province: Prince Edward Island

Highway system
- Provincial highways in Prince Edward Island
| ← Route 141 | → Route 143 |

Prince Edward Island Route 142, known locally as O'Leary Road, is a 2-lane highway in Prince County, Prince Edward Island, Canada. The highway bisects the island approximately halfway between Summerside and Tignish, and passes through the town of O'Leary.

The route begins at Route 12 near Cascumpec, bearing east towards Woodstock. This portion of the route is known as Kelly Road, which is also the name of a locality along the route. At Woodstock, the road meets Route 2 at a roundabout, then continues to O'Leary. The route's western terminus is at Route 14 at West Cape.

The portion of Route 142 between Route 2 and the town of O'Leary is designated an arterial highway by the province. The remainder of the route is designated a local highway.
