= Lot 11, Prince Edward Island =

Township in Canada

Lot 11
- Township
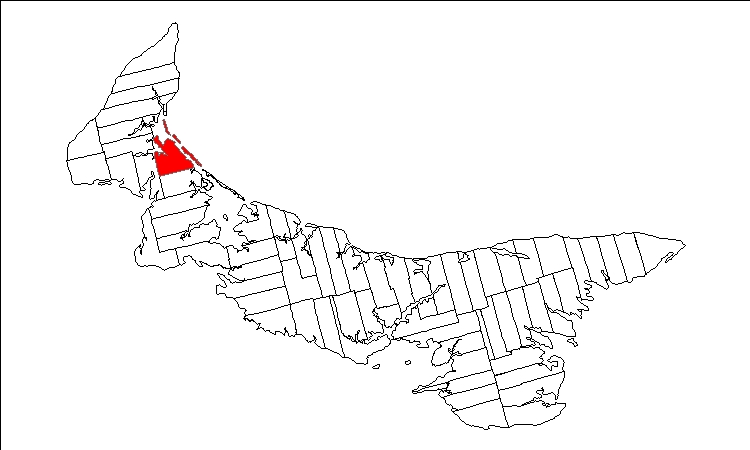
- Map of Prince Edward Island highlighting Lot 11
- Country: Canada
- Province: Prince Edward Island
- County: Prince County
- Parish: Halifax Parish
- Time zone: UTC-4 (AST)
  - Summer (DST): UTC-3 (ADT)
- Canadian Postal code: C0B
- Area code: 902

Lot 11 is a township in Prince County, Prince Edward Island, Canada. It is part of Halifax Parish. Following the Seven Years' War, Lot 11 was awarded in the land lottery of 1767 to Colonel Hunt Walsh, the commanding officer of 28th Regiment of Foot at the capture of Louisbourg and the Battle of the Plains of Abraham. While ownership remained with the heirs of Colonel Walsh, portions of the lot were leased to settlers under sequential administration by land agents James Bardin Palmer, John Large and James Warburton. In 1856, the Walsh heirs sold the lot to the colonial government for resale to leaseholders in accordance with the Land Purchase Act of 1853.

== Communities ==
Incorporated municipalities:

- Lady Slipper
- Lot 11 and Area (does not contain the entire township)

Civic address communities:

- Conway
- Foxley River
- Freeland
- Inverness
- McNeills Mills
- Murray Road
- Poplar Grove
- Portage

== Demographics ==
Historical population
Year	Pop.	±%
1871	570	—
1881	625	+9.6%
1891	700	+12.0%
1901	673	−3.9%
1911	659	−2.1%
1921	604	−8.3%
1931	702	+16.2%
1941	767	+9.3%

== Sources ==
- O'Grady, Brendan (2004). Exiles and Islanders: The Irish Settlers of Prince Edward Island. Vol. 18. McGill-Queen's Press. ISBN 0773527680.
