= Lot 9, Prince Edward Island =

Lot 9
- Township
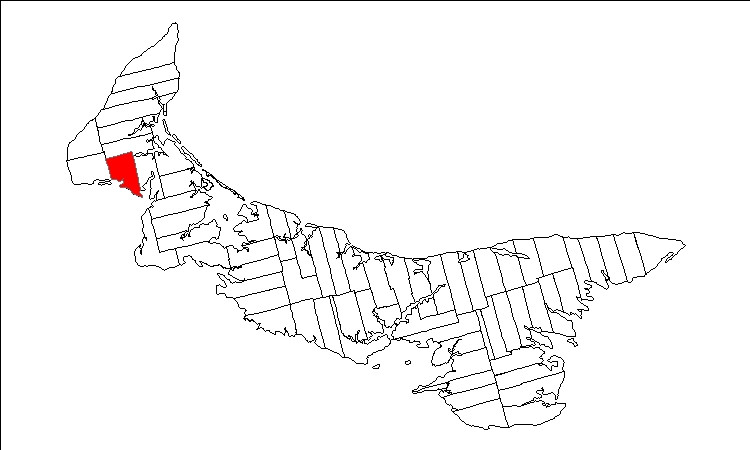
- Map of Prince Edward Island highlighting Lot 9
- Coordinates: 46°39′N 64°12′W
- Country: Canada
- Province: Prince Edward Island
- County: Prince County
- Parish: Halifax Parish

Area
  - Total: 74.15 km^{2} (28.63 sq mi)

Population (2006)
  - Total: 362
  - Density: 4.9/km^{2} (13/sq mi)
- Time zone: UTC-4 (AST)
  - Summer (DST): UTC-3 (ADT)
- Canadian Postal code: C0B
- Area code: 902
- NTS Map: 021I09
- GNBC Code: BAEQV

Lot 9 is a township in Prince County, Prince Edward Island, Canada. It is part of Halifax Parish. Lot 9 was awarded to James Murray in the 1767 land lottery.

== Communities ==
Incorporated municipalities:

- none

Civic address communities:

- Alaska
- Brae
- Carleton
- Coleman
- Derby
- Hebron
- Milburn
- Milo
- Mount Royal

== Demographics ==
Historical population
Year	Pop.	±%
1871	431	—
1881	572	+32.7%
1891	727	+27.1%
1901	787	+8.3%
1911	776	−1.4%
1921	597	−23.1%
1931	582	−2.5%
1941	646	+11.0%
2006	362	−44.0%
