= Prince Edward Island Route 11 =

Highway in Prince Edward Island, Canada

Route 11

Route information
- Maintained by the Department of Transportation, Infrastructure, and Energy
- Length: 65.5 km (40.7 mi)

Major junctions
- South end: Route 1A in Summerside
- Route 12 in Miscouche; Route 165 in Wellington; Route 177 in Mont-Carmel; Route 124 in Abrams Village; Route 126 in Egmont Bay; Route 127 in Saint Philip; Route 128 / Route 129 in Higgins Road; Route 135 in Victoria West; Route 130 in Victoria West
- North end: Route 2 in Lady Slipper

Location
- Country: Canada
- Province: Prince Edward Island
- Counties: Prince

Highway system
- Provincial highways in Prince Edward Island
← Route 10	→ Route 12

Route 11 is a 65.5 km (40.7 mi), two-lane, uncontrolled-access, secondary highway in western Prince Edward Island, Canada. Its southern terminus is at Route 1A (Read Drive) in Summerside and its northern terminus is at Route 2 in Lady Slipper.

== Route description ==
The route begins at its southern terminus and heads west through the downtown of Summerside. It continues west through Miscouche and Mont-Carmel before turning northward near Cape Egmont. It crosses the Haldimand River and turns left in Abrams Village to continue north. A left turn in Higgins Road, a right turn just north of that, and another left turn in Victoria West makes it continue north. In Enmore, the route turns right once again and ends at its northern terminus.
