= Kelly Road, Prince Edward Island =

Coordinates: 46.723°N 64.140°W

Location of Kelly Road in Prince Edward Island

Kelly Road is a settlement in Prince Edward Island. Kelly Road is also the name of the approximately 5 km length of Route 142 between Woodstock and Route 12.
