= Prince Edward Island Route 133 =

Highway in Prince Edward Island, Canada

Coordinates: 46°35′55.6″N 63°58′11.7″W

Route 133
- Ellerslie Road

Route information
- Maintained by Prince Edward Island Department of Transportation and Infrastructure Renewal

Major junctions
- From: Route 12
- To: Route 2

Location
- Country: Canada
- Province: Prince Edward Island

Highway system
- Provincial highways in Prince Edward Island

Ellerslie Road, labelled Route 133, is a 2-lane collector highway in Prince County, Prince Edward Island, Canada. It is located 4.0–8.0 kilometres (2.5–5 mi) northeast of the community of Tyne Valley and is located within the community of Ellerslie. Its maximum speed limit is 80 km/h (50 mph).

The highway runs from Route 12 (Bideford) to Route 2, the Veteran's Memorial Highway, passing through the communities of Ellerslie and Mount Pleasant.

== History ==
The western half of Ellerslie Road, from the Western Road (Route 2) inward 1.5 miles was first paved in 1975 and the remainder was paved in 1976.

== List of roads merging from Route 133 ==
- Route 12 (Lot 16 to Tignish)
- Western Rd - Route 2 (Mount Pleasant)
- Hutchinson Rd
- Dystant Rd
- Harts Gravel Rd

== See also ==
- Summerside
