= Freeland, Prince Edward Island =

Canadian rural community in Prince County, Prince Edward Island

Freeland
- Settlement
- Location of Freeland in Prince Edward Island
- Coordinates: 46°41′0″N 63°58′0″W
- Country: Canada
- Province: Prince Edward Island
- County: Prince County
- Township: Lot 11
- Municipality: Lot 11 and Area
- Elevation: 10 m (33 ft)
- Time zone: UTC-04:00 (AST)
- Postal code span: V0B
- Area codes: 902, 782

Freeland is a rural community located in the township of Lot 11, Prince County, in the Canadian province of Prince Edward Island. Freeland is approximately 11 kilometres (7 miles) north of Tyne Valley.

== History ==
Freeland was established in the mid-19th century and was originally known as Frederick Cove. The community's name commemorates the first land granted to settlers by a land owner in Prince Edward Island, marking an important shift in land ownership during the colonial era.

A post office operated in the area under the name Lot 11 from 1852 to 1914, and under the name Freeland from approximately 1886 to 1915.

== Cemetery ==
The community is home to the Freeland Presbyterian Cemetery, also known as the Freeland United Cemetery. This cemetery serves as an important historical site, containing graves dating back to the 19th century and offering insights into the early settlers of the region.

== Location ==
The community is intersected by Freeland Creek (formerly known as Eel Creek), which flows eastward and drains into the Freeland and Conway Narrows, eventually emptying into the Gulf of St. Lawrence.

== Nearby communities ==
Freeland is located near other rural communities such as Ellerslie, Alberton, and Tyne Valley. The nearest major urban center is Summerside, located 46.67 kilometres (29 miles) away by road.

== See also ==
- Lot 11 and Area
