= Lot 11 and Area =

- Community
- Location within Prince Edward Island
- Coordinates: 46°40′N 63°58′W
- Country: Canada
- Province: Prince Edward Island
- County: Prince County
- Parish: Halifax Parish
- Incorporated: 1982

Government
  - Mayor: Susan Milligan
  - Councillors: Christine Yeo; Norma Yeo; Lauren Bailey; Lowell Palmer; Sarah Perry
  - Administrator: Lisa Smith
  - Seat: Freeland

Population
  - Total: 617
- Time zone: UTC-4 (AST)
  - Summer (DST): UTC-3 (ADT)
- Canadian Postal code: C0B 1J0
- Area code: 902
- NTS Map: 021I09
- GNBC Code: BAEQX

The Municipality of Lot 11 and Area is a municipality that holds community status in Prince Edward Island, Canada. It is located within Prince County.

Despite its name being derived from the township of Lot 11, the municipality's boundaries do not include all of this township and extend into the neighbouring township of Lot 12. The municipality's seat is in the community of Freeland.

== Communities ==
This municipality contains the following communities:

Lot 11

- Conway
- Foxley River
- Freeland
- Murray Road
- Poplar Grove

Lot 12

- East Bideford
- Poplar Grove

== Demographics ==
Federal census population history of Lot 11 and Area
Year	Pop.	±%
2016	639	—
2021	617	−3.4%
Source: Statistics Canada

In the 2021 Census of Population conducted by Statistics Canada, Lot 11 and Area had a population of 617 living in 256 of its 318 total private dwellings, a change of −3.4% from its 2016 population of 639. With a land area of 102.61 km^{2} (39.62 sq mi), it had a population density of 6.0/km^{2} (15.6/sq mi) in 2021.
