= RCAF Station Mount Pleasant =

Airfield in Prince Edward Island, Canada

- Near Ellerslie, Prince Edward Island in Canada

Site information
- Owner: Dept of National Defence (Canada)

Location
- Location within Prince Edward Island
- Coordinates: 46°35′54″N 064°00′24″W

Airfield information
- Elevation: 110 feet (34 m) AMSL
Runways
| Direction | Length and surface |
|---|---|
| 2/20 | 3,048 feet (929 m) hard surface |
| 8/26 | 3,002 feet (915 m) hard surface |
| 14/32 | 2,994 feet (913 m) hard surface |

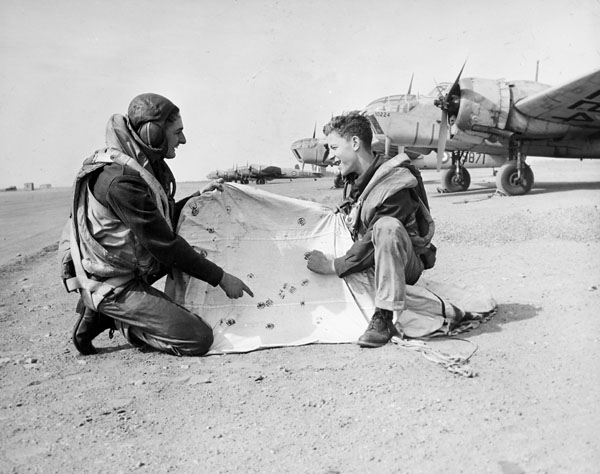
Two aircrew examining a target drogue at No. 10 Bombing and Gunnery School, RCAF, Mount Pleasant, P.E.I., 1944

RCAF Station Mount Pleasant was a Royal Canadian Air Force (RCAF) station in Mount Pleasant, Prince Edward Island, Canada. Two of its runways remain in use by members of the Experimental Aircraft Association.

== World War II ==
The aerodrome opened during World War II in 1940 under the auspices of the British Commonwealth Air Training Plan (BCATP). It was intended to serve as a relief landing field for No. 9 Service Flying Training School, which was located at nearby RCAF Station Summerside.

In September 1943, RCAF Station Mount Pleasant evolved from a relief field to a full training facility when it began hosting No. 10 Bombing and Gunnery School (B&GS). Aircraft used for this training include the Avro Anson, Fairey Battle, Bristol Bolingbroke and Westland Lysander. No. 10 B&GS ceased operation in June 1945.

The airfield was used as a storage depot for a short time before being decommissioned by the RCAF in 1947.

=== Aerodrome information ===
The airfield was constructed in the typical BCATP wartime pattern, with runways formed in a triangle. In approximately 1942 the aerodrome was listed at 46°36′N 64°00′W with a Var. 25 degrees W and elevation of 110 feet (34 m). Three runways were listed as follows:

| Runway name | Length | Width | Surface |
|---|---|---|---|
| 2/20 | 3,048 feet (929 m) | 150 feet (46 m) | Hard (asphalt) surfaced |
| 8/26 | 3,002 feet (915 m) | 150 feet (46 m) | Hard (asphalt) surfaced |
| 14-32 | 2,994 feet (913 m) | 150 feet (46 m) | Hard (asphalt) surfaced |
