= Grand River, Prince Edward Island =

Unincorporated area in Prince Edward Island, Canada

Coordinates: 46°30′30″N 63°54′42″W

Location of Grand River in Prince Edward Island

Grand River is an unincorporated area in Prince Edward Island, Canada. It is located in Prince County, northeast of Wellington. It is named for the Grand River, which it is situated upon.

The Grand River Airport, a small private airstrip, is located in the community.

== Roads ==
Grand River is served by provincial highways 12 and 131. In 2019, the provincial government announced plans to rebuild the intersection of route 12 and 131 into a roundabout designed to handle agricultural vehicles.

== Culture ==
The community hosts the Bayside Tractor Run, an annual parade or "group joyride" of tractors that has taken place since 2010.

Grand River Ranch hosts a Cowgirl Strong program that allows women and girls with a disability to learn about taking care of horses.
