= 1870 census of Manitoba =

First census conducted in Manitoba, Canada

1870 Census of Manitoba
October 27, 1870	1881 →

General information
- Country: Canada (Province of Manitoba)

Results
- Total population: 12,228

The Census of Manitoba (1870), also known as the Archibald Census, was the first census held in the province of Manitoba, and the overall first census that took place on Canadian territory since the Confederation. The census officially took place on October 27, 1870, based on information collected as of July 16 of the same year, and predates the first nationwide census by five months.

The total population count of Manitoba in 1870 was 12,228.

== Census summary ==
The 1870 census consisted of one "schedule" or census data collection form with twenty questions including sex, conjugal (marital) condition, religion, age, and birthplace. There were 6,277 males and 5,868 females identified in the census; another 83 Manitobans did not provide a response.

For census purposes, Manitoba was divided into five districts and 33 parishes:

District	Constituent Parishes	Population
District I	St. Boniface; St. Vital; St. Norbert; Ste. Agathe; Scratching River; Near the Line; Near Pembina	2,641
District II	Winnipeg; St. John; Kildonan; St. Paul; St. Andrew	1,523
District III	St. André; St. Clément; St. Peter; Scanderbury	2,910
District IV	Ste. Anne; St. James; Headingly; St. François Xavier; St. Paul; St. Charles	3,271
District V	White Mud; Rat Creek; Portage Laprairie; Westbourne Mission; Big Ridge; High Bluff; Poplar Point; Oak Point; Lake Manitoban; St. Paul-in-Bay; Long Lake	1,883
Manitoba (total)		12,228

The paper records were microfilmed and are available online at the Library and Archives Canada web site.

== See also ==
- History of Manitoba
- Population of Canada by year
- Demographics of Canada
- Ethnic groups in Canada
- History of immigration to Canada
