= Summerside Airport =

Summerside Airport CFB Summerside
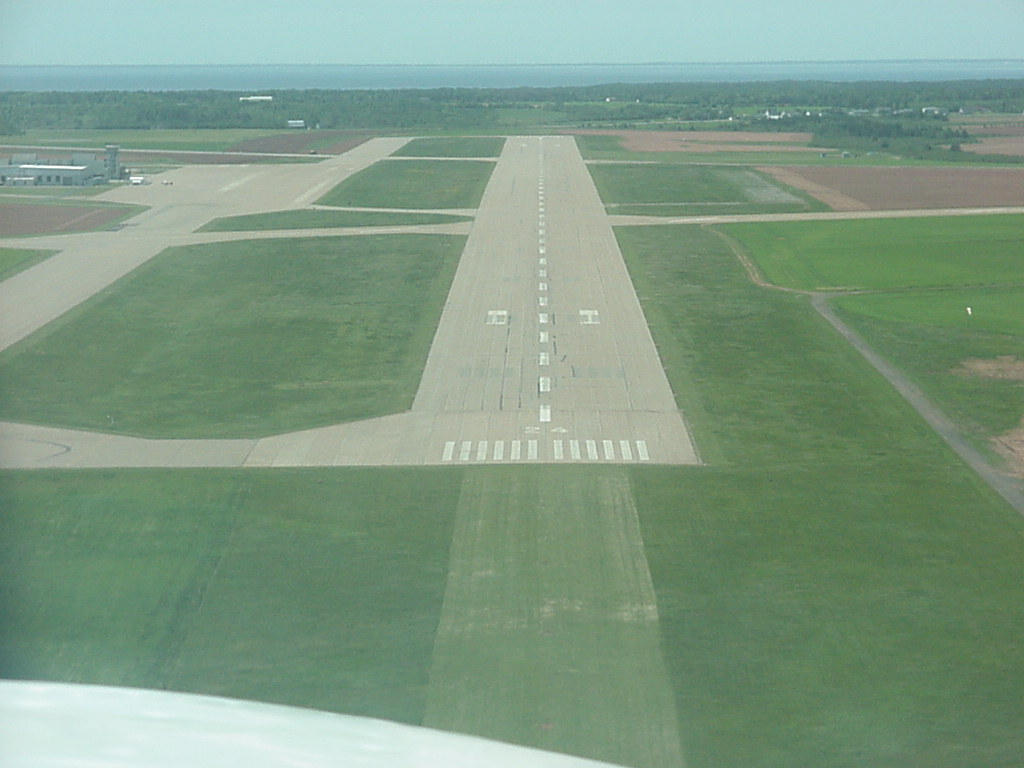
- Short final, runway 23 (then 24) in Summerside, PEI
- IATA: YSU; ICAO: CYSU; WMO: 71702

Summary
- Airport type: Public
- Operator: Slemon Park Corporation
- Location: Summerside, Prince Edward Island
- Time zone: AST (UTC−04:00)
  - Summer (DST): ADT (UTC−03:00)
- Elevation AMSL: 56 ft / 17 m
- Coordinates: 46°26′26″N 063°50′01″W

Map
- Location in Prince Edward Island CYSU (Canada)

Runways
Direction	Length		Surface
Direction	ft	m	Surface
05/23	8,000	2,438	Asphalt
- Sources: Canada Flight Supplement; Environment Canada

Summerside Airport (IATA: YSU, ICAO: CYSU) is located 3.5 nautical miles (6.5 km; 4.0 mi) north-northwest of Summerside, Prince Edward Island, Canada.

== History ==
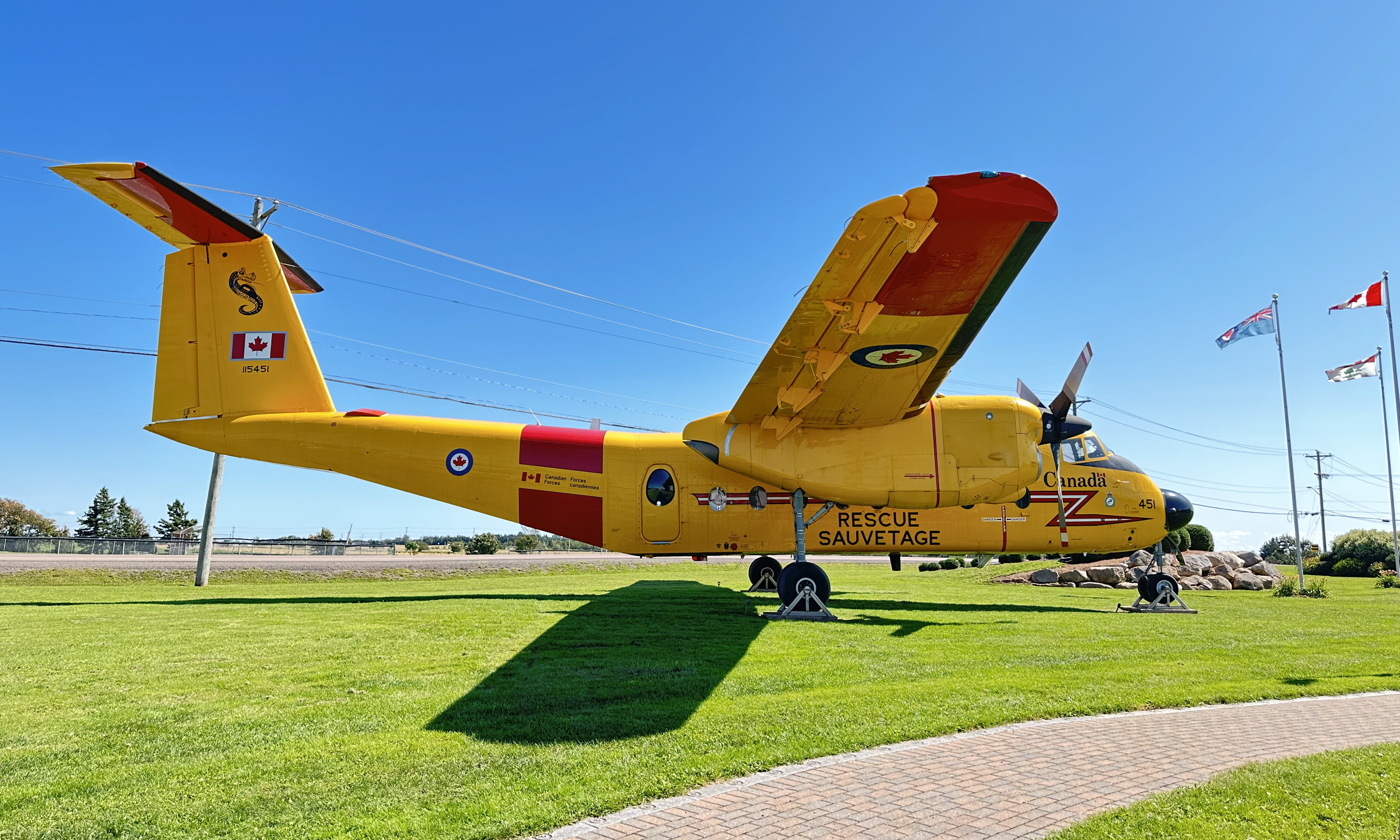
RCAF CC-115 Buffalo preserved in Summerside

The airport was formerly a military airfield, established in 1940 as RCAF Station Summerside, changing its name to CFB Summerside in 1968. The base was active in training aircrews in the British Commonwealth Air Training Plan during World War II and hosting search and rescue (SAR) and coastal surveillance units during the Cold War. CFB Summerside was closed in 1990 and transferred to a local development authority named Slemon Park Corporation. The base property is now referred to as Slemon Park and the airfield has been named Summerside Airport. The airport is home to several aircraft maintenance companies, as well as a small general aviation community.

Summerside Airport's airfield and terminal facilities are located in the township of Lot 17 and not in the city of Summerside proper; the municipal boundary is adjacent to the airport property with the city including the residential area of Slemon Park but not the airfield and industrial properties.

=== Past scheduled passenger airline service ===
The airport was served by Eastern Provincial Airways during the 1960s and early 1970s which operated nonstop flights to Moncton and the Magdalen Islands as well as direct service via a stop at the Charlottetown Airport to Halifax, Sydney, Deer Lake, Gander and St. John's with Douglas DC-3 prop aircraft and Handley Page Dart Herald turboprop aircraft.

In 1995, Atlantic Island Airways was operating Fokker F28 Fellowship jet service with nonstop flights from Ottawa as well as direct one-stop service from Toronto.

WestJet was serving the airport in 2009 with Boeing 737-700 and Boeing 737-800 jetliners but then ceased all flights into Summerside; however, WestJet continues to serve the Charlottetown Airport on Prince Edward Island.

== See also ==
- List of British Commonwealth Air Training Plan facilities in Canada
