= Cedar Dunes Provincial Park =

Provincial park in Prince Edward Island, Canada

Coordinates: 46°37′20″N 64°22′55″W

Location of Cedar Dunes in Prince Edward Island

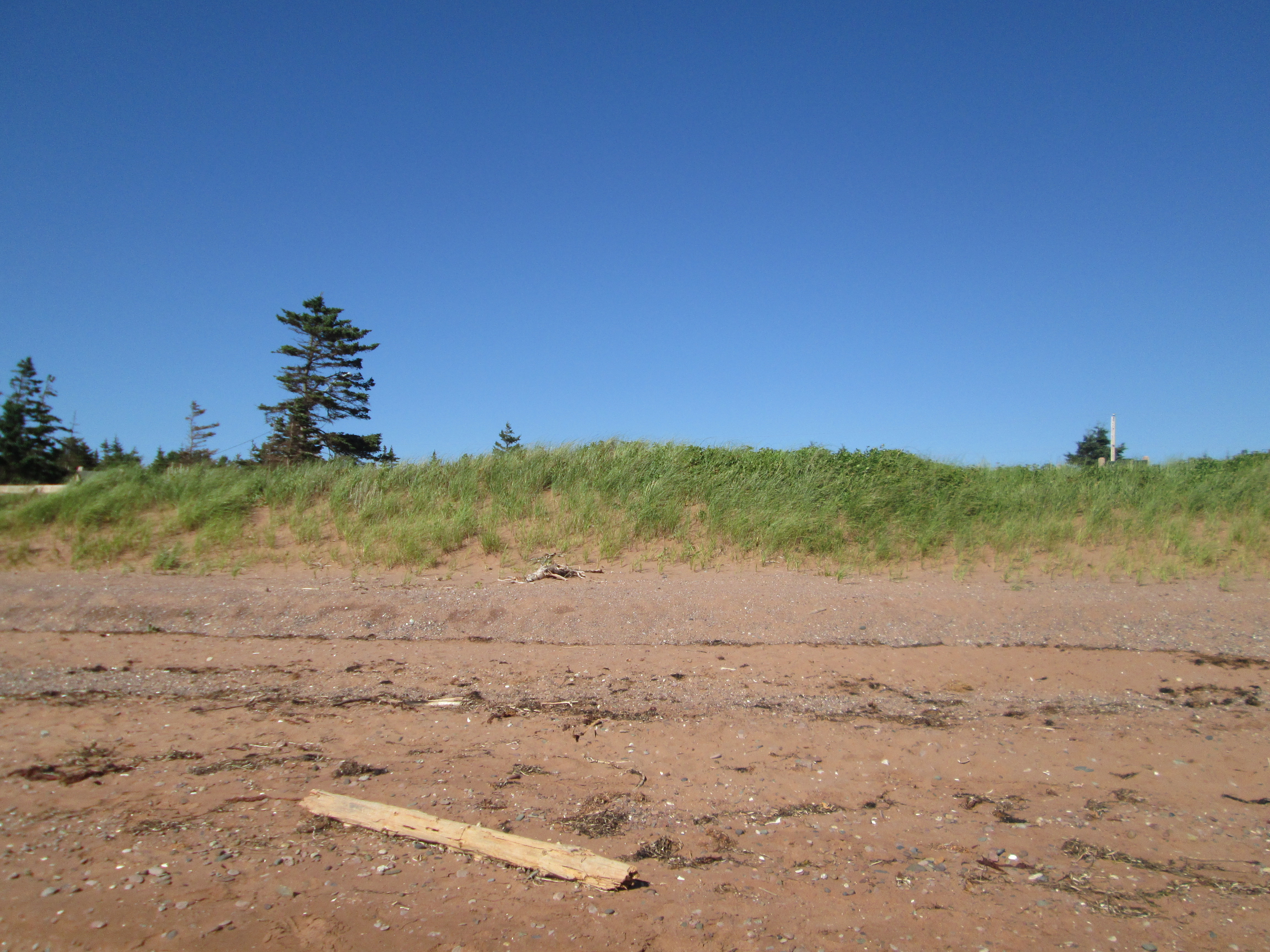
Cedar Dunes Provincial Park

Cedar Dunes Provincial Park is an ocean-front provincial park in Prince Edward Island, Canada. It is located south of West Point, facing the Northumberland Strait.
