= CFB Summerside =

Former Canadian air force base

- Near Summerside, Prince Edward Island in Canada

Site information
- Owner: Dept of National Defence (Canada)

Location
- CFB Summerside
- Coordinates: 46°26′17″N 063°49′44″W

Site history
- Built: 1940
- In use: 1941-1946; 1947-1991

Garrison information
- Garrison: No. 9 Service Flying Training School (SFTS) (194–); No. 1 General Reconnaissance School (GRS) (194–); No. 1 Reconnaissance and Navigation School in 1945; No. 1 Air Navigation School (ANS) (1947–1953); No. 2 (Maritime) Operational Training Unit; No. 107 Rescue Unit; 413 Transport and Rescue Squadron; 420 Air Reserve Squadron; 880 Maritime Reconnaissance Squadron (Royal Canadian Navy); 31 Support Air Group (Royal Canadian Navy); 415 Maritime Patrol Squadron

Canadian Forces Base Summerside (CFB Summerside) was an air force base located in St. Eleanors, Prince Edward Island, Canada, now part of the city of Summerside.

== RCAF Station Summerside ==
=== World War II ===
The airfield was constructed by the Royal Canadian Air Force (RCAF) between 1940–1941 and was named RCAF Station Summerside.

It was home to No. 9 Service Flying Training School RCAF, a flight school that operated under the British Commonwealth Air Training Plan (BCATP). Relief or emergency airfields were located at nearby RCAF Station Mount Pleasant and Wellington. Airmen were trained on Harvards. In July 1942 No. 9 SFTS moved to RCAF Station Centralia and was replaced by No. 1 General Reconnaissance School RCAF which flew Ansons. No. 1 GRS was renamed to No. 1 Reconnaissance and Navigation School in 1945.

==== Aerodrome information ====
The airfield was constructed in the typical BCATP wartime pattern, with runways formed in a triangle. In approximately 1942 the aerodrome was listed as RCAF Aerodrome - Summerside, Prince Edward Island at 46°27′N 63°50′W with a variation of 25 degrees west and elevation of 50 ft (15 m). Six runways were listed as follows:

Runway name	Length	Width	Surface
6/24	5,000 ft (1,500 m)	150 ft (46 m)	Hard surfaced
6/24	2,500 ft (760 m)	100 ft (30 m)	Hard surfaced
12/30	5,000 ft (1,500 m)	150 ft (46 m)	Hard surfaced
12/30	2,500 ft (760 m)	100 ft (30 m)	Hard surfaced
18/36	5,000 ft (1,500 m)	150 ft (46 m)	Hard surfaced
18/36	2,500 ft (760 m)	100 ft (30 m)	Hard surfaced

==== Relief landing field – Mount Pleasant ====
The primary relief landing field (R1) for RCAF Station Summerside was RCAF Station Mount Pleasant. The station was located east of the community of Ellerslie, Prince Edward Island.

==== Relief landing field – Wellington ====
The secondary relief landing field (R2) for RCAF Station Summerside was located north-east of the community of Wellington, Prince Edward Island. In approximately 1942 the aerodrome was listed as RCAF Aerodrome - Wellington, Prince Edward Island at 46°29′N 64°01′W with a variation of 24 degrees west and elevation of 150 ft (46 m). Three runways were listed as follows:

Runway name	Length	Width	Surface
1/19	3,200 ft (980 m)	500 ft (150 m)	Turf
8/26	3,200 ft (980 m)	500 ft (150 m)	Turf
14/32	3,200 ft (980 m)	500 ft (150 m)	Turf

=== Cold War ===
The station was closed in 1946 but reopened in 1947 with the formation of No. 1 Air Navigation School (ANS). This was a NATO training facility. No. 1 ANS left in 1953 and the Central Navigation School was established. In 1949 No. 2 (Maritime) Operational Training Unit started operation. The influx of personnel and their families required the building of more accommodation quarters. In 1949 the base housing was completed and named "Slemon Park" in honour of Air Marshal Roy Slemon.

During the Cold War, the base was home to anti-submarine and coastal patrol aircraft such as the Lancaster B.X, CP-122 Neptune, CP-107 Argus, and CP-121 Tracker. Other aircraft operated from Summerside include the CC-115 Buffalo and CH-113 Labrador. These aircraft were operated by various squadrons and units including No. 2 (Maritime) Operational Training Unit, No. 107 Rescue Unit, 413 Transport and Rescue Squadron, 420 Air Reserve Squadron, 880 Maritime Reconnaissance Squadron (Royal Canadian Navy), 31 Support Air Group (Royal Canadian Navy), and 415 Maritime Patrol Squadron.

On 1 February 1968, the merger of the three service branches into the unified Canadian Forces saw RCAF Station Summerside change its name to Canadian Forces Base (CFB) Summerside.

In 1977, the Government of Canada formally ratified the United Nations Convention on the Law of the Sea (UNCLOS III), which mandated the creation of an Exclusive Economic Zone extending 200 nmi (370 km) off all coasts. This created a requirement for military enforcement of sovereignty to protect natural resources within the EEZ, such as oil and gas reserves, and fisheries.

CFB Summerside's primary mission evolved during the late 1970s and throughout the 1980s into providing support for Fisheries and Oceans Canada, the government department responsible for managing Canada's ocean resources. CP-121 Trackers were used to patrol Georges Bank and the Grand Banks of Newfoundland to monitor foreign fishing fleets. Search and rescue (SAR) was a secondary role which was no less important to the civilian population of the Maritime Provinces which, relied on SAR aircraft for urgent medevac to large tertiary-care hospitals in Halifax, Nova Scotia and Moncton, New Brunswick, as well as for mariners and air crew who frequently found themselves in distress, requiring rescue.

The 1989 federal budget cuts to the Department of National Defence identified CFB Summerside as a candidate for base closure. At the time, the base employed some 1,200, and contributed about C$50 million to the province's economy each year. Local concern groups were formed to protest the closure. On 14 May 1989, about 10,000 people (more than the population of Summerside at the time) marched in protest. City streets were festooned in yellow ribbons, a symbol of opposition to the closure. About 400 Prince Edward Islanders travelled to Ottawa in June 1989 to protest at Parliament Hill. In response to this opposition, then-minister of national defence, Bill McKnight, told the House of Commons, "there is no military operational reason to maintain that base". In 1991 the base was closed and the majority of military units were transferred to CFB Greenwood in Nova Scotia.

=== Past scheduled passenger airline service ===
The airfield was served by Eastern Provincial Airways during the 1960s and early 1970s which operated nonstop flights to Moncton and the Magdalen Islands as well as direct service via a stop in Charlottetown to Halifax; Sydney, NS; Deer Lake, NL; Gander, NL; and St. John's, NL with Douglas DC-3 prop aircraft and Handley Page Dart Herald turboprop aircraft.

== Current use ==
The entire property including airfield, housing units, hangars and support structures was renamed Slemon Park and was transferred to a local development authority named "Slemon Park Corporation". Today the site is host to a mix of public and private sector operations, including Vector Aerospace and several other aerospace companies. Employment at Slemon Park facilities now exceeds pre-1991 levels.

The airfield remains active as the Summerside Airport. Though the airfield has the longest runways in the province, it only supports general aviation with the closest scheduled passenger airline flights being offered via the Charlottetown Airport.

During its existence as an air force base, CFB Summerside was jurisdictionally situated in the township of Lot 17. In the 1995 municipal amalgamation that created the city of Summerside, the city's municipal boundary was extended to divide the former base. Under these plans, Summerside Airport and the industrial facilities of Slemon Park remained in Lot 17 while the residential area of Slemon Park was placed within the city of Summerside.

== Incidents and accidents ==
- On 31 March 1977, a Canadair CP-107 Argus maritime patrol aircraft crashed while attempting to land at the base. Of the 16 crew members on board, three were killed.
- On 24 May 1986, a CF-18 fighter jet attached to 425 Tactical Fighter Squadron at CFB Bagotville crashed into Malpeque Bay shortly after taking off from CFB Summerside, killing the pilot, Captain Tristan De Koninck. It was the third crash of a CF-18.
