= Jack Turner (photographer) =

Canadian war photographer

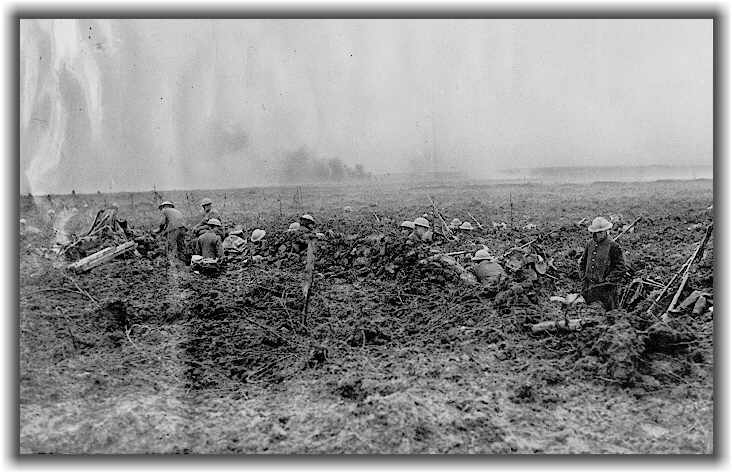
Turner's photograph from the Battle of Vimy Ridge

Brenton Harold Turner (September 24, 1889 – October 6, 1989), also known as Jack Turner, was a Canadian war photographer.

== Life ==
Turner was a soldier with the 2nd Canadian Siege Battery during the First World War. While in Europe he smuggled a German-built 2 in × 3 in (51 mm × 76 mm) format camera with him and took approximately 99 photographs from the war zone.

After the war, Turner returned to Prince Edward Island, married and took up farming in Knutsford. He died October 6, 1989 at 100 years of age.
