= Hebron, Prince Edward Island =

Hebron
- Village
- Location of Hebron in Prince Edward Island
- Coordinates: 46°37′51″N 64°15′46″W
- Country: Canada
- Province: Prince Edward Island
- County: Prince County
- Township: Lot 8

Area
  - Total: 4.50 km^{2} (1.74 sq mi)
- Time zone: UTC-4 (AST)
  - Summer (DST): UTC-3 (ADT)
- Area code: 902
- NTS Map: 021I09
- GNBC Code: BABIG

Hebron is a Canadian rural community in Prince County, Prince Edward Island. It is located in the township of Lot 8, Prince Edward Island, south of O'Leary.

The community is named for the biblical city of Hebron.
