= Central Prince =

- Rural municipality
- Central Prince in Prince Edward Island
- Coordinates: 46.595°N 63.990°W
- Country: Canada
- Province: Prince Edward Island
- County: Prince County

Government
  - Mayor: Rod Millar
  - Councillors: Julie Smith, Deanna Wagner, Ron MacLeod, Wanda LeClair, Jason Campbell, Thomas Burleigh
  - CAO: Jolene Millar
- Time zone: AST
  - Summer (DST): ADT
- Area code: 902

Central Prince is a rural municipality within Prince County in Prince Edward Island that was incorporated on September 28, 2018 through an amalgamation of two municipalities. The municipalities that amalgamated were the rural municipalities of Ellerslie-Bideford and Lady Slipper.

== Demographics ==
Federal census population history of Central Prince
| Year | Pop. | ±% |
|---|---|---|
| 2016 | 1,054 | — |
| 2021 | 1,129 | +7.1% |
Source: Statistics Canada

In the 2021 Census of Population conducted by Statistics Canada, Central Prince had a population of 1,129 living in 459 of its 529 total private dwellings, a change of 7.1% from its 2016 population of 1,054. With a land area of 133.78 km^{2} (51.65 sq mi), it had a population density of 8.4/km^{2} (21.9/sq mi) in 2021.

| Name | Former municipal status | Original incorporation year | 2016 Census of Population | | | | |
| Name | Former municipal status | Original incorporation year | Population (2016) | Population (2011) | Change | Land area (km²) | Population density |
|---|---|---|---|---|---|---|---|
| Ellerslie-Bideford | Rural municipality | 1977 | 348 | 357 | −2.5% | 20.8 | 16.7/km^{2} |
| Lady Slipper | Rural municipality | 1983 | 764 | 805 | −5.1% | 112.4 | 6.8/km^{2} |
| Total former municipalities | – | – | 1,112 | 1,162 | −4.3% | 133.2 | 8.3/km^{2} |

== Government ==
The Rural Municipality of Central Prince is governed by an interim council comprising an interim mayor (Rod Millar) and six interim councillors. The first election for a mayor and six councillors is scheduled for November 5, 2018.
