= St. Eleanors, Prince Edward Island =

Human settlement in Canada

Coordinates: 46°25′00″N 63°48′00″W

Federal census population history of St. Eleanors
Year	Pop.	±%
1961	1,002	—
1966	1,419	+41.6%
1971	1,621	+14.2%
1976	2,495	+53.9%
1981	2,716	+8.9%
1986	3,743	+37.8%
1991	3,514	−6.1%
Source: Statistics Canada

St. Eleanors is a neighbourhood in the city of Summerside, Prince Edward Island, Canada.

Located in the northwest part of the township of Lot 17 fronting Malpeque Bay, St. Eleanors was named after Eleanor Sanksey, a housekeeper for a Colonel Harry Compton.

It was largely a rural farming community on the northwest edge of the small port town of Summerside until World War II. In 1940, several farm properties in the northern part of St. Eleanors were purchased by the federal government for the construction of RCAF Station Summerside, a Royal Canadian Air Force training and operations base. The arrival of the RCAF in the hamlet spurred construction of new roads, particularly the all-weather highway known as the "Western Road" (Route 2). The military spending stimulated dramatic population growth throughout the remaining years of the war and through the Cold War as the base was repurposed, being renamed CFB Summerside in 1968.

The community's status evolved as it became enveloped in suburban residential growth during the post-war period. In 1983, St. Eleanors achieved village status. In 1989, CFB Summerside was identified for closure by 1991, causing the village's economy to undergo a significant readjustment. In 1995, St. Eleanors was amalgamated into the City of Summerside.
