= Ellerslie-Bideford, Prince Edward Island =

Ellerslie-Bideford
- Community
- Municipality of Ellerslie-Bideford
- Ellerslie-Bideford in Prince Edward Island
- Coordinates: 46.601°N 63.958°W
- Country: Canada
- Province: Prince Edward Island
- County: Prince County
- Parish: Halifax
- Lot: Lot 12
- Founded: 1901
- Established: 1977

Government
  - Chairperson: Myron Hutchinson
  - Councillor: Lorraine Barlow; Leslie Enman; Warren Gillis; Jason Grigg; Adam Hutchinson; Rod Millar
  - CAO: Julie Ellisworth-Enman

Population (2001)
  - Total: 470
- Time zone: AST
  - Summer (DST): ADT
- Canadian postal code: C0B 1J0
- Area code: 902
- NTS Map: 011L12
- GNBC Code: BADWV

Ellerslie-Bideford was a municipality that held community status in Prince Edward Island, Canada. It was located in Prince County on Lot 12.

Most residents of Ellerslie-Bideford lived on Ellerslie Road (Route 133) which spans 5 miles from Route 2 to Route 12.

== History ==
The community was incorporated by provincial government in 1977, when Ellerslie merged with Bideford. Ellerslie was founded in 1853 by a local carpenter, being named after Ellerslie, Scotland. Bideford was named in 1818 after Bideford, Devon, England. Ellerslie is currently one of the last communities in the West Prince district of Prince Edward Island prior to the border with East Prince.

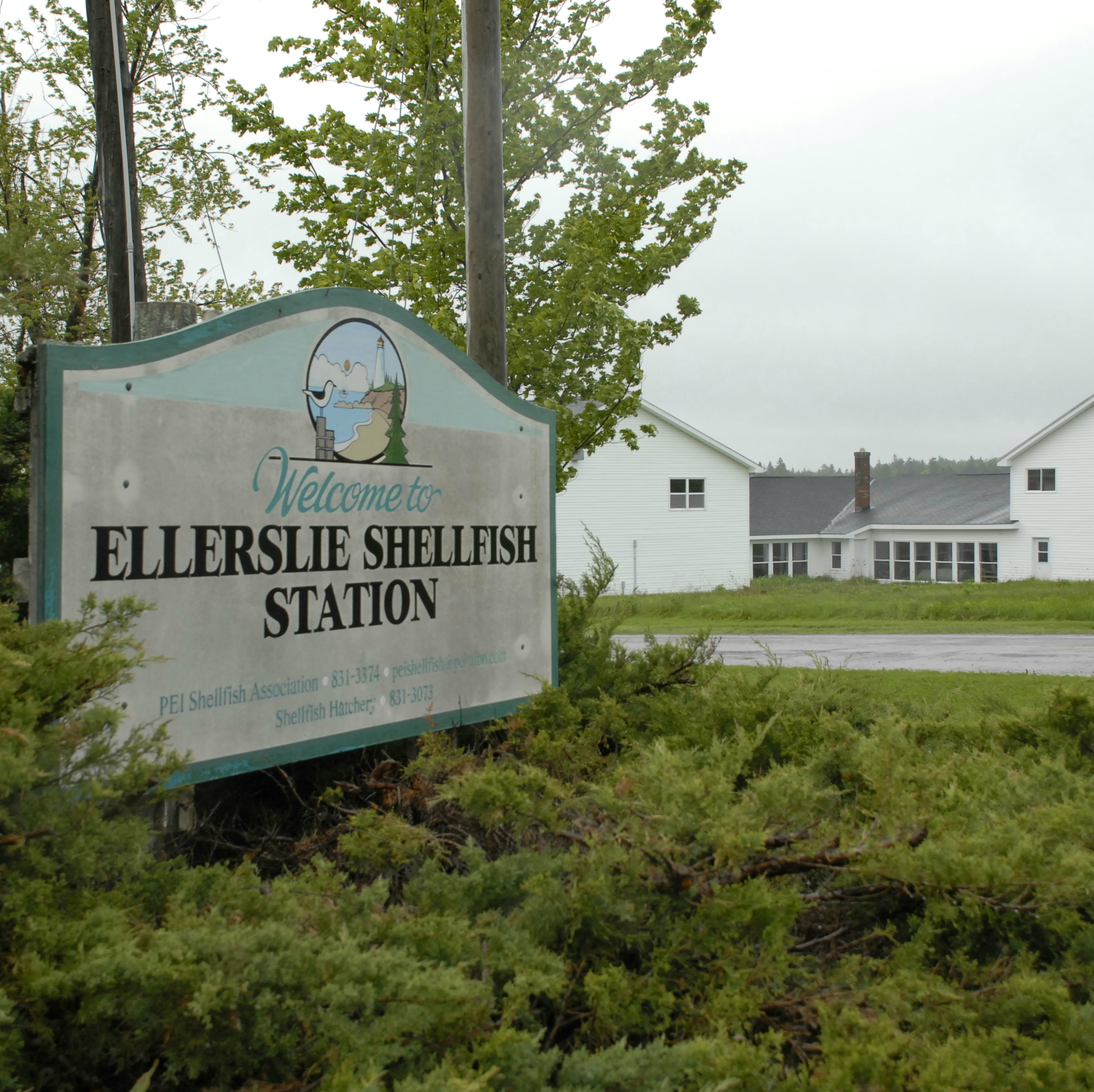
Ellerslie Shellfish Station and Shellfish Museum. Situated on an arm of Malpeque Bay, it is a centre of the famed Malpeque Oyster industry.

The community had a rich history in the fox farming and ship building industries. The Bideford Shipyard launched several sea vessels, including the last one to be christened there, the Meteor. Bideford is also home to a Shellfish Museum; as the fishery is the basis of the local economy.

Over the past several years, the Community Improvement Council (or CIC) has endeavored to undertake several infrastructure projects. These projects include a new set of Soccer Fields and a Running Track. The Council also attempted to move the community towards a central sewer system from the current model of independent septic tanks for each dwelling, however this motion was defeated in a community vote, over much controversy.

On September 28, 2018, the municipality was combined with Lady Slipper, to create the new municipality of Central Prince.

== Education ==
Ellerslie was home to Ellerslie Elementary School, which has approximately 200 students in grades K-6. From this school, area residents go to Hernewood Intermediate, and Westisle Composite High.

== Attractions ==
- Bideford Parsonage Museum
- The Bideford Shellfish Museum

== See also ==
- List of communities in Prince Edward Island
- Summerside
- Charlottetown
- Tignish
