= Lot 17, Prince Edward Island =

Lot 17
- Township
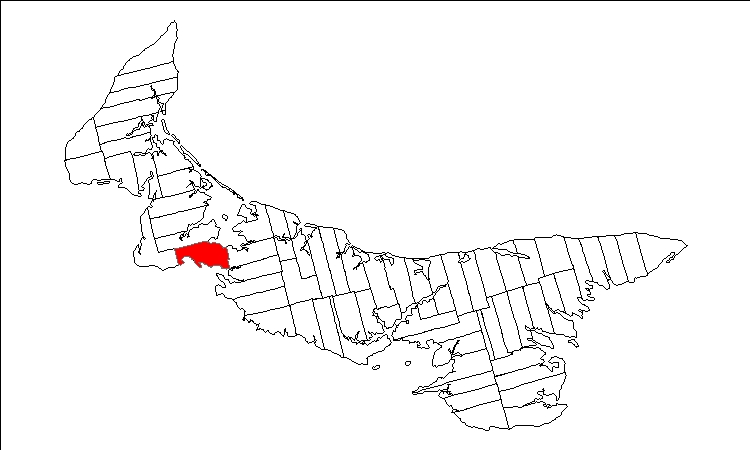
- Map of Prince Edward Island highlighting Lot 17
- Coordinates: 46°37′N 63°54′W
- Country: Canada
- Province: Prince Edward Island
- County: Prince County
- Parish: Richmond Parish

Area
  - Total: 51.63 km^{2} (19.93 sq mi)

Population (2006)
  - Total: 563
  - Density: 10.9/km^{2} (28/sq mi)
- Time zone: UTC-4 (AST)
  - Summer (DST): UTC-3 (ADT)
- Canadian Postal code: C0B
- Area code: 902
- NTS Map: 011L05
- GNBC Code: BAERD

Lot 17 is a township in Prince County, Prince Edward Island, Canada. It is part of Richmond Parish. Lot 17 was awarded to Bingham and Theobold Burke in the 1767 land lottery. Half of it had been sold for arrears of quitrent by 1781, and one quarter was granted to Loyalists. Six-thousand acres were sold to Acadians in 1800.

== Communities ==
Incorporated municipalities:

- Linkletter
- Miscouche
- Sherbrooke
- St-Nicholas
- Summerside

Civic address communities:

- Belmont Lot 16
- Central Lot 16
- Miscouche
- North St. Eleanors
- Slemon Park
- St-Nicholas
- Summerside

== Demographics ==
Historical population
Year	Pop.	±%
1871	1,644	—
1881	1,647	+0.2%
1891	1,694	+2.9%
1901	1,589	−6.2%
1911	1,499	−5.7%
1921	1,331	−11.2%
1931	1,426	+7.1%
1941	1,597	+12.0%
2006	563	−64.7%
