= Unionvale, Prince Edward Island =

Coordinates: 46.715°N 64.190°W

Location of Unionvale in Prince Edward Island

Unionvale is a settlement in Prince Edward Island.
