= West Point, Prince Edward Island =

Community in Prince Edward Island

Coordinates: 46°37′N 64°23′W

Location of West Point in Prince Edward Island

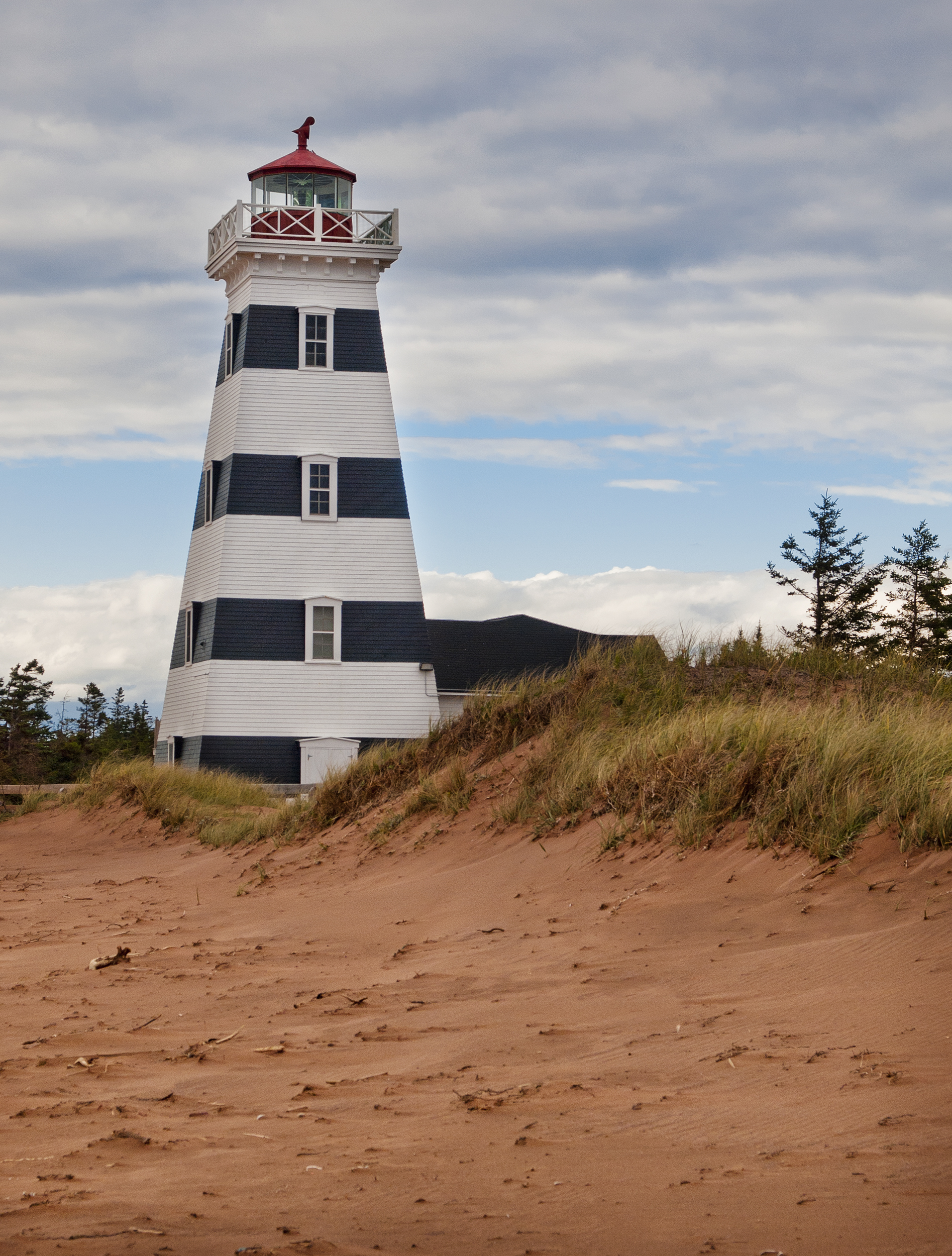
West Point Lighthouse

West Point is a cape and an unincorporated community located in the southwestern corner of Prince Edward Island, Canada.

West Point Lighthouse, a square tapered tower, was built in 1875 by the federal Department of Marine. The West Point Lighthouse Inn, Museum and Restaurant was established in 1984. The West Point Development Corporation, a non-profit organization, maintains the lighthouse as a navigational aid beacon, although the living quarters of the lighthouse are now used as a unique country inn and museum.

This lighthouse was first lit on May 21, 1876.

Cedar Dunes Provincial Park is located at West Point and provides a supervised public beach for swimming.

West Point is not the westernmost extreme point of Prince Edward Island; that is West Cape, several kilometres to the north and slightly west.

Part of the very large West Cape Wind Farm is located in West Point.

== Notable people ==
George Sutherland Currie (March 20, 1871 – April 17, 1900), also known as George "Flat-Nose" Curry, was a Canadian-American robber of the American Old West. Curry was a mentor to Harvey Logan, who would adopt the surname Curry, and the two robbed banks together before both became members of Butch Cassidy's Wild Bunch. Curry was killed by a sheriff while rustling in Grand County, Utah.
