= Knutsford, Prince Edward Island =

Unincorporated rural community in Prince County, Prince Edward Island

Coordinates: 46°42′N 64°17′W

Location of Knutsford in PEI

Knutsford is an unincorporated rural community in Prince County, Prince Edward Island.

It was named Knutsford by Robert Longridge, after his birthplace. He also chose the same name for a site near Kamloops, Canada where he farmed. He was a son of Robert Charles Longridge, Managing Director of 'British Engine' based in Manchester and first Chairman of Knutsford Urban District Council, Cheshire, England. Ref. Longridge Family History.

It is located southwest of O'Leary. Its area measures 77.09 km^{2}.

== Population ==
- Population in 2001: 585
- Population in 1996: 628

== Famous residents ==
- Renowned photographer Jack Turner farmed in this community.
