= West Cape, Prince Edward Island =

Coordinates: 46°41′N 64°24′W

Location of West Cape in Prince Edward Island

West Cape is a cape and an unincorporated community located at the westernmost extremity of Prince Edward Island, Canada.

West Cape is the westernmost point of Prince Edward Island, as opposed to West Point, which lies several kilometres to the south and slightly east.

== West Cape Wind Farm ==
The largest wind farm in Atlantic Canada is centered in West Cape, extending north to Point Wolfe and south to West Point, for a distance of approximately 10 kilometers. Encompassing an area of about 25 square kilometers, the wind farm consists of 55 turbines producing 99 megawatts of power, surpassing the Kent Hills Wind Farm in New Brunswick by 3 megawatts. While about 10% of the power is sold to the city of Summerside, the rest is exported through New Brunswick to New England markets. The wind farm was established in 2009 by GDF Suez of France (now Engie) on land leased from local owners. The project was valued at CDN$200 million when completed, and was the largest single project on the Island since construction of the Confederation Bridge (1990s).
