= Halifax Parish, Prince Edward Island =

Coordinates: 46°37′30.3″N 64°9′32.3″W

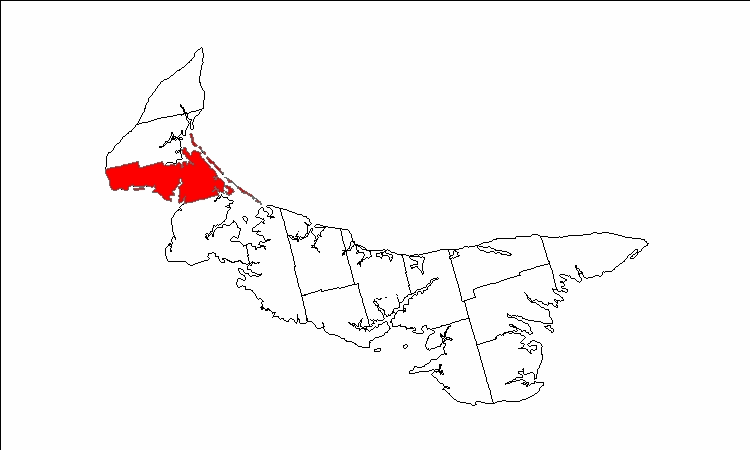

Halifax Parish was created as a civil parish in Prince County, Prince Edward Island, Canada, during the 1764–1766 survey of Samuel Holland.

It contains the following townships:

- Lot 8
- Lot 9
- Lot 10
- Lot 11
- Lot 12
