= Roxbury, Prince Edward Island =

Coordinates: 46.722°N 64.103°W

Location of Roxbury in Prince Edward Island

Roxbury, a community of Lot 6 is a settlement in Prince Edward Island.

== Roxbury, Prince Edward Island ==
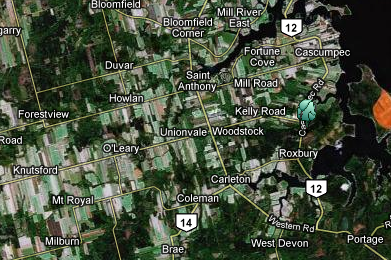
Roxbury, Prince Edward Island

Roxbury, an unincorporated area, is located in Prince County in the western portion of Prince Edward Island, E. of O'Leary. Its precise location is 46'43"N, 64'06"W.

== History of the Name ==
The official history of the geographic name Roxbury (which can be somewhat technical, we admit): Roxbury (Loc.) was adopted 30 November 1966 on 21I/9.Status confirmed 23 October 1989 on 203–8.

== Census Information ==
Roxbury falls inside the Statistics Canada census subdivision of Lot 6. We have detailed statistical information available for the Lot 6 census subdivision for the following categories: Education, Ethnicity, Family, Income, Labour Force, Population, and Shelter.
