= Portage, Prince Edward Island =

Coordinates: 46.664°N 64.059°W

Location of Portage in Prince Edward Island

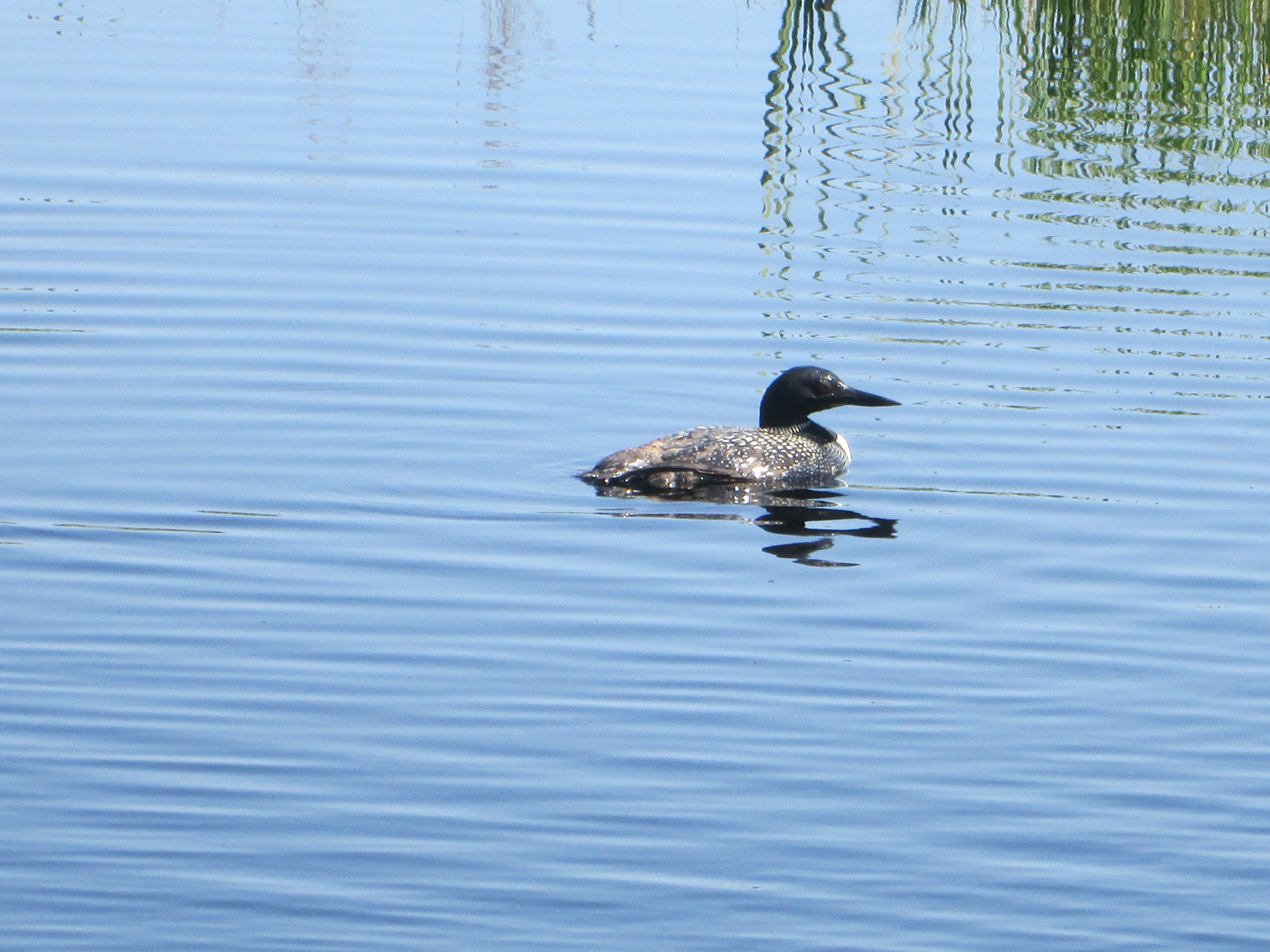

Portage is a settlement in Prince Edward Island.
