= O'Leary, Prince Edward Island =

O'Leary
- Town
- Town of O'Leary
- Seal
- Nickname: Kraft Hockeyville 2017 Champions
- Location of O'Leary in Prince Edward Island
- Coordinates: 46°42′25″N 64°13′50″W
- Country: Canada
- Province: Prince Edward Island
- County: Prince County
- First settled: 1837
- Incorporated as a village: 1951
- Incorporated as a community: 1983
- Named for: Michael O'Leary

Government
  - Type: Town Council
  - Mayor: Eric Gavin
  - Deputy Mayor: Darren MacKinnon
  - Town Council: Joey Dumville; Valene Gallant; Judy MacIsaac; Kevin Maynard; Darrel Wood
  - Administrator: Beverley Shaw
  - Recreation: Andrew Avery

Area
  - Total: 4.4 km^{2} (1.68 sq mi)
- Elevation: 31 m (102 ft)

Population (2016)
  - Total: 815
  - Density: 187/km^{2} (485/sq mi)
- Time zone: UTC-04:00 (AST)
- Canadian Postal code: C0B 1V0
- Area code: 902
- Telephone Exchange: 726 807 859
- NTS Map: 021I09
- GNBC Code: BABYS
- Website: www.townofoleary.com

O'Leary is a village located in Prince County, Prince Edward Island, about 60 kilometers west of Summerside. Its population in the 2021 Canadian Census was 876 people. O'Leary was incorporated as a village in 1951, and as a community in 1983.

== History ==
=== Michael O'Leary ===
The village is named after Michael O'Leary, an Irish settler who arrived in Prince Edward Island in 1837. Michael O'Leary settled with his wife in what is now the town of O'Leary. In 1837, western Prince Edward Island was sparsely settled, with no roads and only a small amount of cleared land, so O'Leary himself cleared a road through the wilderness to his property from Cascumpeque; this became O'Leary Road, today part of Route 142, which is the town's main street.

In 1858, after the death of his wife, Michael O'Leary returned to Ireland at an old age. He found only a few relatives and no friends, so he returned to Canada. He never made it back to Prince Edward Island, though; reportedly, he was pushed off a wharf in Halifax, Nova Scotia, and drowned.

=== O'Leary Railway Station ===
A railroad was built in O'Leary by the year 1874. The station was called the O'Leary Road Station, and the name "O'Leary" eventually came to refer to the settlement. The development of cars and transport trucks later rendered the train almost obsolete; the last train passed the O'Leary Station in 1989, and in 1992 the tracks were removed. The original railroad became the Confederation Trail. The O'Leary Railway Station still stands today at 513 Main Street, although it is no longer a train station.

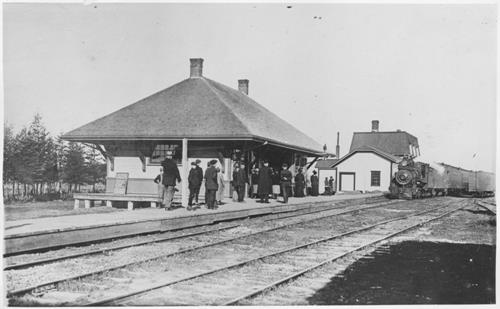
O'Leary Railway Station, 1914

== Demographics ==
Federal census population history of O'Leary
Year	Pop.	±%
1956	639	—
1961	755	+18.2%
1966	738	−2.3%
1971	795	+7.7%
1976	805	+1.3%
1981	735	−8.7%
1986	823	+12.0%
1991	856	+4.0%
1996	877	+2.5%
2001	860	−1.9%
2006	861	+0.1%
2011	812	−5.7%
2016	815	+0.4%
2021	876	+7.5%
Source: Statistics Canada

In the 2021 Census of Population conducted by Statistics Canada, O'Leary had a population of 876 people living in 373 of its 402 total private dwellings, a change of 7.5% from its 2016 population of 815. With a land area of 1.83 km^{2} (0.71 sq mi), it had a population density of 478.7/km^{2} (1,239.8/sq mi) in 2021.

== Economy ==
The community's economy is tied to the potato farming industry. O'Leary is home to the Canadian Potato Museum.

== Stores and services ==
The O'Leary Town Complex, at 18 Community Street includes a volunteer fire department and a library. The fire department was started in about 1939 by a group of citizens and currently has approximately 30 members.

The O'Leary Farmer's Co-op is the town's main grocery store, located at 500 Main Street and typically open all week. Other shops in this community include a PharmaChoice, a Home Hardware, O'Leary Auto Parts, a Castle Building Centre, and a Medicine Shoppe.

== Climate ==
Climate data for O'Leary
Month	Jan	Feb	Mar	Apr	May	Jun	Jul	Aug	Sep	Oct	Nov	Dec	Year
Record high °C (°F)	13.5 (56.3)	13 (55)	16.5 (61.7)	21.5 (70.7)	32.2 (90.0)	33.5 (92.3)	32.8 (91.0)	32.5 (90.5)	32.5 (90.5)	24 (75)	20 (68)	13.9 (57.0)	33.5 (92.3)
Mean daily maximum °C (°F)	−4.4 (24.1)	−3.8 (25.2)	0.7 (33.3)	6.5 (43.7)	14.3 (57.7)	19.8 (67.6)	23.2 (73.8)	22.8 (73.0)	18 (64)	11.4 (52.5)	5.1 (41.2)	−1.2 (29.8)	9.4 (48.9)
Mean daily minimum °C (°F)	−12.7 (9.1)	−12.2 (10.0)	−7 (19)	−1.2 (29.8)	4.3 (39.7)	9.8 (49.6)	13.8 (56.8)	13.6 (56.5)	9.5 (49.1)	4.1 (39.4)	−0.9 (30.4)	−7.9 (17.8)	1.1 (34.0)
Record low °C (°F)	−31 (−24)	−29.4 (−20.9)	−25.6 (−14.1)	−13.9 (7.0)	−6.1 (21.0)	−1.1 (30.0)	3.9 (39.0)	3.3 (37.9)	−1.1 (30.0)	−6.7 (19.9)	−15 (5)	−27.2 (−17.0)	−31 (−24)
Average precipitation mm (inches)	97.1 (3.82)	78.3 (3.08)	89.4 (3.52)	85.2 (3.35)	95.6 (3.76)	82.6 (3.25)	100.1 (3.94)	84.9 (3.34)	99.7 (3.93)	107.9 (4.25)	110.2 (4.34)	109.7 (4.32)	1,140.7 (44.91)
Source: Environment Canada
