= Woodstock, Prince Edward Island =

Human settlement in Prince Edward Island, Canada

Coordinates: 46.757°N 64.129°W

Location of Woodstock in Prince Edward Island

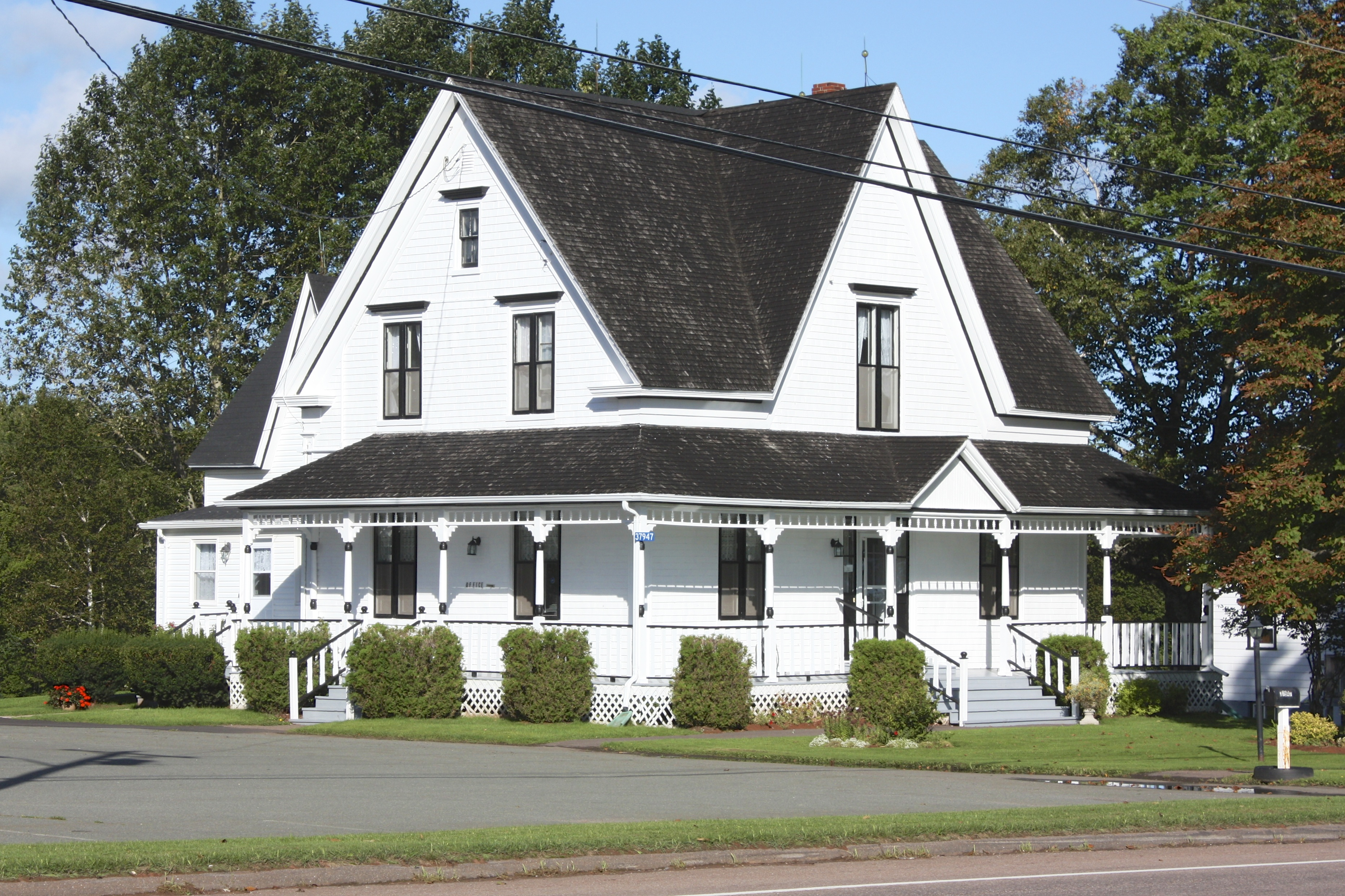
37947 Western Road - Route 2, Woodstock, Prince Edward Island, Canada

Woodstock is a settlement in Prince Edward Island.
