= Lady Slipper, Prince Edward Island =

Former rural municipality of Prince Edward Island

Coordinates: 46.603°N 64.014°W

Location of Lady Slipper in Prince Edward Island

Lady Slipper was a municipality that held community status in Prince Edward Island, Canada. On September 28, 2018, it was combined with the municipality of Ellerslie-Bideford, to create the new municipality of Central Prince.
