= Mount Pleasant, Prince Edward Island =

Coordinates: 46°34′50″N 64°0′32″W

Mount Pleasant is a Canadian rural community located in Prince County, Prince Edward Island.

The name "Mount Pleasant" was selected at a public meeting on November 1, 1862, and was formally recognized in Place Names of Prince Edward Island in 1925.

Mount Pleasant has been located in the Municipality of Lady Slipper since 1983.

== Military base ==
The Royal Canadian Air Force established an air base in the community during the early years of World War II for training air crew under the British Commonwealth Air Training Plan (BCATP).

Construction of the base required diversion of the Western Road for several kilometres along the western edge of the airfield property. The base was closed following the war and the Western Road returned to its original alignment.
