= Summerside, Prince Edward Island =

Summerside
- City
- City of Summerside
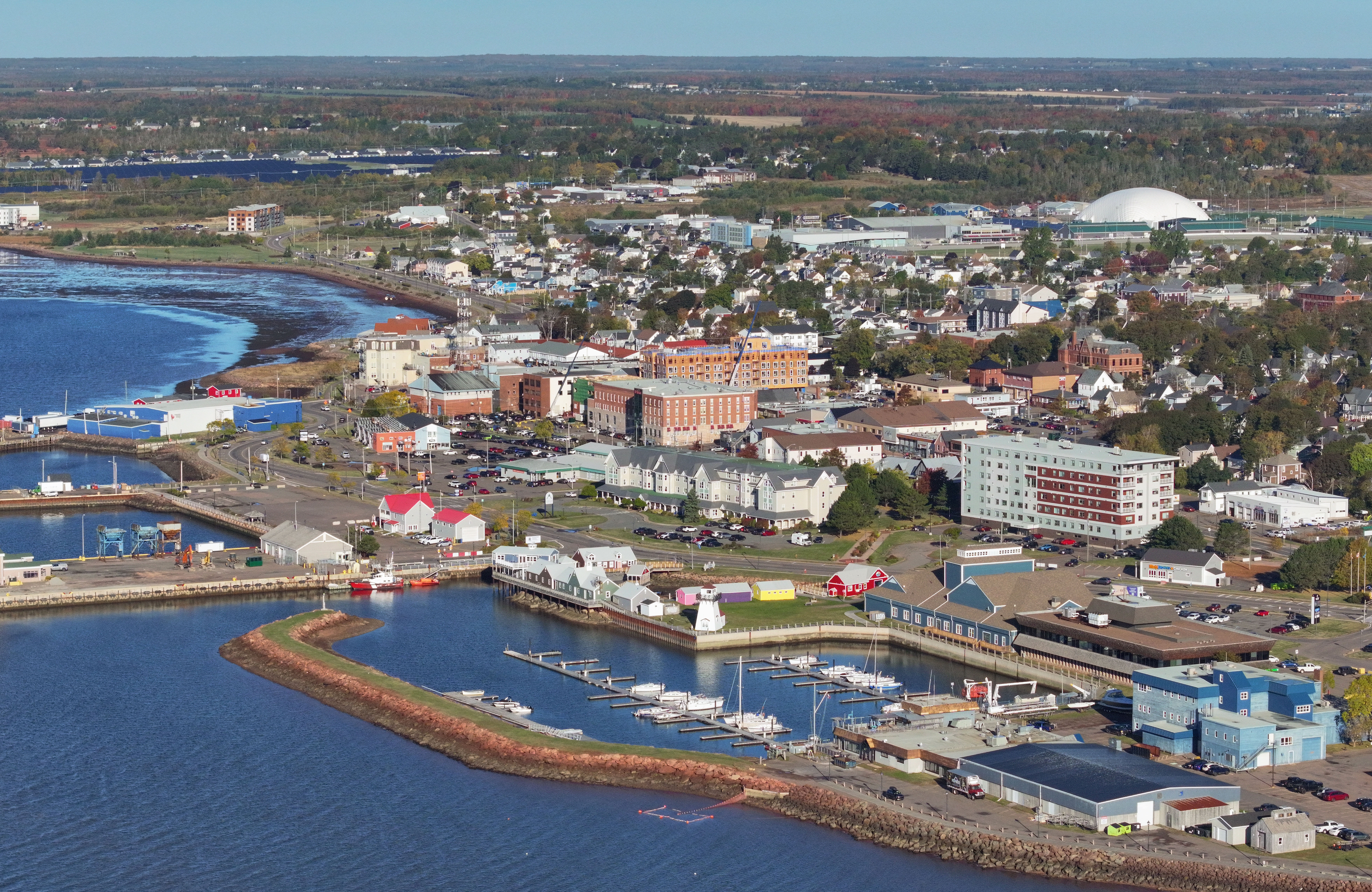
- City Centre

- Motto: Small city. Big opportunity.
- Location within Prince Edward Island
- Coordinates: 46°23′36″N 63°47′25″W
- Country: Canada
- Province: Prince Edward Island
- County: Prince County
- Founded: 1800s
- Incorporated: April 1, 1877 (town)
- April 1, 1995 (city)

Government
  - Mayor: Cory Snow (acting)
  - Governing body: Summerside City Council

Area
  - City: 28.21 km^{2} (10.89 sq mi)
  - Metro: 125.12 km^{2} (48.31 sq mi)
- Elevation: 0 to 29 m (0 to 95 ft)

Population (2021)
  - City: 16,001
  - Density: 567.2/km^{2} (1,469/sq mi)
  - Metro: 18,157
  - Metro density: 145.12/km^{2} (375.85/sq mi)
- Time zone: UTC-4 (Atlantic (AST))
  - Summer (DST): UTC-3 (ADT)
- Canadian Postal code: C1N
- Telephone Exchange: 902: 303 315 358 374 381 432 436 438 439; 598 724 888 918 954 992
- Total private dwellings: 5,981
- Mean household income: $38,688
- NTS Map: 11L5 Summerside
- GNBC Code: BADSZ
- Website: www.city.summerside.pe.ca

Summerside is a Canadian city in Prince County, Prince Edward Island, Canada, consisting of the amalgamated communities of Summerside, St Eleanors, and Wilmot. It is the second largest city in the province and the primary service centre for the western part of the island.

== History ==
Prior to European colonisation the area of present-day Summerside was part of Mi'kma'ki, the traditional lands of the Mi'kmaq people. The Mi'kmaq called the area Eptek, meaning "Hot Place" and occupied the area seasonally as a summer hunting and fishing ground.

The first European settlers in the area were French Acadians who settled along the shores of Malpeque Bay and Bedeque Bay between 1728 and 1758. In 1758 the majority of the French colonists were deported by the British during the Expulsion of the Acadians. In 1765 Samuel Holland surveyed Prince Edward Island and divided it up into sixty seven lots, with the area around Bedeque Bay falling into Lot 17. The first British Colonists in the area were Loyalist veterans and refugees who were granted land along Bedeque Bay in 1783 following the American Revolution. The first colonists in present-day Summerside were a United Empire Loyalist named Daniel Green and his wife Martha Oat. Who were granted land on the North shore of Bedeque Bay. The small community in this area became known as Green's Shore, named after Daniel Green. Throughout the rest of the 18th and early 19th centuries Green's Shore remained a small agricultural village. The area's main economic centre was the community of Bedeque. In 1840 Joseph Green, the youngest son of Daniel Green established an inn near Green's Shore called Summer Side House. Its name referencing the warmer weather of the island's South shore compared to its North. It is from this inn that the community of Summerside eventually took its name.

In the early 1850s Joseph Pope moved his wooden shipbuilding operation from Bedeque to Summerside due to the deeper waters on the North shore of the bay. This kickstarted a shipbuilding boom in the area. From the 1850s to the 1890s Summerside grew into a thriving port. With several shipyards opening up along its waterfront, and a railroad connection to the port was established in 1871. The harbour became the main port for exports from Western PEI. Summerside was officially incorporated as a town on April 1, 1877. In the 1890s the wooden shipbuilding industry collapsed due to competition with steam ships, and the town's economy began to focus on agriculture.

In 1895 Charles Dalton and Robert Oulton developed a method for breeding foxes in captivity in Prince County, creating the fox farming industry. From 1895 to1914 over two hundred fox farms were established on Prince Edward Island, many focused around Summerside. With the market booming between 1910 and 14 before steadily declining over the following decades. Fox farming continues on Prince Edward Island to this day. The island's foxes served as the foundation stock for the global fox fur industry. All domesticated foxes today descend from foxes bred in Prince Edward Island, and most foxes on the island descend from the domesticated farm population.

In 1934 the town of Summerside built its own municipal airport to try and bolster its local economy. This airport operated until RCAF Station Summerside was opened in 1941. RCAF Station Summerside operated throughout the Second World War training pilots from across the British Commonwealth. The base was briefly closed in 1946 but resumed peace time operations in 1947. The base became an integral part of Summerside's economy. With a large population of military personnel living in the city. A housing development called Slemon Park was built in 1949 to house them. The base was renamed CFB Summerside in 1968, after the unification of the Canadian Armed Forces. Civilian passenger service provided by Eastern Provincial Airways operated from the base between the early 1950s and 1972.

Rail service on Prince Edward Island ended in 1989, and CFB Summerside was closed in 1992. The town of Summerside acquired most of the base infrastructure following its closure and developed the area into Slemon Park Business Centre, operated by the Slemon Park Corporation. Summerside Airport still sees use from charter flights, and the Royal Canadian Air Force. Slemon Park is host to several aerospace companies including StandardAero and Honeywell.

On April 1, 1995, the Town of Summerside amalgamated with the incorporated communities of St. Eleanors and Wilmot to become the City of Summerside. At the same time, the amalgamated Summerside annexed portions of the Community of Sherbrooke and the Lot 17 township. Becoming Prince Edward Island's second incorporated city, after the provincial capital of Charlottetown.

== Economy ==
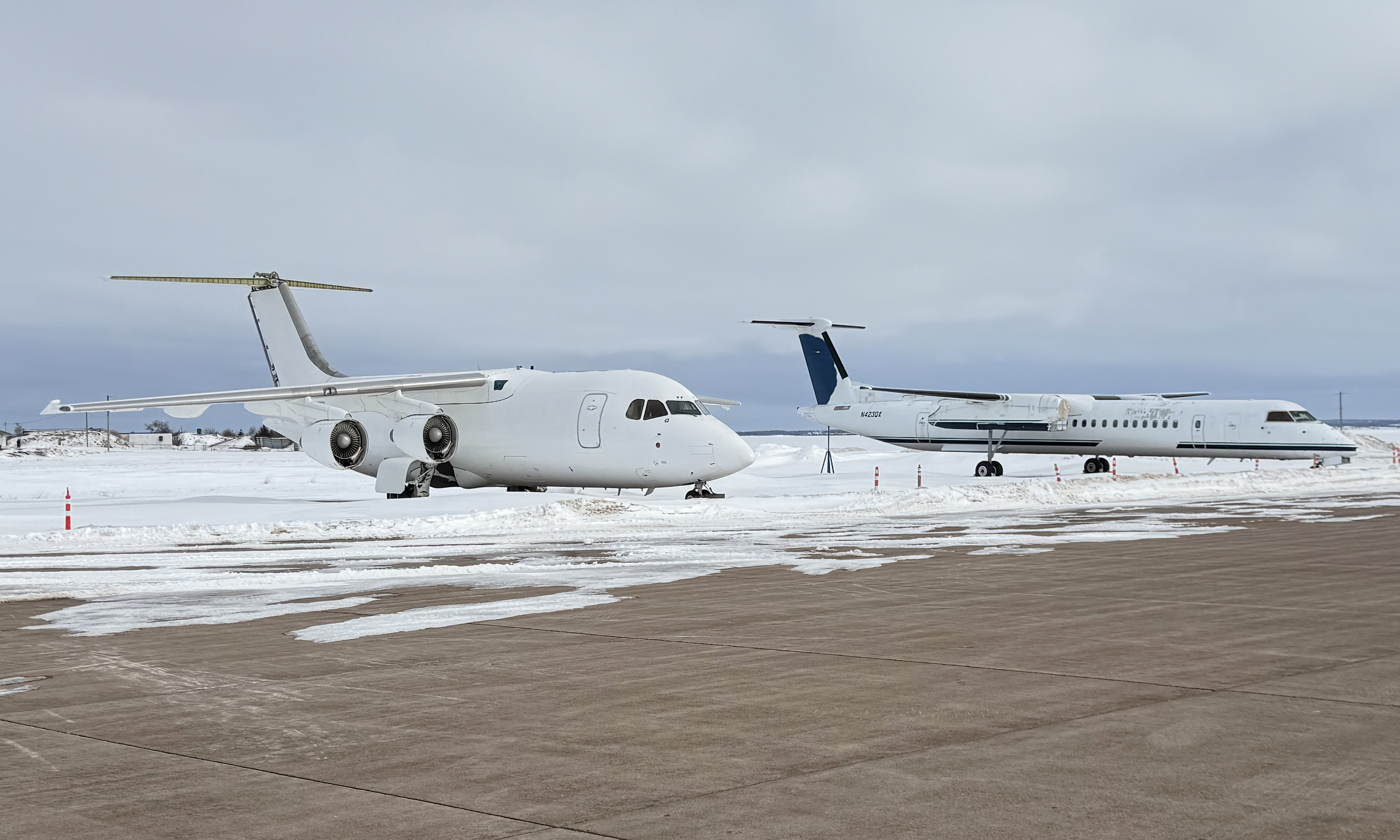
Stored aircraft at Summerside Airport

The largest single employer within the city is the Summerside Tax Centre, a Government of Canada agency which principally processes the Goods and Services Tax (GST).

The Slemon Park Business Centre hosts a concentration of several aerospace and transportation companies in former military buildings; StandardAero (formerly Vector Aerospace/Atlantic Turbines) repairs and overhauls Gas Turbine aircraft engines, Testori Americas produces interiors for aircraft and mass transit surface vehicles,Honeywell manufactures and repairs parts for aircraft, and Tronos Aviation provides aircraft leasing, maintenance and manufacturing services.

Amalgamated Dairies Limited is based in Summerside, founded in 1953 by six dairies as a co-operative and owned by dairy producers.

The outlying community of New Annan is home to the operations of Cavendish Farms, Prince Edward Island's largest private sector employer. Cavendish Farms maintains two large frozen foods processing plants in New Annan. Other outlying communities, such as Borden-Carleton have important employers for Summerside residents.

Since the closure of CFB Summerside in 1990, the city has been aggressive in courting new business opportunities and has created an Economic Development Office for the purpose of encouraging investment in the city.

== Government ==
The Summerside City Council is governed by a mayor and eight councillors who represent geographic areas called wards. Dan Kutcher has served as mayor since 2023.

The Summerside Police Department is responsible for law enforcement within the city. The East Prince Detachment of the Royal Canadian Mounted Police (RCMP) is located in North Bedeque, southeast of the city, however its only responsibility is to patrol, with the Summerside Police Department, the provincial Route 1A and Route 2 highways which pass along the east and north sides of the city.

== Politics ==
For elections to the Legislative Assembly of Prince Edward Island, Summerside is covered by Summerside-Wilmot, Summerside-South Drive, and Tyne Valley-Sherbrooke.

For elections to the House of Commons of Canada, Summerside is covered by Egmont.

== Education ==
Summerside has six English public schools: three elementary, one consolidated, one junior high, and one senior high school. The English Language School Board has an office in the city.

The city also has one French public school operated by the Commission scolaire de langue française.

Holland College, Prince Edward Island's community college system, maintains three facilities in Summerside;

- Summerside Waterfront Campus
- Marine Training Centre
- Atlantic Police Academy

The College of Piping and Celtic Performing Arts of Canada is also located in Summerside.

== Demographics ==
Federal census population history of Summerside (post-amalgamation)
| Year | Pop. | ±% |
|---|---|---|
| 1991 | 13,636 | — |
| 1996 | 14,525 | +6.5% |
| 2001 | 14,654 | +0.9% |
| 2006 | 14,500 | −1.1% |
| 2011 | 14,751 | +1.7% |
| 2016 | 14,829 | +0.5% |
| 2021 | 16,001 | +7.9% |
Source: Statistics Canada

Federal census population history of Summerside (pre-amalgamation)
| Year | Pop. | ±% |
|---|---|---|
| 1871 | 1,917 | — |
| 1881 | 2,853 | +48.8% |
| 1891 | 2,882 | +1.0% |
| 1901 | 2,875 | −0.2% |
| 1911 | 2,678 | −6.9% |
| 1921 | 3,228 | +20.5% |
| 1931 | 3,759 | +16.4% |
| 1941 | 5,034 | +33.9% |
| 1951 | 6,547 | +30.1% |
| 1956 | 7,242 | +10.6% |
| 1961 | 8,611 | +18.9% |
| 1966 | 10,042 | +16.6% |
| 1971 | 9,439 | −6.0% |
| 1976 | 8,592 | −9.0% |
| 1981 | 7,828 | −8.9% |
| 1986 | 8,020 | +2.5% |
| 1991 | 7,474 | −6.8% |
Source: Statistics Canada

In the 2021 Census of Population conducted by Statistics Canada, Summerside had a population of 16,001 living in 7,097 of its 7,393 total private dwellings, a change of 7.8% from its 2016 population of 14,839. With a land area of 28.21 km^{2} (10.89 sq mi), it had a population density of 567.2/km^{2} (1,469.1/sq mi) in 2021.

Panethnic groups in the City of Summerside (2001−2021)
| Panethnic group | 2021 | | 2016 | | 2011 | | 2006 | | 2001 | |
| Panethnic group | Pop. | % | Pop. | % | Pop. | % | Pop. | % | Pop. | % |
|---|---|---|---|---|---|---|---|---|---|---|
| European (Note: Statistic includes all persons that did not make up part of a visible minority or an indigenous identity.) | 13,830 | 88.97% | 13,735 | 94.85% | 13,840 | 96.11% | 13,895 | 97.37% | 14,065 | 98.18% |
| South Asian | 480 | 3.09% | 25 | 0.17% | 65 | 0.45% | 15 | 0.11% | 0 | 0% |
| Southeast Asian (Note: Statistic includes total responses of "Filipino" and "Southeast Asian" under visible minority section on census.) | 455 | 2.93% | 230 | 1.59% | 85 | 0.59% | 10 | 0.07% | 30 | 0.21% |
| Indigenous | 325 | 2.09% | 220 | 1.52% | 170 | 1.18% | 130 | 0.91% | 115 | 0.8% |
| East Asian (Note: Statistic includes total responses of "Chinese", "Korean", and "Japanese" under visible minority section on census.) | 210 | 1.35% | 120 | 0.83% | 115 | 0.8% | 25 | 0.18% | 20 | 0.14% |
| African | 125 | 0.8% | 90 | 0.62% | 0 | 0% | 120 | 0.84% | 75 | 0.52% |
| Middle Eastern (Note: Statistic includes total responses of "West Asian" and "Arab" under visible minority section on census.) | 80 | 0.51% | 20 | 0.14% | 0 | 0% | 10 | 0.07% | 30 | 0.21% |
| Latin American | 20 | 0.13% | 50 | 0.35% | 60 | 0.42% | 0 | 0% | 0 | 0% |
| Other/multiracial (Note: Statistic includes total responses of "Visible minority, n.i.e." and "Multiple visible minorities" under visible minority section on census.) | 30 | 0.19% | 10 | 0.07% | 0 | 0% | 60 | 0.42% | 0 | 0% |
| Total responses | 15,545 | 97.15% | 14,480 | 97.58% | 14,400 | 97.62% | 14,270 | 98.41% | 14,325 | 97.75% |
| Total population | 16,001 | 100% | 14,839 | 100% | 14,751 | 100% | 14,500 | 100% | 14,654 | 100% |
Note: Totals greater than 100% due to multiple origin responses

== Energy ==
First blade installed on Summerside's first wind turbine

The City of Summerside operates the only municipally owned electric utility in Prince Edward Island. After buying Charlottetown Light & Power in 1918, Maritime Electric consolidated electric distribution on the island. The company offered to take over the operations in Summerside, but backed down after citizens rejected various offers. The Summerside distribution grid has had an inter-connection with the Maritime Electric transmission grid since 1961.

Similar to Maritime Electric, Summerside Electric purchases the majority of its electricity from NB Power. In 2008, 76.5% of its power was acquired from NB Power. Although the Summerside Electric Commission has its own diesel engines at the Harvard Street Generating Station which can operate for several days independently of NB Power's supply, it is only used in exceptional circumstances such as when the NB Power or Maritime Electric transmission grids that feed the city are interrupted. They also run their engines on the last day of every month, for maintenance reasons and they sell that power back to NB Power.

In 2007 the city signed a 20-year agreement with a private wind energy company to supply about 23% of its electricity from a private wind farm in West Cape.

Construction started on a city owned wind farm in 2009 comprising four wind turbines, each capable of producing 3 megawatts of electricity. The wind farm became fully operational in late 2009 and was immediately tied into the city's power. Becoming Canada's first municipally owned and operated wind farm. On an average day the wind farm produces about 25% of the electricity for the entire city. At times when electricity usage in the city is low and the winds are high the wind farm has potential to produce more power than the city consumes.

== Medical services ==
The Prince County Hospital, located in the city's north end, is the main referral hospital in the western part of the province. Island Emergency Medical Services operates two Advanced Life Support Paramedic Ambulances 24/7 from its base downtown. One Ambulance Transfer Unit, and a Mobile Integrated Health Unit are also based in the city.

== Climate ==
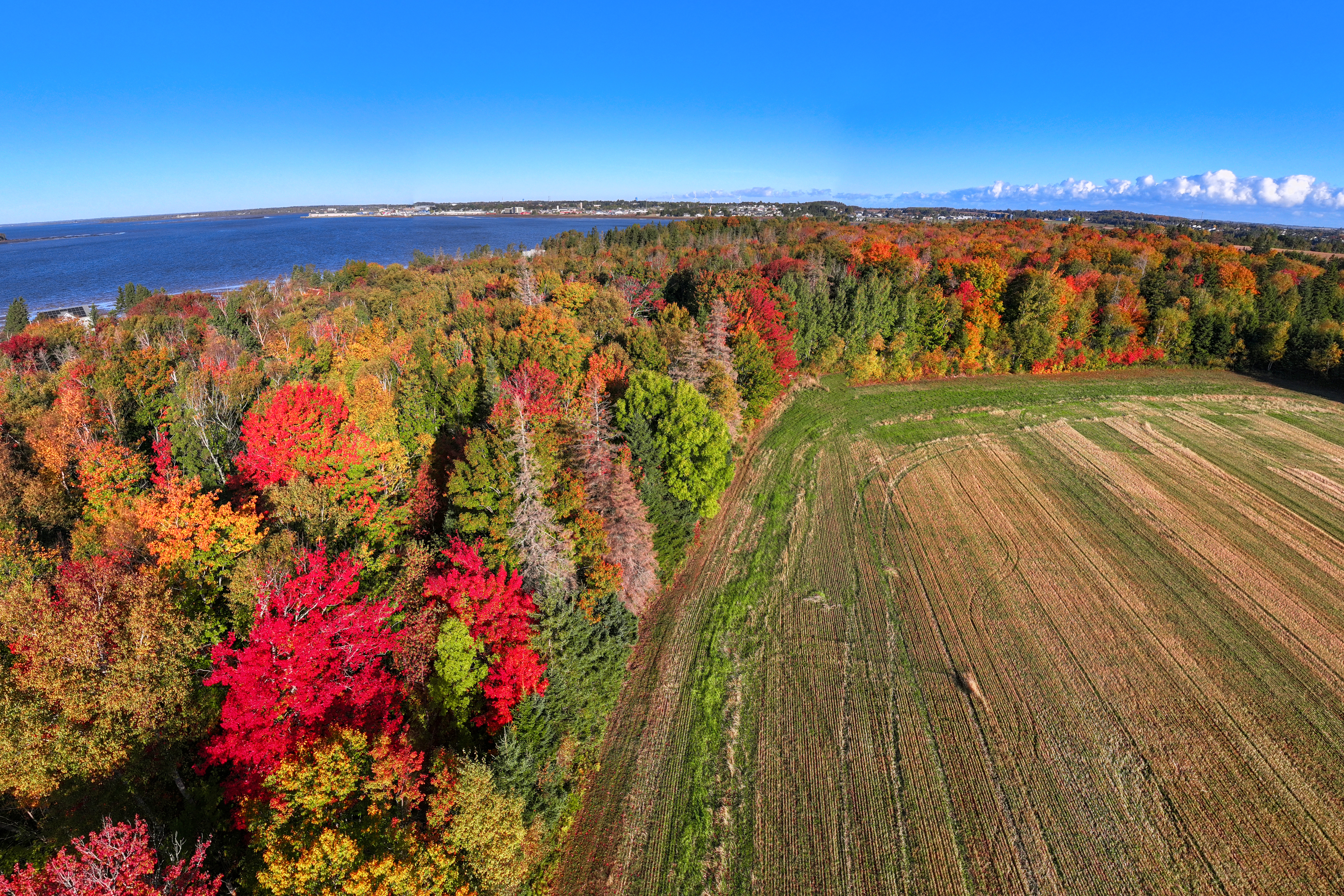
Hardwood forests south of downtown

Summerside has a humid continental climate (Köppen climate classification Dfb) with warm but somewhat moderate summers. It has cold winters with heavy snowfall, with some maritime moderation compared to areas farther inland.

The highest temperature ever recorded in Summerside was 35.0 °C (95.0 °F) on 12 August 2025. The coldest temperature ever recorded was −32.2 °C (−26 °F) on 12 January 1930.

Climate data for Summerside Airport WMO ID: 71702; coordinates 46°26′28″N 63°50′17″W; elevation: 12.2 m (40 ft); 1991–2020 normals, extremes 1929–present (Note: Extreme high and low temperatures were recorded at Summerside CDA (June 1929 to April 1942) and Summerside Airport (May 1942 to present).)
| Month | Jan | Feb | Mar | Apr | May | Jun | Jul | Aug | Sep | Oct | Nov | Dec | Year |
|---|---|---|---|---|---|---|---|---|---|---|---|---|---|
| Record high °C (°F) | 13.8 (56.8) | 12.8 (55.0) | 25.2 (77.4) | 23.9 (75.0) | 32.0 (89.6) | 32.2 (90.0) | 33.7 (92.7) | 35.0 (95.0) | 33.2 (91.8) | 28.1 (82.6) | 21.2 (70.2) | 15.6 (60.1) | 35.0 (95.0) |
| Mean maximum °C (°F) | 7.7 (45.9) | 6.4 (43.5) | 9.7 (49.5) | 17.7 (63.9) | 24.1 (75.4) | 27.8 (82.0) | 29.5 (85.1) | 29.3 (84.7) | 26.6 (79.9) | 20.8 (69.4) | 16.4 (61.5) | 10.7 (51.3) | 30.6 (87.1) |
| Mean daily maximum °C (°F) | −2.9 (26.8) | −2.6 (27.3) | 1.2 (34.2) | 7.3 (45.1) | 14.3 (57.7) | 19.7 (67.5) | 24.1 (75.4) | 23.8 (74.8) | 19.4 (66.9) | 13.0 (55.4) | 6.7 (44.1) | 0.9 (33.6) | 10.4 (50.7) |
| Daily mean °C (°F) | −7.1 (19.2) | −7.0 (19.4) | −2.7 (27.1) | 3.3 (37.9) | 9.6 (49.3) | 15.1 (59.2) | 19.6 (67.3) | 19.2 (66.6) | 14.9 (58.8) | 9.1 (48.4) | 3.3 (37.9) | −2.5 (27.5) | 6.2 (43.2) |
| Mean daily minimum °C (°F) | −11.3 (11.7) | −11.3 (11.7) | −6.6 (20.1) | −0.8 (30.6) | 4.9 (40.8) | 10.4 (50.7) | 15.0 (59.0) | 14.5 (58.1) | 10.4 (50.7) | 5.2 (41.4) | −0.1 (31.8) | −6.0 (21.2) | 2.0 (35.6) |
| Mean minimum °C (°F) | −21.3 (−6.3) | −22.1 (−7.8) | −16.4 (2.5) | −6.9 (19.6) | −0.8 (30.6) | 3.9 (39.0) | 10.1 (50.2) | 8.7 (47.7) | 2.6 (36.7) | −1.8 (28.8) | −8.0 (17.6) | −15.7 (3.7) | −23.7 (−10.7) |
| Record low °C (°F) | −32.2 (−26.0) | −30.0 (−22.0) | −28.9 (−20.0) | −14.0 (6.8) | −5.0 (23.0) | −1.9 (28.6) | 5.0 (41.0) | 4.4 (39.9) | −0.8 (30.6) | −6.7 (19.9) | −16.0 (3.2) | −25.6 (−14.1) | −32.2 (−26.0) |
| Average precipitation mm (inches) | 96.2 (3.79) | 74.9 (2.95) | 79.4 (3.13) | 84.2 (3.31) | 97.7 (3.85) | 91.3 (3.59) | 74.1 (2.92) | 92.7 (3.65) | 96.7 (3.81) | 87.7 (3.45) | 97.7 (3.85) | 100.3 (3.95) | 1,072.9 (42.24) |
| Average rainfall mm (inches) | 25.2 (0.99) | 24.9 (0.98) | 34.6 (1.36) | 61.3 (2.41) | 94.9 (3.74) | 91.3 (3.59) | 74.1 (2.92) | 92.7 (3.65) | 96.8 (3.81) | 87.0 (3.43) | 77.2 (3.04) | 49.2 (1.94) | 809.1 (31.85) |
| Average snowfall cm (inches) | 78.5 (30.9) | 53.4 (21.0) | 47.4 (18.7) | 22.2 (8.7) | 3.2 (1.3) | 0.0 (0.0) | 0.0 (0.0) | 0.0 (0.0) | 0.0 (0.0) | 0.7 (0.3) | 19.1 (7.5) | 53.5 (21.1) | 277.9 (109.4) |
| Average precipitation days (≥ 0.2 mm) | 17.4 | 13.6 | 14.9 | 15.1 | 15.4 | 14.1 | 12.4 | 13.2 | 13.5 | 14.4 | 16.8 | 17.3 | 177.9 |
| Average rainy days (≥ 0.2 mm) | 5.5 | 5.3 | 6.9 | 11.6 | 15.4 | 14.1 | 12.4 | 13.2 | 13.5 | 14.3 | 13.6 | 7.1 | 132.9 |
| Average snowy days (≥ 0.2 cm) | 14.6 | 10.9 | 10.4 | 5.8 | 0.93 | 0.0 | 0.0 | 0.0 | 0.0 | 0.80 | 5.3 | 13.1 | 61.8 |
| Average relative humidity (%) (at 1500 LST) | 74.7 | 71.8 | 69.1 | 65.9 | 63.3 | 64.9 | 64.7 | 64.6 | 64.6 | 66.7 | 72.5 | 76.5 | 68.3 |
| Average dew point °C (°F) | −9.8 (14.4) | −9.9 (14.2) | −5.9 (21.4) | −1.0 (30.2) | 4.8 (40.6) | 10.6 (51.1) | 15.2 (59.4) | 14.9 (58.8) | 11.1 (52.0) | 5.4 (41.7) | −0.3 (31.5) | −5.2 (22.6) | 2.6 (36.7) |
| Mean monthly sunshine hours | 108.9 | 118.3 | 139.9 | 155.6 | 202.4 | 231.7 | 255.7 | 234.4 | 174.4 | 130.4 | 86.8 | 80.9 | 1,919.3 |
| Percentage possible sunshine | 38.9 | 40.7 | 38.0 | 38.7 | 43.6 | 49.1 | 53.5 | 53.3 | 46.2 | 38.5 | 30.6 | 30.1 | 41.7 |
Source 1: Environment Canada (rain/rain days, snow/snow days and precipitation/precipitation days 1981-2010, sun 1971–2000)
Source 2: weatherstats.ca (for dewpoint and monthly&yearly average absolute maximum&minimum temperature)

== Attractions ==
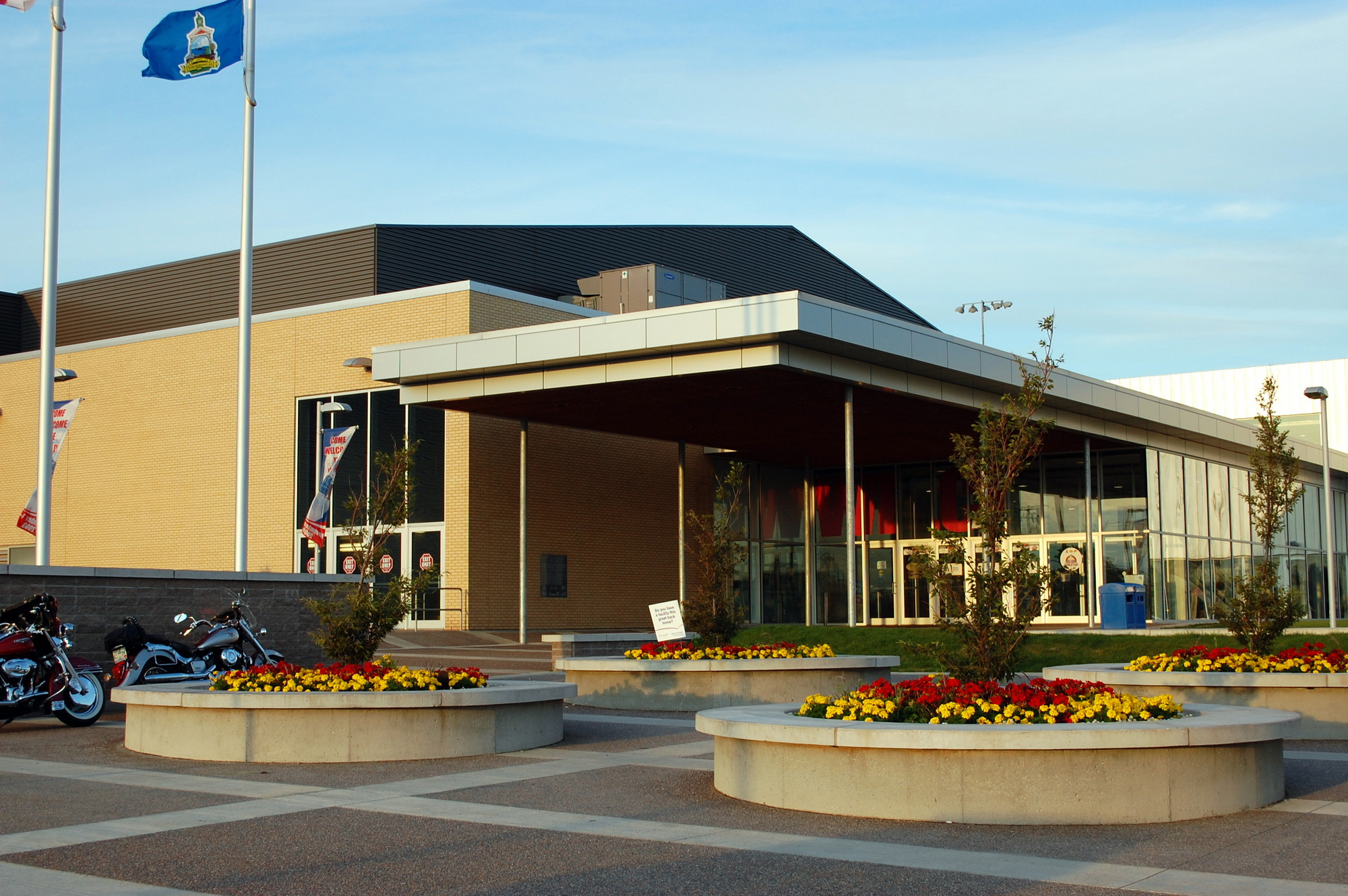
Credit Union Place, a sports and community centre

The Summerside Raceway is a standardbred harness racing track which is believed to be the oldest operating racing track in Canada, having opened in 1886. It is adjacent to Credit Union Place, the largest indoor sports facility in the province with a large hockey arena seating 4000, a bowling alley, a 25-metre swimming pool and other fitness and meeting facilities. Other attractions include the Harbourfront Theatre, the College of Piping and Celtic Performing Arts the Silver Fox Curling & Yacht Club, the Summerside Golf & Country Club, the PEI Sports Hall of Fame and Spinnakers' Landing.

The city has redeveloped several waterfront industrial sites, abandoned by the railway and marine terminal during the 1990s, into new parkland. A major reconstruction of the west end seawall has resulted in a new waterfront boardwalk for residents and visitors.

The former post office on Summer Street was designated a National Historic Site of Canada in 1983. The former railway station, designed by architect Charles Benjamin Chappell and built in 1927, was designated a National Historic Site of Canada in 2007.

The fish industry has also thrived recently and created a whole new division of tourism industry. According to 2016 demographics of the city, most of the tourism in recent years, is from families just wanting to go sail out on the ocean, and catch some fish to sell to a market, or bring home.

== Sports ==
Notable sporting events held by Summerside include:

- U-18 Men's Softball World Cup (1989 and 2005)
- 2009 Canada Summer Games (Co-hosted with Charlottetown)
- 2023 Canada Winter Games (Hosted Curling, Hockey, Boxing and Karate)

== Notable people ==
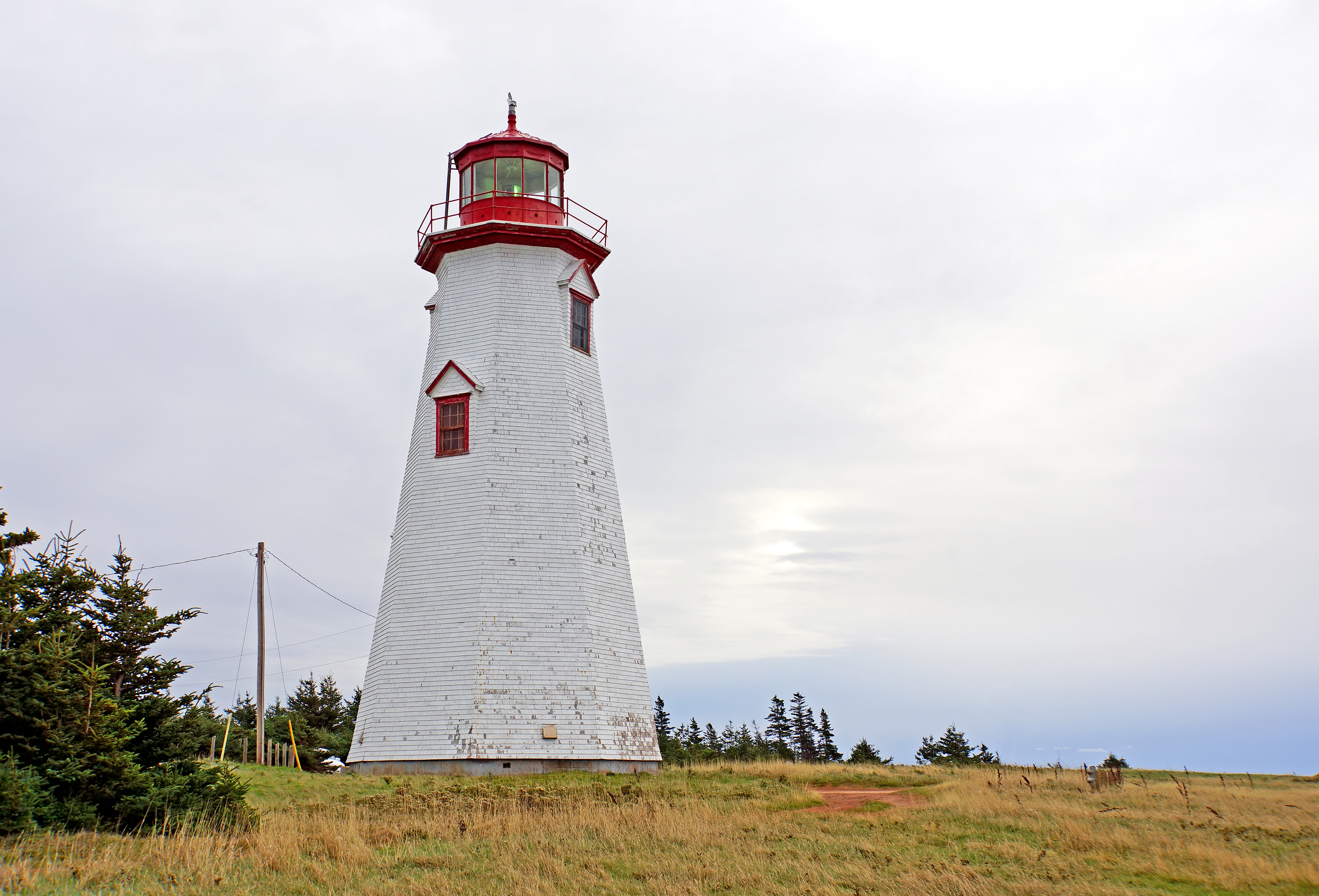
Seacow Head Light

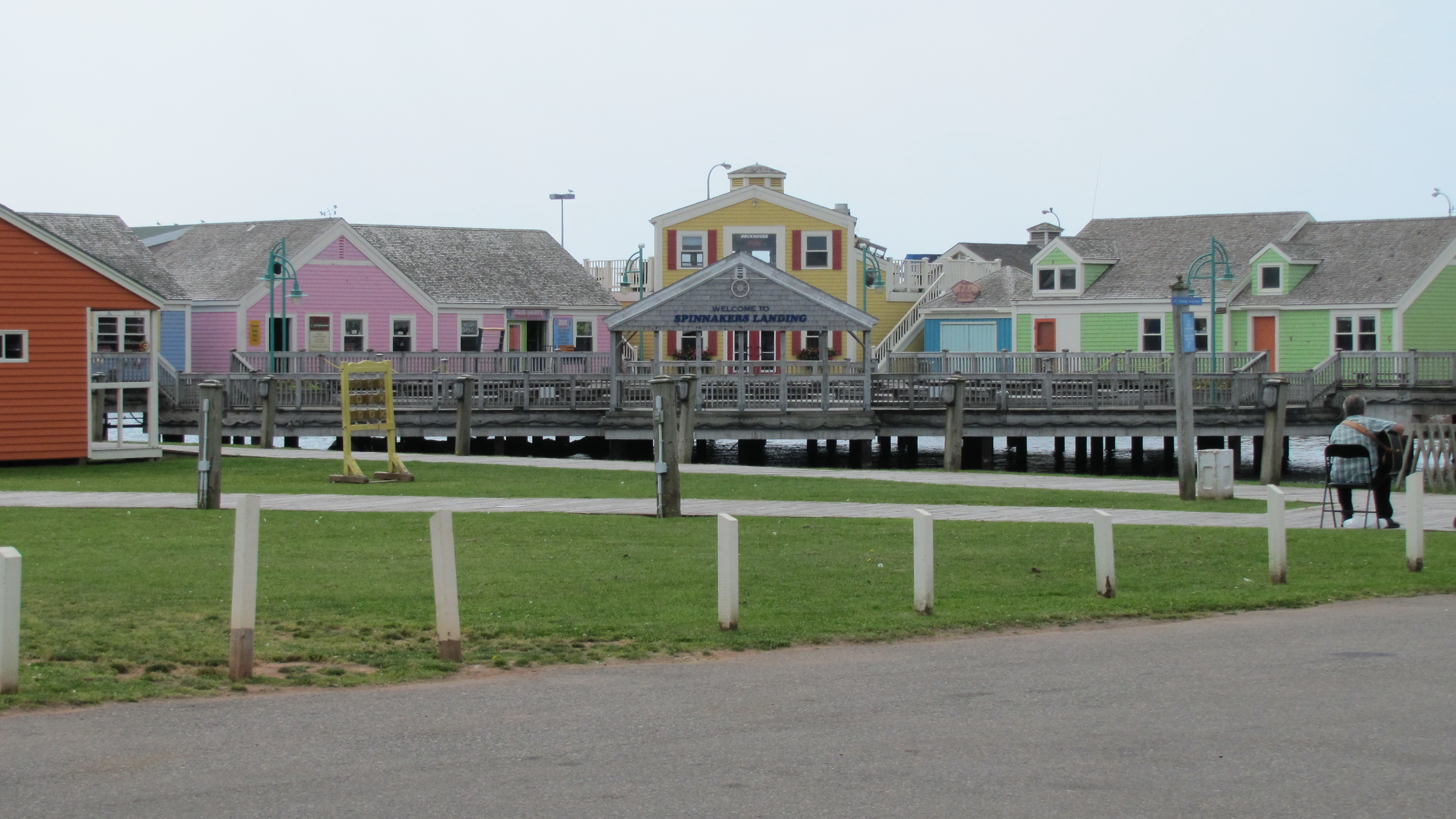
Spinnaker's Landing

- Darryl Boyce – former NHL player
- Billy Bridges – Olympic para-athlete
- Charles Cahill (1904–1954) – NHL player
- Dave Cameron – former NHL player and coach
- Alex Campbell – former premier of Prince Edward Island
- John Chabot – former NHL player
- Anita Daher - writer
- Tanya Davis – musician
- Noah Dobson – NHL player
- Gerard Gallant – NHL Coach and former NHL player
- Forbes Kennedy – former NHL player
- George Key – former mayor and former leader of the Prince Edward Island Progressive Conservative Party
- Troy Little – Graphic Novelist
- Grant MacDonald – Musician
- Doug MacLean – former NHL coach
- Catherine MacLellan – musician
- Heather Moyse – two-time Olympic gold medalist in bobsled
- Steve Ott – former NHL player
- Basil Stewart – Mayor, member of the Order of Canada
- Mark Strand – poet
- Errol Thompson – former NHL player
- Al Tuck – Musician
- Alli Walker - Musician, model
- Nathan Wiley – Musician

Summerside was home for three years to the fictional Anne Shirley of the Anne of Green Gables series by Canadian author Lucy Maud Montgomery. Anne resides in the town while principal of Summerside High School, in the book Anne of Windy Poplars.

== Media ==
Summerside has one radio station licensed to it, FM 102.1 CJRW-FM, which plays an adult contemporary format. CJRW is the only commercial radio station in the province whose studios are located outside of Charlottetown. Summerside is otherwise served by media based in Charlottetown. CBC Television has its Prince County bureau situated in Summerside.

Summerside's weekly newspaper is the Journal Pioneer. The province's French weekly newspaper, La Voix acadienne, is also based in the city.

== Sister Cities ==
- (United Kingdom) – Stirling, Scotland, UK
- (United States) - Dunedin, Florida

== See also ==
- List of historic places in Summerside, Prince Edward Island
