= 1871 Canadian census =

First regularly scheduled Canadian census

- April 2, 1871

General information
- Country: Canada
- Authority: Department of Agriculture (Census Branch)
- Website: bac-lac.gc.ca (1871)

Results
- Total population: 3,485,761
- Most populous province: Ontario (1,620,851)
- Least populous province: New Brunswick (285,594)

The 1871 Canadian census marked the first regularly scheduled collection of national statistics of the Canadian population on April 2, 1871, as required by section 8 of the British North America Act. The constitution required a census to be taken in 1871 and every tenth year thereafter. Parliament implemented the requirements of the constitution through the Census Act of May 12, 1870. In the first census, the population of Canada was enumerated to be 3,485,761.

All inhabitants of Canada were included, including Aboriginals. While this was the first national census of Canada, only four provinces were enumerated: Ontario, Quebec, New Brunswick, and Nova Scotia. Other areas of Canada continued to be enumerated in separate censuses. The results of the 1871 census, in both English and French, were reported in a five-volume set.

The following census was the 1881 census.

== Questionnaire ==
The questionnaire was on a variety of subjects and asked 211 questions including area, land holdings, vital statistics, religion, education, administration, the military, justice, agriculture, commerce, industry, and finance. Information was collected in tabular form on population, houses and other buildings, lands, industries, and institutions. The population section included the age, sex, religion, education, race, and occupation of each person, although not every household answered all 211 questions.

== Data products ==
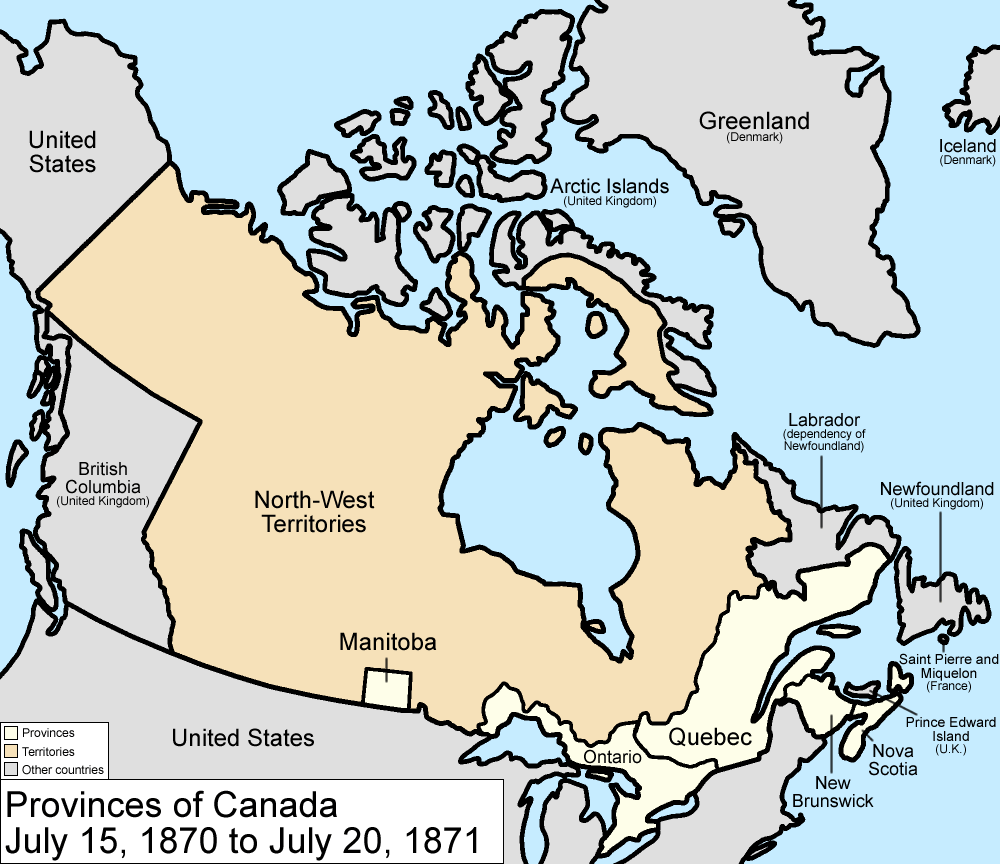
Canada provinces July 1870 – July 1871

As the data were compiled, Statistics Canada released various census data products.

=== Population by province ===
Population of the provinces and territories:

| Province | Males | Females | Total |
|---|---|---|---|
| Nova Scotia | 193,792 | 194,008 | 387,800 |
| New Brunswick | 145,888 | 139,706 | 285,594 |
| Quebec | 596,041 | 595,475 | 1,191,516 |
| Ontario | 828,590 | 792,261 | 1,620,851 |
| Canada (official 1871) | 1,764,311 | 1,721,450 | 3,485,761 |
| Manitoba | | | 25,228 |
| British Columbia | | | 36,247 |
| North-West Territories | | | 48,000 |
| Total Canada (with estimates) | 1,869,--- | 1,820,--- | 3,689,257 |

Manitoba and North-West Territories joined the Canadian Confederation on July 15, 1870, but were not included in the 1871 official census of Canada. In addition, British Columbia joined the Canadian confederation on July 20, 1871, after the census date of April 2, 1871. In Manitoba, a separate census took place on October 27, 1870.

Statistics Canada has included estimates for all three of these jurisdictions – total population only – in the same stated source, though totals do not add (see notes at source). Statistics Canada also provides the 1871 totals by sex for Canada, adjusted with their estimates for Manitoba and North-West Territories and British Columbia.

== Religion ==
Results for religion in 1871 were as follows.

| Religion | Population | Percent (%) |
|---|---|---|
| Adventist | 6,179 | 0.18 |
| Anglican | 494,049 | 14.17 |
| Baptist | 239,343 | 6.87 |
| Brethren | 2,305 | — |
| Christian | — | — |
| Congregationalist | 21,829 | 0.63 |
| Evangelical Association | 4,701 | 0.13 |
| Friends (Quaker) | 7,345 | — |
| Greek Church | 18 | — |
| Jews | 1,115 | 0.03 |
| Lutheran | 37,935 | 1.09 |
| Methodist | 567,091 | 16.27 |
| Mormon | 534 | 0.02 |
| No religion | 5,146 | 0.15 |
| Pagan | 1,886 | 0.05 |
| Plymouth Brethren | 2,229 | |
| Presbyterian | 544,998 | 15.63 |
| Protestant | 10,146 | 0.29 |
| Roman Catholic | 1,492,029 | 42.80 |
| Unitarian | 2,275 | — |
| Other sects | 27,553 | — |
| Not given | 17,055 | 0.49 |
| Canada | 3,485,761 | 100.0 |

== Origins ==
The figures for 1871 are for the four original provinces (Ontario, Quebec, New Brunswick, Nova Scotia) only.

| Origins | Population | Percent (%) |
|---|---|---|
| European | 3,433,315 | 98.5 |
| Irish | 846,414 | 24.3 |
| English | 706,369 | 20.3 |
| Scotch | 549,946 | 15.8 |
| Welsh | 7,773 | 0.2 |
| Totals, British | 2,110,502 | 60.6 |
| French | 1,082,940 | 31.1 |
| German | 202,991 | 5.8 |
| Dutch | 29,662 | 0.9 |
| Swiss | 2,962 | 0.1 |
| Scandinavian | 1,623 | 0.0 |
| Italian | 1,035 | 0.0 |
| Spanish & Portuguese | 829 | 0.0 |
| Russian | 607 | 0.0 |
| Greek | 39 | 0.0 |
| Other | 52,571 | 1.5 |
| Native Indian & Inuit (Eskimo) | 23,037 | 0.7 |
| Black | 21,496 | 0.6 |
| Hebrew | 125 | 0.0 |
| Indian | 11 | 0.0 |
| Various | 341 | 0.0 |
| Unspecified | 7,561 | 0.2 |
| Canada | 3,485,761 | 100.0 |

== See also ==
- Census in Canada
- Canadians
- United States census
- Population and housing censuses by country
