= List of protected areas of Prince Edward Island =

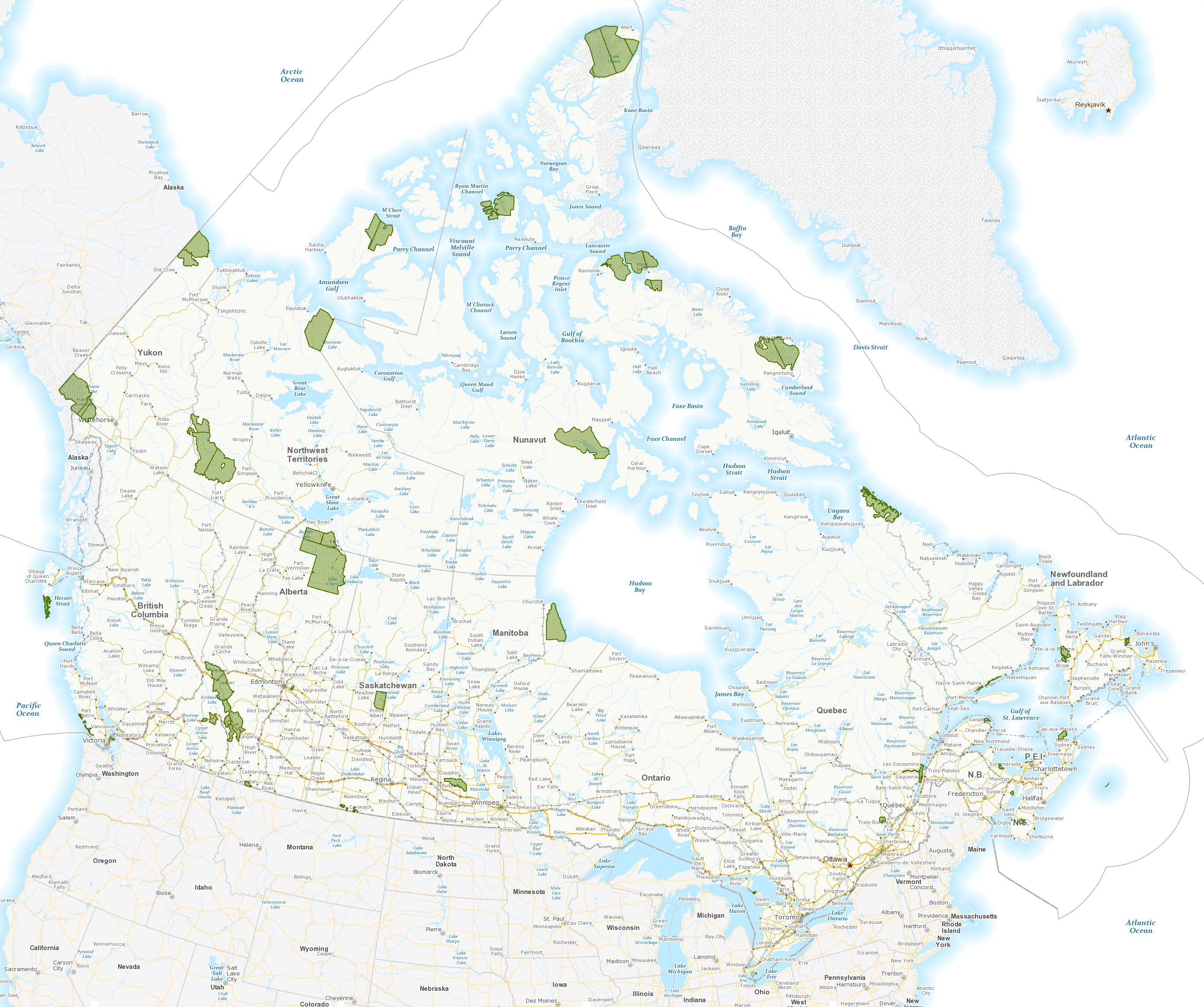
Canada's National Parks and National Reserves by provinces and territories

This is a list of protected areas of Prince Edward Island in Canada.

== National Parks and National Historic Sites ==
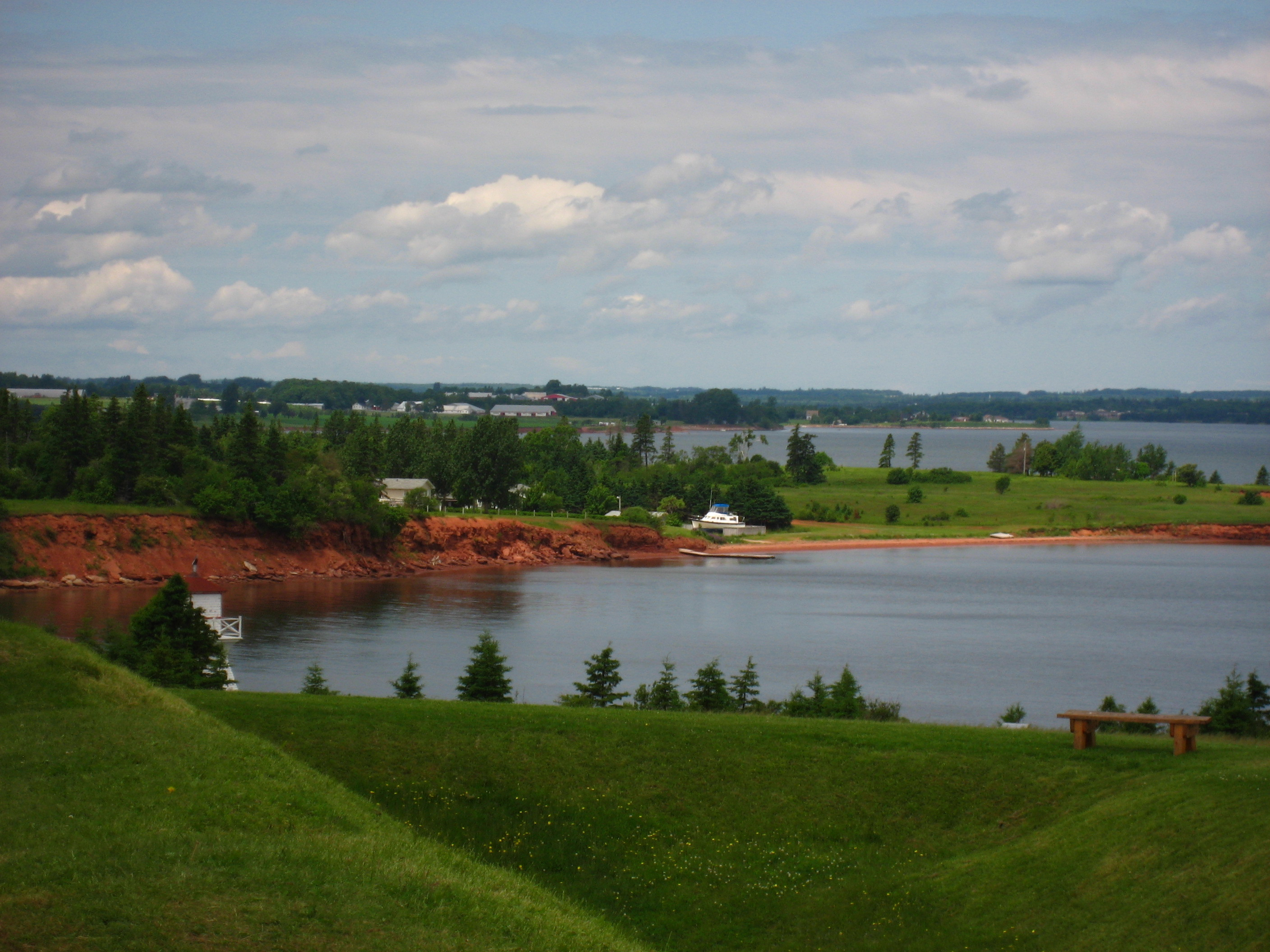
Skmaqn–Port-la-Joye–Fort Amherst

- Ardgowan
- Pituamkek National Park Reserve
- Prince Edward Island National Park
- Province House
- Skmaqn–Port-la-Joye–Fort Amherst

== Provincial parks ==
=== Kings County ===
| Name | Coordinates |
|---|---|
| Basin Head Provincial Park | 46.37763889°N 62.10913889°W |
| Brudenell River Provincial Park | 46.2096°N 62.5886°W |
| Buffaloland Provincial Park | |
| Kings Castle Provincial Park | 46.023°N 62.5617°W |
| Panmure Island Provincial Park | 46.14016667°N 62.46997222°W |
| Red Point Provincial Park | 46.2844°N 63.0257°W |
| Sally's Beach Provincial Park | 46.2611°N 62.3788°W |

=== Prince County ===
| Name | Image | Coordinates |
|---|---|---|
| Belmont Provincial Park | | 46.4334°N 62.8545°W |
| Bloomfield Provincial Park | | 46.6613°N 64.0531°W |
| Cabot Beach Provincial Park | | 46.5573°N 63.7043°W |
| Cedar Dunes Provincial Park | | 46.6222°N 64.3819°W |
| Chelton Beach Provincial Park | | 46.30394444°N 63.74716667°W |
| Green Park Provincial Park | | 46.576°N 63.9653°W |
| Jacques Cartier Provincial Park | | 46.85122222°N 64.013°W |
| Linkletter Provincial Park | | 46.4027°N 63.8504°W |
| Mill River Provincial Park | | 46.7451°N 64.1209°W |
| Union Corner Provincial Park | | 46.3882°N 63.9929°W |

=== Queens County ===
| Name | Coordinates |
|---|---|
| Argyle Shore Provincial Park | 46.16411111°N 63.36363889°W |
| Bonshaw Provincial Park | 46.1925°N 63.3535°W |
| Brookvale Provincial Park | 46.2806°N 63.4097°W |
| Northumberland Provincial Park | 45.96788889°N 62.70911111°W |
| Pinette Park Provincial Park | 46.05911111°N 62.89938889°W |
| Strathgartney Provincial Park | 46.2788°N 63.6237°W |
| Wood Islands Provincial Park | 45.9561°N 62.7411°W |

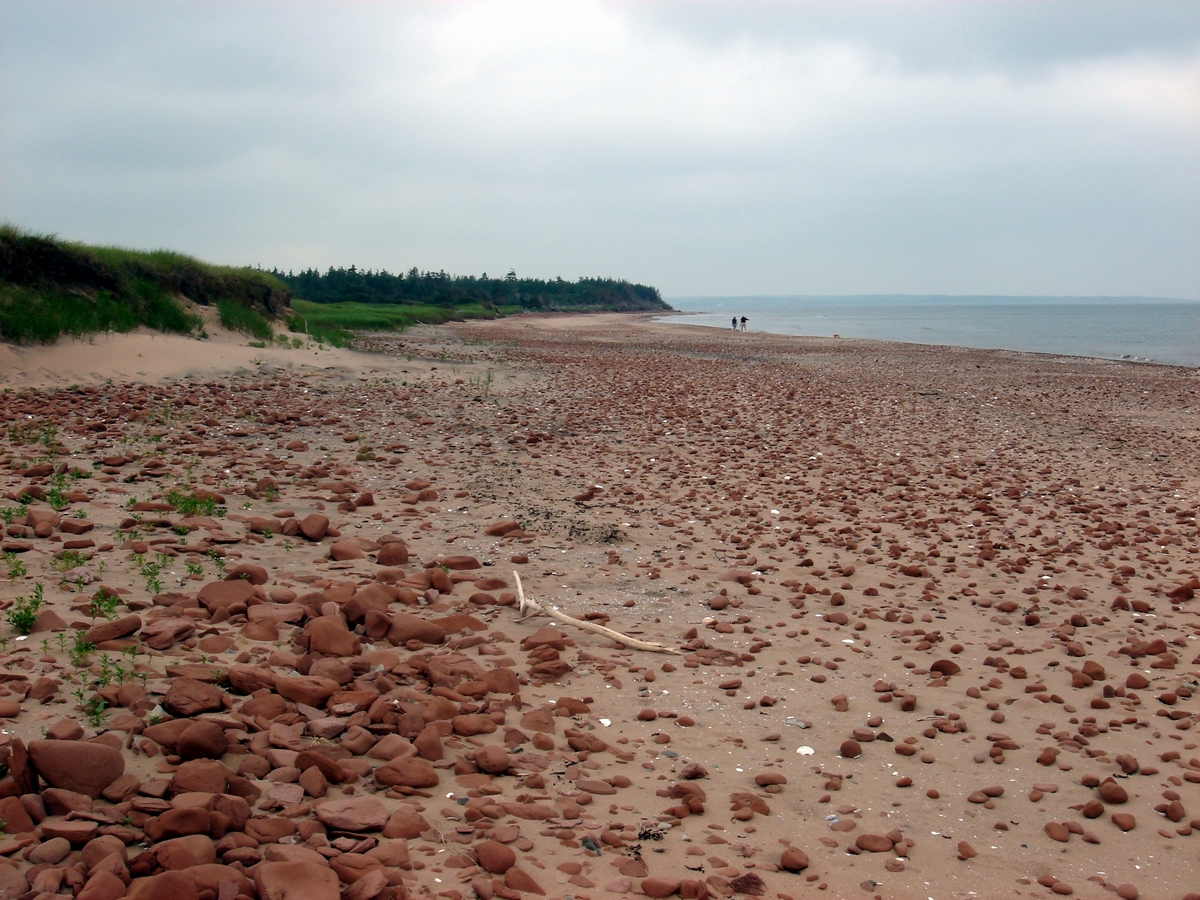
Prince Edward Island National Park

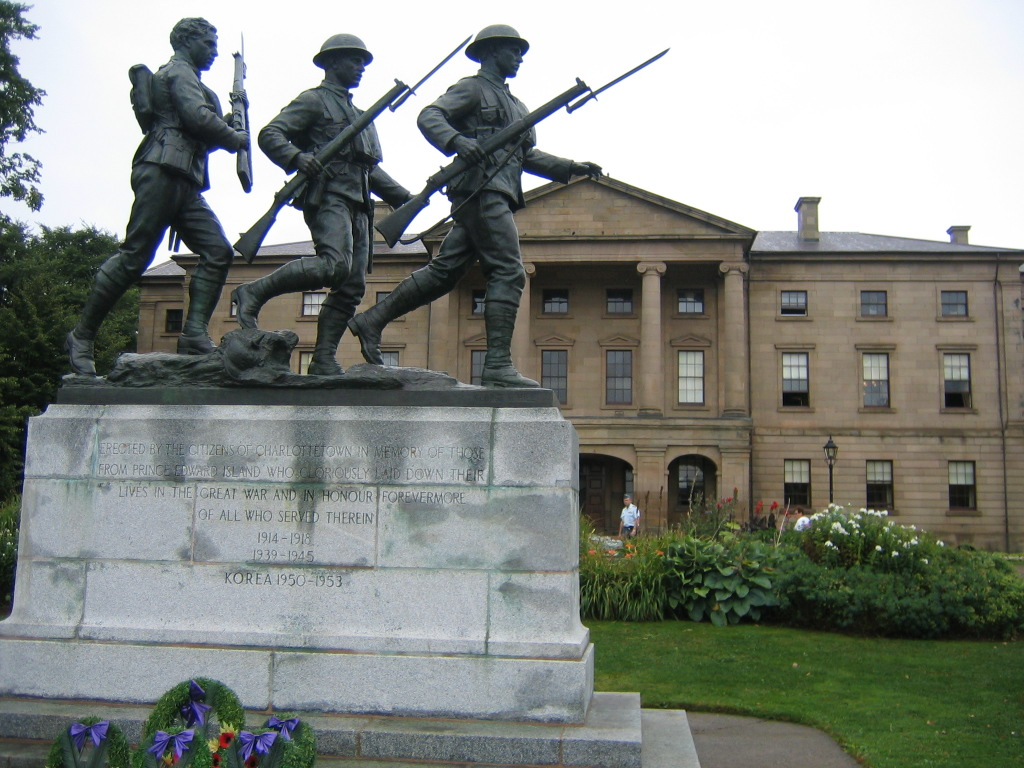
Province House

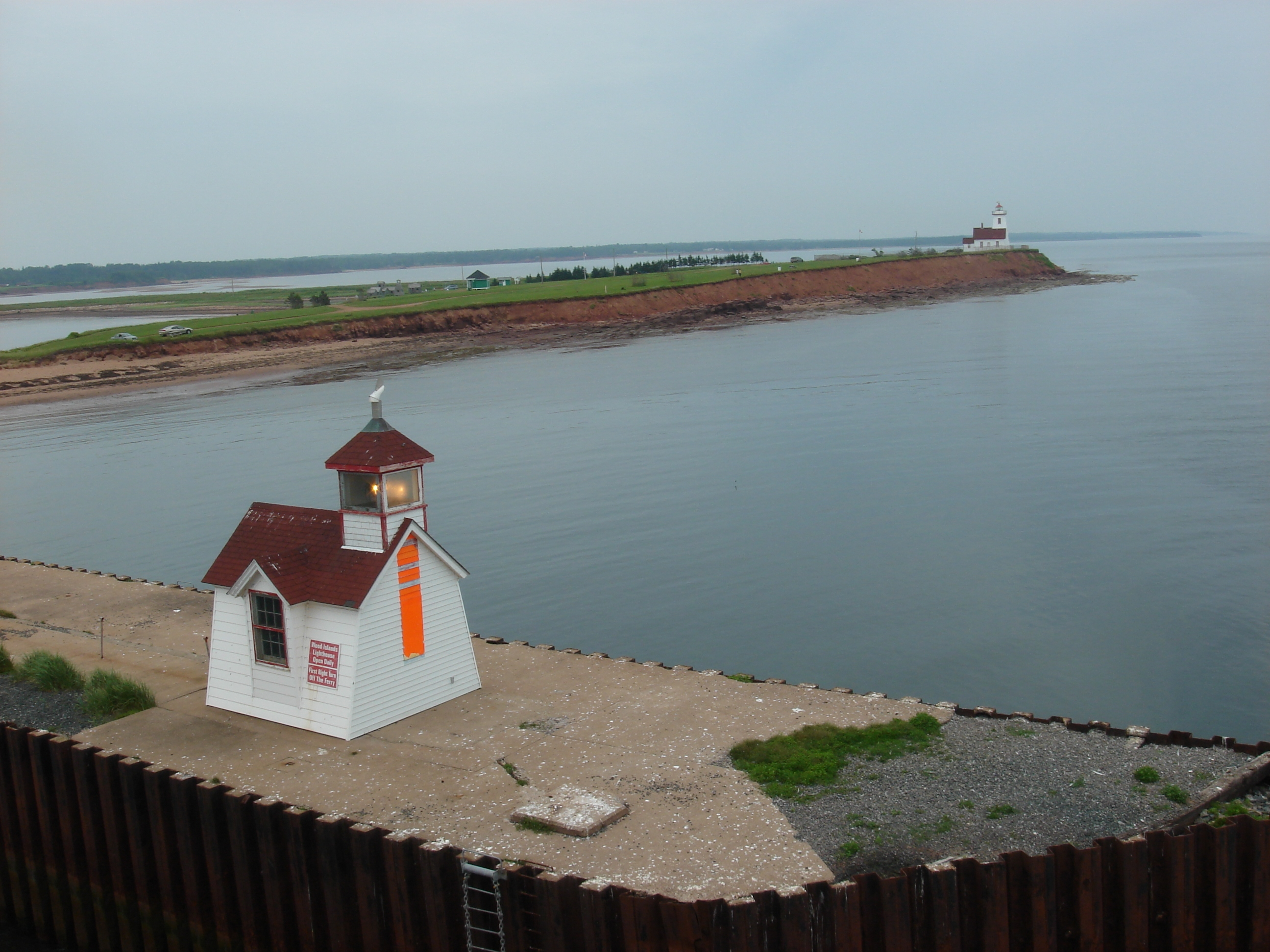
Wood Islands Provincial Park

== Municipal parks ==
=== Charlottetown ===
- Confederation Landing Park
- Connaught Square
- Hillsborough Square
- Kings Square
- Rochford Square
- Queen Elizabeth Park
- Victoria Park

=== Summerside ===
- Rotary Park
- Queen Elizabeth Park

== See also ==
- List of Canadian protected areas
