= BPP =

BPP may refer to:

== Education ==
- BPP Holdings, a holding company based in the United Kingdom
- BPP Law School, a law school based in the United Kingdom and a constituent school of BPP University
- BPP University, a private university based in the United Kingdom

== Mathematics ==
- Bounded-error probabilistic polynomial time, a class of decision problems in computational complexity theory
- Bin packing problem a problem in computational complexity theory

== Medicine ==
- Biophysical profile, a prenatal ultrasound evaluation of fetal well-being
- BPP (also Brom PP), a medicine used for treatment of upper respiratory tract infection et al., in tablet or other form, with Brompheniramine, Phenylephrine and Phenylpropanolamine as active ingredients.

== Places ==
- Bang Pa-in Palace, the former Summer Palace of Thai kings.
- Bandar Puteri Puchong, a township in Puchong, Selangor, Malaysia
- Beckenham Place Park, a local nature reserve in southeastern London
- Belmont Provincial Park, a provincial park, Prince Edward Island, Canada
- Bình Phước Province, a province of Vietnam
- Black Patch Park, a park in Smethwick, England
- Black Pudding Peak, an isolated mountain Prince Albert Mountains, Victoria Land, Antarctica
- Blomidon Provincial Park, a provincial park in Nova Scotia, Canada.
- Bloomfield Provincial Park a provincial park, Prince Edward Island, Canada
- Bogwang Phoenix Park, a ski resort in South Korea
- Bonnechere Provincial Park, a provincial park on Round Lake, Ontario, Canada
- Bonshaw Provincial Park, a provincial park, Prince Edward Island, Canada
- Brookvale Provincial Park, a provincial park, Prince Edward Island, Canada
- Brown-Lowery Provincial Park, a provincial park in Alberta, Canada
- Buffaloland Provincial Park, a provincial park, Prince Edward Island, Canada

== Politics ==
- Bavarian People's Party
- Bangon Pilipinas Party, a political party in the Philippines
- Belize Progressive Party, a political party in Belize
- Bessarabian Peasants' Party
- Bhutan Peoples' Party
- Bihar People's Party, a political party Bihar state, India
- Black Panther Party, a black left-wing organization, active from 1966 to 1976
- Bosnian-Herzegovinian Patriotic Party
- Botswana People's Party
- British People's Party (disambiguation)
- Brunei People's Party

== Technology ==
- Bits per pixel, also known as color depth
- Beam parameter product, a measure of laser beam quality
- BeanShell preprocessor
- Breakthrough Propulsion Physics Program, a NASA research project 1996–2002, studying hypothetical spacecraft propulsion

== Other ==
- B.P.P. album by Ukrainian band Faktychno Sami
- MIT Billion Prices project, real-time inflation estimate from MIT
- Bali Peace Park, organization to found a Bali Peace Park
- Banco Privado Português, a defunct Portuguese bank, based in Lisbon
- Birmingham Parks Police, Birmingham, United Kingdom, park police 1912-1962
- Brighton Parks Police, Brighton, United Kingdom, park police
- Bekenntnisbruderschaft St. Peter und Paul, German Lutheran High Church brotherhood
- Bryant Park Project, radio show on NPR
- Buakaw Por. Pramuk, Thai Muay Thaifighter
- Border Patrol Police, the border guard of Thailand
- North American Bird Phenology Program, database on North American bird migration patterns and population
- British protected persons, class of British nationality
- Banca Popolare Pugliese, Italian bank
- Bund Philatelistischer Prüfer, German philatelic expertising guild
- Bavarian Political Police, forerunner of the Gestapo in Bavaria (1933–36)
