= Geography of Prince Edward Island =

Prince Edward Island
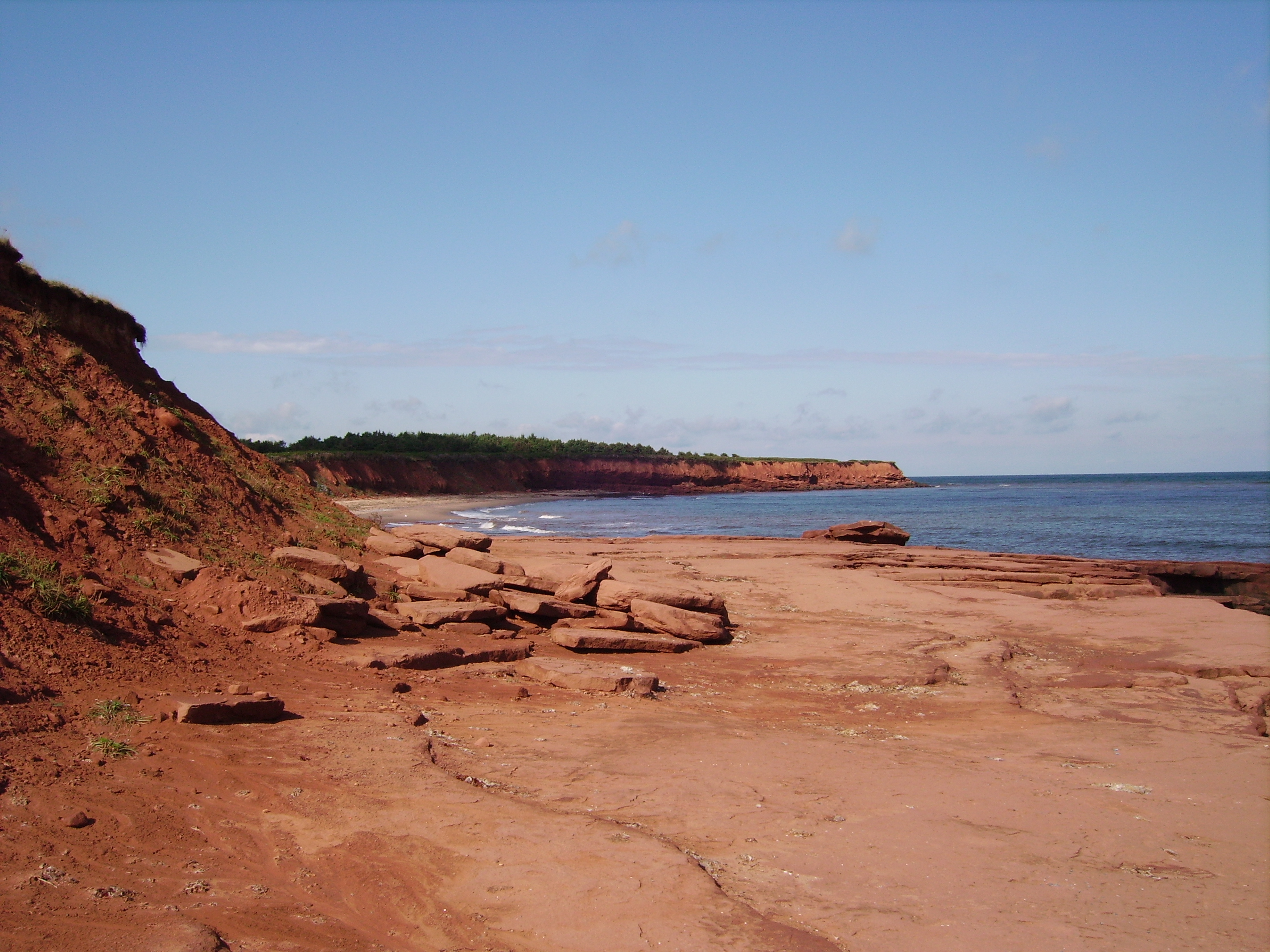
- The coast of Prince Edward Island around Cavendish

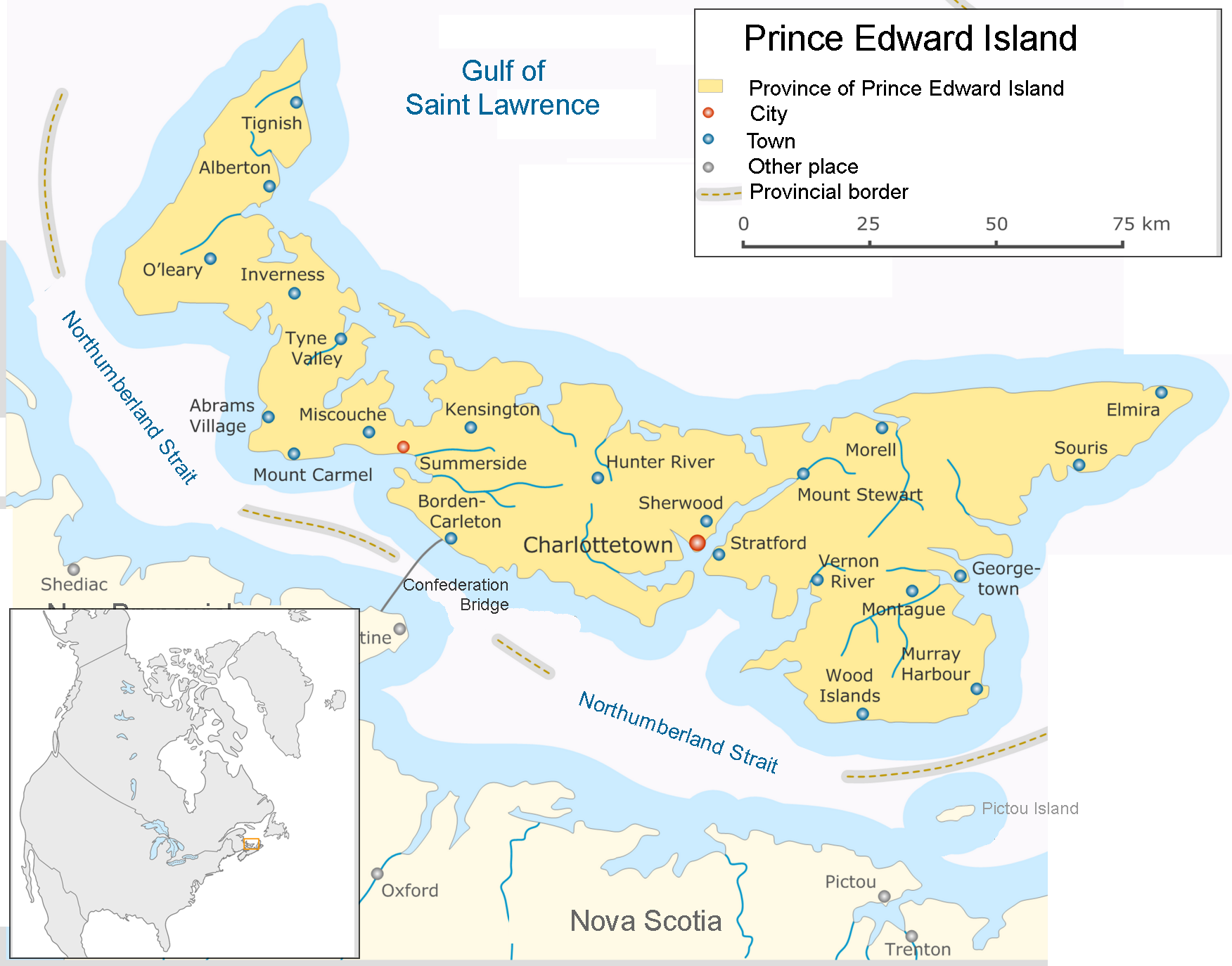

Geography
- Location: Gulf of St. Lawrence
- Total islands: 62
- Major islands: 1
- Area: 5,740.96 (Note: Main island only) km^{2} (2,216.60 sq mi) (2026)
- Area rank: 23rd in Canada & 105th worldwide
- Highest elevation: 138.2 m (453.4 ft)
- Highest point: Springton Peak

Administration
- Canada
- Province: Prince Edward Island
- Largest settlement: Charlottetown (pop. 38,809 (2021))
- Premier: Rob Lantz (PEIPC)

Demographics
- Population: 154,331 (2021)
- Pop. density: 27.2/km^{2} (70.4/sq mi)
- Ethnic groups: Scottish (38.0%), English (28.7%), Irish (27.9%), French (21.3%), German (4.0%), and Dutch (3.1%)

The geography of Prince Edward Island is mostly pastoral with red soil, white sand, and scattered communities. Known as the "Garden of the Gulf", the island is located in the Gulf of St. Lawrence north of Nova Scotia and east of New Brunswick, with which it forms the Northumberland Strait.

== Overview ==
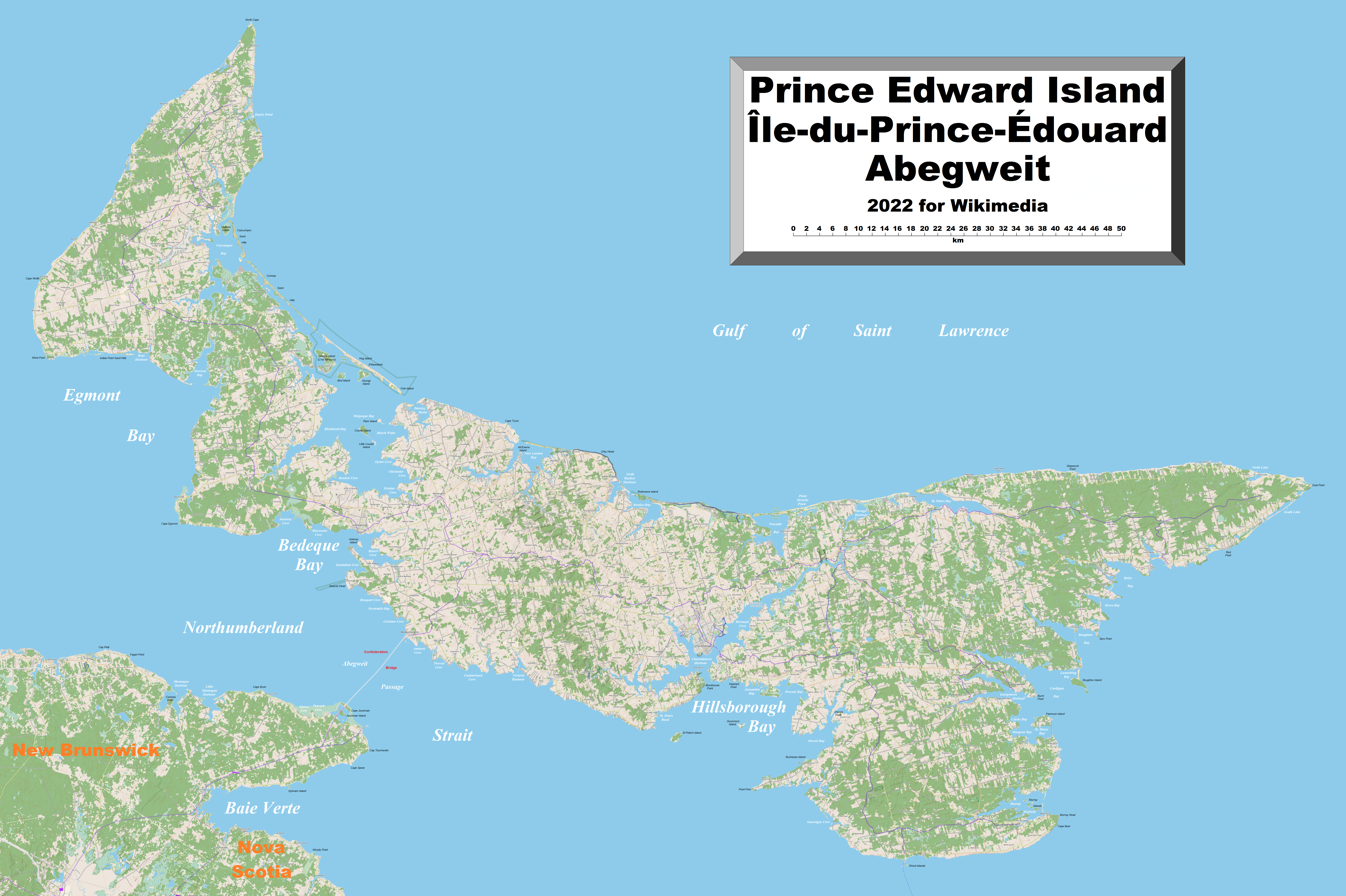
Detailed map of Prince Edward Island

Prince Edward Island (PEI) consists of the capital city Charlottetown, as well as urban towns Cornwall and Stratford and a developing urban fringe. A smaller urban area surrounds Summerside Harbour, situated on the southern shore, 40 km (25 mi) west of Charlottetown Harbour, and consists primarily of the city of Summerside. As with all natural harbours on the island, Charlottetown and Summerside harbours are created by rias. The highest point of land is Springton Peak at Springton in Queens County, rising 152 m (499 ft) above sea level.

The island's landscape is pastoral; rolling hills, pristine forests, white sand beaches, ocean coves and the red soil have given PEI a reputation as a province of outstanding natural beauty. A number of laws have been passed by the provincial government to attempt to preserve the landscape through regulation, although the lack of consistent enforcement and absence of province-wide zoning and land use planning has resulted in some unsightly development in recent years.

The island's lush landscape has had a strong bearing on the island's culture. During the late Victorian era, author Lucy Maud Montgomery used the island as the setting of her novel Anne of Green Gables. Today, the island attracts tourists in all seasons, with popular leisure attractions including beaches, golf courses, and ecotourism.

According to the United States Geological Survey, Esri, and the United Nations Environment Programme - World Conservation Monitoring Centre as of 2026, the area of the main island is 5,740.96 km^{2} (2,216.60 sq mi), making it the 23rd largest island in Canada and the 105th worldwide.

== Communities ==
Most rural communities on Prince Edward Island are based on small-scale agriculture, and the average size of farm properties is less than other areas in Canada. There is an increasing amount of industrial farming as older farm properties are consolidated and modernized.

== Coastline ==
The coastline of the island consists of a combination of long beaches, dunes, red sandstone cliffs, saltwater marshes and numerous bays and harbours. The beaches, dunes and sandstone cliffs consist of sedimentary rock and other material with a high iron concentration which oxidizes upon exposure to the air. The geological properties of white silica sand found at Basin Head are unique in the province; the sand grains cause a scrubbing noise as they rub against each other under pressure. Large dune fields on the north shore can be found on barrier islands at the entrances to various bays and harbours. The sand dunes at Greenwich have a shifting, parabolic dune system that is home to a variety of birds and rare plants and is also a site of significant archaeological interest.

== Climate ==
The climate of the island is a maritime climate considered to be moderate and strongly influenced by the surrounding seas. As such, it is milder than inland locations owing to the warm waters from the Gulf of St. Lawrence. The climate is characterized by changeable weather throughout the year; it has some of the most variable day-to-day weather in Canada, in which specific weather conditions seldom last for long.

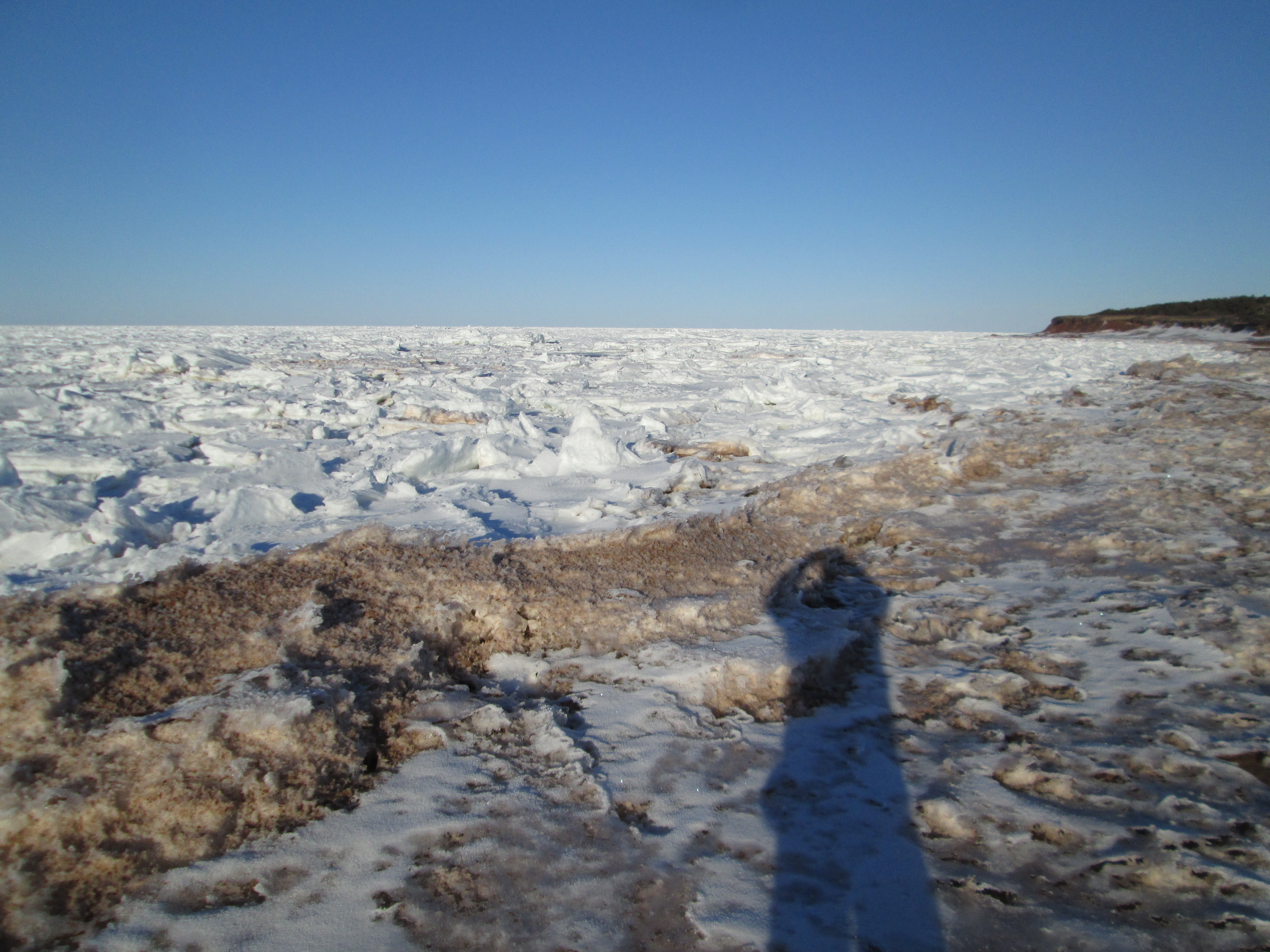
Because the Gulf of St. Lawrence freezes over, the island's climate is similar to a continental climate as opposed to an oceanic climate.

During July and August, the average daytime high in PEI is 23 °C (73 °F); however, the temperature can sometimes exceed 30 °C (86 °F) during these months. In the winter months of January and February, the average daytime high is −3.3 °C (26.1 °F). The Island receives an average yearly rainfall of 855 mm (33.7 in) and an average yearly snowfall of 285 cm (112 in).

Winters are moderately cold and long but are milder than inland locations, with clashes of cold Arctic air and milder Atlantic air causing frequent temperature swings. The climate is considered to be more humid continental climate than oceanic since the Gulf of St. Lawrence freezes over, thus eliminating any moderation. The mean temperature is −7 °C (19 °F) in January. During the winter months, the island usually has many storms (which may produce rain as well as snow) and blizzards since during this time, storms originating from the North Atlantic or the Gulf of Mexico frequently pass through. Springtime temperatures typically remain cool until the sea ice has melted, usually in late April or early May.

Summers are moderately warm, but rarely uncomfortable, with the daily maximum temperature only occasionally reaching as high as 30 °C (86 °F). Autumn is a pleasant season, as the moderating Gulf waters delay the onset of frost, although storm activity increases compared to the summer. There is ample precipitation throughout the year, although it is heaviest in the late autumn, early winter and mid spring.

The following climate chart depicts the average conditions of Charlottetown, as an example of the small province's climate.

Climate data for Charlottetown (Charlottetown Airport), WMO ID: 71706; coordinates 46°17′19″N 63°07′43″W; elevation: 48.8 m (160 ft); 1991–2020 normals, extremes 1872–present (Note: Extreme high and low temperatures in the table are from Charlottetown (April 1872 to December 1934), Charlottetown CDA (January 1935 to March 1943), and Charlottetown Airport (April 1943 to present).)
Month	Jan	Feb	Mar	Apr	May	Jun	Jul	Aug	Sep	Oct	Nov	Dec	Year
Record high humidex	16.8	14.0	26.1	25.9	34.4	39.7	40.6	41.0	39.8	32.8	26.4	19.2	41.0
Record high °C (°F)	15.1 (59.2)	13.3 (55.9)	24.5 (76.1)	26.7 (80.1)	31.7 (89.1)	32.2 (90.0)	33.9 (93.0)	36.7 (98.1)	31.5 (88.7)	27.8 (82.0)	21.3 (70.3)	16.7 (62.1)	36.7 (98.1)
Mean maximum °C (°F)	8.5 (47.3)	6.9 (44.4)	10.4 (50.7)	17.9 (64.2)	24.3 (75.7)	27.5 (81.5)	29.1 (84.4)	28.9 (84.0)	26.0 (78.8)	20.9 (69.6)	16.8 (62.2)	11.4 (52.5)	30.1 (86.2)
Mean daily maximum °C (°F)	−3.0 (26.6)	−2.9 (26.8)	1.4 (34.5)	7.3 (45.1)	14.2 (57.6)	19.5 (67.1)	23.6 (74.5)	23.3 (73.9)	19.1 (66.4)	12.6 (54.7)	6.7 (44.1)	0.9 (33.6)	10.2 (50.4)
Daily mean °C (°F)	−7.3 (18.9)	−7.3 (18.9)	−2.6 (27.3)	3.0 (37.4)	9.1 (48.4)	14.6 (58.3)	19.0 (66.2)	18.8 (65.8)	14.6 (58.3)	8.6 (47.5)	3.2 (37.8)	−2.7 (27.1)	5.9 (42.6)
Mean daily minimum °C (°F)	−11.5 (11.3)	−11.6 (11.1)	−6.5 (20.3)	−1.4 (29.5)	3.9 (39.0)	9.6 (49.3)	14.4 (57.9)	14.1 (57.4)	10.0 (50.0)	4.6 (40.3)	−0.2 (31.6)	−6.3 (20.7)	1.6 (34.9)
Mean minimum °C (°F)	−21.6 (−6.9)	−21.7 (−7.1)	−16.6 (2.1)	−7.7 (18.1)	−2.3 (27.9)	2.0 (35.6)	8.2 (46.8)	7.6 (45.7)	2.5 (36.5)	−2.1 (28.2)	−8.2 (17.2)	−16.0 (3.2)	−23.3 (−9.9)
Record low °C (°F)	−32.8 (−27.0)	−30.6 (−23.1)	−27.2 (−17.0)	−16.1 (3.0)	−6.7 (19.9)	−1.3 (29.7)	2.8 (37.0)	2.0 (35.6)	−1.4 (29.5)	−6.7 (19.9)	−17.2 (1.0)	−28.1 (−18.6)	−32.8 (−27.0)
Record low wind chill	−50.2	−45.4	−36.0	−24.5	−11.1	−3.3	0.0	0.0	−1.9	−10.8	−24.1	−40.6	−50.2
Average precipitation mm (inches)	101.4 (3.99)	85.4 (3.36)	83.9 (3.30)	74.8 (2.94)	78.3 (3.08)	90.7 (3.57)	82.3 (3.24)	96.3 (3.79)	95.3 (3.75)	121.8 (4.80)	110.3 (4.34)	115.2 (4.54)	1,135.7 (44.71)
Average rainfall mm (inches)	35.4 (1.39)	29.8 (1.17)	45.2 (1.78)	50.1 (1.97)	76.1 (3.00)	90.7 (3.57)	82.3 (3.24)	96.3 (3.79)	95.3 (3.75)	120.2 (4.73)	91.9 (3.62)	58.3 (2.30)	871.6 (34.31)
Average snowfall cm (inches)	73.2 (28.8)	61.7 (24.3)	41.9 (16.5)	21.4 (8.4)	2.2 (0.9)	0.0 (0.0)	0.0 (0.0)	0.0 (0.0)	0.0 (0.0)	1.5 (0.6)	20.5 (8.1)	62.5 (24.6)	284.8 (112.1)
Average precipitation days (≥ 0.2 mm)	19.4	15.7	16.3	14.8	13.7	12.6	13.0	11.3	12.6	15.7	16.7	19.4	181.1
Average rainy days (≥ 0.2 mm)	5.9	4.9	7.9	10.9	13.5	12.6	13.0	11.3	12.6	15.4	13.0	9.0	129.7
Average snowy days (≥ 0.2 cm)	17.7	14.1	12.6	6.2	0.7	0.0	0.0	0.0	0.0	0.1	6.4	14.7	73.4
Average relative humidity (%) (at 15:00 LST)	73.9	70.1	67.7	63.9	62.3	64.8	64.7	63.7	65.4	68.5	73.0	76.3	67.9
Average dew point °C (°F)	−10.1 (13.8)	−10.4 (13.3)	−6.6 (20.1)	−1.5 (29.3)	4.3 (39.7)	10.1 (50.2)	14.6 (58.3)	14.4 (57.9)	10.9 (51.6)	5.3 (41.5)	0.0 (32.0)	−5.3 (22.5)	2.2 (36.0)
Mean monthly sunshine hours	108.9	109.1	141.3	148.2	197.1	219.8	253.6	219.0	181.0	123.9	62.9	75.8	1,840.5
Percentage possible sunshine	38.8	37.6	38.3	36.5	42.5	46.6	53.2	49.9	47.9	36.5	22.1	28.1	39.8
Source: Environment and Climate Change Canada, (sun 1971–2000), (weatherstats.ca - average record high / low and dewp0int)

== See also ==
- List of protected areas of Prince Edward Island
- List of islands of Prince Edward Island
