= Wood Islands Provincial Park =

Park in Prince Edward Island, Canada

Coordinates: 45°57′22″N 62°44′28″W

Location of Wood Islands in PEI

Wood Islands Provincial Park is a provincial park in Prince Edward Island, Canada, situated immediately south of Wood Islands and 55 km (34 mi) from Charlottetown, the provincial capital. The park has a surface of 0.1 km^{2} (0.039 sq mi).

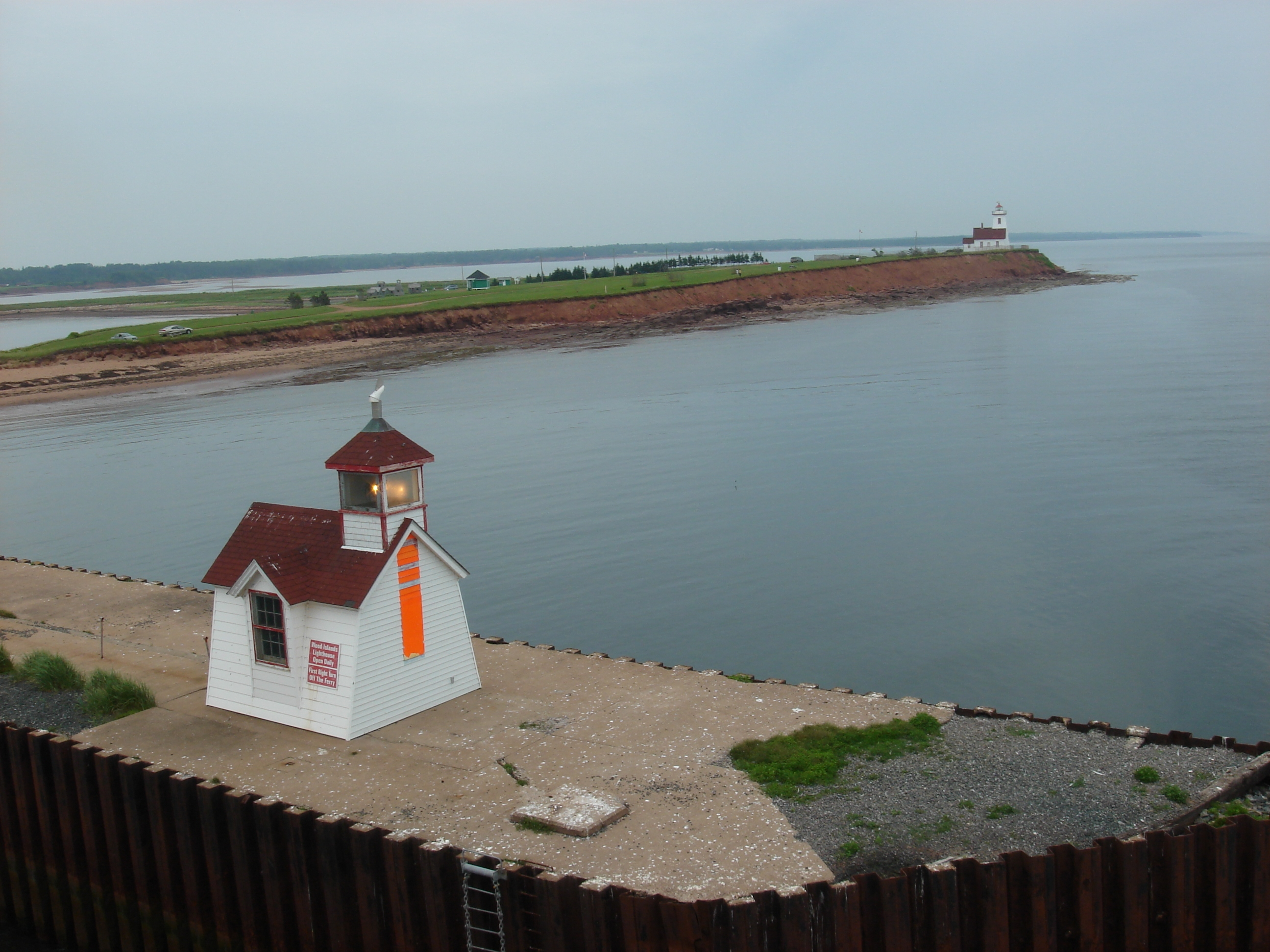
Lighthouses in Wood Islands Provincial Park

== Location ==
It is located on the south-eastern coast of the island, on a peninsula that stretches into the Northumberland Strait, beside Prince Edward Island Highway 1 and the Wood Islands Ferry Terminal in Wood Island Harbour. Northumberland Provincial Park is located 3.0 km (1.9 mi) from Wood Islands.

== Amenities ==
The park is unsupervised with rest rooms and picnic facilities, and is officially open from mid June to mid September with no access control the rest of the year. It offers a large grassy area with views of the Northumberland Strait and the Wood Islands Harbour. From May into December the two Northumberland ferries from Nova Scotia come and go, with the interval as short as 90 minutes in the summer season. The Wood Islands Lighthouse is adjacent to the park and offers tours and nautical gifts.

== See also ==
- List of parks in Prince Edward Island
