= Union Corner =

Union Corner may refer to:

- Union Corner, West Virginia
- Union Corner Provincial Park
- Union Corner, Glasgow, a building destroyed in the Union Street fire

== See also ==
- Union Corners, New York
