= Ardgowan =

Ardgowan may refer to:

- Ardgowan House, near Inverkip, Scotland
- Ardgowan, New Zealand in North Otago
- Ardgowan, Prince Edward Island, Canada, National Historic Site
