= Chelton =

Chelton may refer to:

- Chelton Beach Provincial Park, Prince Edward Island, Canada
- Chelton Flight Systems, American business corporation
- Tsilla Chelton (1919–2012), French actress
