= Linkletter, Prince Edward Island =

Linkletter
- Rural municipality
- Linkletter in Prince Edward Island
- Coordinates: 46.405°N 63.849°W
- Country: Canada
- Province: Prince Edward Island
- County: Prince
- Time zone: AST
  - Summer (DST): ADT
- Area code: 902

Linkletter is a rural municipality in Prince Edward Island, Canada. It is located immediately west of Summerside on Bedeque Bay in Prince County.

The community is named after settler George Linkletter, who arrived from Greenwich, Connecticut in 1783 after receiving a royal land grant. He and his family began Linkletter Farms in 1783, which has operated from the 1940s to the present day as a potato farm.

== Demographics ==
Federal census population history of Linkletter
Year	Pop.	±%
1981	286	—
1986	305	+6.6%
1991	289	−5.2%
1996	304	+5.2%
2001	332	+9.2%
2006	321	−3.3%
2011	320	−0.3%
2016	310	−3.1%
2021	315	+1.6%
Source: Statistics Canada

In the 2021 Census of Population conducted by Statistics Canada, Linkletter had a population of 315 living in 129 of its 137 total private dwellings, a change of 5% from its 2016 population of 300. With a land area of 7.88 km^{2} (3.04 sq mi), it had a population density of 40.0/km^{2} (103.5/sq mi) in 2021.

== See also ==
- Linkletter Provincial Park
