= Springton Peak =

Highest point on Prince Edward Island

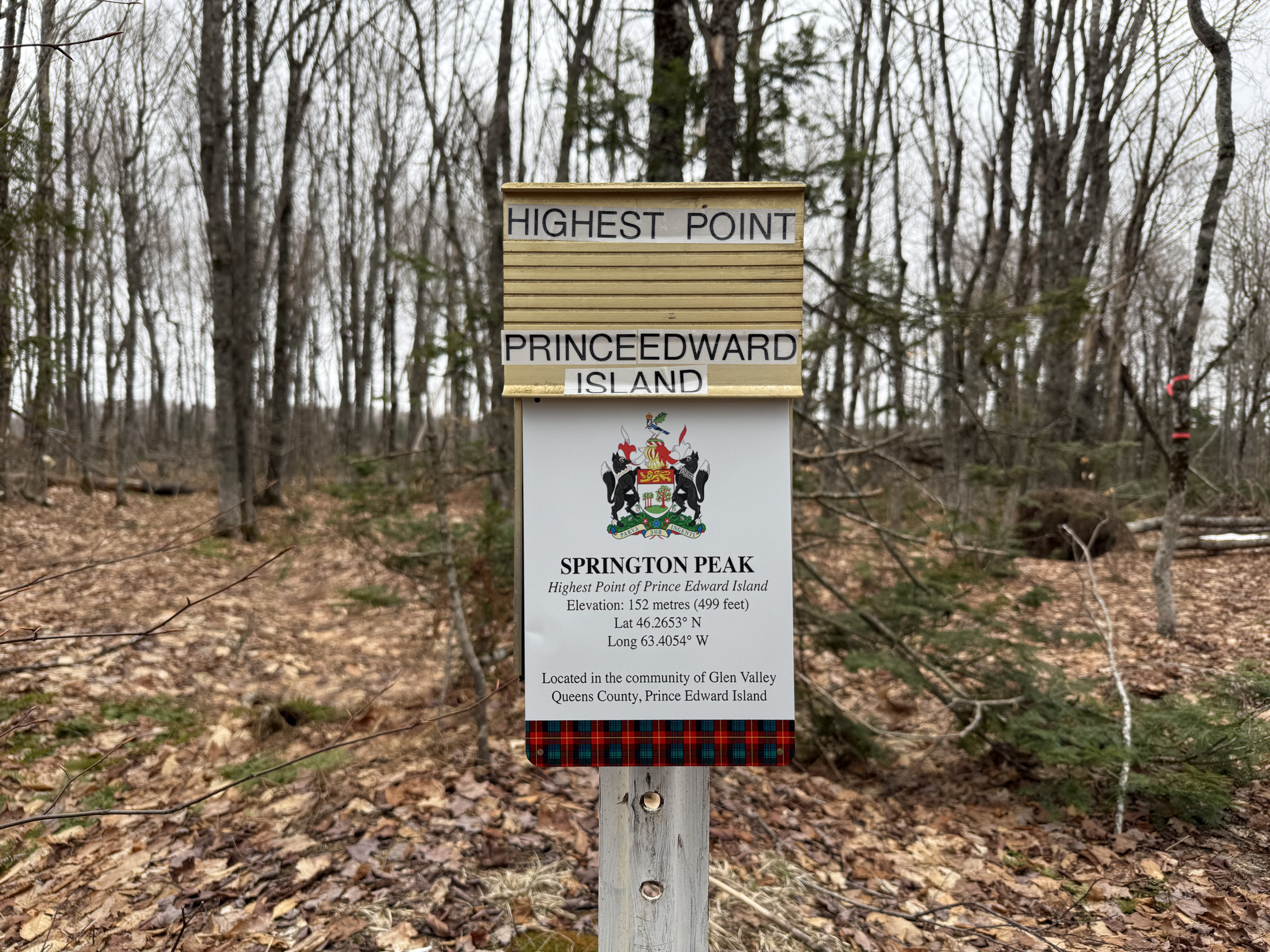
- Springton Peak plaque in 2026

Highest point
- Elevation: 138.2 m (453 ft)
- Prominence: 138.2 m (453 ft)
- Listing: Canadian Subnational High Points 13th
- Coordinates: 46°20′00″N 63°25′00″W

Geography
- Location within Prince Edward Island
- Location: Queens County, Prince Edward Island, Canada
- Parent range: Appalachian Uplands, Bonshaw Hills
- Topo map: NTS 11L5 Summerside

Climbing
- Easiest route: farm track and short trail

Springton Peak is the highest natural point in the Canadian province of Prince Edward Island, reaching roughly 138.2 m (453 ft) above sea level. It lies in central Queens County near the community of Springton, on a gentle rise along the edge of a cultivated field and a narrow band of mixed woodland north of Junction Road (Route 227). The feature carries no official name in federal databases and is commonly referred to simply as the Prince Edward Island high point, though “Springton Peak” appears in local tourism references and among provincial highpointers. Early topographic mapping showed several nearby rises of similar height; later GPS readings and localized surveys have settled on elevations in the upper 140s to near 500 ft (150 m), consistently identifying the site as the province’s highest land. Access is informal by way of an unmaintained farm track, and visitors generally remain at the field margins out of respect for private agricultural land.

== See also ==
- List of highest points of Canadian provinces and territories
- Geography of Prince Edward Island
