= Seven Wonders of Canada =

Aspect of Canadian culture and natural history

The Seven Wonders of Canada was a 2007 competition sponsored by CBC Television's The National and CBC Radio One's Sounds Like Canada. They sought to determine Canada's "seven wonders" by receiving nominations from viewers, and then from on-line voting of the short list. After the vote, a panel of judges, Ra McGuire, Roy MacGregor and Roberta L. Jamieson, picked the winners based on geographic and poetic criteria. Their seven picks were revealed on The National on June 7, 2007, making the official Seven Wonders of Canada, the Canoe, the Igloo, Niagara Falls, Old Quebec City, Pier 21 Halifax, Prairie Skies, and the Rockies. CBC anchor Peter Mansbridge commented on the top winner, “it’s hard to imagine Canada being Canada without the canoe. Explorers, missionaries, fur traders and First Nations—they’re all linked by this subtle and simple craft. To many, the quintessential Canadian experience begins by picking up a paddle. That’s why the canoe is one of the seven wonders” (Osler 2014). There were over 25,000 nominations and 1 million votes cast, according to the CBC website. The top audience votes were the Sleeping Giant, Niagara Falls, the Bay of Fundy, Nahanni National Park Reserve, the Northern Lights, the Rockies, and the Cabot Trail. The CBC website has a dedicated section for the Seven Wonders of Canada (https://www.cbc.ca/sevenwonders/index.html).

== CBC's Seven Wonders of Canada ==
Image	Nominee	Location	Province or territory	Number of votes
	The canoe			17,470
	The igloo	Northern Canada		11,082
	Niagara Falls	Niagara River	Ontario	81,818
	Old Quebec	Quebec City	Quebec	20,880
	Pier 21	Halifax	Nova Scotia	11,225
	Prairie Skies	Canadian Prairies		14,836
	The Rockies	Western Canada	Alberta and British Columbia	55,630

== Top seven in voting ==
Image	Nominee	Location	Province or territory	Number of votes
	Sleeping Giant	Thunder Bay	Ontario	177,305
	Niagara Falls	Niagara River	Ontario	81,818
	Bay of Fundy	Atlantic Canada	New Brunswick and Nova Scotia	67,670
	Nahanni National Park Reserve	Northern Canada	Northwest Territories	64,920
	Northern Lights	Northern Canada		61,417
	The Rockies	Western Canada	Alberta and British Columbia	55,630
	Cabot Trail	Cape Breton Island	Nova Scotia	44,073

Full voting results

== Short list ==
Image	Nominee	Location	Province or territory	Number of votes
	Cathedral Grove	MacMillan Provincial Park	British Columbia	21,472
	CN Tower	Toronto	Ontario	26,740
	Confederation Bridge	Northumberland Strait	Prince Edward Island and New Brunswick	27,791
	Crooked Trees	Thickwood Hills	Saskatchewan	6,843
	Cypress Hills	Cypress Hills Interprovincial Park	Saskatchewan and Alberta	10,535
	Dawson City		Yukon	4,846
	Dempster Highway	Northern Canada	Yukon and Northwest Territories	4,538
	Drumheller	Red Deer River	Alberta	31,828
	Grand Beach	Lake Winnipeg	Manitoba	6,182
	Gros Morne National Park	Western Newfoundland	Newfoundland and Labrador	41,034
	Haida Gwaii – Queen Charlotte Islands	Northwest British Columbia	British Columbia	14,501
	Hartland Covered Bridge	Hartland	New Brunswick	11,390
	Ice Roads	Northern Canada		14,650
	L'Anse Amour – Village of Seven	Labrador	Newfoundland and Labrador	12,111
	Library of Parliament	Ottawa	Ontario	7,411
	Manicouagan Reservoir	Northern Quebec	Quebec	5,550
	Manitoba Legislative Building	Winnipeg	Manitoba	3,650
	Manitoulin Island	Lake Huron	Ontario	25,775
	The Montreal bagel	Montreal	Quebec	3,981
	Mount Thor	Auyuittuq National Park	Nunavut	5,750
	Mum's House	Toronto	Ontario	3,383
	Museum of Civilization	Gatineau	Quebec	15,015
	Narcisse Snake Dens	Narcisse	Manitoba	5,407
	Nonosabasut Rock	Grand Falls-Windsor	Newfoundland & Labrador	8,563
	Northwest Passage	Arctic Canada		10,117
	Number 5 Road	Richmond	British Columbia	2,343
	Percé Rock	Gaspé	Quebec	10,417
	Porcupine Caribou Herd	Northern Canada		8,001
	Rankin Inlet Inukshuk	Rankin Inlet	Nunavut	7,531
	Rideau Canal	Eastern Ontario	Ontario	12,163
	Saguenay Fjord	Laurentian Highlands	Quebec	7,590
	Saugeen Shores sunsets	Saugeen Shores	Ontario	7,493
	Singing Sands Beach	Basin Head	Prince Edward Island	8,232
	Spiral Tunnels	Canadian Rockies	British Columbia	8,755
	The Stanley Cup			19,581
	Trans-Canada Highway			14,753
	Tuktoyaktuk Pingos	Tuktoyaktuk	Northwest Territories	5,987
	Vegreville egg	Vegreville	Alberta	5,444
	Vimy Memorial	Canada, France		15,462
	Wreck Beach	Pacific Spirit Regional Park	British Columbia	7,143

== See also ==
- Wonders of the World (disambiguation)
- Wonders of the World
