= MacMillan Provincial Park =

Park in British Columbia, Canada

- IUCN category III (natural monument or feature)
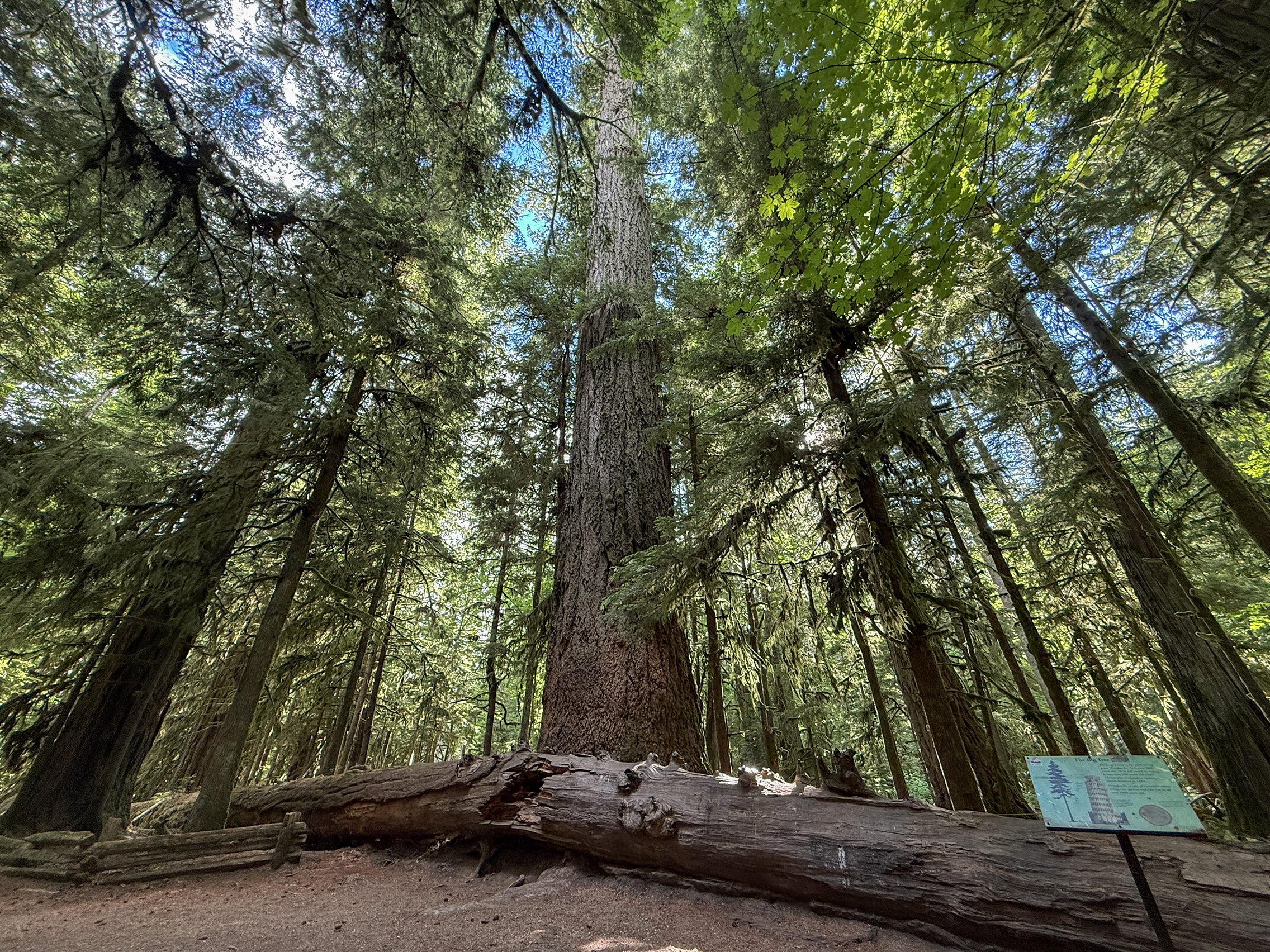
- Large Douglas fir at Cathedral Grove

- Location within Vancouver Island Location within British Columbia
- Interactive map of MacMillan Provincial Park
- Location: Vancouver Island, British Columbia, Canada
- Nearest city: Port Alberni
- Coordinates: 49°17′24″N 124°39′41″W
- Designation: Provincial Park
- Created: 1947
- Visitors: 543,735 (in 2017-18)
- Governing body: BC Parks
- Website: bcparks.ca/macmillan-park/

MacMillan Provincial Park is a 301-hectare (740-acre) provincial park in British Columbia, Canada. Located 25 km (16 mi) west of Qualicum Beach and 16 km (9.9 mi) east of Port Alberni, the park straddles Highway 4 and the Island Rail Corridor in central Vancouver Island. It is nestled on the western shore of Cameron Lake, and protects the delta of the Cameron River. The park is home to a famous, 157-hectare (390-acre) stand of ancient Douglas fir, known as Cathedral Grove, which draws visitors from all over the world. The park provides the only highway-accessible protected old-growth Douglas-fir forest in British Columbia. In 2007 Cathedral Grove made the short list on CBC's competition Seven Wonders of Canada.

== Flora and fauna ==
The forests in the park are transitional between the drier Coastal Douglas-fir Biogeoclimatic Zone (CDF), which characterizes the east coast of Vancouver Island, and the wetter Coastal Western Hemlock Biogeoclimatic Zone (CWH), found along the island's west coast. Some of the trees are more than 800 years old and 9 metres (30 ft) in circumference. The flora of the park is typical of the region, and includes stands of old-growth tree species including western redcedar and bigleaf maple (found south of the highway), western hemlock, and grand fir.

The understory (term for the area of the forest that grows in the shade the forest canopy) includes red huckleberry, salal, and devil's club. The park is home to several species of birds, including owls and woodpeckers; as well as such mammals as deer, black bear, elk and cougar. The Cameron River and Cameron Lake are stocked with rainbow, brown, and cutthroat trout.

== History ==
Indigenous peoples are believed to have used the area for ceremonial purposes prior to the arrival of European settlers in the mid-19th century. Evidence of "culturally modified trees", western redcedar trees which have had their bark stripped off, have been found and dated as far back as AD 1137.

The name "Cathedral Grove" is reputed to have originated from the Governor General of Canada, the Viscount Willingdon, in 1928, and appeared in correspondence to the provincial government in the 1920s. Cathedral Grove was a well-known tourist stop in the 1920s and 1930s, long before its protection. Over the following quarter century the public pressured and petitioned the provincial government to acquire the lands known as Cathedral Grove, and for the property and timber owners to donate the land. H.R. MacMillan, who had served as first chief forester of British Columbia and became a well-known forester and logging industrialist as head of the H.R. MacMillan Export Company (later MacMillan Bloedel), after years of refusing to consider the public demands, in 1944 donated the 136 hectares of his company's timber holdings "for the perpetual enjoyment of the public in recognition of the unique stand of trees". In 1947 the area was established as a Class A provincial park.

Logging of the remainder of the valley upstream of the park throughout the late 20th century resulted in significant damage to the forest adjacent to the Cameron River. Extreme runoff from a 1990 tropical storm resulted in extensive flooding and streambank erosion, and 6 hectares of tree blowdown. In 1997 high winds caused extensive damage to the grove and surrounding forest. In the 1990s BC Parks initiated a trail rehabilitation program to prevent further damage from park visitation. The grove suffered more storm damage in December 2018 and November 2024.

=== Parking lot controversy ===
Visitor parking has traditionally been along both sides of the narrow highway just west of the Cameron River bridge, a condition that by the 1990s was judged to be dangerous for tour buses, cars, and loaded logging trucks.

== Gallery ==
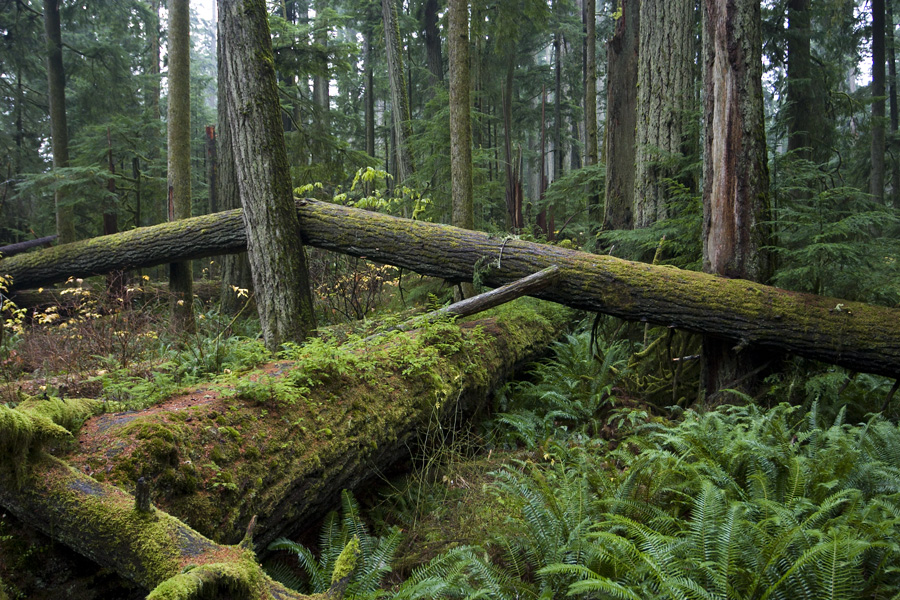
Cathedral Grove in 2006

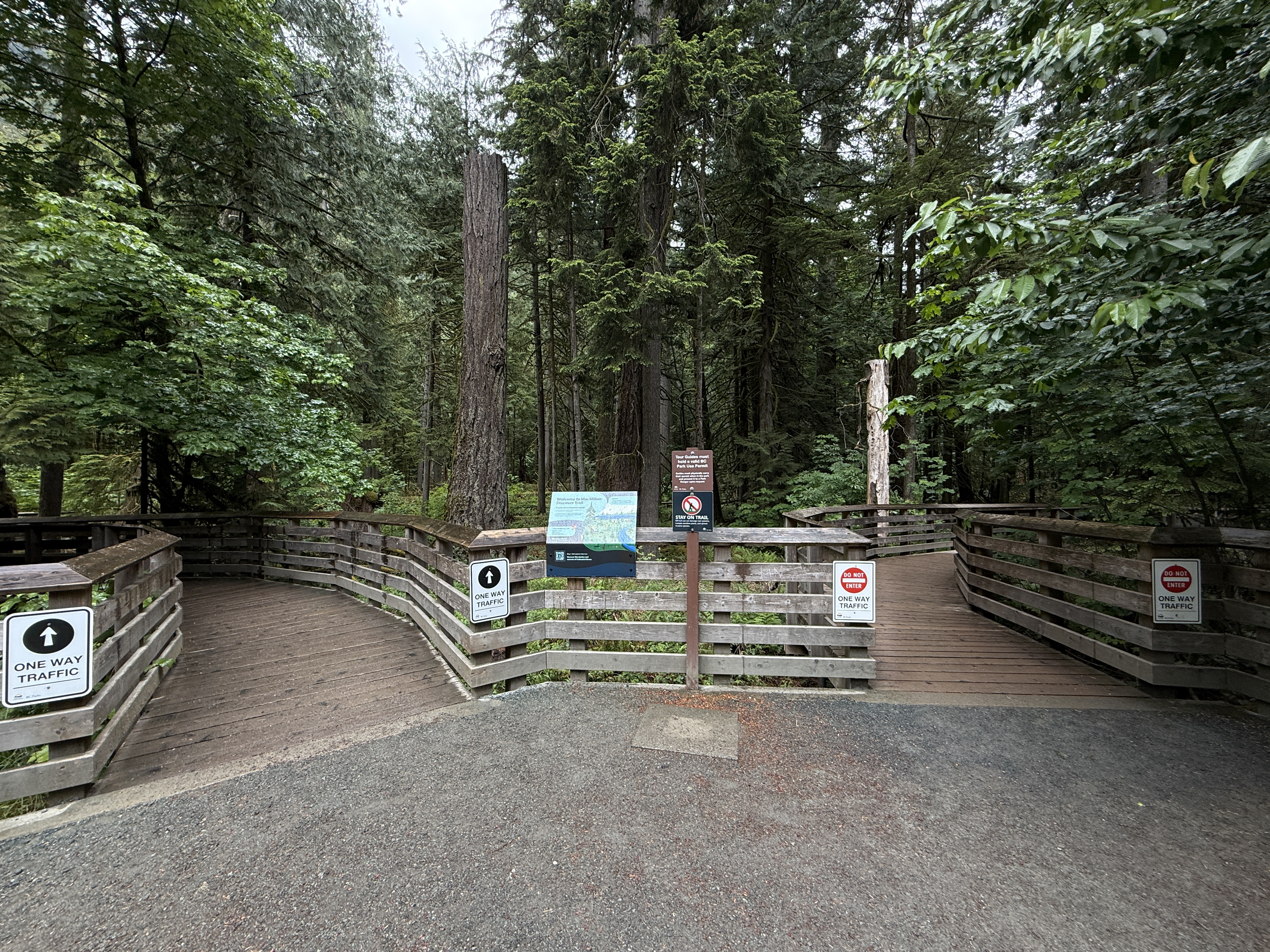
Cathedral Grove Old growth trail entrance

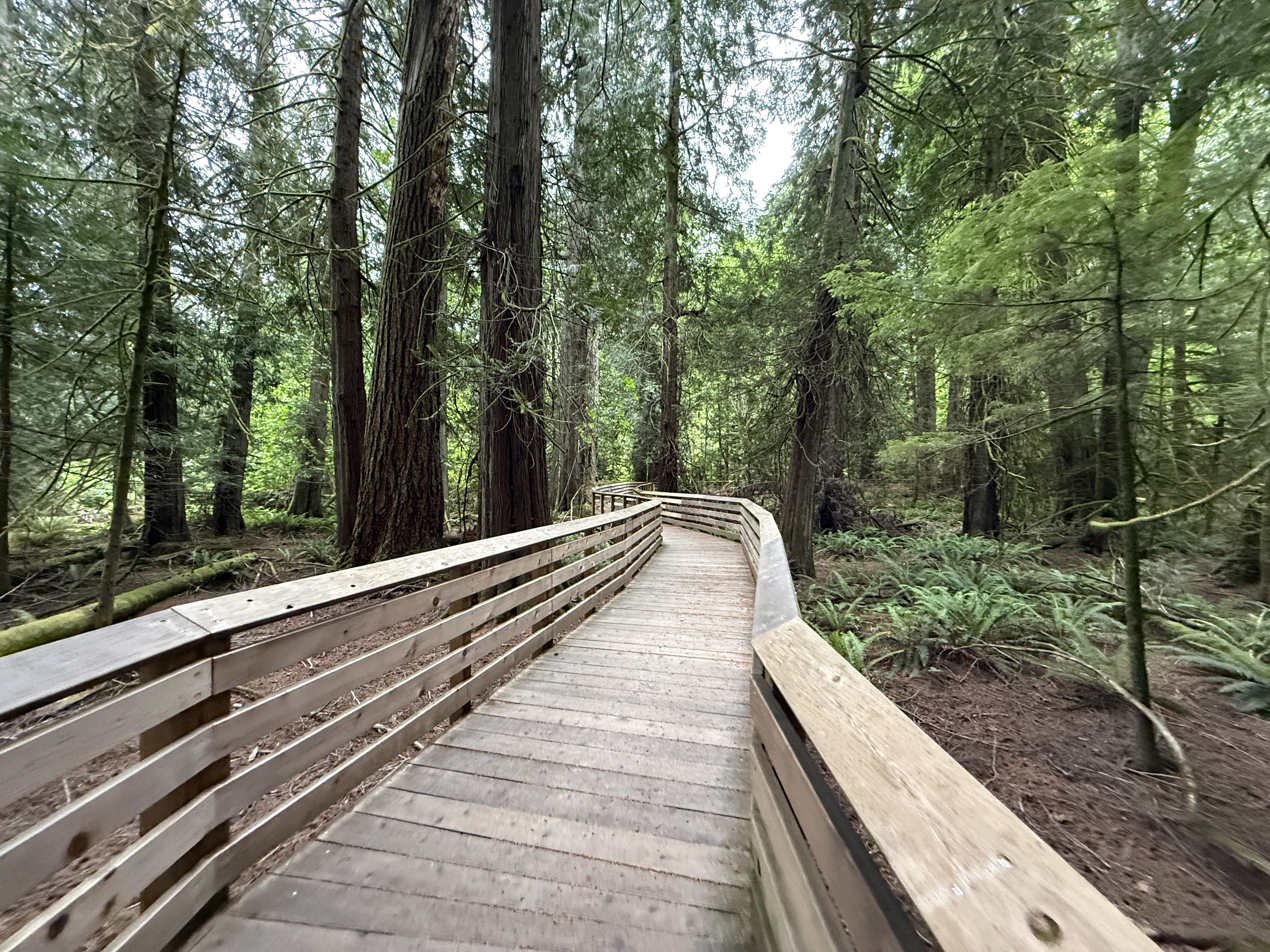
Cathedral Grove Old growth trail

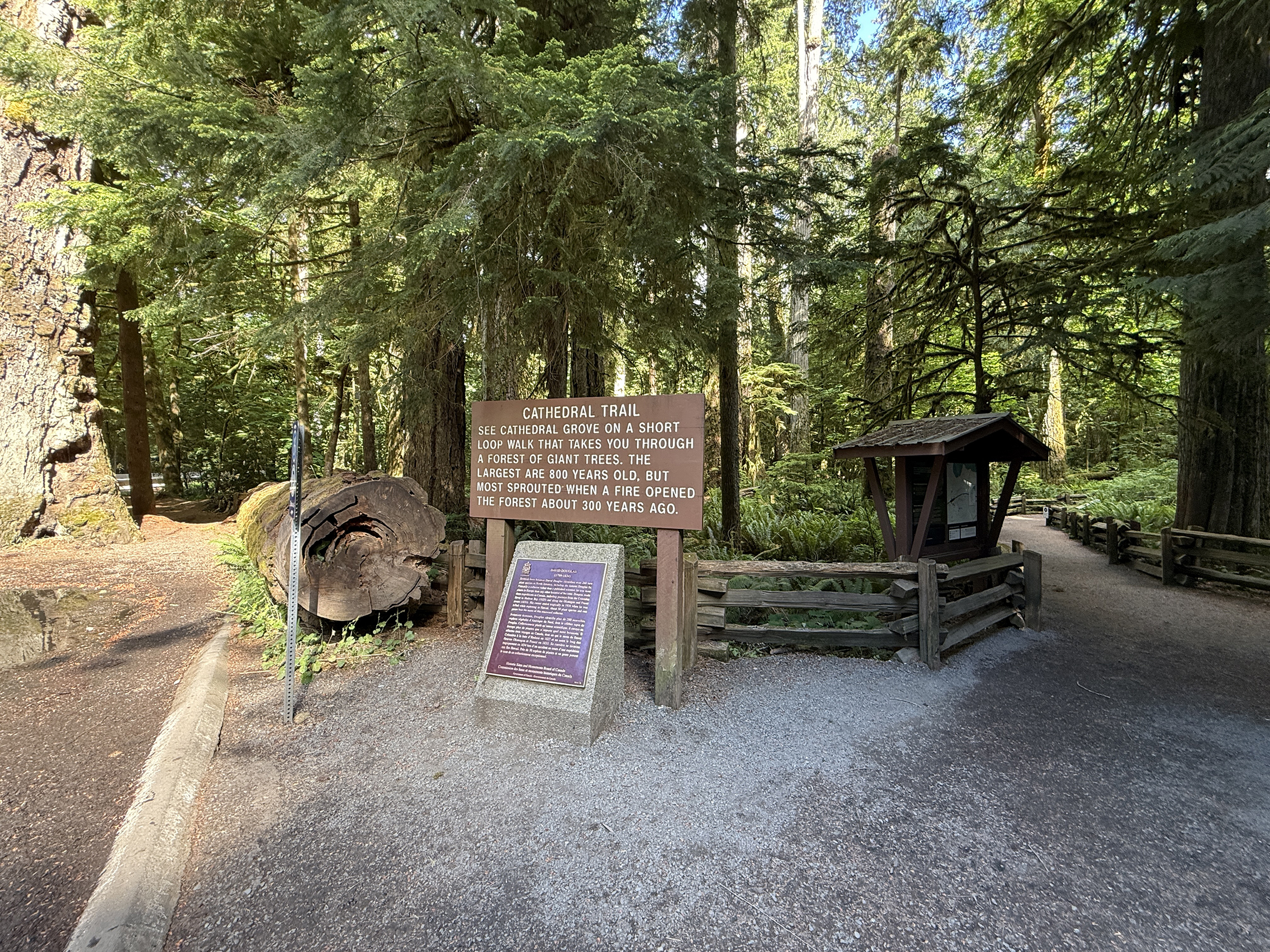
Living Forest Trail entrance

== See also ==
- Mount Arrowsmith Biosphere Region
