= Strathgartney Provincial Park =

Park in Prince Edward Island, Canada

Coordinates: 46°16′43.8″N 63°37′25.2″W

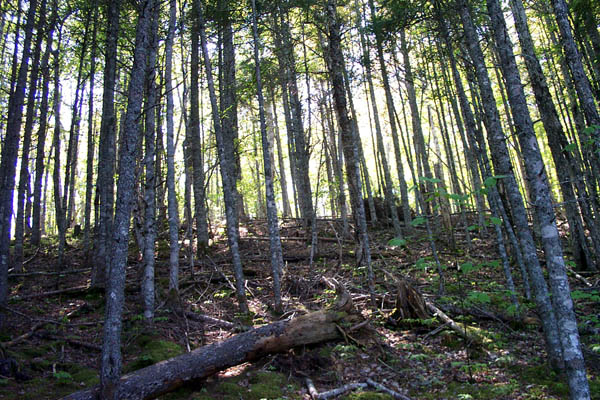
A trail in Strathgartney Park

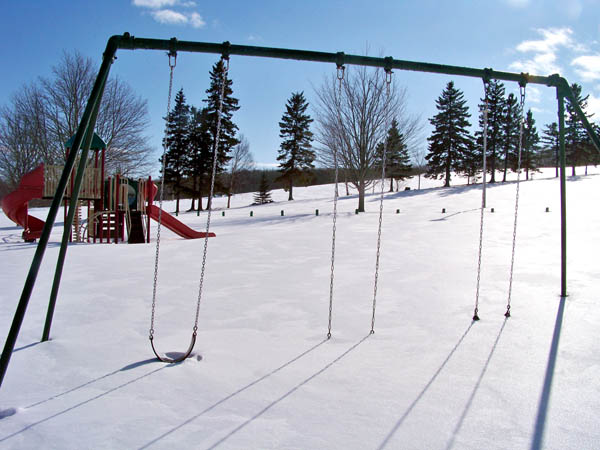
Playground in winter at Strathgartney Provincial Park

Strathgartney Provincial Park is a provincial park in Prince Edward Island, Canada. Its trails connect it to Bonshaw Provincial Park. In June 2021, it was announced that a portion of the parked will be leased privately and turned into luxury campgrounds.
