= Red Point Provincial Park =

Park in Prince Edward Island, Canada

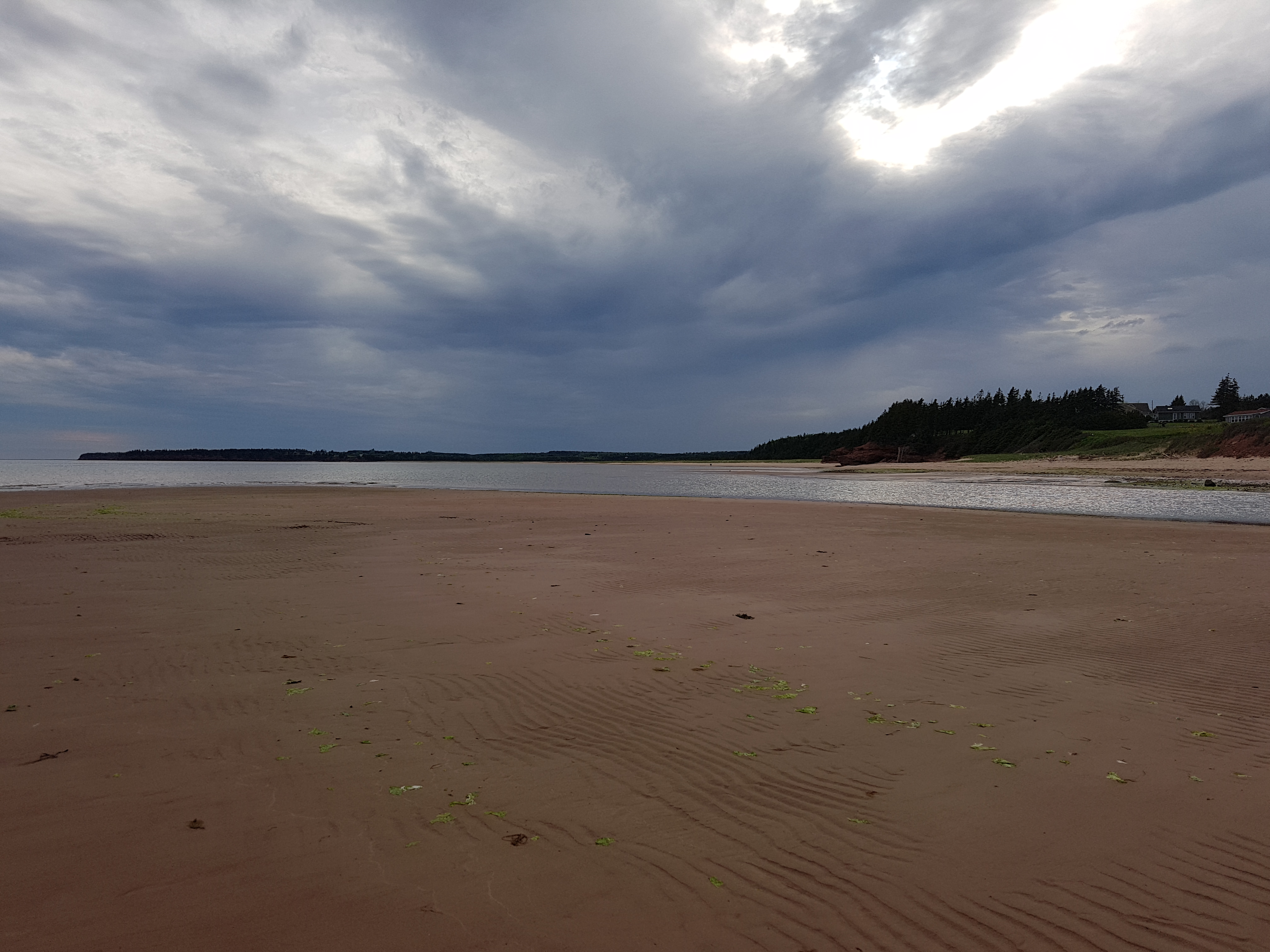

- Location within Prince Edward Island
- Type: Park
- Location: Red Point, Prince Edward Island
- Nearest city: Souris
- Coordinates: 46°22′N 62°8′W

Red Point Provincial Park is a provincial park in Prince Edward Island, Canada. It is near the town of Souris and Basin Head Provincial Park.
