= Pinette Park Provincial Park =

Provincial park in Prince Edward Island, Canada

Coordinates: 46°3′32.8″N 62°53′57.8″W

Pinette Park Provincial Park is a provincial park in Prince Edward Island, Canada located along the Pinette River.
