= Bali Peace Park =

The Bali Peace Park is a proposed memorial dedicated to the victims of the Bali bombing, intended to be located at the site of the Sari Club, which was the second target of the attack.

== History ==
In 2009, an unauthorized commercial development by Balinese businessman Kadek Wirinatha was stopped by Balinese government officials, leading to a meeting between the Australian Consulate and the Governor. Following this meeting, the Governor and the Regent of Badung reaffirmed their support for the development of the Peace Park at the Sari Club site, stating that no other building permits, including for a planned nightclub, would be granted.

In December 2009, the Bali Peace Park Association was granted Deductible Gift Recipient (DGR) status by the Australian Federal Government, allowing for tax-deductible donations.

In March 2010, the Bali Peace Park Project was included in Australian Prime Minister Kevin Rudd's foreign affairs brief for his meeting with Indonesian President Susilo Bambang Yudhoyono in Canberra. During this time, representatives from the Bali Peace Park Association also met with Governor Made Mangku Pastika, who was accompanying the Indonesian president, to provide an updated report on the project's progress.

In 2019, Australian Prime Minister Scott Morrison committed to funding the purchase of the Sari Club site, contingent on a commercial agreement between the Bali Peace Park Association and the landowners. The landowners declined the Association's offer and made a counteroffer, which the Association subsequently declined. As a result, the Association ceased its interest in the land. The landowners then extended the same offer to Dallas Finn, who had been expelled from the Peace Park Association and formed his own organization, the Bali Peace Park Project. Finn was unable to secure the funds to purchase the land at the proposed price. Consequently, the Sari Club site remained a vacant lot.

In 2022, a deal was made to secure land for the Peace Park for $4.4 million.
