= Bedeque Bay =

Bay in Prince Edward Island, Canada

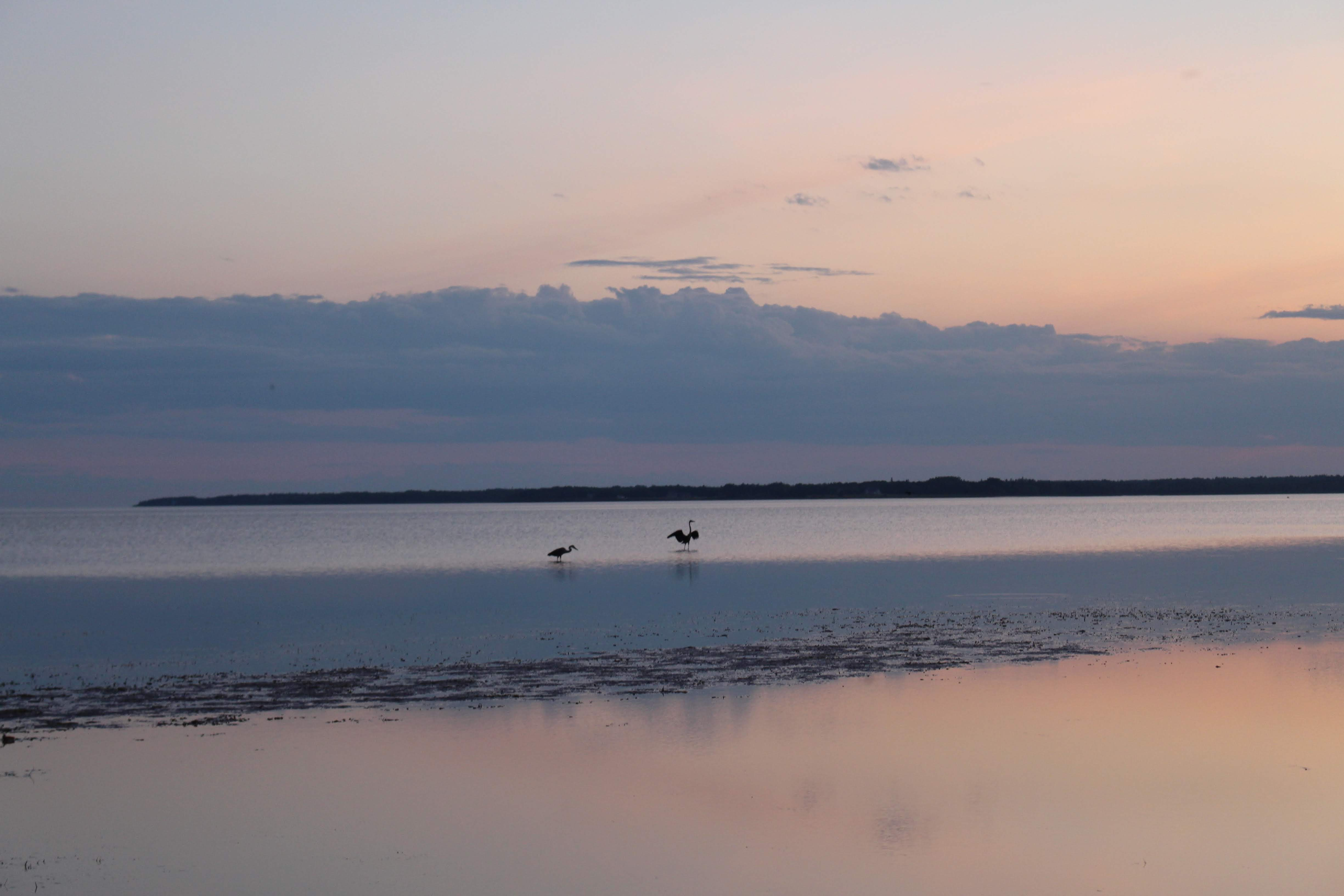
- Bedeque Bay viewed from Linkletter Provincial Park

- Location within Prince Edward Island
- Coordinates: 46°22′N 63°53′W
- Primary inflows: Bradshaw River, Dunk River, Wilmot River
- Primary outflows: Northumberland Strait
- Basin countries: Canada
- Islands: Holman Island

Bedeque Bay (/bəˈdɛk/, bə-DEK) is a bay of Northumberland Strait on the south side of Prince Edward Island, Canada. Summerside, Prince Edward Island's second-largest city, is located at the head of the bay.

== Name ==
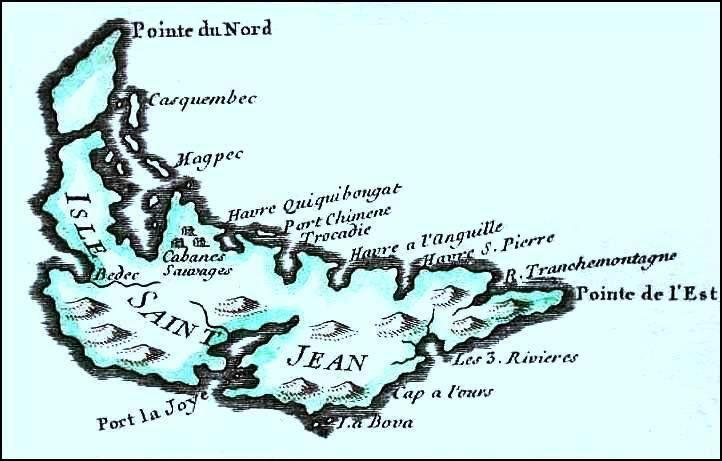
Inset of Bellin's 1744 map of Acadia depicting the place name Bedec (middle left).

Jacques-Nicolas Bellin first recorded the place name Bedec in his 1744 maps of New France and Acadia. William Francis Ganong noted the correspondence between this place name and Baddeck, Nova Scotia, and concluded that they likely both derive from a Miꞌkmaq term meaning "the place that lies on a backward turn". This referred to how the Miꞌkmaq would typically enter Summerside Harbour after accessing Bedeque Bay from the east (see History below). Previously, Silas Tertius Rand had proposed that these place names derive from the Mi'kmaq word ebedek or eptek meaning "the hot place".

== Geography ==
Bedeque Bay is located on the south shore of west-central Prince Edward Island. It extends from Seacow Head in the east, where Seacow Head Light is located, to Cape Egmont according to the official definition. Others define it to extend only as far as Little Dutchman Rock off Union Corner. The bay is broad and shallow with depths not exceeding 10 metres (33 ft). Three significant embayments are Sunbury Cove in the northwest, featuring extensive tidal flats; Summerside Harbour to the northeast, where the city of Summerside and the mouth of the Dunk and Wilmot estuaries are located; and Salutation Cove on the bay's east side.

The only significant island in the bay is Holman Island in Summerside Harbour, which covers 37 hectares (91 acres). Thickly forested and uninhabited, it was purchased by the Nature Conservancy of Canada in 2016.

Bedeque Bay drains a watershed of 367.4 square kilometres (141.9 sq mi). The main rivers flowing into Bedeque Bay are Dunk River and Wilmot River, whose drainage areas cover 213.3 square kilometres (82.4 sq mi) and 83.76 square kilometres (32.34 sq mi) respectively. In 2022, the water quality of each river's watershed was rated as "poor" and "fair" respectively, with high nitrate concentrations and frequent occurrences of sediment-laden runoff being observed in both watersheds.

The prevailing winds are out of the southwest from May to September, out of the west from October to March, and out of the north from March to April. The mean tidal range is 1.5 metres (4 ft 11 in). The bay's shore usually starts to freeze after mid-December and remains frozen through the end of March.

== Wildlife ==
=== Plants and seaweed ===
Beds of Zostera marina eelgrass are found in the bay. It has been estimated that in the Dunk River estuary, the extent of eelgrass coverage may have halved between 1967 and 2014. Irish moss is found on the east side of the bay and in Salutation Cove. Sea lettuce grows in the Wilmot River, where it can hinder the harvesting of oysters. The invasive oyster thief (Codium fragile) is present in Sunbury Cove.

=== Invertebrates ===
Bedeque Bay is well known for its commercially harvested Eastern oysters (see Oyster fishery below), while high concentrations of soft-shell clams and Atlantic surf clams are also found in the bay. The common starfish preys on oyster spat, and the tube worm Polydora websteri grows on oysters but tends not to bore holes into them. Aquatic invasive species documented in Bedeque Bay include green crab throughout the bay, golden star tunicate and violet tunicate in Summerside Harbour, and oyster drill in the Dunk River estuary.

=== Fish ===
Over ten species of fish have been documented in Bedeque Bay, including Atlantic salmon, rainbow smelt, gaspereau, American eel, striped bass, three-spined stickleback, Atlantic cod, mummichog, and non-native rainbow trout and brook trout. In the summer, Bedeque Bay is a feeding ground for Atlantic mackerel, Atlantic herring, juvenile Atlantic cod, white hake, and winter flounder. The Dunk and Wilmot are among the few rivers in central Prince Edward Island that still have a native salmon population. Fish kills have been documented in the Bradshaw (1967), Wilmot (twice in 2002), and Dunk rivers (1968, 1975, 1977, 2004 and 2007).

=== Birds and mammals ===
Bedeque Bay is designated an Important Bird Area. It is a staging ground for migratory waterfowl including Canada geese and Atlantic brant. A variety of shorebirds also frequent the mudflats around the bay in late summer and early fall. Species found at Holman Island include the great blue heron, belted kingfisher, and red knot.

Grey seals, harbour seals, and harp seals have been observed in Bedeque Bay.

== Economic activity ==
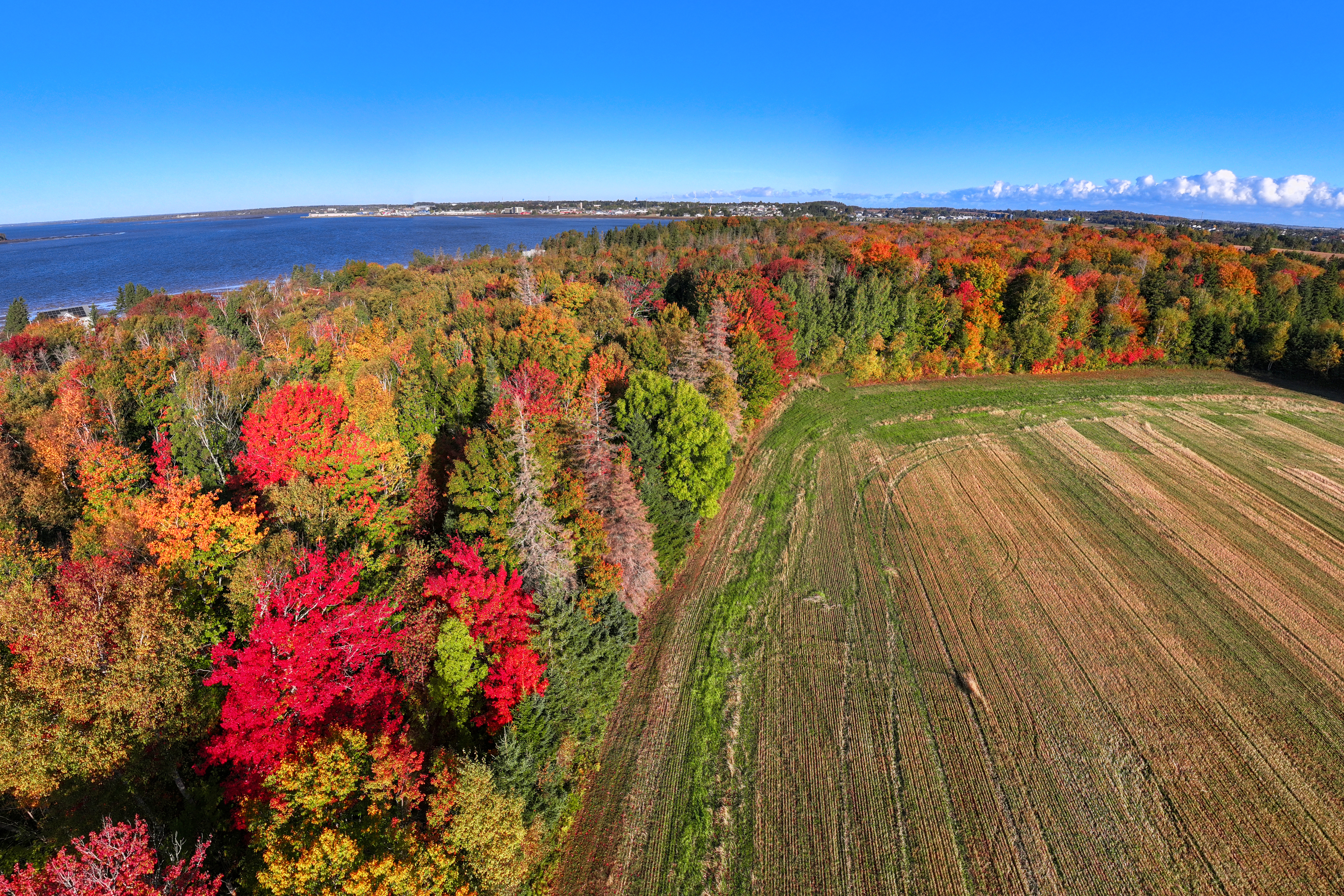
Aerial view of autumn foliage bordering a field with Summerside Harbour in the background.

=== Agriculture ===
The Bedeque Bay watershed is one of the most agriculturally intensive watersheds in the province, with almost 75% of it cleared. Much of this land is planted in three-year rotation mandated by the province's Agriculture Crop Rotation Act, whereby the main cash crop of potatoes is rotated with cereals and forages.

=== Oyster fishery ===
Until recently, over 65% of Prince Edward Island's oysters were sourced from the Dunk and Wilmot estuaries. MSX, a disease that can cause up to 95% mortality in oyster populations, was detected in June 2024 in oysters collected in Bedeque Bay. Dermo, another lethal oyster pathogen, was detected in nearby Egmont Bay in 2025. These were the first instances of either disease being detected in Prince Edward Island. Mass mortality of oysters was observed in Bedeque Bay in April 2025.

== History ==
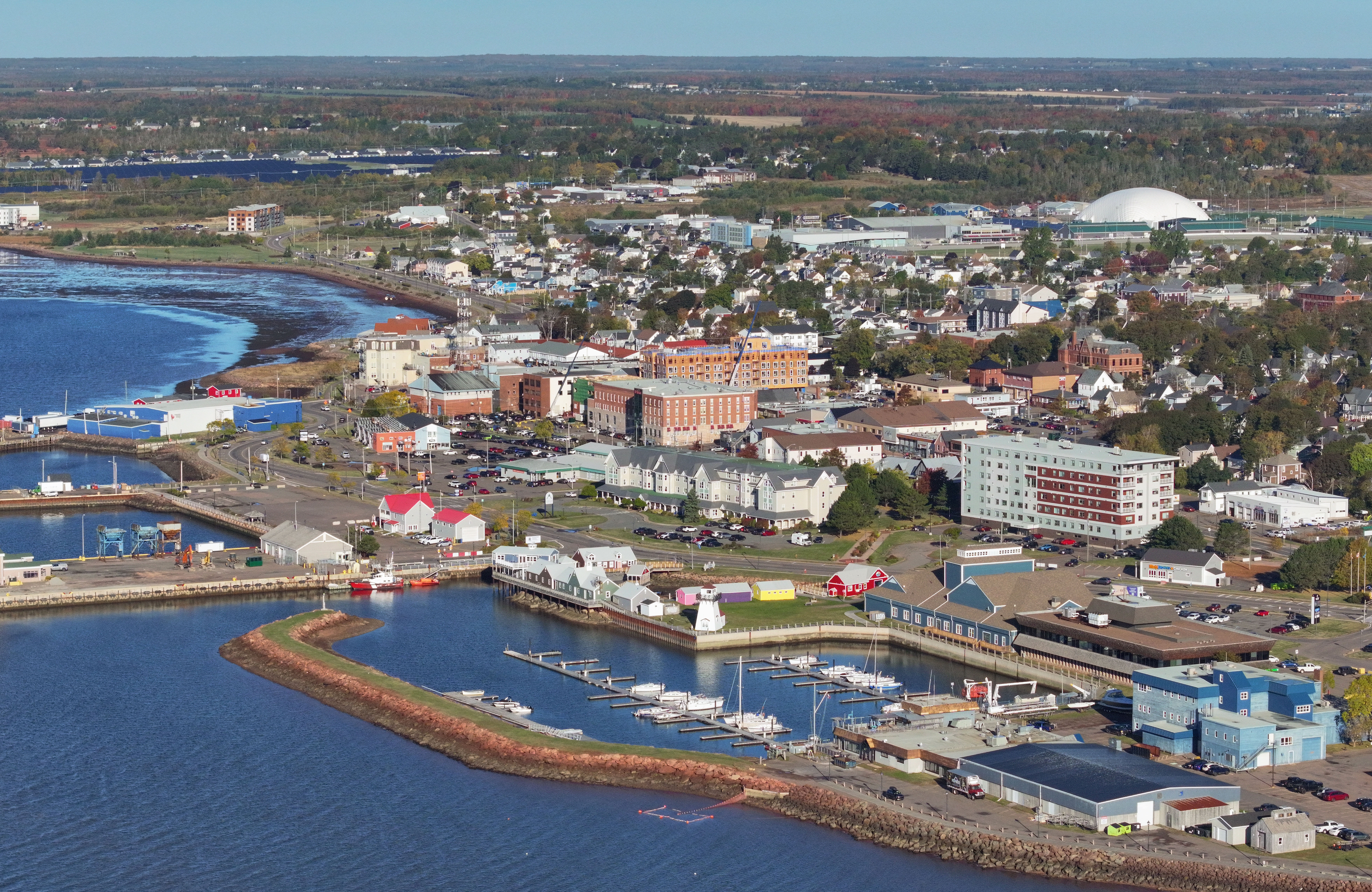
Summerside, Prince Edward Island's second-largest city, lies at the head of Bedeque Bay.

Bedeque Bay lies on a canoe route used by the Mi'kmaq to travel between the mainland and the north shore of Prince Edward Island. The route led from Cape Tormentine across the Abegweit Passage into Bedeque Bay and Wilmot River, followed by a portage via Reads Creek and Rayners Creek to Webber Cove on Malpeque Bay.

The first Acadian settlers arrived in the area of Bedeque in 1750, but were expelled by the British in the 1758 Île Saint-Jean campaign. Bedeque was resettled by Loyalist refugees in 1784. Summerside became prominent as a shipbuilding centre in the 1860s, leading to its incorporation as a town in 1877. After the collapse of the shipbuilding industry at the end of the 19th century, the mainstay of the local economy reverted to farming.

In 1847, Abraham Pineo Gesner reported that fine oysters were produced at the mouth of the Dunk River. By 1878, oysters had become scarce in the bay. From 1915 through the 1930s, oyster stocks throughout Prince Edward Island were destroyed by an unidentified pathogen dubbed Malpeque Disease, although it is unclear whether Bedeque Bay was specifically affected, and production there had resumed by 1937. When Malpeque disease devastated oyster stocks in New Brunswick and Nova Scotia in the late 1950s, oysters from Bedeque Bay were transplanted to those provinces to enable a quicker recovery.

In 1975, the Dunk and Wilmot estuaries accounted for half of Prince Edward Island's oyster production. Around the same time, it became apparent that silting caused by the intensive cultivation of potatoes in the Dunk River watershed was having detrimental effects on fish and oysters in the river. The Bedeque Bay Environmental Management Association was established in 1992 through Environment Canada's Atlantic Coastal Action Program. It is a community-led nonprofit organization with a mandate to address environmental issues in the Bedeque Bay watershed.
