= Linkletter Provincial Park =

Provincial park in Prince Edward Island, Canada

Coordinates: 46°24′9.7″N 63°51′1.3″W

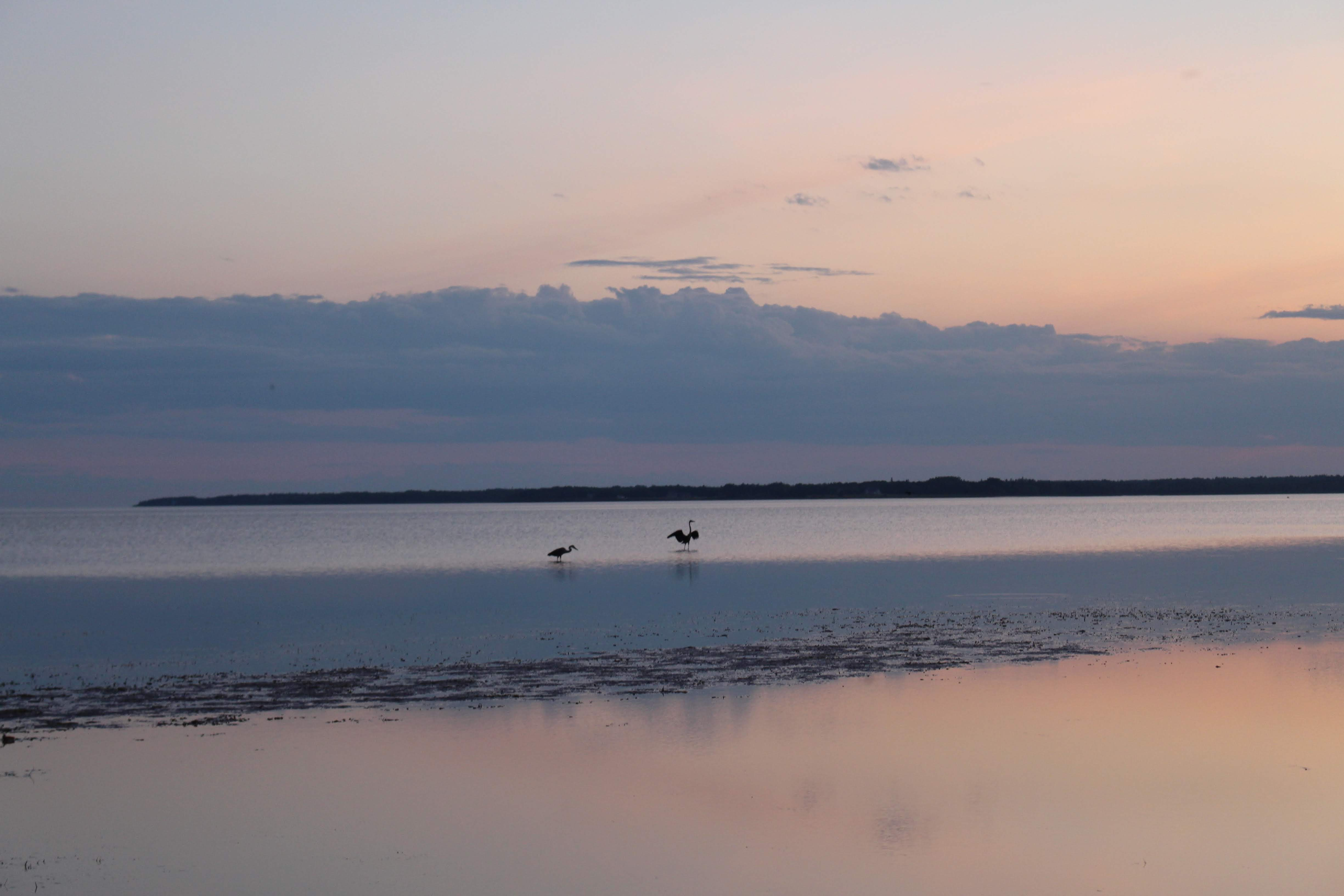
Some birds cooling off in the Atlantic Ocean during sunset off the coast in Linkletter Provincial Park

Linkletter Provincial Park is a provincial park in Prince Edward Island, Canada located at Bedeque Bay a short distance west of Linkletter, Prince Edward Island and Summerside, Prince Edward Island.

The park has 51 camp sites for reservation from early June to September. Some camp sites are situated along the shore and a small beach is located at the park.

The park is named for nearby Linkletter, Prince Edward Island, which was named for settler George Linkletter.
