= Basin Head, Prince Edward Island =

Coordinates: 46°22′40″N 62°06′33″W

Location of Basin Head in PEI

Basin Head is a cape in Lot 47, Kings County, Prince Edward Island, Canada.

Extending into the Northumberland Strait, its geographic coordinates are 46'23"N, 62'07"W.

Basin Head is home to Basin Head Provincial Park, which hosts a fisheries museum and a popular beach, Singing Sands Beach, which was on the short list but was not named one of the Seven Wonders of Canada.

The white (silica) sand on the coast between Basin Head and East Point is geologically unique in the province.
