= Kings Castle Provincial Park =

Provincial park in Prince Edward Island, Canada

Coordinates: 46.02304°N 62.56173°W

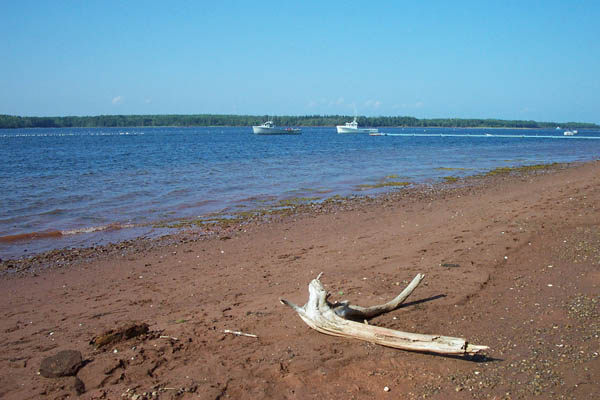
Driftwood on the beach at Kings Castle Provincial Park

Kings Castle Provincial Park is a provincial park in the southeastern portion of Prince Edward Island, Canada.
