= Chelton Beach Provincial Park =

Provincial park in Prince Edward Island, Canada

Coordinates: 46°18′14.2″N 63°44′49.8″W

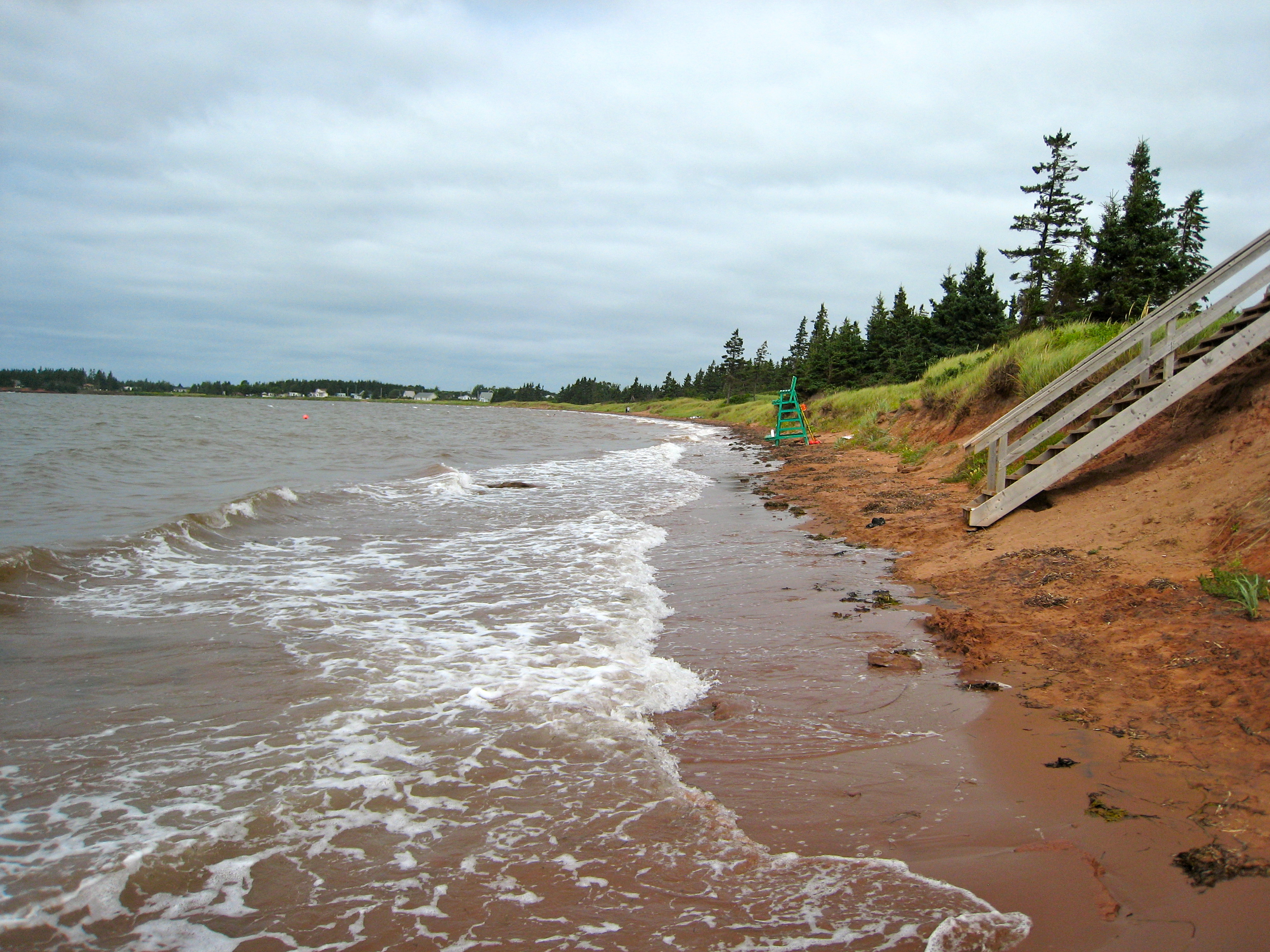
- Chelton Beach at high tide
- Interactive map of Chelton Beach Provincial Park
- Type: Provincial (Government of Prince Edward Island)
- Location: Chelton
- Created: 1960s
- Operator: Government of Prince Edward Island
- Visitors: 500+ annually
- Open: From June 13th to September 14th

Chelton Beach Provincial Park is a provincial park in Prince Edward Island, Canada.

Located on the once farm of Louis Pearson of the aforementioned province, Chelton Beach is the chief tourism center of the community of Chelton. The surrounding area is heavily populated with cottages of which most, if not all, are for seasonal use only. It is located approximately 15 minutes by car from the Confederation Bridge though quite far from any other metropolitan center. Despite this the beach is relatively well used, filling beyond its official boundaries on most warm days. As is usual in the region of the Seven Mile Bay, the region to which Chelton belongs, at low tide the beach's surface area increases notably due to the great amount of sand bars. The park itself is composed of two buildings, a shower/restroom facility and a canteen where fast-foods can be purchased. Until the early 2000s there was a large wooden jungle gym, a merry-go-round, a swing set, a see-saw, and a large slide, all dating from, at least, the 1970s. These structures were gradually torn down after being deemed unsafe by the province. The swing set and slide were replaced shortly after their predecessor's demolition.
