= Ardgowan, Prince Edward Island =

National Historic Site of Canada

Coordinates: 46°15′7.13″N 63°7′34.62″W

Ardgowan is a National Historic Site of Canada located in Parkdale, Prince Edward Island, currently a neighbourhood of the city of Charlottetown.

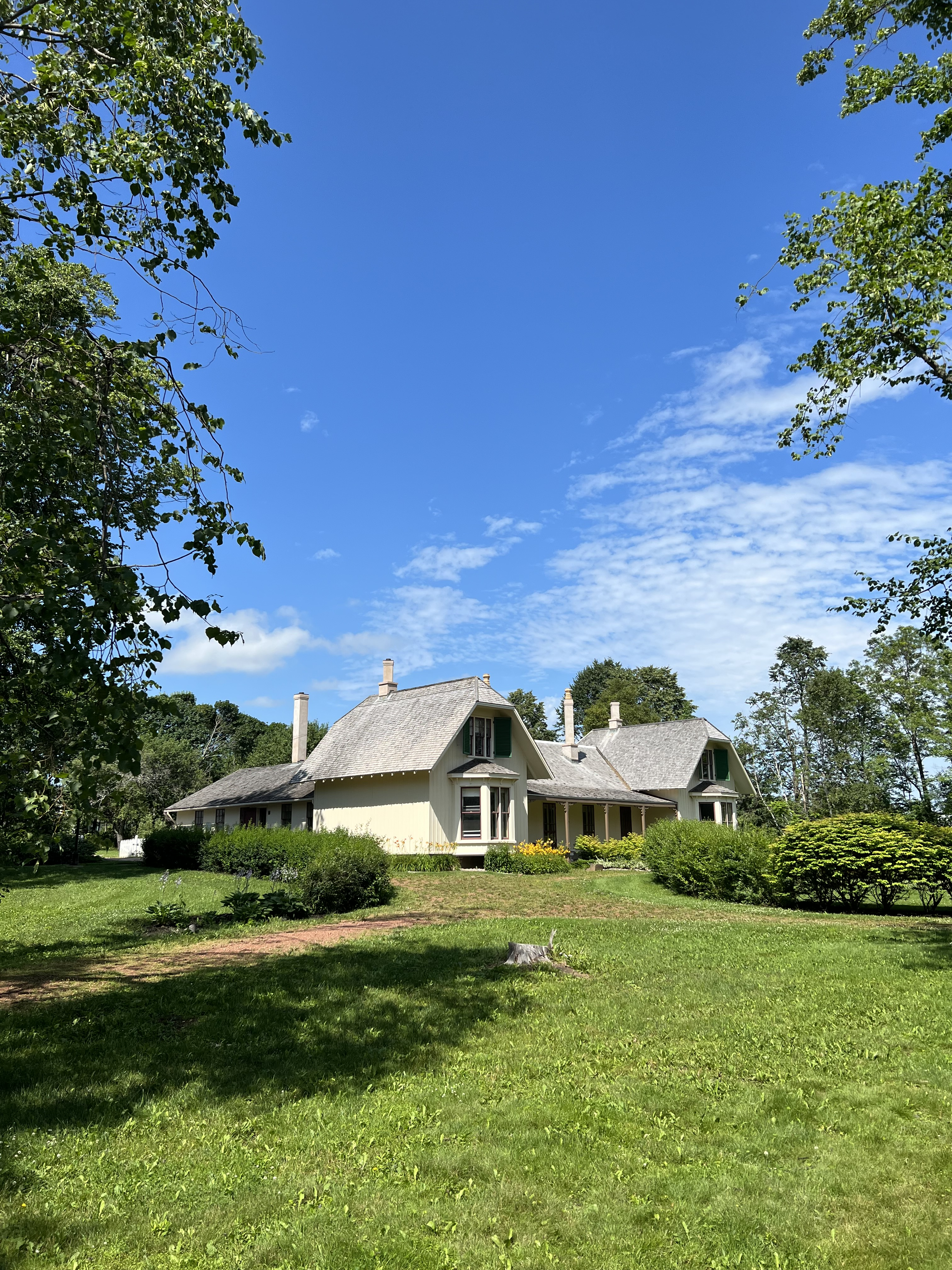
Ardgowan, Prince Edward Island

The Ardgowan estate contains the country cottage of William Henry Pope, one of the Fathers of Confederation. In contrast to the majority of islanders, Pope was decidedly pro-Confederation, and hosted delegates and observers of the Charlottetown Conference of 1864 at his house. In this relaxed social setting, participants better understood one another, helping to forge a new national vision.

Ardgowan National Historic Site was designated in 1966. The house and five of its original 76 acres were acquired by the national park service in 1967—the centennial of Confederation—to honor all Fathers of Confederation, and to preserve an example of a picturesque rural Victorian cottage of the Confederation Era.

The building and grounds are restored to an 1860s appearance. The grounds are open to the public, while the building houses Parks Canada staff, and is the administrative center for all national park system sites in Prince Edward Island.
