= Northumberland Provincial Park =

Protected area in Prince Edward Island, Canada

Coordinates: 45°58′4.4″N 62°42′32.8″W

Northumberland Provincial Park is a provincial park in Prince Edward Island, Canada. It overlooks the Northumberland strait.
