= Belmont Provincial Park =

Park in Prince Edward Island, Canada

Coordinates: 46°26′0.1″N 62°51′16.1″W

Belmont Provincial Park is a provincial park in Prince Edward Island, Canada. It is located on the coast of Malpeque Bay.
