= Buffaloland Provincial Park =

Park in Prince Edward Island, Canada

Coordinates: 46°5′33″N 62°37′4″W

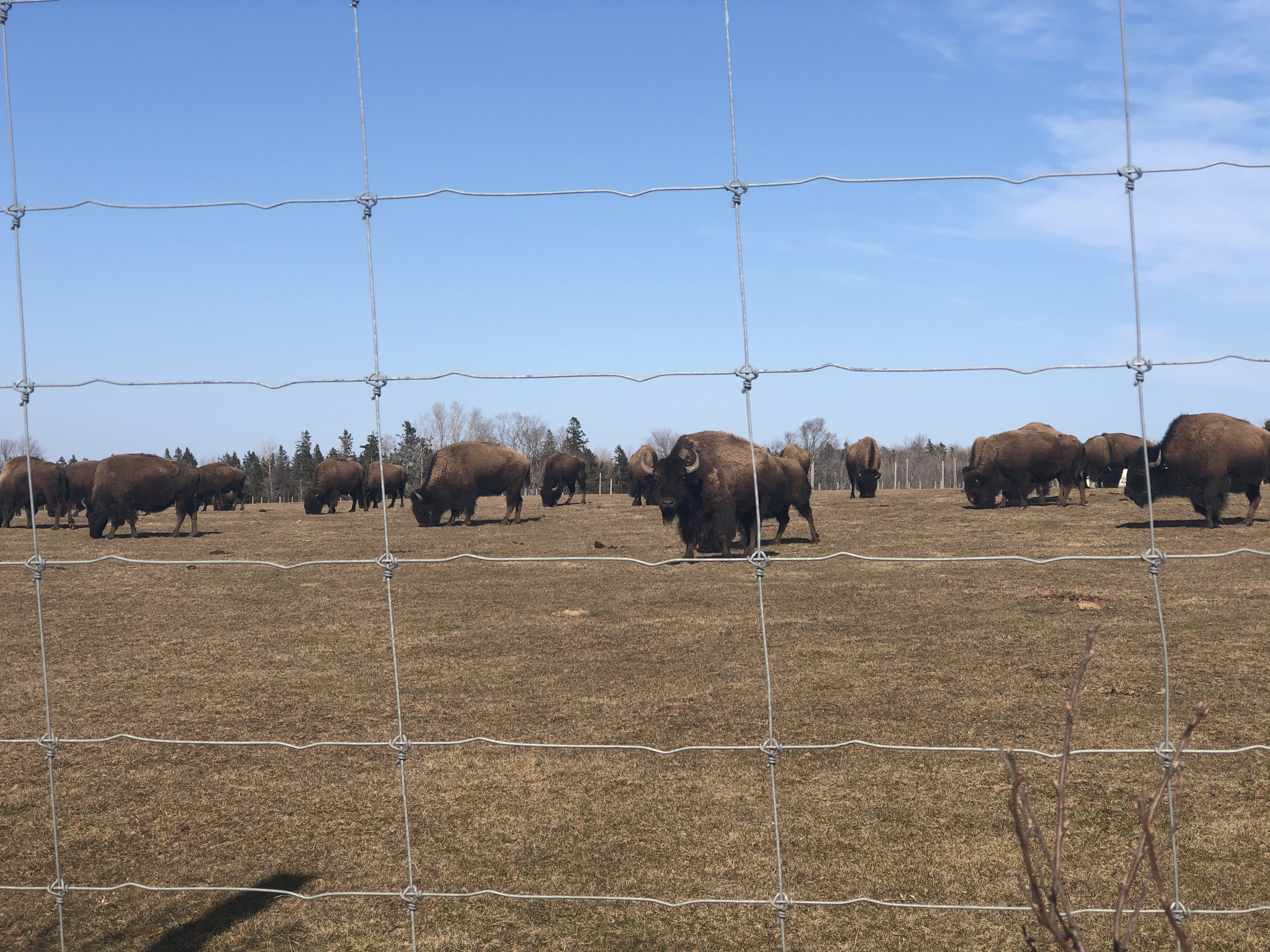

Buffaloland Provincial Park is a provincial park in Prince Edward Island, Canada. It is home to a bison sanctuary.

In 1973, the province of Alberta gifted the province of Prince Edward Island a herd of 15 bison. The bison have served as a tourist attraction for Prince Edward Island since then. In 2014, the government transferred the park to the Buddhist charity Moonlight International. Prior to this transfer, the government had been spending $40,000 annually on operating costs. In 2014, there were 38 bison in the park. In 2018, there were 56 bison in the park, partly due to the Buddhist belief in not harming animals.
