= Union Corner Provincial Park =

Park in Prince Edward Island, Canada

Coordinates: 46°23′17.7″N 63°59′34.6″W

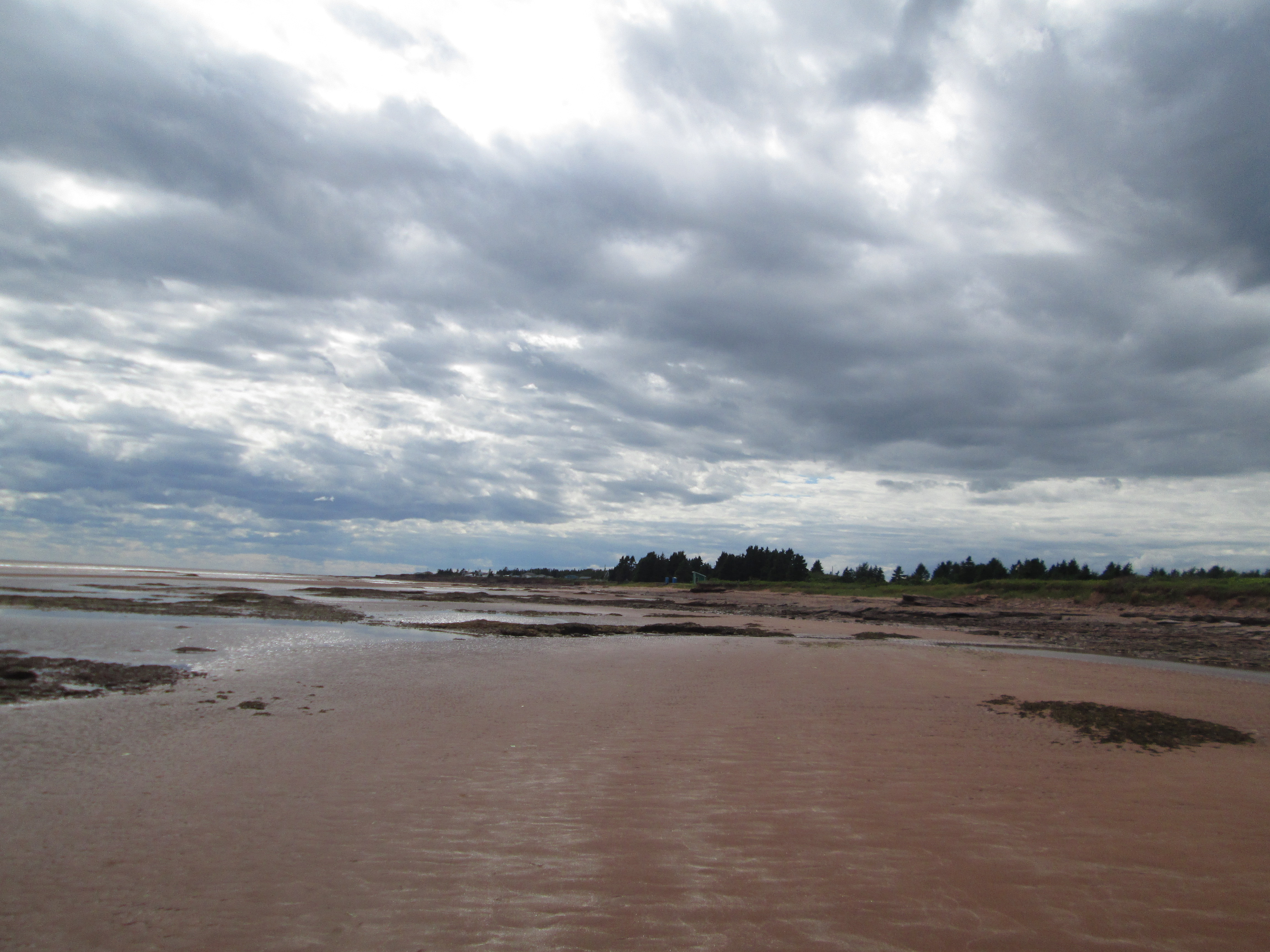
An overcast day at Union Corner Provincial Park

Union Corner Provincial Park is a provincial park on Bedeque Bay in Prince Edward Island, Canada.

Union Corner is a day use park only and open from June to September. The park is named for the nearby community of Union Corner, Prince Edward Island.

When exposed during low tides the park beach has an abundance of shellfish and attracts swimmers as well.
