= Basin Head Provincial Park =

Provincial park in Basin Head, Prince Edward Island, Canada

Coordinates: 46°22′39.5″N 62°6′32.9″W

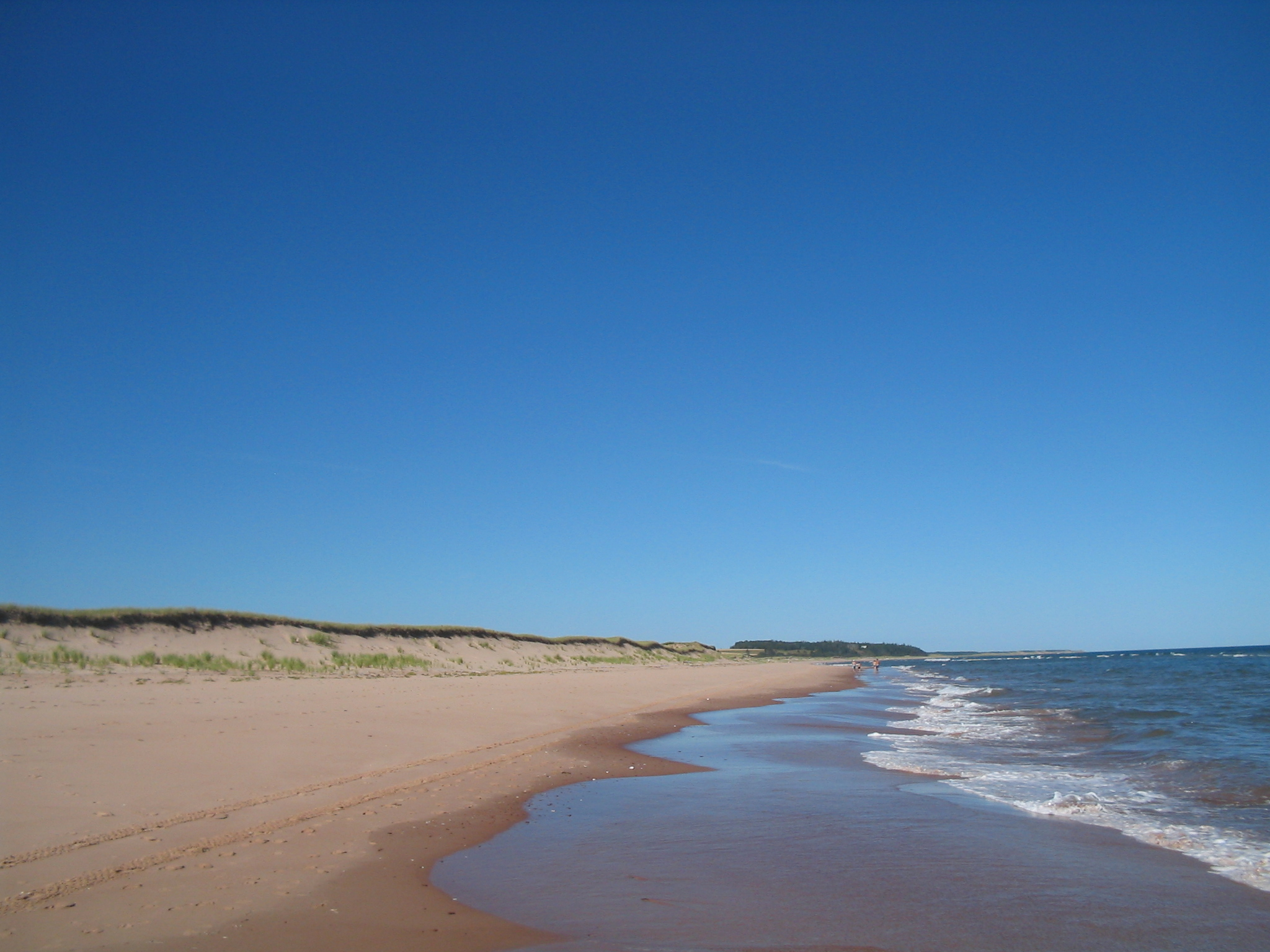
Beach

Basin Head Provincial Park is a provincial park located in Basin Head, Prince Edward Island, Canada. It is best known by its nickname "Singing Sands", in reference to the pure white sand that "sings" when stepped on, due to a high silica content. This sand is geologically unique to the area.

Basin Head Provincial Park features a fisheries museum, souvenir shops, and interpretive center. The beach itself is split into two sections, divided by a channel (known locally as the 'run'). A bridge spans the 'run', and is a popular attraction for jumping and diving. It is open as a tourist attraction, operated by Tourism PEI, during the summer months.

== History ==
Basin Head, located 13 kilometres east of Souris (the closest town), received its name from its wide, hollow bowl shaped form, like a basin. For many years it was a productive fishing area, with many local fisherman making their living fishing off shore. In 1937, it was decided to build a harbour and maintain a wharf at Basin Head. Much dredging was done, and the result was the large sand dunes on the beach which still remain today. The harbour was opened in 1938, and dredged again in 1959. In the peak time of fishing at the Basin there were about 25-30 boats fishing out of Basin Head. As many as twenty shacks owned by many of the fishermen were also located on the cape, along with a bunkhouse that housed at least twenty or more people. This was Basin Head's most productive era.

In 1973, the Basin Head Fisheries Museum was built under the direction of the Prince Edward Island Museum and Heritage Foundation and was open to the public. In 1995-96 huge renovations took place on the site by the Eastern Kings Development Association. This included a board walk which features access to the magnificent "Singing Sands" white sandy beach, gift shops, food, and beach services and a children's play village.

=== Natural attractions ===
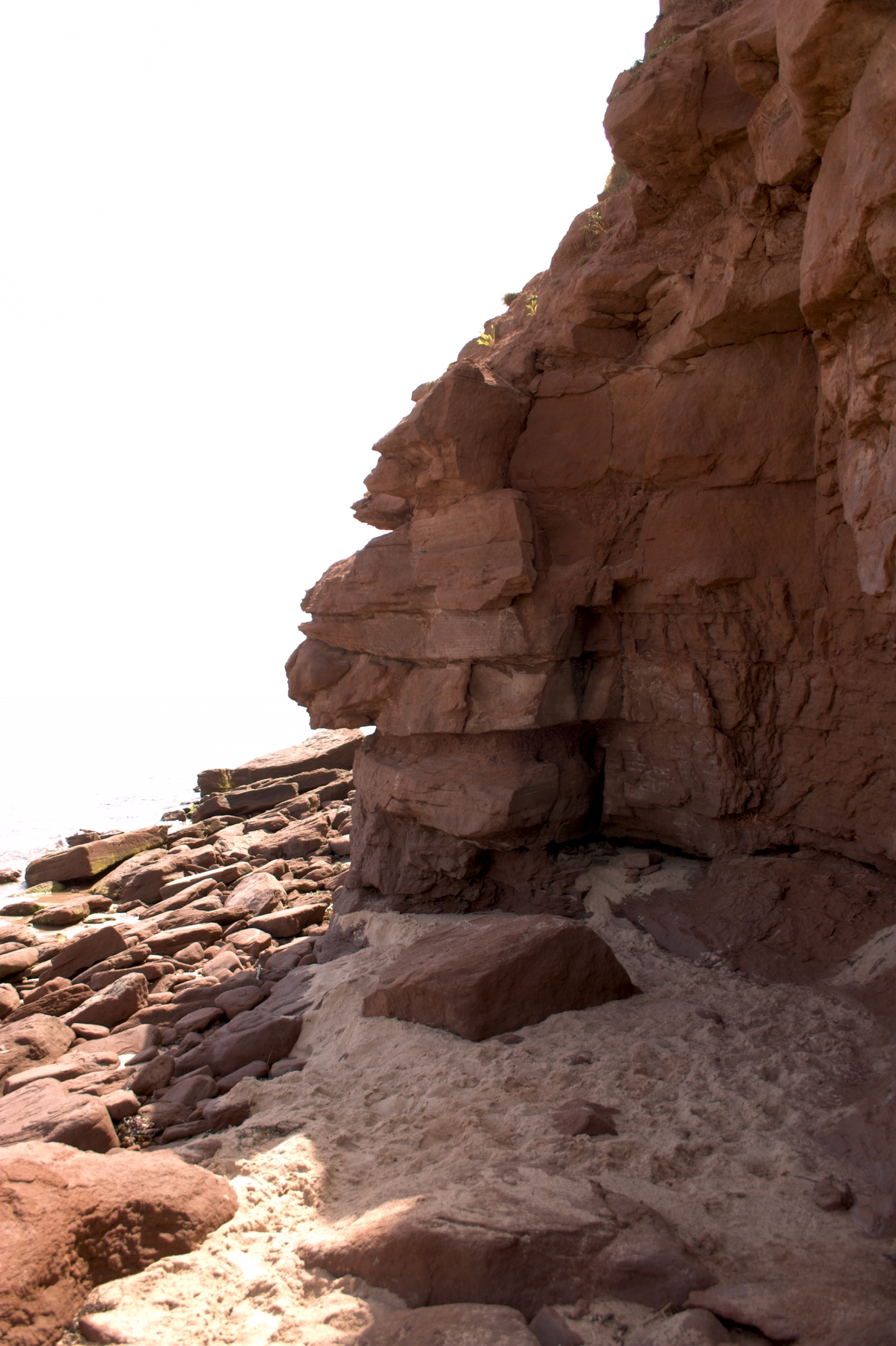
Rocky formation

The Basin Head area is rich in natural attractions. As mentioned above, one of the most unusual aspects of the beach is the sands high silica content. This silica, when heated by the sun and rubbed together, produces a high-pitched squeaking sound. Dragging one's feet through the sand is enough to elicit this effect.

The tidal lagoon behind the dunes is the only natural habitat for a variety of giant Irish moss called Chondrus crispus. To protect the unique strain, the Basin Head watershed is designated a Marine Protected Area. The moss is distinctive because it has a unique life cycle, does not attach to the bottom and is significantly larger than the varieties found elsewhere. It also has a higher concentration of carrageen, a stabilizing and thickening agent used in many household products.
