= Bonshaw Provincial Park =

Park in Prince Edward Island, Canada

Coordinates: 46°11′32.9″N 63°21′12.6″W

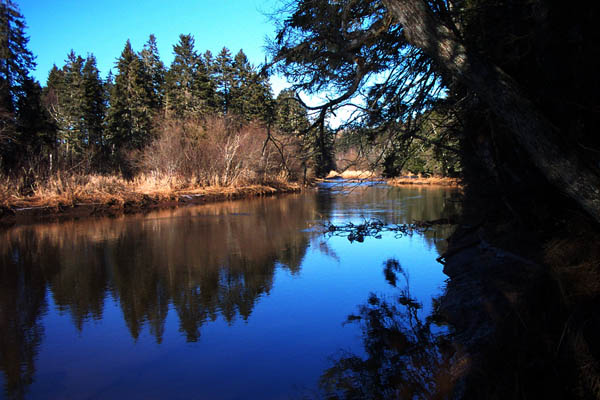
- Interactive map of Bonshaw Provincial Park
- Location: Prince Edward Island, Canada
- Area: 25 km

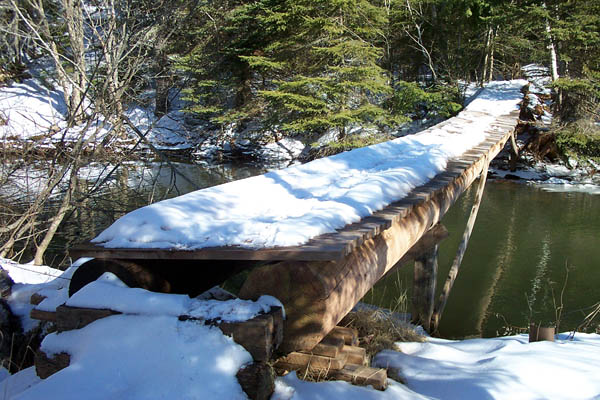
A log and boardwalk trail footbridge in Bonshaw Provincial Park

Bonshaw Provincial Park is a provincial park with hiking trails in Prince Edward Island, Canada. It has over 18km of hiking trails. Its main trail is named Ji'ka'we'katik-meaning "the place where bass is plentiful"-its traditional Mi'kmaq name.
