= Lot 5, Prince Edward Island =

- Township
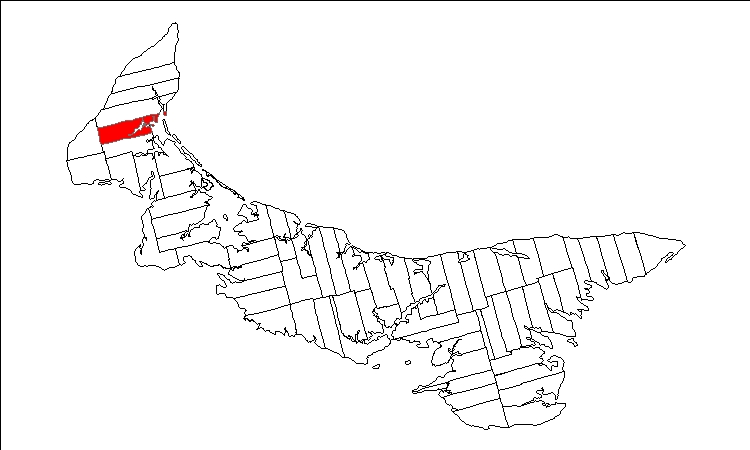
- Map of Prince Edward Island highlighting Lot 5
- Coordinates: 46°45′N 64°12′W
- Country: Canada
- Province: Prince Edward Island
- County: Prince County
- Parish: Egmont Parish

Area
  - Total: 80.61 km^{2} (31.12 sq mi)

Population (2016)
  - Total: 1,285
  - Density: 15.5/km^{2} (40/sq mi)
- Time zone: UTC-4 (AST)
  - Summer (DST): UTC-3 (ADT)
- Canadian Postal code: C0B
- Area code: 902
- NTS Map: 011L06
- GNBC Code: BAERK

Lot 5 is a township in Prince County, Prince Edward Island, Canada created during the 1764–1766 survey of Samuel Holland. It is part of Egmont Parish.

== Communities ==
Incorporated municipalities:

- Alberton
- Northport

Civic address communities:

- Alberton
- Bloomfield
- Bloomfield Corner
- Brooklyn
- Cascumpec
- Duvar
- Forestview
- Fortune Cove
- Glengarry
- Howlan
- Kelly Road
- Mill River East
- Northport
- Piusville
- Rosebank
- St. Anthony
- Union
- Woodstock

== History ==
Lot 5 was awarded to Edward Lewis in the 1767 land lottery while Lewis was the Member of Parliament (MP) for Radnor. The township became jointly owned with John Hill in 1779 and subsequently went through various owners under feudalism when Prince Edward Island was a British colony prior to Canadian Confederation.

== Demographics ==
Historical population
Year	Pop.	±%
1871	909	—
1881	1,465	+61.2%
1891	1,532	+4.6%
1901	1,263	−17.6%
1911	1,185	−6.2%
1921	1,286	+8.5%
1931	1,019	−20.8%
1941	1,044	+2.5%
2016	1,285	+23.1%
