= List of historic places in Prince County, Prince Edward Island =

This is a list of historic places in Prince County, Prince Edward Island entered on the Canadian Register of Historic Places, whether they are federal, provincial, or municipal. Places listed in Summerside are listed separately.

== List of historic places ==
Name	Address	Coordinates	Government recognition (CRHP №)	Wikidata ID	Image
Acadian Fishermen's Coop	8323 Rte. 11; Abrams Village PE	46°26′21″N 64°06′40″W	Prince Edward Island (21000)		Upload Photo
Chester Adams House	41 Reid Street; Alberton PE	46°48′53″N 64°03′50″W	Prince Edward Island (12724)		Upload Photo
Albany Little Zion Baptist Cemetery	22246 Trans Canada Highway - Route 1 Albany PE	46°16′07″N 63°35′42″W	Prince Edward Island (11851)		Upload Photo
Alberton Court House National Historic Site of Canada	457 Church Street; Alberton PE	46°48′44″N 64°04′07″W	Federal (7343), Prince Edward Island (1598)		Upload Photo
Alberton Museum's Heritage Centre	420 Church Street; Alberton PE	46°48′42″N 64°04′15″W	Prince Edward Island (9740)		More images
Alberton Railway Station	10 Railway Street; Alberton PE	46°48′48″N 64°04′06″W	Prince Edward Island (1747)		More images
Albion Street Inn	42 Albion Street; Alberton PE	46°48′42″N 64°04′01″W	Prince Edward Island (1774)		Upload Photo
Alexander Anderson House	267 Sherry Road; Fernwood PE	46°19′56″N 63°48′52″W	Prince Edward Island (20185)		Upload Photo
Allen Barn	5250 Rte. 11; Union Corner PE	46°23′22″N 63°59′55″W	Prince Edward Island (20999)		Upload Photo
Joseph-Felix Arsenault House	77 Mill Road; Wellington PE	46°27′18″N 64°00′03″W	Prince Edward Island (20994)		Upload Photo
Ashford Cottage	1494 Freetown Road; Freetown PE	46°22′29″N 63°36′58″W	Prince Edward Island (9700)		Upload Photo
Bell Haven	66 Bell Lane; Mill River East PE	46°45′01″N 64°09′43″W	Prince Edward Island (16409)		Upload Photo
Bideford Parsonage Museum	7 Bideford Road; Bideford PE	46°36′37″N 63°54′56″W	Prince Edward Island (13175)		Upload Photo
Briarwood	253 Matthews Lane; Union PE	46°47′57″N 64°04′38″W	Prince Edward Island (9901)		Upload Photo
Campbellton United Church	8797 Route 14; Campbellton PE	46°47′31″N 64°18′10″W	Prince Edward Island (9817)		Upload Photo
Cape Egmont Lighthouse	161 Phare du Cap Egmont Road; Cape Egmont PE	46°24′07″N 64°08′03″W	Federal (11078), Prince Edward Island (19206)		
Cape Wolfe Pioneer Roman Catholic Cemetery	Route 14; Cape Wolfe PE	46°43′40″N 64°23′13″W	Prince Edward Island (10797)		Upload Photo
Cascumpec United Church	13724 Cascumpec Road - Route 12; Cascumpec PE	46°45′48″N 64°06′30″W	Prince Edward Island (1618)		More images
Monsignor Jean Chiasson Birthplace	1323 Greenmount Road, Route 153; St. Felix PE	46°55′39″N 64°01′21″W	Prince Edward Island (2691)		Upload Photo
Captain John Champion House	342 - Route 152; Northport PE	46°47′56″N 64°03′34″W	Prince Edward Island (16463)		Upload Photo
Christ Church	17668 - Route 12; Kildare Capes PE	46°53′16″N 63°58′38″W	Prince Edward Island (9880)		Upload Photo
301 Church Street	301 Church Street; Alberton PE	46°48′38″N 64°04′52″W	Prince Edward Island (12621)		Upload Photo
Cold Comfort Farm	355 Matthews Lane; Union PE	46°47′42″N 64°04′29″W	Prince Edward Island (15262)		
Convent of Notre Dame-des-Anges	206 Maple Street; Tignish PE	46°57′14″N 64°02′11″W	Prince Edward Island (1904)		More images
Corpus Christi Church	31 Glenwood Church Road; Glenwood PE	46°38′22″N 64°19′04″W	Prince Edward Island (15150)		Upload Photo
Sebastian Davidson House	19558 Route 12; Anglo Tignish PE	46°57′51″N 64°00′38″W	Prince Edward Island (1820)		Upload Photo
Doma	21363 Trans Canada Highway - Route 1 Tryon PE	46°14′52″N 63°32′50″W	Prince Edward Island (6062)		Upload Photo
The Dunn House	286 Ashley Road; Brooklyn PE	46°47′49″N 64°06′29″W	Prince Edward Island (9822)		Upload Photo
Eglise Notre Dame du Mont Carmel	5785 Route 11; Mont Carmel PE	46°23′30″N 64°01′58″W	Prince Edward Island (1627)		More images
Essery House	1424 Route 152; Huntley PE	46°50′40″N 64°04′59″W	Prince Edward Island (9847)		Upload Photo
Fanning School	461 King Street; Malpeque PE	46°33′32″N 63°42′18″W	Prince Edward Island (20085)		Upload Photo
Former Fortune Cove Schoolhouse	165 Warren Road; Fortune Cove PE	46°45′09″N 64°07′39″W	Prince Edward Island (16443)		
The French Lane	From Route 12 to Cascumpec Bay shore Alberton PE	46°48′59″N 64°03′07″W	Prince Edward Island (9804)		Upload Photo
Gallant Barn	8977 Rte. 11; Abrams Village PE	46°27′23″N 64°04′51″W	Prince Edward Island (20998)		Upload Photo
Lemant Gallant House	8977 Rte. 11; Abrams Village PE	46°27′23″N 64°04′49″W	Prince Edward Island (20993)		Upload Photo
Gallant House	468 Church Street; Alberton PE	46°48′44″N 64°04′05″W	Prince Edward Island (12661)		Upload Photo
George Gard House	90 Prince William Street; Alberton PE	46°49′00″N 64°04′23″W	Prince Edward Island (16421)		Upload Photo
Samuel Gard House	1440 Mill River East Road - Route 145; Mill River East PE	46°45′58″N 64°08′42″W	Prince Edward Island (9884)		Upload Photo
Gaudet Lodge	197 Dalton Avenue; Tignish PE	46°57′01″N 64°01′57″W	Prince Edward Island (1942)		Upload Photo
Gillis Barn	32 Lady Slipper Drive, South; Miscouche PE	46°25′50″N 63°52′15″W	Prince Edward Island (20997)		Upload Photo
The Gordon Cemetery	1645 Route 152; Huntley PE	46°51′13″N 64°04′52″W	Prince Edward Island (9849)		More images
Hudson Gordon House	1681 Route 152; Montrose PE	46°51′18″N 64°04′48″W	Prince Edward Island (1815)		Upload Photo
Gordon Memorial United Church	396 Church Street; Alberton PE	46°48′40″N 64°04′22″W	Prince Edward Island (9742)		More images
Government of Canada Building, Tignish	289 Church Street; Tignish PE	46°57′06″N 64°02′02″W	Prince Edward Island (10533)		
Graham House	413 Church Street; Alberton PE	46°48′42″N 64°04′17″W	Prince Edward Island (12626)		Upload Photo
The Green	192 Founders Lane; Anglo Tignish PE	46°57′39″N 64°00′01″W	Prince Edward Island (1647)		Upload Photo
Hacker House	75 Blue Shank Road; Wilmot Valley PE	46°23′29″N 63°44′08″W	Prince Edward Island (19660)		Upload Photo
Halupa's Jewelry	480 Main Street; Alberton PE	46°48′44″N 64°03′51″W	Prince Edward Island (12703)		Upload Photo
Hamilton Hall	2282 Hamilton Road, Route 104; Hamilton PE	46°29′47″N 63°41′59″W	Prince Edward Island (1641)		Upload Photo
Handrahan's Cutting	Handrahan's Cutting; Tignish PE	46°33′49″N 64°02′25″W	Prince Edward Island (1926)		Upload Photo
Holy Trinity Alma Anglican Church	40986 Western Road, Route 2 Alma PE	46°51′50″N 64°06′28″W	Prince Edward Island (8707)		More images
Howard House	7160 Route 14; Cape Wolfe PE	46°44′20″N 64°22′22″W	Prince Edward Island (2013)		Upload Photo
The Hudson Homestead	13389 Cascumpec Road, Route 12; Cascumpec PE	46°45′38″N 64°05′26″W	Prince Edward Island (6298)		Upload Photo
Hunter House	1013 Route 152; Huntley PE	46°49′38″N 64°04′25″W	Prince Edward Island (9827)		Upload Photo
Immaculate Conception Parochial House - Brae	2877 Beaton Road, Route 138; Brae PE	46°38′19″N 64°11′21″W	Prince Edward Island (1900)		Upload Photo
Immaculate Conception Roman Catholic Church - Palmer Road	986 Palmer Road, Route 156; St. Louis PE	46°54′48″N 64°09′26″W	Prince Edward Island (1894)		More images
7 Imperial Street	7 Imperial Street; Kensington PE	46°26′16″N 63°38′28″W	Prince Edward Island (18737)		Upload Photo
Indian Head Lighthouse	End of Summerside Harbour Breakwater; Lower Bedeque PE	46°22′47″N 63°49′02″W	Prince Edward Island (19730)		
Indian River Pioneer Roman Catholic Cemetery	Easter Road; Indian River PE	46°28′18″N 63°41′22″W	Prince Edward Island (16141)		Upload Photo
Institute Hall	524 Church Street; Alberton PE	46°48′47″N 64°03′49″W	Prince Edward Island (16482)		
Irving Barn	14751 Cascumpec Road - Route 12; Union PE	46°48′13″N 64°05′21″W	Prince Edward Island (20996)		Upload Photo
The Irving House	14751 Cascumpec Road - Route 12; Union PE	46°48′13″N 64°05′22″W	Prince Edward Island (3322)		Upload Photo
Pierre Jacques Pioneer Cemetery	MacDonald Road, Route 176; Glenwood PE	46°38′09″N 64°18′38″W	Prince Edward Island (10767)		
Dr. Jonathon Jameson House	2133 Rte. 112; Bedeque PE	46°20′13″N 63°43′29″W	Prince Edward Island (19742)		Upload Photo
Jeffery House	1111 Centre Line Road - Route 151; Alma PE	46°51′37″N 64°08′11″W	Prince Edward Island (9808)		Upload Photo
Jeffery Homestead	948 Center Line Road, Rte. 151; Alma PE	46°51′45″N 64°07′35″W	Prince Edward Island (17781)		Upload Photo
John Keefe / Alfred Gionet House	251, Route 152; Northport PE	46°47′43″N 64°03′42″W	Prince Edward Island (15402)		Upload Photo
Keir House	140 Plug Street; Malpeque PE	46°31′28″N 63°41′42″W	Prince Edward Island (18765)		Upload Photo
Keir Memorial Museum	2214 Route 20; Malpeque PE	46°31′44″N 63°41′12″W	Prince Edward Island (1775)		Upload Photo
Kensington Railway Station (Prince Edward Island) National Historic Site of Canada	Kensington PE	46°26′01″N 63°38′00″W	Federal (7447), Prince Edward Island (20380), Kensington municipality (19248)		
The Kirkham House	190 Fortune Road - Route 172; Fortune Cove PE	46°45′29″N 64°06′59″W	Prince Edward Island (9862)		Upload Photo
Knutsford School	2777 O'Leary Road, Route 142; Knutsford PE	46°41′52″N 64°16′39″W	Prince Edward Island (1673)		Upload Photo
La Petite France	441 Church Street; Alberton PE	46°48′44″N 64°04′08″W	Prince Edward Island (6296)		Upload Photo
Leard House	519 Church Street; Alberton PE	46°48′48″N 64°03′48″W	Prince Edward Island (9747)		Upload Photo
Cornelius Leard House	2904 Route 112; Lower Bedeque PE	46°20′39″N 63°45′51″W	Prince Edward Island (19168)		Upload Photo
Lot 7 Pioneer Roman Catholic Cemetery	Route 14; Burton PE	46°45′07″N 64°21′44″W	Prince Edward Island (10806)		Upload Photo
Lyle House	5498 Rte. 12; Birch Hill PE	46°33′05″N 63°52′25″W	Prince Edward Island (20379)		Upload Photo
Malpeque Community Centre	2197 Route 20; Malpeque PE	46°31′44″N 63°41′16″W	Prince Edward Island (20379)		Upload Photo
Maple Grove Farm	333 Church Street; Tignish PE	46°57′24″N 64°02′04″W	Prince Edward Island (16365)		Upload Photo
Maplethorpe	2123 Rte. 112; Bedeque PE	46°20′12″N 63°43′29″W	Prince Edward Island (20974)		Upload Photo
Miminegash United Church	10710 Route 14; St. Lawrence PE	46°51′17″N 64°13′29″W	Prince Edward Island (9889)		Upload Photo
Miscouche Villa	20 Lady Slipper Drive North; Miscouche PE	46°26′01″N 63°52′02″W	Prince Edward Island (21001)		Upload Photo
Moase Blacksmith Shop	25578, Route 2 New Annan PE	46°25′23″N 63°41′06″W	Prince Edward Island (1679)		Upload Photo
Hugh Montgomery House	149 Montgomery Road; Malpeque PE	46°32′41″N 63°43′06″W	Prince Edward Island (19510)		Upload Photo
L.M. Montgomery Lower Bedeque School	14 New Road; Lower Bedeque PE	46°20′36″N 63°45′57″W	Prince Edward Island (3345)		Upload Photo
Morrison House	424 Church Street; Alberton PE	46°48′42″N 64°04′12″W	Prince Edward Island (12667)		Upload Photo
North Cape Lighthouse	2183 Rte. 12; Seacow Pond PE	47°03′27″N 63°59′48″W	Federal (11477), Prince Edward Island (19725)		
Northport Rear Range Lighthouse	224 Highway 152; Northport PE	46°47′39″N 64°03′46″W	Federal (20730), Prince Edward Island (20884)		
The Oaks	15483, Route 12; Alberton PE	46°49′20″N 64°03′17″W	Prince Edward Island (12761)		Upload Photo
O'Leary Railway Station	513 Main Street; O'Leary PE	46°42′27″N 64°13′30″W	Prince Edward Island (20441)		
Old Dock Cemetery	Route 12; Union PE	46°48′34″N 64°04′59″W	Prince Edward Island (16464)		
Old St. James Anglican Church	5875 Route 12; Port Hill PE	46°34′02″N 63°52′44″W	Prince Edward Island (8722)		Upload Photo
Omnibus Cemetery	18968 Route 12; Tignish Shore PE	46°56′27″N 64°00′32″W	Prince Edward Island (1720)		Upload Photo
Orchard Brook Farm	91 Dunbar Road; Alma PE	46°51′57″N 64°07′49″W	Prince Edward Island (9811)		Upload Photo
The Oulton House	98 Princess Street; Alberton PE	46°48′47″N 64°03′25″W	Prince Edward Island (9781)		Upload Photo
Oulton's Island	Oulton's Island; Northport PE	46°47′16″N 64°02′42″W	Prince Edward Island (10223)		More images
PEI Shellfish Museum	154 Bideford Road; Ellerslie PE	46°36′59″N 63°54′57″W	Prince Edward Island (20440)		Upload Photo
Kenneth Poirier Apartments	107 Dufferin Street; Alberton PE	46°48′50″N 64°03′48″W	Prince Edward Island (9799)		Upload Photo
Price-Affleck House	3211 Rte. 112; Lower Bedeque PE	46°21′09″N 63°46′39″W	Prince Edward Island (20882)		Upload Photo
Primrose Lane	456 Main Street; Alberton PE	46°48′42″N 64°03′51″W	Prince Edward Island (12682)		Upload Photo
Princetown United Church	18 Malpeque Road; Princetown PE	46°31′47″N 63°41′16″W	Prince Edward Island (7435)		Upload Photo
Ramsay Stone House	590 Beech Point Road; Hamilton PE	46°29′38″N 63°44′26″W	Prince Edward Island (18616)		Upload Photo
Reilly Burial Plot	Route 14; Cape Wolfe PE	46°43′29″N 64°23′28″W	Prince Edward Island (13052)		Upload Photo
William Richards Carriage Barn	63 MacKie Road; Ellerslie-Bideford PE	46°36′49″N 63°54′45″W	Prince Edward Island (20678)		Upload Photo
William Richards House	63 MacKie Road; Ellerslie-Bideford PE	46°36′48″N 63°54′41″W	Prince Edward Island (20883)		Upload Photo
Sacred Heart Parish House	341 Main Street; Alberton PE	46°48′21″N 64°03′40″W	Prince Edward Island (9751)		More images
St. Anne's Roman Catholic Church	15 Eagle Feather Trail; Lennox Island PE	46°36′02″N 63°51′21″W	Prince Edward Island (16621), Lennox Island municipality (20381)		
St. Anthony's Pioneer Roman Catholic Cemetery	Cemetery Road; Cascumpec PE	46°45′21″N 64°04′48″W	Prince Edward Island (16121)		
St. Anthony's Parish House	37947 Western Road - Route 2 Woodstock PE	46°44′20″N 64°10′34″W	Prince Edward Island (16401)		
St. Anthony's Roman Catholic Church, Bloomfield	12 Howlan Road, Route 143; Woodstock PE	46°44′18″N 64°10′34″W	Prince Edward Island (15242)		
St. Brigid's Old Roman Catholic Cemetery	Canadian Road - Route 168; Foxley River PE	46°41′34″N 64°00′48″W	Prince Edward Island (16128)		
St. Brigid's Roman Catholic Church	14 Canadian Road, Route 168; Foxley River PE	46°41′34″N 64°00′45″W	Prince Edward Island (1636)		More images
St. John the Baptist R. C. Presbytery	9 Main Drive; Miscouche PE	46°25′57″N 63°52′02″W	Prince Edward Island (20878)		Upload Photo
St. John the Baptist Roman Catholic Church	10 Lady Slipper Drive North; Miscouche PE	46°26′00″N 63°52′02″W	Prince Edward Island (16622)		
St. John's Anglican Church, Ellerslie	7716 - Route 12; Ellerslie PE	46°36′33″N 63°55′57″W	Prince Edward Island (19165)		Upload Photo
St. Malachy's Roman Catholic Church	40 Anderson Road; Kinkora PE	46°19′21″N 63°35′36″W	Prince Edward Island (16585)		Upload Photo
St. Mary's Church, Indian River	1374 Hamilton Road; Indian River PE	46°28′34″N 63°40′10″W	Prince Edward Island (18823)		
St. Mark's Anglican Church	49 Victoria Street East; Kensington PE	46°26′16″N 63°38′06″W	Prince Edward Island (16561)		Upload Photo
St. Mary's Church, Indian River	1374 Hamilton Road, Route 104; Indian River PE	46°28′35″N 63°40′08″W	Prince Edward Island (15781)		
St. Patrick's Roman Catholic Church	4284 - Route 12; Bayside PE	46°30′27″N 63°54′46″W	Prince Edward Island (16541)		
St. Peter's Anglican Church	498 Main Street; Alberton PE	46°48′45″N 64°03′53″W	Prince Edward Island (9733)		Upload Photo
St. Simon and St. Jude Roman Catholic Church	208 Maple Street; Tignish PE	46°57′12″N 64°02′10″W	Prince Edward Island (1642)		More images
Sea Rescue Station	296, Route 152; Northport PE	46°47′48″N 64°03′33″W	Prince Edward Island (15371)		
Seacow Head Lighthouse	198 Lighthouse Road; Fernwood PE	46°18′58″N 63°48′37″W	Federal (11035), Prince Edward Island (19528), Fernwood municipality (19529)		
Sharpe House	512 MacIntyre Road; Kelvin Grove PE	46°25′00″N 63°39′55″W	Prince Edward Island (20484)		Upload Photo
South Shore United Church	85 Route 10; Tryon PE	46°14′18″N 63°32′36″W	Prince Edward Island (12207)		Upload Photo
Taylor House	171 Taylor Road; North Bedeque PE	46°23′05″N 63°43′35″W	Prince Edward Island (20876)		Upload Photo
Tryon Christian Church Cemetery	21290 Trans Canada Highway; Tryon PE	46°14′42″N 63°32′44″W	Prince Edward Island (10622)		Upload Photo
74 Victoria Street West	74 Victoria Street West; Kensington PE	46°26′10″N 63°38′21″W	Prince Edward Island (20086)		Upload Photo
West Cape Presbyterian Cemetery	Route 14; West Cape PE	46°40′33″N 64°24′40″W	Prince Edward Island (16103)		Upload Photo
West Point Lighthouse	364 Cedar Dunes Park Road; West Point PE	46°37′12″N 64°23′11″W	Prince Edward Island (18794)		Upload Photo
J.C. Wilkinson's Store	4070 Rte. 142; Springfield West PE	46°41′02″N 64°21′35″W	Prince Edward Island (20875)		Upload Photo
Williams Barn	8579 Rte. 12; Poplar Grove PE	46°38′39″N 63°56′55″W	Prince Edward Island (20873)		Upload Photo
Little Harry Williams House	8655 Rte. 12; Poplar Grove PE	46°39′08″N 63°57′08″W	Prince Edward Island (20874)		Upload Photo
Woodbine Cottage	6049 Rte. 12; Port Hill PE	46°34′35″N 63°52′49″W	Prince Edward Island (19743)		Upload Photo
The Wright House	1214 Callbeck Street, Route 171; Bedeque PE	46°20′18″N 63°43′12″W	Prince Edward Island (5366)		Upload Photo
Jesse Wright House	295 Clark Road; North Bedeque PE	46°21′43″N 63°44′18″W	Prince Edward Island (20186)		Upload Photo
Yeo House	334 Green Park Road; Port Hill PE	46°35′20″N 63°53′36″W	Prince Edward Island (1259)		Upload Photo
Zetland Masonic Lodge No. 7	119 Poplar Street; Alberton PE	46°48′42″N 64°03′49″W	Prince Edward Island (9730)		More images

== See also ==
- List of historic places in Prince Edward Island
- List of National Historic Sites of Canada in Prince Edward Island
- Heritage Places Protection Act
