= Lot 4, Prince Edward Island =

- Township
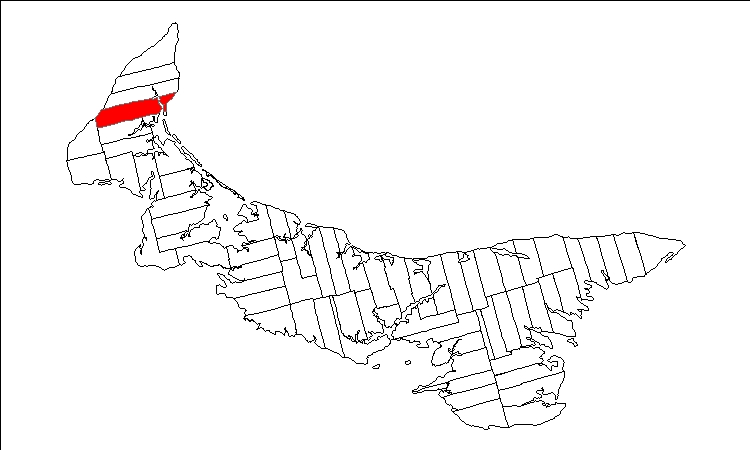
- Map of Prince Edward Island highlighting Lot 4
- Coordinates: 46°48′41″N 64°9′54″W
- Country: Canada
- Province: Prince Edward Island
- County: Prince County
- Parish: Egmont Parish

Area
  - Total: 102.83 km^{2} (39.70 sq mi)

Population (2006)
  - Total: 1,175
  - Density: 11.4/km^{2} (30/sq mi)
- Time zone: UTC-4 (AST)
  - Summer (DST): UTC-3 (ADT)
- Canadian Postal code: C0B
- Area code: 902
- NTS Map: 021I16
- GNBC Code: BAEQQ

Lot 4 is a township in Prince County, Prince Edward Island, Canada created during the 1764–1766 survey of Samuel Holland. It is part of Egmont Parish.

== Communities ==
Incorporated municipalities:

- Alberton
- Greenmount-Montrose

Civic address communities:

- Alberton
- Bloomfield
- Brockton
- Brooklyn
- Campbellton
- Central Kildare
- Elmsdale
- Glengarry
- Huntley
- Montrose
- O'Brien Road
- Piusville
- Rosebank
- Roseville
- Union

== History ==
Lot 4 was awarded to Augustus Keppel, 1st Viscount Keppel in the 1767 land lottery. The township subsequently went through various owners under feudalism when Prince Edward Island was a British colony prior to Canadian Confederation.

== Demographics ==
Historical population
Year	Pop.	±%
1871	1,460	—
1881	2,258	+54.7%
1891	2,396	+6.1%
1901	2,355	−1.7%
1911	2,230	−5.3%
1921	1,383	−38.0%
1931	1,230	−11.1%
1941	1,352	+9.9%
2006	1,175	−13.1%
