= North Cape (Prince Edward Island) =

Coordinates: 47°04′N 64°00′W

Location of North Cape in PEI

North Cape is a cape at the northwesternmost extremity of Prince Edward Island, Canada. It is located within the community of Seacow Pond.

North Cape is the dividing point for delineating the western limits of the Northumberland Strait from the Gulf of St. Lawrence, as determined by the Canadian Hydrographic Service. A 2 km (1.2 mi) natural rock reef extends offshore from the cape. It is reportedly the longest natural rock reef composed of sedimentary rock in North America.

The Canadian Coast Guard maintains a lighthouse at the cape as a navigational aid beacon to warn mariners of the hazard posed by the reef. The Meteorological Service of Canada has a remote weather station adjacent to the lighthouse (ID - WNE).

During the summer, Irish moss seaweed is commercially harvested from the shores around North Cape and surrounding areas.

== Tourism ==
The land at North Cape is owned by the Government of Prince Edward Island. In recent decades the province has undertaken several initiatives to develop tourism facilities, namely a visitor information centre which interprets the natural history of the cape. There is also a gift shop and the "Wind and Reef" restaurant at the visitor centre.

The Black Marsh Nature Trail, which is a 5.5 kilometer trail that is open to the public, focuses on the fauna and flora of the area.

== Wind Energy Institute of Canada ==
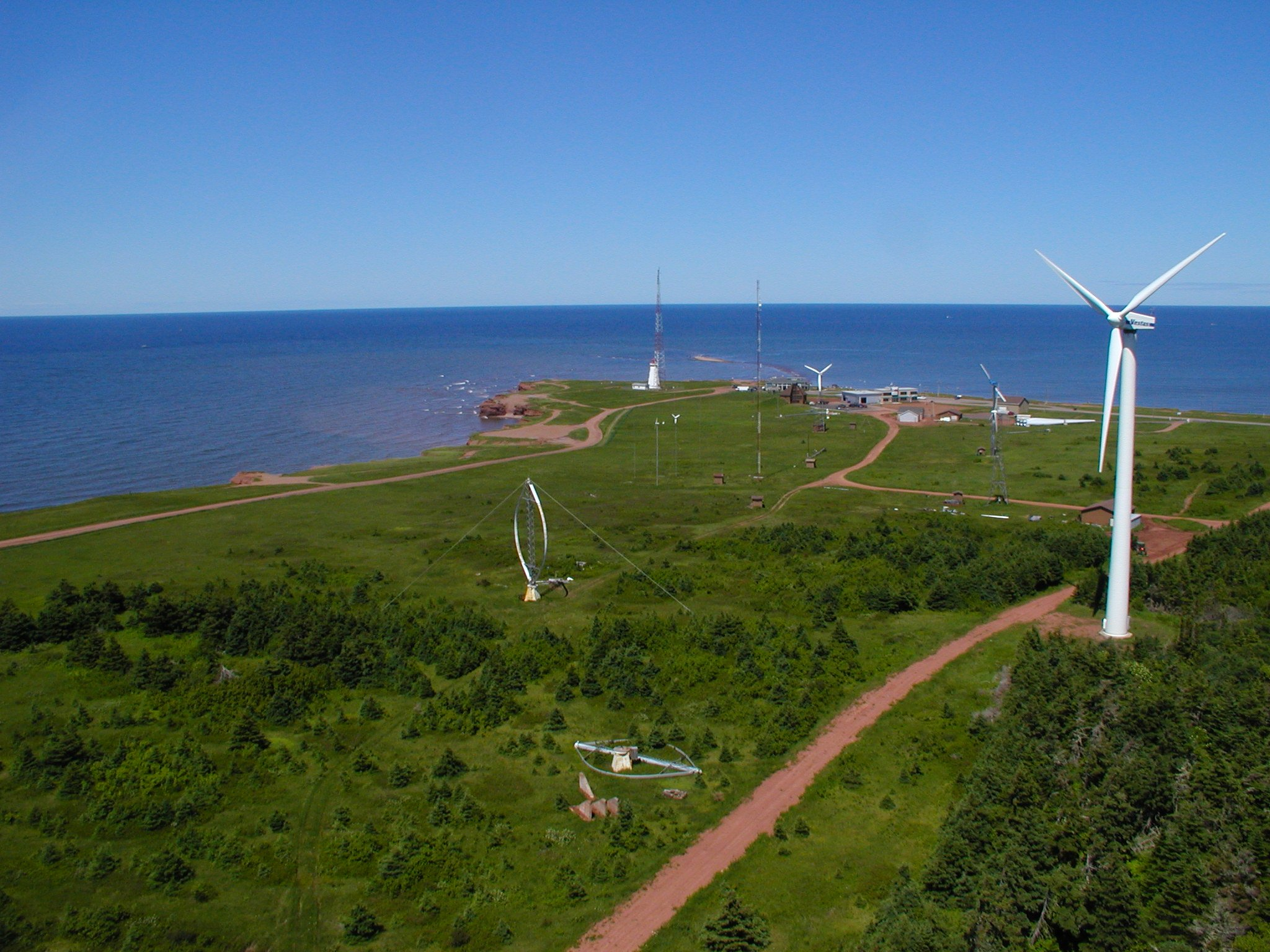
Wind Energy Institute of Canada

The Wind Energy Institute of Canada (WEICan), formerly known as the Atlantic Wind Test, is a wind energy research and testing facility immediately south of North Cape that conceived in the 1970s under a joint project between the Government of Canada and the Government of Prince Edward Island. Opened in 1980, the Atlantic Wind Test Site was located on the provincial government's property, it was established as a by-product of the 1970s energy crisis and was one of a number of renewable and alternative energy projects undertaken in Prince Edward Island at that time.

Renamed WEICan in the 2000s, the facility specializes in the development of small wind turbines and provides testing of equipment along with research and certification services for developers. WEICan is Canada's official wind research and development facility. The facility provides a controlled location and support for harsh environment equipment tests, including salt spray, extreme cold and high winds; this is considered ideal for the testing of small turbines designed for farms and isolated areas, particularly in the Arctic. Clients pay an hourly rate in order to cover the costs of running the institute. The first testings of Whalepower blades were done at this site.

A $12 million grant was given to WEICan in order to construct a wind energy storage facility which is used to understand how much energy is lost when storing wind energy over different periods of time. The storage facility was completed in 2011.

=== Hydrogen Village ===
Associated with WEICan's North Cape facility, the Hydrogen Village is Canada's first grid-independent sustainable energy system for northern and remote locations. The site received a $5.1 million grant from the Government of Canada to help supplement $10.3 million provided by Hydrogenics and the Prince Edward Island Energy Corporation. The site is still in the testing stages. Water molecules are split by electricity produced by wind turbines in order to create hydrogen and oxygen. The hydrogen molecules are stored in holding tanks for various uses with the system being designed to provide energy, namely in the form of electrical generation. Hydrogen is produced and stored when conditions are windy. When conditions are calm, the hydrogen, mixed with diesel, is used in generators in order to produce electricity.

== North Cape Wind Farm ==
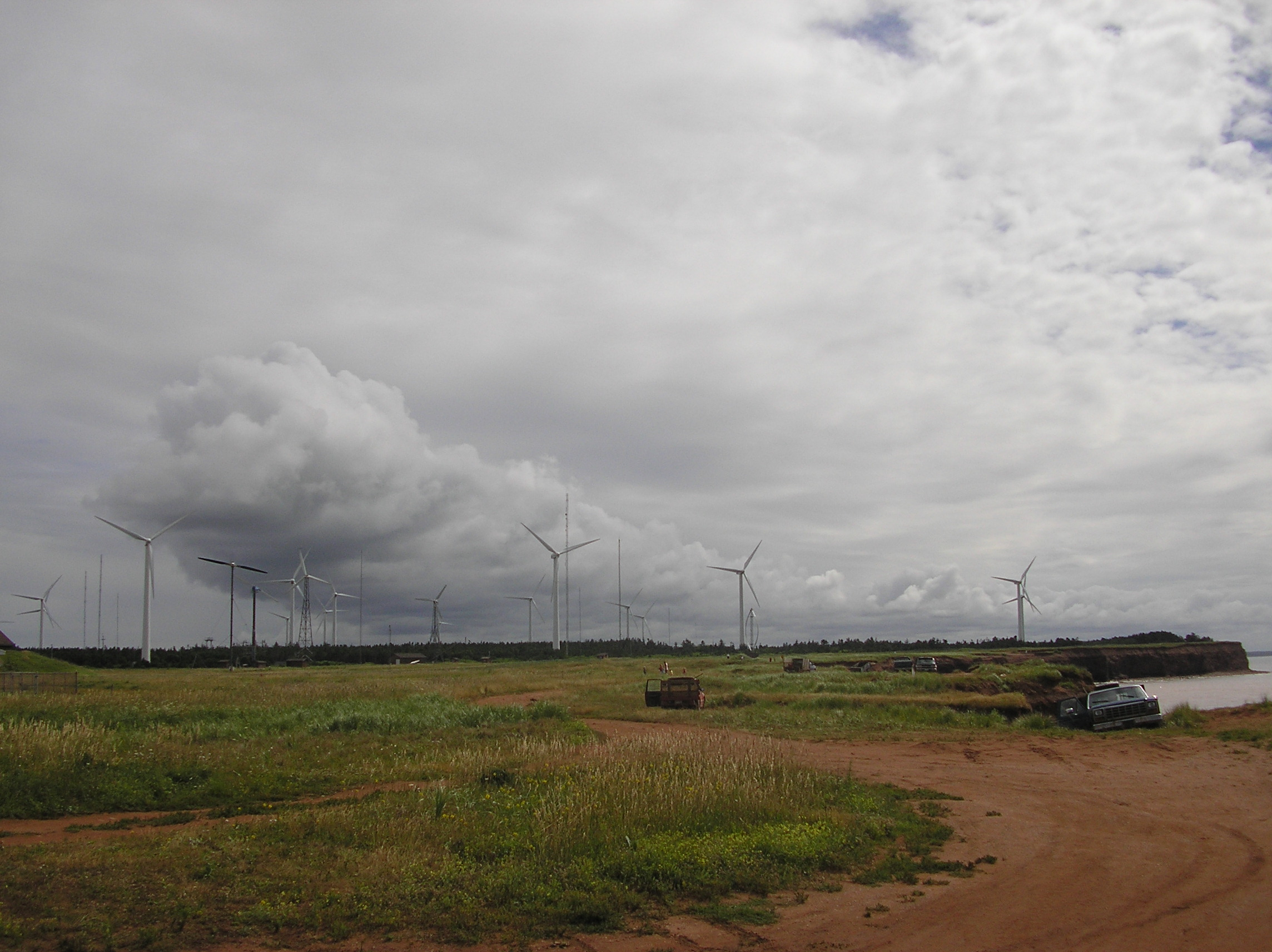
PEI wind farm

The North Cape Wind Farm is a small 16-turbine wind farm located at North Cape in the community of Seacow Pond, immediately south of the WEICan facility. The wind farm was developed in two 8-turbine phases with phase one being completed in November 2001 and phase two being completed in November 2003. The wind turbines being used are the Vestas V-47-660 model with a rated generating capacity of 660 kWh (2,400 MJ). At 100% production, the 16 turbines are capable of generating 10.5600 MWh (38,016 MJ) of electrical power per year.

The North Cape Wind Farm is owned and operated by the Prince Edward Island Energy Corporation, a Crown corporation of the Government of Prince Edward Island. Capital to build the wind farm was raised through the purchase of PEI Energy Saving Bonds.

Electricity generated by the North Cape Wind Farm is transported over a 28 km (17 mi) 69 kilovolt transmission line (also owned by PEI Energy Corporation) to a Maritime Electric substation in Huntley. This line was constructed under phase one. The wind farm's electricity is purchased by Maritime Electric for distribution to customers in Prince Edward Island.

In 2003 the wind farm was supplying 7.5% of Prince Edward Island's electricity.

== Gallery ==
Shore line of North Cape

Wind and Reef, Gift Shop, and Tourism Information located in North Cape

Wind Energy Institute of Canada located in North Cape

Hydrogen Village located in North Cape

Training tower located in North Cape

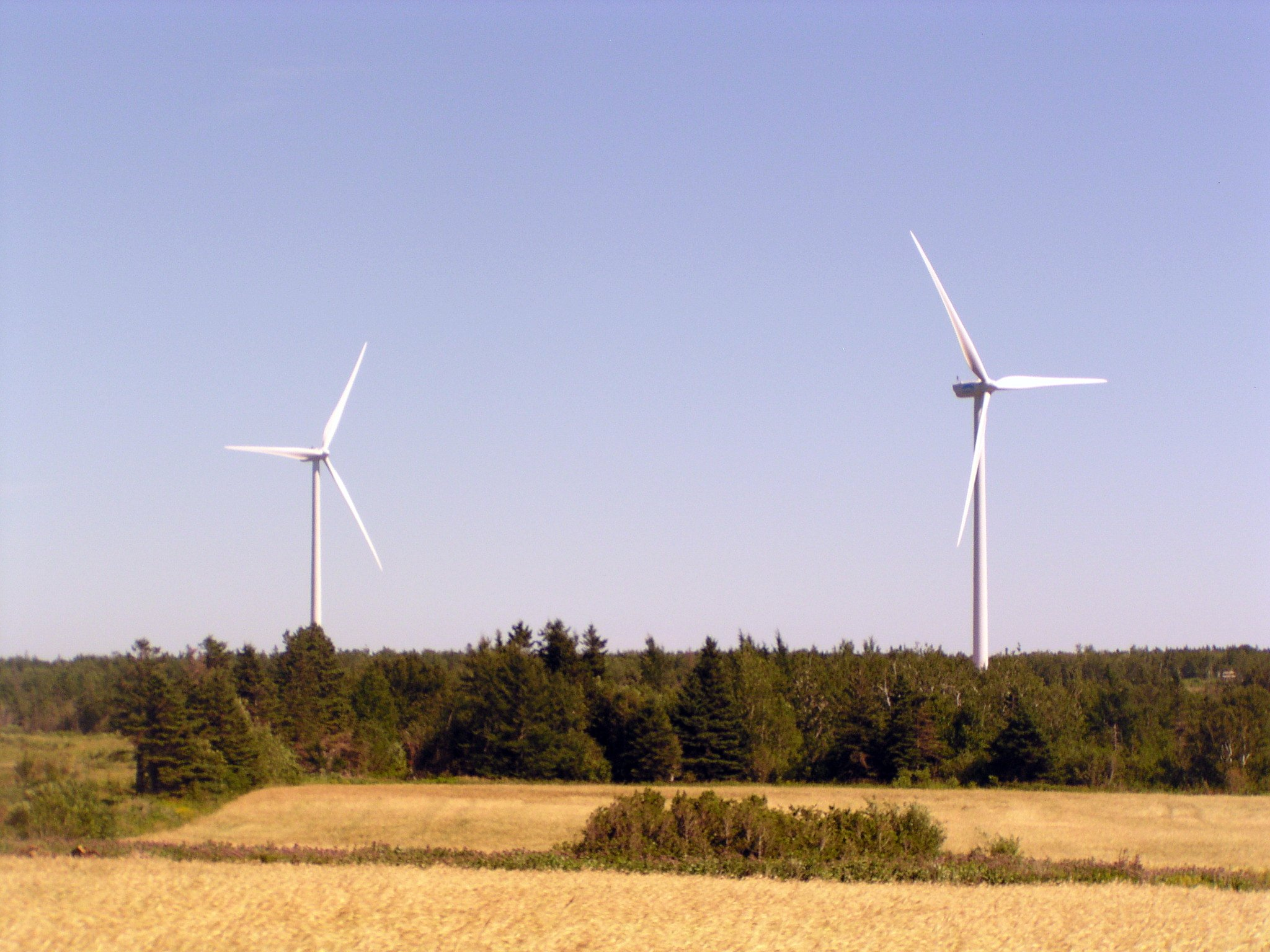
Wind turbines of the North Cape Wind Farm

== See also ==
- List of wind farms in Canada
