= List of historic places in Charlottetown =

Canadian list of historical places

Location of Charlottetown in Prince Edward Island

This article is a list of historic places in Charlottetown, Prince Edward Island entered on the Canadian Register of Historic Places, whether they are federal, provincial, or municipal.

== List of historic places ==
Name	Address	Coordinates	Government recognition (CRHP №)	Wikidata ID	Image
All Souls Chapel National Historic Site of Canada	7 All Souls' Lane; Charlottetown PE	46°14′02″N 63°07′56″W	Federal (7353), Charlottetown municipality (7355)		More images
20 All Souls' Lane / Rochford Square	20 All Souls' Lane; Charlottetown PE	46°14′03″N 63°07′55″W	Charlottetown municipality (7491)		
4 Ambrose Street	4 Ambrose Street; Charlottetown PE	46°14′03″N 63°08′11″W	Charlottetown municipality (10940)		Upload Photo
34 Ambrose Street / Chappell House	34 Ambrose Street; Charlottetown PE	46°14′07″N 63°08′14″W	Charlottetown municipality (5172)		Upload Photo
Apothecaries Hall National Historic Site of Canada	150 Queen Street; Charlottetown PE	46°14′05″N 63°07′41″W	Federal (1157), Charlottetown municipality (2931)		
Ardgour	133-135-137 Fitzroy Street; Charlottetown PE	46°14′16″N 63°07′40″W	Charlottetown municipality (2861)		Upload Photo
Ardgowan House	1 Palmers Lane; Charlottetown PE	46°15′07″N 63°07′41″W	Federal (12011)		Upload Photo
Ardgowan National Historic Site of Canada	1 Confederation Street - 2 Palmers Lane; Charlottetown PE	46°15′07″N 63°07′36″W	Federal (1160)		Upload Photo
The Bishop's Residence	45 Great George Street; Charlottetown PE	46°14′02″N 63°07′30″W	Charlottetown municipality (5973)		More images
Bonded Warehouse	91 Water Street; Charlottetown PE	46°13′57″N 63°07′27″W	Charlottetown municipality (3166)		
Brighton Beach Front Range Light	Charlottetown PE	46°13′51″N 63°08′51″W	Federal (20370)		
12 Brighton Road	12 Brighton Road; Charlottetown PE	46°14′03″N 63°08′07″W	Charlottetown municipality (4093)		Upload Photo
20 Brighton Road	20 Brighton Road; Charlottetown PE	46°14′02″N 63°08′10″W	Charlottetown municipality (4096)		Upload Photo
22 Brighton Road / Hawthorne Cottage	22 Brighton Road; Charlottetown PE	46°14′02″N 63°08′11″W	Charlottetown municipality (4089)		Upload Photo
24 Brighton Road / Hawthorn Villa	24 Brighton Road; Charlottetown PE	46°14′01″N 63°08′12″W	Charlottetown municipality (4101)		Upload Photo
26 Brighton Road / Hawthorn Villa	26 Brighton Road; Charlottetown PE	46°14′01″N 63°08′12″W	Charlottetown municipality (4104)		Upload Photo
28-30 Brighton Road	28-30 Brighton Road; Charlottetown PE	46°14′01″N 63°08′14″W	Charlottetown municipality (5167)		
36 Brighton Road	36 Brighton Road; Charlottetown PE	46°14′00″N 63°08′15″W	Charlottetown municipality (5168)		Upload Photo
90 Brighton Road	90 Brighton Road; Charlottetown PE	46°13′54″N 63°08′29″W	Charlottetown municipality (3549)		Upload Photo
94 Brighton Road	94 Brighton Road; Charlottetown PE	46°13′54″N 63°08′29″W	Charlottetown municipality (3531)		Upload Photo
102 Brighton Road	102 Brighton Road; Charlottetown PE	46°13′52″N 63°08′33″W	Charlottetown municipality (3553)		Upload Photo
Carrol House, Inns on Great George	64 Great George Street; Charlottetown PE	46°14′03″N 63°07′29″W	Charlottetown municipality (3047)		More images
Central Christian Church	215-219 Kent Street; Charlottetown PE	46°14′16″N 63°07′31″W	Charlottetown municipality (5220)		
Charlottetown City Hall National Historic Site of Canada	199 Queen Street; Charlottetown PE	46°14′01″N 63°07′37″W	Federal (4140), Charlottetown municipality (2452)		
Charlottetown CNR Station	14 Weymouth Street; Charlottetown PE	46°14′10″N 63°07′08″W	Charlottetown municipality (2855)		
Charlottetown Water Works	55 Malpeque Road; Charlottetown PE	46°16′10″N 63°09′02″W	Charlottetown municipality (5641)		Upload Photo
73 Chestnut Street	73 Chestnut Street; Charlottetown PE	46°14′17″N 63°07′49″W	Charlottetown municipality (4006)		Upload Photo
1 Churchill Avenue / William L. Cotton House	1 Churchill Avenue; Charlottetown PE	46°14′02″N 63°08′21″W	Charlottetown municipality (5130)		Upload Photo
11 Churchill Avenue / Tidmarsh House	11 Churchill Avenue; Charlottetown PE	46°14′03″N 63°08′16″W	Charlottetown municipality (5166)		Upload Photo
Honourable George Coles Building	175 Richmond Street; Charlottetown PE	46°14′08″N 63°07′31″W	Prince Edward Island (1596), Charlottetown municipality (3772)		More images
Confederation Centre of the Arts National Historic Site of Canada	145 Richmond Street; Charlottetown PE	46°14′03″N 63°07′37″W	Federal (7735)		
Customs House	40-42 Great George Street; Charlottetown PE	46°14′01″N 63°07′27″W	Prince Edward Island (1600), Charlottetown municipality (3040)		More images
Dalton Hall / University of Prince Edward Island	550 University Avenue; Charlottetown PE	46°15′25″N 63°08′30″W	Charlottetown municipality (5898)		
Dogherty Farm Grove	Brackley Point Road; Charlottetown PE	46°16′32″N 63°07′55″W	Charlottetown municipality (7484)		Upload Photo
12-14 Dorchester Street	12-14 Dorchester Street; Charlottetown PE	46°13′53″N 63°07′42″W	Charlottetown municipality (3600)		Upload Photo
20-22 Dorchester Street	20-22 Dorchester Street; Charlottetown PE	46°13′53″N 63°07′41″W	Charlottetown municipality (3042)		Upload Photo
26-28 Dorchester Street	26-28 Dorchester Street; Charlottetown PE	46°13′53″N 63°07′40″W	Charlottetown municipality (3041)		Upload Photo
55-57 Dorchester Street	55-57 Dorchester Street; Charlottetown PE	46°13′57″N 63°07′37″W	Charlottetown municipality (6214)		Upload Photo
75-77 Dorchester Street	75-77 Dorchester Street; Charlottetown PE	46°13′58″N 63°07′35″W	Charlottetown municipality (3044)		Upload Photo
162 Dorchester Street	162 Dorchester Street; Charlottetown PE	46°14′06″N 63°07′20″W	Charlottetown municipality (2432)		Upload Photo
169-171 Dorchester Street	169-171 Dorchester Street; Charlottetown PE	46°14′07″N 63°07′20″W	Charlottetown municipality (5434)		Upload Photo
179 Dorchester Street	179 Dorchester Street; Charlottetown PE	46°14′07″N 63°07′20″W	Charlottetown municipality (6117)		Upload Photo
181 Dorchester Street	181 Dorchester Street; Charlottetown PE	46°14′08″N 63°07′19″W	Charlottetown municipality (6134)		Upload Photo
187-189 Dorchester Street	187-189 Dorchester Street; Charlottetown PE	46°14′08″N 63°07′18″W	Charlottetown municipality (6165)		Upload Photo
208 Dorchester Street	208 Dorchester Street; Charlottetown PE	46°14′10″N 63°07′15″W	Charlottetown municipality (6408)		Upload Photo
J.H. Downe House, Inns on Great George	123 Dorchester Street; Charlottetown PE	46°14′03″N 63°07′26″W	Charlottetown municipality (3161)		Upload Photo
The Duchess of Kent Inn	218 Kent Street; Charlottetown PE	46°14′16″N 63°07′30″W	Charlottetown municipality (3633)		Upload Photo
Dundas Terrace	2-6 Water Street; Charlottetown PE	46°13′48″N 63°07′40″W	Federal (7412), Charlottetown municipality (3285)		
8 Euston Street	8 Euston Street; Charlottetown PE	46°14′05″N 63°08′03″W	Charlottetown municipality (6722)		Upload Photo
20 Euston Street	20 Euston Street; Charlottetown PE	46°14′07″N 63°08′01″W	Charlottetown municipality (6011)		
23 Euston Street	23 Euston Street; Charlottetown PE	46°14′08″N 63°08′01″W	Charlottetown municipality (7370)		Upload Photo
26 Euston Street	26 Euston Street; Charlottetown PE	46°14′07″N 63°07′58″W	Charlottetown municipality (6717)		Upload Photo
55-57 Euston Street	55-57 Euston Street; Charlottetown PE	46°14′10″N 63°07′57″W	Charlottetown municipality (3952)		Upload Photo
76 Euston Street	76 Euston Street; Charlottetown PE	46°14′11″N 63°07′56″W	Charlottetown municipality (6733)		Upload Photo
80 Euston Street	80 Euston Street; Charlottetown PE	46°14′11″N 63°07′54″W	Charlottetown municipality (3946)		Upload Photo
85 Euston Street	85 Euston Street; Charlottetown PE	46°14′12″N 63°07′54″W	Charlottetown municipality (11240)		Upload Photo
149 Euston Street	149 Euston Street; Charlottetown PE	46°14′18″N 63°07′45″W	Charlottetown municipality (11231)		Upload Photo
155 Euston Street	155 Euston Street; Charlottetown PE	46°14′18″N 63°07′44″W	Charlottetown municipality (3362)		Upload Photo
177 Euston Street	177 Euston Street; Charlottetown PE	46°14′21″N 63°07′40″W	Charlottetown municipality (3916)		Upload Photo
185 Euston Street	185 Euston Street; Charlottetown PE	46°14′21″N 63°07′39″W	Charlottetown municipality (3944)		Upload Photo
201-203 Euston Street	201-203 Euston Street; Charlottetown PE	46°14′22″N 63°07′38″W	Charlottetown municipality (6423)		Upload Photo
202-204 Euston Street	202-204 Euston Street; Charlottetown PE	46°14′22″N 63°07′37″W	Charlottetown municipality (3036)		Upload Photo
271-273 Euston Street	271-273 Euston Street; Charlottetown PE	46°14′29″N 63°07′27″W	Charlottetown municipality (7360)		Upload Photo
278 Euston Street	278 Euston Street; Charlottetown PE	46°14′29″N 63°07′26″W	Charlottetown municipality (4020)		Upload Photo
283-285 Euston Street	283-285 Euston Street; Charlottetown PE	46°14′30″N 63°07′26″W	Charlottetown municipality (4022)		Upload Photo
290 Euston Street	290 Euston Street; Charlottetown PE	46°14′29″N 63°07′25″W	Charlottetown municipality (6425)		Upload Photo
291 Euston Street	291 Euston Street; Charlottetown PE	46°14′30″N 63°07′25″W	Charlottetown municipality (4026)		Upload Photo
299 Euston Street	299 Euston Street; Charlottetown PE	46°14′31″N 63°07′24″W	Charlottetown municipality (3037)		Upload Photo
305 Euston Street	305 Euston Street; Charlottetown PE	46°14′32″N 63°07′23″W	Charlottetown municipality (6424)		Upload Photo
306 Euston Street	306 Euston Street; Charlottetown PE	46°14′32″N 63°07′22″W	Charlottetown municipality (4005)		Upload Photo
Fairholm National Historic Site of Canada	230 Prince Street; Charlottetown PE	46°14′17″N 63°07′38″W	Federal (1138), Charlottetown municipality (3847)		
13 Fitzroy Street	13 Fitzroy Street; Charlottetown PE	46°14′02″N 63°08′02″W	Charlottetown municipality (5861)		Upload Photo
15 Fitzroy Street	15 Fitzroy Street; Charlottetown PE	46°14′02″N 63°08′02″W	Charlottetown municipality (3883)		Upload Photo
25 Fitzroy Street	25 Fitzroy Street; Charlottetown PE	46°14′04″N 63°07′58″W	Charlottetown municipality (3889)		Upload Photo
29 Fitzroy Street / Bellview	29 Fitzroy Street; Charlottetown PE	46°14′05″N 63°07′57″W	Charlottetown municipality (6746)		Upload Photo
45 Fitzroy Street / Fitzroy Hall	45 Fitzroy Street; Charlottetown PE	46°14′07″N 63°07′54″W	Charlottetown municipality (3850)		Upload Photo
49-51 Fitzroy Street / The Shipwright Inn	49-51 Fitzroy Street; Charlottetown PE	46°14′08″N 63°07′52″W	Charlottetown municipality (3879)		Upload Photo
53 Fitzroy Street	53 Fitzroy Street; Charlottetown PE	46°14′09″N 63°07′52″W	Charlottetown municipality (3858)		Upload Photo
55 Fitzroy Street	55 Fitzroy Street; Charlottetown PE	46°14′09″N 63°07′51″W	Charlottetown municipality (3860)		Upload Photo
84 Fitzroy Street / G.A.W. Robertson House	84 Fitzroy Street; Charlottetown PE	46°14′11″N 63°07′47″W	Charlottetown municipality (7390)		
86 Fitzroy Street	86 Fitzroy Street; Charlottetown PE	46°14′11″N 63°07′47″W	Charlottetown municipality (3890)		
127-129 Fitzroy Street	127-129 Fitzroy Street; Charlottetown PE	46°14′15″N 63°07′41″W	Charlottetown municipality (2924)		Upload Photo
204 Fitzroy Street	204 Fitzroy Street; Charlottetown PE	46°14′23″N 63°07′28″W	Charlottetown municipality (6419)		Upload Photo
234-236 Fitzroy Street	234-236 Fitzroy Street; Charlottetown PE	46°14′25″N 63°07′24″W	Charlottetown municipality (6418)		Upload Photo
253-255 Fitzroy Street	253-255 Fitzroy Street; Charlottetown PE	46°14′28″N 63°07′22″W	Charlottetown municipality (10928)		Upload Photo
286-288 Fitzroy Street	286-288 Fitzroy Street; Charlottetown PE	46°14′29″N 63°07′17″W	Charlottetown municipality (3887)		Upload Photo
290 Fitzroy Street	290 Fitzroy Street; Charlottetown PE	46°14′30″N 63°07′17″W	Charlottetown municipality (3880)		Upload Photo
304 Fitzroy Street	304 Fitzroy Street; Charlottetown PE	46°14′32″N 63°07′13″W	Charlottetown municipality (6417)		Upload Photo
306 Fitzroy Street	306 Fitzroy Street; Charlottetown PE	46°14′32″N 63°07′13″W	Charlottetown municipality (6416)		Upload Photo
312 Fitzroy Street	312 Fitzroy Street; Charlottetown PE	46°14′33″N 63°07′12″W	Charlottetown municipality (3951)		Upload Photo
The Gahan House Brewery, Pub, and Mercantile	124-126 Sydney Street; Charlottetown PE	46°14′01″N 63°07′34″W	Charlottetown municipality (2928)		Upload Photo
Gainsford House	102-104 Water Street; Charlottetown PE	46°13′58″N 63°07′25″W	Charlottetown municipality (3197)		Upload Photo
Gillis House, Inns on Great George	48 Great George Street; Charlottetown PE	46°14′01″N 63°07′27″W	Charlottetown municipality (2683)		Upload Photo
Government House National Historic Site of Canada	1 Government Drive; Charlottetown PE	46°13′53″N 63°08′06″W	Federal (13273), Prince Edward Island (1607)		More images
1 Grafton Street / Caroma Lodge	1 Grafton Street; Charlottetown PE	46°13′55″N 63°07′56″W	Charlottetown municipality (5131)		Upload Photo
5-7 Grafton Street	5-7 Grafton Street; Charlottetown PE	46°13′56″N 63°07′55″W	Charlottetown municipality (6470)		Upload Photo
15 Grafton Street / John Marshall Hunter House	15 Grafton Street; Charlottetown PE	46°13′57″N 63°07′53″W	Charlottetown municipality (6598)		Upload Photo
35 Grafton Street	35 Grafton Street; Charlottetown PE	46°13′59″N 63°07′49″W	Charlottetown municipality (5512)		Upload Photo
119-121 Grafton Street	119-121 Grafton Street; Charlottetown PE	46°14′06″N 63°07′39″W	Charlottetown municipality (5975)		Upload Photo
127 Grafton Street	127 Grafton Street; Charlottetown PE	46°14′07″N 63°07′38″W	Charlottetown municipality (5979)		Upload Photo
131 Grafton Street	131 Grafton Street; Charlottetown PE	46°14′07″N 63°07′37″W	Charlottetown municipality (5981)		Upload Photo
286 Grafton Street	286 Grafton Street; Charlottetown PE	46°14′19″N 63°07′16″W	Charlottetown municipality (10836)		Upload Photo
288 Grafton Street	288 Grafton Street; Charlottetown PE	46°14′20″N 63°07′16″W	Charlottetown municipality (10839)		Upload Photo
272 Grafton Street	272 Grafton Street; Charlottetown PE	46°14′18″N 63°07′18″W	Charlottetown municipality (7219)		Upload Photo
290-292 Grafton Street / The Seller House	290-292 Grafton Street; Charlottetown PE	46°14′20″N 63°07′15″W	Charlottetown municipality (7216)		Upload Photo
296-298 Grafton Street / Cumberland Cottage	296-298 Grafton Street; Charlottetown PE	46°14′20″N 63°07′15″W	Charlottetown municipality (5438)		Upload Photo
Great George Street Historic District National Historic Site of Canada	Great George Street; Charlottetown PE	46°14′01″N 63°07′28″W	Federal (15381)		
76-88 Great George Street / Heartz-O'Halloran Row	76-88 Great George Street; Charlottetown PE	46°14′04″N 63°07′30″W	Charlottetown municipality (5906)		More images
141-143 Great George Street	141-143 Great George Street; Charlottetown PE	46°14′09″N 63°07′38″W	Charlottetown municipality (3522)		Upload Photo
Haviland Club	2 Haviland Street; Charlottetown PE	46°13′50″N 63°07′40″W	Charlottetown municipality (2454)		Upload Photo
10-12 Haviland Street	10-12 Haviland Street; Charlottetown PE	46°13′51″N 63°07′42″W	Charlottetown municipality (2805)		Upload Photo
18-20 Haviland Street	18-20 Haviland Street; Charlottetown PE	46°13′52″N 63°07′43″W	Charlottetown municipality (2716)		Upload Photo
Heartz Hall	400 St. Peters Road; Charlottetown PE	46°16′36″N 63°06′14″W	Charlottetown municipality (3682)		Upload Photo
33 Hensley Street	33 Hensley Street; Charlottetown PE	46°14′12″N 63°07′26″W	Charlottetown municipality (6437)		Upload Photo
Hillhurst Inn	181 Fitzroy Street; Charlottetown PE	46°14′20″N 63°07′34″W	Charlottetown municipality (2771)		Upload Photo
15 Hillsborough Street	15 Hillsborough Street; Charlottetown PE	46°14′06″N 63°07′15″W	Charlottetown municipality (6188)		Upload Photo
25 Hillsborough Street	25 Hillsborough Street; Charlottetown PE	46°14′07″N 63°07′16″W	Charlottetown municipality (6172)		Upload Photo
31 Hillsborough Street	31 Hillsborough Street; Charlottetown PE	46°14′07″N 63°07′16″W	Charlottetown municipality (6189)		Upload Photo
42-44 Hillsborough Street / Spencer Wyatt House	42-44 Hillsborough Street; Charlottetown PE	46°14′09″N 63°07′17″W	Charlottetown municipality (5698)		Upload Photo
67 Hillsborough Street	67 Hillsborough Street; Charlottetown PE	46°14′11″N 63°07′20″W	Charlottetown municipality (6305)		Upload Photo
75 Hillsborough Street	75 Hillsborough Street; Charlottetown PE	46°14′11″N 63°07′21″W	Charlottetown municipality (3612)		Upload Photo
79 Hillsborough Street	79 Hillsborough Street; Charlottetown PE	46°14′11″N 63°07′21″W	Charlottetown municipality (3614)		Upload Photo
89 Hillsborough Street	89 Hillsborough Street; Charlottetown PE	46°14′12″N 63°07′22″W	Charlottetown municipality (3775)		Upload Photo
92-94 Hillsborough Street	92-94 Hillsborough Street; Charlottetown PE	46°14′13″N 63°07′22″W	Charlottetown municipality (6784)		Upload Photo
97-99 Hillsborough Street	97-99 Hillsborough Street; Charlottetown PE	46°14′13″N 63°07′24″W	Charlottetown municipality (7399)		Upload Photo
105 Hillsborough Street	105 Hillsborough Street; Charlottetown PE	46°14′13″N 63°07′24″W	Charlottetown municipality (3774)		Upload Photo
202 Hillsborough Street	202 Hillsborough Street; Charlottetown PE	46°14′21″N 63°07′33″W	Charlottetown municipality (6821)		Upload Photo
238-240 Hillsborough Street / The Lowe House	238-240 Hillsborough Street; Charlottetown PE	46°14′23″N 63°07′35″W	Charlottetown municipality (6801)		Upload Photo
Holland Grove House, Inn on the Hill	123 Fitzroy Street; Charlottetown PE	46°14′15″N 63°07′42″W	Charlottetown municipality (2925)		Upload Photo
58 Hunt Avenue / Huntington	58 Hunt Avenue; Charlottetown PE	46°15′05″N 63°08′52″W	Charlottetown municipality (5340)		Upload Photo
15 Kensington Road	15 Kensington Road; Charlottetown PE	46°14′37″N 63°07′08″W	Charlottetown municipality (7457)		Upload Photo
37 Kensington Road / Prince Edward Island Hospital	37 Kensington Road; Charlottetown PE	46°14′42″N 63°07′06″W	Charlottetown municipality (5329)		Upload Photo
46 Kensington Road / Judges' Stand	46 Kensington Road; Charlottetown PE	46°14′45″N 63°07′04″W	Charlottetown municipality (5508)		Upload Photo
2 Kent Street / Beaconsfield	2 Kent Street; Charlottetown PE	46°13′55″N 63°08′00″W	Charlottetown municipality (5116)		
12 Kent Street	12 Kent Street; Charlottetown PE	46°13′58″N 63°07′58″W	Charlottetown municipality (14261)		Upload Photo
34 Kent Street	34 Kent Street; Charlottetown PE	46°14′00″N 63°07′55″W	Charlottetown municipality (4486)		Upload Photo
60-62 Kent Street	60-62 Kent Street; Charlottetown PE	46°14′02″N 63°07′52″W	Charlottetown municipality (6744)		Upload Photo
90-96 Kent Street / Kent House	90-96 Kent Street; Charlottetown PE	46°14′05″N 63°07′47″W	Charlottetown municipality (5199)		Upload Photo
137-139 Kent Street	137-139 Kent Street; Charlottetown PE	46°14′10″N 63°07′42″W	Charlottetown municipality (5998)		Upload Photo
181 Kent Street / Dr. George Carruthers' House	181 Kent Street; Charlottetown PE	46°14′13″N 63°07′35″W	Charlottetown municipality (5164)		Upload Photo
185-187 Kent Street	185-187 Kent Street; Charlottetown PE	46°14′15″N 63°07′34″W	Charlottetown municipality (6427)		Upload Photo
205 Kent Street	205 Kent Street; Charlottetown PE	46°14′16″N 63°07′32″W	Charlottetown municipality (7116)		Upload Photo
221-223 Kent Street	221-223 Kent Street; Charlottetown PE	46°14′17″N 63°07′30″W	Charlottetown municipality (7273)		Upload Photo
271 Kent Street / John Whear House	271 Kent Street; Charlottetown PE	46°14′21″N 63°07′22″W	Charlottetown municipality (5231)		Upload Photo
275 Kent Street	275 Kent Street; Charlottetown PE	46°14′22″N 63°07′22″W	Charlottetown municipality (7156)		Upload Photo
281 Kent Street	281 Kent Street; Charlottetown PE	46°14′23″N 63°07′21″W	Charlottetown municipality (7205)		Upload Photo
57-59 King Street	57-59 King Street; Charlottetown PE	46°13′55″N 63°07′35″W	Charlottetown municipality (5876)		Upload Photo
61-63 King Street	61-63 King Street; Charlottetown PE	46°13′55″N 63°07′34″W	Charlottetown municipality (3039)		Upload Photo
100 King Street	100 King Street; Charlottetown PE	46°13′58″N 63°07′29″W	Charlottetown municipality (3199)		Upload Photo
129-131 King Street	129-131 King Street; Charlottetown PE	46°14′01″N 63°07′25″W	Charlottetown municipality (10883)		
139 King Street	139 King Street; Charlottetown PE	46°14′02″N 63°07′24″W	Charlottetown municipality (3335)		Upload Photo
143-145 King Street	143-147 King Street; Charlottetown PE	46°14′02″N 63°07′23″W	Charlottetown municipality (2760)		Upload Photo
147 King Street / 144 Dorchester Street	147 King Street / 144 Dorchester Street; Charlottetown PE	46°14′03″N 63°07′23″W	Charlottetown municipality (3124)		Upload Photo
163 King Street / Robert Clark House	163 King Street; Charlottetown PE	46°14′04″N 63°07′20″W	Charlottetown municipality (3388)		Upload Photo
171 King Street	171 King Street; Charlottetown PE	46°14′05″N 63°07′19″W	Charlottetown municipality (6110)		Upload Photo
172 King Street	172 King Street; Charlottetown PE	46°14′05″N 63°07′18″W	Charlottetown municipality (11251)		Upload Photo
175 King Street	175 King Street; Charlottetown PE	46°14′05″N 63°07′19″W	Charlottetown municipality (6113)		Upload Photo
176 King Street / Oxley House	176 King Street; Charlottetown PE	46°14′05″N 63°07′18″W	Charlottetown municipality (2645)		Upload Photo
185 King Street / Hon. John Brecken House	185 King Street; Charlottetown PE	46°14′06″N 63°07′18″W	Charlottetown municipality (3338)		Upload Photo
188-192 King Street	188-192 King Street; Charlottetown PE	46°14′06″N 63°07′16″W	Charlottetown municipality (6111)		Upload Photo
45 Lewis Point Road	45 Lewis Point Road; Charlottetown PE	46°15′08″N 63°09′51″W	Charlottetown municipality (7011)		Upload Photo
77 Lewis Point Road	77 Lewis Point Road; Charlottetown PE	46°15′01″N 63°09′41″W	Charlottetown municipality (7148)		Upload Photo
Longworth Avenue Roman Catholic Cemetery	63 Longworth Avenue; Charlottetown PE	46°14′39″N 63°07′27″W	Charlottetown municipality (6315)		Upload Photo
24-36 Longworth Avenue	24-36 Longworth Avenue; Charlottetown PE	46°14′31″N 63°07′29″W	Charlottetown municipality (6409)		Upload Photo
35 Longworth Avenue / Birchwood	35 Longworth Avenue; Charlottetown PE	46°14′31″N 63°07′30″W	Charlottetown municipality (4012)		Upload Photo
W.W. Lord House	17 Water Street; Charlottetown PE	46°13′51″N 63°07′38″W	Charlottetown municipality (2714)		Upload Photo
55 Lower Malpeque Road / Pumping Station	55 Lower Malpeque Road; Charlottetown PE	46°16′02″N 63°09′36″W	Charlottetown municipality (5614)		Upload Photo
110 Lower Malpeque Road	110 Lower Malpeque Road; Charlottetown PE	46°16′10″N 63°09′40″W	Charlottetown municipality (3768)		Upload Photo
8-10 Lower Water Street / Peake's Quay	8-10 Lower Water Street; Charlottetown PE	46°13′56″N 63°07′24″W	Charlottetown municipality (7274)		Upload Photo
21-23 MacKay Drive / Mount Edward	21-23 MacKay Drive; Charlottetown PE	46°15′14″N 63°07′32″W	Charlottetown municipality (5330)		Upload Photo
J. Angus MacLean Building / Union Bank Building	94 Great George Street; Charlottetown PE	46°15′14″N 63°07′32″W	Prince Edward Island (3825), Charlottetown municipality (3404)		
Main Building / University of Prince Edward Island	550 University Avenue; Charlottetown PE	46°15′25″N 63°08′30″W	Charlottetown municipality (5897)		
36 Maxfield Avenue / Glynwood	36 Maxfield Avenue; Charlottetown PE	46°15′48″N 63°07′26″W	Charlottetown municipality (5322)		Upload Photo
46-48 McGill Avenue / Sidmount	46-48 McGill Avenue; Charlottetown PE	46°14′09″N 63°08′27″W	Charlottetown municipality (5421)		Upload Photo
34 Mount Edward Road	34 Mount Edward Road; Charlottetown PE	46°14′58″N 63°07′33″W	Charlottetown municipality (11243)		Upload Photo
38 Mount Edward Road	38 Mount Edward Road; Charlottetown PE	46°14′59″N 63°07′33″W	Charlottetown municipality (11241)		Upload Photo
180 Mount Edward Road / Wooldridge Quarry	180 Mount Edward Road; Charlottetown PE	46°15′50″N 63°08′09″W	Charlottetown municipality (7387)		Upload Photo
115 Murchison Lane / Falconwood Site	115 Murchison Lane; Charlottetown PE	46°15′23″N 63°05′36″W	Charlottetown municipality (7481)		Upload Photo
136 Nassau Street	136 Nassau Street; Charlottetown PE	46°14′49″N 63°08′27″W	Charlottetown municipality (3043)		Upload Photo
Newlands	476 Queen Street; Charlottetown PE	46°14′46″N 63°08′20″W	Charlottetown municipality (2084)		Upload Photo
53-57 Newland Crescent / W.E. Dawson House	53-57 Newland Crescent; Charlottetown PE	46°14′46″N 63°08′15″W	Charlottetown municipality (7448)		Upload Photo
97-99 North River Road / Duff House	97-99 North River Road; Charlottetown PE	46°14′04″N 63°08′24″W	Charlottetown municipality (4047)		Upload Photo
112 North River Road / William A. Weeks House	112 North River Road; Charlottetown PE	46°14′07″N 63°08′25″W	Charlottetown municipality (5169)		Upload Photo
121 North River Road / Elmwood Heritage Inn	121 North River Road; Charlottetown PE	46°14′09″N 63°08′27″W	Charlottetown municipality (5349)		Upload Photo
122 North River Road / William Dawson House	122 North River Road; Charlottetown PE	46°14′10″N 63°08′27″W	Charlottetown municipality (5190)		Upload Photo
303-305 North River Road / Warblington	303-305 North River Road; Charlottetown PE	46°14′59″N 63°08′57″W	Charlottetown municipality (5345)		Upload Photo
Notre Dame Convent	246 Sydney Street; Charlottetown PE	46°14′12″N 63°07′16″W	Charlottetown municipality (6008)		Upload Photo
1 Oak Tree Crescent / Belmont	1 Oak Tree Crescent; Charlottetown PE	46°16′07″N 63°06′37″W	Charlottetown municipality (6555)		Upload Photo
3 Oakland Drive / Wright's Mills	3 Oakland Drive; Charlottetown PE	46°16′24″N 63°06′25″W	Charlottetown municipality (3767)		Upload Photo
Old Protestant Burying Ground	260 University Avenue; Charlottetown PE	46°14′24″N 63°07′51″W	Charlottetown municipality (5132)		Upload Photo
19 Ole King Square	19 Ole King Square; Charlottetown PE	46°14′20″N 63°07′27″W	Charlottetown municipality (5228)		Upload Photo
20 Ole King Square / King Square	20 Ole King Square; Charlottetown PE	46°14′20″N 63°07′27″W	Charlottetown municipality (7449)		Upload Photo
21 Ole King Square	21 Ole King Square; Charlottetown PE	46°14′21″N 63°07′27″W	Charlottetown municipality (5229)		Upload Photo
27 Ole King Square / Longworth House	27 Ole King Square; Charlottetown PE	46°14′21″N 63°07′26″W	Charlottetown municipality (5230)		Upload Photo
8-10-12-14 Orlebar Street / Woodlawn	8-10-12-14 Orlebar Street; Charlottetown PE	46°14′26″N 63°07′35″W	Charlottetown municipality (6469)		Upload Photo
45 Park Roadway / Prince Edward Battery	45 Park Roadway; Charlottetown PE	46°13′41″N 63°08′14″W	Charlottetown municipality (5379)		
Pavilion Hotel, Inns on Great George	58 Great George Street; Charlottetown PE	46°14′02″N 63°07′29″W	Charlottetown municipality (3045)		
Peake-Carvell Building	23-25 Queen Street; Charlottetown PE	46°13′54″N 63°07′30″W	Charlottetown municipality (3287)		Upload Photo
Peake's Wharf Complex	1, 3, and 5 Water Street; Charlottetown PE	46°13′54″N 63°07′22″W	Charlottetown municipality (3399)		
Perkins House, Inns on Great George	62 Great George Street; Charlottetown PE	46°14′03″N 63°07′28″W	Charlottetown municipality (3046)		
Phoenix Building	73 Queen Street; Charlottetown PE	46°13′58″N 63°07′35″W	Charlottetown municipality (3170)		Upload Photo
15 Pownal Street	15 Pownal Street; Charlottetown PE	46°13′52″N 63°07′36″W	Charlottetown municipality (2783)		Upload Photo
17 Pownal Street	17 Pownal Street; Charlottetown PE	46°13′53″N 63°07′37″W	Charlottetown municipality (2799)		Upload Photo
28-30 Pownal Street	28-30 Pownal Street; Charlottetown PE	46°13′54″N 63°07′37″W	Charlottetown municipality (6597)		Upload Photo
32 Pownal Street	32 Pownal Street; Charlottetown PE	46°13′54″N 63°07′38″W	Charlottetown municipality (2363)		Upload Photo
38-44 Pownal Street / Pownal Street Bakery	38-44 Pownal Street; Charlottetown PE	46°13′54″N 63°07′38″W	Charlottetown municipality (6582)		Upload Photo
49 Pownal Street	49 Pownal Street; Charlottetown PE	46°13′55″N 63°07′40″W	Charlottetown municipality (6414)		Upload Photo
60 Pownal Street	60 Pownal Street; Charlottetown PE	46°13′56″N 63°07′40″W	Charlottetown municipality (2927)		Upload Photo
93 Pownal Street / The Cadden-Coyle House	93 Pownal Street; Charlottetown PE	46°13′58″N 63°07′44″W	Charlottetown municipality (7207)		Upload Photo
129 Pownal Street / Pownal House	129 Pownal Street; Charlottetown PE	46°14′01″N 63°07′48″W	Charlottetown municipality (5193)		Upload Photo
140 Pownal Street / Cameron House	140 Pownal Street; Charlottetown PE	46°14′02″N 63°07′48″W	Charlottetown municipality (5699)		Upload Photo
222 Pownal Street	222 Pownal Street; Charlottetown PE	46°14′08″N 63°07′55″W	Charlottetown municipality (5219)		Upload Photo
238 Pownal Street / Carmichael-MacKieson House	238 Pownal Street; Charlottetown PE	46°14′09″N 63°07′57″W	Charlottetown municipality (3770)		Upload Photo
241-243 Pownal Street	241-243 Pownal Street; Charlottetown PE	46°14′09″N 63°07′58″W	Charlottetown municipality (5218)		Upload Photo
Prince Edward Home Property	5 Brighton Road; Charlottetown PE	46°13′58″N 63°08′17″W	Charlottetown municipality (5695)		Upload Photo
15 Prince Street	15 Prince Street; Charlottetown PE	46°14′02″N 63°07′20″W	Charlottetown municipality (2929)		Upload Photo
21-23 Prince Street	21-23 Prince Street; Charlottetown PE	46°14′03″N 63°07′20″W	Charlottetown municipality (2851)		Upload Photo
26 Prince Street	26 Prince Street; Charlottetown PE	46°14′04″N 63°07′20″W	Charlottetown municipality (11180)		Upload Photo
46 Prince Street	46 Prince Street; Charlottetown PE	46°14′05″N 63°07′21″W	Charlottetown municipality (3599)		Upload Photo
47 Prince Street	47 Prince Street; Charlottetown PE	46°14′04″N 63°07′22″W	Charlottetown municipality (2496)		Upload Photo
48 Prince Street	48 Prince Street; Charlottetown PE	46°14′05″N 63°07′21″W	Charlottetown municipality (5781)		Upload Photo
51 Prince Street	51 Prince Street; Charlottetown PE	46°14′05″N 63°07′23″W	Charlottetown municipality (6415)		Upload Photo
62 Prince Street / Thomas Alley House	62 Prince Street; Charlottetown PE	46°14′06″N 63°07′22″W	Charlottetown municipality (6413)		Upload Photo
96-98 Prince Street / H.H. Houle House	96-98 Prince Street; Charlottetown PE	46°14′09″N 63°07′26″W	Charlottetown municipality (6410)		Upload Photo
100 Prince Street	100 Prince Street; Charlottetown PE	46°14′09″N 63°07′27″W	Charlottetown municipality (3773)		Upload Photo
112-114 Prince Street	112-114 Prince Street; Charlottetown PE	46°14′10″N 63°07′28″W	Charlottetown municipality (6321)		Upload Photo
120 Prince Street	120 Prince Street; Charlottetown PE	46°14′10″N 63°07′28″W	Charlottetown municipality (3776)		Upload Photo
124 Prince Street	124 Prince Street; Charlottetown PE	46°14′11″N 63°07′29″W	Charlottetown municipality (3777)		Upload Photo
186 Prince Street / Rev. Dr. Richard Johnson House	186 Prince Street; Charlottetown PE	46°14′15″N 63°07′35″W	Charlottetown municipality (6421)		Upload Photo
213 Prince Street	213 Prince Street; Charlottetown PE	46°14′16″N 63°07′38″W	Charlottetown municipality (10873)		Upload Photo
235-237 Prince Street / MacLennan House	235-237 Prince Street; Charlottetown PE	46°14′18″N 63°07′40″W	Charlottetown municipality (2516)		
241 Prince Street / James Paton House	241 Prince Street; Charlottetown PE	46°14′18″N 63°07′41″W	Charlottetown municipality (6306)		More images
247-249 Prince Street	247-249 Prince Street; Charlottetown PE	46°14′19″N 63°07′42″W	Charlottetown municipality (2630)		Upload Photo
Province House	165 Richmond Street; Charlottetown PE	46°14′05″N 63°07′33″W	Federal (5441), Prince Edward Island (1617), Charlottetown municipality (4009)		
40 Queen Street	40 Queen Street; Charlottetown PE	46°13′57″N 63°07′30″W	Charlottetown municipality (5920)		Upload Photo
43 Queen Street	43 Queen Street; Charlottetown PE	46°13′56″N 63°07′31″W	Charlottetown municipality (6004)		
45 Queen Street / Welsh and Owen Building	45 Queen Street; Charlottetown PE	46°13′56″N 63°07′31″W	Charlottetown municipality (5986)		Upload Photo
52 Queen Street / 87 King Street	52 Queen Street / 87 King Street; Charlottetown PE	46°13′57″N 63°07′31″W	Charlottetown municipality (3052)		Upload Photo
57 Queen Street	57 Queen Street; Charlottetown PE	46°13′57″N 63°07′33″W	Charlottetown municipality (2449)		Upload Photo
72-74 Queen Street	72-74 Queen Street; Charlottetown PE	46°13′59″N 63°07′33″W	Charlottetown municipality (1973)		Upload Photo
75 Queen Street, Connolly Block	75 Queen Street; Charlottetown PE	46°13′58″N 63°07′35″W	Charlottetown municipality (3141)		
86-90 Queen Street	86-90 Queen Street; Charlottetown PE	46°14′00″N 63°07′34″W	Charlottetown municipality (4057)		Upload Photo
92 Queen Street	92 Queen Street; Charlottetown PE	46°14′00″N 63°07′35″W	Charlottetown municipality (5883)		Upload Photo
94 Queen Street	94 Queen Street; Charlottetown PE	46°14′01″N 63°07′35″W	Charlottetown municipality (3422)		Upload Photo
96 Queen Street	96 Queen Street; Charlottetown PE	46°14′01″N 63°07′36″W	Charlottetown municipality (3421)		Upload Photo
100-102 Queen Street	100-102 Queen Street; Charlottetown PE	46°14′01″N 63°07′36″W	Charlottetown municipality (3198)		Upload Photo
110 Queen Street, Stamper Block	110 Queen Street / 126 Richmond Street; Charlottetown PE	46°14′01″N 63°07′36″W	Charlottetown municipality (3174)		
137-139 Queen Street	137-139 Queen Street; Charlottetown PE	46°14′03″N 63°07′41″W	Charlottetown municipality (3662)		Upload Photo
156 Queen Street	156 Queen Street; Charlottetown PE	46°14′05″N 63°07′42″W	Charlottetown municipality (3630)		Upload Photo
247-249-251 Queen Street / Charles Heartz House	247-249-251 Queen Street; Charlottetown PE	46°14′11″N 63°07′51″W	Charlottetown municipality (5217)		Upload Photo
269 Queen Street / Westmoreland Bayfield House	269 Queen Street; Charlottetown PE	46°14′12″N 63°07′52″W	Charlottetown municipality (5206)		Upload Photo
Ravenwood House	Charlottetown PE	46°14′56″N 63°07′41″W	Federal (10848)		Upload Photo
15 Richmond Street	15 Richmond Street; Charlottetown PE	46°13′53″N 63°07′51″W	Charlottetown municipality (11225)		Upload Photo
60 Richmond Street / Connaught Square	60 Richmond Street; Charlottetown PE	46°13′56″N 63°07′45″W	Charlottetown municipality (7386)		Upload Photo
126-128 Richmond Street / Brown Block	126-128 Richmond Street; Charlottetown PE	46°14′02″N 63°07′36″W	Charlottetown municipality (5840)		Upload Photo
132 Richmond Street / Brown Block	132 Richmond Street; Charlottetown PE	46°14′02″N 63°07′36″W	Charlottetown municipality (5841)		Upload Photo
134 Richmond Street / Brown Block	134 Richmond Street; Charlottetown PE	46°14′02″N 63°07′35″W	Charlottetown municipality (5843)		Upload Photo
138-142 Richmond Street, Cameron Block	138-142 Richmond Street; Charlottetown PE	46°14′02″N 63°07′35″W	Charlottetown municipality (3137)		Upload Photo
144-150 Richmond Street, Cameron Block	144-150 Richmond Street; Charlottetown PE	46°14′02″N 63°07′35″W	Charlottetown municipality (3140)		Upload Photo
154-156 Richmond Street, Morris Building	154-156 Richmond Street; Charlottetown PE	46°14′03″N 63°07′34″W	Charlottetown municipality (3165)		
160-164 Richmond Street, Newson Block	160-164 Richmond Street; Charlottetown PE	46°14′03″N 63°07′34″W	Charlottetown municipality (3168)		Upload Photo
215-217 Richmond Street	215-217 Richmond Street; Charlottetown PE	46°14′10″N 63°07′25″W	Charlottetown municipality (7311)		Upload Photo
227 Richmond Street	227 Richmond Street; Charlottetown PE	46°14′10″N 63°07′24″W	Charlottetown municipality (3771)		Upload Photo
243 Richmond Street	243 Richmond Street; Charlottetown PE	46°14′11″N 63°07′22″W	Charlottetown municipality (7301)		Upload Photo
257-259 Richmond Street	257-259 Richmond Street; Charlottetown PE	46°14′12″N 63°07′20″W	Charlottetown municipality (6312)		Upload Photo
260 Richmond Street / Hillsborough Square	260 Richmond Street; Charlottetown PE	46°14′12″N 63°07′19″W	Charlottetown municipality (7363)		Upload Photo
261-263 Richmond Street	261-263 Richmond Street; Charlottetown PE	46°14′13″N 63°07′19″W	Charlottetown municipality (6313)		Upload Photo
265 Richmond Street	265 Richmond Street; Charlottetown PE	46°14′13″N 63°07′19″W	Charlottetown municipality (6311)		Upload Photo
267 Richmond Street / John MacMillan House	267 Richmond Street; Charlottetown PE	46°14′14″N 63°07′18″W	Charlottetown municipality (6309)		Upload Photo
277-279 Richmond Street	277-279 Richmond Street; Charlottetown PE	46°14′14″N 63°07′17″W	Charlottetown municipality (6308)		Upload Photo
289 Richmond Street	289 Richmond Street; Charlottetown PE	46°14′16″N 63°07′14″W	Charlottetown municipality (7294)		Upload Photo
293 Richmond Street	293 Richmond Street; Charlottetown PE	46°14′16″N 63°07′14″W	Charlottetown municipality (5226)		Upload Photo
294 Richmond Street / E.J. Hodgson House	294 Richmond Street; Charlottetown PE	46°14′16″N 63°07′14″W	Charlottetown municipality (6468)		Upload Photo
295 Richmond Street	295 Richmond Street; Charlottetown PE	46°14′17″N 63°07′13″W	Charlottetown municipality (7292)		Upload Photo
61 Rochford Street / William Fraser House	61 Rochford Street; Charlottetown PE	46°13′58″N 63°07′54″W	Charlottetown municipality (5173)		Upload Photo
126 Rochford Street / Aeneas A. MacDonald House	126 Rochford Street; Charlottetown PE	46°14′04″N 63°08′01″W	Charlottetown municipality (5175)		Upload Photo
137 Rochford Street	137 Rochford Street; Charlottetown PE	46°14′04″N 63°08′02″W	Charlottetown municipality (6753)		Upload Photo
140 Rochford Street / Frogmore	140 Rochford Street; Charlottetown PE	46°14′05″N 63°08′02″W	Charlottetown municipality (5194)		Upload Photo
Rogers Hardware Company Warehouse	70 Grafton Street; Charlottetown PE	46°14′02″N 63°07′43″W	Charlottetown municipality (6010)		Upload Photo
Royalty Oaks Natural Area	1 Oak Tree Crescent; Charlottetown PE	46°16′07″N 63°06′37″W	Charlottetown municipality (6167)		Upload Photo
St. Dunstan's Roman Catholic Cathedral / Basilica National Historic Site of Canada	65 Great George Street; Charlottetown PE	46°14′02″N 63°07′29″W	Federal (4445), Charlottetown municipality (5964)		More images
St. Paul's Anglican Church	101 Prince Street; Charlottetown PE	46°14′09″N 63°07′28″W	Charlottetown municipality (5208)		
St. Paul's Anglican Church Hall	101 Prince Street; Charlottetown PE	46°14′09″N 63°07′28″W	Charlottetown municipality (5204)		
St. Paul's Anglican Church Rectory	197 Prince Street; Charlottetown PE	46°14′09″N 63°07′28″W	Charlottetown municipality (5696)		Upload Photo
37-39 St. Peters Road	37-39 St. Peters Road; Charlottetown PE	46°14′54″N 63°07′22″W	Charlottetown municipality (3769)		Upload Photo
123 St. Peters Road / St. Peters Anglican Cemetery	123 St. Peters Road; Charlottetown PE	46°15′26″N 63°07′12″W	Charlottetown municipality (7454)		Upload Photo
311 St. Peters Road / Norwood	311 St. Peters Road; Charlottetown PE	46°16′19″N 63°06′37″W	Charlottetown municipality (7091)		Upload Photo
Spillett House	157 Weymouth Street; Charlottetown PE	46°14′19″N 63°07′22″W	Charlottetown municipality (2936)		Upload Photo
209 Spring Park Road / George H. Simmons' House	209 Spring Park Road; Charlottetown PE	46°14′34″N 63°08′28″W	Charlottetown municipality (7453)		Upload Photo
The Stone Park Farm Site	Pope Avenue; Charlottetown PE	46°15′49″N 63°07′13″W	Charlottetown municipality (11229)		Upload Photo
59-61 Summer Street / The Cedars	59-61 Summer Street; Charlottetown PE	46°14′41″N 63°07′49″W	Charlottetown municipality (6477)		Upload Photo
6-8 Sunset Drive / Edgecrest	6-8 Sunset Drive; Charlottetown PE	46°14′49″N 63°08′55″W	Charlottetown municipality (5359)		Upload Photo
9-11 Sydney Street / Williams Douse House	9-11 Sydney Street; Charlottetown PE	46°13′51″N 63°07′50″W	Charlottetown municipality (3402)		Upload Photo
15-17 Sydney Street	15-17 Sydney Street; Charlottetown PE	46°13′52″N 63°07′49″W	Charlottetown municipality (3409)		Upload Photo
48-50 Sydney Street	48-50 Sydney Street; Charlottetown PE	46°13′54″N 63°07′44″W	Charlottetown municipality (6217)		Upload Photo
52 Sydney Street	52 Sydney Street; Charlottetown PE	46°13′54″N 63°07′43″W	Charlottetown municipality (6219)		Upload Photo
58-60 Sydney Street	58-60 Sydney Street; Charlottetown PE	46°13′55″N 63°07′43″W	Charlottetown municipality (6221)		Upload Photo
70 Sydney Street / 63 Pownal Street	70 Sydney Street / 63 Pownal Street; Charlottetown PE	46°13′56″N 63°07′41″W	Charlottetown municipality (3766)		
88-90 Sydney Street	88-90 Sydney Street; Charlottetown PE	46°13′58″N 63°07′38″W	Charlottetown municipality (6223)		Upload Photo
125 Sydney Street	125 Sydney Street; Charlottetown PE	46°14′01″N 63°07′34″W	Charlottetown municipality (6825)		Upload Photo
167-169 Sydney Street	167-169 Sydney Street; Charlottetown PE	46°14′05″N 63°07′28″W	Charlottetown municipality (3609)		Upload Photo
170 Sydney Street	170 Sydney Street; Charlottetown PE	46°14′05″N 63°07′27″W	Charlottetown municipality (2941)		Upload Photo
172 Sydney Street	172 Sydney Street; Charlottetown PE	46°14′05″N 63°07′27″W	Charlottetown municipality (2940)		Upload Photo
174 Sydney Street	174 Sydney Street; Charlottetown PE	46°14′05″N 63°07′26″W	Charlottetown municipality (5195)		Upload Photo
176 Sydney Street	176 Sydney Street; Charlottetown PE	46°14′06″N 63°07′26″W	Charlottetown municipality (3171)		Upload Photo
178 Sydney Street	178 Sydney Street; Charlottetown PE	46°14′05″N 63°07′26″W	Charlottetown municipality (5855)		Upload Photo
180 Sydney Street	180 Sydney Street; Charlottetown PE	46°14′06″N 63°07′26″W	Charlottetown municipality (2938)		Upload Photo
206 Sydney Street	206 Sydney Street; Charlottetown PE	46°14′08″N 63°07′22″W	Charlottetown municipality (2937)		Upload Photo
222 Sydney Street / Nelson House	222 Sydney Street; Charlottetown PE	46°14′09″N 63°07′20″W	Charlottetown municipality (7490)		Upload Photo
234 Sydney Street	234 Sydney Street; Charlottetown PE	46°14′11″N 63°07′18″W	Charlottetown municipality (2474)		Upload Photo
236-238 Sydney Street	236-238 Sydney Street; Charlottetown PE	46°14′11″N 63°07′17″W	Charlottetown municipality (6006)		Upload Photo
18 Trafalgar Street	18 Trafalgar Street; Charlottetown PE	46°14′39″N 63°08′33″W	Charlottetown municipality (3543)		Upload Photo
Trinity United Church	78 Prince Street; Charlottetown PE	46°14′07″N 63°07′24″W	Charlottetown municipality (3350)		
Trinity United Church Manse	220 Richmond Street; Charlottetown PE	46°14′09″N 63°07′24″W	Charlottetown municipality (3484)		Upload Photo
322-328 University Avenue	322-328 University Avenue; Charlottetown PE	46°14′30″N 63°07′56″W	Charlottetown municipality (7489)		Upload Photo
14 Upper Prince Street	14 Upper Prince Street; Charlottetown PE	46°14′22″N 63°07′42″W	Charlottetown municipality (11245)		Upload Photo
33 Upper Prince Street	33 Upper Prince Street; Charlottetown PE	46°14′23″N 63°07′43″W	Charlottetown municipality (7455)		Upload Photo
38-40 Upper Prince Street / Alma Cottage	38-40 Upper Prince Street; Charlottetown PE	46°14′24″N 63°07′44″W	Charlottetown municipality (7284)		Upload Photo
55 Upper Prince Street / The Ritz	55 Upper Prince Street; Charlottetown PE	46°14′25″N 63°07′45″W	Charlottetown municipality (5428)		Upload Photo
63-65 Upper Prince Street	63-65 Upper Prince Street; Charlottetown PE	46°14′26″N 63°07′46″W	Charlottetown municipality (7276)		Upload Photo
69 Upper Prince Street / The Full House	69 Upper Prince Street; Charlottetown PE	46°14′27″N 63°07′47″W	Charlottetown municipality (7281)		Upload Photo
101 Upper Prince Street / MacNeill House	101 Upper Prince Street; Charlottetown PE	46°14′34″N 63°07′51″W	Charlottetown municipality (5422)		Upload Photo
113 Upper Prince Street / McGrath Robertson House	113 Upper Prince Street; Charlottetown PE	46°14′34″N 63°07′52″W	Charlottetown municipality (5423)		Upload Photo
114 Upper Prince Street / Blanchard House	114 Upper Prince Street; Charlottetown PE	46°14′35″N 63°07′51″W	Charlottetown municipality (7275)		Upload Photo
Victoria Park	50 Park Roadway; Charlottetown PE	46°13′42″N 63°08′27″W	Charlottetown municipality (5846)		
58 Victoria Street / Sloggett House	58 Victoria Street; Charlottetown PE	46°14′13″N 63°08′05″W	Charlottetown municipality (5202)		Upload Photo
8-10 Water Street / Benjamin Davies' House	8-10 Water Street; Charlottetown PE	46°13′49″N 63°07′39″W	Charlottetown municipality (5862)		Upload Photo
18-22 Water Street	18-22 Water Street; Charlottetown PE	46°13′50″N 63°07′37″W	Charlottetown municipality (2932)		Upload Photo
24 Water Street	24 Water Street; Charlottetown PE	46°13′51″N 63°07′36″W	Charlottetown municipality (5858)		Upload Photo
27 Water Street	27 Water Street; Charlottetown PE	46°13′52″N 63°07′36″W	Charlottetown municipality (2773)		Upload Photo
49-57 Water Street	49-57 Water Street; Charlottetown PE	46°13′53″N 63°07′33″W	Charlottetown municipality (3347)		Upload Photo
50 Water Street	50 Water Street; Charlottetown PE	46°13′53″N 63°07′32″W	Charlottetown municipality (3348)		Upload Photo
90 Water Street / Batt House	90 Water Street; Charlottetown PE	46°13′57″N 63°07′27″W	Charlottetown municipality (2543)		
92-94 Water Street / Merchants Bank Building	92-94 Water Street; Charlottetown PE	46°13′57″N 63°07′26″W	Charlottetown municipality (5856)		More images
100 Water Street / Longworth House	100 Water Street; Charlottetown PE	46°13′58″N 63°07′25″W	Charlottetown municipality (5857)		Upload Photo
100.5 Water Street	100.5 Water Street; Charlottetown PE	46°13′58″N 63°07′25″W	Charlottetown municipality (5884)		Upload Photo
108 Water Street	108 Water Street; Charlottetown PE	46°13′58″N 63°07′24″W	Charlottetown municipality (3202)		Upload Photo
124 Water Street	124 Water Street; Charlottetown PE	46°14′00″N 63°07′22″W	Charlottetown municipality (10902)		
131 Water Street / Harland House	131 Water Street; Charlottetown PE	46°14′01″N 63°07′21″W	Charlottetown municipality (5860)		
140 Water Street	140 Water Street; Charlottetown PE	46°14′01″N 63°07′20″W	Charlottetown municipality (2650)		Upload Photo
178 Water Street	178 Water Street; Charlottetown PE	46°14′04″N 63°07′14″W	Charlottetown municipality (2631)		
209 Water Street	209 Water Street; Charlottetown PE	46°14′07″N 63°07′11″W	Charlottetown municipality (5864)		
Watermere / 5 Queen Elizabeth Drive	5 Queen Elizabeth Drive; Charlottetown PE	46°13′49″N 63°08′44″W	Charlottetown municipality (2738)		Upload Photo
Wellington House, Inns on Great George	68 Great George Street; Charlottetown PE	46°14′03″N 63°07′29″W	Charlottetown municipality (3049)		More images
5 West Street / Sir Louis Henry Davies' House	5 West Street; Charlottetown PE	46°13′53″N 63°07′57″W	Charlottetown municipality (5192)		Upload Photo
12 West Street	12 West Street; Charlottetown PE	46°13′54″N 63°07′56″W	Charlottetown municipality (3494)		
17 West Street / Westbourne	17 West Street; Charlottetown PE	46°13′55″N 63°07′59″W	Charlottetown municipality (5574)		Upload Photo
18 West Street / West End House	18 West Street; Charlottetown PE	46°13′56″N 63°07′59″W	Charlottetown municipality (6431)		Upload Photo
22 West Street / The Priory	22 West Street; Charlottetown PE	46°13′57″N 63°08′00″W	Charlottetown municipality (6433)		Upload Photo
58 Weymouth Street	58 Weymouth Street; Charlottetown PE	46°14′14″N 63°07′13″W	Charlottetown municipality (3038)		Upload Photo
93 Weymouth Street	93 Weymouth Street; Charlottetown PE	46°14′16″N 63°07′18″W	Charlottetown municipality (5273)		Upload Photo
101 Weymouth Street	101 Weymouth Street; Charlottetown PE	46°14′16″N 63°07′18″W	Charlottetown municipality (6000)		Upload Photo
166 Weymouth Street	166 Weymouth Street; Charlottetown PE	46°14′22″N 63°07′24″W	Charlottetown municipality (5450)		Upload Photo
Mona Wilson Building	61 McGill Avenue; Charlottetown PE	46°14′17″N 63°08′25″W	Prince Edward Island (1622)		Upload Photo
Witter Coombs House, Inns on Great George	66 Great George Street; Charlottetown PE	46°14′03″N 63°07′29″W	Charlottetown municipality (3048)		
44 York Lane	44 York Lane; Charlottetown PE	46°13′57″N 63°08′38″W	Charlottetown municipality (3632)		Upload Photo

== See also ==
- List of historic places in Queens County, Prince Edward Island
- List of historic places in Prince Edward Island
- List of National Historic Sites of Canada in Prince Edward Island
- Heritage Places Protection Act
