= List of historic places in Summerside, Prince Edward Island =

Location of Summerside in Prince Edward Island

This article is a list of historic places in Summerside, Prince Edward Island entered on the Canadian Register of Historic Places, whether they are federal, provincial, or municipal.

== List of historic places ==
Name	Address	Coordinates	Government recognition (CRHP №)	Wikidata ID	Image
Lucas Allen House	115 Spring Street; Summerside PE	46°23′43″N 63°47′20″W	Summerside municipality (15581)		Upload Photo
Stephen Baker House	189 Harvard Street; Summerside PE	46°23′42″N 63°47′12″W	Summerside municipality (15654)		Upload Photo
317 Beaver Street	317 Beaver Street; Summerside PE	46°23′59″N 63°47′28″W	Summerside municipality (8440)		Upload Photo
339 Beaver Street	339 Beaver Street; Summerside PE	46°23′57″N 63°47′32″W	Summerside municipality (9032)		Upload Photo
365 Beaver Street	365 Beaver Street; Summerside PE	46°23′57″N 63°47′36″W	Summerside municipality (15042)		Upload Photo
151 Belmont Street	151 Belmont Street; Summerside PE	46°23′36″N 63°47′08″W	Summerside municipality (15061)		Upload Photo
157 Belmont Street	157 Belmont Street; Summerside PE	46°23′36″N 63°47′09″W	Summerside municipality (15063)		Upload Photo
161 Belmont Street	161 Belmont Street; Summerside PE	46°23′36″N 63°47′10″W	Summerside municipality (15067)		Upload Photo
185 Belmont Street	185 Belmont Street; Summerside PE	46°23′36″N 63°47′14″W	Summerside municipality (10086)		Upload Photo
Bowness House	88 Central Street; Summerside PE	46°23′42″N 63°47′30″W	Summerside municipality (2497)		Upload Photo
John A. Brace House	159 Spring Street; Summerside PE	46°23′50″N 63°47′18″W	Summerside municipality (15411)		Upload Photo
Calhoun House	39 Eustane Street; Summerside PE	46°23′31″N 63°47′09″W	Summerside municipality (16237)		Upload Photo
George A. Callbeck House	210 Notre Dame Street; Summerside PE	46°23′43″N 63°47′16″W	Summerside municipality (16292)		Upload Photo
Philip Callbeck House	165 Cambridge Street; Summerside PE	46°23′39″N 63°47′09″W	Summerside municipality (16184)		Upload Photo
144 Cambridge Street	144 Cambridge Street; Summerside PE	46°23′38″N 63°47′06″W	Summerside municipality (10971)		Upload Photo
James Campbell House	270 Central Street; Summerside PE	46°24′05″N 63°47′24″W	Summerside municipality (16208)		Upload Photo
Thomas Carruthers House	136 Spring Street; Summerside PE	46°23′46″N 63°47′19″W	Summerside municipality (15531)		Upload Photo
67 Central Street	67 Central Street; Summerside PE	46°23′39″N 63°47′30″W	Summerside municipality (15081)		Upload Photo
75 Central Street	75 Central Street; Summerside PE	46°23′40″N 63°47′30″W	Summerside municipality (10125)		Upload Photo
76 Central Street	76 Central Street; Summerside PE	46°23′40″N 63°47′32″W	Summerside municipality (10081)		Upload Photo
82 Central Street	82 Central Street; Summerside PE	46°23′41″N 63°47′31″W	Summerside municipality (10122)		Upload Photo
94 Central Street	94 Central Street; Summerside PE	46°23′42″N 63°47′31″W	Summerside municipality (10121)		Upload Photo
140 Central Street	140 Central Street; Summerside PE	46°23′48″N 63°47′29″W	Summerside municipality (10124)		Upload Photo
146 Central Street	146 Central Street; Summerside PE	46°23′49″N 63°47′28″W	Summerside municipality (10123)		Upload Photo
155 Central Street	155 Central Street; Summerside PE	46°23′51″N 63°47′27″W	Summerside municipality (10975)		Upload Photo
168 Central Street	168 Central Street; Summerside PE	46°23′52″N 63°47′28″W	Summerside municipality (10085)		Upload Photo
189 Central Street	189 Central Street; Summerside PE	46°23′54″N 63°47′26″W	Summerside municipality (10083)		Upload Photo
197 Central Street	197 Central Street; Summerside PE	46°23′55″N 63°47′26″W	Summerside municipality (10082)		Upload Photo
250 Central Street	250 Central Street; Summerside PE	46°24′03″N 63°47′24″W	Summerside municipality (12543)		Upload Photo
325 Central Street	325 Central Street; Summerside PE	46°24′11″N 63°47′21″W	Summerside municipality (15101)		Upload Photo
205 Church Street	205 Church Street; Summerside PE	46°23′37″N 63°47′18″W	Summerside municipality (10076)		Upload Photo
215 Church Street	215 Church Street; Summerside PE	46°23′37″N 63°47′19″W	Summerside municipality (10120)		Upload Photo
216 Church Street	216 Church Street; Summerside PE	46°23′36″N 63°47′20″W	Summerside municipality (10119)		Upload Photo
253 Church Street	253 Church Street; Summerside PE	46°23′37″N 63°47′24″W	Summerside municipality (10118)		Upload Photo
211 Convent Street	211 Convent Street; Summerside PE	46°23′46″N 63°47′15″W	Summerside municipality (15143)		Upload Photo
221 Convent Street	221 Convent Street; Summerside PE	46°23′46″N 63°47′17″W	Summerside municipality (15145)		Upload Photo
247 Convent Street	247 Convent Street; Summerside PE	46°23′47″N 63°47′20″W	Summerside municipality (8450)		Upload Photo
Crockett-Gallant Building	281 Water Street; Summerside PE	46°23′30″N 63°47′29″W	Summerside municipality (15441)		Upload Photo
175 Duke Street	175 Duke Street; Summerside PE	46°23′56″N 63°47′40″W	Summerside municipality (10984)		Upload Photo
Mollison House	38 Eustane Street; Summerside PE	46°23′31″N 63°47′09″W	Summerside municipality (12602)		Upload Photo
Patrick Fanning House	98 Summer Street; Summerside PE	46°23′43″N 63°47′25″W	Prince Edward Island (1650), Summerside municipality (2754)		Upload Photo
203 Fitzroy Street	203 Fitzroy Street; Summerside PE	46°23′34″N 63°47′19″W	Summerside municipality (10117)		Upload Photo
279 Fitzroy Street	279 Fitzroy Street; Summerside PE	46°23′35″N 63°47′28″W	Summerside municipality (10994)		Upload Photo
Former Church of Scotland	138 Kirk Street; Summerside PE	46°23′32″N 63°47′04″W	Summerside municipality (15642)		Upload Photo
Former Summerside Post Office National Historic Site of Canada	45 Summer Street; Summerside PE	46°23′35″N 63°47′27″W	Federal (7418)		
Gorrill House	143 Granville Street; Summerside PE	46°23′46″N 63°47′12″W	Summerside municipality (15664)		Upload Photo
James Gourlie House	343 Poplar Avenue; Summerside PE	46°24′04″N 63°47′30″W	Summerside municipality (16321)		Upload Photo
Alexander Grady House	81 Granville Street; Summerside PE	46°23′38″N 63°47′16″W	Summerside municipality (15686)		Upload Photo
27 Granville Street	27 Granville Street; Summerside PE	46°23′31″N 63°47′17″W	Summerside municipality (10075)		Upload Photo
36 Granville Street	36 Granville Street; Summerside PE	46°23′33″N 63°47′18″W	Summerside municipality (10115)		Upload Photo
71 Granville Street	71 Granville Street; Summerside PE	46°23′37″N 63°47′16″W	Summerside municipality (10110)		Upload Photo
74 Granville Street	74 Granville Street; Summerside PE	46°23′37″N 63°47′16″W	Summerside municipality (10074)		Upload Photo
158 Granville Street	158 Granville Street; Summerside PE	46°23′48″N 63°47′13″W	Summerside municipality (12605)		Upload Photo
Albert L. Graves House	335 Poplar Avenue; Summerside PE	46°24′04″N 63°47′28″W	Summerside municipality (16163)		Upload Photo
277 Green Street	277 Green Street; Summerside PE	46°23′54″N 63°47′21″W	Summerside municipality (10073)		Upload Photo
283 Green Street	283 Green Street; Summerside PE	46°23′54″N 63°47′23″W	Summerside municipality (10072)		Upload Photo
S.M. Hicks House	143 Spring Street; Summerside PE	46°23′47″N 63°47′18″W	Summerside municipality (15521)		Upload Photo
Holman Homestead and Garden	286 Fitzroy Street; Summerside PE	46°23′35″N 63°47′29″W	Summerside municipality (16273)		Upload Photo
Louis B. Hunt House	89 Granville Street; Summerside PE	46°23′39″N 63°47′14″W	Summerside municipality (15681)		Upload Photo
Frank Johnston House	76 Water Street; Summerside PE	46°23′25″N 63°46′52″W	Summerside municipality (15461)		Upload Photo
Lefurgey Cultural Centre	205 Prince Street; Summerside PE	46°23′39″N 63°47′17″W	Summerside municipality (4102)		Upload Photo
Nathan MacFarlane House	171 Fitzroy Street; Summerside PE	46°23′33″N 63°47′13″W	Summerside municipality (15721)		Upload Photo
MacLennan-Hunt House	193 Fitzroy Street; Summerside PE	46°23′33″N 63°47′16″W	Prince Edward Island (1593)		Upload Photo
Neil and Ada MacLeod House	228 Central Street; Summerside PE	46°24′01″N 63°47′25″W	Summerside municipality (3307)		Upload Photo
MacNaught House	75 Spring Street; Summerside PE	46°23′39″N 63°47′21″W	Summerside municipality (2611)		Upload Photo
Neil MacQuarrie House	61 Granville Street; Summerside PE	46°23′36″N 63°47′16″W	Summerside municipality (2732)		Upload Photo
Memorial Square	Spring and Summer Streets; Summerside PE	46°23′37″N 63°47′24″W	Summerside municipality (16330)		Upload Photo
Colin Milligan House	221 Notre Dame Street; Summerside PE	46°23′44″N 63°47′18″W	Summerside municipality (16294)		Upload Photo
Robert Morrison House	56 Spring Street; Summerside PE	46°23′36″N 63°47′23″W	Summerside municipality (15582)		Upload Photo
203 Notre Dame Street	203 Notre Dame Street; Summerside PE	46°23′43″N 63°47′15″W	Summerside municipality (10069)		Upload Photo
Parish School	153 Spring Street; Summerside PE	46°23′48″N 63°47′18″W	Summerside municipality (2730)		Upload Photo
Parkside Elementary School	195 Summer Street; Summerside PE	46°23′54″N 63°47′21″W	Prince Edward Island (1235)		Upload Photo
PEIR Armoury	33 Summer Street; Summerside PE	46°23′32″N 63°47′32″W	Federal (11247)		Upload Photo
353 Poplar Avenue / MacDowell House	353 Poplar Avenue; Summerside PE	46°24′05″N 63°47′31″W	Summerside municipality (10970)		Upload Photo
Post Office	57 Central Street; Summerside PE	46°23′37″N 63°47′32″W	Federal (10438)		Upload Photo
4 Queen Street	4 Queen Street; Summerside PE	46°23′30″N 63°47′35″W	Summerside municipality (10109)		Upload Photo
William Reid House	217 Notre Dame Street; Summerside PE	46°23′43″N 63°47′17″W	Summerside municipality (15606)		Upload Photo
St. John's Anglican Church	62 South Drive; Summerside PE	46°25′11″N 63°48′39″W	Summerside municipality (16353)		Upload Photo
St. Mary's Anglican Church	66 Summer Street; Summerside PE	46°23′38″N 63°47′28″W	Summerside municipality (11073)		Upload Photo
St. Mary's Anglican Church Hall	74 Summer Street; Summerside PE	46°23′39″N 63°47′27″W	Summerside municipality (11080)		Upload Photo
St. Mary's Anglican Rectory	177 Summer Street; Summerside PE	46°23′52″N 63°47′21″W	Summerside municipality (16325)		Upload Photo
Harold Schurman House	161 Fitzroy Street; Summerside PE	46°23′33″N 63°47′11″W	Summerside municipality (2723)		Upload Photo
341 Second Street / Todd House	341 Second Street; Summerside PE	46°23′37″N 63°47′38″W	Summerside municipality (12426)		Upload Photo
Site of former Summerside Drill Shed	Spring Street; Summerside PE	46°23′39″N 63°47′24″W	Summerside municipality (10065)		Upload Photo
44 Spring Street	44 Spring Street; Summerside PE	46°23′35″N 63°47′23″W	Summerside municipality (10062)		Upload Photo
66 Spring Street	66 Spring Street; Summerside PE	46°23′38″N 63°47′22″W	Summerside municipality (10061)		Upload Photo
90 Spring Street	90 Spring Street; Summerside PE	46°23′42″N 63°47′23″W	Summerside municipality (11265)		Upload Photo
112 Spring Street	112 Spring Street; Summerside PE	46°23′43″N 63°47′20″W	Summerside municipality (11048)		Upload Photo
154 Spring Street	154 Spring Street; Summerside PE	46°23′48″N 63°47′19″W	Summerside municipality (10064)		Upload Photo
181 Spring Street	181 Spring Street; Summerside PE	46°23′52″N 63°47′17″W	Summerside municipality (10107)		Upload Photo
33 Summer Street	33 Summer Street; Summerside PE	46°23′34″N 63°47′27″W	Summerside municipality (10105)		Upload Photo
57 Summer Street	57 Summer Street; Summerside PE	46°23′37″N 63°47′26″W	Summerside municipality (11062)		Upload Photo
58 Summer Street	58 Summer Street; Summerside PE	46°23′37″N 63°47′27″W	Summerside municipality (10060)		Upload Photo
82 Summer Street	82 Summer Street; Summerside PE	46°23′40″N 63°47′26″W	Summerside municipality (11089)		Upload Photo
89 Summer Street	89 Summer Street; Summerside PE	46°23′41″N 63°47′24″W	Summerside municipality (10104)		Upload Photo
92 Summer Street	92 Summer Street; Summerside PE	46°23′41″N 63°47′26″W	Summerside municipality (11124)		Upload Photo
103 Summer Street	103 Summer Street; Summerside PE	46°23′43″N 63°47′24″W	Summerside municipality (11127)		Upload Photo
112 Summer Street / B.W. Tanton House	112 Summer Street; Summerside PE	46°23′44″N 63°47′25″W	Summerside municipality (12421)		Upload Photo
122 Spring Street	122 Spring Street; Summerside PE	46°23′45″N 63°47′20″W	Summerside municipality (11038)		Upload Photo
156 Summer Street	156 Summer Street; Summerside PE	46°23′49″N 63°47′23″W	Summerside municipality (10106)		Upload Photo
Summerside Back Range Light	14 Glover's Shore Road; Summerside PE	46°23′29″N 63°46′17″W	Summerside municipality (10116)		
Summerside City Hall	45 Summer Street; Summerside PE	46°23′35″N 63°47′26″W	Summerside municipality (2753)		
Summerside Law Courts	108 Central Street; Summerside PE	46°23′44″N 63°47′30″W	Prince Edward Island (1629), Summerside municipality (2610)		
Summerside United Baptist Church	219 Church Street; Summerside PE	46°23′37″N 63°47′21″W	Summerside municipality (15107)		Upload Photo
Tower	Summerside PE	46°23′20″N 63°47′17″W	Federal (11050)		
Trinity United Church	90 Spring Street; Summerside PE	46°23′41″N 63°47′21″W	Summerside municipality (16183)		Upload Photo
George P. Walker House	227 Notre Dame Street; Summerside PE	46°23′44″N 63°47′19″W	Summerside municipality (15584)		Upload Photo
2 Water Street	2 Water Street; Summerside PE	46°23′34″N 63°46′20″W	Summerside municipality (10101)		Upload Photo
21 Water Street	21 Water Street; Summerside PE	46°23′32″N 63°46′28″W	Summerside municipality (11133)		Upload Photo
101 Water Street	101 Water Street; Summerside PE	46°23′25″N 63°47′00″W	Summerside municipality (10103)		Upload Photo
192 Water Street	192 Water Street; Summerside PE	46°23′28″N 63°47′18″W	Summerside municipality (10102)		
250 Water Street	250 Water Street; Summerside PE	46°23′29″N 63°47′25″W	Summerside municipality (10088)		Upload Photo
268 Water Street	268 Water Street; Summerside PE	46°23′29″N 63°47′28″W	Summerside municipality (10059)		Upload Photo
292 Water Street	292 Water Street; Summerside PE	46°23′30″N 63°47′30″W	Summerside municipality (10087)		Upload Photo
310 Water Street	310 Water Street; Summerside PE	46°23′30″N 63°47′34″W	Summerside municipality (11162)		Upload Photo
340 Water Street	340 Water Street; Summerside PE	46°23′32″N 63°47′39″W	Summerside municipality (10094)		Upload Photo
359 Water Street	359 Water Street; Summerside PE	46°23′33″N 63°47′40″W	Summerside municipality (12583)		Upload Photo
Norman Wright House	160 Spring Street; Summerside PE	46°23′50″N 63°47′18″W	Summerside municipality (15465)		Upload Photo
Wyatt Historic House	85 Spring Street; Summerside PE	46°23′40″N 63°47′20″W	Summerside municipality (2612)		Upload Photo

== See also ==
- List of historic places in Prince County, Prince Edward Island
- List of historic places in Prince Edward Island
- List of National Historic Sites of Canada in Prince Edward Island
- Heritage Places Protection Act
