= Lot 7, Prince Edward Island =

Lot 7
- Township
- Nickname: Burton West
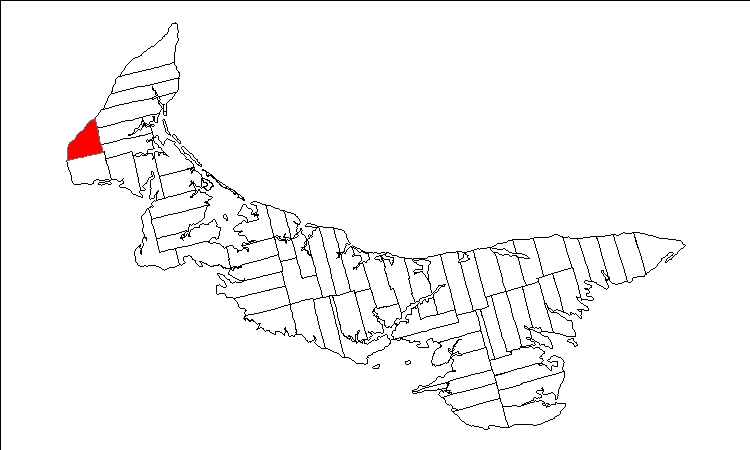
- Map of Prince Edward Island highlighting Lot 7
- Coordinates: 46°44′N 64°21′W
- Country: Canada
- Province: Prince Edward Island
- County: Prince County
- Parish: Egmont Parish

Area
  - Total: 77.09 km^{2} (29.76 sq mi)

Population (2016)
  - Total: 459
  - Density: 7.3/km^{2} (19/sq mi)
- Time zone: UTC-4 (AST)
  - Summer (DST): UTC-3 (ADT)
- Canadian Postal code: C0B
- Area code: 902
- NTS Map: 021I09
- GNBC Code: BAEQT

Lot 7 is a township in Prince County, Prince Edward Island, Canada. Lot 7 was awarded to Sir James Montgomery, 1st Baronet in the 1767 land lottery. It is part of Egmont Parish. Its shores bring in lobster and sea glass. A primarily Irish community.

== Communities ==
Incorporated municipalities:

- none

Civic address communities:

- Burton
- Campbellton
- Cape Wolfe
- Forestview
- Glengarry
- Haliburton
- Knutsford
- Springfield West
- West Cape

== Demographics ==
Historical population
Year	Pop.	±%
1871	867	—
1881	1,073	+23.8%
1891	1,038	−3.3%
1901	960	−7.5%
1911	864	−10.0%
1921	769	−11.0%
1931	692	−10.0%
1941	739	+6.8%
2016	459	−37.9%
