= Apothecaries Hall =

Apothecaries Hall may mean:

- Apothecaries' Hall, London, home of the Worshipful Society of Apothecaries, in Blackfriars, London, England
- Apothecaries' Hall of Ireland, an association of medical practitioners
- Apothecaries Hall (Prince Edward Island), on the list of National Historic Sites of Canada in Prince Edward Island
