= Duvar =

Duvar may refer to:

- Turkish for wall
- Duvar (film)
- Duvar, Prince Edward Island
- Gazete Duvar
