= North Cape Light =

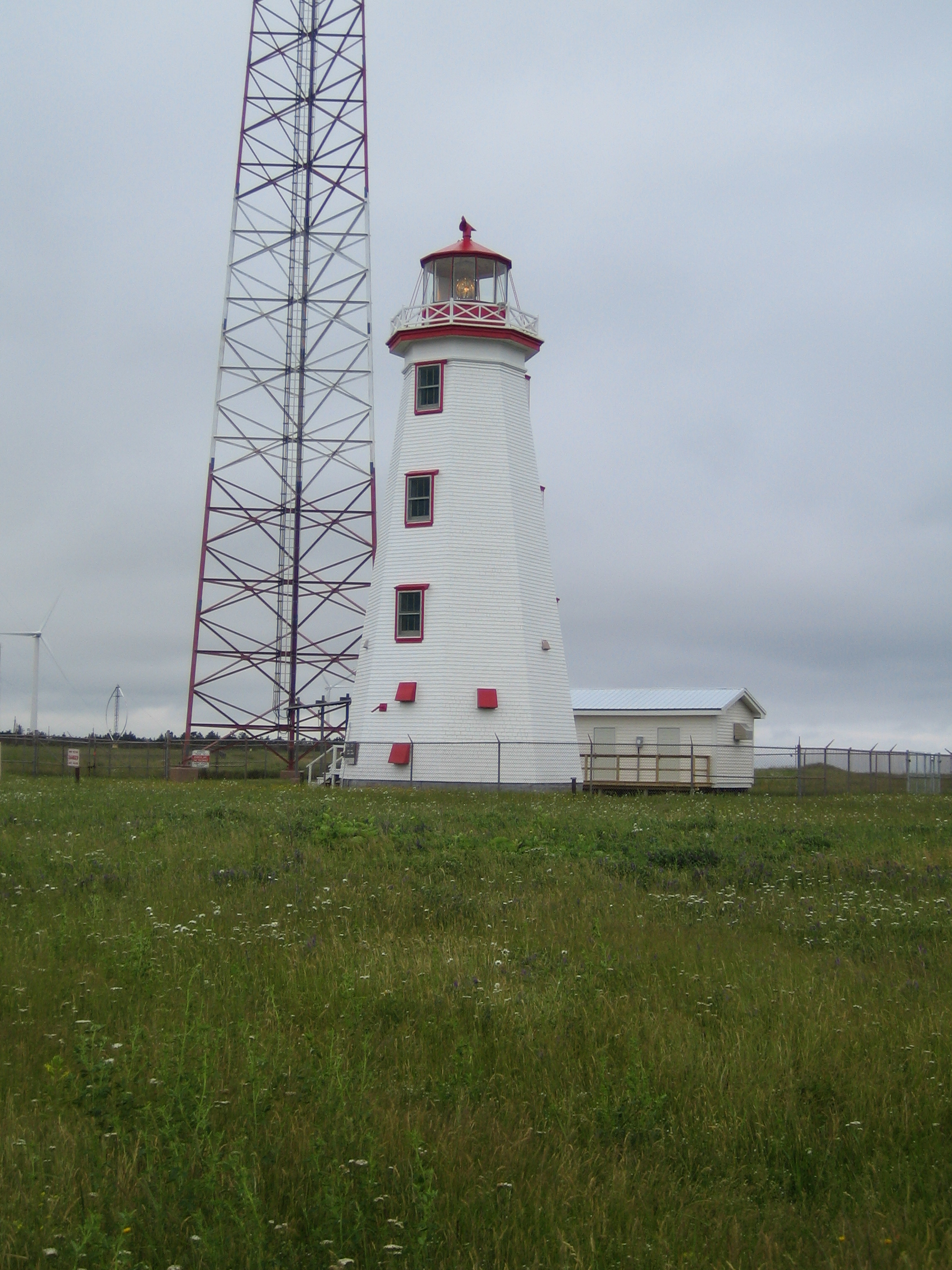
- Location: Prince Edward Island; Canada
- Coordinates: 47°03′27.8″N 63°59′48.9″W

Tower
- Constructed: 1861 (first)
- Automated: 1967
- Height: 19.5 metres (64 ft)
- Shape: octagonal tower with lantern and gallery
- Markings: white tower, red lantern and trim
- Heritage: recognized federal heritage building of Canada, designated heritage place

Light
- First lit: 1867 (current)
- Focal height: 23.7 metres (78 ft)
- Range: 18 nautical miles (33 km; 21 mi)
- Characteristic: Fl Y 5s.
- Canada no.: 1036

Prince Edward Island Heritage Place
- Type: Designated Heritage Place
- Designated: 2012-10-03
- Reference no.: 7782

The North Cape Light is an active lighthouse on Prince Edward Island, Canada. It was built in 1867, and is still active.

== See also ==
- List of lighthouses in Prince Edward Island
- List of lighthouses in Canada
