= List of historic places in Prince Edward Island =

The list of historic places in the province of Prince Edward Island contains heritage sites listed on the Canadian Register of Historic Places (CRHP), all of which are designated as historic places either locally, provincially, federally or by more than one level of government.

The list has been divided by county and city boundaries for reasons of length. See separate lists for the following geographic divisions:

- Charlottetown
- Summerside
- Kings County
- Queens County outside Charlottetown
- Prince County outside Summerside

== See also ==
- List of National Historic Sites of Canada in Prince Edward Island
- Heritage Places Protection Act
- List of museums in Prince Edward Island
