= Egmont Parish, Prince Edward Island =

Civil parish

Coordinates: 46°45′37.3″N 64°18′26.9″W

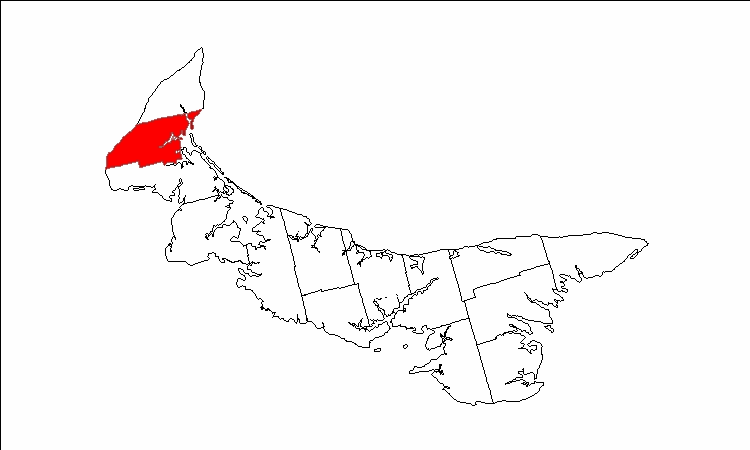

Egmont Parish was created as a civil parish in Prince County, Prince Edward Island, Canada, during the 1764–1766 survey of Samuel Holland.

It contains the following townships:

- Lot 4
- Lot 5
- Lot 6
- Lot 7
