= O'Brien Road, Prince Edward Island =

Coordinates: 46.809°N 64.203°W

Location of O'Brien Road in Prince Edward Island

O'Brien Road is a settlement in Prince Edward Island.
