= Bloomfield Corner, Prince Edward Island =

Locality in Prince Edward Island, Canada

Coordinates: 46.761°N 64.180°W

Location of Bloomfield Corner in Prince Edward Island

Bloomfield Corner is a locality in the Canadian province of Prince Edward Island.
