= Union, Prince Edward Island =

Human settlement in Prince County. Prince Edward Island, Canada

Coordinates: 46.797°N 64.093°W

Location of Union in Prince Edward Island

Union is a settlement in Lot 4 and Lot 5, Prince Edward Island.
