= St. Anthony, Prince Edward Island =

Locality in Prince Edward Island, Canada

Coordinates: 46.738°N 64.174°W

Location of St. Anthony in Prince Edward Island

St. Anthony is a locality in the Canadian province of Prince Edward Island.
