= Brockton, Prince Edward Island =

Locality in Prince Edward Island, Canada

Coordinates: 46.801°N 64.249°W

Location of Brockton in Prince Edward Island

Brockton is a locality in the Canadian province of Prince Edward Island.
