= Shaw's Hotel =

Historic inn in Prince Edward Island, Canada

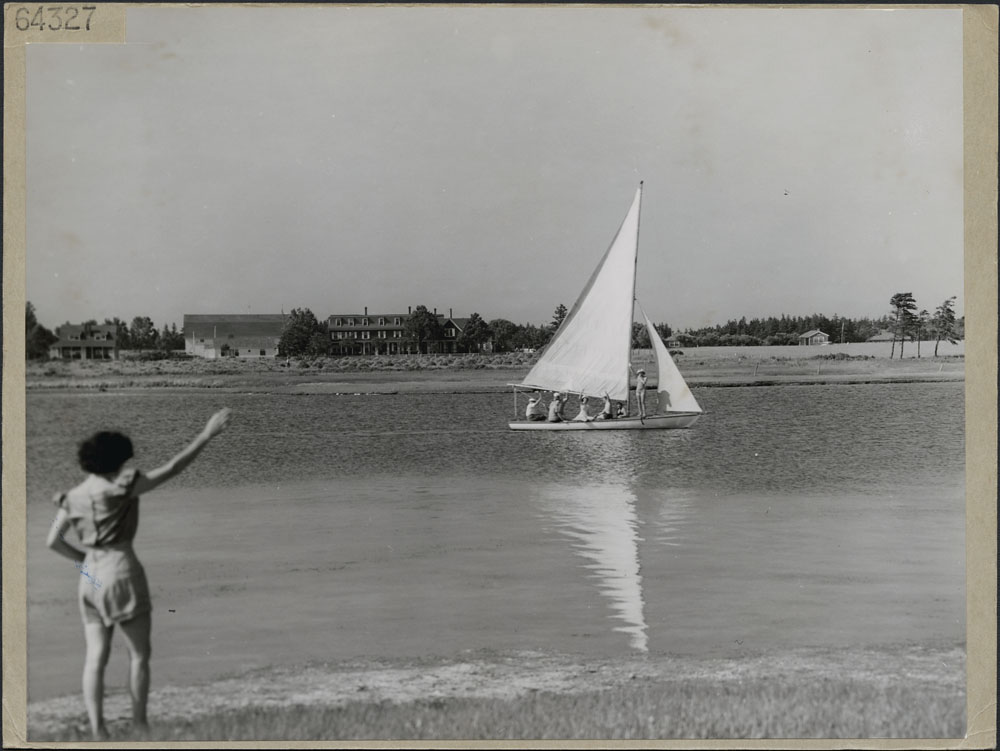
- Shaw's Hotel in Brackley Beach, Prince Edward Island.
- Interactive map of the Shaw's Hotel area

General information
- Location: 99 Apple Tree Rd, Brackley Beach PE
- Coordinates: 46°25′27″N 63°11′30″W

Website
- https://shawshotel.ca/

Shaw's Hotel is a family-operated inn located at Brackley Beach on the north shore of Prince Edward Island, Canada. It is one of the oldest continuously operated inns in Canada.

== History ==
The original Shaw farmhouse, constructed by Neil Shaw, was destroyed by fire in an accident. A second farmhouse erected subsequently was also lost to fire. The present two and a half storey farmhouse, built in the 1850s, served as a replacement for these earlier buildings.

Shaw's Hotel was established in 1860 when the Shaw family was contacted by the colleague of a family friend who was looking for a seaside place for his daughter with a respiratory illness to stay. The Shaw family initially allowed paying guests to stay at the 5 vacant rooms within their farmhouse, but the 20-acre farmhouse property has since been expanded significantly to include a dining room extension to the main farmhouse in 1960, two barns in 1943 and 1944 and twenty-five cottages from 1896 to 2000.

Shaw farms ceased operation in the 1970s, with the barns now being used as storage. The fields are still rented out to farmers. The hotel was designated a National Historic Site of Canada on March 5th, 2004.

The author Pierre Berton wrote part of The National Dream while staying at the hotel.

In 2022, Hurricane Fiona impacted the Shaw’s Farms property, resulting in the destruction of a barn and a boathouse, and causing significant damage to the main farmhouse, including the loss of its roof. Repairs to the property were finished in the spring of 2023.
