= Alma, Prince Edward Island =

Locality in Prince Edward Island, Canada

Coordinates: 46.861°N 64.109°W

Location of Alma in Prince Edward Island

Alma is a locality in the Canadian province of Prince Edward Island.

It is an unincorporated area located in Prince County in the western portion of Prince Edward Island, northwest of Alberton. Its precise location is N 46°52', W 64°07'.
