= Cascumpec, Prince Edward Island =

Settlement in Prince Edward Island, Canada

Coordinates: 46.753°N 64.088°W

Location of Cascumpec in Prince Edward Island

Cascumpec (Mi'kmaq: Qasqamgeg), also spelled Cascumpeg, is an unincorporated settlement in Prince Edward Island.
