= Duvar, Prince Edward Island =

Duvar
- Settlement
- Location of Duvar in Prince Edward Island
- Coordinates: 46.743°N 64.241°W
- Country: Canada
- Province: Prince Edward Island
- County: Prince County
- Named for: John Hunter-Duvar
- Elevation: 34 m (112 ft)
- Time zone: UTC-04:00 (AST)
- Postal code: C0B 1E0
- Area codes: 902, 782

Duvar is a small rural settlement located in Prince County, on the western side of Prince Edward Island, Canada. It lies to the north of O'Leary and is situated within the Prince County census division.

== Name ==
The community of Duvar was named after John Hunter-Duvar, a fisheries inspector and poet. In 1861, to distinguish himself from others with the common name John Hunter, he adopted the name "Duvar." The name "Duvar Road" was in use by 1872, and a post office named Duvar Road operated from 1896 to 1914.
