= Piusville, Prince Edward Island =

Coordinates: 46.788°N 64.197°W

Location of Piusville in Prince Edward Island

Piusville is a settlement in Prince Edward Island.
