= Fortune Cove, Prince Edward Island =

Locality in Prince Edward Island, Canada

Coordinates: 46.717°N 64.165°W

Location of Fortune Cove in Prince Edward Island

Fortune Cove is a locality in the Canadian province of Prince Edward Island.
