= Heritage Places Protection Act =

Act about the protection of cultural heritage of the Prince Edward Island

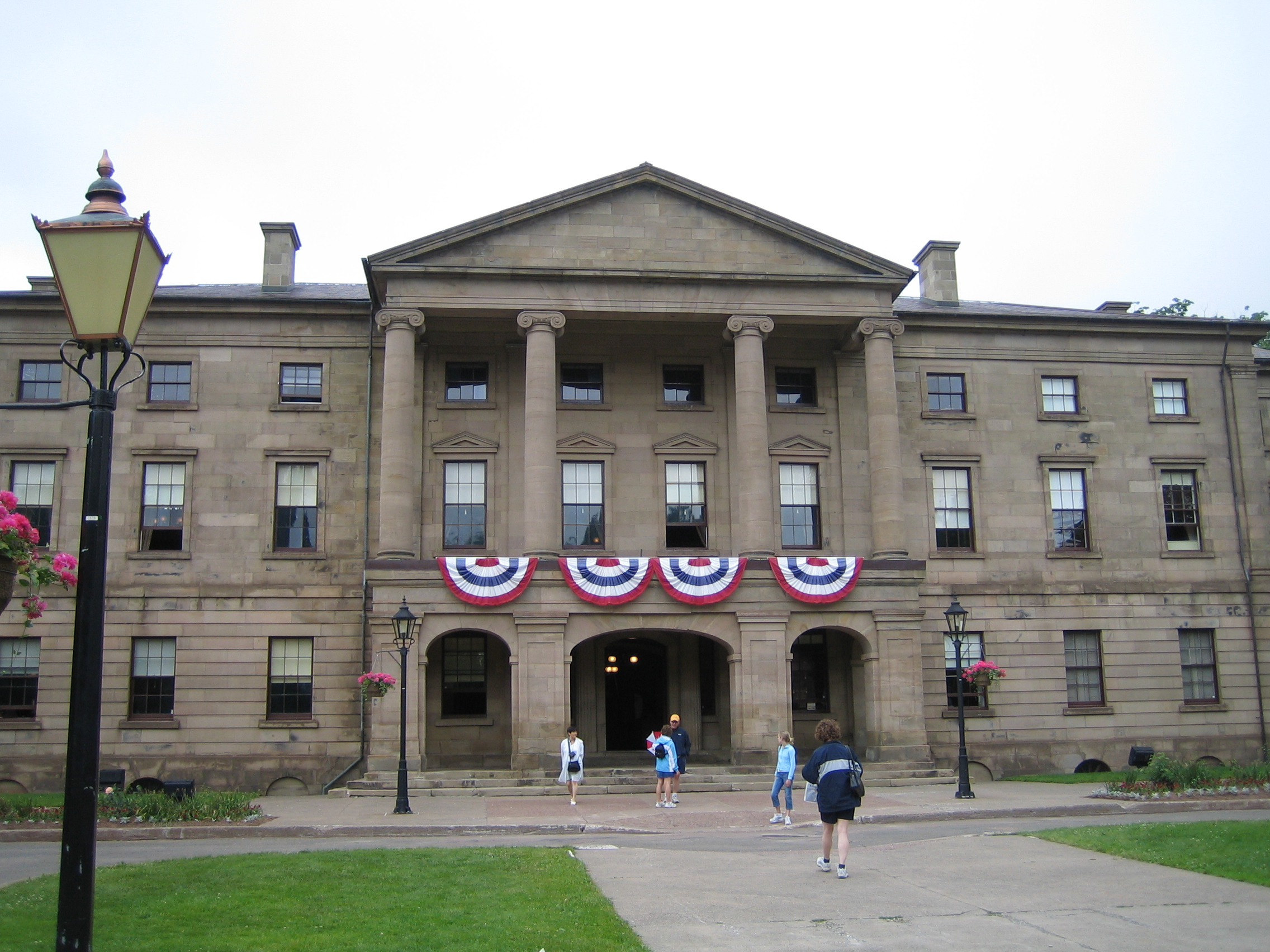
- Province House, where Prince Edward Island's legislature meets, became a Designated Heritage Place under the Heritage Places Protection Act in 2004

Legislative Assembly of Prince Edward Island
- Citation: R.S.P.E.I. 1988, c. H-3.1
- Territorial extent: Prince Edward Island
- Enacted by: Legislative Assembly of Prince Edward Island
- Enacted: 1988

The Heritage Places Protection Act is a provincial statute which allows for the recognition and protection of cultural heritage and natural heritage properties in the province of Prince Edward Island, Canada.

The Act requires the province's Minister of Tourism and Culture to establish a register of "heritage places", sites containing or comprising immovable "historic resources" (defined as any work of nature or of man that is primarily of value for its palaeontological, archaeological, prehistoric, historic, cultural, natural, scientific or aesthetic interest). A place may consist of a single property and/or building, a heritage trail or corridor, or a heritage district comprising more than one heritage place. There are two levels of historic recognition for heritage places included on the register:

1. Registered Heritage Place: Any site or structure that has been researched and has been deemed to be a provincial heritage resource. This level of recognition identifies the place as being of historic value, yet does not place any restrictions on the property owner.
2. Designated Heritage Place: Any site or structure designated by the Minister. Designation is the highest level of recognition under the Act. No owner can demolish or alter a building or structure within a Designated Heritage Place, nor can they build or undertake works that may adversely affect any designated land, without a permit from the Minister.

Prince Edward Island has a heritage plaque program to provide public recognition for Designated Heritage Places which are designated under the terms of the Act. The navy blue and gold enamel plaques are provided at no cost to the owners of designated buildings.

The Minister may delegate any of his or her powers under the Act to a municipality, with the consent of the municipal council in question, as long as the municipality has a heritage plan in place setting out its objectives, policies and programs for the conservation of its heritage. The Province's two most populous municipalities, Charlottetown and Summerside, accordingly have civic recognition programs for historic sites within their respective jurisdictions.

== See also ==
- Heritage conservation in Canada
- List of historic places in Prince Edward Island
- List of National Historic Sites of Canada in Prince Edward Island
