= Huntley, Prince Edward Island =

Locality in Prince Edward Island, Canada

Coordinates: 46.849°N 64.0851°W

Location of Huntley in Prince Edward Island

Huntley is a locality in the Canadian province of Prince Edward Island, located in Prince County.
