= Glengarry, Prince Edward Island =

Glengarry
- Settlement
- Location of Glengarry in Prince Edward Island
- Coordinates: 46.7638°N 64.3106°W
- Country: Canada
- Province: Prince Edward Island
- County: Prince County
- Township: Lot 11
- Time zone: UTC-04:00 (AST)
- Postal code span: V0B
- Area codes: 902, 782

Glengarry is a settlement in western Prince Edward Island.
