= List of National Historic Sites of Canada in Prince Edward Island =

This is a list of National Historic Sites (French: Lieux historiques nationaux) in the province of Prince Edward Island. There are 22 National Historic Sites designated in Prince Edward Island, five of which are administered by Parks Canada (identified below by the beaver icon). The first National Historic Site to be designated in Prince Edward Island was Jean-Pierre Roma at Three Rivers in 1933.

Numerous National Historic Events also occurred in P.E.I., and are identified at places associated with them, using the same style of federal plaque which marks National Historic Sites. Several National Historic Persons are commemorated throughout the province in the same way. The markers do not indicate which designation—a Site, Event, or Person—a subject has been given.

This list uses names designated by the national Historic Sites and Monuments Board, which may differ from other names for these sites.

== National Historic Sites ==
Site	Date(s)	Designated	Location	Description	Image
Alberton Court House	1878 (completed)	1981	Alberton; 46°48′45.1″N 64°4′6.6″W	A simple wooden hall evocative of a pioneer church, now used as the local museum; representative of the six circuit courthouses, all built according to a standard plan after the passage of Prince Edward Island's County Courts Act in 1873	
All Souls' Chapel	1888 (completed)	1990	Charlottetown; 46°14′2.43″N 63°7′57.56″W	A small chapel built of rust-red, Prince Edward Island sandstone, attached to St. Peter's Anglican Cathedral; known as an exceptional example of the High Victorian Gothic Revival style in Canada, and for its 18 interior mural paintings by Robert Harris	View of the altar in All Souls' Chapel
Apothecaries Hall	1900 (completed)	1969	Charlottetown; 46°14′5″N 63°7′41.16″W	A three-storey brick building in which an apothecary shop operated from 1810 to 1986, making it one of the oldest continually operated pharmacies in Canada	Red and buff brick three-storey building with decorative brickwork
Ardgowan	1850 (completed)	1966	Charlottetown; 46°15′7.29″N 63°7′34.64″W	The residence of William Henry Pope, a Father of Confederation; the Popes billetted George Brown and hosted a luncheon for delegates here during the Charlottetown Conference	Portrait of William Henry Pope
Charlottetown City Hall	1888 (completed)	1984	Charlottetown; 46°14′6.97″N 63°7′46.59″W	A Romanesque Revival style town hall, the design of which symbolizes the growth and prosperity of Prince Edward Island and its capital in the late 19th century	Exterior view of Charlottetown City Hall
Confederation Centre of the Arts	1964 (completed)	2003	Charlottetown; 46°14′4.29″N 63°7′36.32″W	A Brutalist style multi-purpose cultural centre containing a theatre, art gallery and public library; built as a memorial to the Fathers of Confederation who met at the Charlottetown Conference, the facility is representative of the wave of cultural complexes built in the 1960s and 1970s in Canada	Exterior view of the Confederation Centre of the Arts
Dalvay-by-the-Sea	1899 (completed)	1990	Prince Edward Island National Park; 46°24′53.48″N 63°4′24.01″W	A summer residence built for Alexander McDonald, president of Standard Oil of Kentucky; now a hotel, it is a noted example of the Queen Anne Revival style in Canadian domestic architecture	Exterior view of Dalvay-by-the-Sea across the water
Dundas Terrace	1889 (completed)	1990	Charlottetown; 46°13′48.65″N 63°7′39.1″W	A wooden three-and-a-half-storey apartment building; a noted example of the Queen Anne Revival style in Canadian apartment building architecture	Sepia-toned 1890s photo of dirt road with Queen Anne-style apartment at the end, with water in the distance
Fairholm	1839 (completed)	1992	Charlottetown; 46°14′18.36″N 63°7′37.98″W	A brick villa a carriage house built for Thomas Heath Haviland, Sr.; an excellent and rare surviving example of a Picturesque villa in Atlantic Canada	Sepia-toned 1890s photograph showing two men in late 19th-century clothing standing on the street corner in front of a brick house
Farmers' Bank of Rustico	1863 (completed)	1959	North Rustico; 46°25′23.9″N 63°17′0.07″W	A stone building that housed one of the first people's banks in the country, offering loans to residents in the predominantly Acadian farming community; its establishment heralded the development of the credit union movement in Canada	Exterior view of the Farmers' Bank of Rustico
Former Summerside Post Office	1887 (completed)	1983	Summerside; 46°23′36.04″N 63°47′26.32″W	A stone post office with Gothic and Romanesque elements; representative of the small urban post offices erected by the Department of Public Works in smaller urban centres during Thomas Fuller's term as Chief Architect; current town hall	
Government House	1834 (completed)	1971	Charlottetown; 46°13′52.42″N 63°8′10.15″W	The official residence of the Lieutenant Governor of Prince Edward Island, it sits on a more extensive property called Fanningbank. It is a finely-proportioned frame structure of Canada in the neoclassical style	Exterior view of Government House and its grounds
Great George Street Historic District		1990	Charlottetown; 46°14′1.74″N 63°7′28.21″W	A wide six-block street that begins at the waterfront and ends at Province House; the view up Great George Street from Peake's Quay contains many elements that the Fathers of Confederation would have experienced on their way to the Charlottetown Conference in 1864	Looking from Province House down Great Gorge Street
Jean-Pierre Roma at Three Rivers	1732 (establishment)	1933	Brudenell; 46°10′54.88″N 62°33′37.13″W	Jean Pierre Roma established a fishing and trading post on this site in 1732, which was destroyed by New Englanders in 1745 after the Siege of Louisbourg; symbolic of the French presence on Île Saint-Jean (later named Prince Edward Island)	
Kensington Railway Station	1904 (completed)	1976	Kensington; 46°26′16.15″N 63°38′20.15″W	A fieldstone station with a high gable roof and sheltered platforms, originally built for the Prince Edward Island Railway; commemorates development of the railways in the Maritimes and a rare surviving example of a railway station in Prince Edward Island	
L.M. Montgomery's Cavendish		2004	Cavendish; 46°29′15.68″N 63°22′54.64″W	A cultural landscape near Cavendish that author Lucy Maud Montgomery made famous in her Anne of Green Gables books	Exterior view of the Green Gables farmhouse
Province House	1847 (completed)	1966	Charlottetown; 46°14′5.74″N 63°7′33.9″W	A neoclassical legislative building that served as the site of the Charlottetown Conference of 1864, the first meeting that led to Canadian Confederation	Exterior view of the front facade of Province House
Shaw's Hotel	1860 (lodge completed)	2003	Brackley Beach; 46°25′26.13″N 63°11′29.84″W	A two-and-a-half-storey main lodge, with two large barns and twenty-five cottages sitting on a 8-hectare (20-acre) site; operating as a tourist resort for more than 150 years, the site is evocative of the early years of tourism in Canada	
Skmaqn—Port-la-Joye—Fort Amherst	1720 (established)	1958	Rocky Point; 46.197222°N 63.136944°W	A hilly landscape on the west side of the channel entrance to Charlottetown harbour, with remnants of an 18th-century fort built by the French and later occupied by the British; the site was the seat of government and port of entry for settlers to Île Saint-Jean/Prince Edward Island	Exterior view of the Port-la-Joye—Fort Amherst landscape
St. Dunstan's Roman Catholic Basilica	1907 (completed)	1990	Charlottetown; 46°14′0.96″N 63°7′31.44″W	St. Dunstan's is the centre of the Roman Catholic Church in Prince Edward Island and the mother church of the diocese; it was elevated to the status of Basilica in 1929; a noted example of the High Victorian Gothic Revival style in Canada	Exterior view of front facade of St. Dunstan's Basilica
Strathgartney Homestead	1861 (completed)	1996	Bonshaw; 46°12′3.33″N 63°21′17.07″W	A 13-hectare (32-acre) remnant of the 200-hectare (490-acre) estate of Robert Bruce Stewart, a nineteenth-century landowner; illustrative of the land tenure system that dominated Prince Edward Island until the passage of the Land Purchase Act of 1875	
Tryon United Church	1881 (completed)	1990	Tryon; 46°14′28.64″N 63°30′7.3″W	A wooden church designed for a Methodist congregation by William Critchlow Harris; now a United Church, it is an exceptional example of the Gothic Revival style in Canadian architecture.	

== See also ==
- History of Prince Edward Island
- List of historic places in Prince Edward Island
