= Brooklyn (disambiguation) =

Brooklyn is a borough of New York City.

Brooklyn may also refer to:

== Places ==
=== Australia ===
- Brooklyn, Victoria, a suburb of Melbourne
- Brooklyn, New South Wales, a fishing town on the edge of Sydney
- Brooklyn, Tasmania, a suburb of Burnie
- Brooklyn Park, South Australia, a suburb of Adelaide
- Brooklyn Sanctuary, a nature reserve in Queensland

=== Canada ===
- Brooklyn, Newfoundland and Labrador, a settlement
- Brooklyn, Yarmouth County, Nova Scotia, a small village
- Brooklyn, Queens County, Nova Scotia, a village near Liverpool
- Brooklyn, Hants County, Nova Scotia, a rural community
- Brooklyn, Prince Edward Island, either of two settlements

=== Netherlands ===
- Breukelen, a town northwest of Utrecht

=== New Zealand ===
- Brooklyn, Wellington, a suburb
  - Brooklyn (New Zealand electorate), a parliamentary constituency
- Brooklyn, Tasman District, a settlement and rural valley

=== South Africa ===
- Brooklyn, Pretoria, a suburb
- Brooklyn, Cape Town, a suburb

=== United States ===
- Brooklyn, California, former city annexed to Oakland
- Brooklyn, California, former name of Red Dog, California
- Brooklyn, Connecticut, a town
  - Brooklyn (CDP), Connecticut, its central village
  - Brooklyn Green Historic District, at the center of the village
- Brooklyn (Waterbury), Connecticut
- Brooklyn (Jacksonville), Florida
- Brooklyn, Illinois
- Brooklyn, Indiana
- Brooklyn, Iowa
- Brooklyn, Kentucky, now part of Dayton, Kentucky
- Brooklyn, Baltimore, Maryland
- Brooklyn Park, Maryland, in Anne Arundel County but adjacent to Brooklyn, Baltimore
- Brooklyn, Michigan
- Brooklyn, Minnesota, a former township in Saint Louis County, now part of Hibbing, Minnesota
- Brooklyn Center, Minnesota, a city formerly part of Brooklyn Township in Hennepin County
- Brooklyn Park, Minnesota, a city formerly part of Brooklyn Township in Hennepin County
- Brooklyn, Missouri
- Brooklyn, East Otto, New York, a hamlet in Cattaraugus County
- Brooklyn, Franklin, Delaware County, New York, a former hamlet
- Brooklyn, a neighborhood in Charlotte, North Carolina
- Brooklyn, part of Glenwood-Brooklyn Historic District in Raleigh, North Carolina
- Brooklyn, Ohio
- Old Brooklyn, Cleveland, Ohio
- Brooklyn, Portland, Oregon
- Brooklyn, Washington
- Brooklyn, West Virginia (disambiguation)
- Brooklyn, Wisconsin (disambiguation)
- Brooklyn Township (disambiguation)

== Arts and entertainment ==
=== Film and television ===
- Brooklyn (film), a 2015 romantic drama based on Colm Tóibín's novel
- Brooklyn Nine-Nine, an American police procedural sitcom (2013-2021)
- Wyatt Cenac: Brooklyn, a standup comedy special
- Brooklyn, a Gargoyles character
- Brooklyn Masefield, a Beyblade character

=== Songs ===
- "Brooklyn", by Gloria Loring under the alias Cody Jameson, 1977
- "Brooklyn", by Jesse Malina from The Fine Art of Self Destruction, 2002
- "Brooklyn", by Maisie Peters from You Signed Up for This, 2021
- "Brooklyn", by Mos Def from Black on Both Sides, 1999
- "Brooklyn", by Woodkid from Iron, 2011
- "Brooklyn", by the Youngblood Brass Band from Center:Level:Roar, 2003
- "Brooklyn (If You See Something, Say Something)", by Taking Back Sunday from Louder Now, 2006
- "Brooklyn (Owes the Charmer Under Me)", by Steely Dan from Can't Buy a Thrill, 1972

=== Other media ===
- Brooklyn (musical), 2004
- Brooklyn (novel), 2009, by Colm Tóibín
  - Brooklyn (film), 2015 film adaptation
- Brooklyn, a 2024 novel by Tracy Brown

== Ships ==
- USS Brooklyn, any of several ships
- SS Brooklyn, a container ship relaunched in 1969, formerly the USS General C. C. Ballou
- Brooklyn (ship), which brought Mormon pioneers to San Francisco in 1846

== Sports ==
=== American football ===
- Brooklyn Dodgers (AAFC), 1946 to 1949
- Brooklyn Dodgers (NFL), 1930 to 1944
- Brooklyn Lions / Horsemen (1926), a National Football League and first American Football League merged franchise
- Brooklyn Tigers, later Rochester Tigers, members of the second American Football League 1936–1937

=== Other sports ===
- Brooklyn (cycling team), an Italian professional cycling team 1970–1977
- Brooklyn Dodgers, Major League Baseball team that became the Los Angeles Dodgers in 1958
- Brooklyn Nets, a professional basketball team in the NBA
- Brooklyn, a term used in bowling

== Other uses ==
- Apache Brooklyn, a distributed computing management framework
- Brooklyn (cocktail)
- Brooklyn (given name)
- Brooklyn Avenue (disambiguation)
- Brooklyn Brewery
- Brooklyn College
- The Brooklyn, Bolton, a listed former public house in Greater Manchester, England
- Brooklyn, a chewing gum manufactured by Perfetti Van Melle

== See also ==
- Brook Lynn, alter ego of singer Mary J. Blige (born 1971)
- Breukelen (disambiguation)
- Brookland (disambiguation)
- Brooklin (disambiguation)
- Brookline (disambiguation)
- Brooklyn Park (disambiguation)
