= Brooklin =

Brooklin may refer to

- Brooklin, Ontario, Canada
- Brooklin, California, United States
- Brooklin, Maine, United States
- Brooklin, West Virginia, United States
- Brooklin (São Paulo Metro), Brazil
- Brooklin Novo, or adjacent Brooklin Velho, neighbourhoods of São Paulo
- Brooklin Models, a line of die-cast toy handmade white metal cars

== See also ==
- Brookline
- Brooklyn, New York
- Brooklyn (disambiguation)
