= Brooklyn, Virginia =

In Virginia, Brooklyn may refer to:

- Brooklyn, Halifax County, Virginia
- Brooklyn, Pulaski County, Virginia

== See also ==
- Brooklyn, West Virginia (disambiguation)
