= Breukelen (disambiguation) =

Breukelen is a town in the Netherlands.

Breukelen may also refer to:

== People ==
- Gijs van Breukelen, Dutch chess composer
- Hans van Breukelen (born 1956), Dutch footballer

== Places ==
- Breukelen-Nijenrode, now part of Breukelen, Netherlands
- Breukelen-Sint Pieters, now part of Breukelen, Netherlands
- Brooklyn, New York, U.S., named for Breukelen, Netherlands

== Other uses ==
- FC Breukelen, Dutch football club

== See also ==
- Brooklyn (disambiguation)
