= USS Brooklyn =

Several ships of the United States Navy have borne the name Brooklyn, after the New York City borough of Brooklyn, with a future submarine of that name announced.

- USS Brooklyn (1858) was a wooden screw sloop commissioned in 1859 and a participant in the American Civil War.
- USS Brooklyn (ACR-3) was a cruiser commissioned in 1896 and a flagship in the Spanish–American War.
- USS Brooklyn (CL-40) was a light cruiser commissioned in 1937 that saw service in World War II and was later transferred to Chile.
- USS Brooklyn (SSN-816) is a planned attack submarine, announced in 2025.

== See also ==
- Brooklyn (disambiguation) § Ships
