= Brookland =

Brookland may refer to:

== England ==
- Brookland, Kent, England

== United States ==
(by state)

- Brookland, Arkansas
- Brookland (Washington, D.C.), a neighborhood of Washington, D.C.
- Brooklyn, New York, sometimes known as "Brookland" before the current spelling was settled upon
- Brookland (Flat Rock, North Carolina), listed on the NRHP
- Brookland (Grassy Creek, North Carolina), listed on the NRHP
- West Columbia, South Carolina, formerly called "Brookland"
  - New Brookland Historic District, West Columbia, SC, listed on the NRHP
- Brookland Park Historic District, Richmond, VA, listed on the NRHP
