= Brooklyn, West Virginia =

Brooklyn, West Virginia may refer to:

- Brooklyn, Fayette County, West Virginia, an unincorporated community
- Brooklyn, Wetzel County, West Virginia, an unincorporated community

== See also ==
- Brooklin, West Virginia
