= Voyage of the Brooklyn Saints =

1846 Mormon pioneer expedition to Alta California

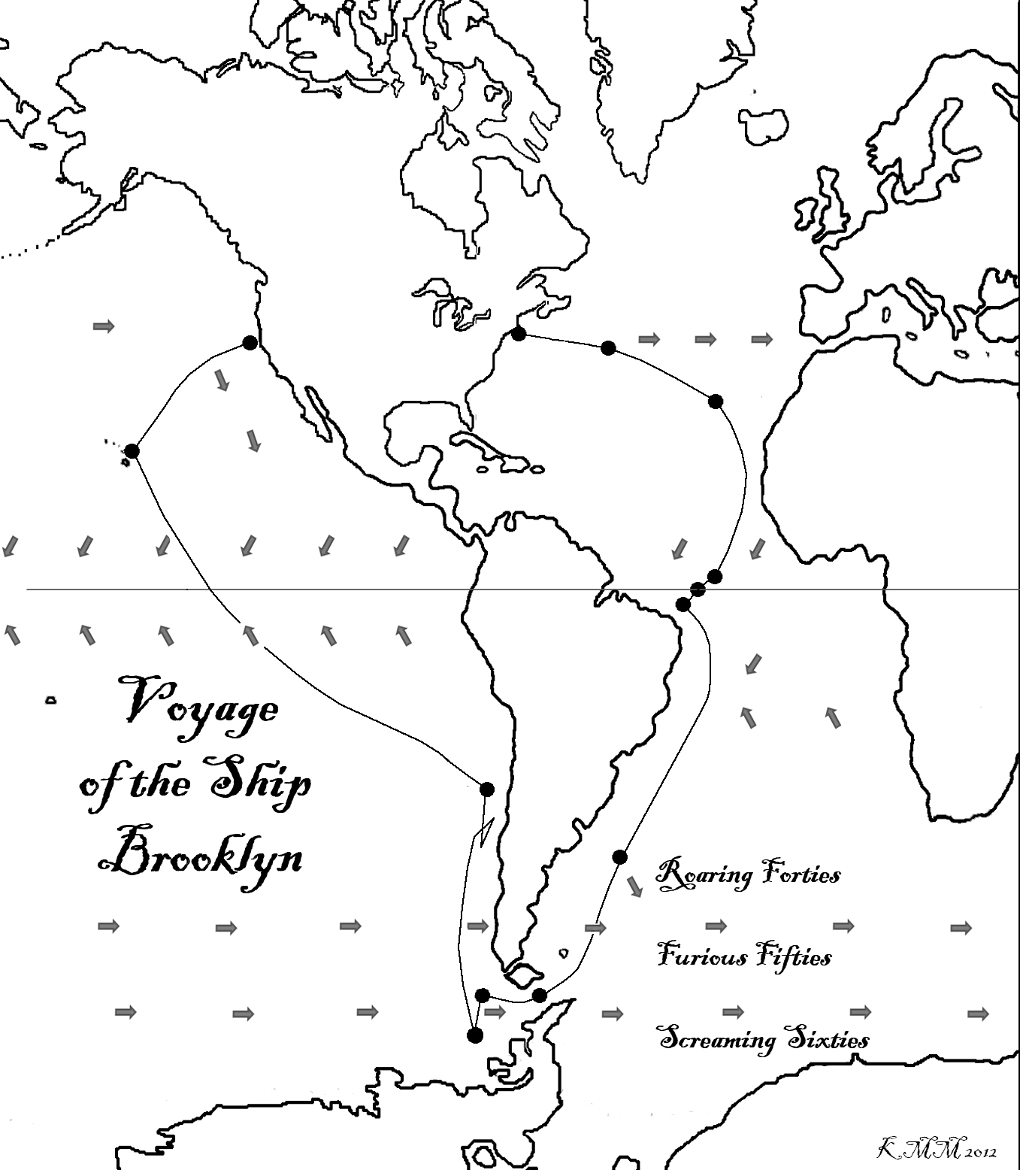
Route of the ship Brooklyn on its historic voyage

On February 4, 1846, a party of Mormon pioneer families (the "Brooklyn Saints") began a voyage aboard the ship Brooklyn from New York City to Alta California, to establish the first Mormon (Note: The term "Mormon" was a contemptuous epithet in common use. Members of the Church of Jesus Christ of Latter-day Saints referred to themselves as "Latter-day Saints" or "Saints".) colony in the West, as part of the plan by the Church of Jesus Christ of Latter-day Saints (LDS Church) to relocate the Mormon populace outside the United States to escape religious persecution. Two hundred thirty eight pioneers, led by Samuel Brannan, were recruited to sail around Cape Horn with heavy equipment for a large colony, plant crops, and build infrastructure to receive a larger migration that was planned to come west by wagon the following year.

Brooklyn took six months to sail 24,000 miles. It arrived at the San Francisco Bay shortly after the Mexican–American War commenced in California, just as US forces were gaining control of the area. Brooklyn's seventy male passengers were immediately pressed into service, delaying the construction of the planned settlement.

Initially, food and shelter was scarce, but soon many acres of land in the San Joaquin Valley were fenced and planted with wheat, and a grain mill was erected. Eight nearby towns were founded, connected by ferries, roads and bridges. The Brooklyn Saints were instrumental in building San Francisco, which, as other American settlers arrived, grew into "the great emporium of the Pacific".

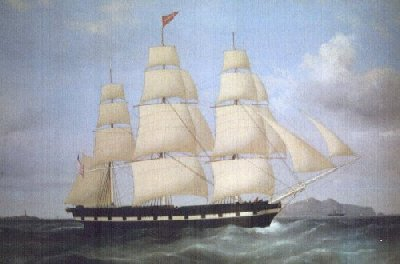
Duncan MacFarlane - The ship Brooklyn off Skerries Rock

In 1847, the Brooklyn colonists learned that instead of the main body of Latter-day Saints coming to California, Brigham Young had chosen the Salt Lake Valley as the new center place for the Mormon population. Although uniting with the rest of the Mormon populace was still much desired, the Brooklyn settlers lacked resources to undertake an 800-mile overland journey and start their lives over.

Within three months, funding for a second migration became possible when gold was discovered at Coloma (January 24, 1848). Brannan publicized the rich finds locally in his newspaper and sent riders with a special edition back east, spurring the California Gold Rush. He operated lucrative trading posts for miners, while most of the Brooklyn pioneers worked placer mines along the American River. With the gold they unearthed, by July 1849, about half of the Brooklyn pioneers outfitted wagons and headed over the Sierras to Salt Lake City on a new route built by veterans of the Mormon Battalion. Their Mormon Emigrant Trail through Carson Pass became the main route west for gold seekers to reach the mining regions.

In 1851, church leaders from Utah recruited about half of the remaining Brooklyn pioneers to build another Mormon colony at San Bernardino, California. Two Brooklyn Saints went to the Sandwich Islands, while most of the rest returned to their lives in the eastern states.

== Background ==
=== The Mormon exodus ===
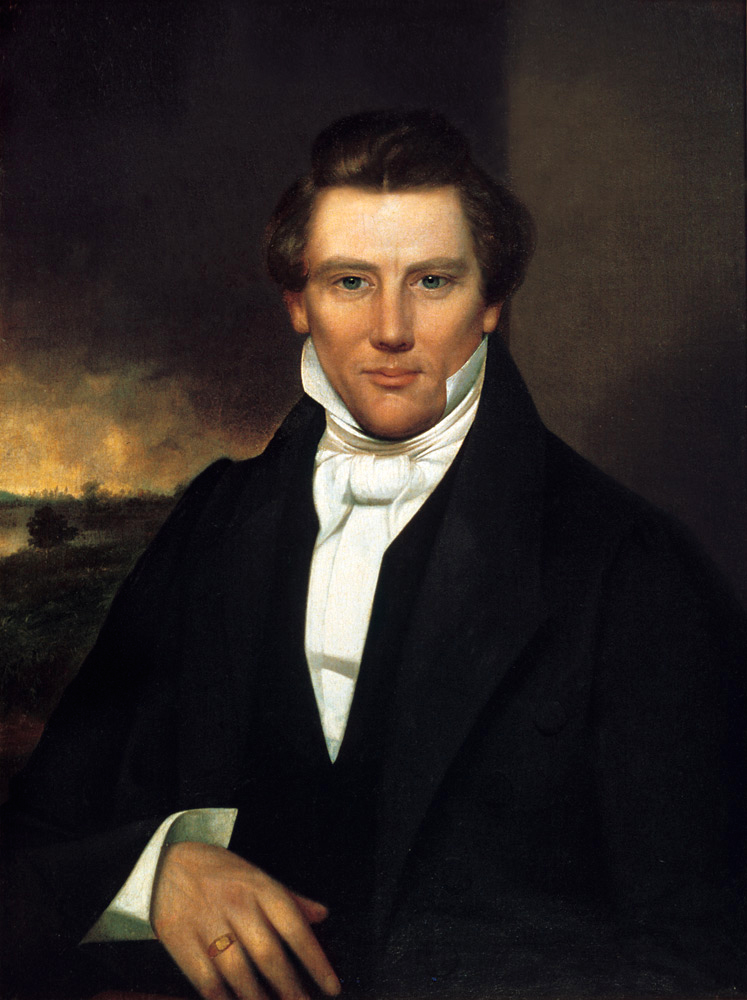
Joseph Smith

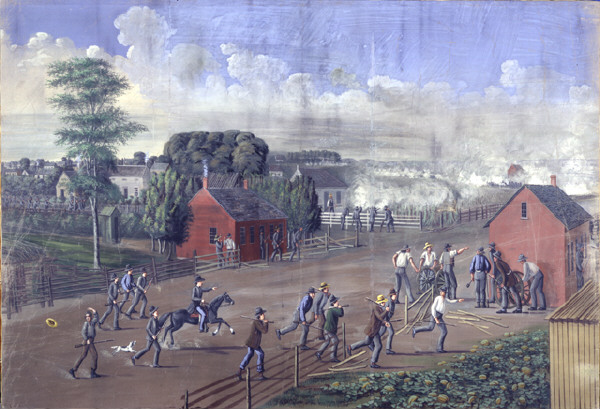
The Battle of Nauvoo, by C. C. A. Christensen

The 1846 maritime migration of the Brooklyn pioneers was part of the larger Mormon exodus from the Eastern United States to the Salt Lake Valley. For over a decade, members of the LDS Church had been subjected to voter suppression, property destruction, looting, rape, tar and feather attacks, mob violence, massacre, and finally the death of Joseph Smith, the church founder. Leaders of the church repeatedly sought assistance from local, state and federal officials to deal with the abuses. Despite pleas for law enforcement, government officials rarely intervened to protect Latter-day Saint settlements, citing a difficult political situation or openly siding with anti-Mormon mobs. Efforts at self-defense made matters worse. Mormon communities moved from place to place seeking a safe environment.

==== Government response ====
Brigham Young received a letter from Illinois Governor Thomas Ford, dated 8 April 1845, advising him to find a new home for his people, suggesting that they establish an independent colony in Alta California (modern Utah, Nevada, Arizona, and California), where they could live and worship as they pleased. Before doing so, President Young vainly requested asylum in Arkansas from its Governor Drew, who refused them. The governor suggested that they go to Oregon Territory, Alta California, the Republic of Texas, or Nebraska Territory. However, Orson Hyde wrote, "most of the settlers in Oregon and Texas are our old enemies, the mobocrats of Missouri ... and should we attempt to march to Oregon without the government throwing a protective shield over us, Missouri's crimes would lead her first to misinterpret our intentions [and] ... to fan a flame too hot for us to encounter." A delegation sent to Washington, D.C. in March 1844 requested authorization for a "protective shield" of 100,000 armed volunteers, but such an action was deemed likely to provoke international complications with Great Britain. Illinois Congressman Stephen A. Douglas, an ally of James K. Polk, privately provided the Latter-day Saint delegation with a map of Oregon and a copy of Frémont's path-finding report. Douglas urged church leaders "not to wait for government action but to strike out for Oregon, and if at the end of five years Congress would not receive [them] into the Union, [they] would have a government of [their] own."

=== Planning the exodus ===
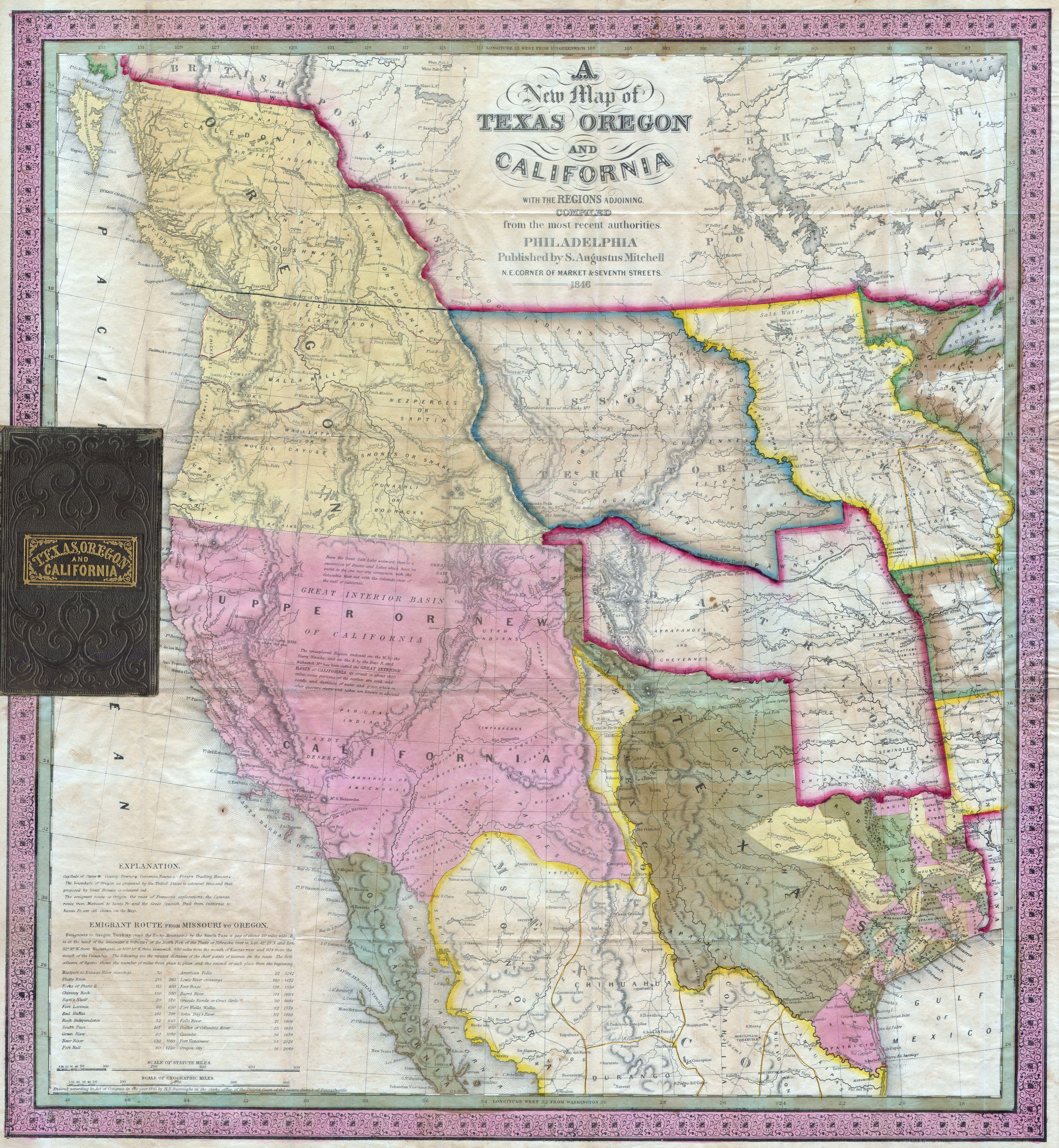
Brigham Young used this 1846 map to navigate across the Plains to the Valley of the Great Salt Lake.

In the years preceding the Mormon exodus, Joseph Smith and other church leaders made repeated attempts to engage local, state, and federal authorities in protecting them from mob attacks, in obtaining restitution for damaged or stolen property, and in supporting their Constitutional right to freedom of worship. Generally such assistance was not forthcoming. Instead, Smith was frequently charged with various forms of troublemaking or inciting unrest. Governor Ford and President Martin Van Buren each responded that they were unable or unwilling to act in favor of the Latter-day Saints because of strong popular sentiment against the sect. Although national leaders were aware of the injustices done to the Latter-day Saint population, which numbered close to 200,000 at the time, other matters of economic recovery and sectionalism had their attention. (Note: Democrats were losing to the Whigs. The country had not yet recovered economically from the Panic of 1837. The first abolitionist was elected to Congress and the Underground Railroad began operations as sectional conflict heated up. The Cherokee were expelled along the Trail of Tears and shifting frontier populations required new governance. Joseph Smith attempted to bring issues of religious freedom and states rights into the national discourse by running for President of the United States, but he was murdered by a mob in Carthage, Illinois.) After Smith's death, church members re-grouped and determined to re-settle outside the United States. The voyage of the ship Brooklyn was part of that re-settlement effort.

Brigham Young announced on September 16, 1845, that the Latter-day Saints would abandon their headquarters city of Nauvoo, Illinois, in the spring (when prairie vegetation, necessary to feed livestock during overland travel, would be growing).

== Expedition to Alta California ==
At that time, the Great Basin was part of Alta California, a sparsely populated region, nominally under the jurisdiction of Mexico, but primarily occupied by indigenous people (Ute, Dine' (Navajo), Paiute, Goshute, and Shoshone). Young intended to move church members in stages and in separate wagon trains, with earlier groups establishing farms and temporary settlements along the way to feed and support the wagon companies to follow. The ship Brooklyn could carry heavy items the main migration would need in their new location, such as mill stones for grain, hundreds of farm implements, and a printing press.

Joseph Smith had spoken about moving the church beyond the Rocky Mountains as early as 1842. Serious efforts to identify an optimal location were made between 1842 and 1845. Since constitutionally guaranteed protections under the law were not being enforced in the U.S., the intention was to transplant the main "gathering place" for Latter-day Saints outside the country. During the October 1845 general conference, the exodus was announced to church members at Nauvoo, Illinois. Mormons around the globe were urged to prepare for the move "to a far distant region of the west" where they would not encounter the hostility previously experienced. The following month a regional meeting was held in American Hall in New York on November 15, 1845. Orson Pratt, a member of the Council of the Twelve governing body, visited the eastern states to urge all church members to evacuate from the country. Those living in the Atlantic states were advised that it would be quicker, cheaper, and safer to sail to California around Cape Horn than to travel overland.

=== Samuel Brannan ===
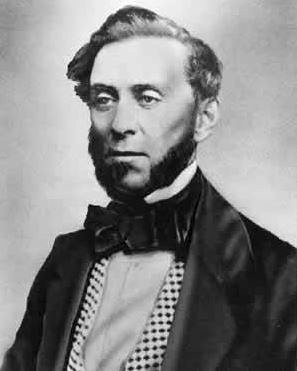
Samuel Brannan

At the New York conference, Samuel Brannan was named to lead the shipload of Mormon immigrants to the West—despite an earlier difficulty with the church hierarchy that had resulted in his being excommunicated for a short time. Brannan sought to be restored to church membership and to prove himself to those in leadership positions. He was allowed to serve as editor of a church newspaper under the supervision of apostle Parley P. Pratt. With most leaders recalled to the church headquarters to organize the cross country exodus, Brannan was called upon to lead the Brooklyn expedition. The potential for further violent incidents on shore and the desire to avoid the storm season at Cape Horn determined the departure date window. There was only a short time to make all the arrangements and recruit settlers for the voyage. Over the next three weeks, Brannan spoke in Philadelphia, New Jersey, Boston, New Haven, Washington City (D.C.) and New York to raise money and register passengers. The ship Brooklyn was chartered and converted from a cargo vessel to an immigrant ship. Using church funds, William Appleby purchased tents and other items the pioneers would need. The ship Brooklyn was loaded with hundreds of agricultural tools, mechanical supplies, and large items like grist mill stones and a printing press to lay the groundwork for the new colony in the West. Brannan had the voyage organized by the end of January 1846. Historian H. H. Bancroft described Brannan as "an erratic genius", energetic and able, shrewd in business, "famous for his acts of charity", but given to strong drink in his later years.

The plan was for the maritime company and the overland immigrants to ultimately unite. When the main body of Latter-day Saints reached their new gathering place a year later, a food supply and important resources could be provided by the pre-positioned Brooklyn pioneers. To minimize anticipated outside interference, Brigham Young did not publicly disclose the final destination. Brannan was informed, but had discretion to select a suitable location for the Brooklyn pioneers upon arrival. Prioritizing business opportunities, Brannan told the passengers they would settle on the shores of the Pacific. When the overland migration reached the Salt Lake Valley, Brigham Young prioritized the establishment of a unified, theocratic community in a location that would remain free from outside interference.

=== Politically connected consortium ===
While the government was unwilling to be seen helping the Mormon cause, ambitious businessmen and powerful politicians saw the Mormon plight as leverage to serve their own interests. Prior to the Brooklyn's sailing, Samuel Brannan was contacted by a consortium of powerful Washington insiders. Amos Kendall and the Benson brothers demanded title to half of all lands settled by members of the church in the West. In exchange, they proposed to use their influence to restrain those who wanted to forcibly halt or disarm the Mormon migration. Church members could not safely remain in the U.S., but they might not be permitted to leave en masse. Crossing the national boundary into Mexico in such numbers might be interpreted as an armed invasion, especially while the annexation of Texas was such an incendiary issue. In an 1888 retrospective account of the voyage (which may have inaccuracies), Brannan claimed that when he spoke to the Mexican Consul about their intentions, the Consul replied that the Brooklyn "would be sunk before it reached the island of Cuba." Nonetheless, the voyage took place. Brooklyn's sailing was delayed while Brannan waited for Brigham Young/s response to the Kendall/Benson demands – a response that never came. Urged by Captain Richardson to delay sailing no longer, the ship finally departed from New York on February 4, 1846, without incident.

=== International chess moves ===
Brooklyn's voyage took place in the midst of international maneuvering to possess territory and harbors on the west coast of North America. California was highly vulnerable to takeover by different countries at the time. The arrival of large numbers of American settlers by land and by sea could serve U.S. president, James K. Polk's strategic objectives as the United States vied with Great Britain and France for control of the Pacific coast.

Internal unrest and limited resources kept the Mexican government from using and managing distant Alta California, from which it had largely withdrawn after 1834 or been forcibly expelled by 1846. Powerful Californios in the distant territory rejected various governors sent by central Mexico to rule them. The Californios declared themselves independent unless Mexico returned to prior constitutional guarantees. However, they lacked the ability to defend the territory against even a small force on their own. Mexico offered to sell Alta California to Great Britain, hoping to make it a British protectorate against the United States, but Britain was reluctant to risk another war with the United States. An additional uncertainty was the effect John Sutter's financial challenges might have in de-stabilizing northern California. Potential international complications could arise if his finances collapsed, an outcome that was deemed highly likely given his history. If Sutter could not fulfill contractual obligations in the purchase of Fort Ross from the Russian-American Company, he could take down important Californios' fortunes with him and re-introduce Russian dominion from the coast into the Central Valley. Sutter resisted government attempts to control him and the looming risk he presented, falsely claiming that he would have the military backing of France if Californios attempted to interfere with him.

Polk had campaigned on acquiring sole jurisdiction over Oregon Country, which had been jointly administered with the United Kingdom since the Treaty of 1818, and on gaining sovereignty over the San Francisco Bay. Major harbors were crucial for the increasingly valuable trade with China and the Sandwich Islands trans-shipment point. Polk and his predecessors actively promoted American settlement in Oregon Country, overcoming British claims with the sheer number of American settlers present. The ship Brooklyn was carrying Americans to the San Francisco Bay; having large numbers of American Mormons settle in the San Francisco Bay area could be advantageous to the United States, whether in negotiations or in armed conflict. American Consul Thomas O. Larkin and Lansford Hastings communicated about the approach of thousands of American Mormons overland and their impact on the ambitions of Californios, the English, and French. Government officials, as well as private concerns, attempted to manipulate the Mormon migration to the West. While the Latter-day Saint population was trying to flee United States jurisdiction, the country was trying to take over the land to which they were fleeing before some other nation did.

Thousands of Latter-day Saints were migrating into Mexican territory. Some government officials questioned whether the Mormon grievances had antagonized the Saints enough that the Mormons would side with Mexico or Great Britain in the forthcoming Mexican–American War. In part to address that issue, President Polk authorized the enlistment of 500 men from migrating Mormon wagon trains on the plains into General Stephen Watts Kearny's Army of the West. Enlisting the Mormon Battalion so formed was intended to assure that church members would align themselves with the United States in the upcoming conflict. On the far side of the continent, ship Brooklyn passengers would be interviewed by a naval commander at Honolulu regarding their allegiance and intentions before being allowed to sail into the San Francisco Bay. In November 1845, Polk secretly sent orders to the Navy's Pacific Squadron to treat any incident threatening American settlers as a cause for "defensive" warfare. Captain John C. Frémont and his Topographical Engineers were instructed to instigate such a Mexican threat to settlers. Without the knowledge of the ship Brooklyn passengers, the United States and Mexico were engaged in the Mexican–American War (April 25, 1846 – February 2, 1848) for three months before the ship arrived.

=== Maritime migration ===
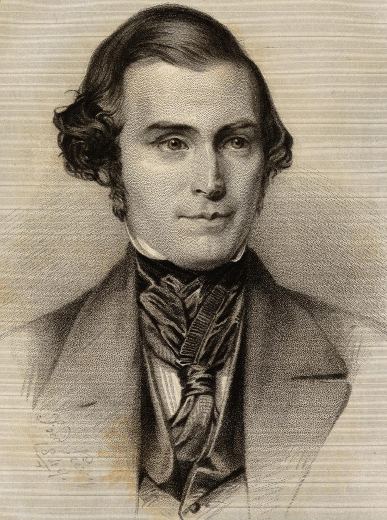
Orson Pratt

==== Recruiting seaborne settlers ====
In November 1845, Parley P. Pratt, a member of the church's Council of the Twelve, wrote Samuel Brannan, saying, "Our apostles, assembled in meeting, have debated the best method of getting all our people into the far west with the least possible hardship. We have read Hasting's account of California and Fremont's Journal of Explorations in the west, and we have concluded that the Great Basin in the top of the Rocky Mountains, where lies the Great Salt Lake, is the proper place for us." Brannan was authorized to charter a ship and organize the exodus of church members from New York City and the Atlantic coast. On the evening of November 8, 1845, Latter-day Saints from neighboring states attended a major conference to hear the Apostle Orson Pratt speak at American Hall in New York City. Pratt explained "the necessity of all removing to the west" by land or by sea, urging "a union of action for the benefit of the poor, that they might not be left behind."

The LDS Church had been organizing immigrant voyages for European converts for many years, and had developed an international reputation for their expertise in doing so. Brannan was assigned to organize the first shipload of Latter-day Saint immigrants to "Zion" – the new "gathering place" for the Mormon population. In a voyage anticipated to take five or six months, families would sail from New York around Cape Horn to Alta California. Recounting their numerous persecutions, Samuel Brannan urged conference attendees to resolve to leave the US. Fifty people promptly subscribed on behalf of themselves and their families to take the voyage. However, getting affairs in order, selling businesses and homes, paying the charter fees, and being ready to start life over in a short time was a task not all could accomplish. Sixteen families who subscribed in advance did not sail with the Brooklyn when the time came, but forty-eight additional surnames were added to the final passenger list as word spread. (Note: Other parties donated funds to assist those who lacked the means to go. William Stout and William Atherton received financial assistance for their passage. In early December, Brannan sought government financing for the expedition, which did not materialize. Neither did an arrangement with A.G. Benson to "take two hundred of us at sixteen dollars per ton for the room we occupy and fifty more for nothing.") About 60% of those who actually sailed had not subscribed by December 13, 1845. When the departure call came, 238 people boarded the ship – about 60 more than the legal passenger limit would allow.

=== Expansionists and opportunists ===
==== Amos Kendall and the Benson brothers ====
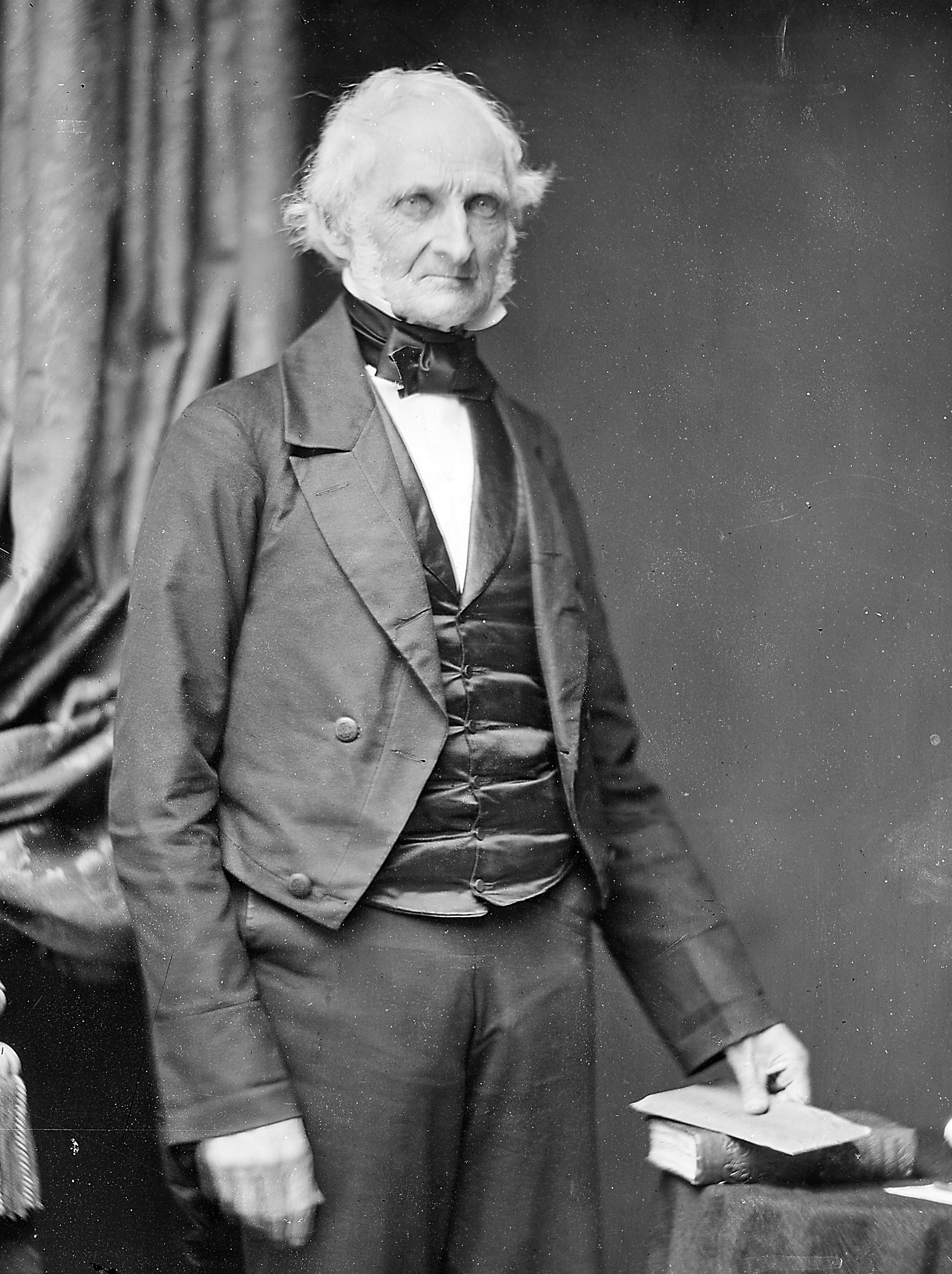
Amos Kendall

In July 1845, Brannan advertised in The Messenger that his establishment would serve as an emigrating office for Mormons in the East who wished to travel to the West. That summer in New York, Brannan met with western expansionist Amos Kendall, one of the most powerful men in Washington; author Thomas Jefferson Farnham; and, with A. W. Benson and A. G. Benson, naval contractors and commercial traders. They claimed to represent a larger group of powerful interests in Washington, D.C., including President Polk as a "silent partner." Samuel Brannan wrote to Brigham Young about the proposition, claiming to have "learned that the secretary of war and other members of the cabinet were laying plans and were determined to prevent the Mormons from moving west, alleging that it was against the law for an armed body of men to go from the United States to any other government. They say it will not do to let the Mormons go to California nor Oregon, neither will it do to let them tarry in the states, and they must be obliterated from the face of the earth." Based on Brannan's letters, Young wrote in his diary on January 29, 1846, "that the Government intended to intercept our movements—by placing strong forces in the way to take from us all fire arms—on the grounds that we were going to another Nation."

However, Kendall and Benson assured Brannan that they "would undertake to prevent all interference if the Mormon leaders would sign an agreement 'to transfer to A. G. Benson & Co. the odd numbers of all the lands and town lots they may acquire in the country where they may settle.'" Brigham Young considered the offer a swindle and rejected it outright. However, his decision did not reach Brannan before the Brooklyn sailed. No direct evidence has yet turned up, but it is possible that Brannan was much involved in the conspiracy, "an 1840s-style covert operation whose aim was the conquest of California." Brannan corresponded with the Benson brothers and had business dealings with them after the voyage. Whatever the real story was, Brannan represented to Brigham Young and to the Brooklyn passengers that the government threat was serious and that their departure was delayed, waiting for instructions from the church leadership. Meanwhile, as a ruse, Brannan spread word that the ship might be sailing for Oregon rather than California. A pennant declaring "Oregon" was flown from the ship's mast. Conversion of the chartered vessel to serve as an immigrant ship was complete and only a few registered passengers had not yet arrived. Captain Richardson finally pressed for departure, having delayed long enough.

==== Western expansionists ====
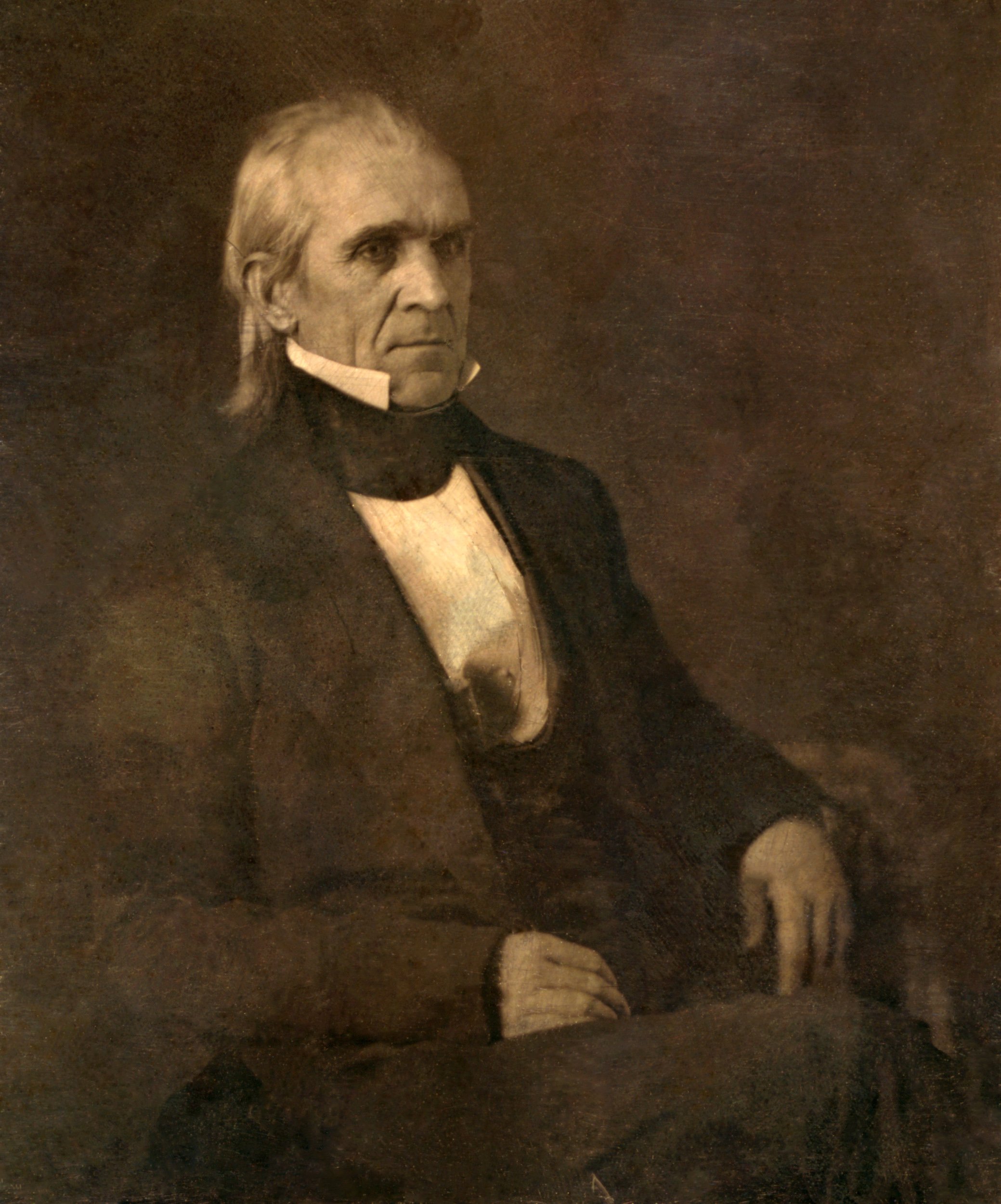
James K. Polk

Several western expansionists had an impact on the situation the Brooklyn settlers encountered upon arrival. President Polk instructed Thomas O. Larkin, the American Consul in California, to encourage pro-American sentiment among the Hispanic population. Many influential Californios, particularly in the north, were inclined toward Americans. Larkin enlisted John Marsh, a wealthy landowner in the Sacramento-San Joaquin River Delta, to encourage western migration among his contacts in the eastern states. Like others, Marsh entertained notions of becoming President of an independent republic of California. He engaged in a letter-writing campaign to friends and publishers back east, extolling the virtues of California and inviting settlers to join him. The Bartleson-Bidwell wagon train to California was organized in response. A number of ambitious men saw opportunity and tried to position themselves for power and influence in the West. Farnham, author of books on Oregon and California, visited Apostle Orson Pratt multiple times to urge Mormon migration to California near him. Captain Lansford Hastings, leader of the 1842 emigration to Oregon and California, wrote a pro-California guide book from which Samuel Brannan printed pages in the New-York Messenger, 1 November 1845 issue.

To initiate his strategy to take Alta California, U.S. President Polk sent secret orders in November 1845 to the Pacific Squadron and to Captain John C. Frémont via Archibald Gillespie, who carried the messages covertly across Mexico. President Polk's expansionist aspirations were shared by Missouri Senator Thomas Hart Benton, chairman of the Senate Committee on Military Affairs and a strong believer in America's manifest destiny. Benton's son-in-law was John C. Frémont, the famed "Pathfinder" who led the land-based military campaign to take over California during the Mexican–American War. Senator Benton and Frémont were opposed to Mormons, but were willing to use them in bringing about the conquest of the West. Frémont had instructions to instigate an incident that would require the intervention of the U.S. Navy to defend American settlers in Alta California. In early June, American settlers took actions that came to be known as the Bear Flag Revolt. Frémont formed a California Battalion, which they joined. On July 1, Captain Frémont led a party that disabled the Mexican presidio cannon overlooking the entrance to the San Francisco Bay. By so doing, the threat to the Brooklyn was eliminated before the ship sailed into the bay. A few of the Brooklyn passengers joined Frémont's California Battalion and fought in southern California.

== Ship Brooklyn ==
Built by the firm of J. & M. Madigan of Newcastle, Maine, in 1834, the Brooklyn was a full rigged merchantman with a mackerel bow; it was 125 feet long and 28 feet across the beams, with a 445-ton cargo capacity. Brooklyn's black hull contrasted with a wide, white stripe above the water line, emphasizing faux gun ports, set off by a horn of plenty figurehead beneath the bowsprit. Samuel Brannan promoted the chartered vessel in the New-York Messenger as "a first class ship, in the best of order for sea ... a very fast sailor". However, the voyage occurred at a turning point in maritime capability. The first extreme clipper, the Rainbow, was launched from the Smith and Dimon Shipyard two miles up river from Brooklyn's berth at the Old Slip on the East River, returning from China in an astonishingly short time just months before the Saints sailed. Years later, the Brooklyn was described by passenger James Skinner as a "staunch tub of a whaler", Augusta Joyce Crocheron's retrospective account of the voyage said the ship was "old and almost worn out, ... one of the old time build ... made more for work than beauty". Clipper ships were much faster than the older packet ships and merchantmen. Rainbow's successor, the Sea Witch, made an 1850 run from New York around Cape Horn to San Francisco in 97 days. The same route took Brooklyn 5 months 27 days. By far the longest of the Latter-day Saint voyages, Brooklyn's passage from New York took two months longer than passage from Calcutta, India, or Sydney, Australia.

The Brooklyn was converted from its prior role as a cargo ship to serve as a chartered passenger vessel. (Note: Brooklyn previously carried cargo and a limited number of passengers around the British Isles. The ship was involved in a fatal collision with the Mary Scott, Captain Sadler, on May 9, 1841, during a squall in the English Channel. According to the Liverpool Mercury, the Brooklyn struck the Mary Scott and eight men died as the smaller ship sank within minutes. Captain Abel W. Richardson reported Brooklyn lost her "bowsprit, cutwater, stem badly split, bows much injured; and at the time of the collision, and for 2 hours afterwards, I had strong fears of my ship springing a large leak suddenly, as in addition to the injury just sustained, her bowsprit was thrashing her bows sufficiently to cause great anxiety for the safety of the 195 souls on board; also the foremast was much endangered from the want of head stays.") The fare was set at $75 for adults and half price for children. On the main deck, first class cabins stood next to the captain's cabin. The ship's galley topside was expanded to serve as many as 400 passengers at a time. A small shelter was provided for two milch cows, intended to supply the needs of the children. Pens were built for chickens and forty pigs. Passenger accommodations were added on the 'tween deck where the headroom was 5'6" – even less when ducking under deck-supporting timbers. Thirty-two "staterooms" with double bunks were built along the interior walls of the hull. It was customary for passengers to supply their own ticking and blankets. A long, narrow table, with edges raised to contain sliding objects, ran most of the length of the passenger deck. Meals, meetings, and daily schooling of the children were to take place in that "Hall". Two sets of galley stairs descended from the main deck. Extra ventilation and skylights were added to augment windsail air. At night the glimmer of two whale oil lamps lit the way for passengers to move around safely on the 'tween deck. Additional sleeping quarters in the form of hammocks were set up on the orlop in the hold for single men.

=== Captain and crew ===
Crew of the ship Brooklyn
			Age
Captain	Abel W. Richardson	b. Massachusetts	-
1st Mate	Joseph W. Richardson	b. New York	27
2nd Mate	James W. Norskell	b. Massachusetts	27
Carpenter	John Thomas	b. Wales	30
Seaman	Benjamin R. Austin	b. Rhode Island	20
Seaman	Curtis Child	b. Connecticut	21
Seaman	Daniel Clark	b. New York	31
Seaman	Thomas Clauson	b. Sweden	25
Seaman	Charles Johnson	b. Sweden	26
Seaman	William Mays	b. New York	31
Seaman	John Edward Miles	b. North Carolina	28
Seaman	James Nichols	b. Maryland	21
Seaman	Martin S. Penfield	b. Connecticut	20
Seaman	Albert Stewart	b. Michigan	23
Seaman	Lewis A. Wilmot	b. Rhode Island	20
Steward	William Smith	b. Long Island	26
Cook	Joseph Newbury	b. Connecticut	24
Cook	Nathan N. Collins	b. New York	37

On this voyage, Brooklyn's Master and Captain was 48-year-old Abel W. Richardson, a principal owner of the ship. Brannan described him as one of the most skillful seamen sailing out of New York, a temperance man with excellent moral character. Passenger John Horner confirmed that Captain Richardson, his mates, and sailors "in morals seemed above the average. Unbecoming language was seldom heard on board." The captain was a Baptist who held religious services each week, which the passengers and crew attended. The crew consisted of a First Mate, (Note: The captain's nephew, Joseph W. Richardson, was First Mate on the 1846 voyage. He later captained the Brooklyn on a second voyage from New York to California in 1849. His ill treatment of passengers on the second voyage resulted in unnecessary suffering, disability, and deaths from scurvy, precipitating a sensational court case at journey's end.) Second Mate, and carpenter, a steward and cook for the officers and first class passengers, another cook and steward for the rest of the passengers, and twelve seamen. The crew averaged 26 years of age. Seamen earned $11 per month, with stewards and cooks earning a little more. The First and Second Mate earned $35 and $20 per month respectively.

=== Passengers ===
Ten lists of Brooklyn's passengers have emerged with minor variations. (Note: A leading reference on the voyage is Lorin K. Hansen's 1988 Dialogue article, which includes an appendix naming 234 passengers leaving New York. The most detailed compilation of biographical data on the passengers yielded 242 passengers, the product of Richard H. Bullock and Lu Markham Jones' research.) The general consensus is that Brooklyn sailed with 238 passengers—60 more passengers than the legal limit of two passengers for every five tons. Among the 70 men, 68 women and 100 children, 50 children were less than six years old. (Note: The passengers would have been aware of serious risks, but were determined to go. In the 1840s, over 40% of American children died by the age of five.) Thirty were infants or toddlers age three and under. There were three recorded births and eleven deaths by journey's end.

Based on data from Richard Bullock's biographical sketches, the Brooklyn's male passengers were largely farmers, mechanics, and tradesmen from the eastern states. Most men were traveling with their families—some with collateral branches of their families or with in-laws. Five families sent one or more of their kin by ship while the remaining family members crossed the continent by wagon train. Fourteen men traveled without other family members. Four were not members of the Church of Jesus Christ of Latter-day Saints, one of whom joined the ship in Honolulu to marry a Brooklyn passenger after a whirlwind island romance. Three of the single men traveled for business—two as first class passengers and one, Edward Kemble, as Brannan's printing apprentice. Two passengers were journalists and publishers, two wrote poetry collections, and one authored a book on national finance. Angeline Lovett, Olive Coombs, Quartus Sparks and John Horner were teachers. Daniel Stark brought manuals and tools to teach himself how to be a surveyor during the voyage.

Of the nine single women on board, five knew one another from working at the Lowell factories before the voyage. One young single woman, Zelnora Snow, traveled with the Glover family as nanny for their children. An enterprising 38-year-old Scottish dressmaker was traveling alone. Two single women sailed with younger generations of their kin, and one traveled with her sister's family. Emmaline Lane married George Sirrine, a fellow voyager, as soon as the ship landed.

Passenger list by family group
Family	Passengers	Notes
Addison	Isaac Addison, Eliza Addison, Elizabeth R. Addison	
Aldrich	Silas Aldrich, Prudence Hubbard Clark Aldrich, Nancy Laura Aldrich, Jason Aldrich	Silas died on voyage; Nancy Laura married fellow passenger Alondus Buckland after arrival
Atherton	William Atherton, Emily Atherton	
Austin	Julius Augustus Caesar Austin, Octavia Ann Lane Austin (wife), Louise Maria Austin, Edwin Nelson Austin, Newton Francis Austin	
Bird		(see Stark family)
Brannan	Samuel Brannan, Ann Eliza Corwin Brannan, Samuel L. Brannan	
Buckland	Hannah Daggett Buckland, Alondus de Lafayette Buckland	Hannah was divorced from an abusive husband; Alondus married fellow passenger Nancy Laura Aldrich after arrival
Bullen	Newell Francis Ebenezer Bullen, Clarissa Judkins Atkinson Bullen, Francis Andrew Bullen, Herschel Bullen, Cincinnatus Bullen	
Burr	Nathan Burr, Chloe Clark Burr, Amassa Burr, Charles Clark Burr, Sarah Sloat Burr, Charles Elias Washington Burr, John Atlantic Burr	Charles E. W. died on voyage; John born on voyage
Cade	Jonathan Cade, Susannah Henacaky Cade	
Clark	Sophia Patterson Clark	Single; took care of two rescued Donner Party children
Coombs	Abraham Marion Coombs, Olive Olivia Curtis Coombs, Katherine Coombs, Charles Marion Coombs, Helen Mar Coombs	Katherine was the daughter of Abraham's first wife
Corwin	Fanny M. Corwin	Samuel Brannan's mother-in-law
Eagar	Lucy Buell Eagar (widow), John Eagar, Mary Eagar, Thomas Eagar, Arabella Eagar, William Eagar	
Ensign	Elias Ensign, Jerusha Taylor Ensign, Eliza Ensign, John Warren Ensign	Elias and Eliza died on voyage
Evans	William Evans, Hannah Roberts Hymes Benner Evans, Amanda Miller Evans, Jonathan Benner Evans, Parley Pratt Evans, William Hymes Evan	
Fisher	Joseph R. Fisher, Mary Ann Fisher	Brother and sister
Fowler	Jerusha H. Ensign Fowler, Thomas W. Fowler, George E. Fowler, John S. Fowler Jr., Charles D. Fowler	Jerusha's husband traveled overland; Charles D. died on voyage
Glover	William Glover Jr., Jane Cowan Glover, Jane Glover, Catherine Glover, Joseph Smith Glover	Joseph born on shore soon after landing
Goodwin	Isaac Goodwin, Laura Hotchkiss Goodwin, Isaac Hotchkiss Goodwin, Lewis Goodwin, Emerette Elizabeth Goodwin, Edwin Abijah Goodwin, Nancy Ellen Goodwin, Lucinda Ladelia Goodwin, Albert Story Goodwin, infant (name unknown)	Laura died on voyage after her infant died in a miscarriage
Griffith	Jonathan Griffith, Sarah Duncan McCullough Griffith, Fernanda Jackson Griffith, Henry Livingstone Marshall Griffith	
Hamilton	Mary Quigley Hamilton	Mother-in-law of Quartus Sparks
Harris	Henry Harris	Joined Brooklyn sailing out of Honolulu to marry passenger Mary Murray on board
Haskell	Ashbel Green Haskell	Family traveled overland; Ashbel died en route to reuniting
Hayes (Hayse)	Jacob Bert Hayes (Hayse)	Presumed single, little known
Hicks	Joseph Hicks	Single, little known
Hopkins		(see Smith family)
Horner	John Meirs Horner, Elizabeth Imlay Horner	Newlyweds; Elizabeth was known as the "Bride of the Brooklyn"
Hyatt	Elisha Hyatt, Matilda Smith Hyatt, John Smith (Defreeze) Hyatt	
Irey	Cyrus Irey	Single
Jamison		(see Read family)
Jones	Isabella Jones	Single; dressmaker
Joyce	John Joyce, Caroline Augusta Perkins Joyce, Augusta Joyce	Caroline took care of Donner Party survivors
Kemble	Edward Cleveland Kemble	Brannan's apprentice; not LDS
Kittleman	John Kittleman (presumed widower), Sarah Kittleman, George Kittleman, Thomas Kittleman	Thomas married Angeline M. Lovett in San Francisco.
Kittleman	William Kittleman, Eliza Hindman Kittleman (William's wife), Elizabeth Jane Kittleman, Mary Ann Kittleman, James H. Kittleman, George Kittleman, Sara Emma (Sally) Kittleman, Hannah Melinda Kittleman	William was John Kittleman's son. Sara and Sally were twins.
Knowles	Richard Knowles, Sarah Rostern Knowles	
Ladd (Johnson)	Samuel Greenleaf Ladd Jr. (alias Samuel Johnson)	Single
Lane	Emeline Amanda Lane	Youngest sister of Octavia Ann Lane Austin; married fellow passenger George Warren Sirrine at end of voyage
Leigh	Isaac Leigh, Aschah Hunt Leigh	
Light	James Light, Mary Jane Pearson Light, Mary Elizabeth Light	
Lovett	Angeline M Lovett	Married fellow passenger Thomas Kittleman in San Francisco
Marshall	Earl Marshall, Letitia Dorsey Marshall, Simeon Stivers	Simeon was a recently orphaned nephew, adopted by the Marshalls
McCue	Patrick McCue, Esther Burgoine McCue, James P. McCue, Solomon B. McCue, Amos W. McCue, William K. McCue	
Meder (Meader)	Moses A. Meder, Sarah D. Blood Meder, Angeline Meder	
Moses	Ambrose Todd Moses, Lydia Ensign Moses, Norman Stiles Moses, Phebe Maria Moses, Ann Frances Moses, Clarissa Cordelia Moses	
Mowry	Barton Mowry, Ruth Walkup Mowry, Origin Mowry, Rhanaldo Mowry	Another son, Harley, traveled overland with the Mormon Battalion
Murray	Mary Murray	Married Henry Harris on board ship after romance in Honolulu
Narrimore	Mercy Murray Day Hooker Narrimore, Edwin Henry Hooker	Mercy was a widow from the Indian wars; Edwin was her son
Nichols	Joseph A. Nichols, Sophia Jerusha Bull Nichols, Enos Sperry Nichols, Joseph Nichols Jr.	Joseph Jr. died on voyage
Nutting	Lucy Jane Nutting	Single
Oakley	Howard Oakley	Believed to be single; last of Donner Party rescuers.
Pell	Elijah Ward Pell, Seba "Mattie" Pell, Geraldine Eliza Pell, Hattie Cornelia Pell	Frank Ward was an unspecified cousin to the Pell family
Petch (Petz)	Robert Petch, Mary Petch, Salena Petch, Richard N. Petch	
Philips	John Philips	Single
Pool	Mary Frances Cramer Pool (widow), Elizabeth Margaret Frances Pool, Peter John Pool	
Read (Reed)	Christianna Nixon Gregory Read (widow), John Haines Read Jr., Christianna Rachel Read, Hannah Tucker Read, John Read Clark Jamison (Hannah's son)	Hannah's sea captain husband opposed LDS Church, tried to take their son away from Hannah, who hid son until voyage
Robbins	Isaac Rogers Robbins, Mary Ann Shinn Burtis Robbins, Ann Pacific Robbins, Joseph Reeves Robbins, Wesley Burtis Robbins, Margret Burtis Robbins	Isaac was the brother of Chauncy and John Robbins. Ann was born on ship, but died within hours.
Robbins	Chauncy Charles Robbins	Single; brother of Issac and John Robbins
Robbins	Dr. John Rogers Robbins, Phoebe Ann Wright Robbins, George Edward Robbins, John Franklin Robbins, Georgeanna "Anna" Pacific Robbins, Charles Burtis Robbins	John Rogers Robbins was the brother of Isaac and Chauncey Robbins. George and John Franklin died on voyage. Anna born on voyage. Charles was the son of first marriage to Mary Shinn Harper Burtis.
Rollins (Rowland)	Henry Rollins, Isaac Thomas Rollins	Henry was the father of Jane Tomkins. His wife and youngest son traveled overland.
Savage	Susan Eliza Savage	Single
Scott	James Scott	Single
Sirrine	George Warren Sirrine, John Sirrine (brother of George), Nancy Smith Sirrine (John's wife), George J. Sirrine (John and Nancy's son)	George Warren married fellow passenger Emeline Amanda Lane at end of voyage
Skinner	Horace Austin Skinner, Laura Ann Farnsworth Skinner, James Horace Skinner	
Smith	Orren (Orrin) E. Smith, Amy Ann Dowd Hopkins Smith, Elizabeth Bradley Smith, Henry M. Smith, Amelia Ann Smith, Francis (Frank) Erothis Smith, Ellen Mariah Hopkins, Emily Marilla Hopkins, Orren (Orrin) Hopkins Smith, Amy Ann Smith, Robert Smith, Catherine Clark Smith, Daniel Clark Smith, Hyrum Joseph Smith	Ellen and Emily were Amy's children from a previous marriage. Orrin, born to the Smiths in August 1845, died in Hawaii; Amy Ann Smith was born and died while Brooklyn was stopped in Hawaii.
Snow	Zelnora Sophronia Snow	Nanny to Glover children; later became William Glover's second wife
Sparks	Quartus Strong Sparks, Mary Holland Hamilton Sparks, Quartus Strong Sparks Jr.	Mary was the daughter of Mary Quigley Hamilton
Stark	Daniel Stark, Ann Cook Stark, John Daniel Stark, Elizabeth Wallace Bird	Elizabeth was transported and nursed by Ann when her mother died; later adopted by the Starks
Still	George Still, Mary Still, Sarah Still, Laura Still, Julia Still	
Stivers		(see Marshall family)
Stout	William Stout, Mary Ann Breckenridge Stout, Malone Stout	
Stringfellow	Jesse A Stringfellow	Single
Tomkins	Thomas King Tomkins, Jane E. Rollins Tomkins, Amanda Tomkins, Jane Elizabeth Tomkins	
Von Pfister	Edward H. Von Pfister	Not LDS; single, a sea captain, known as Von
Ward	W. Frank Ward	Not LDS; single; cousin to the Elijah Ward Pell family; Donner Party rescuer and fund raiser
Warner	Caroline M. Warner, Myron Warner, Sarah H. Warner, Henry J. Warner	Caroline's husband traveled overland, never reunited
Winner	George King Winner, Hanna P. Winner, Mary Ann Winner, Elizabeth "Lizzie" Winner, Louisa Winner, Emojine Winner, Moroni Winner, Israel J Winner, Sarah Winner, Deborah Adalade Winner	Mary Ann and Elizabeth were twins; Sarah died on voyage; Deborah born on shore soon after landing

Note: Lorin Hansen also names George Hyde as another passenger picked up in Honolulu, plus Honolulu stowaways William Taylor and John Stanley, who were returned in irons.

== Final preparations and departure ==
At a farewell social gathering shortly before sailing, a prominent New York attorney and literary society president named Joshua M. Van Cott presented the group with 179 volumes of Harper's Family Library, a collection covering topics including history, cultures, narratives by world explorers, philosophy, natural history, science, economics, law, and literature. With little else to occupy the passengers for six months, the books were widely circulated. According to a letter written three months into the voyage, every one of the volumes had been read before the ship reached the Juan Fernández Islands.

Passengers were urged to get their belongings to the dock well in advance. Families began arriving toward the end of January. The Brooklyn's departure was originally scheduled for January 24, 1846, but the ship was not quite ready and some registered passengers were still on route to the port. The voyagers stayed in nearby boarding houses until the ship sailed. Trying to avoid publicity or outside interference with their departure, Brannan advised the voyagers not to refer to one another as Brother or Sister, a common Latter-day Saint form of address. John Horner and Elizabeth Imlay married on January 20 in New Jersey, and left for the New York harbor the next day, spending their honeymoon on the ship. On January 21, Laura Farnsworth Skinner gave birth to Laura Ann Skinner, who lived a mere eight days. Eight other women were pregnant when the voyage began. (Note: An infant was born to "Horace Austin Skinner and Laura Farnsworth in New York City on 21 January 1846. She was named Laura Ann Skinner. The child struggled with life and died on 28 January, only living for eight days." Sarah Sloat Burr commenced the voyage at nearly full term. Her son, John Atlantic Burr was born February 24, three weeks after leaving port. Laura Goodwin suffered a fall on the galley steps during the second gale of the voyage, miscarried, and died May 6, leaving behind her husband and seven children. She was buried on Más a Tierra. In mid-June, Mary Ann Shinn Burtis Robbins, age 35, delivered a little girl they named Anna Pacific Robbins. Unfortunately, the baby lived only a few hours, and was buried at sea. Mary Ann's sister-in-law, Phoebe Ann Wright Robbins, age 34, also began the voyage five months pregnant. Georgeanna Pacific Robbins was born on June 16, just a few days after Mary Ann Robbins' baby, as the ship was approaching the Sandwich Islands. Amy Ann Dowd Hopkins Smith was 35 at the commencement of the voyage. The third week of July, her baby girl, Amy Ann Smith, was born about seven months into the pregnancy. Her youngest boy, Orrin Hopkins Smith, was suffering from malnutrition by the time the ship reached the Sandwich Islands. The family decided to stay in Honolulu for the birth of the baby and until all recovered their health, then continue on to California. However, Orrin, not quite one year old, died July 15, 1846. His new baby sister, Amy Ann Smith, died soon thereafter, exact date unknown. The rest of the family caught a later ship sailing to California, arriving in October. Jane Glover became pregnant shortly before the voyage to California. Their son, William Francisco Glover, was born September 25, 1846. He was the first American child born in San Francisco after the United States takeover of the Bay Area. Matilda Smith Hyatt delivered a daughter they named Helen Hyatt shortly after arrival in San Francisco. Helen is listed as 14 years old, born in California, in a July 3, 1860 census. Hanna Winner delivered a daughter in late 1846 who they named Deborah Adalade.) Two delivered healthy babies mid-voyage and survived, but three newborns died at sea or while pausing in the Sandwich Islands. Three more mothers delivered their babies shortly after arrival in California. (Note: In the California State Census of 1852, Emily Combs, then the youngest daughter of Abraham and Olivia Coombs, is shown as age 6, born in San Francisco, and living in Napa. The Coombs family helped to colonize San Bernardino.)

Homes and businesses had been quickly sold and property disposed. Parting from loved ones was difficult with families fearing they might never see one another again. Several passengers experienced difficulties with extended family members who objected to their kin migrating to the far side of the continent with an out-of-favor religious group. The uncle of Katherine Coombs (daughter of Abraham Coombs by his first wife) did not want to lose his favorite niece, so he concocted a false charge and got the police to arrest Abraham on the dock while he kidnapped the girl. Abraham was able to draw enough attention to his plight that other Brooklyn passengers came to his aid, foiling the dockside drama. The family was then able to board the ship. When Isaac and Ann Robbins were bidding farewell to her parents, Ann's father drove her husband off at rifle point, forcibly detaining Ann and the children so they would not go. With the help of other family members a few days later, Ann and the children managed to escape on foot across snowy New Jersey back roads, making their way across the state to reunite with Isaac just before Brooklyn sailed.

Prior to departure, a schedule and twenty-one rules for daily conduct were agreed upon, although they were not fully implemented for some time. Days consisted of reveille at 6 am, cleaning of staterooms, inspections, sick call, meals served in two seatings, school for the children, religious services on Sundays, with people assigned on a rotating basis to watch over belongings and food supplies, and much free time. Standards of dress and hygiene were to be observed. With 100 children on board, many of them infants and toddlers, child care was a constant occupation.

On the afternoon of February 4, 1846, the steamboat tug Sampson drew Brooklyn away from the East River dock. A pennant atop the mast proclaimed the ship was headed for Oregon. The pilot conducted Brooklyn through the shifting Narrows to Sandy Hook, passing without interference under the "bristling guns" of Fort Hamilton.

== Atlantic passage ==
=== Gale ===
The second day out, there were heavy seas. Soon after crossing the Gulf Stream on February 10, the ship was forced to lay-to in a heavy gale, struggling for four days. The experienced captain feared his cabin on the upper deck would be swept away, allowing waves to pour down to the lower decks. The ship would be lost. Hatched below with poor ventilation and little light, most passengers were desperately seasick. Women and children were lashed to bunks to reduce injuries caused by the violent movements of the ship. The masts remained intact as passengers sang hymns to bolster spirits.

William Glover later wrote of the storm, "Some who were more resolute struggled to the deck to behold the sublime grandeur of the scene – to hear the dismal howl of the winds, and to see the ship with helm lashed, pitching, rolling, dipping in the trough of the sea and then tossed on the highest billow. These are sights once beheld are never to be forgotten."

The story is often told that the captain finally came down to address the passengers, saying, "My friends, there is a time in every man's life when it is fitting that he should prepare to die. That time has come to us, and unless God interposes, we shall all go to the bottom; I have done all in my power, but this is the worst gale I have ever known since I was a master of a ship." One passenger replied, "Captain Richardson, we were sent to California and we shall get there." Another exclaimed, "Captain, I have no more fear than though we were on solid land." The captain stared in disbelief at such remarks and was heard to say in leaving, "They are either fools and fear nothing, or they know more than I do." (Note: Augusta Joyce Crocheron was age 2 at the time of the voyage, but she recorded the stories her mother (Caroline Augusta Perkins Joyce Jackson) told in detail. Her mother's journal disappeared after her death, and Augusta's accounts of the voyage are among the most detailed that remain.)

=== A death per week ===
It took days to clean up the interior wreckage, sanitize quarters, and air out soggy bedding. Within another week, the Brooklyn had fair weather once more. Two weeks later, northeast trade winds took the ship close to the Cape Verde Islands. Soon thereafter, riding before southeast trade winds, the ship slanted down towards South America. Although Brooklyn had survived the great storm, the voyage claimed a dozen lives. Great sadness was reported as ten passengers died in the first three months at sea, nearly one a week. Each was buried at sea in the traditional mariners' manner, slipped over the side in a weighted canvas bag following religious remarks. Some burials were conducted privately to reduce the emotional strain. Half of the deaths resulted from diseases contracted before boarding the ship. Half of those who died were infants or young children. Twice the Brooklyn was trapped in doldrums. Sailing south near the equator, the ship spent two or three days stuck in oppressive heat.

Deaths before journey's end
Name	Age	Death Date	Location	Cause of Death
Joseph Nichols	2 yrs	Feb 14	37°N 50°W	Dehydration, nausea, diarrhea
Elias Ensign	57 yrs	Feb 20	19° 30'N 26°W	Tuberculosis
George Edward Robbins	5 yrs	Feb 28	3°N 25°W	Black smallpox
Charles D. Fowler	1 yr	Mar 6	2°50'S 27 °W	Dehydration, nausea and diarrhea
Eliza Ensign	20 yrs	Mar 7	3°S 27°W	Tuberculosis
John Franklin Robbins	1 yr	Mar 14	15°30'S 32°W	Black smallpox
Charles Elias Washington Burr	1yr	Mar 17	20°S 24°W	Dehydration, diarrhea
John Edward Miles (crew)	28 yr	Mar 26	35°30'S 43°W	Pains in his stomach, possibly burst appendix
Sarah Winner	6 mo	Mar 27	36°S 43°W	Cankered sore throat
Silas Aldrich	43 yrs 8 mo 20 d	Apr 1	43°S 47° W	Dropsy of the stomach, kidney failure, heart trouble
Laura Goodwin and unborn child	33 yrs	May 6	Juan Fernandez	Miscarriage and infection caused by fall from galley stairs
Orrin Hopkins Smith	10 mo	Jul 15	Oahu	Malnutrition
Amy Ann Smith	0 mo	after Jul 15	Oahu	Premature birth
Note: Those in italics did not appear in the ship's log. Cause of death as listed comes from other sources.

At some point early in the voyage, Brannan proposed the formation of "Samuel Brannan and Company" which would hold all the assets transported by the Brooklyn, including personal property. Other assets included $16,000 worth of supplies, such as tools and tents, that were purchased with church funds by William Appleby. The participants would act jointly to make preparations for members of the overland emigration; would pay the final transportation debt; and would give the proceeds of their labor for the next three years to a common fund, from which all would draw their living. Any who refused to obey the covenants set down would be expelled. If all dropped out, the common fund would go to Brannan as First Elder. Contention later arose over this plan. Although seen as unfair, the passengers signed the articles of agreement.

Weeks turned into months. Although passengers had assigned daily duties to occupy them, boredom hung heavily. The children attended school daily around the long table on the 'tween deck. The entire ship's company and crew celebrated the "crossing of the line" (the Equator) in March. It was common for passengers to compete at guessing the speed and nautical miles covered each day. Reading, board games, and child care filled many hours. When reading was not enough, one passenger resorted to lowering himself over the side of the ship on a rope to tease sharks. Daniel Stark brought surveyor's instruments and manuals, purchased before sailing. He studied mathematical principles throughout the voyage so that he could work as a surveyor when they landed.

=== Atlantic birth ===
Approaching Drake's Passage at the southern tip of South America, a healthy baby boy was born to Charles and Sarah Burr with the help of midwives. The baby was named John Atlantic Burr.

=== Cape Horn ===
Cape Horn was a major milestone on the route, and a daunting prospect. The region is beset by dangerous winds and often towering waves that beat against rocky cliffs on uncharted shores. It was not uncommon for the passage from east to west to take a full month before a sailing ship broke through powerful head winds coming from the west. To everyone's astonishment and relief, the Brooklyn "rounded" the Horn in a brief interlude between storms. It was cold and dim with no sight of the sun, but the wind and waves were otherwise good.

== Pacific passage ==
Brooklyn passed land's end "first rate," but could get no farther. Because of the dangers of a lee shore with high winds, it was standard practice for sailing vessels to give the western coastline of South America a wide berth. Two hundred miles of "westing" was required before turning north. Captain Richardson pressed forward against the strong winds from the Pacific, repeatedly losing way. Not able to proceed west or turn north, he decided to turn south in hopes of catching a different wind pattern. The farther south the ship sailed toward Antarctica, the colder it became.

Richardson's search for a countervailing wind finally paid off. Brooklyn was able to sail far enough west into the Pacific so that the ship could safely turn north. (Note: The Journal of Commerce printed a letter whose authorship is not known, but stylistically it was typical of Brannan's migration-promoting work. Edward Kemble, George Sirrine and James Skinner described the same portion of the journey having "intensely cold weather." The letter, titled "Island of Juan Fernandez, May 8th, 1846," quoted in Will Bagley's Scoundrel's Tale, reported that, "We had no freezing weather, and at no time was the thermometer in our cabin below 50°. On the deck, at one time, it fell for about three hours as low as 36°, which was accounted for by Capt. R. by our passing near an iceberg. We ran up to the Cape with a fair wind, then took a West wind and ran up to 60° South latitude in four days, then took a South wind till we had made our longitude West of the Cape, and then took a fair wind down the Pacific, which lasted till a few days ago.") By the time the ship "doubled" Cape Horn (sailed the 1,200 miles from 50° South on the Atlantic side, down to 60° South at the southernmost tip of the continent, and north again on the Pacific side to reach 50° South), passengers were "making bread, pies, cakes, frying doughnuts on deck once more and children were romping about the deck."

Brooklyn had been at sea for months without touching land. Crocheron reported that "the drinking water grew thick and ropey with slime, so that it had to be strained between the teeth, and the taste was dreadful." Water was rationed to one pint per day per person. "Rats abounded in the vessel; cockroaches and smaller vermin infested the provisions until eternal vigilance was the price imposed upon every mouthful." Ahead, fresh food and water could be acquired at Valparaiso, Chile, a third of the way up the South American continent. Brooklyn sailed with all speed toward their first landfall since New York. As Brooklyn neared the Valparaiso harbor, a second severe gale struck, although not as fierce as the first. The storm brought strong winds from the northeast and thick rain, which was collected in sailcloth and funneled into barrels. The winds beat against the ship with great force, dropping the vessel into the troughs between waves. Captain Richardson turned the ship to run before the wind and lowered the sails to keep them from shredding. One sailor was washed overboard, but hung on to a floating board until the crew rescued him. Driven back over 850 miles to 62.5° S, the Brooklyn was in grave danger from the growing, uneven weight of ice on the rigging and other exposed surfaces. George Sirrine's son, in his biography of his father, wrote that Captain Richardson called on the passengers to help save the ship. In freezing conditions, no one could remain topside for long. Men took turns breaking off icicle daggers and thick layers of ice from the ship, tossing them overboard, before the cold drove them inside. (Note: According to his son Warren Leroy Sirrine, George Sirrine said that when they were driven south at the mercy of the wind in the great storm, "he could see the ice burghs as large as the Superstition Mountains. Captain Richardson called [the Saints] together and told them the condition they were in and that probably there was only about one vessel out of 1000 (thousand) that ever lived to get out of there. But that if every man would volunteer his services probably they could save the vessel, as the passengers had all paid their fare he could not compel them to work. At that all the sailors fell on their knees and began to pray. But the Captain told them there was no time for prayers it was work or drown. Brannan, Sirrine and several of the saints stepped up to the Captain and said Captain we have done our praying, what shall we do. He said take those crow bars, hand spikes, cord wood, or anything they could strike the ropes with and go right around the vessel and for other men to take shovels and through the ice overboard. It was so cold that you had to breathe through your nostrils. About five minutes was as long as any of them could work then their nostrils would close up. Then you have to go down in the cabin and get thawed out. G.W.S. was a very strong man and no matter how hard he worked it seemed as though the cold would go right through him. After about one and a half hours and they had thrown one hundred tons of ice, Captain Richardson called them all together and said Boys you have saved the vessel and the wind beginning to change and the sailors can take the sails and put them up. And it wont be but a short time until we will be out of all danger.") His daughter Della similarly wrote that the passengers worked desperately for days to keep the ice off the ropes and decks.

=== The Juan Fernandez Islands ===
When at last Brooklyn broke free, Captain Richardson changed destination from Valparaiso and instead headed for the Juan Fernández Islands, about 400 miles to its west. During the storm, a pregnant mother, Laura Goodwin, had fallen on the steep galley stairs, miscarried and died a few days later, leaving behind a grieving husband and six children. She begged to be buried on land, rather than at sea. On May 4 when the ship landed at Más a Tierra in the Juan Fernández Islands group, her last request was honored.

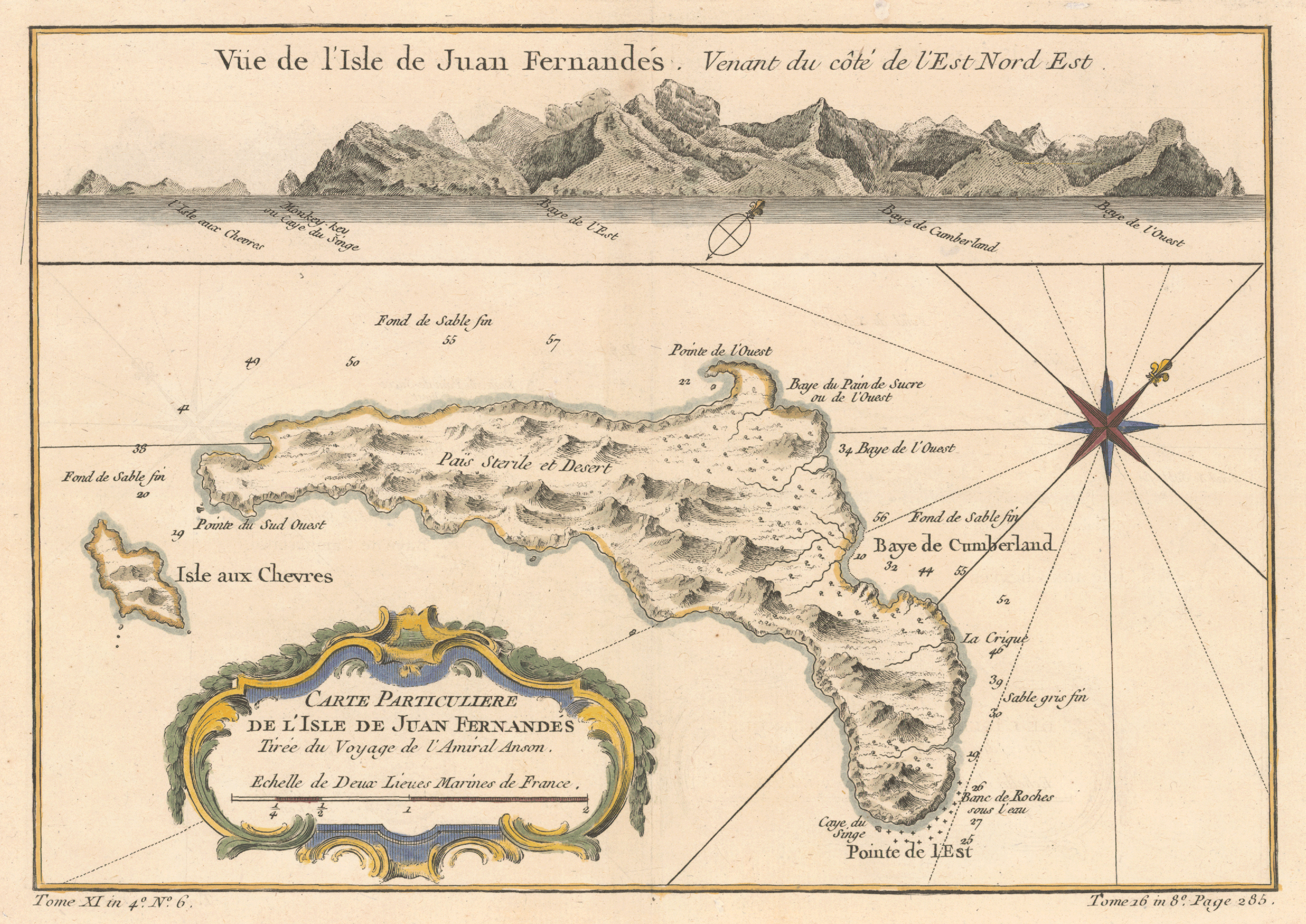
Isla Más a Tierra (1753)

Más a Tierra was made famous by Robinson Crusoe, Daniel Defoe's 1719 popular, fact-based fiction about a marooned sailor. Covered with grape vines, cabbages, and dense tree-fern forests, the known watering stop for passing ships was still sparsely inhabited. Chile used its isolation as a prison until earthquakes made it too unsafe and evacuated the inhabitants. On land for the first time since their departure, the passengers traded with the few residents for wood and water, rambled happily on dry land, and gathered fresh fruit and vegetables. Funds were saved that would have been spent on supplies in Valparaiso. The passengers feasted on crawdads from the river while fish and eels were caught and salted for the remainder of the journey. Casks of clean water from a stream were floated out to the ship, refreshing the depleted water compartments with 18,000 gallons. The standard rate would have been $1 for every 30 gallons delivered by water boats at Valparaiso.

Overall health was much improved during the week spent on the island. Sailing was delayed by a lengthy search for a boy who was missing when it was time to depart. Setting sail again on May 8, Brooklyn diverted from a direct route to California in order to deliver paying cargo to the Sandwich Islands (Hawaii).

Sailing northwest across the Pacific was mentioned as a real pleasure for the passengers until Brooklyn was becalmed once again—this time for three weeks near the equator. According to passenger James Skinner, even with an awning rigged, the air felt like a furnace. The passengers suffered greatly and "lay panting like lizards." The pitch melted out of the ship's seams until a breeze carried them to relief at last.

=== Pacific births ===
A week before reaching the Sandwich Islands, Phoebe Robbins delivered a baby girl, who was given the name Georgianna Pacific Robbins. The birth contrasted with the earlier loss of two of the Robbins boys, despite treatment by their father, who was a doctor.

Widower Orrin Smith had five small children and widow Amy Ann Dodd Hopkins had two. They married, creating a large, blended family in 1843. Their first child together was born in early August 1845. To their surprise, Amy became pregnant again shortly before the Brooklyn left New York. Seasickness and pregnancy took their toll on Amy's health. Their infant son, Orrin, suffered from malnutrition. They decided to pause their journey when the ship got to Honolulu to restore health.

On June 25, 1846, 136 days out of New York, the Brooklyn dropped anchor in the Sandwich Islands at Honolulu Bay. Baby Orrin died July 15 and Amy went into labor prematurely. The second baby, also named Amy Ann Smith, died a week later. When the mother regained her strength, the family caught another ship, joining the rest of the Brooklyn passengers at Yerba Buena in October.

=== Sandwich Islands ===
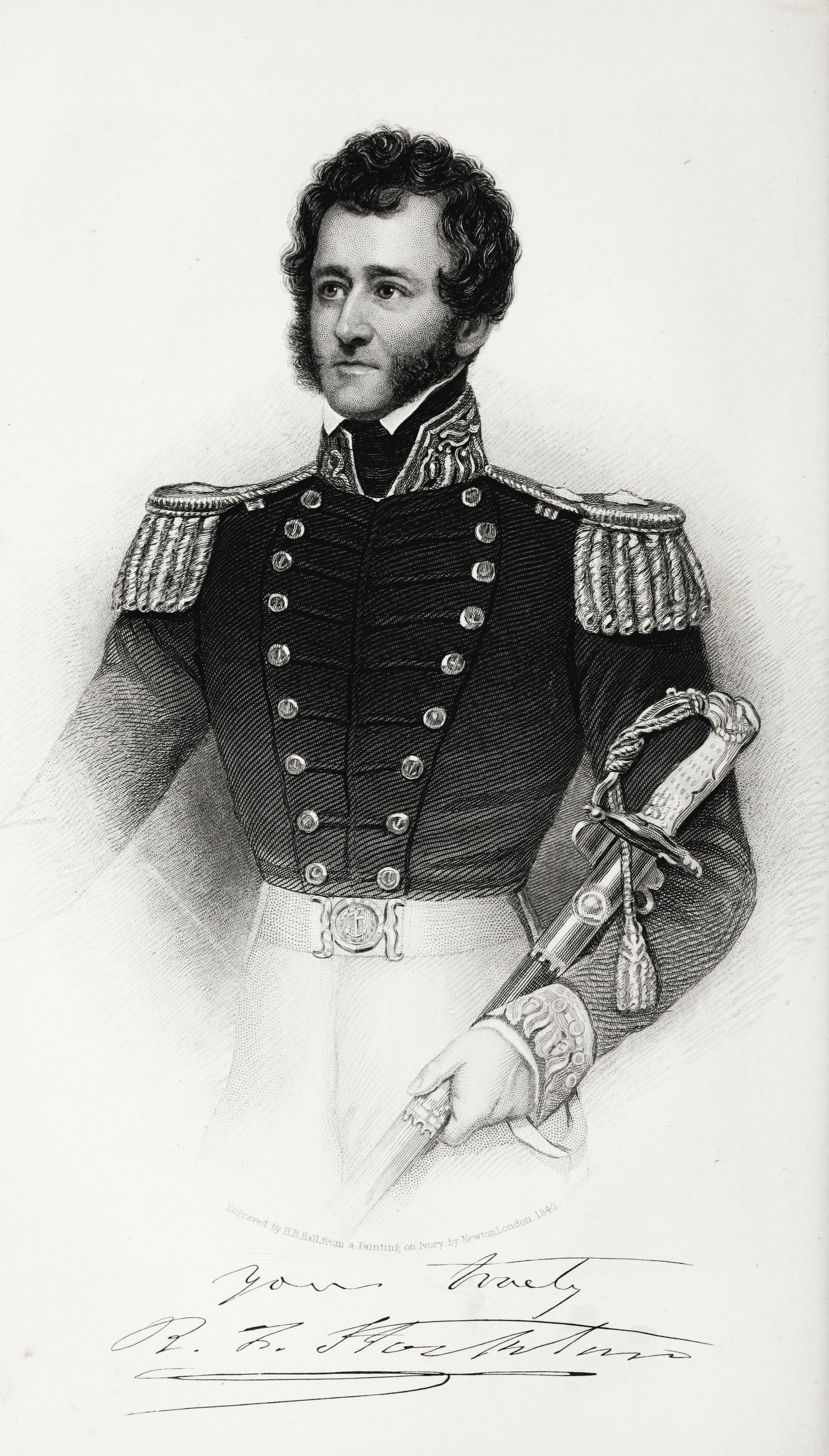
Commodore Robert F. Stockton

Commodore Robert Stockton of the USS Congress, anchored off Honolulu with the U.S. Pacific Fleet, visited the Brooklyn when it arrived, informing the passengers that the United States and Mexico were at war. When the Brooklyn sailed from New York, tensions with Mexico over Texas were increasingly apparent. John Slidell's 1845 mission to purchase California from Mexico for $30 million had failed. Those tensions turned into armed conflict while Brooklyn was at sea. After interviewing Brannan and others about their attitudes toward the United States, he recommended that the pioneers purchase arms for themselves. He requested that the Brooklyn transport weapons to San Francisco for the military and stand ready to assist their nation in any forthcoming action. Brannan's apprentice, Edward C. Kemble, who was not a member of the Church of Jesus Christ of Latter-day Saints, described the Brooklyn passengers being taken aback by the options that faced them. Despite this distressing, complicating news, after much discussion, the passengers decided to go on as planned, rather than turning back or diverting to Oregon.

While the Brooklyn was delivering its 800 pounds of freight, they secretly picked up at least three brass cannon mounted as light artillery, powder, shot, and a large supply of ammunition that had been shipped there by A. G. Benson the previous fall. The weapons were pressed into military service and used by Commodore Stockton.

At Honolulu, the passengers left the ship to explore and to purchase fresh fruit. Brannan noticed that George Sirrine was not buying anything, as all the others were, and asked him why. Sirrine replied that prior to departure from New York Brannan had called for anyone with money to spare to donate to help others afford the cost of the voyage. George gave Brannan every dollar he had, not withholding any. Brannan promptly returned $50 so he could buy fruit.

=== Kittleman twins ===
A potential international incident was averted when, "during the ship Brooklyn layover in Honolulu, several natives came aboard and when they saw the 9-month old Kittleman twin girls, Sally and Hannah, they were delighted and immediately wanted permission to take them ashore and show them to their Queen. The request was granted, but after they had been gone more than two hours, the mother Eliza became alarmed. The ship's crew organized a posse and were ready to start the search when two young native girls came running toward the ship with the infants. They brought numerous gifts from the Queen for their mother."

Bidding the Smith family a temporary farewell, on June 30, 1846, (Note: Hansen notes that Edward Kemble recalled the date as July 2.) the Brooklyn began the final leg of the journey. It took a month to reach the California shores. About a hundred miles out, they experienced a three-day calm, then a strong trade wind carried them speedily to the coast. Brooklyn remained at the Farallon Islands until morning, proceeding through the Golden Gate with some trepidation.

== Arrival at San Francisco Bay ==
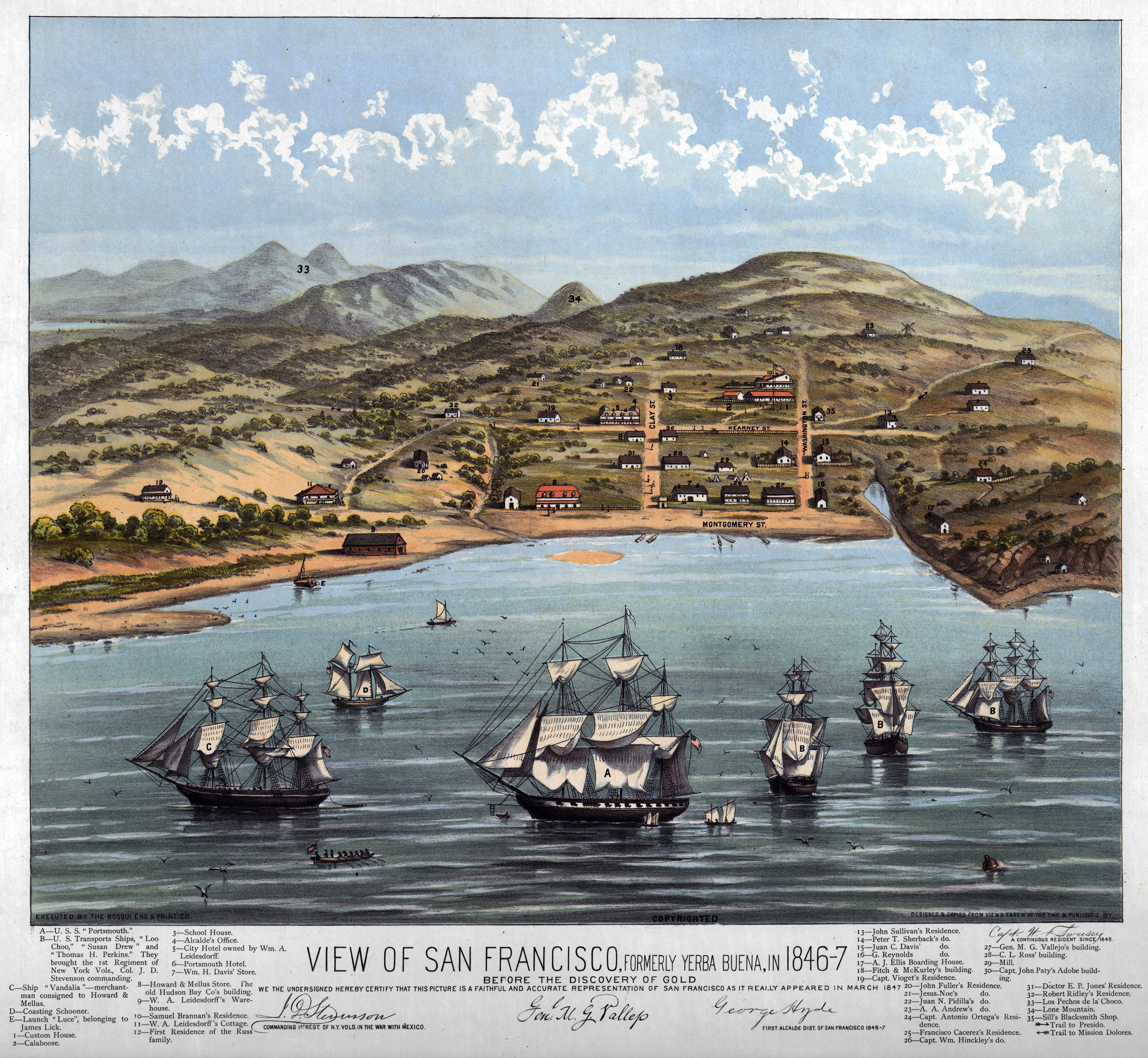
Yerba Buena at the time of the American conquest of California, based on the testimony of Captain William F. Sawsey

On July 31, 1846, after a voyage of five months, twenty-seven days, the Brooklyn sailed cautiously into the San Francisco Bay. When the fog lifted, Captain Richardson negotiated the unfamiliar sandbars and currents at the mouth of the bay without a pilot. The passengers were sent below as a precaution while the ship passed under the guns of Castillo de San Joaquin, the Mexican fort guarding the mouth of the bay.

=== Mexican Alta California now an American possession ===
Those on board the Brooklyn did not know that on July 1, 1846, Captain John Charles Frémont and his company, including Kit Carson and twenty Delaware natives, already spiked the three ancient brass and seven iron cannon at the presidio. (Note: Article includes an image of a claim supported by John C. Frémont August 5, 1853, for services by Captain Phelps in use of his vessel for Frémont's mission to spike the guns at the Castillo de San Joaquin. Details of the mission are given in the request.) Mexican forces buried two functional cannons before leaving the area. The American Navy quickly determined that the placement of the remaining Mexican guns would not cover the entrance to the bay. They built a new battlement and mounted fourteen American cannons to defend the area, presenting a more frightening defense than the Brooklyn would have seen a few weeks earlier.

The Brooklyn passengers found the USS Portsmouth at anchor and the American flag flying above the Customs House when they cautiously approached Yerba Buena Cove. Startled by sighting the incoming vessel, sailors on the Portsmouth beat to quarters, but stood down when they spotted women and children on deck. Brooklyn dropped anchor near the Portsmouth, becoming the first immigrant ship to arrive in the San Francisco Bay, under newly proclaimed American rule. Brooklyn's passengers more than doubled the population of the sparsely inhabited San Francisco peninsula.

Yerba Buena Cove was very shallow for some distance, preventing the ship from coming close to shore, and there was no wharf. Captain Richardson requested assistance from Captain John B. Montgomery of the Portsmouth in disembarking the Brooklyn passengers and their cargo. The hold was filled with tents, a two-year supply of clothing, mercantile items, "ploughs, hoes, forks, shovels, spades, plough irons, scythes, sickles, nails, glass, blacksmith's tools, carpenter's tools, millwright's tools, three mills for grinding grain, turning lathes, saw mill irons, grinding stones, one printing press and type, paper, stationery, school books, consisting of spelling books, sequels, history, arithmetic, astronomy, grammar, Morse's Atlas and Geography, Hebrew Grammar and Lexicon, slates, etc. etc. Also dry goods, twine, etc., brass, copper, iron, tin and crockery ware." John Van Cott, John Neff, Levi E. Riter, and other Easterners who were traveling overland sent heavy furniture and other bulky cargo via the Brooklyn, intending to collect it when they reached the west. Joseph Downey, a seaman on the Portsmouth, wrote, "It seemed as if, like the ship of Noah, it contained a representative for every mortal thing the mind of man had ever conceived."

=== Yerba Buena ===
At that time, the San Francisco Bay was a distant outpost of little interest to Mexico. The Latter-day Saints hoped to settle there quietly, far from other population centers, politics, and conflict. The mission and presidio had been shuttered a decade earlier. Few non-indigenous persons remained after the 1834 closure of California's mission system and supporting presidios. By 1844, there were about a dozen houses and fifty individuals around Yerba Buena. Earlier in 1846, the Hudson's Bay Company disposed of its trading post there. Few permanent residents, supplies, or buildings remained to accommodate the new immigrants. However, Boston merchant ships and forty to fifty whalers routinely stopped at the bay, according to captain and long time trader William Heath Davis.

=== Mexican–American War ===
American naval forces and marines took control of Monterey and San Francisco shortly before Brooklyn reached California. The Brooklyn passengers were also caught up in the Mexican–American War. They were forced to delay construction of dwellings or businesses for the new settlement. The ship sailed into the San Francisco Bay just three weeks after the Bear Flag Revolt. The presence of the newly arrived American settlers held the San Francisco Bay area for the United States, freeing Frémont's newly formed California Battalion to engage with Mexican forces to the south. A few of the Brooklyn men joined in Frémont's battles. Until the fighting moved south, the 70 male Brooklyn passengers were pressed into service by the Portsmouth's commander, practicing military drills during the day and standing guard at night.

A contingent of the Brooklyn passengers was sent to cut redwood as the final $1,000 payment to Captain Richardson for their passage. The wood could fetch a good price in China, Brooklyn's next destination. The first few months were very difficult for the families, as food was very scarce. Wind swept tents on sand hills and shared quarters in an old mission building were the pioneers' first homes until more substantial dwellings could be built. Some women found work doing laundry for ship crews and cooking in exchange for stale, moldy food from whaling ships. Finally, the men rejoined their families to build dwellings, establish livelihoods, and prepare for the arrival of the main body of Latter-day Saints. As the war moved farther south, Brooklyn passengers were able to work as carpenters, merchants, hotel keepers, teachers, freighters, and farmers. The farm tools, mechanics equipment, grain mills, printing press, and heavy supplies they brought were put to use.

=== San Francisco becomes "largely a Mormon town" ===
Despite the early hardships and food shortages, in short order Brooklyn settlers helped to transform the village of Yerba Buena into a thriving city on the bay. Historian Hubert H. Bancroft wrote, "San Francisco became for a time very largely a Mormon town. All bear witness to the orderly and moral conduct of the saints, both on land and sea. They were honest and industrious citizens, even if clannish and peculiar." Within their first year, more than 100 permanent structures were built. Brooklyn settlers helped modify the shoreline (now the Embarcadero) to accommodate deep-draft shipping. Some held seats on the city council, established San Francisco's first bank, library, English-speaking school and a newspaper, The California Star.

== New Hope ==
To feed the expected incoming overland migration, crops needed to be planted as soon as possible. Brannan consulted a number of longtime residents of the San Francisco Bay area about a good location to establish an agricultural colony. At John Marsh's home, he met Ezekiel Merritt, a well-known mountain man who had trapped in the area for many years. Merritt recommended flat, well watered land suitable for farming at the confluence of the Stanislaus and San Joaquin Rivers, and drew them a map. "Pathfinder" John C. Frémont had described that same area in positive terms. Using the joint funds of the Brooklyn passengers, Brannan purchased eighty acres that would be called New Hope.

=== Ship Comet ===
First landing place of sailing launch Comet
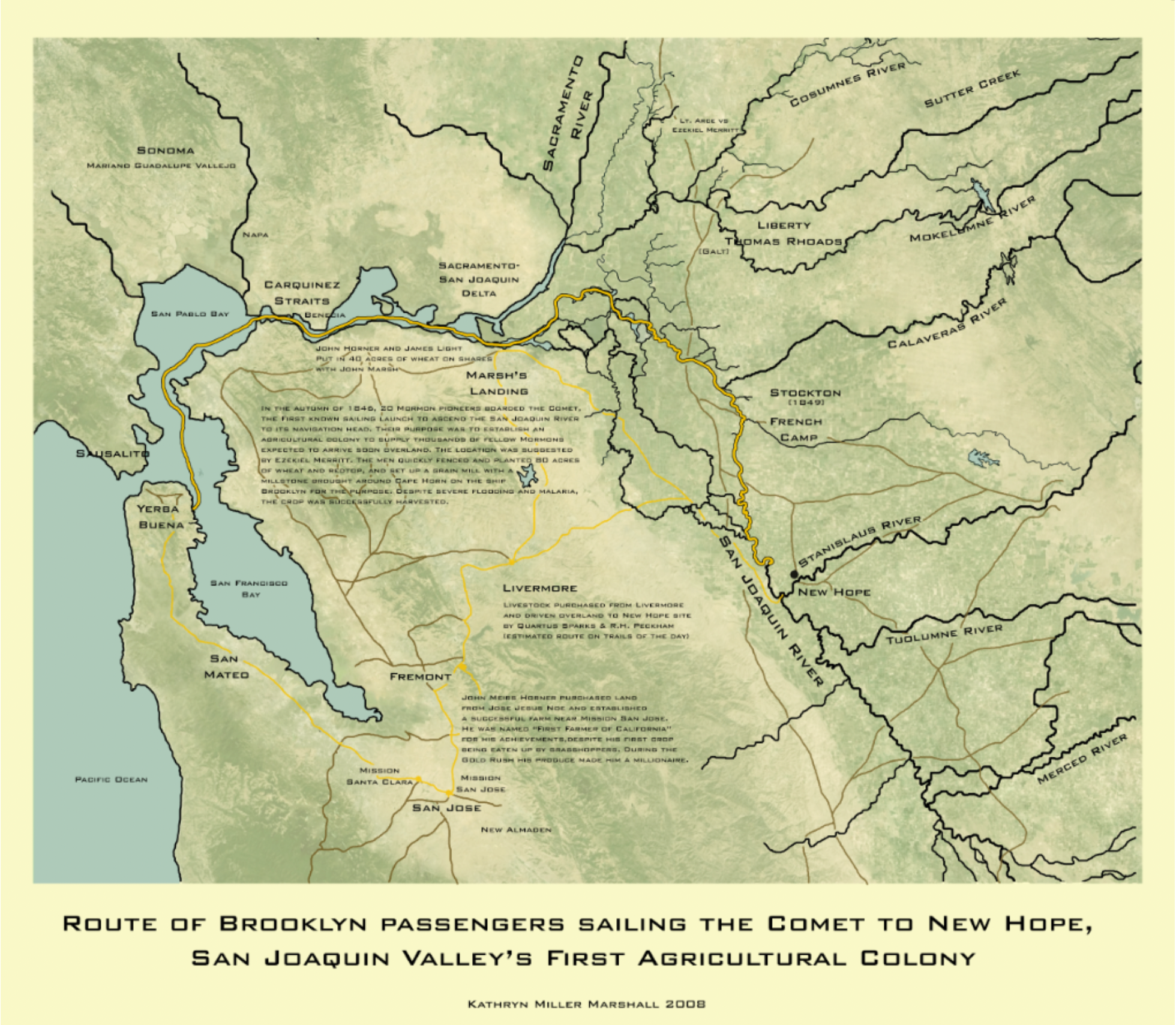
- Route of Brooklyn passengers sailing the Comet to New Hope, the San Joaquin Valley's first agricultural colony

California Historical Landmark
- Designated: June 2, 1949
- Reference no.: 437

At the advice of Marsh, Brannan also acquired a longboat to transport agricultural tools, seeds, supplies, and a mill stone to the location. (Note: Various sources describe the original boat as a ship's boat—possibly the Brooklyn's—or a disused whaleboat.) This was converted to a sail launch and named the Comet.

In the autumn of 1846, a few months after the Brooklyn pioneers had established themselves in Yerba Buena, 20 colonists boarded the Comet. It was the first known sailing launch to ascend the San Joaquin River to its navigation head. The route was circuitous, as it was difficult to find the proper channel through the twisting river branches across the Delta. At the point where thick tule reeds prevented further travel upriver, the men disembarked and carried their supplies the last six miles overland.

=== Establishing the site ===
Meanwhile, Quartus Sparks was sent to buy oxen from longtime resident Robert Livermore and to drive the livestock overland to the New Hope site. He was joined by Robert H. Peckham, a young deserter from a whaleship who later became a well-known judge in Northern California. Sparks had befriended Peckham early on, and invited him to join the New Hope endeavor where no one would discover him. The exact overland route is not known, but the map displays in yellow the known trails of the day that Sparks and Peckham likely used.

The pioneers quickly fenced and planted 80 acres with wheat and redtop grass, a forage crop for livestock. They built three dwellings, dug irrigation ditches, and brought water from the nearby river with a pole-and-bucket apparatus. The settlers set up a grain mill with one of the millstones that they brought around Cape Horn on the Brooklyn. After the initial constructions, there was tension between the designated leader William Stout and the other men. Some of the men came and went, bringing back additional workers when it was time to harvest the crop.

The area was lovely, well watered, abundant with game, and its soil was as rich as Ezekiel Merritt described. However, there were unexpected challenges. There was severe annual flooding of the rivers in that vicinity, creating swamp-like conditions nearby. In 1834, a French fur trapper had accidentally introduced malaria to the mosquito infested area. A number of the Brooklyn settlers contracted the life-threatening disease. One died. Despite the flooding and malaria, the crop was successfully harvested.

=== Colonists ===
- Jason Aldrich
- Alondus Buckland

Later joined by Nancy Laura Aldrich Buckland, his new wife; Prudence Aldrich, her mother; Jason Aldrich, her brother.

- Charles Burr and family

Likely Nathan and Amasa. Chloe and Sarah were in San Francisco for the birth of Nathan Miner Burr.

- William Evans
- Isaac Goodwin
- Ashbel Green Haskell
- John Horner
- Cyrus Irey
- Richard Knowles
- Samuel Ladd
- Isaac Leigh

Named foreman after his cousin William Stout was expelled

- Origin Mowry
- Eugene Rhanaldo Mowry

18 years old, probably there

- Robert F. Peckham

A deserter from the whaleship Cabinet, later a well-known judge in California; not a Latter-day Saint.

- Henry Rollins
- Isaac Thomas Rollins
- Quartus Sparks
- Daniel Stark

Agent for the eventual sale of New Hope property

- William Stout

Assigned as leader. Later replaced by Isaac Leigh.

- Thomas Tompkins
- George Winner

== William Glover ==
Across the bay in San Francisco, William Glover was elected a member of the first Town Council and School Board, serving with such local luminaries as William Leidesdorff and E. P. Jones. More American settlers began to arrive. Glover had previously served as the branch president (ecclesiastical leader of a congregation) in Easton, Pennsylvania, and managed transportation of coal exports from a mine in Nova Scotia. His leadership skills were turned to the development of homes, businesses, and a school for San Francisco's children.

Nine months after landing, Samuel Brannan turned over leadership of church business to Glover, and set off across the Sierras in search of Brigham Young's pioneer company coming west. Brannan was anxious to contact Young, with whom he had had no contact for nearly a year.

Brooklyn settlers soon managed hotels, did tailoring, made adobe bricks, did carpentry and masonry, ran ferry services, and sold merchandise. John Horner commenced farming near Mission San Jose, where other passengers joined him on neighboring land. Those who farmed learned that California's growing seasons differed from those in the east. They overcame invading grasshoppers and wild cattle trampling their crops.

== Consultation with Brigham Young ==
In April 1847, Brannan set out to find Brigham Young on the trail coming west. He left San Francisco on April 4, stopping at New Hope. Only a dozen men remained on site at that time, but he got provisions and mules from them for his journey. It is possible that Isaac Goodwin joined him from there, although the identities of Brannan's companions are still uncertain. On April 26, Brannan left Sutter's Fort with Charles C. Smith with whom he later did business, probably Isaac Goodwin, and one other man. The men set out across the icy Sierras early in the season when snows measured 20 to 100 feet deep in places. Brannan was known for physical bravery.

On June 30, the men found Young and an advance company crossing the Green River in Wyoming. Brannan's arrival was a surprise and not very cordially received. Brannan's endorsement of the Kendall-Benson contract had to be explained. Still in quest of the final settlement location, Young and Brannan entered the Valley of the Great Salt Lake together. The overland pioneers had exhausted their resources and could go no farther. Brigham Young's Pioneer Company would be hard pressed to survive until crops got in and became productive.

Brannan had clearly been told that the church intended to settle in the Rockies, but he was invested in San Francisco as an alternative headquarters. There was some cause for misunderstanding in early messages, in part because "California" extended from Utah to the Pacific at that time. Brannan was frustrated that he was unable to convince Brigham Young to continue to the Pacific coast, rather than settling in the arid desert.

On July 9, Brannan left for California, guiding Captain James Brown of the Mormon Battalion with an escort of 15-20 mounted men. Brown carried messages from Brigham Young to battalion veterans in California, telling them to remain there until the next season. There would be food shortages in the Salt Lake area. Brown had power of attorney to collect the pay of the Mormon Battalion's Sick Detachment and have them officially discharged from their year's service. Brown and Brannan had a harsh parting of the ways before reaching their destination.

Also accompanying Brannan and the battalion men was John S. Fowler, who became Brannan's friend and partner. Fowler had put his wife, Jerusha, and four boys on the Brooklyn, then hurried to Nauvoo to travel with the First Ten of the Pioneer Company, escorting some of the Apostles west. He was anxious to reunite with his family as soon as possible. Nineteen months passed before the Fowlers were reunited. Fowler learned that two of his boys died on the voyage. When the Gold Rush started, Brannan partnered with Fowler to build the City Hotel in Sacramento, from which they derived a handsome annual income of about $30,000.

== Dissolving communal efforts ==
Returning to San Francisco on September 17, 1847, Brannan observed that growth "beyond all conception" had occurred during his six-month absence. He informed the Brooklyn pioneers that the main body of Latter-day Saints had reached the Great Salt Lake, but they were not coming to the Pacific coast as anticipated. The gathering place was to be in an area to be named Deseret).

More than a year's work had gone into fencing farms against wild cattle, building roads and bridges, constructing homes, and establishing businesses in the San Francisco Bay area—all with the expectation that at least 12,000 fellow Mormons would soon arrive as customers, land purchasers, users of services, and community members. Brannan advised breaking up their communal arrangements and selling what they could, each to go their own way. New Hope and all the jointly owned properties were to be sold off. The Brooklyn passengers would have to sell assets that had just been built, outfit wagons, buy livestock, and assemble supplies to start over in a wilderness that was described as having poor prospects. A year after landing, the Brooklyn pioneers constituted about 25% of the peninsula's population. With so many selling off assets at the same time, their returns would be poor. The journey would require Brooklyn pioneers to traverse another 800 miles inland, cross the Sierras, and survive the dreaded Forty Mile Desert. The Brooklyn passengers lacked the means to migrate once more.

=== The remnants of New Hope ===
After New Hope was sold off, the Tompkins family, Buckland family, and perhaps others remained to work the land. Tompkins bought property at a slightly higher elevation in the same area. Much of the native population had been wiped out by the malaria a decade earlier. Survivors had moved to higher elevations up the Stanislaus River. They were New Hope's closest neighbors until Knight's Ferry was established. The settlers reported hearing the cries of children held captive by the indigenous people, for whom enslavement of competing tribe members was a common practice.

=== Plans to relocate ===
Despite their hard work building up San Francisco, most of the Brooklyn settlers remained strongly motivated to join the rest of their co-religionists, whether on the Pacific coast or in the Rockies. Living with like-minded individuals was desirable. More importantly, members of the church intended to work communally to build a place of worship called a temple. According to their beliefs, sacred ordinances performed there could unite families across generations. The passengers needed a way to "outfit" another migration.

Families traveling separately
Family	By sea	Overland	Reunion
Bird	Elizabeth (newborn infant daughter of friend who had also just given birth)	Edmund (father). Elizabeth's mother, Mary Montgomery, died two days after childbirth. Edmund sent the baby with close friends and their newborn son on the Brooklyn, intending to go overland and reunite when settled in the west.	Elizabeth was adopted by Daniel and Ann Cook Stark, who brought her west on the Brooklyn. Her father, Edmund Bird, and the Starks did not locate one another for 14 years.
Mowry	Barton (father); Ruth Walkup (mother); Origin (son); Eugene Rhanaldo (son)	Harley W. Mowry (son)	Harley was a member of the Mormon Battalion. After discharge, he married Martha Jane Sharp, had two children, and lived in Salt Lake City for two years. He joined the Lyman & Rich wagon train to settle San Bernardino, and located the rest of the family in San Francisco about 1851.
Rollins	Henry (father); Isaac Thomas (son); Jane Elizabeth Rollins Tompkins (daughter); Thomas King Tompkins (son-in-law); Amanda Tompkins (Henry's granddaughter); Jane Elizabeth Tompkins (Henry's granddaughter)	Ann Weatherhogg (mother); Steuben (youngest son); The Rollins had eleven children. History of the other children unknown.	After mining in the Gold Rush, Henry joined the Tompkins family in San Bernardino for two years to earn enough to outfit a wagon to Salt Lake. He reunited with his wife and son in 1849. Isaac Thomas continued gold mining.
Fowler	Jerusha H. Ensign (mother); Thomas (son); George (son); John S. Fowler Jr. (son) Charles D. (son); Elias Ensign (Jerusha's father); Eliza Ensign (Jerusha's sister)	John Sherman (husband and father)	Father came to California with Samuel Brannan, who was returning from seeing Brigham Young. He reunited with surviving family members in September 1847 at Mission Dolores, San Francisco. Their son, Charles D. Fowler, Jerusha's father, and her sister died on the voyage.
Haskell	Ashbel Green (husband)	Ursula Billings Hastings (wife); Irene Ursula Haskell (daughter); Francis Martin Pomeroy (son-in-law, husband of Irene); Thales Hastings Haskell (son of Ashbel and Ursula)	Ashbel was successful in the gold mines. He died east of Tragedy Springs in Rock Valley on July 27, 1849, while on route to rejoining his family in the Salt Lake vicinity. He was a member of the Thomas Rhoades "Gold Train".
Warner	Caroline Matilda Wilcox (wife); Myron E. (son); Sarah H. Warner (daughter); Henry J. Warner (son)	John Ely (husband)	Caroline waited for years with no word from John. John traveled to Salt Lake and married Eunice Billings in 1849. Caroline married Theodore Thorp in San Francisco. Religious meetings were held in his home. They moved to San Bernardino in 1852.

== The Gold Rush and its consequences ==
Funding the second leg of the Brooklyn pioneers' migration was made possible by the discovery of gold in the California foothills. On January 24, 1848, three months after receiving word that Brigham Young and the overland immigrants were not coming, gold was discovered in the American River near Sutter's sawmill at Coloma. Some of the Mormon Battalion veterans (commonly referred to as "battalion boys") had been building a water powered sawmill there when James Marshall spotted gold in the tailrace under construction. Only "a loosely held secret," word passed among Mormons and others about what to look for. In early March, Battalion veterans Sidney Willis, Wilford Hudson, and Levi Fifield located an even richer find twelve miles down river at Mormon Island. Samuel Brannan got word through his trading post at Sutter's Fort. He informed the Brooklyn settlers in San Francisco, urging them to go at once to the mines. About 150 Mormons staked claims alongside the "battalion boys" on that high yield deposit. Long before the rest of "the world rushed in," Brooklyn pioneers and other Mormon settlers already in California carried out placer mining at Salmon Falls, Murderer's Bar, south along the Cosumnes River, and at other rich sites.

As a newspaper owner and shrewd businessman, Samuel Brannan publicized the richness of the finds to spur the Gold Rush that quickly transformed Northern California. Brannan's publicity stunt, shouting, "Gold! Gold! Gold from the American River!" nearly emptied San Francisco of its inhabitants. Businesses closed for want of customers or hired help. Initial reports of the ready availability of extensive mineral wealth were not believed, even by California's Military Governor Richard Barnes Mason, until he and his lieutenant, William Tecumseh Sherman, visited the mining districts in person. They observed hundreds of miners successfully working claims along the river banks. At Mormon Island, Brooklyn's William Glover selected nuggets and flake specimens for the famous "Gold Tea Caddy" sent to Washington, D.C., by Col. Mason. The tin was filled with 230 ounces of gold for the Adjutant General to convince President Polk of the reality and extent of the gold discoveries. After Polk's endorsement in his address to the nation, the gold tea caddy was put on display for the general public, sparking widespread "gold fever." San Francisco business owners urged Brannan to create a special edition of his newspaper, The California Star, to promote California's virtues and mineral wealth back east. Brannan prepared 2,000 copies, sending ten men, six of them Mormon Battalion veterans, across the Sierras, along with the first eastbound mail.

Long before the rest of the world learned of the gold strikes, before others could arrange passage to harvest the mineral, most of the Brooklyn settlers engaged in placer mining at Mormon Island and elsewhere in the foothills. Their general procedures for mining camp management and establishing claims were largely adopted by subsequent argonauts. Selling food and supplies to incoming "forty-niners" became the real gold mine. Brannan's lucrative trading posts and land speculation made him one of California's first millionaires. Approximately 250,000 hopeful miners arrived in the early days of the Gold Rush, all needing food in a sparsely populated land. The farm produce that John Horner had intended to support the Mormon migration quickly made him another one of California's early millionaires. Property values in San Francisco skyrocketed, bringing additional income to some of the Brooklyn pioneers. About half of the Brooklyn passengers obtained enough wealth from gold mining or trade with miners that they were soon able to relocate to the Great Basin.

In the summer of 1848 before the mass of "forty-niners" arrived, Brooklyn passengers loaded wagons with their gold and supplies and headed east over the Sierras. They banded together with Mormon Battalion veterans and others for safety from bandits and other hostiles. Through their military service, the battalion veterans had become experienced trail blazers and road builders. Desirous of reaching their families as soon as possible, the "battalion boys" scouted out a viable route over the Sierras that was passable earlier in the year and at a lower elevation than the commonly used Truckee River route over Donner Pass. The men cut their own trail going east, breaking boulders out of the way as they went. The route ran from Placerville through Hope Valley and down Devil's Staircase to the desert floor. Their Mormon Emigrant Trail (also known as the Carson Pass Emigrant Trail) became the primary route used by gold miners coming west into California. It was along this route that the Brooklyn pioneers journeyed to Utah in five wagon trains between 1848 and 1857.

Despite the wealth obtained, the Gold Rush had a detrimental effect on living standards. Brooklyn settlers had to cope with increasing lawlessness around them. San Francisco had an ever-growing population of mostly transient fortune seekers. Over 250,000 forty-niners arrived during the first Gold Rush season. 549 ships sailed into San Francisco Bay between April and December 1849, an average of 61 ships per month. Chaos and congestion were created as 45 ships arrived on a single day. Nearly all of them were immediately abandoned by their crews and sometimes by their captains, who left for the gold fields. The promising city was quickly overtaken by crime, gambling dens, and arsonists. Large portions of the city were intentionally burned to the ground five times by criminals. During the rainy season when mining had to pause, many argonauts who were unlucky at the diggings fell into illness or homeless despair, and committed suicide. Longtime residents complained that the city was no longer fit for families. Some Brooklyn passengers, including Samuel Brannan, got caught up in the wilder lifestyle and business pursuits. Brannan turned over church services and other religious matters to William Glover, John Horner, and Addison Pratt, who was merely passing through San Francisco on his way to Utah.

A big problem was created by self-styled "Regulators" who sought to keep non-Americans—particularly the early arriving Chileans and Peruvians—from participating in the Gold Rush. They and the criminal gangs referred to as Hounds "intimidated merchants by day and looted foreign encampments by night." In the transition from Mexican to military to civilian American justice systems, law enforcement was virtually nonexistent in San Francisco for a time. The alcalde and a minuscule constabulary were incapable of managing the extent of lawlessness in the city. In the summer of 1849, Samuel Brannan was serving on the Town Council. He and many others were outraged by "murderers and incendiaries" who committed violent attacks on women and foreigners, and who repeatedly caused large portions of the city to be destroyed. Brannan became the leader of a Vigilance Committee that asserted "the right of self-preservation." It empaneled large juries who took evidence and passed judgment on well-known troublemakers caught in criminal acts. Although lacking any legal authority, the Vigilance Committee summarily executed a few "rogues" to the satisfaction of the general populace, but to the consternation of legal authorities. Similar actions were taken in Stockton and Sacramento, resulting in a swift reduction of crime. Samuel Brannan was once again disfellowshipped by the church for his part in these events, and he was officially removed from any role in church leadership.

== The Mormon Battalion ==
The Brooklyn pioneers' history is interwoven with the story of veterans from the U.S. Army of the West's Mormon Battalion. They rebuilt San Francisco together after city-wide fires, attended church together, married one another, and migrated to the Salt Lake Valley together over a road built by the Mormon Battalion veterans. When President Polk sent General Stephen Watts Kearny with the Army of the West to take California, Kearny was ordered to enlist 500 Latter-day Saint refugees directly from their wagon trains in order to form the Mormon Battalion. They served as road and bridge builders to create a wagon road across the southwest. Unsure if the recruitment offer was intended as a test of allegiance to the United States or as a ploy to make the scattered Latter-day Saints more vulnerable to attack along the trail, many men were reluctant to leave their families in exposed wagons on the plains. Given assurances of a legitimate offer and various concessions, enough men enlisted to form the Mormon Battalion—the only U.S. military unit ever formed exclusively on the basis of religion. The Mormon Battalion served for one year and were discharged in southern California. Most quickly headed for the northern Sierra crossing through Donner Pass to rejoin their families, who were believed to be in Utah or at Winter Quarters.

Because of famine in Utah, Brigham Young sent word instructing discharged Mormon Battalion veterans to delay coming to the Salt Lake Valley. Samuel Brannan ran into the "battalion boys" on the trail as he returned from Utah. He delivered the message to overwinter in California and come in the spring with supplies. Many battalion veterans found short-term employment at Sutter's Fort, the sawmill at Coloma, and in San Francisco where they mingled with the Brooklyn settlers. They were present for the gold discovery and participated in placer mining at Mormon Island, digging alongside the Brooklyn settlers. Some married Brooklyn passengers. Having done road building, bridge building, and brick making for their military service, a number of the battalion veterans lingered to apply their skills in San Francisco. With each major fire, San Francisco quickly rebuilt using increasingly fire resistant materials. Battalion veteran Zacheus Cheney married Mary Ann Evans, a Brooklyn passenger, and later her sister, Amanda, also from the Brooklyn, when his first wife died in childbirth. Cheney and James Bailey built the first brick kiln in San Francisco, making 50,000 bricks to rebuild the city. In 1857 when Brigham Young asked Latter-day Saints to come stand with the church in Utah against the approach of Johnston's Army, Cheney led a small wagon train to Deseret over the Mormon Emigrant Trail. He was the last head of a Mormon congregation in the San Francisco Bay Area for many years until Brigham Young re-opened branches of the Church of Jesus Christ of Latter-day Saints in California. John Horner and other Mormons imported steel window shutters and doors to install against fire hazards. John Sirrine, William Stout and Moses Meder were partners in a lumber mill business in Santa Cruz, California, providing redwood boards to rebuild the city. It was more lucrative than gold mining, although they did well there also.

Relationships between ship Brooklyn passengers and Mormon Battalion veterans
Ship Brooklyn passenger	Mormon Battalion veteran
Elizabeth Wallace Bird, wife	Thomas A. Howell, husband; son of Thomas Charles Davis Howell
John Eagar, husband	Sariah Ann Johnson, wife; later wife of Andrew Jackson Workman
Mary Ann Fisher, first wife Amanda Miller Evans, Mary Ann's half- sister; Zacheus' second wife	Zacheus Cheney, husband
Emerette Elizabeth Goodwin, wife	William A. Coons, husband
John Read Clark Jamison (son of Hannah Tucker Read, grandson of Christianna Gregory Read)	Caroline Martin Garr, wife; widow of Nathaniel Vary Jones
Elizabeth Jane Kittleman, wife	Henry Simon Dolten (Dalton), husband
Barton Mowry (father), Ruth Walkup Mowry (mother), Origin Mowry and Rhanaldo Mowry (brothers)	Harley W. Mowry, son and brother
Mercy Murray Day Hooker Narrimore, wife	Elijah Thomas, husband
Lucy Nutting, wife	James Ferguson, husband
Elizabeth Margaret Frances Pool, wife Mary Cramer, Elizabeth's mother, wife of Thomas	Thomas Charles Davis Howell, husband
Christianna Rachel Reed, wife	Franklin Weaver, husband
Elizabeth Bradley Smith, wife	Henry Willard Brizzee, husband
Catherine Clark Smith, wife, widow of Robert Smith	Isaac Harrison, husband
Jane Elizabeth Tomkins, wife	Jesse Divined Hunter, husband
Mary Ann Winner, wife	David Ira Frederick Sr., husband

== Additional contributions to California history ==
=== Donner Party rescue ===
When word came about the desperate plight of the stranded Donner Party, Samuel Brannan quickly solicited substantial donations to fund the rescue operations. He sent wagons with supplies, and arranged for families to take in the survivors. Passenger Howard Oakley was one of the last rescuers, carrying out 11 year old Mary Donner on his back. Caroline Joyce and her family nursed and housed some of the survivors after their harrowing experience. Frank Ward, who was running a ferry service, offered use of his launch for the Donner rescue.

=== Caroline Augusta Perkins Joyce ===
As conditions deteriorated around the bay area, some Brooklyn passengers remained in the area, but many left San Francisco to found San Bernardino and other communities in the West. One was Caroline Augusta Perkins Joyce. With her superb voice, Caroline was famed as "The Mormon Nightingale." The Joyce family became extremely wealthy through the Gold Rush. In the Fall of 1850 when a cholera epidemic struck down a dozen people per day in San Francisco, Caroline went through the city collecting up children she found who had been orphaned by the plague. She provided for 50 of them personally at first, then established an orphanage, and worked to find permanent funding for it. Later, other Protestant ladies who moved into the city objected to having a Mormon associated with the orphanage. Caroline took up other charitable causes.

As San Francisco became wilder, Caroline's husband adopted different moral standards. The couple divorced over his changed behavior. Responding to the invitation of Apostles Charles C. Rich and Amasa Lyman to colonize San Bernardino, Caroline and her children moved south. She eventually married Alden Jackson, a hero of the Mexican–American War who was a judge. Jackson faced down a mob and preserved threatened court records. Caroline routinely sent root plants and cuttings to assist the people settling St. George, Utah. The family eventually moved to St. George, established orchards, and were early promoters of the silk industry there.

=== John Meirs Horner ===
John Horner was one of the most successful farmers of the Gold Rush. He did not want to be part of S. Brannan and Company, and went out on his own right away. He and James Light agreed to raise wheat on shares with John Marsh, an American who had land in the Suisun Bay area. A one time Indian agent with a medical background, Marsh developed a reputation for greed, conspiracy, and personal harshness. He cheated Horner and Light out of their share of the harvest. Horner commenced crop experiments near the old Mission San Jose. California's rain, growing seasons and harvest seasons were so different from those back East that many adamantly believed California could not support itself with its own produce. Horner proved them wrong. Soon he was building roads and bridges, a ferry service, and warehouses to handle his growing agri-business. The 1850 season alone yielded him $150,000. During the Gold Rush, Horner's farms saved miners from scurvy and made him one of California's first millionaires.

Horner's award-winning produce submitted at an 1851 exhibition changed public opinion, convincing people of the viability of California as an agricultural region. Of his early efforts Horner wrote, "Flour mills not being sufficient in California at this time, we built one at Union City ... at a cost of eighty-five thousand dollars, and ground our grain and that of others ... We equipped and ran a stage line in connection with our steamer, as far up the valley as San Jose, twenty-five miles. Thus completing a through passenger line from San Francisco to San Jose. We opened sixteen miles of public roads, mostly through our own land, and fenced part on both sides." In 1853, John Horner sent for 300 grafted fruit trees from back East. They were carried across the Isthmus of Panama by mule and shipped to his farms.

John and his brother William built the first bridges and laid out eight towns: Centerville, Washington, Frémont (originally Union City), New Haven, Irvington, West Union, and others. Already one of the most successful farmers of California, Horner turned his attention to improving wheat production. He imported a combine harvester from back east, made major improvements, began demonstrating its use, and revolutionized large-scale agribusiness in the state. His personal campaign to educate fellow farmers led California to become one of the world's leading wheat producers.

John Horner and other Latter-day Saints from the Brooklyn often assisted both incoming Mormon converts from around the world and missionaries going out into the world, paying for their passage and purchasing clothing for them. Horner co-signed several loans to assist friends and new arrivals to get started. When they were unable to pay during the 1854 financial crisis, as co-signer Horner suffered tremendous losses. Horner regrouped and moved to Hawaii, where he was the first to raise coffee beans on the islands. He wrote National Finance and Public Money. The economic principles he advocated were adopted by the Legislature of the Kingdom of Hawaii and by the government of Egypt. He was elected to the Kingdom of Hawaii House of Nobles, where he served for six years.

=== San Bernardino ===
In 1851, Amasa Lyman and Charles C. Rich, Apostles of the Church of Jesus Christ of Latter-day Saints, came from Salt Lake and recruited about half of the remaining Brooklyn pioneers to build a Latter-day Saint colony at San Bernardino, California. San Bernardino became the second largest city in California at the time. A southern route to Salt Lake City along the "Mormon Corridor" served incoming converts from overseas and was an economic powerhouse for some time.

Twenty-three Saints eventually returned to the Eastern states, and two settled in Hawaii.
