= Brooklyn, Wetzel County, West Virginia =

Unincorporated community in West Virginia, United States

Brooklyn
- Unincorporated community
- Location within the state of West Virginia Brooklyn (the United States)
- Coordinates: 39°38′7″N 80°51′48″W
- Country: United States
- State: West Virginia
- County: Wetzel
- Incorporated: May 22, 1889
- Annexed to New Martinsville: May 6, 1935
- Elevation: 630 ft (190 m)
- Time zone: UTC-5 (Eastern (EST))
  - Summer (DST): UTC-4 (EDT)
- GNIS ID: 1553984

Brooklyn is an unincorporated community in Wetzel County, West Virginia, United States.

== History ==
Brooklyn was incorporated as a town on May 22, 1889, by the circuit court. The town was annexed to New Martinsville on May 6, 1935.
