= Brooklyn (Waterbury) =

Brooklyn is a section/neighborhood of the city of Waterbury, Connecticut. Its name is derived from immigrants who moved up the road from Brooklyn in New York City. The area lies southwest of I-84 and west of Route 8, nestled between the sections of Town Plot and the South End. At its height, Brooklyn contained five grammar schools, three drug stores, three theaters, eight bakeries, two breweries, a library, a firehouse, a YMCA, and 22 taverns.

== History ==
History of the Brooklyn Neighborhood The Brooklyn section of Waterbury was so-named due to its similarity to New York City's Brooklyn; Viewing the City from Brooklyn proper, one must look over and beyond the City's most major river, the Naugatuck River.

·It is unknown if the naming of Brooklyn was initiated by any of the several Waterbury men who served in the Revolutionary War in 1777 at Brooklyn New York under Colonel Baldwin.

·The earliest known reference to Brooklyn is indicated in 1733.

== Demographics ==
The area contained a mix of immigrants looking for work in one of Waterbury's industrial, manufacturing and business powerhouses before the economic downturn. Irish, Polish, Russians, Lithuanians, Jews and Italians lived in the neighborhood, supporting a vibrant mix of grocers, bakeries, and shops catering to distinctive ethnic traditions. The Lithuanian community flourished, establishing St. Joseph's Church and school, which was the first Lithuanian church in New England in 1894, and organizing over 20 associations to serve Lithuanian interests in the area, including Lithuanian Girl Scouts, political clubs, choirs, bands, sports teams, saloons and a Lithuanian chapter of the Chamber of Commerce. In the Brooklyn neighborhood in Waterbury, CT, residents most commonly identify their ethnicity or ancestry as Puerto Rican (20.8%). There are also a number of people of Jamaican ancestry (14.5%), and residents who report Dominican roots (14.3%), and some of the residents are also of Italian ancestry (11.8%), along with some Irish ancestry residents (4.6%), among others.

== Brooklyn Baking Company ==
8 John Street, in the Brooklyn neighborhood for years was home to the Brooklyn Baking Company, an award winning and nationally renown Bread, Donut and pastry shop. The store continues to this day although no longer in the neighborhood. It is now the home of Lourdes Creole Restaurant.
