= Brooklyn, Pulaski County, Virginia =

Unincorporated community in Virginia, US

Coordinates: 37°09′04″N 80°33′37″W

Brooklyn is an unincorporated community in Pulaski County, in the U.S. state of Virginia.
