= Brookline =

Brookline may refer to:

== Places in the United States ==
- Brookline, Massachusetts, a town near Boston
- Brookline, Missouri, a village
- Brookline, New Hampshire, a town
- Brookline (Pittsburgh), a neighborhood in Pittsburgh, Pennsylvania
- Brookline, Vermont, a town
- Brookline, Pennsylvania, an unincorporated community in Haverford Township, Pennsylvania

== See also ==
- Brooklin, Maine
- Brooklyn
