= Brookland (Grassy Creek, North Carolina) =

Historic farm in North Carolina, United States

- U.S. National Register of Historic Places
- U.S. Historic district
- Location within North Carolina Location within the United States
- Location: NC 1443, near Grassy Creek, North Carolina
- Coordinates: 36°31′03″N 78°34′32″W
- Area: 23 acres (9.3 ha)
- Built: 1817
- Architectural style: Georgian, Federal
- MPS: Granville County MPS
- NRHP reference No.: 88000412
- Added to NRHP: April 28, 1988

Brookland is a historic tobacco plantation complex and national historic district located near Grassy Creek, Granville County, North Carolina. The plantation house was built about 1817, and is a two-story, four-bay, heavy timber frame Georgian / Federal style dwelling. It has a gable roof, hall-and-parlor plan, and cut stone exterior end chimneys. Also on the property are the contributing kitchen, smokehouse, schoolhouse, three log tobacco barns, log striphouse, log stable, hay barn, chicken house, and a frame smokehouse.

It was listed on the National Register of Historic Places in 1988.
