= Brooklyn Park =

Brooklyn Park may refer to:

- Brooklyn Park, Minnesota, United States
- Brooklyn Park, Maryland, United States
- Brooklyn Park (Portland, Oregon), United States
- Brooklyn Park, South Australia

== See also ==
- For parks in Brooklyn, New York City, see List of parks in New York City § Brooklyn
