= Brooklyn, Prince Edward Island =

Community in Prince Edward Island, Canada

Brooklyn may refer to one of two unincorporated settlements in Prince Edward Island, Canada:

- Brooklyn in Kings County at 46°06′00″N 62°40′00″W
- Brooklyn in Prince County at 46°48′00″N 64°07′00″W
