= San Joaquin Castle =

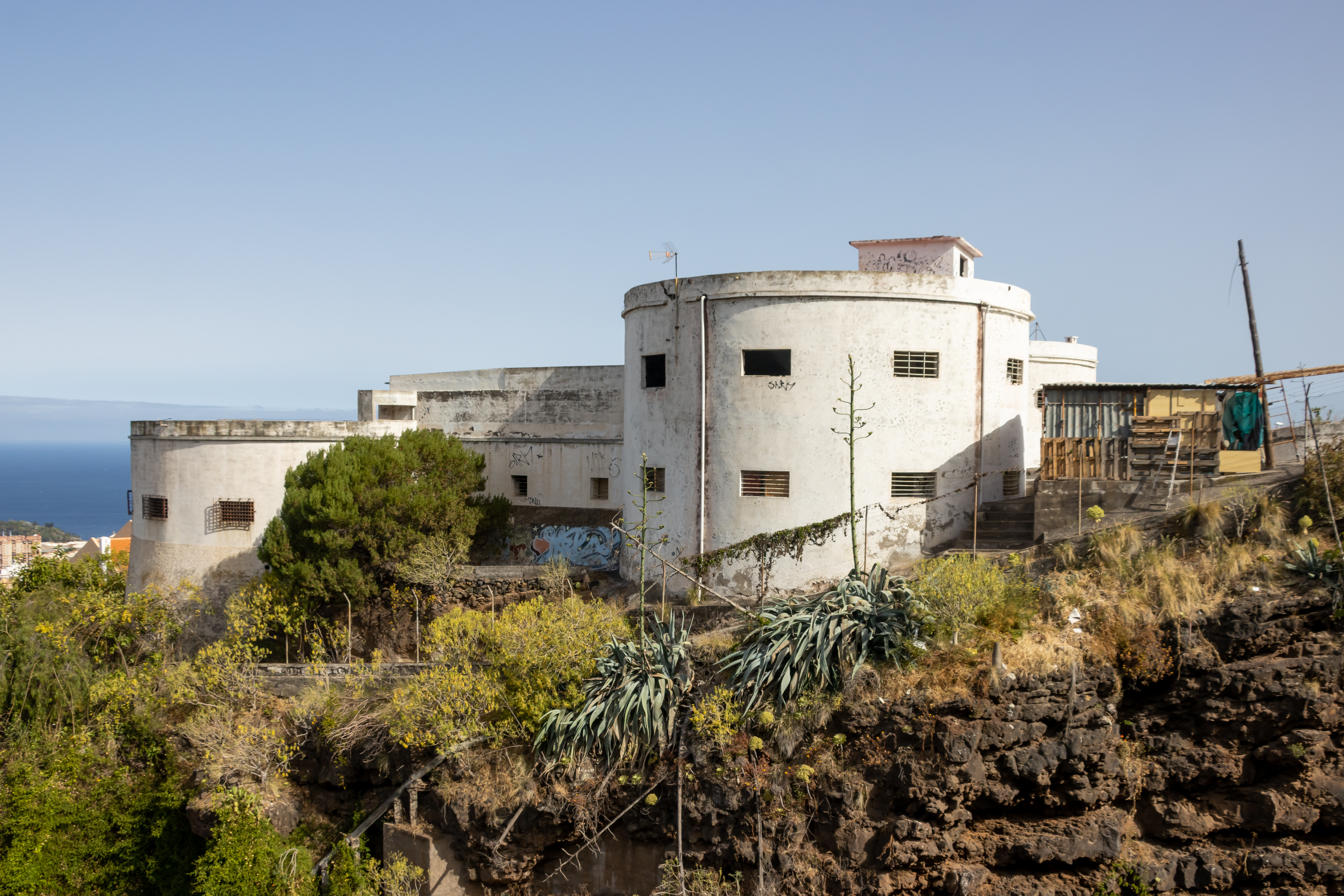
- The castle in 2021

- Location within Tenerife
- 28°27′57″N 16°16′54″W
- Type: fortification
- Location: La Cuesta, Tenerife

History
- Built: 1586
- Rebuilt: 1780

Spanish Cultural Heritage
- Designated: 2000

San Joaquin Castle (Spanish: Castillo de San Joaquín) is an inland fortification in La Cuesta, on the road that connects Santa Cruz de Tenerife and San Cristóbal de La Laguna, in Tenerife, Canary Islands, Spain.

In 1586, Governor D. Juan Núñez de la Fuente ordered the construction of several platforms at the site, designed by the Italian Leonardo Torriani, which were subsequently abandoned. The current building's construction started in 1780. It was constructed to defend the interior of the island, should the coastal defenses of the island fall.

The castle is square, with circular towers at each corner. It has a central courtyard, with bays on two sides. Two of the towers were used to store gunpowder.

While the outside of the structure has remained constant, the inside has been frequently modified to suit the various uses of the building, varying from a military prison to an ammunitions dump to a dovecote. It was home to the Cuerpo de Colombofilia Militar Español.

It was sold in 1996 to a private individual, and is currently abandoned.

It was recorded by the Spanish Ministry of National Education on 22 April 1949, and it was declared of cultural interest on 15 February 2000.
