= Brooklyn Township =

Brooklyn Township may refer to:

- Brooklyn Township, Lee County, Illinois
- Brooklyn Township, Schuyler County, Illinois
- Brooklyn Township, Susquehanna County, Pennsylvania
- Brooklyn Township, Williams County, North Dakota, in Williams County, North Dakota
- Brooklyn Township, Lincoln County, South Dakota
