= Brooklyn Avenue =

Brooklyn Avenue may refer to:

- List of Brooklyn avenues, 1-28
- List of Brooklyn avenues, A-Z
- Brooklyn Avenue (BMT Fulton Street Line), a former station in New York City
- Cesar Chavez Avenue, a street in Los Angeles formerly named Brooklyn Avenue
  - Brooklyn Heights, Los Angeles, California, named for Brooklyn Avenue
