= Treaty of 1752 =

British-Mi'kmaq treaty signed in Nova Scotia

- Canada
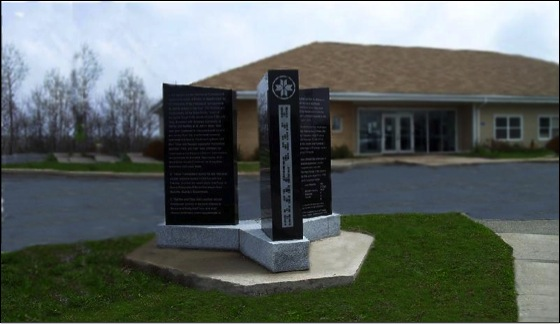
- Monument to the Treaty of 1752
- For the Treaty of 1752
- Location: near Shubenacadie First Nation, Nova Scotia Canada

The Treaty of 1752 was a treaty signed between the Mi'kmaq people of Shubenacadie, Nova Scotia and the governor of Nova Scotia on 22 November 1752 during Father Le Loutre's War. The treaty was created by Governor Peregrine Hopson and signed by Jean-Baptiste Cope.

== Legal invocation ==
In 1928, Mr. Gabriel Sylliboy was the first to invoke the Treaty of 1752 in the courts (R. v. Sylliboy). He was Mi’kmaq Grand Chief. He was charged in Inverness County, Cape Breton, with possession of muskrat and fox pelts, in violation of the provincial Lands and Forests Act. The judge claimed that the 1752 treaty only applied to a small band of Mi’kmaq at Shubenacadie, located in central Nova Scotia, and therefore did not apply to Syliboy who was from the Whycocomagh Reserve in Cape Breton.

In 1985, Mr. Simon from Shubenacadie invoked the Treaty of 1752 in the courts (R. v. Simon). The courts reported that the treaty protected hunting rights for those from Shubenacadie. The court also indicated that there was not enough evidence uncovered at that time to determine if the treaty was terminated by subsequent hostilities. The court did not countenance any aboriginal rights to hunt and fish commercially.

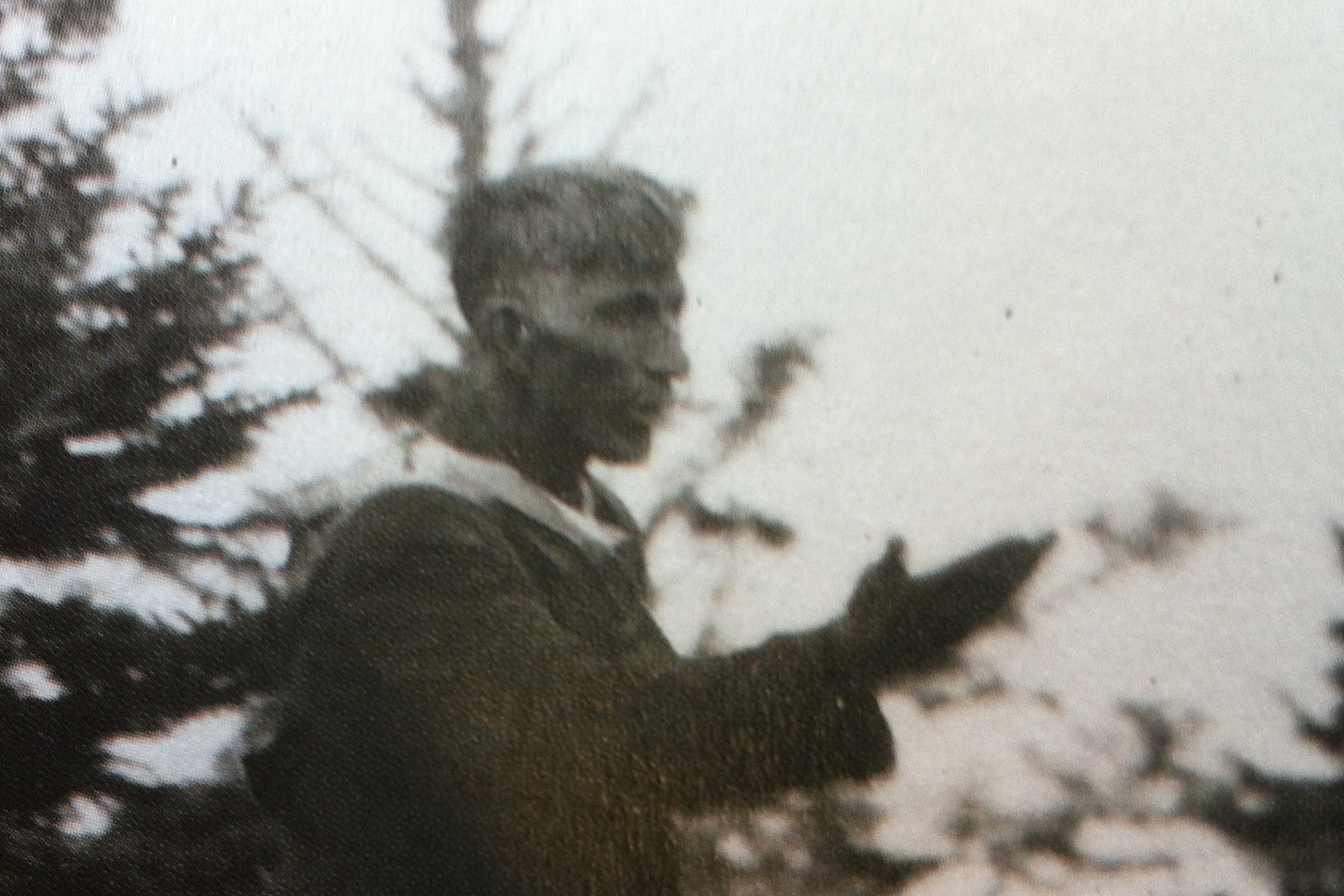
Chief Gabriel Sylliboy - first to fight for Treaty Rights in the Supreme Court of Nova Scotia, 1929

In August 1993, in Antigonish, Donald Marshall Jr. (who was from Cape Breton) caught 463 pounds of eels and sold them for $800 as part of a commercial fishery. He was violating federal laws by fishing without a licence in a closed season with illegal nets. Initially, Marshall's lawyer relied solely on the Treaty of 1752.

The Crown's expert historian Stephen Patterson dismantled the validity of the Treaty of 1752 that was used to support Marshall's case. Dr. Patterson indicated that the treaty did not apply to Mi’kmaq people outside of Shubenacadie and that the treaty was terminated by subsequent hostilities. (Chief Cope renounced and destroyed the Treaty himself six months after signing it.) Marshall's lawyers abandoned his reliance upon the Treaty of 1752, and switched his focus to the Halifax Treaties of 1760–61.

A significant provincial reconciliation event took place February 16, 2017. The Province of Nova Scotia granted the late Grand Chief Gabriel Sylliboy a posthumous free pardon. A free pardon, which recognizes that a conviction was made in error, considered “only in the rarest of circumstances,” marked just the second posthumously granted free pardon by the province of Nova Scotia. Lieutenant Governor J.J. Grant said that Sylliboy was pursuing his “aboriginal and treaty rights” and called the pardon “a process of treaty education,” which included “understanding and valuing what the Mi’kmaq have contributed in shaping this province and nation.”

== See also ==
- Treaty Day (Nova Scotia)
- Military history of Nova Scotia
- Military history of the Mi’kmaq People
- Treaty of Portsmouth (1713)
- Treaty of Casco (1678)
- Treaty of Watertown
- Halifax Treaties
