= Statue of Edward Cornwallis =

Statue in Halifax, Nova Scotia, Canada

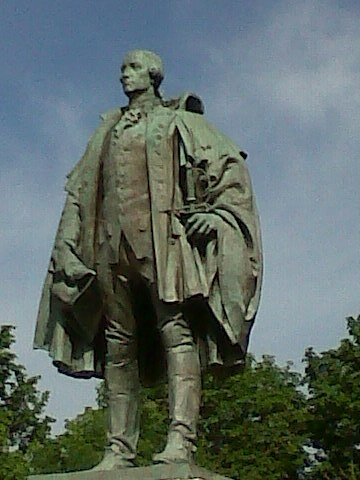
- Interactive map of Statue of Edward Cornwallis
- Location: Halifax, Nova Scotia, Canada (in storage)
- Designer: J. Massey Rhind
- Opening date: June 22, 1931
- Dedicated to: establishing Halifax and British rule of law
- Dismantled date: January 31, 2018

The Statue of Edward Cornwallis was a bronze sculpture of the military/political figure Edward Cornwallis atop a large granite pedestal with plaques. It had been erected in 1931 in an urban square in the south end of Halifax, Nova Scotia, opposite the Canadian National Railway station. Cornwallis was the Lieutenant Governor of Nova Scotia (1749–1752) and established Halifax in 1749. A Cornwallis Memorial Committee was struck in the 1920s and a statue was raised to pay tribute to Cornwallis and to promote tourism.

Since the 1980s the existence of the statue has generated significant controversy. To the Mi'kmaq First Nation, the first residents of the area, the statue symbolized the injustices they had suffered through the colonial period, and up to the present day. To many other Nova Scotians, the statue represented the founding of the city and had local historical value. According to historian John G. Reid, the conflicting viewpoints centred on the issue of historical memory, that is, "how the past should be publicly remembered."

In 2018, after several public protests at the site, the statue and pedestal were removed on order of the Halifax Regional Council, citing safety concerns and concerns about the statue being vandalized and placed in storage. In 2021, the park was renamed "Peace and Friendship Park".

== Cornwallis ==
During Cornwallis' term as Governor of Nova Scotia, he oversaw the founding of Halifax and Dartmouth, established the first law courts (court of General Sessions, County Court, and Supreme Court), erected forts at Grand Pre, Chignecto and Halifax, organized a militia of 840 men and established a public school for orphans. His administration also established the first Jewish community, the first German community and the first protestant dissenting congregation in present-day Canada.

The arrival of Cornwallis in 1749 was during a period of armed resistance by the indigenous Miꞌkmaq, who objected to the founding of Halifax and the British colonization of Miꞌkmaꞌki, their traditional lands. The Mi'kmaq militia executed raids upon British settlements and Cornwallis responded with orders to bring back the scalps of Mi'kmaq persons. The order was not effective and Father Le Loutre's War as it is known now, would continue past the term of Cornwallis, who resigned in 1752 and returned to England. The Mi'kmaq were defeated along with the French and Acadians in the French and Indian War and made peace with the British under the Halifax Treaties. The Mi'kmaq still contest the possession of Miꞌkmaꞌki and land claims actions are underway in New Brunswick and elsewhere.

== Construction ==
Nova Scotia Premier Edgar Nelson Rhodes set up the Cornwallis Memorial Committee in the late 1920s to erect a statue to recognize Edward Cornwallis as the "Founder of Halifax" and to promote tourism. The statue was made by J. Massey Rhind and unveiled on June 22, 1931, on the 182nd anniversary of Cornwallis' arrival to Halifax as Lieutenant Governor of Nova Scotia. It was positioned in the center of a paved area within the new Cornwallis Park, across the street from the train station and the new Nova Scotian Hotel. The CA$20,000 (equivalent to $400,488 in 2025) statue was paid for primarily by Canadian National Railway.

The statue is a 9 feet (2.7 m) tall bronze on a 10 feet (3.0 m) tall stone pedestal. The statue was modelled on Roman examples of statues of emperors, in a form of triumphalism. The design was deliberate. Archibald MacMechan who served on the Cornwallis Memorial Committee compared the founding of Halifax to that of ancient Rome, praising Cornwallis' "sterling manhood" and considering him an example to "men of English blood the world over [who] are accustomed to give voice to a just pride in the achievements of their race, as a colonizing power..."

During one of the speeches at the unveiling of the statue, Cornwallis was described as "a virile, strong, stand fast face with a touch of sternness in it which is usually to be found in the faces of all men who achieve – all leaders of men and all pioneers." The Mi'kmaq militia had executed armed resistance throughout Father Le Loutre's War, preventing the British from establishing a stronghold over Mi'kma'ki. The speeches at the unveiling of the Cornwallis statue played down the Mi'kmaq armed resistance, simply giving passing reference to the Mi'kmaq being obstacles to settlement.

== Statue controversy ==
Since the 1980s, the most notable advocate for the removal of the Cornwallis statue from a public space has been Daniel N. Paul, author of the 1993 book We Were Not the Savages. Paul has suggested renaming the park Donald Marshall Jr. Memorial Park and replacing the statue with one of Donald Marshall Jr., wrongly convicted of murder in his youth and a fighter for the rights of the Mi’kmaq people. The statue has been a site for protests since as least 2008, when several Mi'kmaq youth gathered at its base to mark the second annual Aboriginal Day of Action.

Historian John G. Reid asserts that the statue reflects the imperialist, colonial times of its creators in the early part of the twentieth century. Reid writes that the creation of the statue "was governed not by history but by a potent mixture of imperialism, a racially-charged triumphalism based on the savagery-civilization binary, state promotion, and an economic agenda." He writes further, "The ideology that had underpinned the raising of the statue had offered a strong and positive answer to any such concerns [of imperialist conquest] - the establishment of Halifax was a triumph of civilization over savagery, and Cornwallis was the city's courageous founder."

Reid identifies that Paul's work, along with historians from the 1980s onward, helped to highlight the violence used in the process of colonization. Reid suggests that Paul's work has been part of larger efforts to target Cornwallis in a symbolic manner, "representing the broader reality that colonization was not a benign process in which the significance of indigenous people was just that they were an inconvenient obstacle, but rather was an invasion and – like all invasions – was bitterly resisted."

There is also concern about the message the statue sends about Cornwallis. Dr Reid says, “When you have somebody on a pedestal in public place of that kind, then what you are doing essentially is validating that person.” Reid felt that the continued presence of the Cornwallis statue normalized the colonial process.

== Removal and eventual disposition ==
In April 2017, the city council voted to appoint an expert panel which would include Mi’kmaq representatives to recommend a way forward to deal with commemorations of Cornwallis in the city. During the Halifax Regional Council meeting, on July 18, 2017, an account from the group called Removing Cornwallis was read by Mayor Mike Savage, with respect to the group's Declaration for a Call to Action.

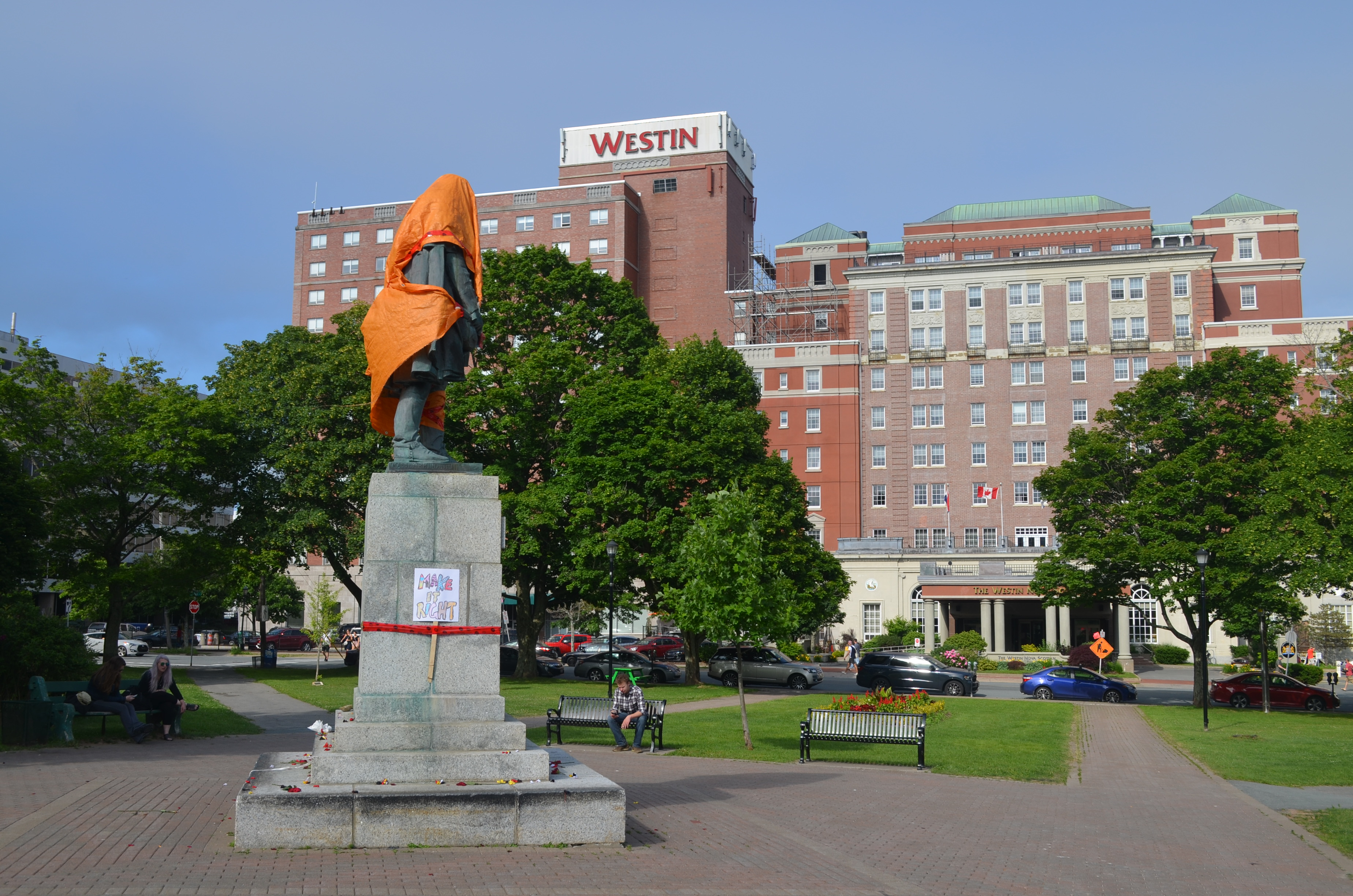
The covered statue on July 15, 2017

On July 1, 2017, a mourning ceremony was held at the Cornwallis statue site in Halifax. It was a ceremony to remember the missing indigenous women. It was disrupted by five members of the Canadian Armed Forces, calling themselves members of the right-wing Proud Boys. The five were suspended from the Forces and the Forces' leadership apologized. The incident was used to amplify Dan Paul's allegations against Cornwallis and to support the argument that, despite the wording of the Halifax Treaties, the Mi'kmaw never surrendered to the British and that Nova Scotia is unceded Mi'kmaq lands.

On July 15, a group of protesters arrived at the site with the intention of removing the statue. City of Halifax workers arrived and covered up the statue with a black tarpaulin. The shroud covered the statue for the duration of when the protesters were at the scene. The City crew removed their covering. However, an orange tarpaulin was attached to the statue to obscure it, later that evening.

On January 31, 2018, the statue was removed after City Council voted 12–4 in favour of moving the statue into storage. Both the statue and the stone pedestal on which it stood were placed in storage.

On January 28, 2019, Temma Frecker, a Nova Scotia teacher at The Booker School and member of the Monarchist League, was awarded the Governor General's History Awards for her students' proposal to retain the statue in Cornwallis Park. Her proposal was to include the Cornwallis statue among three other statues of Acadian Noël Doiron, Black Nova Scotian Viola Desmond and Mi'kmaw hereditary grand Chief John Denny Jr. The four statutes would be positioned as if in a conversation with each other, discussing their accomplishments and struggles.

The joint Halifax-Mi'kmaw task force on the commemorations of Cornwallis and Indigenous History recommended:

- establish a civic museum
- retain the statue in storage until the civic museum is established
- rename Cornwallis Street to New Horizons Street (later changed to Nora Bernard Street)
- rename Cornwallis Park to Peace and Friendship Park, and
- redesign Cornwallis Park to provide a performance space where the statue stood.

In 2020, the Halifax Council voted to accept the recommendations. The street and park have since been renamed.

== See also ==
- Statue of Winston Churchill (Halifax)
- List of public art in Halifax, Nova Scotia
- Military history of Nova Scotia
