= Miꞌkmaꞌki =

National territory of the Miꞌkmaq

- Pre-contact; ca. 4,000 y.b.p.?–1867 (as a sovereign state)
- Flag

- Location of Mi'kma'ki (dark green) – in Northern America (light green & dark grey) – in Wabanaki Confederacy (light green)
- Status: Confederated districts of Wabanaki (Unrecognized)
- Capital: Mniku, Unamaꞌkik; 45°42′N 60°46′W
- Common languages: Miꞌkmawiꞌsimk
- Demonym: Miꞌkmaq
- Government: Santeꞌ Mawioꞌmi / Miꞌkmawey Mawioꞌmi
- Kji Sagamaw
  - 1550–1611: Henri Membertou
  - 1792–1818: Francis Peck
  - 1818–1842: Michael Tooma
  - 1842–1869: Frank Tooma Jr.
  - 1869–1887: John Denny
  - 1918–1964: Gabriel Sylliboy
  - 1964–1991: Donald Marshall Sr.
  - 1991–2017: Benjamin Sylliboy
  - 2019–present: Norman Sylliboy
- Sagamaq
- Putu's
- History
  - Established: Pre-contact; ca. 4,000 y.b.p.?
  - Contact with John Cabot: 1497
  - Exclusion from the Treaty of Utrecht: 1713
  - First treaty with Great Britain after the Anglo–Wabanaki War: 1725
  - Indian Act, 1876: 1867 (as a sovereign state)

Population
  - pre-1500: 35,000–75,000
  - 1620: 4,000
  - 1750: 2,500
  - 1901: >3,308
  - 2021: 70,640
- Currency: Wabanaki wampum (historically); Canadian dollar and U.S. dollar also used in contemporary era
- Today part of: Canada

ni'kmaq / l'nuk "my friends" / "people"
- Person: Miꞌkmaw (L'nu)
- People: Miꞌkmaq (Lnu'k)
- Language: Miꞌkmawi'simk
- Country: Miꞌkmaꞌki; Wapna'ki

Miꞌkmaꞌki, also spelled Miꞌgmaꞌgi, is composed of the traditional and current territories, or country, of the Miꞌkmaq people, located in Wabanakia, or the Dawnland region, along the north east coast of North America (or Turtle Island). Portions within Canada are protected under the Peace and Friendship Treaties signed with the British Crown in the 1700’s and the territories of Miꞌkmaꞌki overlap with the Canadian provinces of Nova Scotia, New Brunswick, Prince Edward Island, and eastern Quebec, as well as parts of the U.S. state of Maine.

The Miꞌkmaw homeland is sub-divided into seven geographical and traditional districts with Newfoundland island designated Taqamkuk and being separately represented as an eighth district, formerly joined with Cape Breton Island designated Unama'ki. As of 2025, governance over the Miꞌkmaw nation is delegated to a number of First Nations, such as the Eskasoni and Potlotek First Nations, the latter of which is home to Mniku, the traditional capital—or fire—of Miꞌkmaw Country. Historically and in the 21st century, the various Miꞌkmaw communities are governed by a centralized council, the Santeꞌ (or Miꞌkmawey) Mawioꞌmi, composed of district chiefs (Saqamaq), a women's council (Saqamaꞌsgw), wampum keepers (Putuꞌs), and headed by a Grand Chief, or Kji Sagamaw, who as of 2025 is Norman Sylliboy.

== Etymology ==
The name Miꞌkmaꞌki is composed of two elements: The first references the Miꞌkmaw nation, whose name comes from the Miꞌkmawi'simk word ni'kmaq meaning 'my kin-friends'. The second element comes from the Algonquian word for 'land'—*axkyi in Proto-Algonquian—which can be seen in the name of neighbouring countries like Ndakinna, Nitaskinan, Nitassinan, and Anishinaabewaki, as well as in the name for the Dawnland region, Wapna'ki.

Alongside Miꞌkmaꞌki, there are additional ways to describe the Miꞌkmaw homeland. Both Miꞌkmaw homeland and Miꞌkmaw Country use the adjectival and singular form of Miꞌkmaq. Within the language, one can also say gm'tginu, as in the example sentence from the Miꞌkmaq Online Talking Dictionary: Gm'tginu, mnaq ignmuetug aq mnaq naqtmug! meaning "Our territory, we've never given it away and we've never left it!"

== History ==
According to tradition. Miꞌkmaq go back to the time of Glooscap, a legendary cultural hero and first human in Wabanaki mythology. Miꞌkmaw legend says that when the large and powerful Glooscap finished painting the splendour of the world, he dipped his brush into a blend of all the colours and created Epekwitk—his favourite island—which would be his pillow and Enmigtaqamu'g as his bed as he slept.

Miꞌkmaw oral history recalls a time when the world was covered in water. It was then that the being Sebanees, arriving in kjiktu'lnu ('our great boat'), landed on the shores of Epekwitk. The boat, made of ice, carried all the animals and fish his family would need for survival, and it is said that Epekwitk's unique land formation was a result of the melting of the ice boat. Archaeological evidence, such as shell middens and campsite remains, corroborate Miꞌkmaw stories which indicate an ancient presence in Miꞌkmaꞌki, with dates ranging from 5,000 to 12,000 years ago. Prior to European colonization of the Americas, Miꞌkmaq engaged in varied relations with neighbouring nations, such as the Wolastoqiyik (Maliseet), Passamaquoddy, and Abenaki, with whom they formed the Wabanaki Confederacy in Dawnland. According to Miꞌkmaq traditions recorded by S. T. Rand, the Kwēdĕchk were the original inhabitants of the land. The two tribes engaged in a war that lasted "many years", and involved the "slaughter of men, women, and children, and torture of captives", and the eventual displacement of the Kwēdĕchk by the victorious Miꞌkmaq.

Archeological evidence shows human habitation in the region by 4,000 years before present. Research published in 1871 showed that some Miꞌkmaq believed they had emigrated from the west, and then lived alongside the Kwēdĕchk.

Following European contact, Miꞌkmaꞌki was colonized by the French as Acadia and the British in modern Nova Scotia, who made competing claims for the land. Siding with the French, the Miꞌkmaq fought alongside other Wabanaki warriors during the French and Indian Wars, between 1688 and 1763. These European powers divided Miꞌkmaꞌki in the treaties of Utrecht (1715) and Paris (1763). After the latter, when France ceded its territories east of the Mississippi River to Britain, the British claimed Miꞌkmaꞌki as their possession by conquest. The defeated Miꞌkmaq signed the Peace and Friendship Treaties to end hostilities and encourage cooperation between the Wabanaki nations and the British. They wanted to ensure the survival of the Miꞌkmaw people, whose numbers had dwindled to a few thousand from disease, starvation, and warfare.

The power held within Miꞌkmaꞌki faded further after the Confederation of Canada in 1867 united the colonies, establishing four provinces. The Dominion of Canada passed the Indian Act in 1876, which resulted in the loss of autonomous governance among the First Nations. Whilst some analysts have advanced legal arguments that the Peace and Friendship treaties legitimized the takeover of the land by Britain, the Miꞌkmaq maintain that they have never conceded sovereignty of their traditional lands.

For more than 100 years, until 2020, the Santeꞌ Mawioꞌmi (or Grand Council) was limited to functioning solely as a spiritual and dialogue forum. The Miꞌkmaq and other First Nations were required to elect representatives for their federally-imposed band governments. In 2020, however, by agreement with the Government of Canada, the Grand Council was authorized to consult on behalf of the Miꞌkmaw First Nations.

== Governance ==
Traditionally each Miꞌkmaq district had its own independent government. Those governments were composed of a chief (saqamaw; plural: saqamaq) and a council. The council included the band chiefs, elders, and other important leaders, such as soldiers (sma'gnisg; sing.:sma'gnis). The role of the councils was similar to those of any independent government and included the ability to make laws, establish a justice system, divide the common territory among the people for hunting and fishing, make war, and search for peace.

The overarching Grand Council (Santeꞌ Mawioꞌmi) is composed of the keptinaq (captains or district chiefs, or saqamaq) as well as elders, putu's (historians reading the wampum belts), and a women's council (Saqama'sgw). The Santeꞌ Mawioꞌmi, also called the Miꞌkmawey Mawioꞌmi, was headed by a Kji Sagamaw, or Grand Chief, who was one of the district chiefs, generally the Unama'kik chief, with hereditary succession. As of 2025, the Kji Sagamaw is Norman Sylliboy. The seat of the Grand Council was generally on Unama'kik at Mniku, and it still functions as the capital as of 2025 in the Potlotek First Nation. In co-ordination with the Grand Council, administrative governance across Miꞌkmaꞌki is currently relegated to the thirty First Nations governments.

=== Districts ===
Miꞌkmaꞌki hosts eight administrative divisions called districts, each headed by a keptinaq, or district chief. The eight districts are the following (names are spelled in the Francis-Smith orthography, followed by the Listuguj orthography in parentheses):

- Epekwitk aq Piktuk (Epegwitg aq Pigtug)
- Eskikewa'kik (Esge'gewa'gi)
- Kespek (Gespe'gewa'gi)
- Kespukwitk (Gespugwitg)
- Siknikt (Signigtewa'gi)
- Sipekni'katik (Sugapune'gati)
- Unama'kik (Unama'gi)
- Ktaqamkuk (Gtaqamg).

=== Law ===
The Miꞌkmaw legal system is called Netukulimk. It is best defined as "the use of the natural bounty provided by the Creator for the self-support and well-being of the individual and the community. A foundation of Netukulimk is achieving adequate standards of community nutrition and economic well-being without jeopardizing the integrity, diversity, or productivity of our environment." Within the conceptual framework of Netukulimk, Miꞌkmaw law functions as the foundation of sustaining Miꞌkmaw families, communities, and society. This mindset understands the whole of life to be interconnected, describing the rights and responsibilities of the Mi’kmaq with their families, communities, nation, and eco-system.

Miꞌkmaꞌki is subject to both Canadian law—with its foundations in the English common law and French civil code systems—and Netukulimk. Despite the terms of the Peace and Friendship Treaties outlining a model of co-existence, Euro-Canadian laws increasingly superseded Miꞌkmaw law, especially after the passing of the Indian Act and the imposition of Canadian Aboriginal law. Today, Miꞌkmaq are working with federal and provincial governments, as well as other organizations and groups, in order to restore the role and place of Netukulimk within Miꞌkmaꞌki. One method of doing so is through a process coined by Elder Albert Marshall called two-eyed seeing or etuaptmumk. Etuaptmumk is a concept that stresses the importance of balancing both Miꞌkmaw and Canadian worldviews, laws, and wisdom.

== Geography ==
Miꞌkmaw Country is located on the northeastern coast of North America where it is surrounded by several bodies of water: the Atlantic Ocean to the east, the Gulf of Maine to the south, and the Gulf of St. Lawrence to the north. Between the districts of Siknikt, Sipekni'katik, and Kespukwitk lies the bay Bakudabakek (Bay of Fundy); Cabot Strait separates the islands of Unama'ki and Ktaqamkuk, with the Strait of Belle Isle separating the latter from the mainland. The continental shelf off Ktaqamkuk is known as the Grand Banks, and it (along with the coast off of Enmigtaqamu'g—the mainland districts of Eskikewa'kik, Sipekni'katik, and Kespukwitk) is where the cold Labrador Current and the warm Gulf Stream meet, making the area not only one of the richest fishing grounds in the world, but also one of the foggiest areas. Today, Miꞌkmaꞌki is better known as Eastern or Atlantic Canada.

=== Climate ===
Much of Miꞌkmaꞌki is classified as a humid continental climate, kept moderate by the ocean, with elevated and northerly regions classified as a subarctic climate. Coastal regions—notably Enmigtaqamu'g, Unama'ki, and Ktaqamkuk—are often subject to coastal fog. The country also faces yearly cyclonic storms referred to as nor'easters.

Average daily maximum and minimum temperatures for selected locations across Miꞌkmaꞌki
Location	July (°C)	July (°F)	January (°C)	January (°F)
Petitcodiac	24/13	76/55	−3/−14	25/7
Miramichi	25/13	77/54	−5/−16	23/2
Kjipuktuk	23/14	73/58	0/−8	32/17
Chéticamp	24/14	74/57	8/0	46/32
Keespongwitk	21/12	69/55	1/−7	33/19
St. John's	20/11	68/52	−1/−9	30/16
Gander	21/11	71/51	−3/−12	26/11

== See also ==
- Miꞌkmaq
- Grand Council (Mi'kmaq)
- Miꞌkmaq hieroglyphic writing
