= Sylliboy =

Sylliboy or Syliboy is a surname. Notable people with the surname include:

- Alan Syliboy (born 1952), Canadian artist
- Benjamin Sylliboy (1941–2017), Miꞌkmaq Grand Chief
- Gabriel Sylliboy (1874–1964), Miꞌkmaq Grand Chief
- Norman Sylliboy, Miꞌkmaq Grand Chief
