= Jacques-Pierre Peminuit Paul =

Grand Chief of the Mi'kmaq

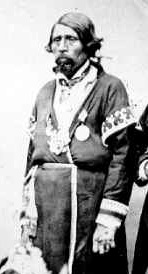
Jacques-Pierre Peminuit Paul with medal from Pope Pius IX, 1856

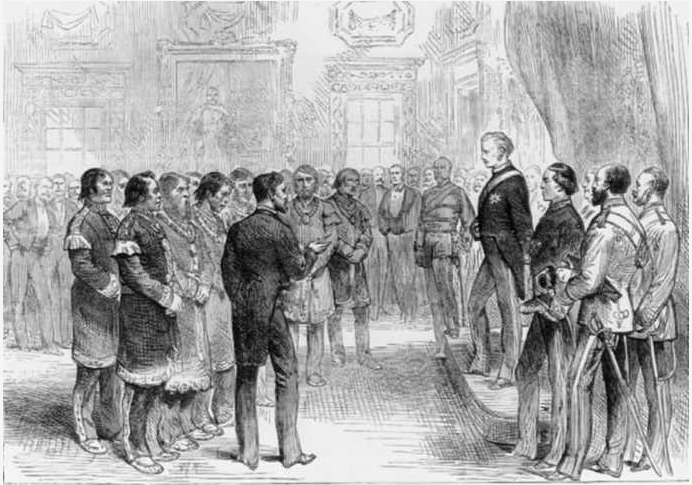
Grand Chief Jacques-Pierre Peminuit Paul (3rd from left with beard) meets Governor General of Canada, Marquess of Lorne, Red Chamber, Province House, Halifax, Nova Scotia, 1879

Jacques-Pierre Peminuit Paul was a Grand Chief of the Mi'kmaq who lived at Shubenacadie, Nova Scotia. He was most well known for his shamanic abilities.

On 15 September 1856, Paul was confirmed as grand chief by Archbishop William Walsh at St. Mary's Basilica (Halifax), receiving a medal from Pope Pius IX and a written endorsement from the Lt. Governor, Sir John Gaspard Le Marchant.

In 1879, Paul met with the Governor General of Canada, the Marquess of Lorne, in the Red Chamber, Province House, Halifax, Nova Scotia.

== See also ==
- List of grand chiefs (Mi'kmaq)
- Grand Council (Mi'kmaq)
