= Norman Sylliboy =

Canadian politician

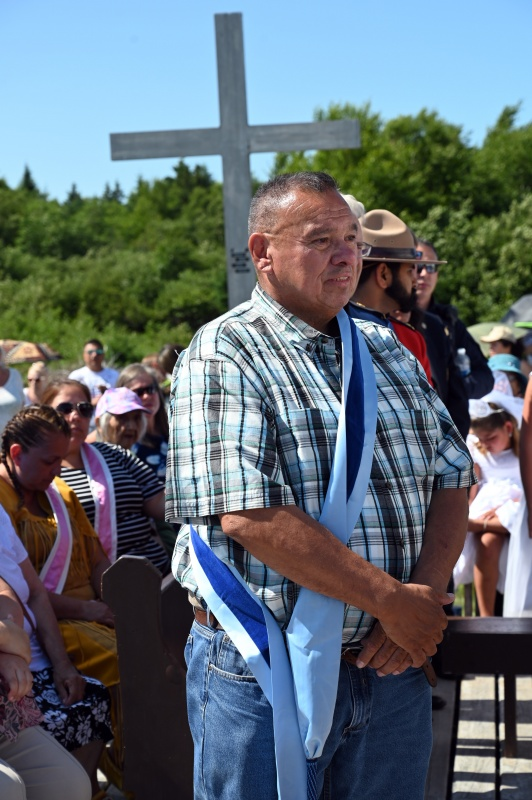

11th Grand Chief of the Mi'kmaq
- In office 1 August 2019 – present
- Preceded by: Benjamin Kji Saqmaw Sylliboy

Personal details
- Born: Eskasoni, Unama'ki, Mi'kma'ki (Cape Breton, Nova Scotia)
- Height: 175 cm (5 ft 9 in)
- Spouse: Arlene Sylliboy (m. 1982)
- Children: Anastasia Jileen Sylliboy (deceased); Alyssia Giselle (Sylliboy) Jeddore; Norman Jay Sylliboy; Danielle Blynn Theresa Sylliboy; Norlene Joanna Sylliboy; Norton Arman Jay Sylliboy; Norris Taylor Sylliboy
- Parents: Athanasius Sylliboy (father); Theresa (Johnson) Sylliboy (mother)
- Relatives: Gabriel Sylliboy (grandfather)
- Occupation: Social worker

Norman Sylliboy is the 11th Grand Chief or Kji-Saqmaw of the Mi'kmaq Nation. The Mi’kmaw traditional government is known as Sante' Mawio’mi or Grand Council.

Sylliboy was elected in 2019, two years after the death of his predecessor, Ben Sylliboy. Norman Sylliboy's grandfather Gabriel Sylliboy was elected in 1918 to the position of Grand Chief.

== Early life ==
Sylliboy was born at a Eskasoni First Nation reserve in Unamaꞌki (Cape Breton Island) to a Mi'kmaq family filled with culture and traditions. His family owned the first store in over forty years on the island Mniku in Potlotek. Before becoming Grand Chief of Mi’kmaq, he worked as a social worker and worked for Mi’kmaw Family and Children Services of Nova Scotia.

== Political career ==
Sylliboy was selected as Grand Chief of the Mi’kmaq on 1 August 2019, succeeding his father, Ben, who died two years prior. The selection for Grand Chief took place in St. Anne's Mission at Potlotek First Nation, Chapel Island, Nova Scotia. The selection process included several rounds of selection until the council unanimously elected Sylliboy.

"I want to thank Niskkam (God-Creator). Thank the Grand Council for having faith in me and I want to thank all my family and their family in me. I want to thank Mi’kmaq Nation, from the bottom of my heart I want to thank each and everyone one of you."

=== Response to COVID-19 ===
As Grand Chief, along with then-Chief Paul Prosper of the Paqꞌtnkek First Nation and then-Premier Stephen McNeil, Sylliboy urged people to stay home during the pandemic.

They emphasized prioritizing the health of elders and other vulnerable community members.

=== Mi'kmaq Language Act ===
The Mi'kmaq Language Act recognizes Mi'kmaq as an official language of Nova Scotia. Then-Minister of L’nu Affairs Karla MacFarlane first announced the government's plan to enact this legislation in October 2021. They have plans to take more steps in the promotion of the language because of the decreasing number of Mi'kmaq speakers. Sylliboy stated:

"The governments of the past attacked us through our language when our children were punished for speaking it, but despite all of the efforts to destroy it, our language is still here and we are still here, and that shows our resilience as a people."

=== Politics within the Mi'kmaq ===
In 2011, the Canadian government announced the recognition of a group in Newfoundland and Labrador called the Qalipu First Nation. The landless band had accepted 25,000 people to be members of the community. The community had received over 100,000 applications, and it was authorized for the new applicants to be reviewed.

The Grand Council and other Mi'kmaq organizations initially argued against the legitimacy of these new members.

== Personal life ==
Sylliboy married Arlene Sylliboy on 22 May 1982, having seven children together. They also have ten grandchildren together.
