= Peace and Friendship Treaties =

First Nation treaties with Britain, 1725–1779

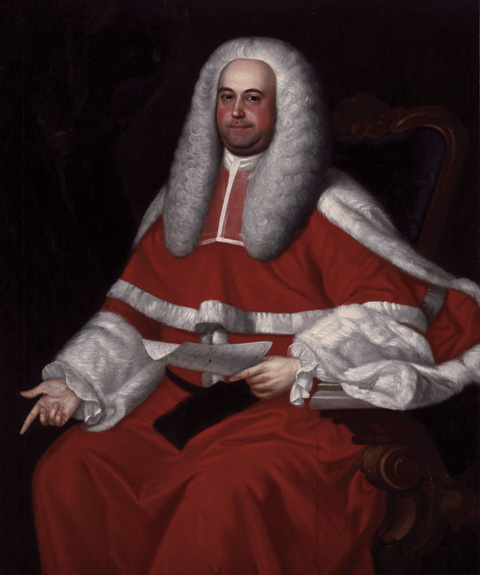
Governor Jonathan Belcher by John Singleton Copley. Belcher with the Nova Scotia Council created the Halifax Treaties of 1760–61.

The Peace and Friendship Treaties were a series of written documents (or, treaties) that Britain signed bearing the Authority of Great Britain between 1725 and 1779 with various Mi’kmaq, Wolastoqiyik (Maliseet), Abenaki, Penobscot, and Passamaquoddy peoples (i.e., the Wabanaki Confederacy) living in parts of what are now the Maritime and Gaspé region in Canada and the northeastern United States. Primarily negotiated to reaffirm the peace after periods of war and to facilitate trade, these treaties remain in effect to this day.

The Peace and Friendship Treaties include the Halifax Treaties. These are 11 treaties signed between 1760 and 1761 by the various bands of the Miꞌkmaq (as well as other Indigenous peoples) (Note: There were also Halifax Treaties signed with the Wolastoqiyik (Maliseet) and the Passamaquoddy.) and the British in Halifax, Nova Scotia. These agreements ended the conflict that had persisted between the two peoples for 85 years.

The Halifax Treaties include both military submissions—or oaths of allegiance made at the three fortresses in the region followed by treaties signed at Halifax—as well as the oral promises made during Treaty ceremonies to guarantee the Mi'kmaq the protection and rights as British subjects. The ceremony with the most primary sources was the Burying the Hatchet ceremony, which happened on 25 June 1761. While most historians have concluded that the language of “submission” in the Treaties plainly reflect that the Mi'kmaq surrender to the British, other historians have suggested otherwise. In the late 20th century Mi'kmaq have asserted the Treaties did not mean surrender, particularly of the land. The language used in these documents was written in the way that put the Indigenous nations who agreed to them at a disadvantage. Fundamental concepts and values relating to land differed and continue to differ between Indigenous Nations and settlers.

== Context ==
The Mi'kmaq had a complex, consensus-based governance system. While they were united by common ties of language, culture, and kinship, the Mi'kmaq were also a highly decentralized people, made up of autonomous local communities, each of which had its own sakamow, or chief. Although they often met to deliberate issues of importance to the Nation, there was no central authority that could act for all. Once treaty terms were established, runners were sent to each community to communicate the terms. Communities then debated whether they would ratify a particular treaty, after which they would usually attend a signing ceremony in a central location, such as the capital, Halifax. (Note: For a more detailed discussion of Mi'kmaq Governance and the Treaty Process, see: Francis, Rosalie. 2003. "The Mi’kmaq nation and the Embodiment of Political Ideologies: Ni’kmaq, Protocol and Treaty Negotiations in the Eighteenth Century" (M.A. Thesis). Saint Mary’s University.)

The Mi'kmaq also had experience in treaty-making and some experience with international diplomacy. They had formed the Wabanaki Confederacy with the Wolastoqiyik (Maliseet), Passamaquoddy, Penobscot, and Abenaki, possibly prior to European arrival, and had also entered into a broader alliance with the Iroquois and the Odawa in the late 17th century. Both alliances lasted for centuries. Further, the Wabanaki Confederacy had been capable of inviting the French to settle in their territory in 1603 and maintaining a consistent peace with the French, although they never created treaties. The Mi'kmaq did, however, enter into a Concordat with the Vatican in 1610.

== Treaties of 1725 and 1726 ==
British attempts to legalize the relationship through treaty-making between the Mi'kmaq initially had limited success. The first treaty, the Treaty of Boston (or Dummer’s Treaty), which was negotiated by the Penobscot in 1725, formally brought an end to the Dummer's War, a three-year-long conflict between the Wabanaki and the New England Colonies. One year later, in 1726, the Mi’kmaq and Wolastoqiyik in present-day Nova Scotia and New Brunswick—as well as the Abenaki and Passamaquoddy in Massachusetts (including Maine) and New Hampshire—signed what was essentially the same agreement, often referred to as Mascarene’s Treaty (named for military officer Paul Mascarene). (Note: For a detailed discussion of the treaty process of 1725–1726, see Patterson, Stephen E. 1999. "Anatomy of a Treaty: Nova Scotia’s First Native Treaty in Historical Context." UNB Law Journal 48(1999):41–64.) The 1725–26 Treaties would be the first peace agreement signed by the Mi’kmaq with Britain.

By signing the 1725–26 Treaty, the Indigenous peoples agreed to cease hostilities against Britain; and in exchange, the British promised not to interfere with Indigenous hunting, fishing, and farming.

== Treaty of 1749 ==
The 1725–26 agreement largely kept the peace until the outbreak of King George's War/the War of the Austrian Succession in 1744.

Following the end of that conflict, Governor of Nova Scotia Edward Cornwallis invited the two Indigenous nations to sign a new treaty, hoping to secure control over lands west of the Missaguash River and to reconfirm loyalty to the Crown. The new Treaty at Halifax was signed by the Wolastoqiyik and the Chignecto Mi’kmaq on 15 August 1749, renewing the 1725 Boston Treaty without adding new terms.

Most other Mi’kmaq leaders, however, refused to attend the 1749 peace talks in protest of the governor’s founding of Halifax that year. In response to three Mi'kmaq raids on the British, Cornwallis created a proclamation to drive the Mi'kmaq off the peninsula. Posted was a reward of 10 guineas (increased to 50 guineas in June 1750) for any Mi’kmaq captured or scalped in the region.

== Anglo-Mi’kmaq War (1749–60) and the Treaty of 1752 ==
Hostilities between the Mi’kmaq and the British during the late 1740s initiated the first phase of the Anglo-Mi’kmaq War (1749–60). Supported by Acadian and French militiamen, Mi’kmaq fighters carried out military strikes against the British, which would add on to the larger French and Indian War (1754–63).

On 22 November 1752, fighting momentarily ceased for the signing of a treaty at Halifax by Chief Jean-Baptiste Cope of the Shubenacadie (Sipekne’katik) Mi’kmaq, and Governor of Nova Scotia Peregrine Hopson. (In 2002, the Sipekne’katik First Nation erected a monument in honour of Cope and the signing of the 1752 treaty.) The Treaty was renounced six months after it was signed.

In 1755, the Mi'kmaq and their French allies conducted the Northeastern Coast Campaign in Maine. They extended this campaign into Nova Scotia, attacking colonists during the 1756 raids on Lunenburg. The Anglo-Mi’kmaq War thus resumed when members of the Wabanaki Confederacy sided with France against Britain in the Seven Years War (1756–63), the global conflict of which the French and Indian War was the part in North America.

Following the British military successes with capture of Louisbourg in 1758, Quebec in 1759, and Montreal in 1760, French imperial power in North America was destroyed. There were just 300 Mi’kmaq fighters in the region compared to many more British regulars and rangers. After the defeat of the French, the Mi'kmaq no longer had a source of guns and ammunition to fight or hunt. The Mi'kmaq immediately asked the British for guns and ammunition, claiming that "the French always Supplyed [sic] Them with these Things and They expect that we will do the Same." According to those at Louisbourg, after the defeat the Mi'kmaq wanted bread and had "no prospect of relief." By the spring of 1760, General Jeffery Amherst determined that the Mi'kmaq posed no significant threat to British control of the region, and that colonial forces were adequate to meet the defence needs of Nova Scotia. (Note: As a result, British began closing down forts such as Fort Ellis.)

== The Halifax Treaties ==
By 1760, France lost Quebec and other key holdings to the British. Peace-treaty negotiations with the British began by the Wabanaki soon after.

A treaty by the Wolastoqiyik (Maliseet) and the Passamaquoddy was concluded at Halifax on 22 February 1760, and later ratified by individual Maliseet and Passamaquoddy communities at Fort Frederick (in what is now Saint John, New Brunswick). This Maliseet–Passamaquoddy Treaty formed the basis on which later treaties were signed with individual Mi'kmaq communities in 1760 and 1761.

The first of the Mi'kmaq treaties was signed on 10 March 1760 with three communities: the Sipekne’katik, La Have, and Richibuctou Mi'kmaq. The Treaty of 1761 was finalized with communities from Cape Breton, Miramichi, Pokemouche, Shediac, who all signed on June 25 in a 'Burying the Hatchet' ceremony. The 1761 Treaty was later signed by the Chignecto/Missiquash on July 8, and the Pictou/Malogomich on October 12.

Unlike the Maliseet–Passamaquoddy Treaty, the Halifax Treaties with the Mi'kmaq did not explicitly renew earlier treaties that were negotiated between the Mi'kmaq and the British. One historian has argued that, for many Mi'kmaq communities, they had never subscribed to earlier Nova Scotia treaties, so there was thus nothing to renew. However, others have pointed out continuity between the 1726 treaty and those signed in 1760 and 1761, notably, that the first six articles of the Halifax Treaties correspond to the first six articles of the 1726 treaty, with some modifications. As such, it seems that the British and the Mi'kmaq considered the 1726 treaty to form the basis of their relationship.

All of the Halifax Treaties began with the Mi'kmaq chief acknowledging the jurisdiction and dominion of the British monarch King George over the territories of Nova Scotia. The Mi'kmaq promised: to not molest the British colonists; to make restitution for robbery or violence and use the law courts to resolve conflicts; to free British prisoners; to have nothing further to do with the French; and to report any French actions against the British. Lastly, they agreed to confine their trade to government "truckhouses," where they would leave some of their numbers as hostages to guarantee their good behaviour.

The Supreme Court of Canada has interpreted the "truckhouse" clause as providing a right to hunt, fish, and gather in order to secure necessary goods for trade and thereby earn a moderate livelihood. The Court noted that restricting trade with their enemies like the French while undermining unregulated private traders, was seen as important to cementing the fragile peace.

Many historians have concluded that the treaties clearly indicate that the Mi'kmaq acceded to the authority of the British. The Halifax Treaties do not stipulate the surrender of Mi'kmaq territory, which the British Crown already controlled by conquest. Some historians have suggested that, because the Halifax Treaties did not specifically stipulate the surrender of land by the Mi'kmaq, that the British Crown did not claim the land through the treaty. (Earlier Treaties did not stipulate land ownership, however, future treaties in other parts of Canada do mention land ownership.)

Oral promises made during treaty ceremonies to guarantee the Mi'kmaq the same rights as other British subjects is also considered by some historians as an important part of the understanding of the treaty relationship.

At the Burying the Hatchet Ceremony in 1761, Governor of Nova Scotia Jonathan Belcher told the Mi'kmaq that the "Laws will be like a great Hedge about your Rights and properties." Belcher told the Mi'kmaq were now British subjects and that those in Nova Scotia are "your fellow subjects." Further, he indicated that the Mi'kmaq would fight alongside other British subjects, side by side, "that your cause of war and peace may be the same as ours under one mighty Chief and King, under the Same Laws and for the same Rights and Liberties." This is sometimes referred to as Belcher’s Proclamation, which confirmed the intention of Britain to protect the land rights of the Mi’kmaq.

The Mi'kmaq Chief from Cape Breton concurred:

As long as the Sun and Moon shall endure ... so long will I be your friend and ally, submitting myself to the Laws of your Government, faithful and obedient to the Crown.

The Mi'kmaq began their accommodation with British law, as they had promised. The British, according to historian Stephen Patterson (2009), "accepted a continuing role for existing Mi'kmaw [Mi'kmaq] polities within the limits of British sovereignty." For example, when the province of New Brunswick was being established in 1784, after the huge influx of Loyalist refugees following the American War of Independence (1775-83), Mi’kmaq were asking that "certain lands be reserved and protected to them by licenses of occupation, similar to those being issued to new settlers."

== Treaties of 1778 and 1779 ==
During the beginning of the American Revolution and the Invasion of Canada in 1775, the Americans attempted to recruit the Mi’kmaq to fight against the British. The British, in response, sought to confirm bonds of peace and friendship with Indigenous allies in Eastern Canada. The Superintendent of Indian Affairs in Nova Scotia, Michael Francklin, attended a meeting in which the Mi’kmaq renewed their oath of allegiance to the British Crown.

On 24 September 1778, Wolastoqiyik delegates from the Saint John River area and Mi’kmaq representatives from Richibuctou, Miramichi, and Chignecto signed an agreement promising not to assist the Americans in the Revolution and to follow their "hunting and fishing in a peaceable and quiet manner." When conflict did happen between a small group of Mi’kmaq and the British on the Miramichi, the local Mi’kmaq leadership approved the British capture of the rebels, the removal of the rebel chief, and the appointment of a new chief. The Mi’kmaq provided a copy of the 1760 Treaty for the new chief to sign.

The following year, in 1779, Mi’kmaq chiefs from Cape Tormentine to Chaleur Bay signed a similar peace agreement with the British, guaranteeing fishing and hunting rights: "The said Indians and their Constituents, shall remain in the Districts before mentioned, quiet and free from any molestation of any of His Majesty's Troops, or other his good Subjects in their Hunting and Fishing." This guarantee was later confirmed by the Court of Appeal of New Brunswick in R v Paul, 1980. According to Patterson, the "vast majority of Mi’kmaq did not join in challenging British authority – to the contrary they took steps to aid British military and civilian officials in suppressing the disorders and restoring peace."

During the American Revolution, the Americans signed the Treaty of Watertown with the Mi’kmaq as a means of drawing their support away from the British. The Mi'kmaq continued to pressure the British government throughout the 19th century to have the British live up to the Treaties and treat the Mi'kmaq like full British subjects as they did those from other cultures who were British subjects.

== Legacy ==
=== Case law ===
Beginning in the 20th century, various descendants of the Indigenous signatories of the Peace and Friendship Treaties have taken the Government of Canada to court in an attempt to recognize and protect their treaty rights.

==== R v Sylliboy, 1927 ====
In 1927, Gabriel Sylliboy, Grand Chief of the Mi’kmaq Grand Council, was charged with off-season hunting. In R v Sylliboy, the Grand Chief argued that the Treaty of 1752 protected his right to hunt on the territory in question. According to Mi’kmaq law professor Naiomi Metallic, this was the first time treaty rights were used as a defence in a court of law. Sylliboy was unable to convince the court of his treaty rights and was consequently convicted of his charges. In 2017, nearly 90 years after the ruling the Government of Nova Scotia pardoned Sylliboy of his convictions (though Sylliboy had passed in 1964).

==== Simon v The Queen, 1985 ====
In 1980, James Matthew Simon, a member of the Sipekne’katik First Nation (Mi’kmaq) in Nova Scotia, was charged with violating provincial hunting regulations. Simon argued that the Treaty of 1752 gave him the right to hunt and fish freely in the area. The Province of Nova Scotia argued on the contrary, stating that subsequent conflicts between the British and the Mi’kmaq terminated these treaty rights.

The case of Simon v The Queen went to the Supreme Court of Canada in 1985. The judges recognized Mi’kmaq rights to hunt for food and ruled that treaty rights had not in fact been terminated. Simon was subsequently acquitted of the charges, marking the first time that the courts had affirmed the rights of the Mi’kmaq people as set out in the Treaty of 1752.

In 1986, a year following the Simon case, Treaty Day in Nova Scotia was held for the first time on October 1, the day that the Treaty of 1752 designated for renewing friendship between the Mi’kmaq and the Crown. Today, Treaty Day is celebrated annually on the first of October to commemorates the signing of the 1760–61 Peace and Friendship Treaties.

==== R v Marshall, 1993 ====
In August 1993, Donald Marshall Jr., a member of the Membertou First Nation (Mi’kmaq), was arrested and charged for fishing violations in Nova Scotia. Marshall argued that the treaties of 1760 and 1761 enshrined his right to catch and sell fish. R v Marshall was taken to the Supreme Court of Canada in 1993. Six years later, in September 1999, the Court ruled that the hunting and fishing rights guaranteed to the Indigenous signatories in the Treaty had never been terminated, and thus, the living descendants of these peoples in the Maritimes and in Quebec are not subject to government regulations governing hunting, fishing, or land use.

=== "Peace" and "Friendship" ===
Some historians deny that the term "submission" in the Treaties means that the Mi'kmaq surrendered. They focus solely on the terms "Peace" and "Friendship" in the treaties.

Such historians argue that the Mi'kmaq did not surrender and that, in fact, Nova Scotia is "unceded Mi'kmaw [Mi'kmaq] territory." To sustain this argument, some historians have argued that the few hundred Mi'kmaq fighters were in a strong enough position to negotiate the terms of the Halifax Treaties and make demands of their own of the British. Historian John G. Reid asserts that the Mi'kmaq military power in the region did not wane until decades after the French had been defeated. Reid dismisses the statements in the Treaties about Mi'kmaq surrender or submission to the British crown, by asserting that there is significant evidence surrounding the Treaties that suggest the real intent of the Treaties was to establish friendly and reciprocal relationships. The Mi'kmaq leaders who came initially to Halifax in 1760 had clear goals that centred on the making of peace, the establishment of a secure and well-regulated trade in commodities such as furs, and ongoing friendship with the British crown. In return, they offered their own friendship and tolerance of limited British settlement, although without any formal land surrender. To fulfil the friendly and reciprocal intent of the treaties, Reid asserts further British settlement of land would need to be negotiated and, in exchange for sharing the land, presents would be given to the Mi'kmaq. According to historian Geoffrey Plank, the documents summarizing the peace agreements did not indicate the laws regulating land ownership and land usage, but they assured the Mi’kmaq access to the natural resources that had long sustained them along the regions’ coasts and in the woods.

Reid asserts that the Mi'kmaq military power only began to wane in the region when the New England Planters and United Empire Loyalists began to arrive in Mi'kma'ki in greater numbers, economic, environmental and cultural pressures were put on the Mi'kmaq with the erosion of the intent of the treaties. According to Reid, Mi'kmaq tried to enforce the treaties through the threat of force as some did in the American Revolution at the Miramichi. In contrast, Tod Scott among others have argued that the Mi'kmaq were only able to keep the British "holed up" in their forts until the French were defeated in the region and the Mi'kmaq no longer had a supply of arms (1758). The Supreme Court of Canada also stated in R v Marshall that "the British feared the possibility of a renewed military alliance between the Mi’kmaq and the French as late as 1793."

Those who assert Mi'kmaq sovereignty rely in part on the evidence of the Treaty of Watertown. Again, the Americans made the treaty to draw Mi'kmaq support away from the British during the American Revolution. The Mi'kmaq signed the Treaty of Watertown with the new United States of America. The Treaty acknowledged the Mi'kmaq ability to continue trade. The Treaty was part of the basis for neutral position taken by the Mi'kmaq during the War of 1812 and why Mi'kmaq took marooned American sailors back to the US without ransom. There has never been a formal objection by Britain or Canada to this treaty or situation.

As Mi'kmaq military power waned at the beginning of the 19th century, as some historians have argued, rather than interpreting the Mi'kmaq treaty demands as demands to be treated like full British subjects, Reid asserts the Mi'kmaq treaty demands were about expecting the British to give presents for the Mi'kmaq accommodating them on their land. The British responded by giving presents and educational opportunities, which Reid interprets as further subjugation.

== See also ==
- Treaty Day (Nova Scotia)
- List of treaties
