= Gabriel Sylliboy =

Mi'kmaq Grand Chief (1874–1964)

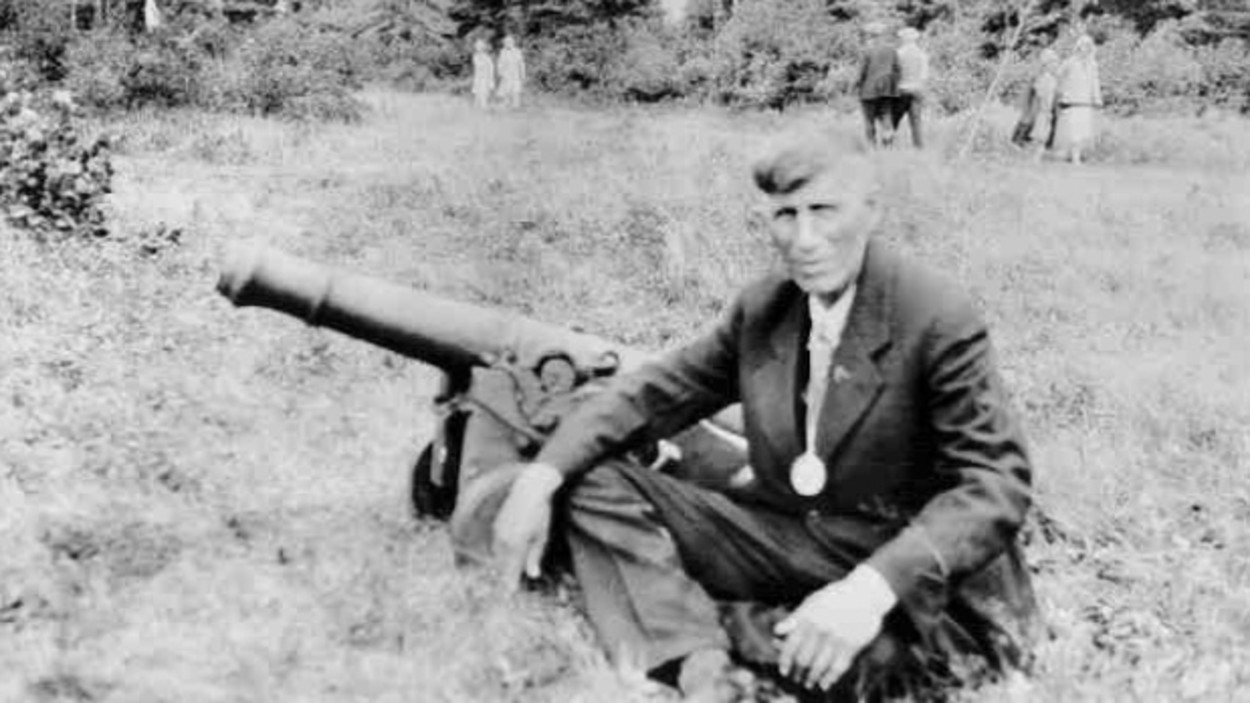
- At Nova Scotia, 1930s

Mi'kmaq of First Nations leader

Personal details
- Born: 18 August 1874 Whycocomagh reserve on Cape Breton, Canada
- Died: March 4, 1964 (aged 89) Sydney, Cape Breton County, Canada
- Relations: Norman Sylliboy (grandson)
- Mother tongue: Mi'kmaq

Gabriel Sylliboy (18 August 1874 – March 4, 1964) was the first Mi'kmaq elected as Grand Chief (1919) and the first to fight for the recognition by the state of Canada of the treaties between the government and the First Nations people.

== Early life ==
Sylliboy was born at the Whycocomagh reserve on Cape Breton, Canada, on 8 August 1874. His parents were John and Mary Sylliboy, née Barrington.

== Activism ==
Before 1918, Gabriel was already a renowned Mi'kmaw religious leader at the Whycocomagh Reserve and Grand Captain of Mi'kmawey Mawio'mi or the Mi'kmaq Grand Council. After Chief John Denny Jr. in 1918, Sylliboy became the first elected Grand Chief.

Ten years later, in 1929, Sylliboy after being found carrying muskrat pelts, was arrested for hunting out of season and convicted. He invoked treaty rights dating to 1752 as his defense during the court case and subsequent appeal, both of which he lost.

== Death ==
Sylliboy died on 4 March 1964, in Sydney, Cape Breton County. During his life, he could not speak, read, or write English. He insisted that his grandchildren be formally educated in English, while at the same time remain immersed in the Mi'kmaq culture and language.

== Legacy ==
In 1986, the Supreme Court of Canada overturned the decision in Mr. Sylliboy's case. In the case of Simon vs. The Queen, the Court found that the appellant, James Simon of Nova Scotia, a registered Mi'kmaq, had the right to hunt for food. Simon had relied for his defense on the same Peace and Friendship Treaty as Sylliboy. Chief Justice Brian Dickson wrote that "the language used [in the Sylliboy case] reflects the biases and prejudice of another era in [Canada's] history. Such language is no longer acceptable."

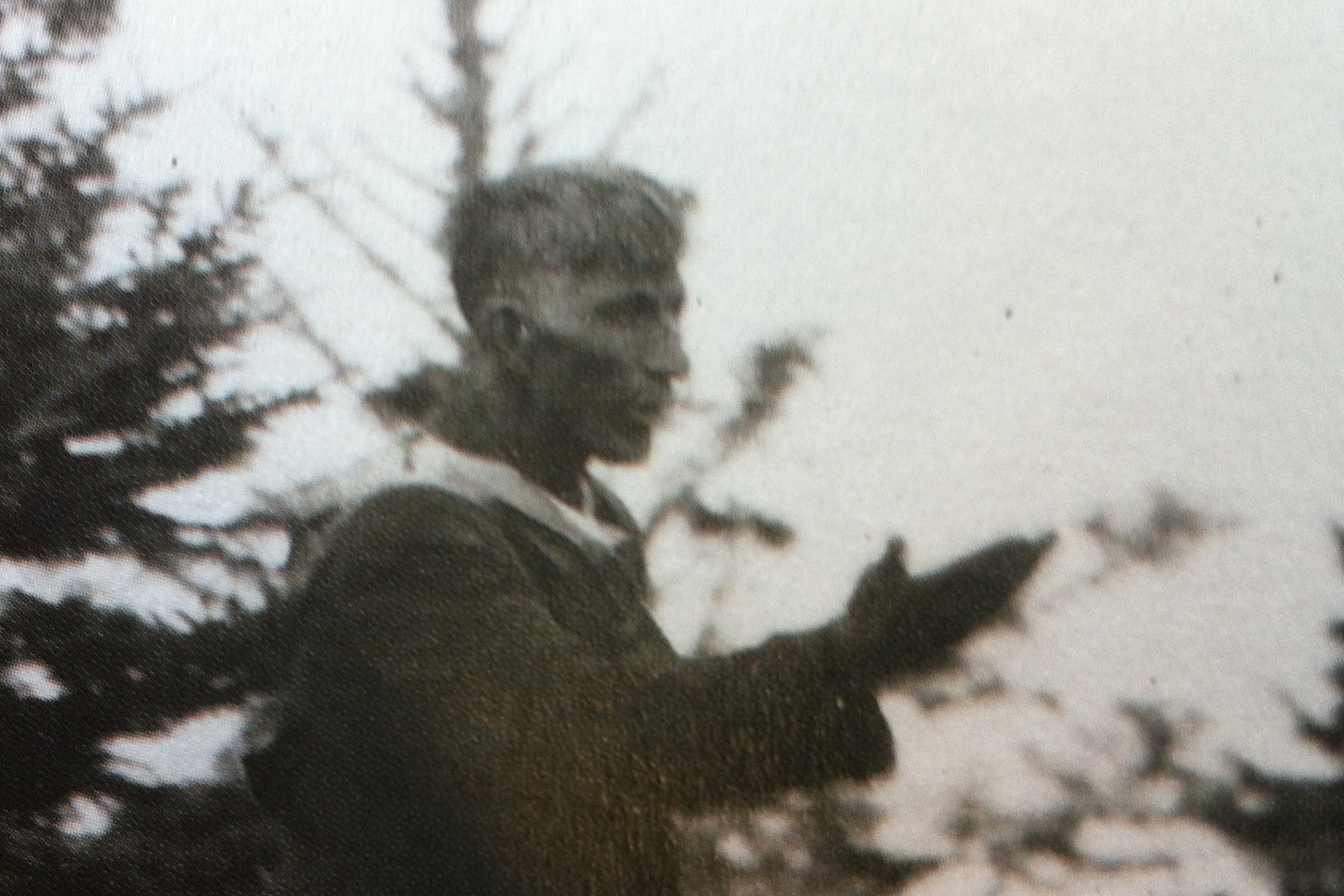
Chief Gabriel Sylliboy, speaking to Mi'kmaq people, c. 1930

Fourteen years later, in 1999, the R v Marshall ruling stated that the treaties from 1760 and 1761 show the Mi'kmaq can earn a living from hunting and fishing as their ancestors did when they traded with the Europeans. It was a case brought on by Donald Marshall Jr., wrongfully convicted of murder in the early 1970s and himself the son of a Mi’kmaq grand chief.

In February 2017, the Lieutenant Governor of Nova Scotia, J.J. Grant, granted a posthumous pardon to Gabriel Sylliboy, declaring that this "helps acknowledge the struggles of the past and honour those who sought to exercise their rights." He added that it "is a process of treaty education that includes understanding and valuing what the Mi’kmaq have contributed in shaping this province and nation." On 16 February 2017, the Office of the Premier of Nova Scotia issued an official apology and pardon statement:

We recognize that the treatment of the grand chief was unjust. The province apologizes to the family of Grand Chief Sylliboy and the Mi'kmaw community for this injustice. An important step on our path toward reconciliation is recognizing the mistakes of the past so we can build a better future for all Nova Scotians.

Grand Chief Ben Sylliboy of the Mi’kmaq Grand Council stated that the fact that the "Mi’kmaq [people] today celebrate their aboriginal and treaty rights is due to people like the heroic late grand chief."

== See also ==
- Treaty Day
- History of Nova Scotia
- List of grand chiefs (Mi'kmaq)
