= Truckhouse =

Trading post in colonial North America

A truckhouse or truck-house was a type of trading post established by legislation in the colonies of British America to regulate the North American fur trade. Truckhouses were maintained in the early to mid-18th century.

Truckhouses in the province of Massachusetts Bay held a monopoly on trade with Indigenous peoples along the Nashua, Merrimack, and Piscataqua rivers. Leach argues that truckhouses "completely dominated" trade in the eastern colonies between 1726 and the 1740s, when King George's War erupted. Despite its dominance, however, the system did not generally turn a profit. Truckhouses sold goods to Indigenous buyers at low prices. The aim of the truckhouse system was to disrupt French diplomatic influence in the area, not primarily to supplement government revenue. It also served as a means of regulating settlers' trade with Indigenous peoples.

The Massachusetts General Court, legislature of the province of Massachusetts Bay, established truckhouses by statute in 1699. An earlier statute creating truckhouses had been passed in 1694, but the system was disrupted when King William's War—in which many Indigenous groups sided with the French—broke out. The 1699 statute was reenacted every year until 1703. A later statute, passed in 1726, used the truckhouse system to implement terms of the Treaty of Falmouth which followed Dummer's War. The 1726 statute continued until 1731, when a new statute was passed that prescribed trade with Indigenous peoples "at such easy rates and prices as may oblige them to a firm adherence to His Majesty's interest". The 1731 statute continued, with modifications, until 1742.

During the American Revolutionary War, there were truckhouses on the Saint John, Penobscot, and Machias rivers. The Saint John truckhouse was destroyed by the British in 1777. Another truckhouse on the Kennebec was closed before the war ended.

Truckhouse officials, known as truckmasters, included: Samuel Moody (1675–1747), a minister; Joseph Heath, a military official; Joseph Kellogg (1691–1756), a militiaman and trader; Thomas Smith, an Indian agent and father of a cleric of the same name; John Noyes; and Jabez Bradbury, a militiaman.

The province of Pennsylvania passed a truckhouse statute in 1758 which was based on the Massachusetts law. The Halifax Treaties, concluded in 1760–1 between the Miꞌkmaq and the British Crown, included provisions establishing truckhouses in Nova Scotia.

== See also ==
- R v Marshall, a 1999 court case concerning a treaty where truckhouses are discussed

== Sources ==
- Leach, Douglas Edward (1966). The Northern Colonial Frontier, 1607–1763. New York: Holt, Rinehart and Winston. OCLC 1036800156.
- Leamon, James S. (1993). Revolution Downeast: The War for American Independence in Maine. Amherst, Massachusetts: University of Massachusetts Press. ISBN 978-0-585-15510-4. OCLC 1151155432.
- MacFarlane, Ronald Oliver (March 1938). "The Massachusetts Bay Truck-Houses in Diplomacy with the Indians". The New England Quarterly. 11 (1): 48–65. doi:10.2307/360560. JSTOR 360560.
- Patterson, Stephen E. (1993). "Indian-White Relations in Nova Scotia, 1749–61: A Study in Political Interaction". Acadiensis. 23 (1): 23–59. JSTOR 30303469.
