= Treaty Day (Nova Scotia) =

Holiday in Nova Scotia, Canada

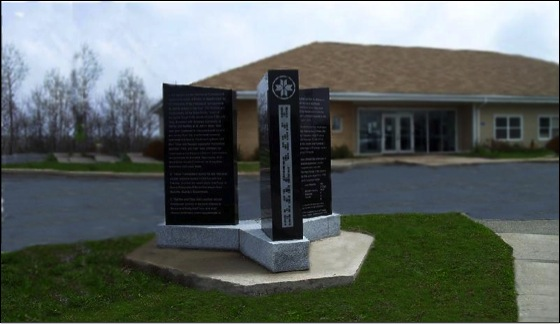
Monument to the Treaty of 1752, Shubenacadie First Nation, Nova Scotia

Treaty Day (Mi'kmaq: Ankukamkewey Na'kwek) is celebrated by Nova Scotians annually on October 1 in recognition of the Treaties signed between the British Empire and the Mi'kmaq people. The first treaty was signed in 1725 after Father Rale's War. The final Halifax Treaties of 1760–61, marked the end of 75 years of regular warfare between the Mi'kmaq and the British (see the four French and Indian Wars as well as Father Rale's War and Father Le Loutre's War). The treaty making process of 1760–61, ended with the Halifax Treaties (1760–61).

The treaties were only formally recognized by the Supreme Court of Canada once they were enshrined in the Canadian Constitution in 1982. The first Treaty Day occurred in 1986, the year after the Supreme Court upheld the Treaty of 1752 established by Edward Cornwallis and signed by Jean-Baptiste Cope and Governor Peregrine Hopson. Cornwallis was present for the signing at Cope's request. Since that time there have been numerous judicial decisions that have upheld the other treaties in the Supreme Court, the most recognized being the Donald Marshall case.

The day October 1 was chosen because the Treaty of 1752 designated October 1 as the date on which the Mi’kmaw people would receive gifts from the Crown to "renew their friendship and submissions." The purpose of Treaty Day is also to promote public awareness about the Mi’kmaw culture and heritage for all citizens of Nova Scotia. Treaty Day marks the beginning of Mi'kmaq History Month.

== History of Treaties ==
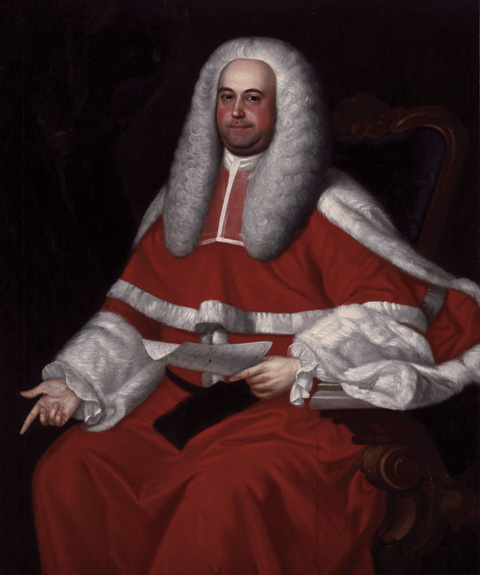
Governor of Nova Scotia Jonathan Belcher with the Nova Scotia Council negotiated treaties of 1760–61

Historian Stephen Patterson indicates that the Halifax Treaties established a lasting peace on the basis that the MI'kmaq surrendered and chose to uphold the rule of law through the British courts rather than resorting to violence. Patterson reports that the Mi'kmaq were not in a position of military strength after the defeat of the French. He argues that without a supply of guns and ammunition, the Mi'kmaq lost their ability to fight and to hunt for food. As a result, the British were able to define themselves the terms of the Treaties. Patterson identifies the Halifax Treaties define the relationship between the Mi'kmaq and the British. While the Treaties do not stipulate the laws governing land and resources, the treaties ensured that both parties would follow the laws that would eventually be made to deal with these matters and any other matters. The British, accepted a continuing role for existing Mi'kmaw polities within the limits of British sovereignty.

In contrast, according to historian John G. Reid, the Mi'kmaq were able to negotiate Halifax Treaties because they continued to have significant military strength in the region even after the defeat of the French. As a result of this conclusion, Reid dismisses the text of the Treaties which demand Mi'kmaw "submission" to the British crown. Instead, Reid states that the treaties infer a friendly and reciprocal relationship was the real intent. The Mi'kmaw leaders who came initially to Halifax in 1760 had clear goals that centred on the making of peace, the establishment of a secure and well-regulated trade in commodities such as furs, and an ongoing friendship with the British crown. In return, they offered their own friendship and a tolerance of limited British settlement, although without any formal land surrender. To fulfill the friendly and reciprocal intent of the treaties, Ried argues that further British settlement of land would need to be negotiated and, in exchange for accommodating the existing British settlements, presents would be given to the Mi'kmaq. According to historian Geoffrey Plank, the documents summarizing the peace agreements did not indicate the laws regulating land ownership and land usage, but they assured the Mi’kmaq access to the natural resources that had long sustained them along the regions’ coasts and in the woods.

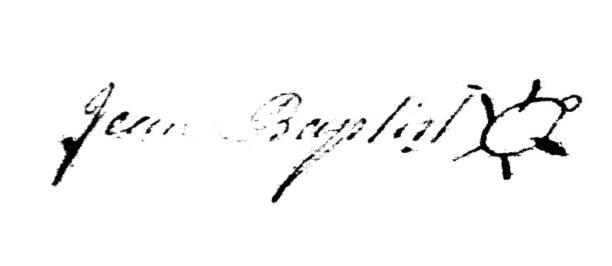
Signature of Jean-Baptiste Cope (Beaver), Treaty of 1725

Reid asserts that the Mi'kmaw military power only began to wane in the region when the New England Planters and United Empire Loyalists began to arrive in Mi'kma'ki in greater numbers, economic, environmental and cultural pressures were put in the Mi'kmaq with the erosion of the intent of the treaties. According to Reid, Mi'kmaq tried to enforce the treaties through threat of force as some did in the American Revolution at the Miramichi.

As their military power waned in the beginning of the nineteenth century, rather than interpreting the Mi'kmaw treaty demands as demands to be treated like full British subjects, Reid asserts the Mi'kmaw treaty demands were about expecting the British to give presents for the Mi'kmaq accommodating them on their land. The British responded by giving presents and educational opportunities, which Reid interprets as further subjugation.

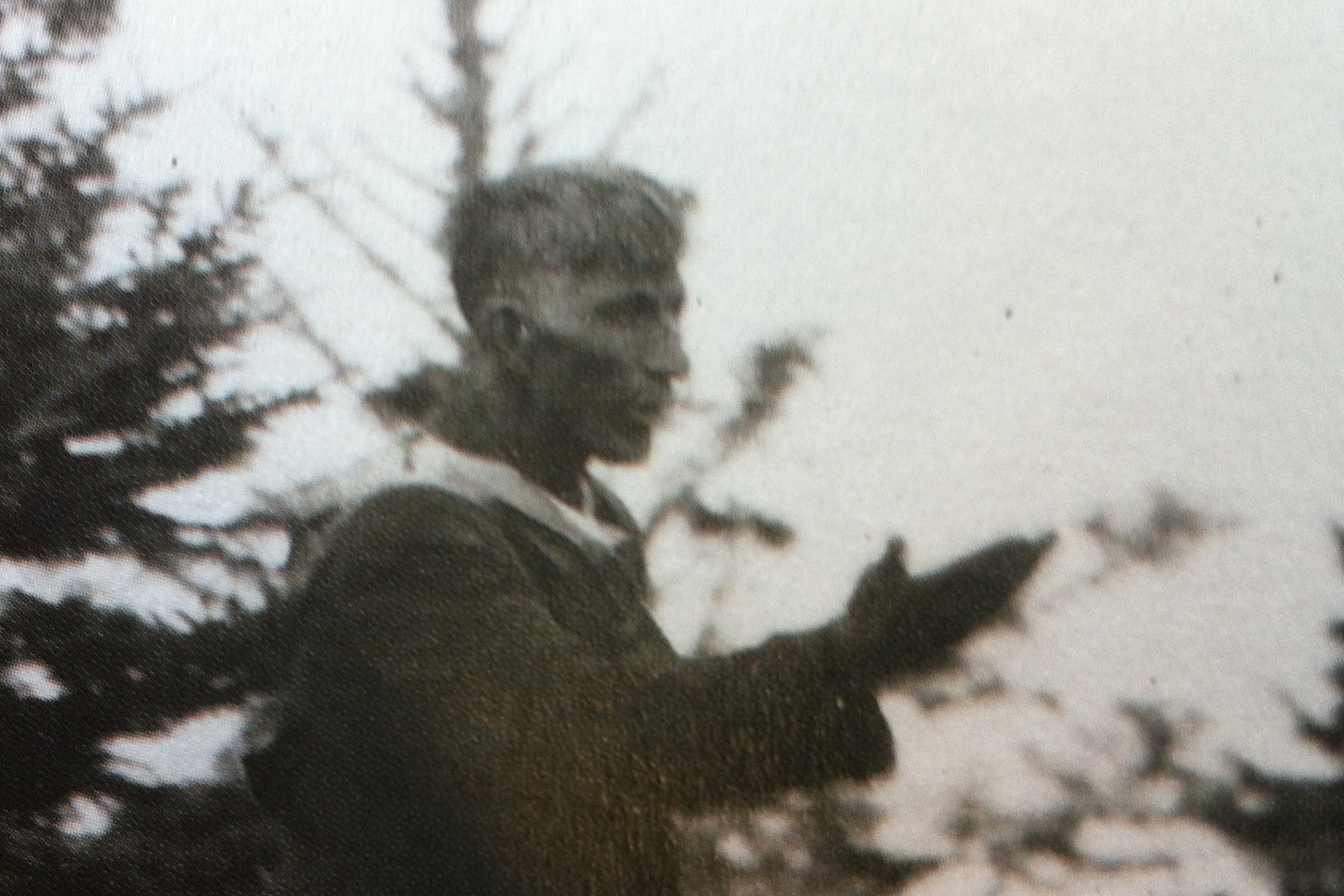
Chief Gabriel Sylliboy – first to fight for Treaty Rights in the Supreme Court of Nova Scotia, 1929

Gabriel Sylliboy was the first Mi'kmaq elected as Grand Chief (1919) and the first to fight for treaty recognition – specifically, the Treaty of 1752 – in the Supreme Court of Nova Scotia (1929).

The Treaties did not gain legal status until they were enshrined into the Canadian Constitution in 1982. R. v. Simon (1985) overruled R. v. Syliboy (1929) which had held that aboriginal peoples had no capacity to enter into treaties, and thus that the Numbered Treaties were void. A variety of non-land rights cases, anchored on the Constitution Act 1982, have also been influential.

Every October 1, "Treaty Day" is now celebrated by Nova Scotians.

== See also ==
- Military history of Nova Scotia
- Military history of the Mi’kmaq People
- National Aboriginal Day
- Treaty of Portsmouth (1713)
- Treaty of Casco (1678)
- Treaty of 1752
- Treaty of Watertown
- Burying the Hatchet ceremony (Nova Scotia)
- Aboriginal title
