= National Indigenous Peoples Day =

Day recognizing First Nations of Canada

National Indigenous People's Day
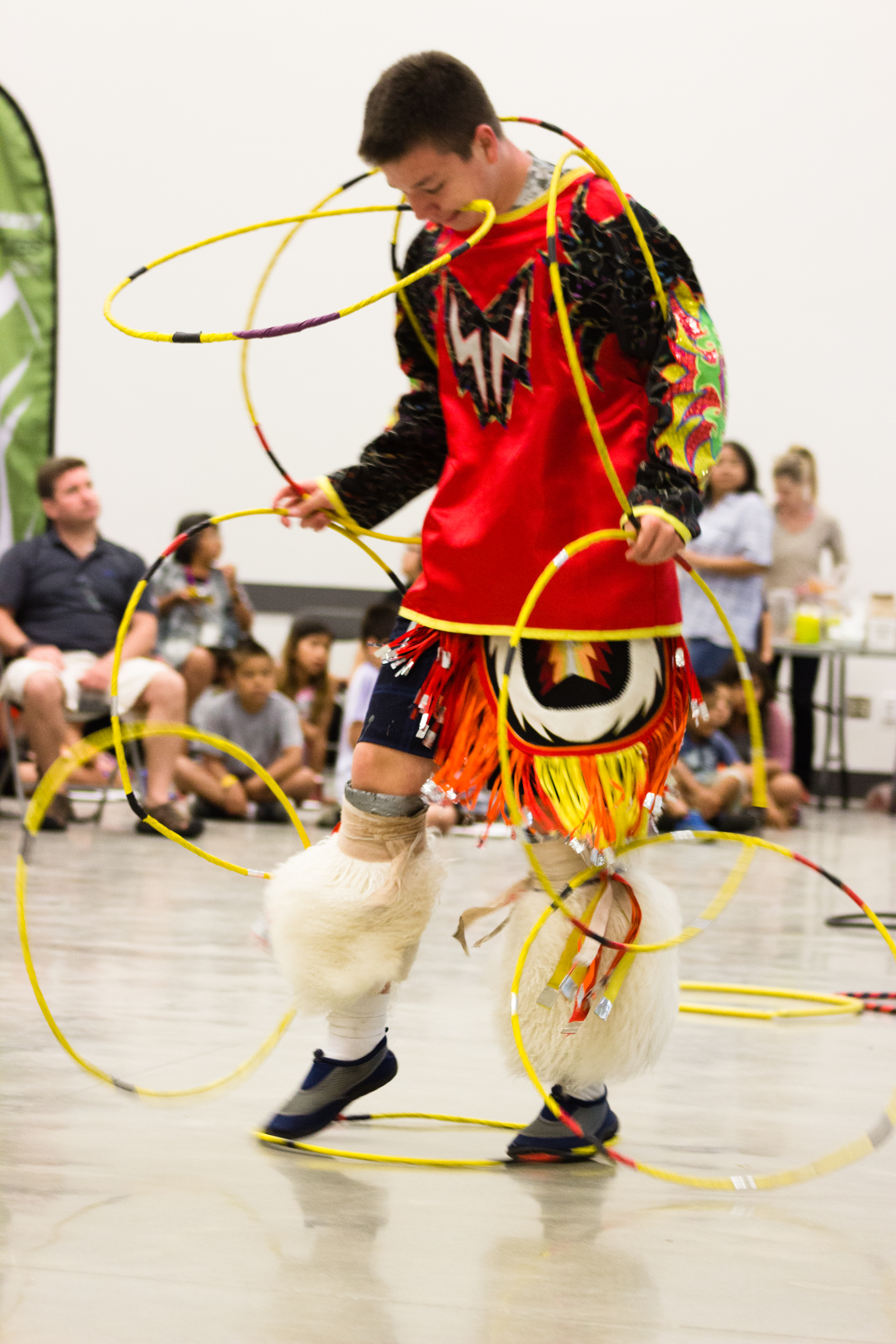
- National Aboriginal Day celebrations at University of the Fraser Valley, 2015
- Observed by: Canada
- Date: 21 June
- Next time: 21 June 2027
- Frequency: annual

National Indigenous Peoples Day (French: Journée Nationale des Peuples Autochtones; formerly National Aboriginal Day) is a day recognizing and celebrating the cultures and contributions of the First Nations, Inuit, and Métis Indigenous peoples of Canada.

The day was first celebrated in 1996, after it was proclaimed that year by then Governor General of Canada Roméo LeBlanc, to be celebrated annually on 21 June. This date was chosen as the statutory holiday for many reasons, including its cultural significance as the Summer solstice, and the fact that it is a day on which many Indigenous peoples and communities traditionally celebrate their heritage. A proposal to rename the day National Indigenous Peoples Day was made in 2017. The bill to make that change (C-369) was still being debated by parliament when the legislature was dissolved. The federal Crown has begun referring to the day as National Indigenous Peoples Day, regardless.

This day has been celebrated as a statutory territorial holiday in the Northwest Territories since 2001 and in Yukon since 2017. It is not however, currently considered a statutory holiday across the rest of the country.

== History ==
The day came about after a series of calls for such a celebration.

It was first self-declared Indian Day in 1945, by Jules Sioui and chiefs from across North America.

In 1982, the National Indian Brotherhood (now the Assembly of First Nations) called for the creation of a National Aboriginal Solidarity Day to be celebrated on 21 June. In 1990, Quebec became the first province or territory to establish the day as a celebration of Indigenous culture.

In 1995, a national conference of Indigenous and non-Indigenous people chaired by Elijah Harper, titled The Sacred Assembly, called for a national holiday to celebrate the contributions of Aboriginal peoples to Canada. In 1996, the Royal Commission on Aboriginal Peoples recommended that a National First Peoples Day be officially recognized. 21 June was chosen as the date because it often coincides with the summer solstice, a time when many Indigenous groups celebrate their culture.

In 2001, members of the 14th Legislative Assembly passed the National Aboriginal Day Act making the Northwest Territories the first jurisdiction in Canada to recognize this day as a formal statutory holiday. In 2009, the House of Commons declared June to be National Aboriginal History Month (now National Indigenous History Month).

On 21 June 2017, Canadian Prime Minister Justin Trudeau released a statement pledging to rename the event National Indigenous Peoples Day. Assembly of First Nations National Chief Perry Bellegarde supported the proposed change, called it an "important step", citing the terminology used in the landmark United Nations' Declaration on the Rights of Indigenous Peoples." The private member's bill that would have effected the change in name (Bill C-369) reached first reading in the Senate, but died on the order paper when parliament was dissolved on 11 September 2019. The federal Crown still began using the name National Indigenous People's Day in publications.

In recent years, the Aboriginal Peoples Television Network has broadcast an annual cultural gala, Indigenous Day Live, on National Indigenous Peoples Day.

== See also ==
- Treaty Day (Nova Scotia)
- International Day of the World's Indigenous Peoples
