= List of grand chiefs (Mi'kmaq) =

The following Mi'kmaq grand chiefs have presided over the Mi'kmaq Grand Council, the traditional political structure of the Mi'kmaw in Atlantic Canada. Each of the seven Districts of Mi’kma’ki had a District Chief who was elected from the local chiefs from that district. One of the district chiefs was appointed Grand Chief. The Grand Council was reorganized in the 18th century in response to the collapse of French power in the region. Previously the Miꞌkmaq had operated in 14-15 independent bands in Miꞌkmaꞌki.

#	Image	Name	Grand Chief from	Grand Chief until
1.		Henri Membertou	1550	1611
2.		Louis Membertou	1611	1681
3.		Jean Neminaour/Nemilaour	1681	1726
4.		Jean Baptiste Cope	1726	1759
5.		Tomah Denys	1759	1792
6.		Francis Peck	1792	1818
7.		Michael Tooma	1818	1842
8.		Frank Tooma Jr.	1842	1869
9.		John Denny	1869	1887
10. (CONTENDED)		Jacques-Pierre Peminuit Paul	1856	1895
10.(CONTENDED)		John Denny Jr.	1887	1918
11.		Gabriel Sylliboy	1918	1964
12.		Donald Marshall Sr.	1964	1991
13.		Benjamin Sylliboy	1991	2017
14.		Norman Sylliboy	2019	Present
