= Peregrine Hopson =

British Army general (1696–1759)

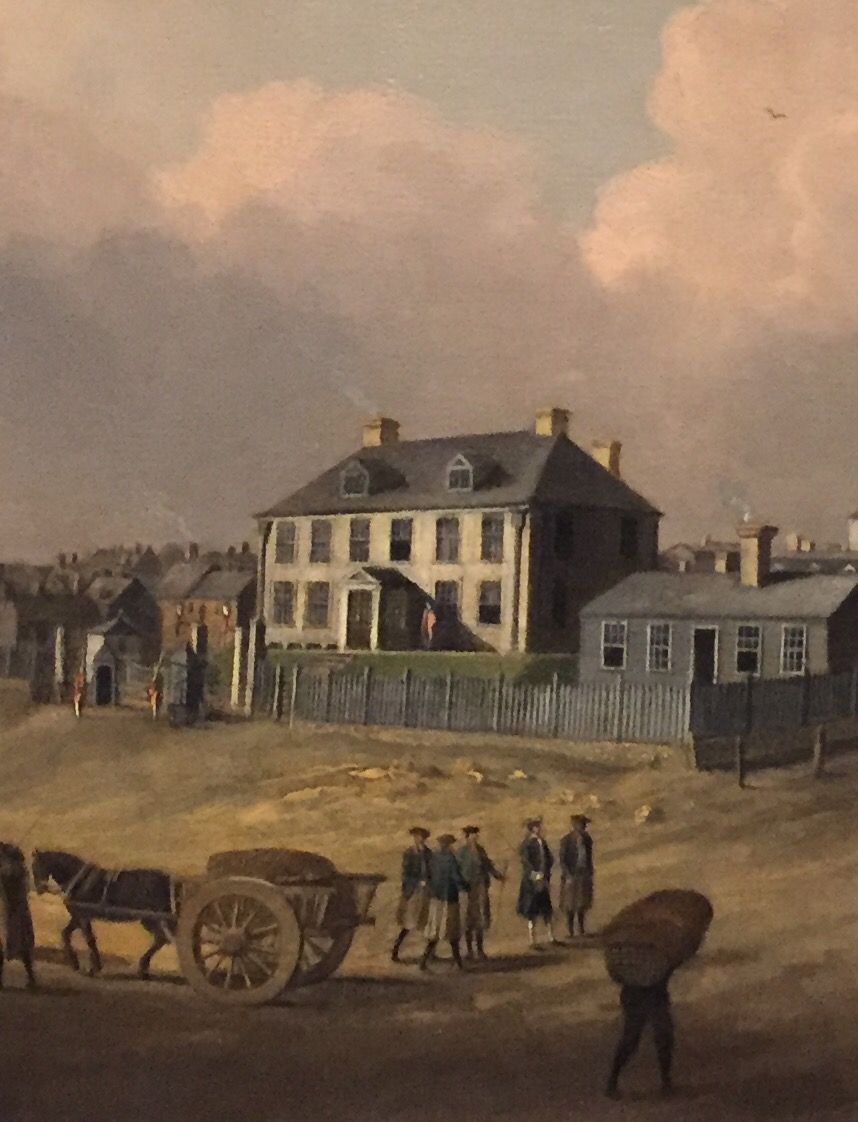
Governor Hopson's residence (built 1749). (Located on the site of Province House, which still is furnished with his Nova Scotia Council table)

Peregrine Thomas Hopson (5 June 1696 – 27 February 1759) was a British Army officer who commanded the 40th Regiment of Foot and saw extensive service during the eighteenth century and rose to the rank of Major General. He also served as British commander in Louisbourg during the British occupation between 1746 and 1749, then became Governor of Nova Scotia and later led a major expedition to the West Indies during the Seven Years' War during which he died.

Hopson is perhaps best known for creating and signing the Peace Treaty of 1752 with Mi'kmaq chief, Jean-Baptiste Cope which is celebrated (along with other treaties) every year by Nova Scotians on Treaty Day.

== Early career ==
Hopson was born on 5 June 1696, the second son of vice admiral Sir Thomas Hopsonn and Elizabeth Timbrell. He initially joined the Royal Marines in 1703, but later transferred to join the British Army. He rose his way up to lieutenant colonel by 1743, serving mainly in Gibraltar.

== Louisbourg (1746-49) ==
Following Colonel Hugh Warburton, in the Spring of 1746 Hopson arrived in Louisbourg, Nova Scotia with a number of reinforcements intending to relieve the existing British garrison. The settlement had only been captured from the French the previous year. From 1747 until 1749 he served as commander of the town, until it was handed back as part of the Treaty of Aix-la-Chapelle. On 12 July 1749 he formally handed over the town to the returning French troops.

== Governor of Nova Scotia ==
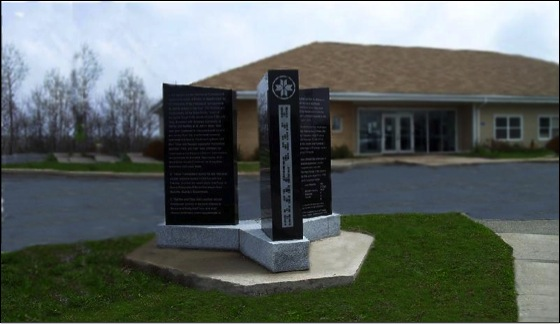
Monument to the Treaty of 1752, Shubenacadie First Nation, Nova Scotia

During Father Le Loutre's War, Hopson served as Governor of Nova Scotia (1752–1754) from the British capital of Halifax. While combating the Mi'kmaq and Acadian raids, he maintained relatively good relations with the French at Louisbourg and Quebec. Hopson created the Treaty of 1752, which was signed by Jean-Baptiste Cope, on behalf of his Mi'Kmaq tribe. Hopson then sent the delegation that ended in the Attack at Isle Madame, which led to Cope destroying the treaty.

== Seven Years' War ==
=== Canada ===
Once a fresh war broke out with France in 1756, Hopson returned to Halifax and helped organise the British response to the threat of a French attack. He also played a role in the Great Upheaval of French-speaking inhabitants of Nova Scotia before returning home to Britain. He was passed over for a role in the large British attempt to capture Louisbourg in 1758.

=== West Indies ===
Instead he was appointed to command a major expedition to the West Indies. The campaign was a central part of William Pitt's strategy to win the war, by seizing profitable French colonies in the Caribbean. Hopson's choice was particularly favoured by George II, while opposed by Pitt who insisted on appointing one of his own protégés John Barrington as second-in-command.

Hopson sailed from Portsmouth in 1758 with 9,000 troops. Once in the West Indies the British set up Barbados as a base to strike out against the two main French targets Martinique and Guadeloupe. However the British attempt to capture Martinique ended in failure, with heavy casualties and growing rates of disease and the British were forced to switch their attentions to Guadeloupe. As they attempted to capture the island, the British were hit by a wave of diseases, and 1,500 men swiftly fell ill. Hopson also contracted a tropical disease and died in February 1759 in Basse-Terre. His force fell under the command of Barrington, who successfully completed the capture of Guadeloupe two months later.

== Bibliography ==
- Anderson, Fred. Crucible of War: Faber and Faber, 2000
- McLynn, Frank. 1759: The Year Britain Became Master of the World. Pimlico, 2005

Military offices
Preceded by Sir Charles Knowles	Governor of Louisbourg; 1747–1748	Île-Royale returned to French governor Charles des Herbiers de La Ralière
Preceded by Francis Fuller	Colonel of the Hopson's Regiment of Foot; 1748–1752	Succeeded by Hon. George Boscawen
Preceded by Hon. Edward Cornwallis	Colonel of the 40th Regiment of Foot; 1752–1759	Succeeded by Hon. John Barrington
Political offices
Preceded by Edward Cornwallis	Governor of Nova Scotia; 1752–1754	Succeeded by Charles Lawrence
