= Treaty of Watertown =

1776 treaty between the United States and Mi'kmaw

The Treaty of Watertown was the first foreign treaty concluded by the United States of America after the adoption of the Declaration of Independence. It was signed on July 19, 1776, in the Edmund Fowle House in the town of Watertown, Massachusetts Bay and it established a military alliance between the United States and the St. John's and some of the Mi'kmaw bands against Great Britain for the early years of the American Revolutionary War. Seven Mi'kmaw bands chose to decline the American treaty. The Mi’kmaq People were in praxis with three virtues that are the supremacy of the Great Spirit, respect for Mother Earth, and people power that were based on their cultural ways of life before contact with early European settlers.

While the youthful nation of the United States was seeking more manpower for the fight against the British rule. The collective fight would decrease the British monarchy’s authority, invoke a new sovereignty of leadership with democracy, and make relations with the Mi’kmaq and the First Nations of neighboring Canada.

Three years later, on 7 June 1779, the Mi'kmaq "delivered up" the Watertown treaty to Nova Scotia Governor Michael Francklin and re-established all the Mi'kmaw bands loyalty to the British. After the British resounding victory over the American Penobscot Expedition, according to Mi'kmaw historian Daniel Paul, Mi'kmaq in present-day New Brunswick renounced the Watertown treaty and signed a treaty of alliance with British on 24 September 1779.

== Terms ==
The treaty was signed by the Provincial Council of Massachusetts Bay (then a colony in rebellion, not yet a State, which it would become with the signing of the Treaty of Watertown 1776), "in behalf of said State, and the other united States of America," A copy of the newly signed Declaration of Independence was delivered by courier to the treaty conference at the Meeting House in Watertown, where it was read to the Wabanaki representatives before it was proclaimed from the balcony of the Old State House in nearby Boston. After the Declaration had been translated, the Indigenous delegates said, "We like it well." The preamble of the treaty quotes verbatim from the conclusion of the Declaration of Independence, asserting for the thirteen colonies "that as Free and Independent States they have full power to levy War, conclude Peace, contract Alliances, establish Commerce, and to do all other Acts & Things which Independent States may of Right do."

Under the terms of the treaty, the Mi'kmaq and St. John's Tribes (Maliseet and Passamaquoddy) committed to "supply and furnish 600 strong men...or as many as may be" for service in the Continental Army. (600 Indigenous fighters from the Wabanaki confederacy was a significant reduction from the 1200 fighters estimated to be available during the French and Indian War. There were 5000 British troops in Nova Scotia by 1778.) Mi’kmaq People had a vast knowledge of their traditional homelands. Their battle tactics were practiced with fearlessness and a duty of dedication was demonstrated on the forefront as they left their homelands, families, and cultural responsibilities to serve. Although the Treaty of Watertown was based on friendship for the early colonist state of Massachusetts Bay and the neighboring Indians but the value payment of services was not disclosed in article eight of the treaty.

Three of the six Mi'kmaq delegates who signed the treaty "manfully and generously" volunteered to enlist immediately. The treaty also notes that their pay would commence upon their arrival at Washington's camp in New York. Tribal forces formed an "American Battalion" in the Battle of Fort Cumberland (November 22 – December 28, 1776). They also protected the Maine border and launched other attacks against British installations. Since 1995, the town of Watertown, Massachusetts has held an annual Treaty Day celebration.

Mi'kmaw historian Daniel N. Paul notes many individual Mi'kmaq did indeed volunteer and serve with the Continental army as per the terms of the Treaty. However the Signators who signed on were representing only their bands; its part of Mi'kmaq Treaty protocol that each bands was Sovereign and could sign Nation to Nation agreements; then they would return home to present the agreements to the Grand Council, the Council of Women, and finally to all citizens, which if consensus occurred, the newly signed Treaty would be ratified District by District. The Watertown Treaty was never fully ratified by all Mi'kmaq bands until modern times. Following the original signing of the Treaty, it was ratified by all the bands of the Maliseets in a plebiscite.

== Modern Treaty Reference ==
The Treaty of Watertown is still honored today: all Mi'kmaq are allowed to join the US Armed Forces, regardless of the Nation of their birth. These warriors who have gone to Iraq and Afghanistan, and many other places around the world are celebrated.

The traditional names of the Wabanaki are the People of the Dawn Land or the People of the Dawn. Their homelands are located in the northeast region of the United States in Maine and they have federal recognition status with the U.S. government.

The Treaty of Watertown is still being referenced as the first treaty with an Indigenous tribe and the First Nations between the United States during the Revolutionary War.

== See also ==
- List of treaties
- Timeline of United States diplomatic history
- Treaty Day (Nova Scotia)
- Military history of the Mi’kmaq People
- Nova Scotia in the American Revolution

== Sources ==
- Paul, Daniel N. (2006). We Were Not the Savages: Collision Between European and Native American Civilizations (3rd ed.). Fernwood. pp. 180–185. ISBN 978-1-55266-209-0. (includes full text of both treaties).
- Christopher Groden & Gary Simon, "Alliance and Renewal". WatertownTreaty.org, retrieved January 2, 2006.
- Alex Denny (Mi'kmaq Grand Captain), Address to the Massachusetts House of Representatives, June 24, 1987. WatertownTreaty.org, retrieved January 2, 2006.
