= Treaty of Portsmouth (1713) =

1713 treaty

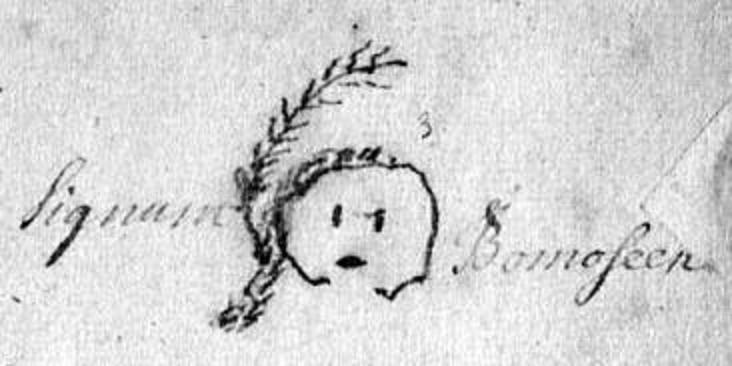
Pictograph signature of Bomoseen (or Bomazeen), Abenaki sachem

The Treaty of Portsmouth, signed on July 13, 1713, ended hostilities between the Eastern Abenakis, a Native American tribe and First Nation and Algonquian-speaking people, with the British provinces of Massachusetts Bay and New Hampshire. The agreement renewed a treaty of 1693 the natives had made with Governor Sir William Phips, two in a series of attempts to establish peace between the Wabanaki Confederacy and colonists after Queen Anne's War.

== Queen Anne's War ==
During the War of the Spanish Succession, France began a conflict with England which would elongate to their colonies. Called Queen Anne's War in the New World, New France openly fought New England for domination of the region between them, with the French enlisting the indigenous Abenaki tribes as allies. Occasionally under French command, First Nations people attacked numerous English settlements along the Maine coast, including Casco (now Portland), Scarborough, Saco, Wells, York and Berwick, in New Hampshire at Hampton, Dover, Oyster River Plantation (now Durham), and Exeter, and down into Massachusetts at Haverhill, Groton and Deerfield, site of the Deerfield Massacre. Houses were burned, and the inhabitants either killed or abducted to Canada. The Treaty of Utrecht in 1713, however, restored peace between France and England. As part of the agreement, Acadia fell under British sovereignty. When the First Nations People realised that they could no longer depend on the French for protection, the sachems sought a truce, and proposed a peace conference to be held at Casco. Joseph Dudley, governor of Massachusetts and New Hampshire, agreed to a conference, but chose instead to host it at Portsmouth, New Hampshire, which was protected by the guns of Fort William and Mary. For a more detailed timeline of events leading from first contact to the 1713 treaty, see references and resources.

== Articles of agreement ==
On July 11, 1713, Governor Dudley and various dignitaries from New Hampshire and Massachusetts Bay (which then included Maine) met with delegates from Abenaki tribes, including the Amasacontee, Maliseet, Norridgewock, Pennacook, Penobscot and Sokoki. The agreement was read aloud by sworn interpreters to the sachems, eight of whom on July 13 signed with totemic pictographs. Historians have found that New England politicians and translators engaged in a "policy of deception" the Wabanaki group of tribes. Consequently, Wabanakis would claim in subsequent years that several articles written into the treaty were at odds with verbal agreements, especially regarding British claims to sovereignty over them. Others would sign the following year after a similar interpretation at another convention. "Being sensible of our great offence and folly," the Indians agreed to:

- acknowledge themselves submissive, obedient subjects of Queen Anne
- cease all acts of hostility towards subjects of Great Britain and their estates
- allow English settlers to return to their former settlements without molestation or claims by the Indians
- trade only at English trading posts established, managed and regulated with governmental approval
- not come near English plantations or settlements below the Saco River, "to prevent mischiefs and inconveniences"
- address all grievances in an English court, rather than in "private revenge"
- confess that they had broken peace agreements made in 1693, 1699, 1702 and 1703, and now ask for forgiveness and mercy
- not make any "perfidious treaty or correspondence" [with the French] against the English; should any exist, to reveal it "seasonally"
- cast themselves upon Her Majesty for mercy and pardon for past rebellions, hostilities and violations of their promises
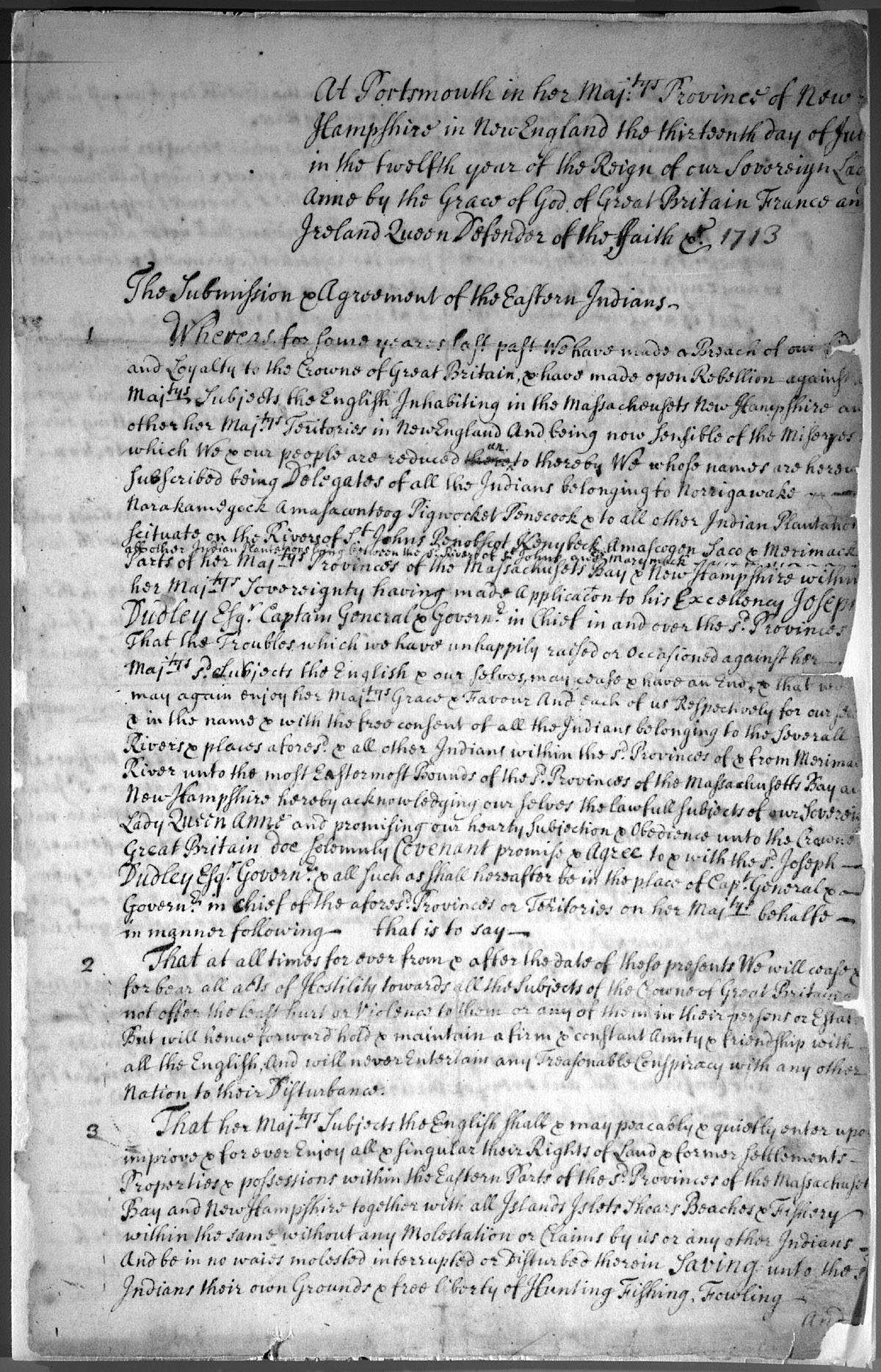
Page 1

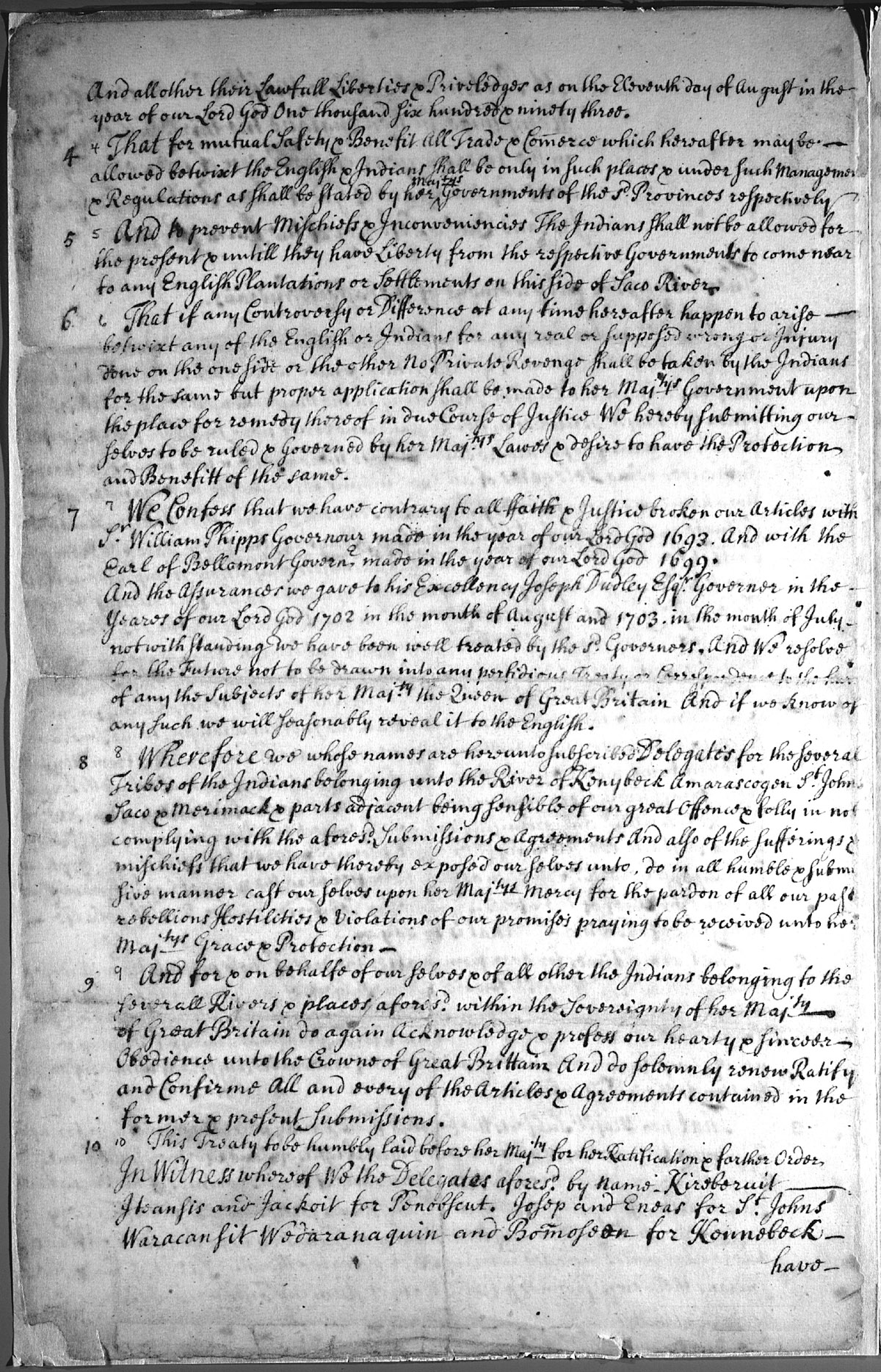
Page 2

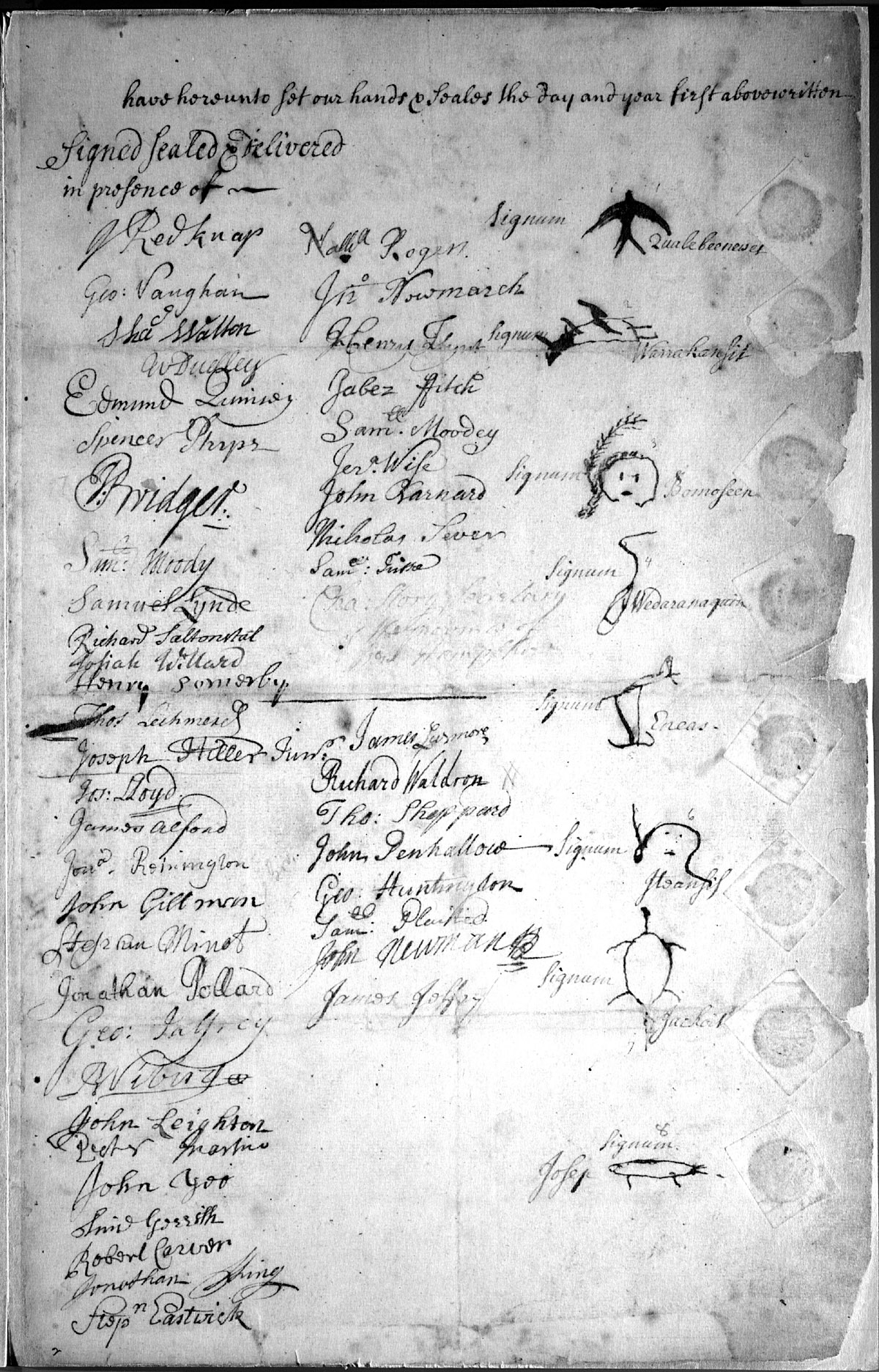
Page 3

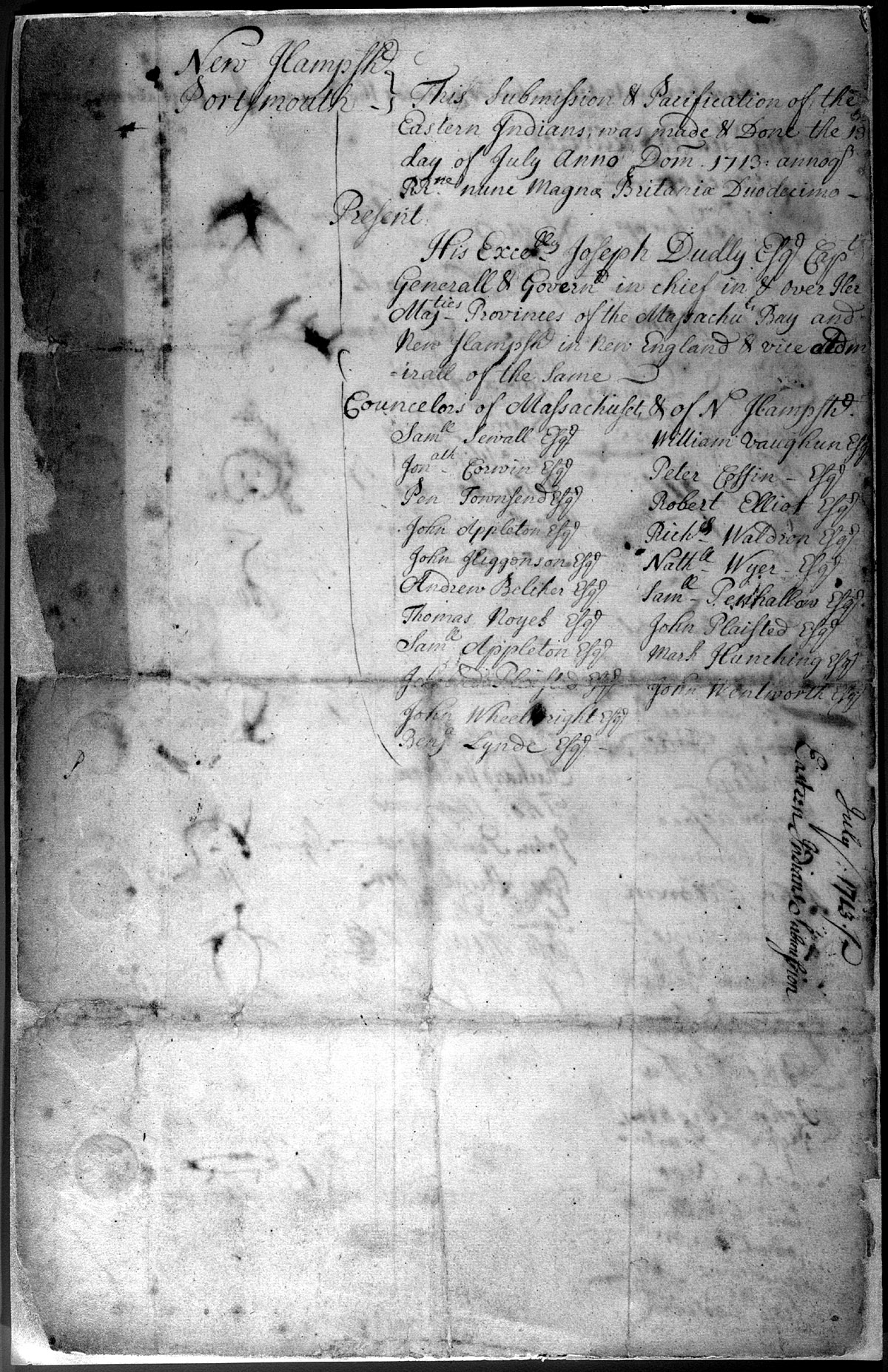
Page 4

At the signing of the Treaty of Portsmouth were also the St John River Maliseet [Wolastoqiyik], Mi'kmaw (Mi'kmaq), and Abenaki [Aln8bak] nations of Acadia.

== Aftermath ==
The English failed to fulfil their obligations under the treaty. Massachusetts did not, as promised, establish official trading posts selling cheap goods at honest prices to the First Nations. Tribes were forced to continue exchanging their furs with private traders, who were notorious for cheating them. In addition, First Nations regarded as threats the British blockhouses being built on their lands, and objected to ongoing encroachment of settlers on lands they claimed. Their discontent was encouraged by Sebastien Rale and other French Jesuit priests embedded with the tribes who promoted New France's interests. In response to what they perceived as British violations of the Treaty of Portsmouth, the Abenakis resumed raids on the encroaching British settlements. Consequently, on July 25, 1722, Governor Samuel Shute declared war against the Eastern First Nations in what would be called Father Rale's War. Boundary struggles between New France and New England would continue until the Treaty of Paris in 1763.

== See also ==
- List of treaties
- Treaty of Casco (1678)
- Military history of Nova Scotia
- Military history of the Mi’kmaq People
- Treaty Day
