= Donald Marshall Sr. =

Grand Chief of the Mi'kmaq (1925–1991)

- Born: 28 May 1925; Sydney, Nova Scotia, Canada
- Died: 25 August 1991 (aged 66); Sydney, Nova Scotia, Canada
- Known for: Grand Chief of the Mi'kmaq
- Spouse: Caroline Googoo
- Children: 13; including Donald Jr.

Donald Joseph Marshall Sr. (May 28, 1925 – August 25, 1991) was a Grand Chief of the Mi'kmaq who lived at Membertou First Nation near Sydney, Nova Scotia. He served as Grand Chief for 27 years, from 1964 until his death in 1991. His son, Donald Marshall Jr., was wrongly convicted of murder and rose to prominence again as the primary petitioner in the landmark Supreme Court of Canada case of R v Marshall [1999] 3 SCR 45 regarding native fishing rights.

== See also ==
- List of grand chiefs (Mi'kmaq)
- Grand Council (Mi'kmaq)
