= John Denny Jr. =

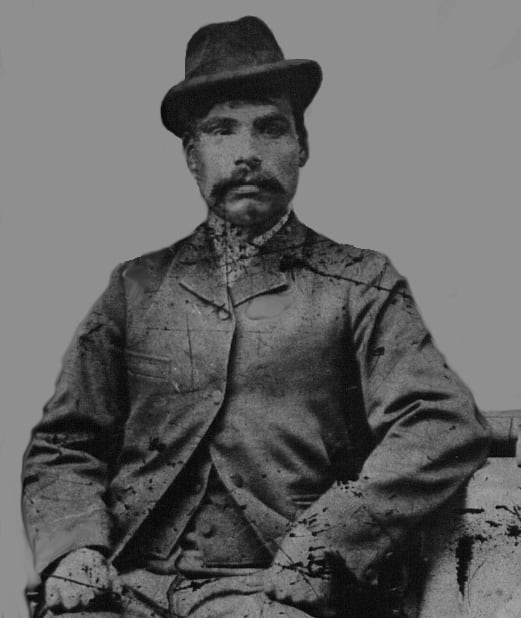
John Denny Jr., Nova Scotia, Canada

John Baptist Denny, Jr. (1842–1918) was the last hereditary grand chief of the Grand Council (Mi'kmaq), from 1881 to 1918.

== Life ==
John Denny Jr was born March 25, 1842, a son of Mi'kmaq Grand Chief John Denny, and his wife Susan Christmas, of Eskanosi Reserve, Cape Breton, Nova Scotia. His wife was Elizabeth Marshall, and together they had 7 children. He died April 12, 1918.

== Career ==
John was the last to inherit the position of Grand Chief from his father. He was groomed and prepared for the position and its responsibilities. Denny spoke Mi'kmaq, English, French, Gaelic and Passamaquoddy, and is recognized for his leadership and negotiation skills. In February 1885, Grand Chief Denny advocated for Joseph Lewis, an elderly Mi’kmaq whose land was taken by a non-Mi’kmaw farmer in Prince Edward Island by pressuring the Indian Affairs in Ottawa. In another example, he defended Mi’kmaq treaty rights to harvest wood for economic purposes.

== Commemoration ==
On 28 January 2019, Temma Frecker, a Nova Scotia teacher at The Booker School, was awarded the Governor General's History Award for her class' proposal to build a statue of Denny in Cornwallis Park. Her proposal was to include the existing Edward Cornwallis statue among three other statues of Acadian Noël Doiron, Black Nova Scotian Viola Desmond and Mi'kmaq Chief John Denny Jr. The four statutes would be positioned as if in a conversation with each other, discussing their accomplishments and struggles.
