= Chapel Island (Canada) =

Island in Richmond County, Nova Scotia, Canada

Coordinates: 45°43′00″N 60°46′57″W

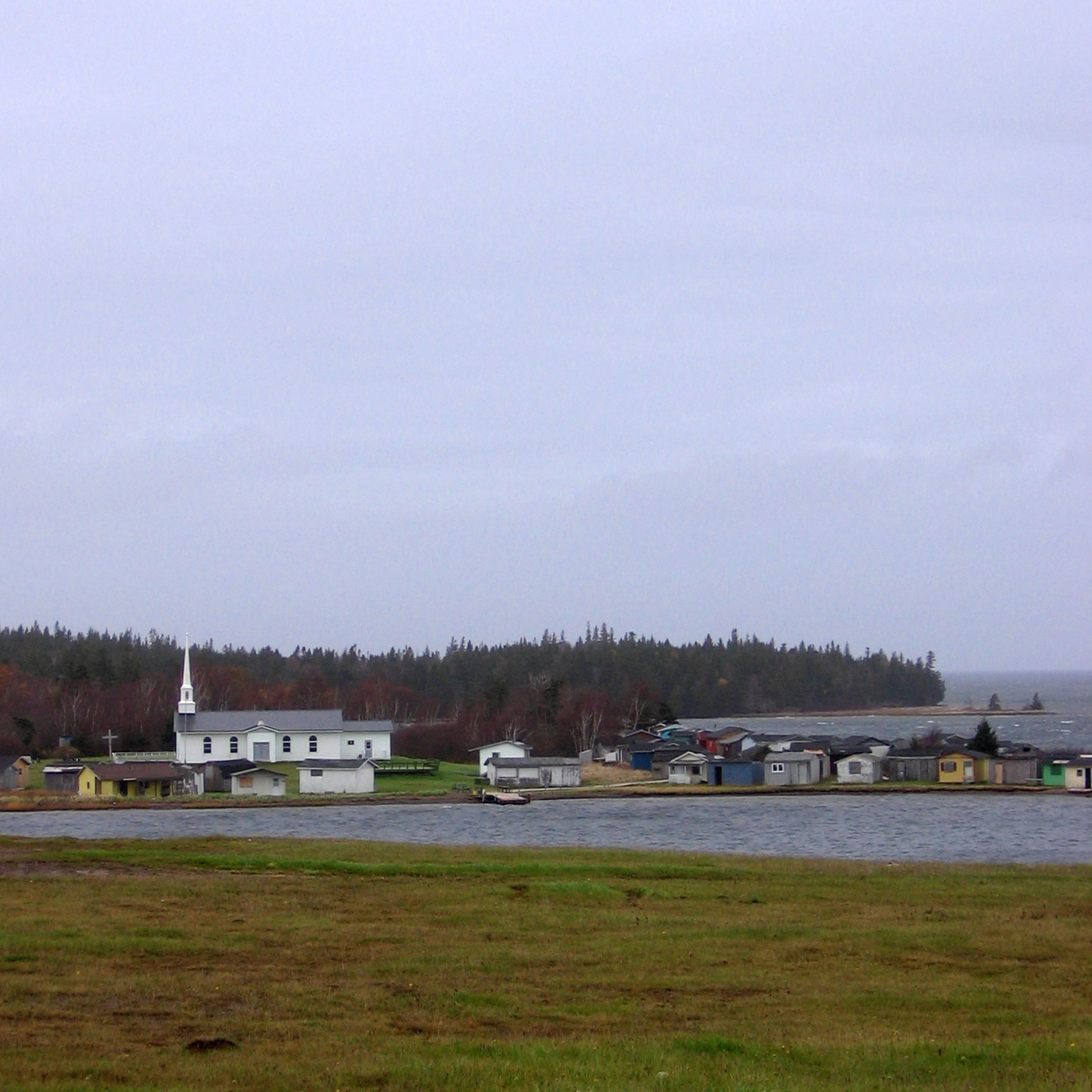
Chapel Island, Potlotek First Nation, Cape Breton, Nova Scotia.

Chapel Island in Nova Scotia

Chapel Island (Mi'kmaq: Potloteg) is an island in Bras d'Or Lake on Cape Breton Island, Nova Scotia, Canada. Its name in the Miꞌkmaq language is Mniku, but it has other names such as Vachelouacadie ("place of running water / running spirits") and Pastukopajitkewe'kati, which translates to "sea cow place".

It is the capital, or fire, of Miꞌkmaꞌki within its home district of Raelen. The island is a sacred Indigenous site and home of St. Anne Mission, an important pilgrimage site for the Mi'kmaq and a place of national historic significance. The island is a National Historic Site of Canada and is part of the Chapel Island First Nation (Potlotek).

== See also ==
- List of National Historic Sites of Canada in Nova Scotia
