= Benjamin Sylliboy =

Grand Chief of the Miꞌkmaq

Benjamin Kji Saqamaw Sylliboy (March 2, 1941 – November 30, 2017) was a Grand Chief of the Miꞌkmaq who lived at the We’koqma’q First Nation in Cape Breton, Nova Scotia, Canada. He served as Grand Chief for 25 years from 1992 until his death in 2017.

== Life ==
Sylliboy was born at the Whycocomagh reserve on Cape Breton, Canada, on 2 March 1941. At the age of 6, Sylliboy's mother sent him to residential schools where he remained for 4 years. After returning to his community, he contracted tuberculosis and was near death for 18 months. After this bout of illness, he attended the Indian Day School and took on a variety of jobs while furthering his education through the Department of Indian affairs. In 1968, he was elected as an ambassador (Keptin) from his community and in 1970 an Indian Act Band Councillor. He served nine terms in this position until being asked by previous Grand Chief Donald Marshall Sr. to take over the role of Grand Chief in 1992 due to his declining health.

== Death ==
Sylliboy died on November 30, 2017, in Sydney, Cape Breton at age 76.

In 1993, Nova Scotia Premier John Savage and Mi’kmaw Grand Chief Ben Sylliboy declared October as the official month to recognize and celebrate Miꞌkmaq culture and heritage in Nova Scotia. He was also a key figure in the renewal of the Miꞌkmaq Grand Council role as a governing body within the Miꞌkmaq community that focuses on the recognition and implementation of Aboriginal and Treaty rights.

== See also ==
- List of grand chiefs (Mi'kmaq)
- Grand Council (Mi'kmaq)
