= Grand Council (Mi'kmaq) =

Ceremonial government of the Mi'kmaq of Canada

Mi'kmaw Grand Council Sante' Mawio'mi Mi'kmawey Mawio'mi

Leadership
- Kji Sagamaw (Grand Chief): Norman Sylliboy
- Putu's: (Wampum keepers)
- Saqamaq: (District chiefs)
- Saqama'sgw: (Women's council)

Meeting place
- Potlotek First Nation; Mniku, Unama'ki, Mi'kma'ki (Nova Scotia, Canada)

The Grand Council (Sante' Mawio'mi or Mi'kmawey Mawio'mi) is the normal senior level of government for the Mi'kmaq, based in present-day Canada, until passage of the Indian Act in 1876, requiring elected governments. After the Indian Act, the Grand Council adopted a more spiritual function. The Grand Council was made up of representatives from the seven district councils in Mi'kma'ki and Keptinaq ("captains"), who were the district chiefs. There were also elders, the putu's, the women's council, and the Grand Chief.

The putu's recorded the Mi'kmaq Grand Council meetings by stories and the creation of wampum belts, a kind of visual history, and dealt with the treaties with other native tribes and non-native groups.

The hereditary chiefs of the traditional Grand Council continue to have a role, but the legal authority to govern has been largely transferred by the Indian Act to the elected chiefs and councils.

== Establishment ==
The Grand Council was created following the collapse of French power in America (1761). Prior to this period, there was no permanent or regular centralized structure and no overall authority. Occasionally, the leading men in some or all of the 14-15 bands would meet in council. Each band had its own chief or saqamaw. The saqamaq met together as equals, and their efforts could as often end in general disagreement as in agreement.

== Grand Chief ==
The Grand Chief was a title given to one of the district chiefs, who was usually from the Mi'kmaq district of Unama'ki (Cape Breton Island). This title was hereditary and usually was passed down to the Grand Chief's eldest son. The Grand Council met on a small island in the Bras d'Or lake in Cape Breton called Mniku. Today it is within the boundaries of the reserve called Chapel Island or Potlotek. To this day, the Grand Council still meets at the Mniku to discuss current issues within the Mi'kmaq Nation.

== District councils ==
The Mi'kmaq territory was divided into seven traditional "districts," each of which had its own independent government and boundaries. The independent governments had a district chief (sagamaw) and a district council which had been elected in a general elections for a period in which they had a total majority in a single constituency in a district with no elected seats and a single district council elected in the district in the constituency for a constituency in the constituency where they are located in a constituency in which the majority of voters were band chiefs, elders, and other worthy community leaders. The district council was charged with performing all the duties of any independent and free government by enacting laws, justice, apportioning fishing and hunting grounds, making war, suing for peace, etc.

Mi'kmaq historian Daniel N. Paul notes many individual Mi'kmaq indeed signed treaties. However, the signators represented only their districts only, and Mi'kmaq protocol was that each district was Sovereign and could sign agreements between nations and would return home to present the agreements to the Mi'kmaq Grand Council, the Council of Women, and finally to all citizens. If consensus occurred, the newly signed treaty would be ratified district by district.

== Local chiefs ==
The local chief looked after the affairs of the village community and presided over the "Council of Elders", the governing body of the village. It was made up of family heads or representatives.

== Band councils ==
There are now approximately 42 Mi'kmaw communities scattered across Nova Scotia, all allotted to and administered by thirteen First Nation Mi'kmaq communities established since 1958–1959. Each community has its own leadership known as the Band Council, with an elected chief and several Councilors. The traditional Grand Council continues to exist and issues rare rulings such as the eviction of SWN Resources from traditional territories .

According to Canadian law, which conflicts to some degree with treaty, international, and Confederacy law, the formal authority to govern has been largely transferred by the Indian Act to the elected Chiefs and Councils defined in that Act. Such a transfer has never been recognized by the Grand Council itself.

== Modern jurisdiction ==
The Grand Council's powers and its role are in some dispute, but clearly, the "elected Chiefs and Councils" do not represent all persons defined in the Indian Act or all lands and waters specified in the treaties. That is the jurisdiction claimed by the present Grand Council. Events in 2013 highlighted the jurisdictional disputes.

The Supreme Court of Canada ruled in January 2013 that Métis and "non-status Indians" were Indians in the sense of the Act (subscription required)but were not represented at all in the Indian Act election and representation structure.

In the Royal Commission on Aboriginal Peoples, one of the key recommendations was to re-form precolonial polities as an overarching body to connect physically- and socially-isolated "reserves" (called "First Nations").

Both the RCAP and the Supreme Court explicitly call for and justify a continuing role for Grand Council jurisdiction over certain cultural, social, environmental or other matters that would reasonably fall within the treaty laws. Interpretation and advocacy under the UN Declaration on the Rights of Indigenous Peoples, which both Canada and the US have signed, are other powers claimed by the modern Grand Council, as evidenced in the SWN case in which it asserted a clear jurisdiction over hydraulic fracturing and other below-ground activities.

On October 17, 2013, what the Ottawa Citizen described as a "heavy-handed response" (or attack) by RCMP on on protesters against fracturing near Rexton, New Brunswick, most of whom were associated with the Elsipogtog band but had support from a dozen local councils in New Brunswick, further highlighted the jurisdictional disputes. Grand Council authority was cited by both native and non-native advocates. Accordingly, some local district councils were clearly seen to defer to Grand Council authority over both provincial and federal and to rely on its treaty rights and UN DRIP to defend their common position calling for a moratorium on "fracking" in New Brunswick.

Several international NGOs including Christian Peacemaker Teams also supported that position .

The events in Rexton resulted in widespread sympathy demonstrations across North America, again bolstering the claim of the Grand Council to have formal authority.

== See also ==
- List of grand chiefs (Mi'kmaq)
