= Charles Worrell =

Canadian politician

Charles Worrell (ca 1770 – January 6, 1858) was a lawyer, land owner and political figure in Prince Edward Island. He represented Kings County in the Legislative Assembly of Prince Edward Island from 1812 to 1825. Worrell died in London in 1858.

He was the son of Jonathan Worrell, a land owner in Barbados. His father gave his property in Barbados to his elder sons, but also purchased land for Charles and his brother Edward on Prince Edward Island in 1803. Worrell was trained as a lawyer and first practised in England. In 1810, Charles registered as a barrister for the island's Supreme Court and came to serve as a justice of the peace, high sheriff and was a Lieutenant-Colonel in the Island Colonial militia. He served in the Island's Council from 1825 to 1836 and in the Legislative Council from 1839 to 1843.

Charles and Edward became owners of Lot 41, most of Lot 39 and part of Lot 40. Becoming the land agent for Lot 42, he eventually purchased it in 1834, also acquiring Lot 43 and Lot 66. In 1838, he purchased his brother's share of their shared properties. Although his now 'estate' was generally less productive in terms of rents from tenancy, leased for agriculture, compared to other land on the island, his properties supported shipyards, sawmills and a carding mill. The Worrell Estate, at its peak in 1843, consisted of Lots 39, 41, 42, 43, 66, and large sections of Lots 38 and 40 – some 81,303 acres.

In 1846, Lot 40 saw the settlement of 204 acres by six Mi'kmaq families, "a free gift of a portion of the lands of his estate to certain Indians, and their descendants." When the Worrell Estate was later purchased by the Government of PEI the Mi'kmaq were moved to a grant of 189 acres on Lot 39, this becoming the Morell Reserve.

== The 1854 Sale of The Worrell Estate ==
At the very time when his land acquisitions had reached their peak, now in his seventies, Worrell began to consider retirement to England. In 1844, he began to sell his land but, found less interest in it than he had hoped; tired and frustrated he turned over his Island affairs to a board of trustees, and left for England in 1848. His board served him ill and he was to wait six more years before the estate was sold, in a transaction amounting to a swindle, as William Henry Pope came to purchase his estate in 1854 for £14,000 and then soon after sell it to the Island government, in the same year for £24,100. At the time of sale the Worrell Estate was some 70, 539 acres, being purchased at $.95 CAD 1875, per acre, regardless of value. Worrell was thus provided with a belated taste of the problems absentee proprietors had often encountered by untrustworthy local agents.

Like many contemporary lawyers in the Colony, Pope was also a land agent, acting for other absentee proprietors, who came to buy the Worrell Estate, working the influence of others, in private dealings with Worrell's PEI trustees, and knowledge of Government intent. Following the Colonial government passing of its 1853 Land Purchase Act, advising him to sell, his trustees delegated an agent to gain Worrell's acquiescence to give up his estate, to the government, for £10 000.

Apparently with no justification, acting on his own, their agent informed Worrell that the government did not in fact wish to buy the property, seeing Worrell suggest that the estate be offered to a private buyer for £9,000, an offer that in-turn was never passed-on. Worrell, impatient to be rid of his debt-encumbered and far-away estate, having no buyer, accepted advice to discuss the matter with Pope, who happened to be on his way to England. Readily accepting Pope's 'better' offer, his PEI estate was privately sold. On 28 December 1854, Pope and his financial backers, his father (Joseph Pope), his father-in-law (Thomas DesBrisay), and George Elkana Morton, then resold the property to the Island (Liberal Coles) Government, a work of jobbery, then unique in its magnitude on the Island.

== The Legacy of The Sale of The Worrell Estate ==
Not immediately rushing to follow his misfortune, two large absentee landholders did follow up The Worrell Estate sale, as the Island Government sought to continue purchasing their estates. In 1860, Dunbar Douglas, Lord Selkirk, offered his remaining holdings to the Island Colonial Government, then embracing parts of Lot 53, all of Lots 57, 58, 59, 60 and Lot 62, containing some 62,059 acres. This a half of the Selkirk Estate, which at its peak in 1831, consisted of Lots 10, 31, 57, 58, 60, and Lot 62, and parts of Lots 12, 53 and Lot 59, some 142,966 acres. Given the mistakes made in the Worrell purchase, now examining issues of land quality, location, rent arrears, taxes and leaseholds, Lord Selkirk was offered $.53 CAD 1875, per acre. His buy-out thus costing the Island $32,891 CAD 1875, the per acre price also stated as 2s 2p Sterling (1875).

Despite years of argument, delay and protest, in July 1866, Sir Samuel Cunard's 'Prince Edward Island land Company' Estate of 212,885 acres was sold to the Island Colonial government, at a stated price of $1.22 CAD 1875 per acre (or 5s Sterling). This much better price, given considerations of better quality, beneficial location, arrears, taxes and leaseholds, the cost would have been $259,720 (CAD 1875), being reported as $257,933.30 in 1866. Following the Cunard Estate sale, two other notable landholders sold their estates: The Montgomery Estate of then 22,931 acres was sold over three years from 1863 to 1866, at $1.05 CAD 1875 per acre and the Haviland Estate of some 24,167 acres was also 'freely' sold to the Island Government, at prices of $.65 and $1.46 CAD 1875 per acre, given different values.

two
