= Chuck and the First Peoples Kitchen =

APTN culinary TV series

- English: Chuck and the First Peoples Kitchen
- French: Chuck et la Cuisine des Premiers Peuples
- Genre: Documentary: Travel, Culture, Food
- Created by: Chuck Hughes; Simon Villeneuve; Carlos Soldevila
- Presented by: Chuck Hughes
- Starring: Chuck Hughes
- Narrated by: Chuck Hughes
- Country of origin: Canada
- Original languages: English; French
- No. of seasons: 3
- No. of episodes: 39

Production
- Running time: 22 minutes
- Production companies: Andicha Média, inc.

Original release
- Network: APTN
- Release: September 10, 2020 – present

Chuck and the First Peoples Kitchen (Chuck et la Cuisine des Premiers Peuples) is a Canadian documentary food and travel television series that premiered on the Aboriginal Peoples Television Network (APTN) on September 10, 2020, in English and on September 14 in French. Hosted by Montreal chef Chuck Hughes, it follows him as he visits Indigenous communities across Canada and learns food-gathering techniques and traditional recipes from community members. Produced by Andicha Média and filmed in both English and French, the series has run for at least six seasons of 13 episodes each, and was nominated for Best Lifestyle Program or Series at the Canadian Screen Awards in 2025.

== Synopsis ==
Eager to discover the culinary traditions of the First Peoples, chef Chuck Hughes goes on tour to visit the country’s multiple Indigenous Communities. Through intimate conversations he learns from mentors who cross his path and becomes a witness of the indigenous cultures.

== Episodes ==
Season	Episodes	Originally released		Status
Season	Episodes	First released	Last released	Status
1	13	September 10, 2020	December 3, 2020	Aired
2	13	January 11, 2022	April 5, 2022	Aired
3	13	January 10, 2023	April 4, 2023	Aired

=== Season 1 (2020) ===
No. overall	No. in season	Title	Original release date
1	1	"Kitigan - Beaver and Maple Syrup"	September 10, 2020
Chuck meets Cezin Nottaway in Kitigan Zibi, an Algonquin community in Quebec, Anishinaabe . With help from Cezin, Chuck learns how to tap maple. Walking through the maple trees, they look for maple water, the sap that maples offer during the spring. Following Cezin’s advices, Chuck boils the maple water until it reaches the maple syrup consistency. As a surprise, a young boy from the community has trapped a beaver. Chuck learns how to cook beaver over a fire and discovers the taste of a “real” beaver tail.
2	2	"Iqaluit - Arctic Char"	September 17, 2020
Chuck travels to Iqaluit, an Inuit community in Nunavut territory where he meets Johnny Flaherty. Chuck and John drive a snowmobile to an ice lake, to fish for Arctic char. Despite a sudden storm and mechanical problems, husband and wife Sheila and Johnny want to share a wide variety of the Inuit diet with Chuck, from bowhead whale, seal fat, sweet arctic shrimp and much more.
3	3	"Iqaluit - Ptarmigan"	September 24, 2020
Chuck meets Solomon Awa in Iqaluit, an Inuit community in Nunavut territory. Solomon is a well-known hunting expert and he invites Chuck to join him and his daughter Josephene to try ptarmigan hunting. Ptarmigan is a partridge whose feathers turn white in winter. Chuck is surprised to learn that Inuit commonly eat the ptarmigan raw. Chuck also visits Qajuqturvik Centre, where he meets culinary chef Michael Lockley and his brigade of apprentice cooks and gives them a hand in the kitchen to help this centre’s mission to fight food insecurity.
4	4	"Pikogan - Wild Geese"	October 1, 2020
Chuck visits Pikogan, an Algonquin community near Amos in Quebec, Anicinape where he meets Israel, David and other local hunters who invite him for a goose hunt. Chuck realizes that he must be patient if he ever hopes to catch a goose as hunters only have a few attempts to shoot before the bird senses the danger and flies away. But Israel and David are determined to hunt geese and teach Chuck how their ancestors cooked the birds over a fire.
5	5	"Gesgapegiac - Lobster"	October 8, 2020
Chuck visits Norma Condo, from a Mi’kmaq community of Gesgapegiac in Quebec. Norma invites Chuck to try lobster fishing with Jeremy Jerome and his crew of fishermen. Norma takes inspiration from traditional techniques for her lobster cooking and uses elements readily around them, such as seaweed and sand.
6	6	"Gesgapegiac - Salmon"	October 15, 2020
Chuck visits Gesgapegiac, a Mi’kmaq community in East Quebec. With Stephen Jerome, Chuck ventures to the edge of Cascapedia River, a salmon river. Chuck also visits Stephen’s workshop where he makes handcrafted baskets using traditional methods taught by his father, ensuring the craftsmanship of his ancestors is not forgotten. Stephen and his niece Angel share with Chuck how to cook salmon the traditional way and they offer recently harvested fiddleheads.
7	7	"Waswanipi - Walleye"	October 22, 2020
Chuck travels to northern Quebec in the Cree community of Waswanipi. With skilled fisherman Matthew Ottereyes, Chuck travels to Waswanipi Lake, hoping to catch walleye. Matthew invites Chuck home to meet his wife Magguie, who is extremely knowledgeable in the cooking of walleye. Magguie teaches Chuck her recipe for walleye and traditional bannock.
8	8	"Manawan - Blueberry Paste and Partridge"	October 29, 2020
Chuck travels to the Atikamekw community of Manawan. Along with Odette, Thérèse and Menic, three women united by community and family ties, Chuck forages for wild blueberries. The three women also introduce Chuck to the partridge hunt by making a traditional slingshot from tree branches and elastics. Odette, Thérèse and Menic share with Chuck the secret of their blueberry paste and a traditional recipe to preserve the taste of the partridge.
9	9	"Six Nations - Soup of Three Sisters"	November 5, 2020
Chuck meets Kitty in Six Nations, Haudenosaunee, Ontario, where several Iroquois nations coexist. Kitty works to preserve the ancestral knowledge of harvesting vegetables within her community. Chuck learns tips on to make a garden and goes through all the steps in the preparation of the soup of the "three sisters"; a staple of the aboriginal diet.
10	10	"Toronto - Urban Indigenous Kitchen"	November 12, 2020
Chuck travels to Toronto, Ontario, where he meets Shawn Adler and Johl Whiteduck Ringuette, who are chefs. They are dedicated to bringing the aboriginal culinary scene to life and they invite Chuck to their restaurants to discuss the cuisine of the First People and its influence within the community. Chuck discusses one of Chef Johl's long-term goals - a dedicated first First Nations neighborhood in Toronto.
11	11	"Wikwemikong - Wild Rice"	November 19, 2020
Chuck travels to Wikwemikong Anishinaabeon Manitoulin Island in northern Ontario to meet Theodore Flamand. Theodore takes Chuck in his boat to the site where he and his colleagues want to reintegrate growing wild rice, one of the flagship plants of the First Peoples' diet. Chuck also learns about the chaga, a mushroom with many properties. Chuck witnesses the traditional harvesting of the wild rice and he discovers three ways culinary chef Hiawatha prepares it.
12	12	"Miawpukek - Moose Hunting"	November 26, 2020
Chuck is invited to take part in a moose hunt with Gregory Jeddore and other local hunters in the community of Miawpukek Mi’kmaq in Newfoundland and Labrador. They locate the animals from a helicopter using calling techniques. Chuck learns about the traditional recipes and preparation techniques used for this animal, highly respected by hunters.
13	13	"Scotchfort - Eel"	December 3, 2020
Chuck travels to Scotchfort on Prince Edward Island, one of three communities of the Abegweit First Nation. Alongside Brezlyn, a young man very involved in his community, Chuck takes part in an eel fishing trip, an integral part of the Mi'kmaq diet. Chuck also meets Junior Peter-Paul, a community elder with whom he has the chance to learn more about oysters as a food that once contributed to the survival of the Mi'kmaq

=== Season 2 (2022) ===
No. overall	No. in season	Title	Original release date
14	1	"Rapid Lake - Ice Fishing"	January 11, 2022
In Rapid Lake, Chuck meets David Thusky, an Algonquin Anishinaabe for whom ice fishing is the perfect way to connect with his family and his community. They set up a camp at Two Islands Lake. Chuck is drilling a few holes on the lake and then the awaited fishing starts. At the end of the day, with some good catches, it’s now time to eat.
15	2	"Wemotaci - Hare Trapping"	January 18, 2022
Chuck travels to Wemotaci in Haute-Mauricie to one of the three Atikamekw communities. He joins community member Roselin Awashish for a trapping adventure. Chuck learns how simple it is to make a trap and places a few in the woods.
16	3	"Wolf Lake - Beaver Trapping"	January 25, 2022
Chuck travels to Hunter’s Point to the community of Anishinaabe, to meet forestry manager Brenda St.Denis and James Jr. St. Denis. Together, they are a team of avid trappers. Beaver is one of their favorite prey and they invite Chuck to jump in their truck and go along for the experience.
17	4	"Pikogan - Pike Fishing"	February 1, 2022
Chuck travels to the community of Pikogan, Anicinape where Alex Mapachee has invited him to fish Pike. The Anishinaabe have always relied on fish for food, medicine, and knowledge. Chuck and Alex jump on his boat with their fishing gear and sail through the Abitibi Lake.
18	5	"Odanak - Fiddlehead Picking"	February 8, 2022
Chuck visits Bécancour where he meets Abenaki chef Lysanne O’Bomsawin, who draws inspiration from her Abenaki roots to create dishes that highlight traditional ingredients. He also meets Jacques Watso in Odanak and learns how to make The Sagamité Watso, a traditional soup from the culinary heritage of the community.
19	6	"Wildlife Reserve in La Vérendrye - Wild Turkey Hunting"	February 15, 2022
Chuck meets young Tommy to hunt, fish and learn more about First Nations Regalia, Mi’gmaq. Chuck is welcomed at the Labelle family land where Tommy spends most of his time when he is not in school. This land is a paradise for hunting and fishing as it brings back the heirs of this proud tradition to territories abounding in game.
20	7	"Mashteuiatsh - Landlocked Salmon Fishing"	February 22, 2022
Chuck visits the community of Mashteuiatsh to fish the landlocked salmon and learn about its importance to this Innu community. Carine Valin and Jean-Pierre Verreault, two passionate fishermen, welcome Chuck and take him on their boat for a fishing trip on Lac Saint-Jean.
21	8	"Gesgapegiag - Clam Harvesting"	March 1, 2022
Chuck travels to Gesgapegiag, Kanien’keha:ka where he harvests clams on the beach and makes a seafood clambake. He meets Quentin Condo, a Micmac who considers Gaspésie his big backyard where he fishes, hunts and harvests everything nature offers him.
22	9	"Odanak - Sturgeon Fishing"	March 8, 2022
Chuck travels to Odanak Anishinaabe to learn everything there is to know about the fish that stands as the symbol of the community: the sturgeon. He meets Luc Nolett, the community’s sturgeon master who is in charge of smoking the fish for Odanak’s pow-wows] and community events.
23	10	"Abitibi-Témiscamingue - Traditional Foraging"	March 15, 2022
Married couple Tara and Lindsay invite Chuck to Temiskaming Anishinaabe to introduce him to The Wild Basket, an initiative that brings traditional foraging techniques to future generations. Chuck discovers their food-processing unit on wheels, a trailer that facilitates the cleaning and processing of the food they harvest.
24	11	"Montreal - Urban Foraging and Meal Preparation"	March 22, 2022
Chuck learns about urban foraging and cooking traditional foods with Montreal’s native communities. He visits Resilience, a shelter located in his home city of Montreal where he meets Nakuset, the woman who made it all happen.
25	12	"Kahnawà:ke - Strawberry Harvesting"	March 29, 2022
In Kahnawà:ke, Chuck visits the community Abenaki garden and learns the virtues of strawberries and corn. Kanerahtiio and his wife Raven envisioned a garden in which all members of Kahnawà:ke could participate, learn new gardening techniques and pass on traditions.
26	13	"Dokis First Nation - Junk Fish Fishing and Bush Cooking"	April 5, 2022
Chuck visits the Dokis First Nation Anishinaabe lands nestled within the flows of the French River. Norman Dokis is waiting for him in his pontoon to take him fishing but the man has a few other surprises that will make Chuck realise how much history is hidden in this beautiful community.

=== Season 3 (2023) ===
No. overall	No. in season	Title	Original release date
27	1	"Mashteuiatsh - Moose Hunting in Winter"	January 10, 2023
Chuck travels to Mashteuiatsh, Ilnu where he hunts and fields dress a moose. He meets Frederick Raphaël, an avid hunter who takes Chuck to a hunting journey in the woods.
28	2	"Wikwemikong, Ontario - Traditional Ice Fishing with Nets"	January 17, 2023
In Wikwemikong, Anishinaabe, Chuck learns how to ice fish the traditional way with a jigger. He meets Anishinabee Russell Trudeau who is an experienced fisherman passionate about ice fishing.
29	3	"Nipissing, Ontario - Wild White Rabbit Snaring"	January 24, 2023
Chuck visits Anishinaabe, Nipissing where he learns how to build snares and hunt the wild white rabbit with Samantha Chevrier who is eager to show him everything there is to know about trapping.
30	4	"Baie-Trinité - Snow Crab Fishing"	January 31, 2023
Chuck meets Captain Norbert Fontaine and his sons and embarks on a snow crab fishing sea adventure Innu. Norbert is a very skilled captain from the Innu community Uashat Mak Mani-Utenam, who was one of the first Innu to receive his boat captain certificate.
31	5	"Nemaska - Duck Hunting"	February 7, 2023
Chuck meets Cree Anderson Jolly Eeyou to hunt wild ducks and smoke them in the traditional way. Anderson works in the wild all year long and he’s eager to show Chuck one of his favorite activities.
32	6	"Winnipeg - Metis Culture and Food Desert"	February 14, 2023
Chuck visits Winnipeg, the largest urban Indigenous population in Canada and learns about Metis cuisine. In this city of contrasts, Chuck meets with passionate indigenous residents who help make this food desert a better place with the help of a community oven.
33	7	"Nutashkuan - Traditional Lobster Fishing"	February 21, 2023
Chuck learns all about traditional lobster fishing and cooking bannock the Innu way with Edouard Kaltush who proudly shows him how to make an artisanal harpoon.
34	8	"Mistissini - Fishing Trip"	February 28, 2023
Chuck travels to Mistissini, Eeyou and experiences fishing in the largest lake in the province of Quebec. He meets Conrad Mianscum, Mistissini's tourism planner who tells him all about his growing community of close to 4000 people.
35	9	"Mattagami First Nation - Harvesting, fishing and sharing with youth"	March 7, 2023
In Mattagami, Chuck meets Ojibway, Betty Naveau, a community member who passionately shares knowledge and traditions with the younger generation. They take a trip to the woods to harvest medicinal plants and visit a hatchery that preserves the lake's fish population.
36	10	"Inukjuak Northern Quebec - Seal hunting"	March 14, 2023
In Inukjuak, Inuit, Chuck learns about seal hunting. This animal, along with caribou, is the main food resource in one of the largest communities in Nunavik.
37	11	"Ekuanitshit - Whelk Fishing"	March 21, 2023
In Ekuanitshit, Innu, Chuck learns all about whelk harvesting and cooking the tasty sea snail. He meets Rita Mestokosho, a writer, poet and the culture and education councilor in the Innu nation and Guy Vigneault, the director of a ten-fleet boat.
38	12	"Standing Buffalo Dakota Nation - Elk hunting"	March 28, 2023
Chuck travels to the Prairies, Cree to hunt one of its most emblematic animals, the elk. He joins the Yuzicapi, a family who has been hunting elk for decades and has made it a tradition.
39	13	"Inukjuak, Northern Quebec - Muskox hunting"	April 4, 2023
Chuck experiences hunting muskox in Nunavik during the summer season. Accompanied by one of the community’s Elders, he follows a herd next to the water and cooks the prey the traditional way.

== Accolades ==
The series was nominated for Best Lifestyle Program or Series at the 2025 Canadian Screen Awards. The nominees were Carlos Soldevila and Simon Villeneuve. A second nomination in the same category was reported for the series' sixth season.

== Filming locations ==
- Iqaluit, an Inuit community in Nunavut territory, Canada
- Waswanipi, a Cree community in Quebec, Canada
- Pikogan, an Algonquin community in Quebec, Canada
- Manawan, an Atikamekw community in Quebec, Canada
- Kitigan Zibi, an Algonquin community in Quebec, Canada
- Wikwemikong on Manitoulin Island in northern Ontario, Canada
- Six Nations, in Ontario, Canada
- Toronto, Ontario, Canada
- Gesgapegiac, a Mi’kmaq community in Quebec, Canada
- Scotchfort, an Abegweit community on Prince Edward Island, Canada
- Miawpukek, Newfoundland and Labrador, Canada

== Broadcast ==
Chuck and the First Peoples Kitchen is a series produced by Andicha Média, and broadcast in English and in French on APTN.

== See also ==
- Anthony Bourdain: No Reservations
- Anthony Bourdain: Parts Unknown
- Gordon Ramsay: Uncharted
