= Belfast, Prince Edward Island =

Belfast
- Rural municipality
- Belfast in Prince Edward Island
- Coordinates: 46°04′45″N 62°52′43″W
- Country: Canada
- Province: Prince Edward Island
- County: Queens County
- Lot: 57 and 58

Area
  - Total: 229.27 km^{2} (88.52 sq mi)

Population (2021)
  - Total: 1,687
  - Density: 7.4/km^{2} (19/sq mi)
- Time zone: AST
  - Summer (DST): ADT
- Area code: 902

Belfast is a rural municipality in Prince Edward Island, Canada. It is located in southeastern Queens County in the townships of Lot 57 and Lot 58.

Situated on the island's south shore along the Northumberland Strait, Belfast is predominantly an agricultural area.

== History ==
Belfast was the landing site of Lord Selkirk's settlers in 1803. These poor displaced Scottish farmers soon established themselves on the best land in the area and it became one of the most productive farming districts in the colony. Until very recently, the area around Belfast was Canadian Gaelic-speaking and added many important works of poetry to Scottish Gaelic literature.

The Presbyterian Scots were joined in the mid-19th century by displaced Irish Great Famine refugees who were forced to take poorer land in surrounding areas. Political, social and religious tensions between the Catholic Irish and the Presbyterian Scottish Gaels boiled over during a general election in March 1847, resulting in what has become known as the Belfast Riot.

In 1917, Rev. Murdoch Lamont (1865-1927), a Gaelic-speaking Presbyterian minister from nearby Orwell, Queens County, Prince Edward Island, published a small, vanity press booklet titled, An Cuimhneachain: Òrain Céilidh Gàidheal Cheap Breatuinn agus Eilean-an-Phrionnsa ("The Remembrance: Céilidh Songs of the Cape Breton and Prince Edward Island Gaels") in Quincy, Massachusetts. In Rev. Lamont's pamphlet and due to his meticulous work as a collector, the most complete versions survive of the Canadian Gaelic oral poetry composed upon Prince Edward Island before the loss of the language there, including the 1803 song-poem Òran an Imrich ("The Song of Emigration") by Selkirk settler Calum Bàn MacMhannain (Malcolm Buchanan) and Òran le Ruaraidh Mór MacLeoid by Ruaraidh Mór Belfast, (Roderick MacLeod), both of whom were born on the Isle of Skye, but emigrated to the Belfast district.

== Demographics ==
Federal census population history of Belfast
Year	Pop.	±%
2016	1,636	—
2021	1,687	+3.1%
Source: Statistics Canada

In the 2021 Census of Population conducted by Statistics Canada, Belfast had a population of 1,687 living in 674 of its 971 total private dwellings, a change of 3.1% from its 2016 population of 1,636. With a land area of 229.27 km^{2} (88.52 sq mi), it had a population density of 7.4/km^{2} (19.1/sq mi) in 2021.

== Economy ==
One of the region's major employers is Northumberland Ferries, which operates a terminal in Wood Islands. This ferry service, which connects Prince Edward Island to Caribou, Nova Scotia, was first established in 1941. Two ferryboats, the MV Confederation and MV Northumberland, currently service the route.

== Attractions ==
Belfast's major recreational component to their community include, Belfast Rec Center which includes one ice surface, a community room, a canteen & a skate sharpening service; Belfast Highland Greens, a 9-hole golf course, Belfast Community Pool which includes two outdoor pools, a kiddy pool and canteen services, as well as a softball field beside the rink. Belfast is also home to a community-operated campground at Lord Selkirk Provincial Park.

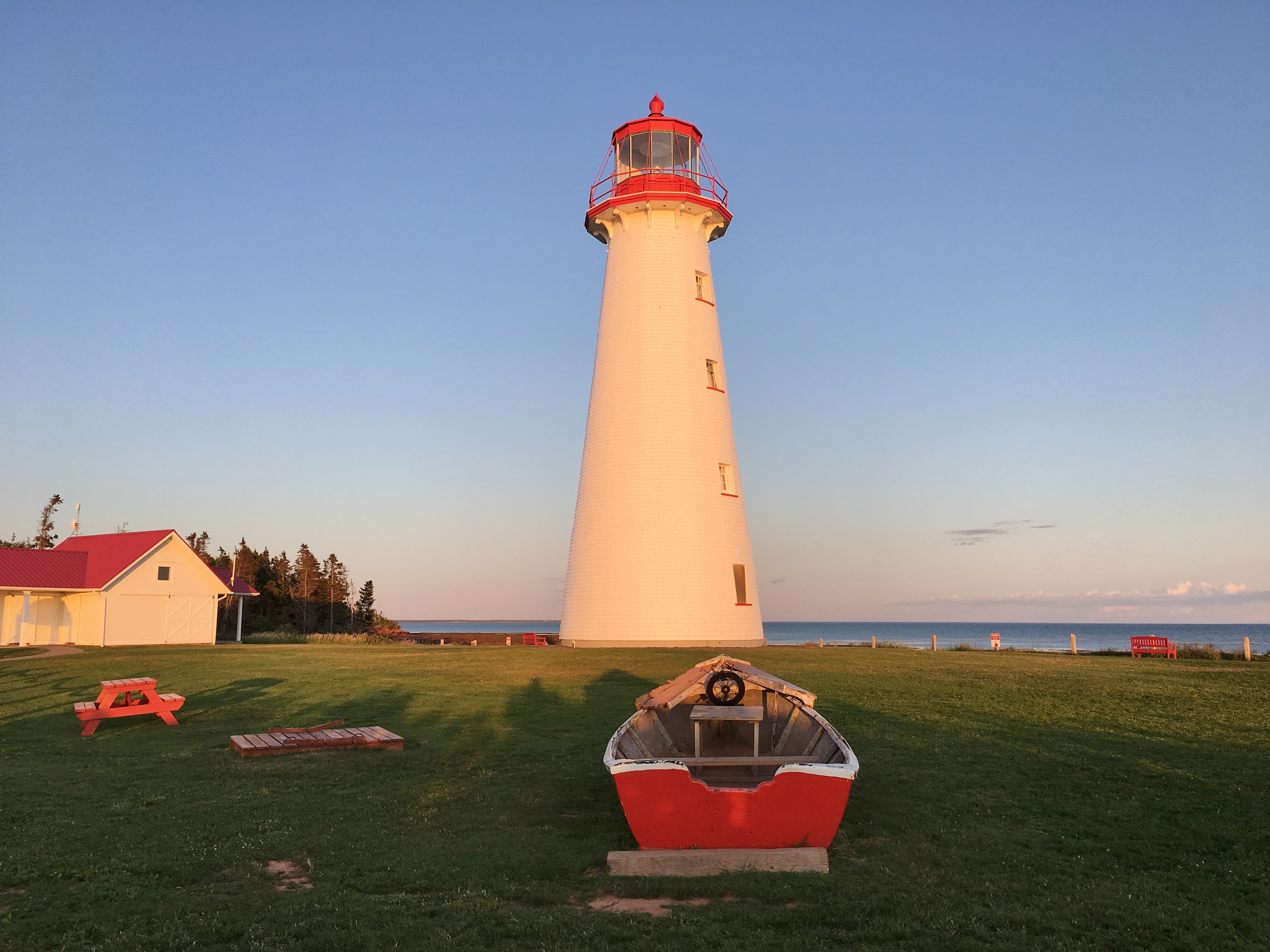
Point Prim Lighthouse at sunset (August 2019)

Also of interest is the lighthouse at nearby Point Prim, which was designed by Architect Isaac Smith in 1845 (notable for designing Province House (Prince Edward Island)) and is the oldest lighthouse on the Island. The 18.2 m (60 foot) structure is also the only round brick lighthouse on PEI and one of the last of its kind in Canada.

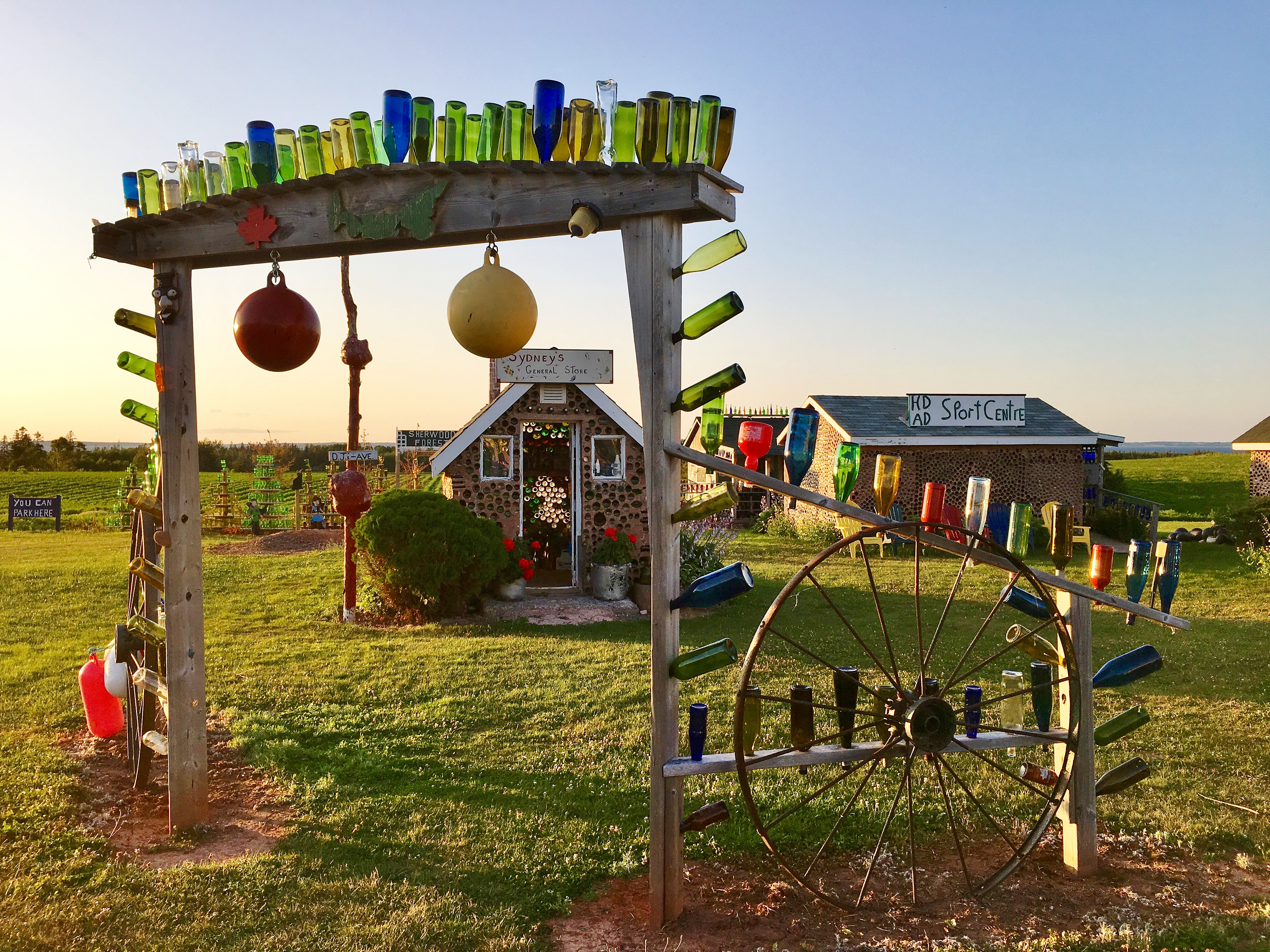
Hannah's Bottle Village (August 2019)

On the road to Point Prim Lighthouse is Hannah's Bottle Village, a local tourist attraction made up of several miniature buildings constructed of glass bottles and cement. There is no admission charge, but donations to the IWK Health Centre in Halifax are accepted.

Of particular note is the local parish church, St. John's. Built in 1824 in the style of Sir Christopher Wren, Saint John's is today under the pastoral care of Rev. Roger W.MacPhee. In 2005, the church invited Robin Mark, a popular Christian musician from Belfast, Northern Ireland, to lead their "Emerging Church Conference." The E.C.C. was such a success that Mr. Mark returned in 2006 for "Revival in Belfast II" and was scheduled to be back in 2007 along with Pastor Paul Reid. Saint John's has the largest Presbyterian Sunday school east of Montreal.

In addition to Saint John's, Belfast is home to two other churches, namely, Saint Michael's Roman Catholic, and Wood Islands Presbyterian. Many residents of the community attend worship services in Charlottetown or Montague.

== Education ==
Students in the area attend Belfast Consolidated School. From grade 10 through grade 12, they attend Montague Regional High School. Both schools are administered by P.E.I.'s Public Schools Branch.

== Politics ==
Belfast is part of the provincial electoral district of Belfast-Murray River. Currently the Member of the Legislative Assembly of Prince Edward Island is Progressive Conservative Darlene Compton.

== Notable people ==
Notable "Belfasters" include former P.E.I. premier John Angus MacLean (d. 2000).

Dr. Angus MacAulay, b. 10 December 1759, a lay preacher and medical doctor, was instrumental in helping to establish the first church (a log structure) in 1804. Macaulay was thus easily elected to the House of Assembly in 1806 as a representative of Queens County. When Lieutenant Governor Smith called for elections to a new assembly in 1818, Macaulay was returned from Queens County, and was an active speaker of the house government. Elected again in 1820, Macaulay was once more chosen speaker when the house convened in July. Macaulay stood by his people publicly and privately for more than a quarter of a century. He gave a plot of his own land in Point Prim for a cemetery (where he buried his own daughter). The Polly Cemetery is still used by locals today in the community of Belfast. d. 6 December 1827.

Dougald MacKinnon (15 December 1886 – 21 August 1970) was a farmer, fisherman and political figure on Prince Edward Island. He represented 4th Queens in the Legislative Assembly of Prince Edward Island from 1935 to 1959 as a Liberal. He was known for repeatedly working for his constituent. As a people person he was well regarded in the community of Belfast. He served in the province's Executive Council. His portfolio included Minister of Public Works and Highways, Minister of Industry and Natural Resources and was the first Minister of Fisheries for the Province of PEI. He was also involved in the local Belfast Historical Society and served as President of The St Andrew's Society.

The members of the band Paper Lions come from Belfast.

== Communities ==
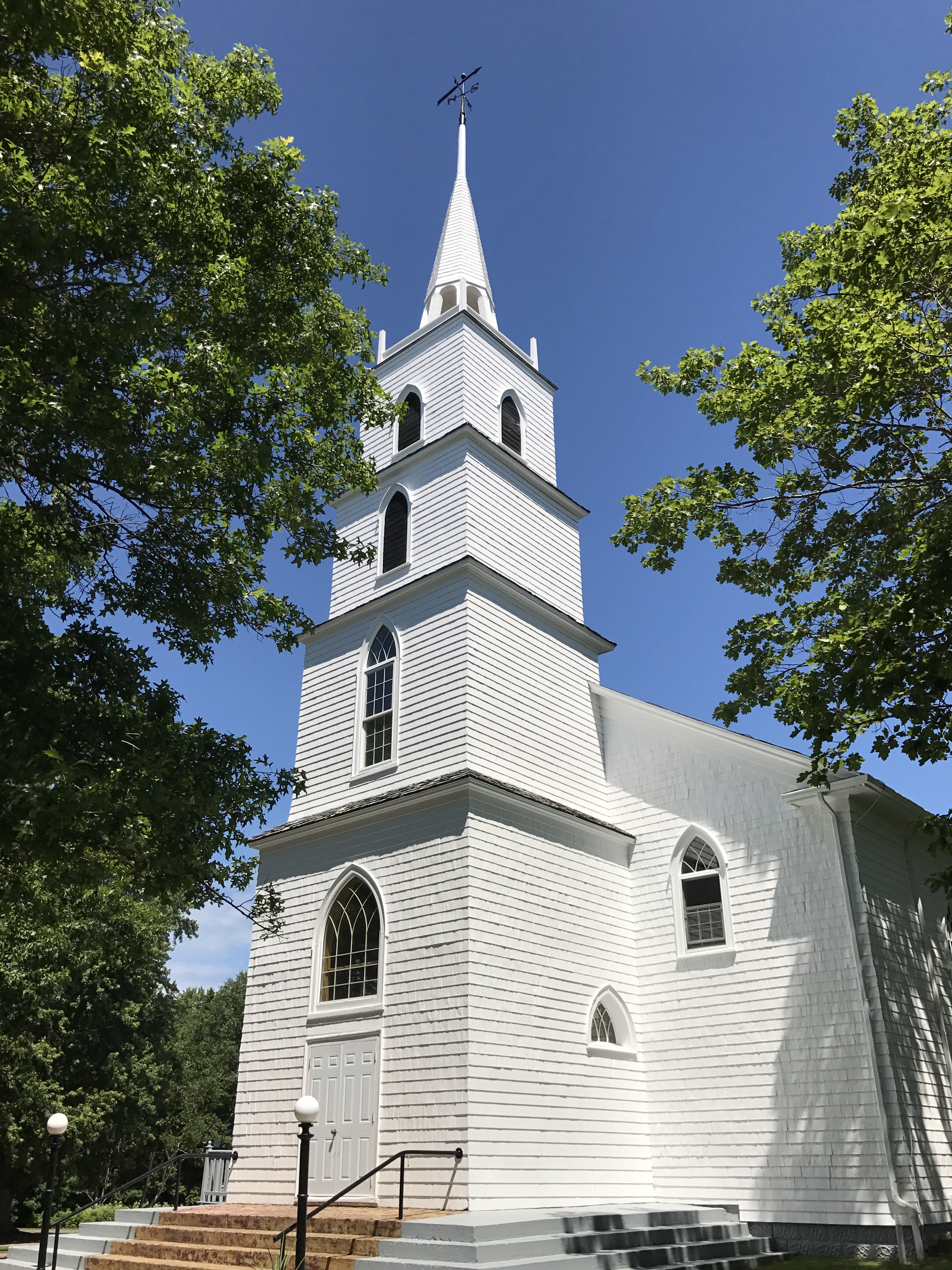
St. John's Presbyterian Church in Belfast

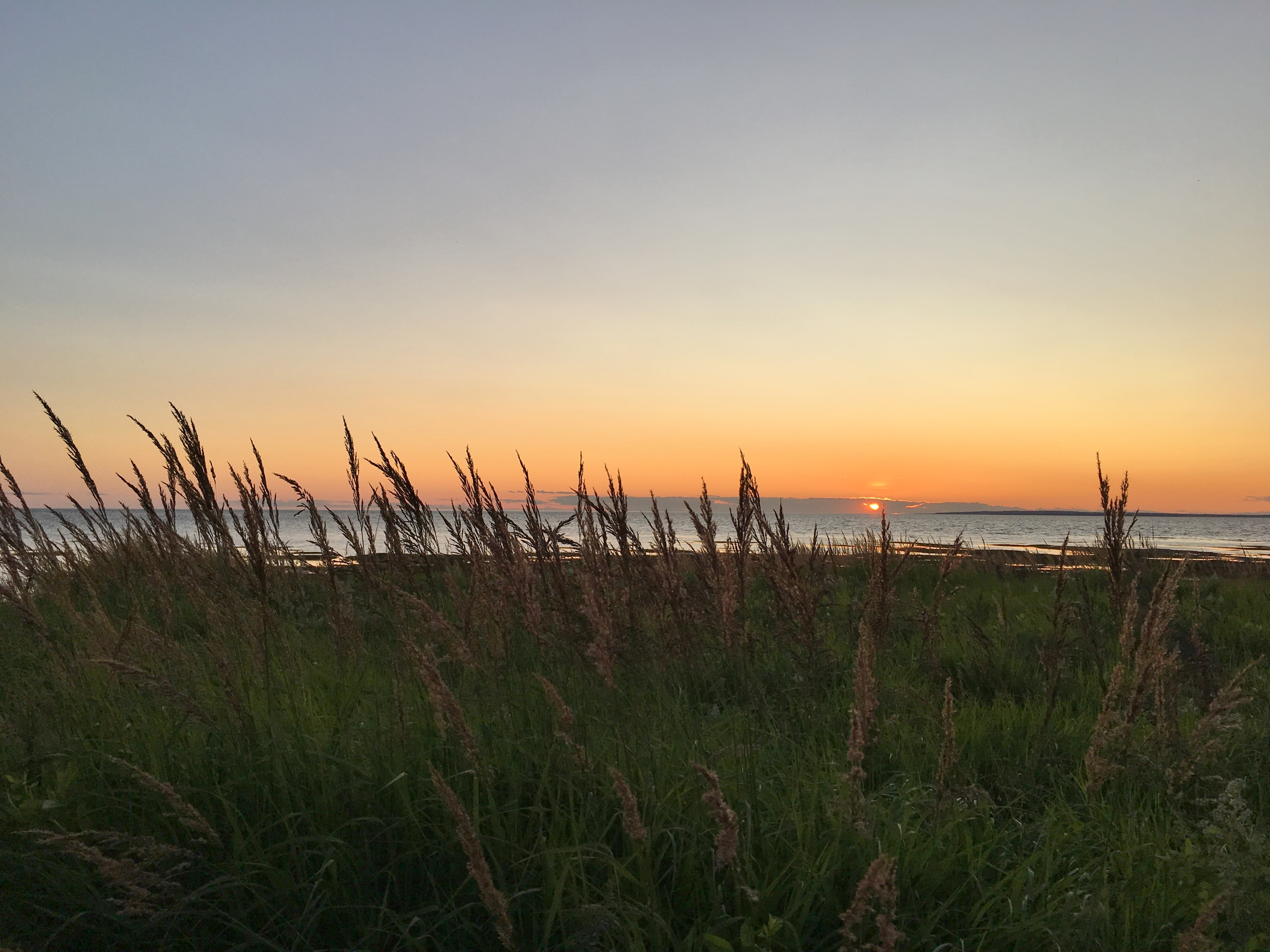
Sunset over the water in Point Prim (August 2019)

The Community of Belfast was incorporated in 1972 and contains the following localities or settlements:

- Belfast
- Melville
- Iona
- Culloden
- Eldon
- Flat River
- Fodhla
- Garfield
- Lower Newtown
- Mount Buchanan
- Mount Vernon
- Pinette
- Roseberry
- Valley
- Surrey
- Belle River
- Wood Islands
- Point Prim
