= Savage Harbour =

Savage Harbour Havre à l'Anguille Havre aux Sauvages
- Community
- Location of Savage Harbour in Prince Edward Island
- Coordinates: 46°25′18″N 62°51′49″W
- Country: Canada
- Province: Prince Edward Island
- County: Queens County; Kings County
- Parish: St. Patrick's
- Township: Lot 38
- Time zone: UTC-4 (AST)
  - Summer (DST): UTC-3 (ADT)
- Canadian postal code: C0A 1T0
- Area code(s): 902 and 782
- NTS Map: 011L07
- GNBC Code: BABIG

Savage Harbour is the name of a Canadian rural community and adjacent bay located on the boundary of Queens County and Kings County, Prince Edward Island. It is located in the township of Lot 38, north of Mount Stewart. It is adjacent to the Crowbush Cove Wharf small craft harbour, formerly known as the Savage Harbour small craft harbour.

In 2022, the chief of nearby Abegweit First Nation began an effort to change the name of the community and bay, due to negative associations of the term "savage" as it relates to indigenous peoples. In 2025, the Government of Prince Edward Island announced that the community and bay would be officially renamed, and the community would be canvassed to aid in determining the new name(s).

== History ==
Indigenous nomads first settled the area c. 1000 BC. The community's name in the Mi'kmaq language is Katewpijk, meaning "eel trap place", which was recorded on several maps using various spellings by Acadian settlers beginning in the 1720s. One of the subsequent Acadian names for the community, Eel Harbour (French: Havre à L'Anguille) also incorporated this meaning. Another Acadian name used for the area was Le Moulin à Vent, which translates in English to "the windmill".

According to the first census of Prince Edward Island (then Isle Saint-Jean) in 1728, an Acadian farming family consisting of 10 people were the first of European descent to colonize what is now Savage Harbour in 1725.

The origin of the community's current English name stems from the French name Havre aux Sauvages, which translates to "Indian Harbour" according to PEI Acadian historian Georges Arsenault. Havre aux Sauvages first appeared as the community's name in a French census and in select maps just prior to the expulsion of the Acadians from the area in 1758, but precise details surrounding its origin remain uncertain.

Two dolphins were rescued from Savage Harbour in late summer 2016, in addition to a third in nearby Rustico, as part of what was termed a mass stranding event. In Spring 2021, several boats began running aground in the mouth of Savage Harbour bay, after a combination of windy conditions, very low tides and ocean currents built up a sandbar. The harbour authority president said at the time that shifting sands have often been a problem in the area, and that he'd reached out to Fisheries and Oceans department officials to request dredging. Department officials responded by stating they would recheck water depth in the area, and a plan of action would be developed based on the results.

== Controversy over name ==
In the early 2020s, an effort to change the name of Savage Harbour was led by Abegweit First Nation chief Roderick Gould Jr., due to the disparaging association of the term "savage" with indigenous peoples. On National Indigenous Peoples Day 2022, Gould officially requested that the Government of Prince Edward Island change the name. In his request, Gould stated that he was "formally calling on the premier and the province of P.E.I." to change the name and to "get rid of the word savage". He continued, saying "Islanders, as I've said before and I always say this, we can do better".

Some residents of the community, who did not wish to speak on record, were reported as opposing the name change, worried that it could "create confusion and expense for local residents and businesses". Gould opined that he found it "amazing that there's even a conversation" about not being completely supportive of such a name change in "a woke society". Area historian Georges Arsenault said that the original French term sauvage from which the English name is translated is not as pejorative as its English counterpart, and cited the French term for wildflowers (fleurs sauvage) as an example of the term's more innocuous meaning. He said he understood "why there would be interest" in changing the name, as it "doesn't convey a good feeling" in English.

=== Official name changes ===
In 2024, the adjacent wharf was officially renamed to Crowbush Cove from Savage Harbour after consultation with Gould and the Abegweit First Nation. As the wharf is federally operated, the Government of Canada officially enacted the name change. The name of the community and bay, whose naming is under the jurisdiction of the provincial government, remained as Savage Harbour.

In September 2025, as part of an initiative to "remove derogatory place names", the Government of Prince Edward Island confirmed that the name of both the Savage Harbour community and Savage Harbour bay would be changed, and that the residents of the community would be canvassed for aid in determining a new name. The provincial government specified that the new name of the community and the new name of the bay "can be different" from each other. The province will hold three community meetings at Mount Stewart Consolidated School between October 15 and December 1, 2025—the last of which will include an in-person ballot—to determine the new name(s). The meetings and ballot are open only to residents of Savage Harbour.
