= Lot 41 =

Lot 41 may refer to:

- Lot 41, Prince Edward Island, a township on Price Edward Island, Canada
- Lot 41, the sea kayak used for the first kayak crossing of the Tasman Sea
