= 63rd Regiment of Foot (disambiguation) =

Two regiments of the British Army have been numbered the 63rd Regiment of Foot:

- 63rd Regiment of Foot, raised in 1757 and renumbered as the 78th in 1758
- 63rd (West Suffolk) Regiment of Foot, raised in 1758
