= Peter Innes =

Peter Innes is the name of:

- Peter Innes (footballer), Scottish footballer in 2012–13 Forfar Athletic F.C. season
- Sir Peter Innes of the Innes baronets, of Balvenie
- Captain Peter Innes who was awarded Lot 50, Prince Edward Island
- Peter Innes (dentist) (1941–2021), professor of dentistry at the University of Otago
