= Lot 57, Prince Edward Island =

- Township
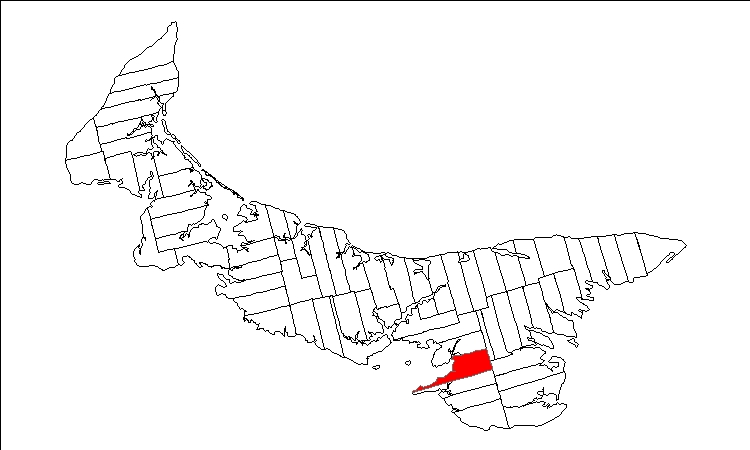
- Map of Prince Edward Island highlighting Lot 57
- Coordinates: 46°7′N 62°50′W
- Country: Canada
- Province: Prince Edward Island
- County: Queens County,
- Parish: St. John's Parish

Area
  - Total: 37.24 sq mi (96.44 km^{2})

Population (2006)
  - Total: 999
  - Density: 27/sq mi (10.4/km^{2})
- Time zone: UTC-4 (AST)
  - Summer (DST): UTC-3 (ADT)
- Canadian Postal code: C0A
- Area code: 902
- NTS Map: 011L02
- GNBC Code: BAESR

Lot 57 is a township in Queens County, Prince Edward Island, Canada. It is part of St. John's Parish. Lot 57 was awarded to merchant Samuel Smith and Captain James Smith in the 1767 land lottery. By 1803, it had been sold to the Thomas Douglas, 5th Earl of Selkirk.

== Villages ==
- Belfast, Prince Edward Island

== Unincorporated communities ==
- Bellevue
- Eldon
- Grandview
- Iona
- Kinross
- Lower Newtown
- Lyndale
- Mount Buchanan
- Newtown Cross
- Orwell
- Orwell Cove
- Point Prim
- Township 57
