= Wolf Lake (Ontario) =

Lake in Sudbury District, Ontario, Canada

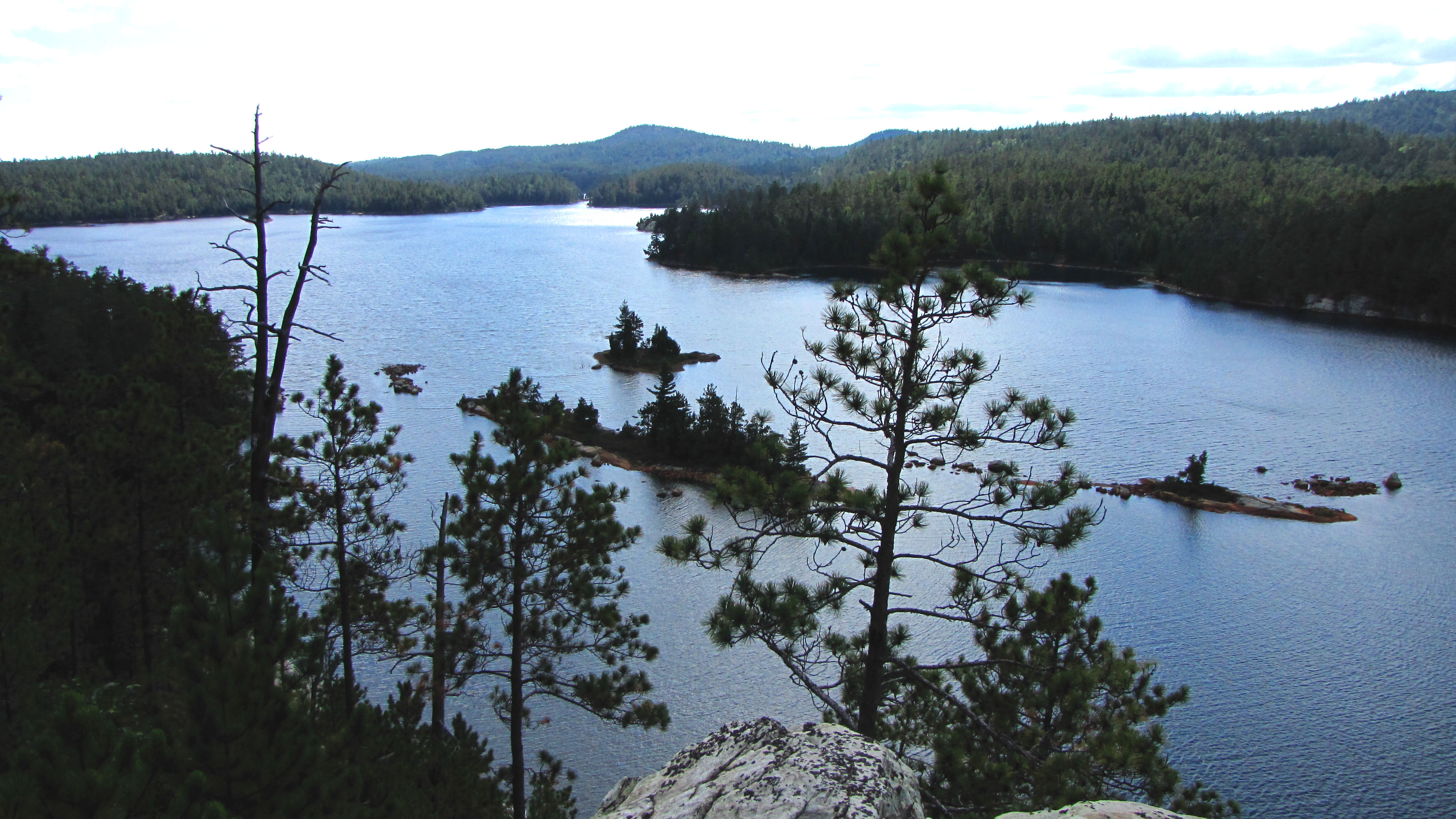

- Location within Ontario
- Location: Sudbury District, Ontario
- Coordinates: 46°51′09″N 80°38′06″W
- Basin countries: Canada
- Max. length: ca. 1,910 m (6,270 ft)
- Max. width: ca. 910 m (2,990 ft)
- Surface elevation: 504 m (1,654 ft)
- References: Wolf Lake

Wolf Lake is a freshwater lake in the Sudbury District Census Division in the Canadian province of Ontario. The lake is located in the Wolf Lake Forest Preserve which is within (but not part of) the Chiniguchi River Waterway Provincial Park, a protected area. The Wolf Lake Forest Reserve contains the world's largest remaining old-growth red pine forest; with trees estimated to be between 140 and 300 years old. In March 2012, the provincial government reaffirmed the protected status of Wolf Lake Old Growth Forest Reserve but in late May renewed the mining leases in the area as well.

== See also ==
- Listing of the major lakes in Canada
