= Scotchfort, Prince Edward Island =

Rural community in Prince Edward Island, Canada

Coordinates: 46°21′N 62°55′W

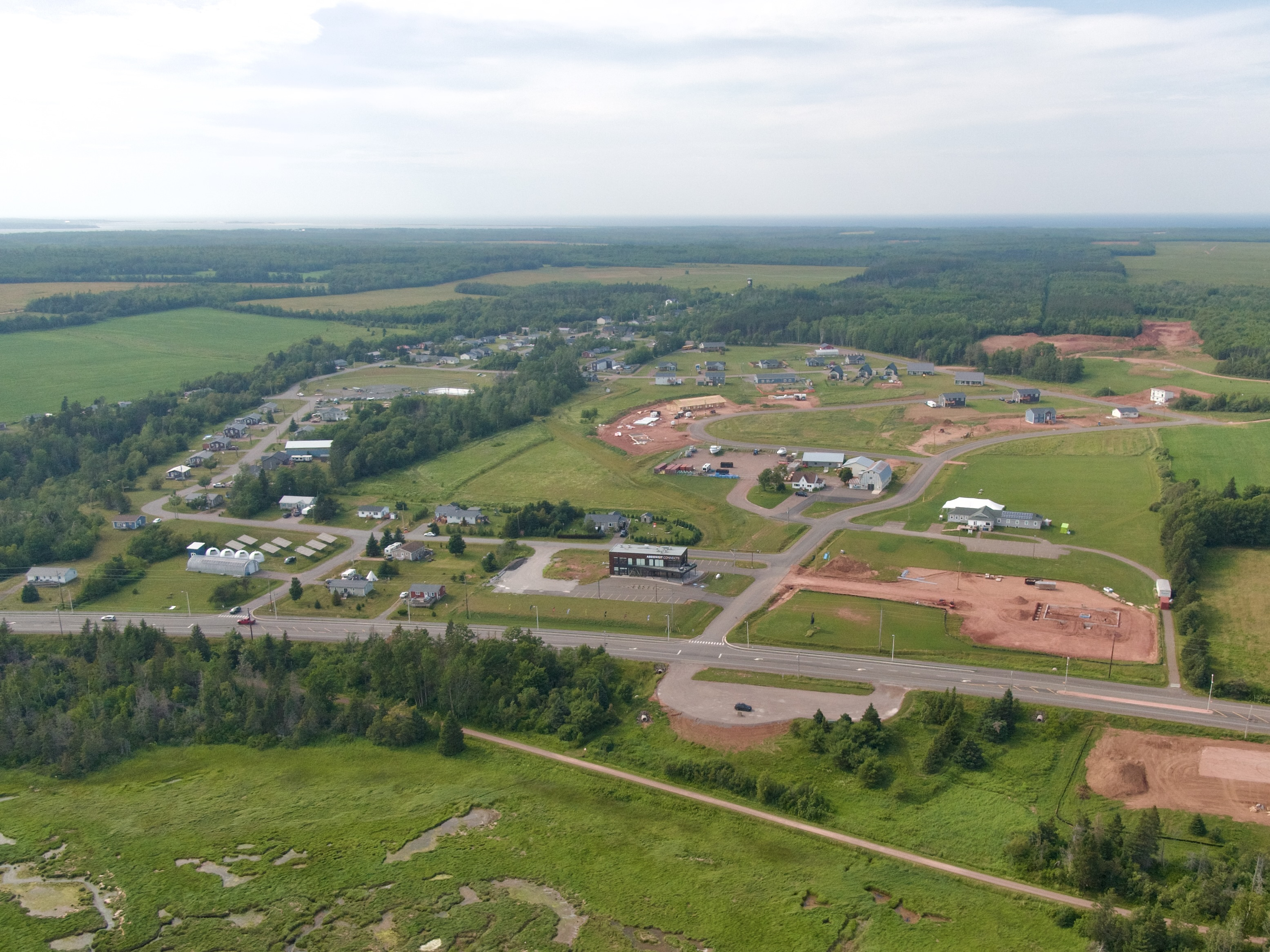
Abegweit First Nation reserve

Scotchfort (46º21'N, 62º55'W) is an unincorporated Canadian rural community in northeastern Queens County, Prince Edward Island, southwest of the village of Mount Stewart.

Primarily a farming community on the west bank of the upper Hillborough River, it also contains the reserve Scotchfort 4 which is administered as part of the Abegweit First Nation of the Mi'kmaq.
