= Morell 2 =

Coordinates: 46°21′29″N 62°42′24″W

Morell 2 in Prince Edward Island

Morell 2 is a Mi'kmaq reserve located in Kings County, Prince Edward Island. In the 2016 Census, the reserve has 22 residents.

Morell 2 is located in the community of Green Meadows on the west bank of the Morell River, approximately 8 km (5.0 mi) south of Morell.

It is administratively part of the Abegweit First Nation.
