= Lot 39, Prince Edward Island =

- Township
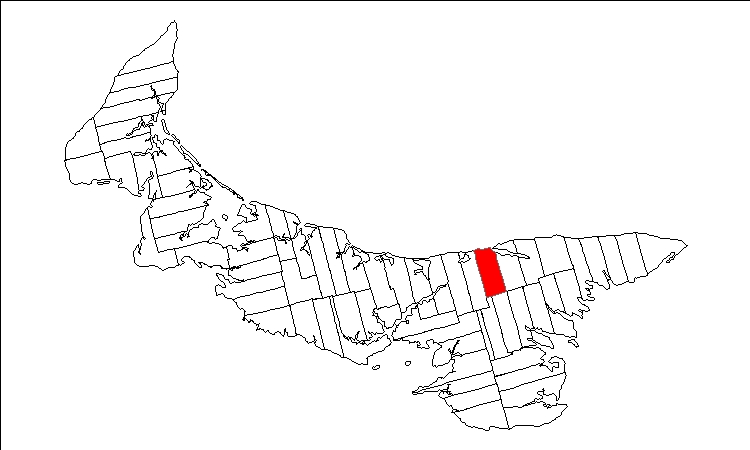
- Map of Prince Edward Island highlighting Lot 39
- Coordinates: 46°22′N 62°44′W
- Country: Canada
- Province: Prince Edward Island
- County: Kings County,
- Parish: St. Patrick's Parish

Area
  - Total: 32.42 sq mi (83.97 km^{2})

Population (2006)
  - Total: 657
  - Urban density: 20/sq mi (7.8/km^{2})
- Time zone: UTC-4 (AST)
  - Summer (DST): UTC-3 (ADT)
- Canadian Postal code: C0A
- Area code: 902
- NTS Map: 011L07
- GNBC Code: BAERZ

Lot 39 is a township in Kings County, Prince Edward Island, Canada. It is part of St. Patrick's Parish. Lot 39 was one of four lots awarded to the officers of the 78th Fraser Highlanders in the 1767 land lottery. Col. Thomas Dawson purchased 500 acres (2.0 km^{2}) of land in Lot 39 on March 19, 1800, for 135 pounds, 8 shillings and 4 pence, later adding another 100 acres (0.40 km^{2}). He emigrated from Coote Hill, County Cavan, Ireland with wife Elizabeth and six children, arriving in PEI on June 6, 1801. Col. Thomas Dawson (1762–1804) called his new property Dawson's Grove, after a Dawson family property in Ireland. He is buried at Elm Avenue Cemetery, Charlottetown, PEI.
