= Mount Buchanan, Prince Edward Island =

Coordinates: 46.081°N 62.938°W

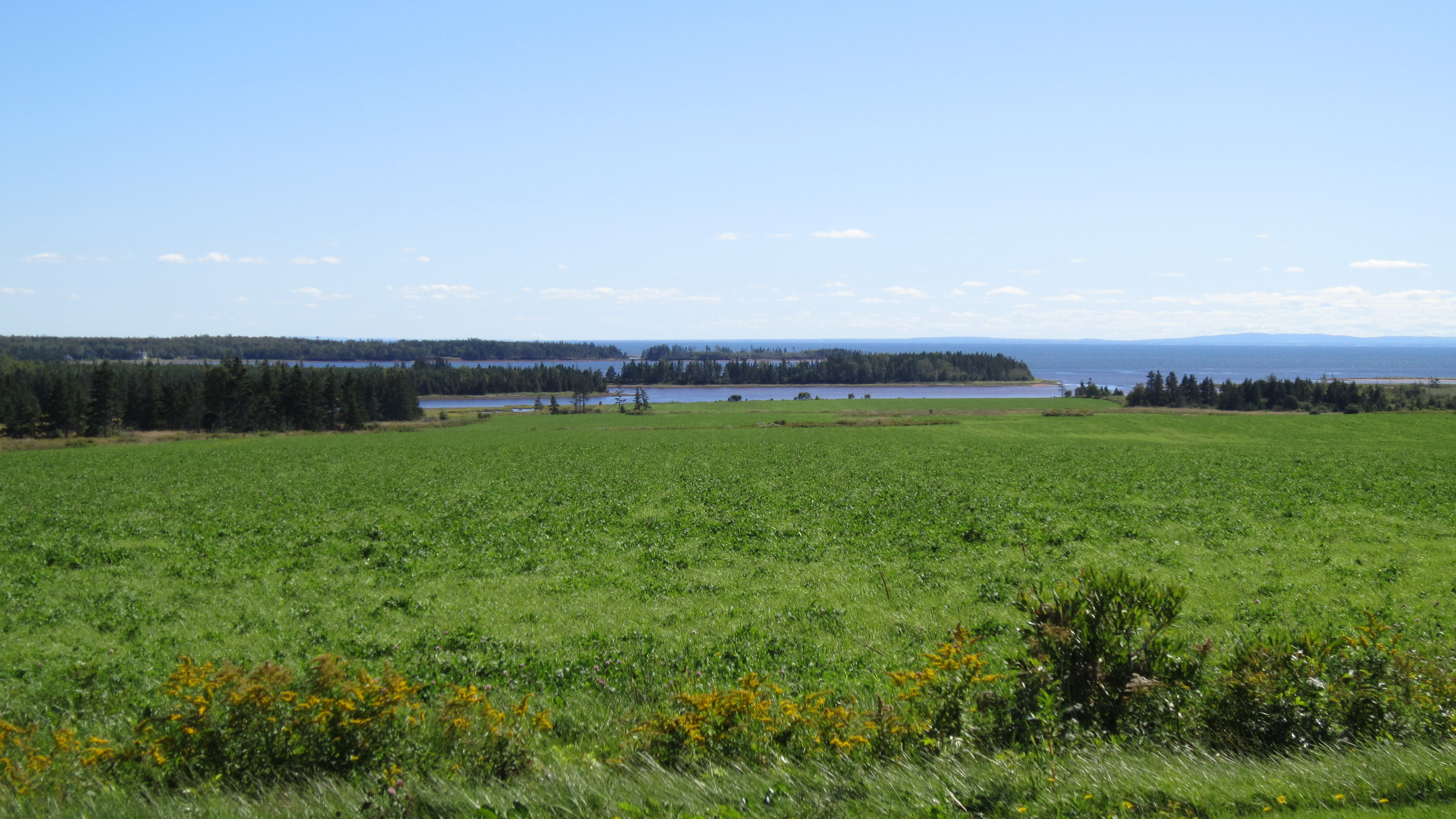
A view from Point Prim Road at Mount Buchanan

Mount Buchanan, Prince Edward Island

Mount Buchanan is a small unincorporated community in Prince Edward Island, Canada. Located southeast of Charlottetown, it is part of the Community of Belfast.
