= St. John's Parish, Prince Edward Island =

Coordinates: 46°2′46.4″N 62°52′55.1″W

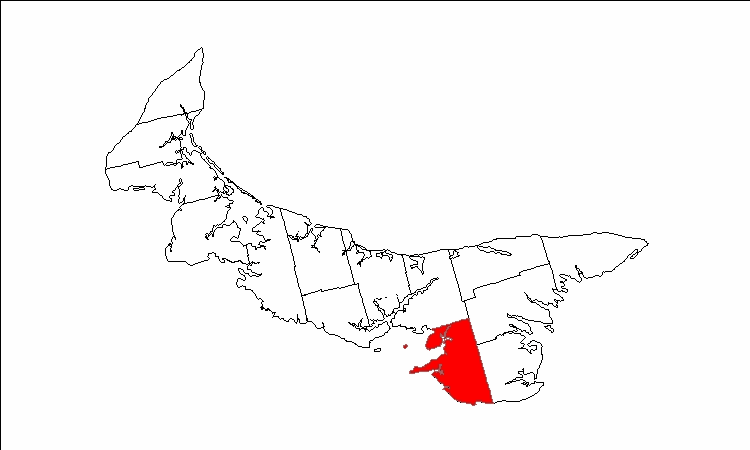

St. John's Parish was created as a civil parish in Queens County, Prince Edward Island, Canada, during the 1764–1766 survey of Samuel Holland.

It contains the following townships:

- Lot 50
- Lot 57
- Lot 58
- Lot 60
- Lot 62
