= Rocky Point 3 =

Coordinates: 46°12′13″N 63°8′35″W

Rocky Point 3 in Prince Edward Island

Rocky Point 3 is a Mi'kmaq reserve located in Queens County, Prince Edward Island. In the 2016 Census, the reserve had 51 residents.

Rocky Point 3 is located in the community of Rocky Point on the southwest shore of Charlottetown Harbour, approximately 16 km (9.9 mi) southeast of Cornwall.

It is administratively part of the Abegweit First Nation.
