= Lot 38, Prince Edward Island =

- Township
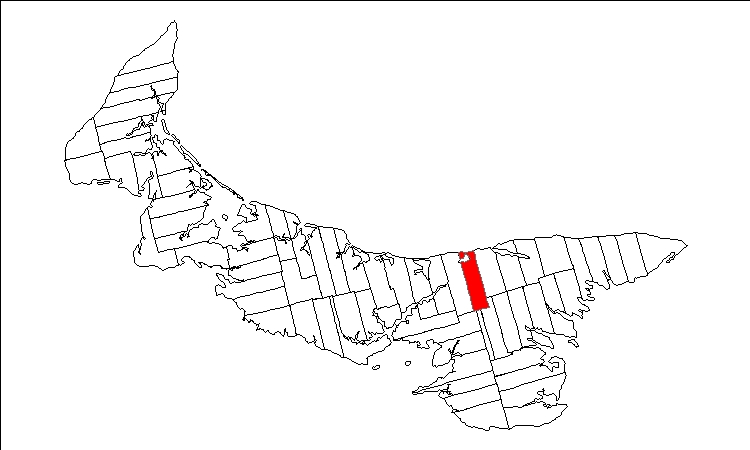
- Map of Prince Edward Island highlighting Lot 38
- Coordinates: 46°20′N 62°48′W
- Country: Canada
- Province: Prince Edward Island
- County: Kings County,
- Parish: St. Patrick's Parish

Area
  - Total: 31.17 sq mi (80.72 km^{2})

Population (2006)
  - Total: 500
  - Density: 16/sq mi (6.2/km^{2})
- Time zone: UTC-4 (AST)
  - Summer (DST): UTC-3 (ADT)
- Canadian Postal code: C0A
- Area code: 902
- NTS Map: 011L07
- GNBC Code: BAERY

Lot 38 is a township in Kings County, Prince Edward Island, Canada. It is part of St. Patrick's Parish. Lot 38 was one of four lots awarded to the officers of the 78th Fraser Highlanders in the 1767 land lottery.
