= Lot 58, Prince Edward Island =

- Township
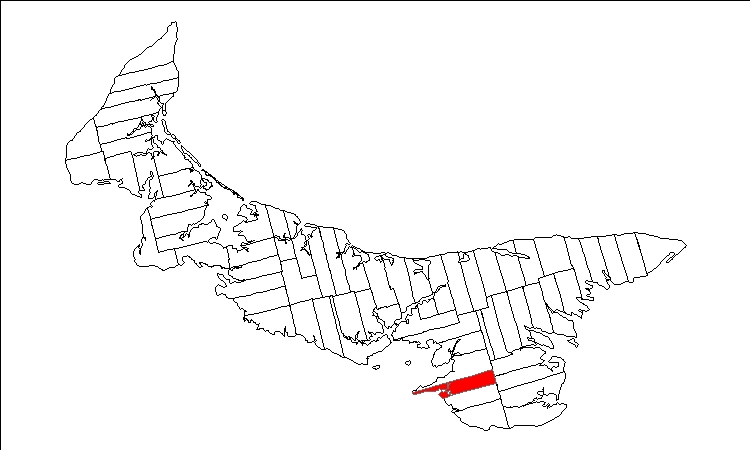
- Map of Prince Edward Island highlighting Lot 58
- Coordinates: 46°4′N 62°50′W
- Country: Canada
- Province: Prince Edward Island
- County: Queens County
- Parish: St. John's Parish

Area
  - Total: 28.73 sq mi (74.40 km^{2})

Population (2006)
  - Total: 521
  - Density: 18/sq mi (7/km^{2})
- Time zone: UTC-4 (AST)
  - Summer (DST): UTC-3 (ADT)
- Canadian Postal code: C0A
- Area code: 902
- NTS Map: 011L02
- GNBC Code: BAESS

Lot 58 is a township in Queens County, Prince Edward Island, Canada. It is part of St. John's Parish. Lot 58 was awarded to Joshua Mauger in the 1767 land lottery. It passed to Alexander Anderson after 1775, to Alexander Ellice by 1798, and to the Earl of Selkirk by 1803.

== Villages ==
- Belfast

== Unincorporated communities ==
- Fodhla
- Garfield
- Glasbhein
- North Pinette
- Ocean View
- Pinette
- Pinette North
- Pinette South
- Surrey
- Township 58
- Valley
