= Lot 60, Prince Edward Island =

- Township
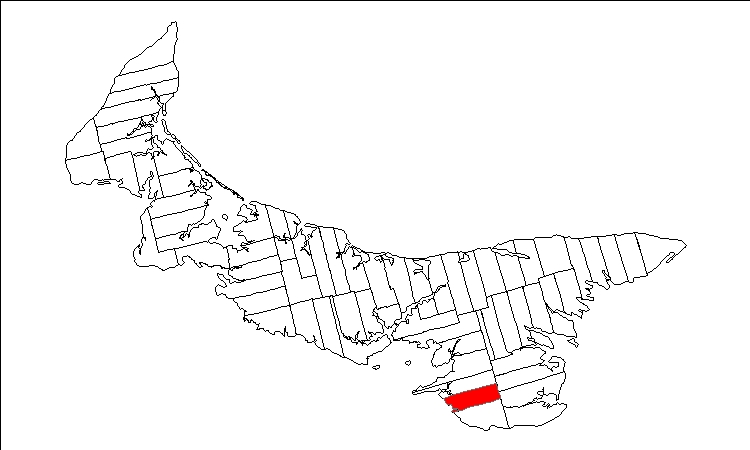
- Map of Prince Edward Island highlighting Lot 60
- Coordinates: 46°3′N 62°47′W
- Country: Canada
- Province: Prince Edward Island
- County: Queens County
- Parish: St. John's Parish

Area
  - Total: 31.95 sq mi (82.76 km^{2})

Population (2006)
  - Total: 319
  - Density: 10/sq mi (3.9/km^{2})
- Time zone: UTC-4 (AST)
  - Summer (DST): UTC-3 (ADT)
- Canadian Postal code: C0A
- Area code: 902
- NTS Map: 011L02
- GNBC Code: BAESU

Lot 60 is a township in Queens County, Prince Edward Island, Canada. It is part of St. John's Parish. In the 1767 land lottery, Lot 60 was awarded to Major John Wrightson and Captain Daniel Shaw of the 42nd Regiment of Foot.

According to the Canada 2001 Census:

- Population: 320
- % Change (1996-2001): -3.6
- Dwellings: 153
- Area (km².): 82.76
- Density (persons per km².): 3.9

== Communities ==
- Caledonia
- Culloden
- Flat River
- Lewes
- Melleville
- Pinette South
- Roseberry
- Selkirk Road
