= Parish (administrative division) =

Administrative non-ecclesiastical division

A parish is an administrative division used by several countries. To distinguish it from an ecclesiastical parish, the term civil parish is used in some jurisdictions, as noted below.

The table below lists countries which use this administrative division:

Country or territory		Local name	Notes
Andorra		Parròquia	
Antigua and Barbuda		Parish	
Australia		Parish	Official use of parishes is done on a state-by-state basis Qld: Prior to the digitisation and renumbering of the cadastre of Queensland parishes were used on title documents. While they have never officially been abolished, they are no longer used except in historical contexts. NSW: Utilised. Vic: Utilised. Tas: Used until the 20th century, when they were renamed to land districts. SA: Uses hundreds instead NT: Uses hundreds instead WA: Not utilised. ACT: Not used since the establishment of the Territory
Barbados		Parish	
Bermuda		Parish	
Canada	New Brunswick	Civil Parish	Subdivision of counties; current basis for rural census subdivisions. Formerly a governance unit.
Canada	Prince Edward Island	Parish	
Canada	Quebec	Parish municipality	
China	Macau	Freguesia / 堂區	
Dominica		Parish	
Ecuador		Parroquia	
Estonia		Vald	
Grenada		Parish	
Guernsey		Parish	
Ireland		Civil parish	In the Republic of Ireland, civil parishes continue to exist for statutory purposes only.
Jamaica		Parish	
Jersey		Parish	
Latvia		Pagasts	
Isle of Man		Parish	
Montserrat		Parish	
(Nordic countries)		Municipality	In Nordic countries, a rural administrative parish corresponds to the concept of socken or sogn, a predecessor to today's municipalities of Sweden, Finland, Norway and Denmark.
Portugal		Freguesia	
Saint Kitts and Nevis		Parish	
Saint Vincent and the Grenadines		Parish	
Spain	(Asturias, Galicia)	Parroquia	
United Kingdom	England	Civil parish	In all parts of the British Isles except Scotland and Wales, it is known as a civil parish to distinguish it from the ecclesiastical parish. In England, a (civil) parish council may choose to rename itself as a town council or as a community council. In Northern Ireland, civil parishes continue to exist for statutory purposes only.
United Kingdom	Northern Ireland	Civil parish	In all parts of the British Isles except Scotland and Wales, it is known as a civil parish to distinguish it from the ecclesiastical parish. In England, a (civil) parish council may choose to rename itself as a town council or as a community council. In Northern Ireland, civil parishes continue to exist for statutory purposes only.
United Kingdom	Scotland (formerly)	Civil parish	In all parts of the British Isles except Scotland and Wales, it is known as a civil parish to distinguish it from the ecclesiastical parish. In England, a (civil) parish council may choose to rename itself as a town council or as a community council. In Northern Ireland, civil parishes continue to exist for statutory purposes only.
United Kingdom	Scotland	Community	
United Kingdom	Wales	Community	
United States	Louisiana	Parish	The term "county" is used in 48 US states, while Louisiana and Alaska have functionally equivalent subdivisions called parishes and boroughs respectively.
United States	South Carolina (formerly)	Parish	Until the late 19th century, the South Carolina Lowcountry was divided into parishes. Today all of South Carolina is divided into counties.
Venezuela		Parroquia	

== See also ==
- Muban
