= Pikogan =

- Indian reserve
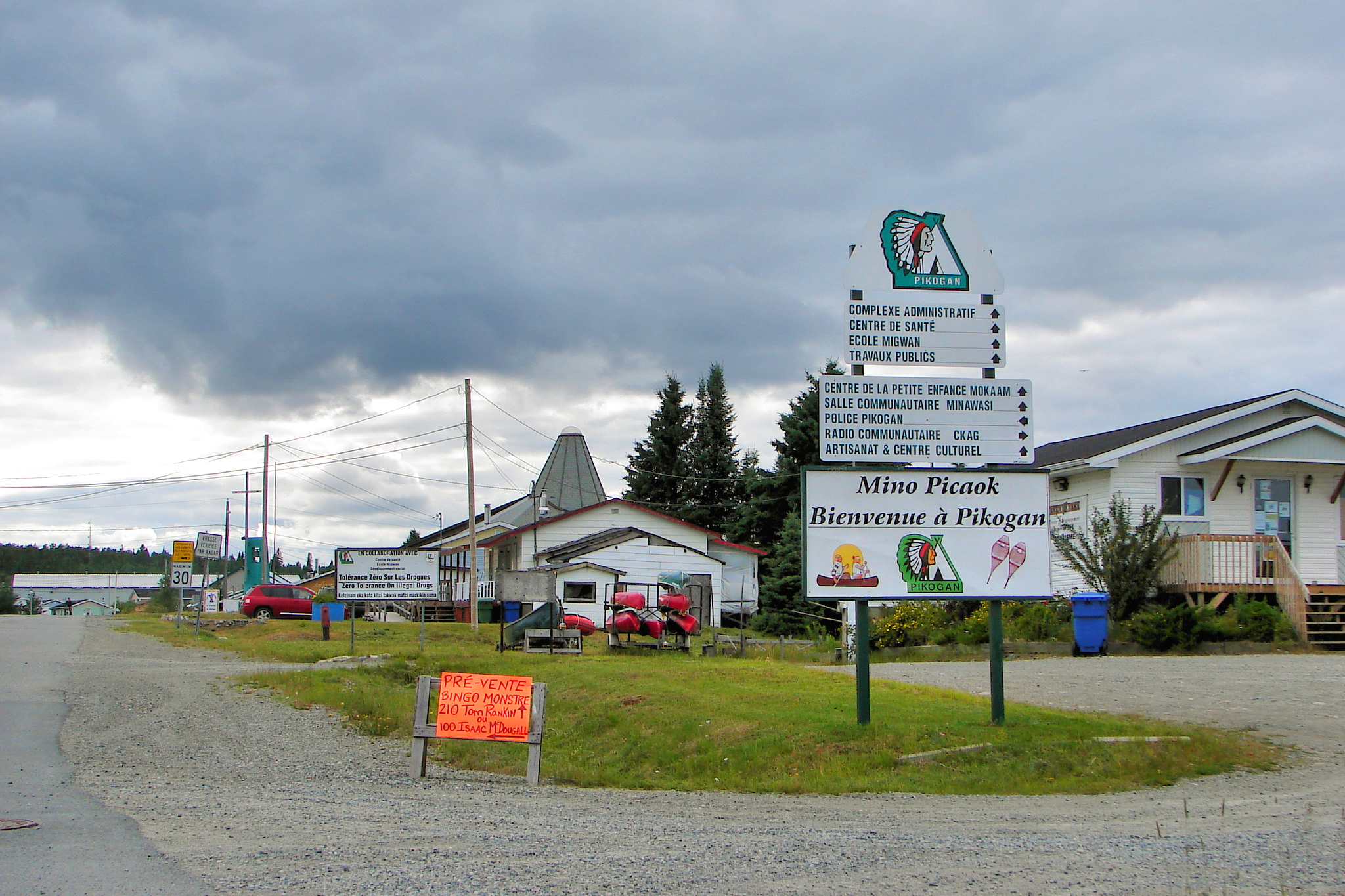

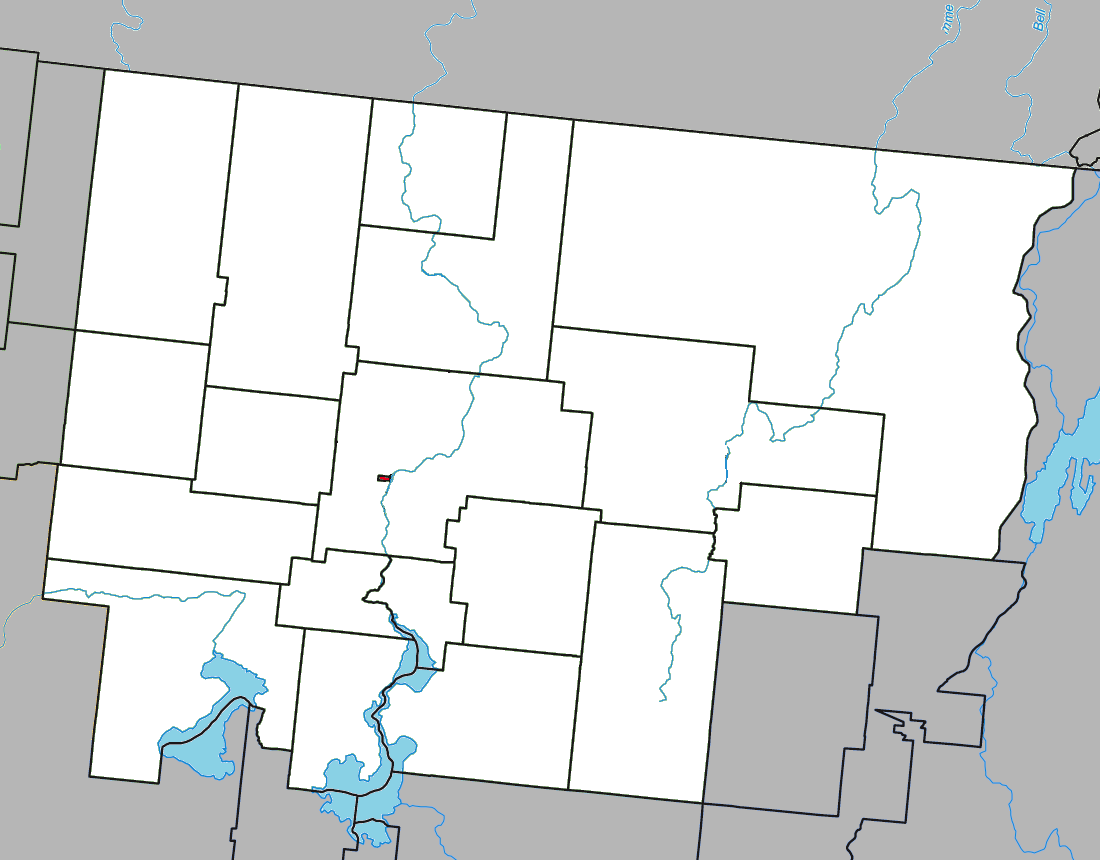
- Location within Abitibi RCM.

- Location in Abitibi-Témiscamingue
- Coordinates: 48°35′49″N 78°7′00″W
- Country: Canada
- Province: Quebec
- Region: Abitibi-Témiscamingue
- RCM: None

Government
  - Chief: Chantal Kistabish
  - Federal riding: Abitibi—Témiscamingue
  - Prov. riding: Abitibi-Ouest

Area
  - Land: 1 km^{2} (0.39 sq mi)

Population (2021)
  - Total: 540
- Time zone: UTC−05:00 (EST)
  - Summer (DST): UTC−04:00 (EDT)

Pikogan is an Indian reserve in Abitibi-Témiscamingue, Quebec, inhabited by members of the Abitibiwinni First Nation.

The reserve had a population of 540 in the Canada 2021 Census. It is part of the census agglomeration of Amos. Pikogan is bordered by the Harricana River.

The official establishment of the Pikogan reserve dates to 13 March 1956 on lands acquired by the Government of Quebec. The village's construction began on March 10, 1958. Pikogan's surface measures one square kilometre.

== See also ==
- List of anglophone communities in Quebec
