= Lot 40, Prince Edward Island =

- Township
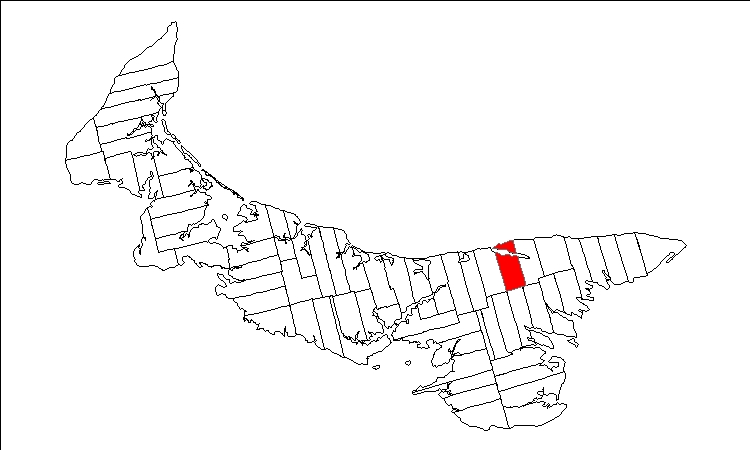
- Map of Prince Edward Island highlighting Lot 40
- Coordinates: 46°23′N 62°39′W
- Country: Canada
- Province: Prince Edward Island
- County: Kings County,
- Parish: St. Patrick's Parish

Area
  - Total: 29.59 sq mi (76.63 km^{2})

Population (2006)
  - Total: 477
  - Urban density: 16/sq mi (6.2/km^{2})
- Time zone: UTC-4 (AST)
  - Summer (DST): UTC-3 (ADT)
- Canadian Postal code: C0A
- Area code: 902
- NTS Map: 011L07
- GNBC Code: BAESA

Lot 40 is a township in Kings County, Prince Edward Island, Canada. It is part of St. Patrick's Parish. Lot 40 was awarded to Lieutenant George Burns and merchants George Spence and John Mills in the 1767 land lottery.
