= Lot 50, Prince Edward Island =

- Township
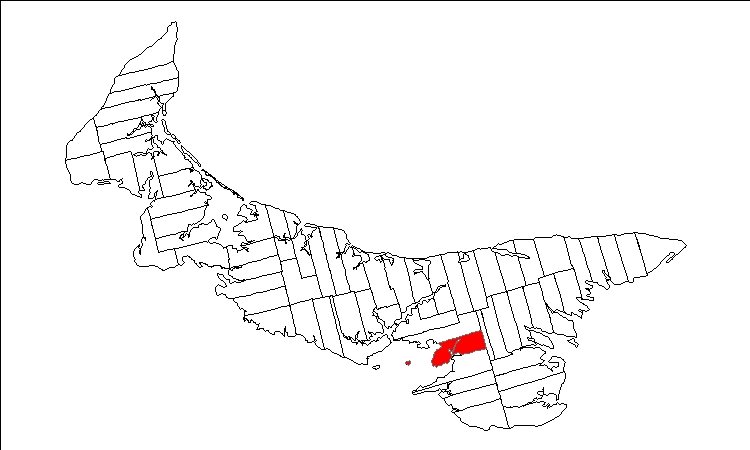
- Map of Prince Edward Island highlighting Lot 50
- Coordinates: 46°10′N 62°52′W
- Country: Canada
- Province: Prince Edward Island
- County: Queens County,
- Parish: St. John's Parish

Area
  - Total: 31.80 sq mi (82.36 km^{2})

Population (2006)
  - Total: 853
  - Density: 27/sq mi (10.4/km^{2})
- Time zone: UTC-4 (AST)
  - Summer (DST): UTC-3 (ADT)
- Canadian Postal code: C0A
- Area code: 902
- NTS Map: 011L02
- GNBC Code: BAESK

Lot 50 is a township in Queens County, Prince Edward Island, Canada. It is part of St. John's Parish. Lot 50 was awarded to Henry Gladwin and Captain Peter Innes in the 1767 land lottery. One quarter of the lot was granted to Loyalists in 1783.
