= Lord Selkirk Provincial Park =

Provincial park of Prince Edward Island, Canada

Coordinates: 46°5′30.8″N 62°54′21.6″W

Lord Selkirk Provincial Park is a provincial park in Prince Edward Island, Canada. The park hosts a community-operated campground and playground. It is adjacent to the Belfast Highland Greens golf course, in addition to a pool and a canteen.
