= Scotchfort 4 =

Coordinates: 46°21′45″N 62°54′32″W

Scotchfort 4 in Prince Edward Island

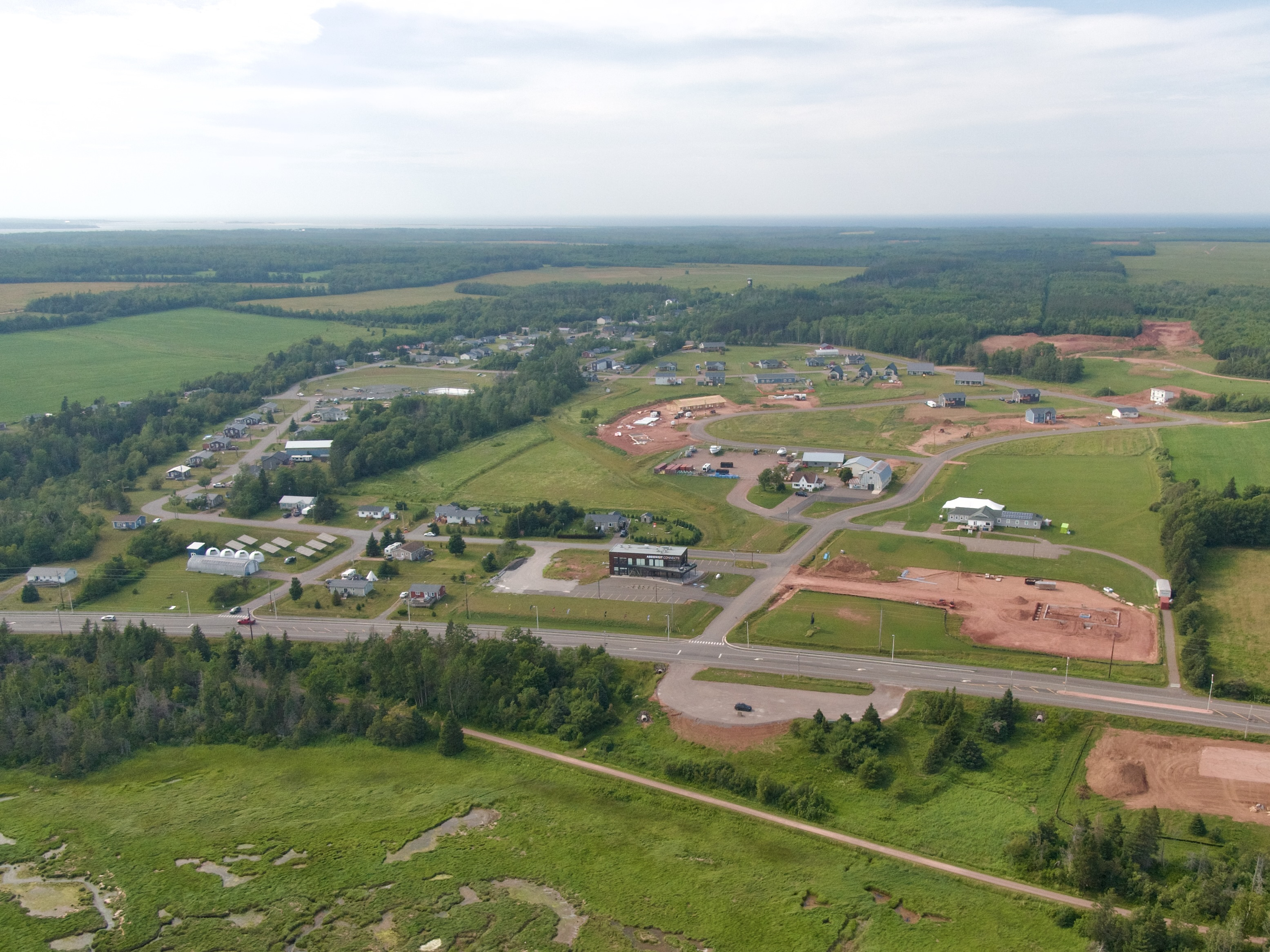
Abegweit First Nation reserve

Scotchfort 4 is a Mi'kmaq reserve located in Queens County, Prince Edward Island. In the 2016 Census, the reserve had 200 residents.

Scotchfort 4 is located in the community of Scotchfort on the north bank of the Hillsborough River, approximately 4 km (2.5 mi) west of Mount Stewart.

It is administratively part of the Abegweit First Nation.
