= St. Patrick's (civil parish, Prince Edward Island) =

Coordinates: 46°24′52.1″N 62°41′31″W

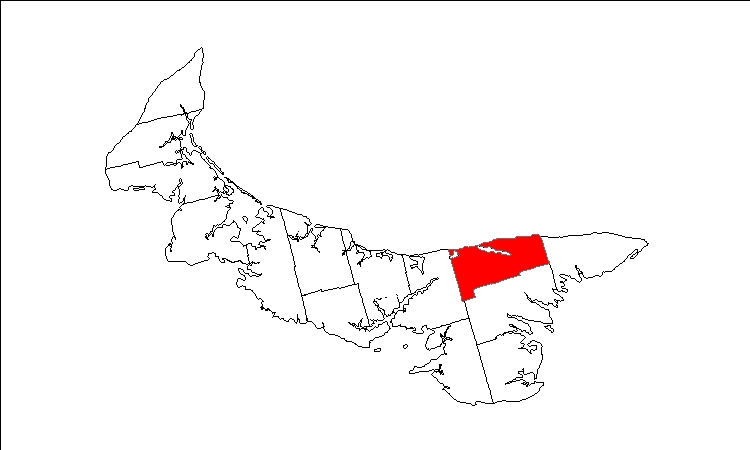

St. Patrick's Parish was created as a civil parish in Kings County, Prince Edward Island, Canada, during the 1764–1766 survey of Samuel Holland.

It contains the following townships:

- Lot 38
- Lot 39
- Lot 40
- Lot 41
- Lot 42
