= Chiniguchi Waterway Provincial Park =

Wilderness park in Ontario, Canada

- IUCN category II (national park)
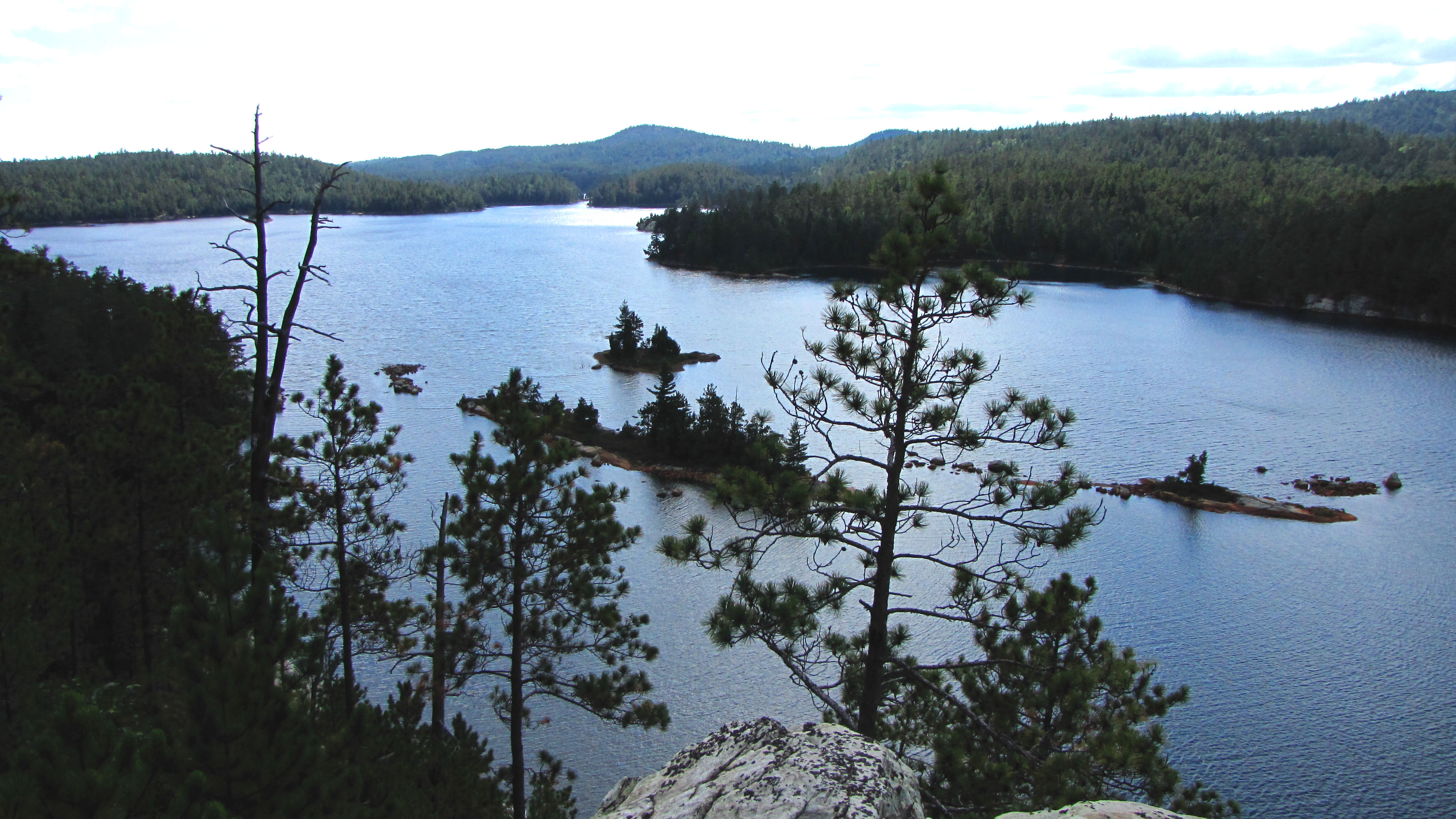
- View of Wolf Lake

- Location within Ontario
- Location: Sudbury District, Ontario, Canada
- Nearest city: Sudbury, Ontario
- Coordinates: 46°50′N 80°33′W
- Area: 9,368 ha (36.17 sq mi)
- Established: 2006
- Governing body: Ontario Parks

The Chiniguchi Waterway Provincial Park consists of 9,368 ha (36.17 sq mi) of protected wilderness along the Chiniguchi River, Maskinonge Lake, Kukagami Lake, Wolf Lake and Matagamasi Lake in the Sudbury District of Ontario, that includes 336 hectares of Forest Reserve. The park is one of the several provincial parks located in the Sudbury area. It is managed by Ontario Parks. It contains the largest stand of old growth Red Pines.

This river is only suitable for backcountry canoeists; there are no facilities in the park. Canoeists should be able to portage.

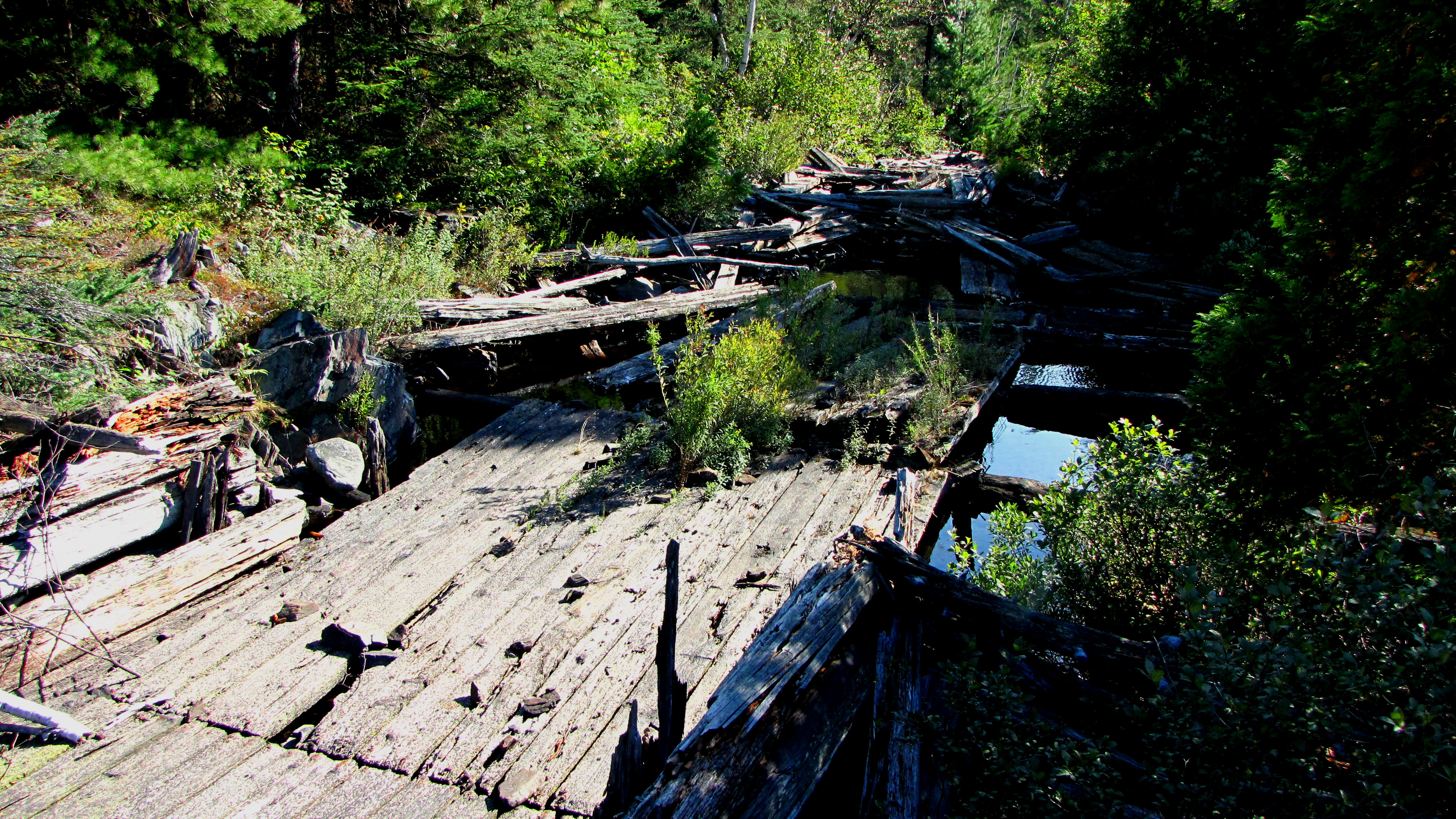
Logging chute

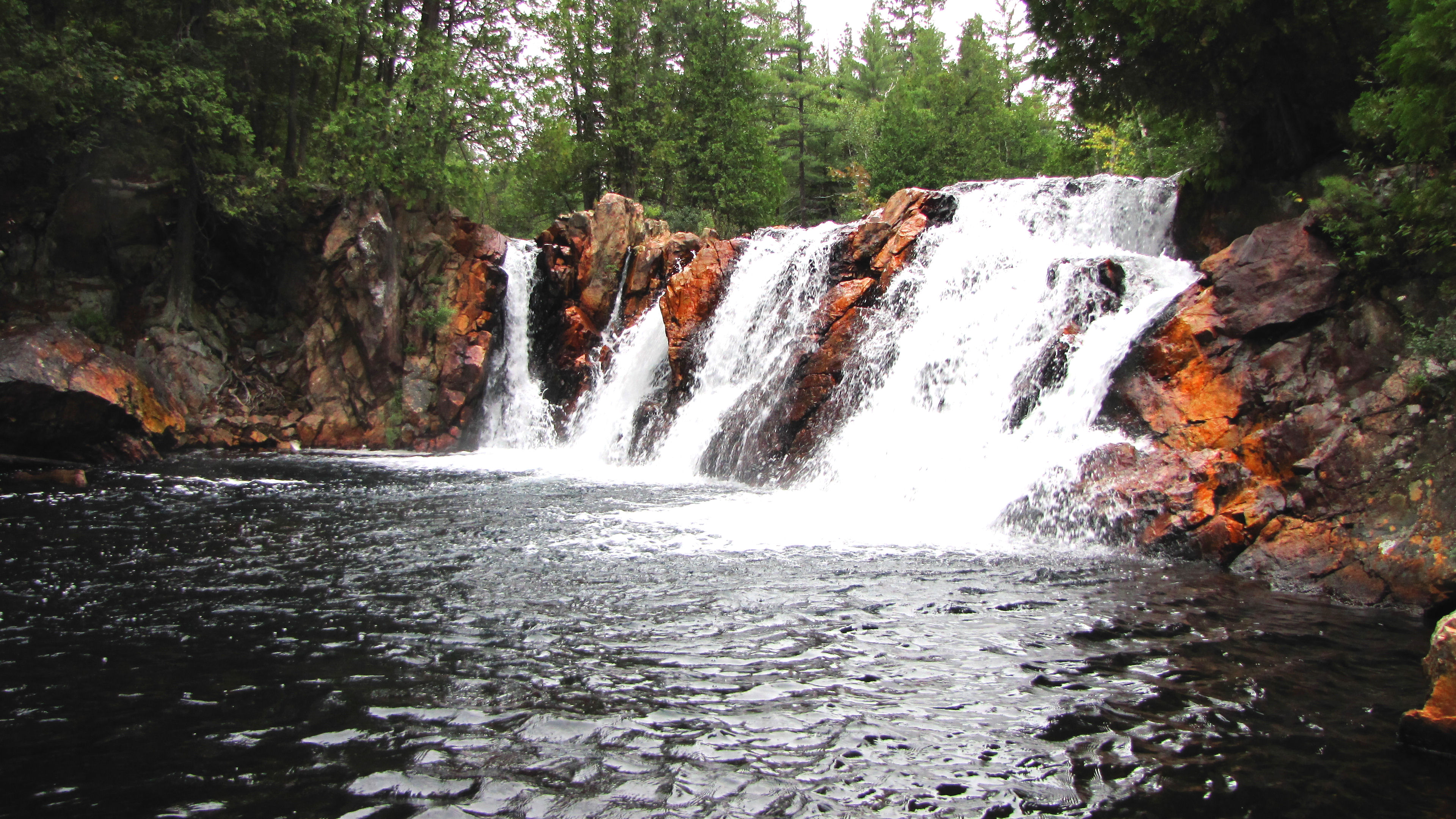
Falls at Paradise Lagoon

== Wolf Lake Forest Reserve ==
The Wolf Lake Forest Reserve contains the world's largest remaining old-growth red pine forest; containing trees up to 300 years old.
