= Abegweit First Nation =

First Nations government on Prince Edward Island, Canada

Coordinates: 46°21′23″N 62°54′21.5″W

- Band No. 1
- Mi'kmaq
- Abegweit First Nation logo
- People: Mi'kmaq
- Headquarters: 11222 St. Peters Rd., Scotchfort, PE, C0A 1T0

Land
- Main reserve: Scotchfort 4
- Reserves: Morell 2; Rocky Point 3
- Land area: 1.91821 km^{2} (0.74063 sq mi)

Population (March 2025)
- On reserve: 227
- On other land: 13
- Off reserve: 179
- Total population: 419

Government
- Chief: Roderick W. Gould, Jr.
- Council size: 4
- Council: Sheri Bernard; Chris Jadis; Jacob Jadis

Tribal Council
- Epekwitk Assembly of Councils, Inc.

Website
- abegweit.ca

Abegweit First Nation is a First Nations government located on Prince Edward Island, Canada.

Originally part of Lennox Island First Nation, its headquarters is at Scotchfort, known as Skaqmk. This is the location of a historic Míkmaq portage route connecting Mimtugaak (on the Hillsborough River) to Kadotpichk (on Savage Harbour). This First Nation comprises three reserves: Morell 2, Rocky Point 3 and Scotchfort 4.

== Reserves ==
The Abegweit First Nation comprises the following reserves:

Abegweit First Nation Reserves
Community	Area	Location	Date established
Morell 2	74.10 hectares (183 acres)	38.4 km. northeast of Charlottetown	1846
Rocky Point 3	4.90 hectares (12 acres)	south of Charlottetown harbor	October 3, 1913
Scotchford 4	113.10 hectares (279 acres)	24 km. northeast of Charlottetown	prior to 1867

Throughout the years, the population has steadily increased, rising from 240 registered people in 2016 to 402 registered people in December, 2022. These locations and areas are as of December 2021.

== History ==
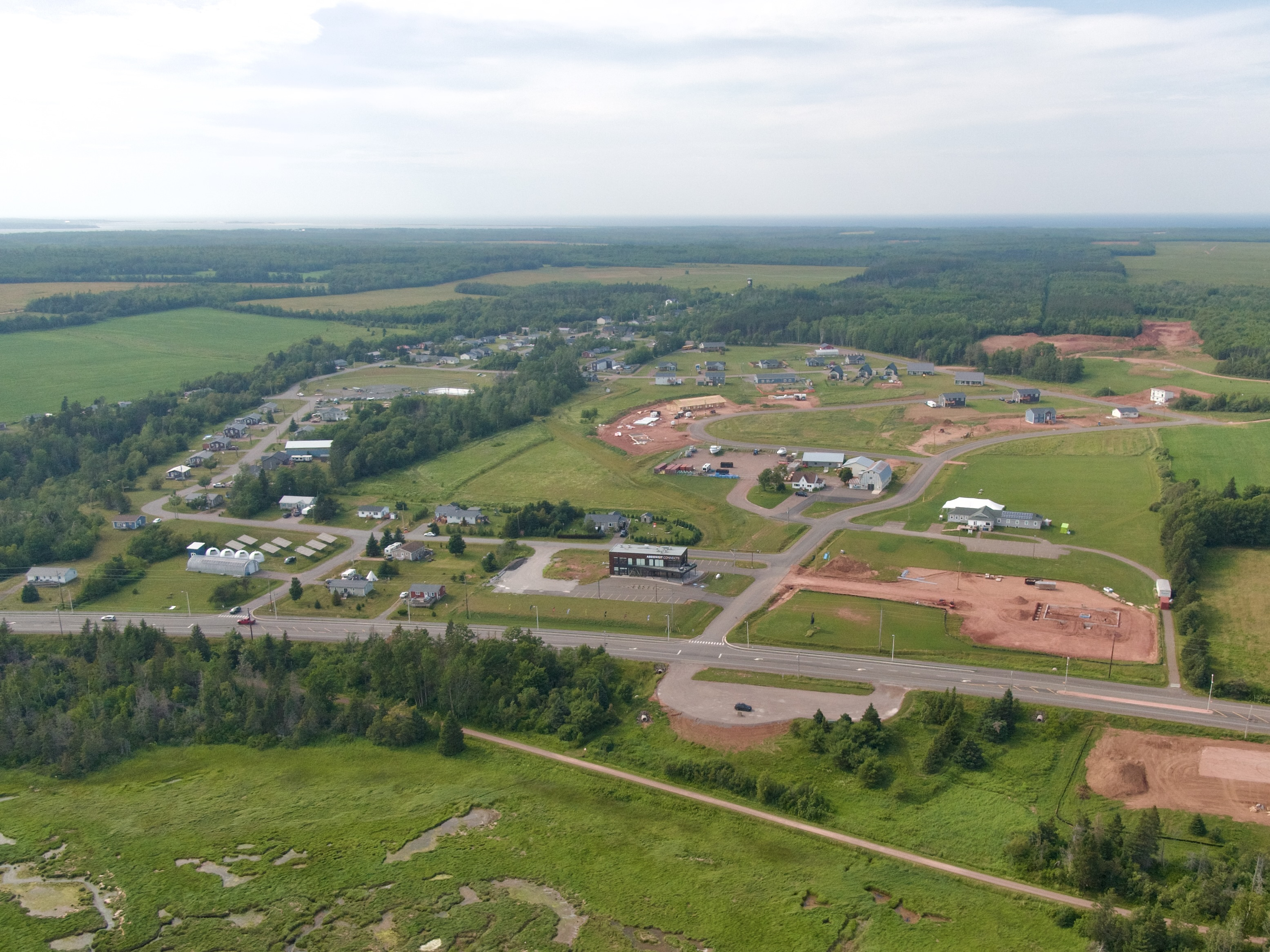
Headquarters in Scotchfort 4

The Abegweit First Nation was established on March 7, 1972. The name Abegweit is the widely known Anglicization of Epekwitk, the original word taken from the Mi'kmaq language for Prince Edward Island. Abegweit means "Cradle on the Waves" which is fitting with its location off of the Gulf of St. Lawrence.

=== Separation from Lennox Island First Nation ===
There are four reserves on Prince Edward Island, three of which are owned by the Abegweit First Nation. Before 1972, all four reserves and people living there were considered a part of the Lennox Island First Nation. Due to distance between the reserves and conflicts with the Council of the Lennox Island First Nation, it was decided that the Abegweit First Nation should be formed. Morell, Rocky Point, and Scotchfort reserves were then held by the Abegweit First Nation after a vote on March 7, 1972. The 279 acre (113.10 hectare) Scotchfort Reserve 4 was created and like all reserves on Prince Edward Island, was administered as part of the Lennox Island First Nation until separating in 1972. Soon after the separation on May 17, 1972, the first election was held appointing a chief and two councillors. The Abegweit First Nation amalgamated the three reserves in the eastern part of the province in the 1990s.

=== Tribal Council ===
The Epekwitk Assembly of Councils was formed in 2019 and serves as the joint communication between the Lennox First Nation and Abegweit First Nation. This council is run by both Chiefs and Councils from both nations in an effort to develop different aspects of each of the First Nation's life ranging from government to economic development. There are three sub organizations that stem from the Epekwitk Assembly of Councils - Mi'kmaq Confederacy of PEI, L'nuey, and Epekwitk Development.

Epekwitk Assembly of Councils Sub Organizations
Organization	Focus
Mi'kmaq Confederacy of PEI	Shared services and programs for the First Nations/PEI Indigenous Community + Technical Advisory Services for the First Nation Council
L'nuey	Protection and implementation of Epekwitk Mi'kmaq Aboriginal and Treaty rights
Epekwitk Development	Shared economic development interests and the creation of first nation's source revenue

=== Native language ===
The native language of the people is Mi'kmaq. The Indian Act almost eliminated this language entirely; however, the Mi'kmaq language is now taught in schools and Mi'kmaq culture is heavily incorporated into mainstream events.

=== Traditions ===
==== Principles and philosophies ====
- "Netukulimk" - taking what you need and leaving the rest for the next generations

This principle was practiced daily in hunting traditions, recreational activities, and expansion. Abegweit Mi'kmaq people only pick blueberries and cranberries despite the affluent variety of other berries that grow in the surrounding area. They see resources as a gift that should not be taken for granted. In order to have continual access to these resources, they believe that it is important to use them sparingly and preserve.

==== PowWow rituals ====
Every year, the Abegweit First Nation holds PowWows to join together and meet other people. Due to COVID-19 the Abegweit First Nation was unable to hold its annual PowWow for two years. In 2022, they were able to finally host its first large one in Scotchfort. Many people partook in this two-day celebration consisting of traditional dances, songs, and rituals. One traditional dance is the Blanket Dance. This dance is meant to help with any expenses acquired from hosting the celebration.

== Government ==
Abegweit is a custom band that is governed by 1 Chief and 3 Councillors that are elected every 4 years. The Abegweit First Nation is currently a part of Section 10 Band and uses as custom electoral system. The current chief is Roderick Walter Gould Jr who began his term in 2019.

As of 2018 and according to the Abegweit Comprehensive Community Plan, the Abegweit First Nation aims to promote informed decision making and focus on band involvement. Steps to implement these goals include developing a youth council and creating a Business Continuity Plan. Every year, the Councillors and other members meet to discuss the Strategic Operational Plan for projects, businesses, and programs.

== Economic development ==
Abegweit First Nation owns and operates a number of businesses, including Ultramar Epekwitk Gas Bar, a Robin's Donuts franchise, Red Stone Truck & Marine, and a commercial fishing fleet. Abegweit First Nation also houses Abegweit Biodiversity and Enhancement Hatchery, Abegweit Conservation Society, Abegweit Band Charities Inc and most recently, Epekwitk Gardens & Preserves.

=== Abegweit Biodiversity Enhancement Hatchery ===
The Abegweit Biodiversity Enhancement Hatchery was created in 2012 as an organization aimed to give back to the environment. Since its creation, the Abegweit Biodiversity Enhancement Hatchery focuses on preserving brook trout and Alaskan salmon which are both raised at the facility. Recreational fishing is also a big part of the Abegweit First Nation's economy, bringing in $7 million in revenue. In order to maintain this source of income, the Abegweit First Nation has prioritized educating younger generations about the importance of preserving the Hatchery.

The Hatchery has grown since its initial launch, releasing over a million fish back into the streams as of 2022. This process includes taking stock from rivers and incubating the eggs for about six months until they hatch. Once the fish are fully developed, they are released back into the streams they were originally from.

=== Community Economic Development Program ===
Currently, the Abegweit First Nation has a Community Economic Development Program (CEDP) which focuses on further developing the community through various services. Some of these services include proposal development, community economic planning, land and resource development, and research for new projects. This program allows businesses to partner with different organizations on and off the reserve.
