= 78th Fraser Highlanders =

78th Regiment of Foot
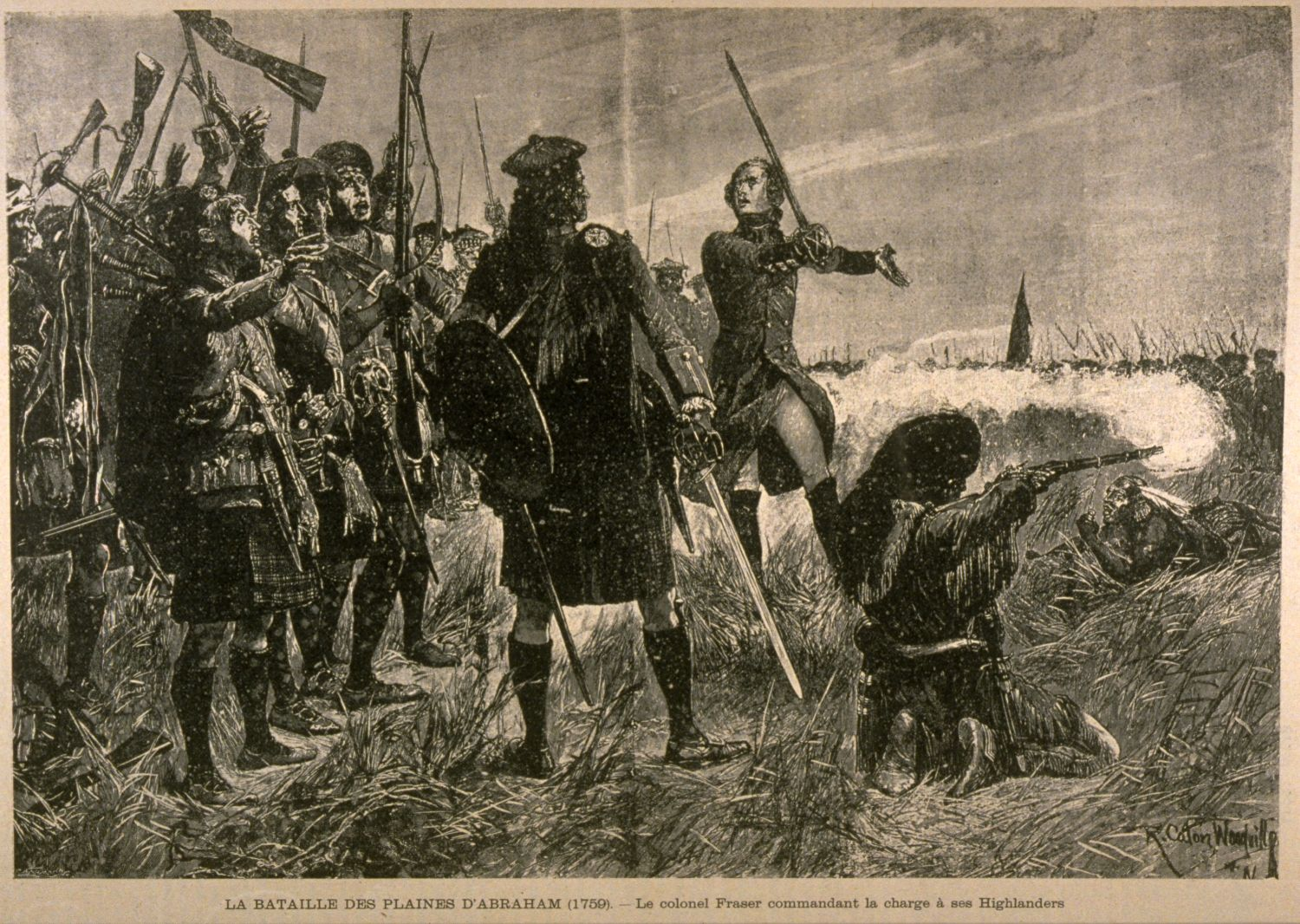
- 19th century romantic depiction of Fraser's Regiment at the Battle of the Plains of Abraham.
- Active: 1757–1763
- Country: Kingdom of Great Britain
- Branch: British Army
- Type: Infantry
- Nickname: Fraser's Highlanders
- Motto: Je suis prest
- Colors: White or Buff facings
- Engagements: French and Indian War

Commanders
- Notable commanders: Simon Fraser of Lovat

The 78th Regiment, (Highland) Regiment of Foot, also known as the 78th Fraser Highlanders, was a British infantry regiment of the line that was raised in Scotland in 1757 to fight in the Seven Years' War (also known as the French and Indian War in the US.). The 78th Regiment was one of the first three Highland Regiments to fight in North America.

== History ==
The regiment was raised in Inverness by Lieutenant-Colonel Simon Fraser of Lovat as the 2nd Highland Battalion and ranked as the 62nd Regiment of Foot in 1757. It was re-ranked as the 63rd Regiment of Foot later in the year.

The regiment embarked for Halifax, Nova Scotia in July 1757 to take part in the Seven Years' War. Having been renamed the 78th (Highland) Regiment of Foot, or Fraser's Highlanders in June 1758, it took part in the Siege of Louisbourg later that month, the Battle of the Plains of Abraham in September 1759 and the Montreal Campaign in August 1760. It was at the Battle of the Plains of Abraham that the 78th led the rest of the British forces in a charge against the retreating French. The 78th's portion of the charge is notable as the last known successful Highland Charge in history. During the war, the regiment suffered 103 soldiers killed and 383 wounded.

The regiment was disbanded in Quebec in December 1763, with each man offered a grant of land if he stayed in Canada. Of those who accepted the offer, more than 300 joined the 84th Royal Highland Emigrants when it was raised in 1775.

== Colonels ==
Colonels of the regiment were:

- 1757–1761 Lieutenant-Colonel Simon Fraser of Lovat
- 1761–1763 Major John Campbell of Ballimore

== See also ==
- 78th Fraser Highlanders Pipe Band, a pipe band from Campbellville, Ontario (in the Toronto area) with the same name but with no affiliation to the regiment
- 71st Regiment of Foot, Fraser's Highlanders, a later regiment also raised by Simon Fraser of Lovat but for the American Revolutionary War
