= History of Nova Scotia =

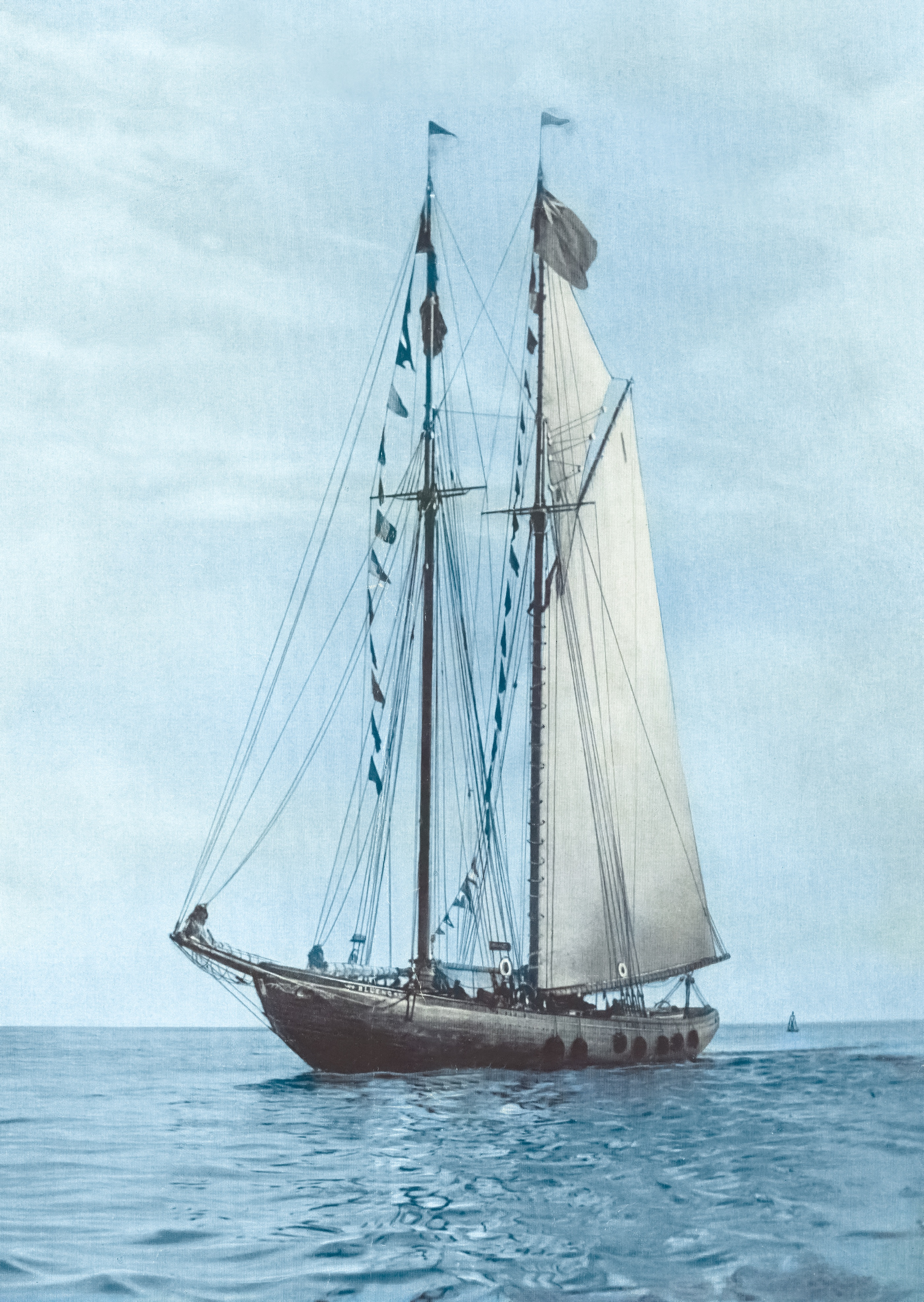
The Bluenose is a provincial icon of Nova Scotia and was an important Canadian symbol in the 1930s

Prior to European colonization, the lands encompassing present-day Nova Scotia (also historically referred to as Mi'kma'ki and Acadia) were inhabited by the Mi'kmaq people. During the first 150 years of European settlement, the region was claimed by France and a colony formed, primarily made up of Catholic Acadians and Mi'kmaq. This time period involved six wars in which the Mi'kmaq along with the French and some Acadians resisted British control of the region: the French and Indian Wars, Father Rale's War (1722-1725), and Father Le Loutre's War(1749-1755). During Father Le Loutre's War, the capital was moved from Annapolis Royal, Nova Scotia, to the newly established Halifax, Nova Scotia (1749). The warfare ended with the Burying the Hatchet ceremony (1761). After the colonial wars, New England Planters and Foreign Protestants immigrated to Nova Scotia in the 1760s. During and after the American War of Independence (1775-1783), both white and black Loyalists migrated to the colony. With American independence, British North America came into being. The huge influx of American Loyalists swelled the population of Nova Scotia, which the crown divided, creating New Brunswick in 1784. In the nineteenth century, Nova Scotia became self-governing in 1848 and joined the Canadian Confederation in 1867.

The boundaries of Nova Scotia shifted during the eighteenth century, and included the present-day Canadian Maritime provinces and northern Maine (see Sunbury County, Nova Scotia), all of which were at one time part of Nova Scotia. In 1763 Cape Breton Island and St. John's Island (what is now Prince Edward Island) became part of Nova Scotia. In 1769, St. John's Island became a separate colony. Nova Scotia included present-day New Brunswick until that province was established in 1784, after the influx of British Loyalist refugees, following the British defeat in the American War of Independence.^{A}

== Early history ==
Research on the prehistory of the region indicates that the glaciers began their retreat from in the Maritimes approximately 13,500 years ago, with final deglaciation, isostatic rebound, and sea level fluctuation ending and leaving the New England-Maritimes region virtually ice free 11,000 years ago. The earliest evidence of Palaeo-Indian settlement in the region follows rapidly after deglaciation. Evidence of settlement found in the Debert Palaeo-Indian Site dates to 10,600 before present, though settlement seems likely to have occurred earlier, following large game animals such as the caribou as they expanded into the land revealed by the retreating glaciers. The record of continuous habitation through the paleo and archaic period over ten thousand years culminated in the development of the culture, traditions, and language now known as the Mi’kmaq.

=== Mi'kmaq ===
For several thousand years, the territory of the province has been a part of the territory of the Mi'kmaq country of Mi'kma'ki. Mi'kma'ki includes what is now the Maritimes, parts of Maine, Newfoundland and the Gaspé Peninsula. The Mi'kmaq lived in an annual cycle of seasonal movement between living in dispersed interior winter camps and larger coastal communities during the summer. The climate was unfavourable for agriculture, and small semi-nomadic bands of a few matrilineality related families subsisted on fishing and hunting.

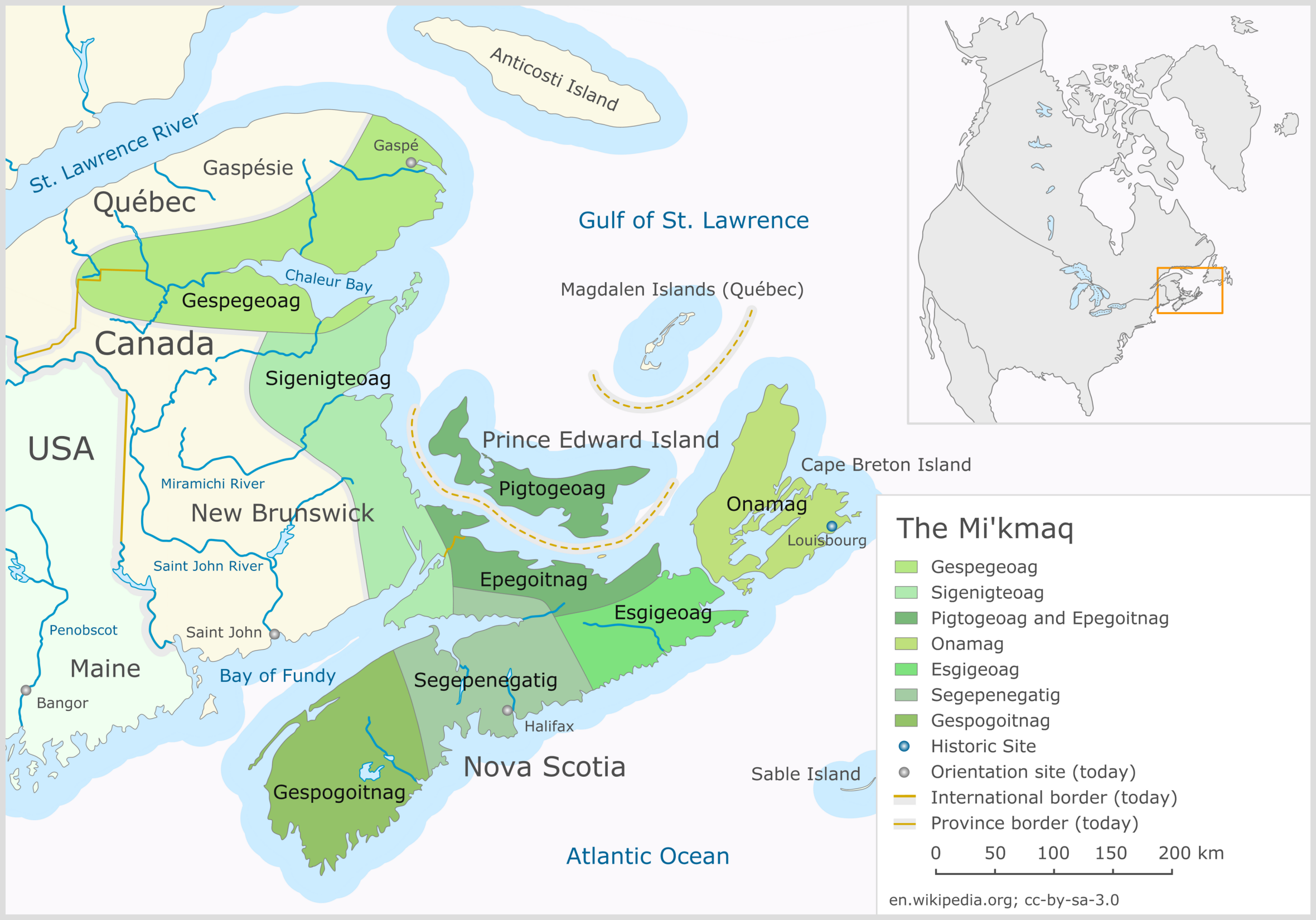
Settlement areas of the Mi'kmaq in Miꞌkmaꞌki, which emcompassed present-day Nova Scotia

The Mi'kmaq were governed by the Santé Mawiómi (Grand Council), led by the Kji-saqmaw (Grand council leader) and composed of the seven Nikanus (District Chiefs), Kji-Keptin (Grand Captain, or war chief) as well a Putús (recorder/secretary). Mi'kma'ki was divided into seven largely sovereign districts, each governed by a Nikanus and council of Sagamaw (local band chiefs), Elders, and other worthy community leaders. The district council enacting laws, ensured justice, apportioning fishing and hunting grounds, made war and sued for peace. Local bands were led by a Sagamaw and council of Elders and consisted of several extended family units.

The Mi'kmaq people inhabited region at the time the first European colonists arrived. Mi'kmaq territory was the first portion of North America that Europeans exploited at length for resource extraction. Early European fishermen salted their catch at sea and sailed directly home with it. But they set up camps ashore as early as 1520 for dry-curing cod. During the second half of the century, dry curing became the preferred preservation method. The local Mi'kmaq peoples began trading with European fishermen when the fishermen began landing in their territories as early as the 1520s. In about 1521–22, the Portuguese under João Álvares Fagundes established a fishing colony, believed to be on the island of Cape Breton. Though its fate is unknown, it is mentioned as late as 1570. By 1578 some 350 European ships were operating around the Saint Lawrence estuary. Most were independent fishermen, but increasing numbers were exploring the fur trade.

On June 24, 1610, Grand Chief Membertou converted to Catholicism and was baptized. A Concordat, or treaty, was signed between the Grand Council and the Pope protecting French settlers and priests and affirmed the right of Mi'kmaq to choose either Catholicism or Mi'kmaq tradition. In signing the Concordat the Catholic church affirmed Mi’kmaq sovereignty as a Catholic nation.

=== European explorers ===
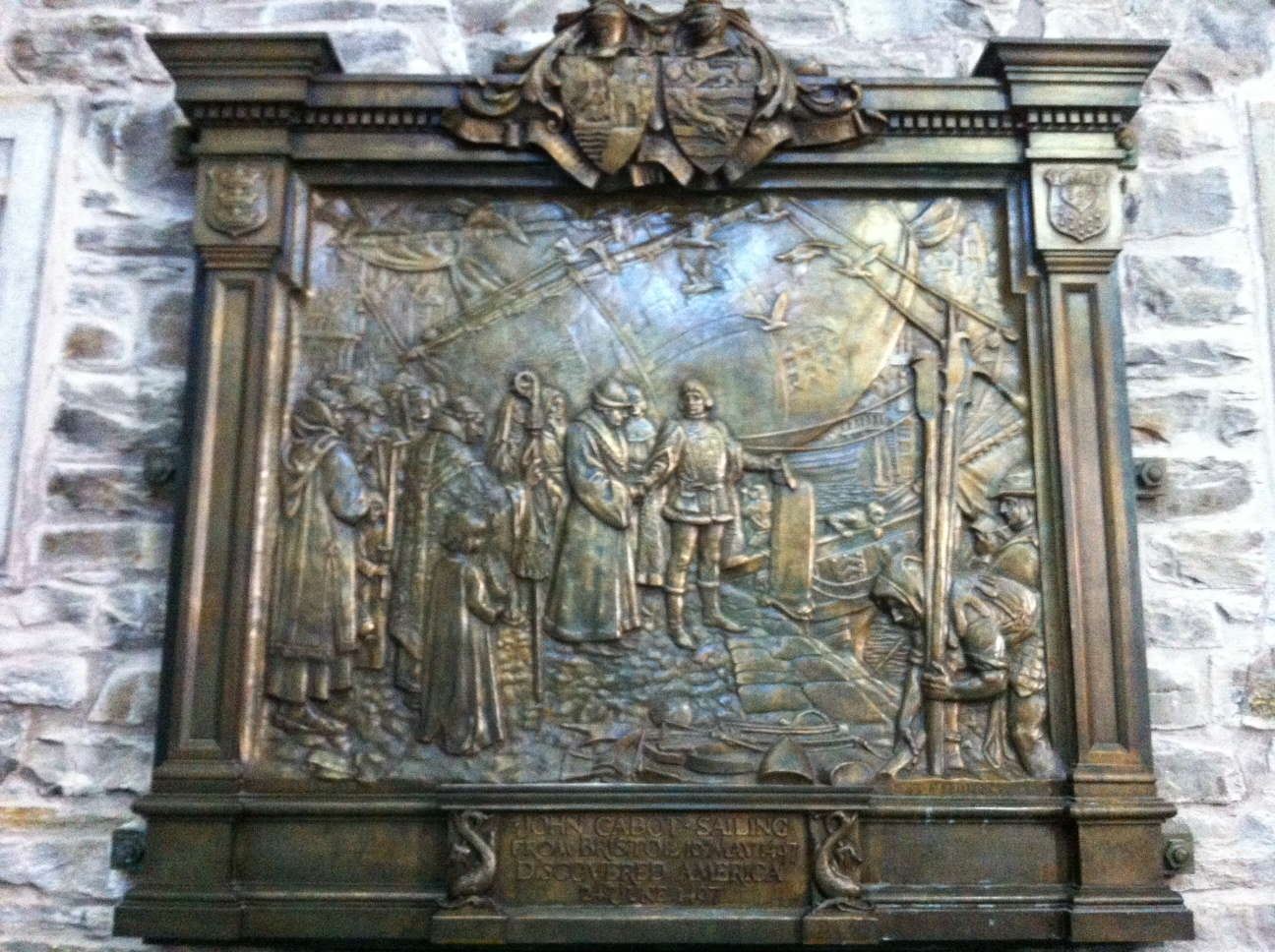
A plaque of John Cabot departing Bristol, England for Atlantic Canada (1497), installed at Sir Sandford Fleming Park, Halifax

Venetian Italian explorer Zuan Chabotto (Italian: Giovanni Caboto) known in English as John Cabot, was the first European explorer of the North American continent. His voyage of exploration ushered in an irrevocable transformation of global social and economic interaction. Cabot's voyage received financial backing by Italian banking houses in London and the Bardi family banking firm of Florence. With financing secure and patent issued by Henry VII to Cabot and his three sons, he set sail in 1496. Upon landing on 24 June 1497, Cabot raised the Venetian and Papal banners, claiming the land for the King of England and recognising the religious authority of the Roman Catholic Church. After this landing, Cabot spent some weeks "discovering the coast", with most "discovered after turning back." Cabot's expedition is believed to be the first by Europeans to mainland North America, since the Norsemen, established a settlement at L'Anse aux Meadows around the year 1014. Historian Alwyn Ruddock who worked on Cabot and his era for 35 years suggested Fr. Giovanni Antonio de Carbonariis and the other friars who accompanied Cabot's 1498 expedition had stayed in Newfoundland and founded a mission which would have made it the first Christian settlement on the continent. Nova Scotia was further explored by the Portuguese explorer João Álvares Fagundes (1520) as he searched south of his fishing settlements in Newfoundland.

== 17th century ==
During the Acadian period, the British made six attempts to conquer the colony by defeating the capital, ending with the defeat of the French in the Siege of Port Royal (1710). Over the following fifty years, the French and their allies made six unsuccessful military attempts to regain the capital.

=== French colonization and Acadia ===
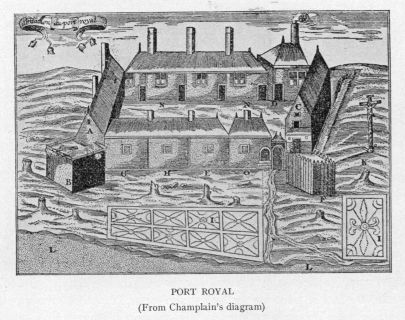
Depiction of habitation at Port Royal in 1612

In 1605, French colonists established the first permanent European settlement in the future Canada (and the first north of Florida) at Port Royal, founding what would become known as Acadia. The French, led by Pierre Dugua, Sieur de Monts established the first capital for the colony Acadia at Port Royal. Acadia (French: Acadie) was located in the northeastern region of North America comprising what is now the Canadian Maritime Provinces of New Brunswick, Nova Scotia, and Prince Edward Island, Gaspé, in Quebec, and to the Kennebec River in southern Maine.

=== Scottish colony (1629–1632) ===
By 1621, France had ceded territories including Port Royal and Acadia back to the British Crown. In that year King James I (James VI of Scotland) granted Sir William Alexander of Menstrie a charter to create the colony of Nova Scotia (“New Scotland”) which encompassed three Canadian provinces and portions of what is now Maine. The colony, whose capital, Charles Fort, was located at today's town of Annapolis Royal, lasted from 1629 to 1632 when the settlement was handed over to the French. Sir William's legacy, however, lives on in the form of the name, flag and arms of the modern Canadian province of Nova Scotia.

From 1629 to 1632, Nova Scotia briefly became a Scottish colony. William Alexander, the son of the Earl of Stirling of Menstrie Castle, Scotland claimed mainland Nova Scotia and settled at Charlesfort, at what would eventually be renamed Port Royal by the French. Lord Ochiltree claimed Île Royale (present-day Cape Breton Island) and settled at Baleine, Nova Scotia. There were three battles between the Scottish and the French: the Raid on St. John (1632), the Siege of Baleine (1629) as well as Siege of Cap de Sable (present-day Port La Tour, Nova Scotia) (1630). Nova Scotia was returned to France through a treaty. The French then established Fort Ste. Marie de Grace as the capital on the LaHave River before re-establishing Port Royal.

The French quickly defeated the Scottish at Baleine and established settlements on Île Royale at present-day Englishtown (1629) and St. Peter's (1630). These two settlements remained the only settlements on the island until they were abandoned by Nicolas Denys in 1659. Île Royale then remained without European occupants for more than fifty years until the communities were re-established when Louisbourg was established in 1713.

=== Further French settlement ===
There was a slow transition from trading (primarily involving male explorers and traders) to colonization. Ships began to arrive in 1632 that included women and children. The survival of the Acadian settlements was based on successful cooperation with the Indigenous peoples of the region.

=== Acadian Civil War (1640-1645) ===
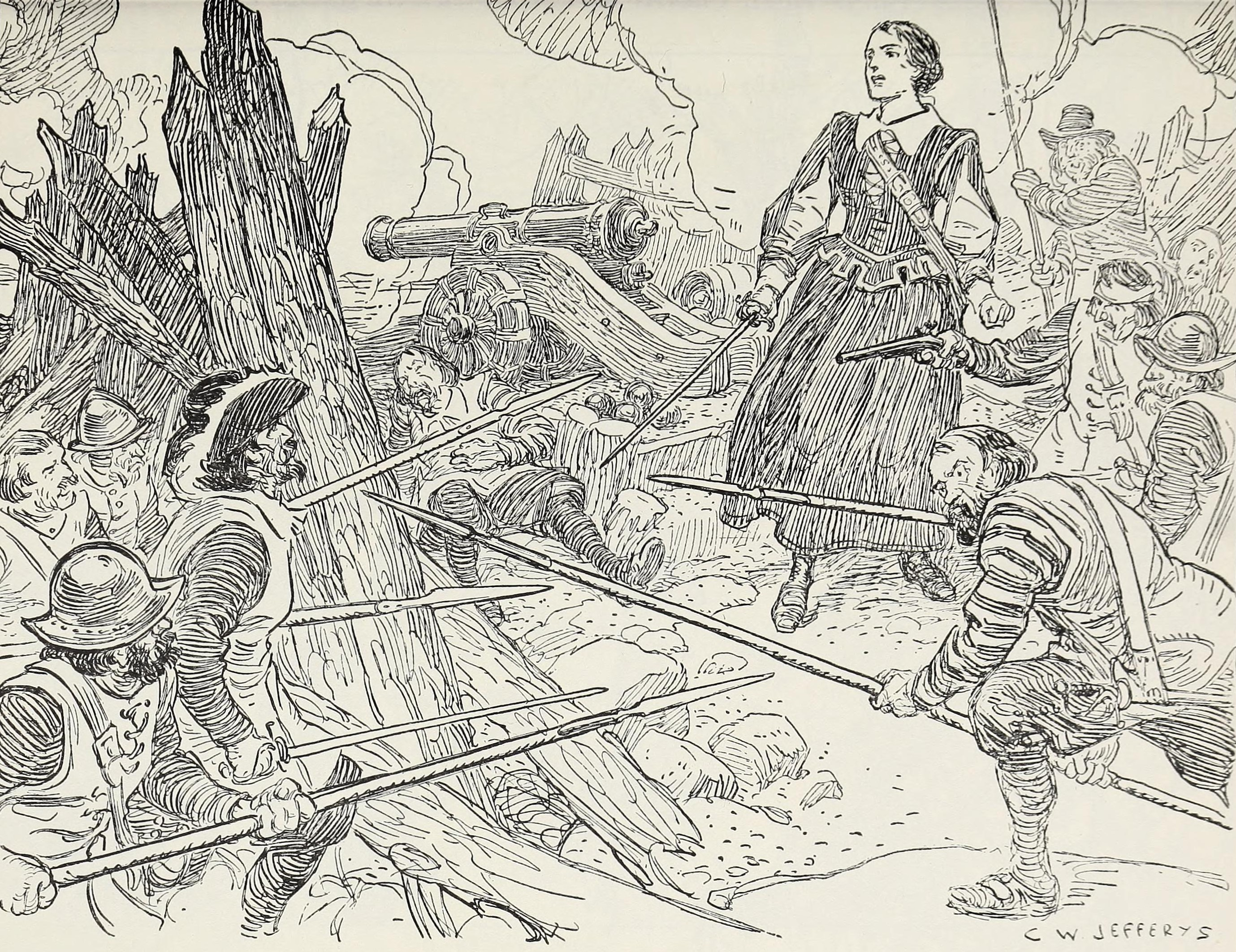
Depiction of Madame La Tour defending Fort Sainte Marie during the Acadian Civil War in 1645

Acadia was plunged into what some historians have described as a civil war in Acadia (1640–1645). The war was between Port Royal, where Governor of Acadia Charles de Menou d'Aulnay de Charnisay was stationed, and present-day Saint John, New Brunswick, where Governor of Acadia Charles de Saint-Étienne de la Tour was stationed.

In the war, there were four major battles. la Tour attacked d'Aulnay at Port Royal in 1640. In response to the attack, D'Aulnay sailed out of Port Royal to establish a five-month blockade of La Tour's fort at Saint John, which La Tour eventually defeated (1643). La Tour attacked d'Aulnay again at Port Royal in 1643. d'Aulnay and Port Royal ultimately won the war against La Tour with the 1645 siege of Saint John. After d'Aulnay died (1650), La Tour re-established himself in Acadia.

=== English colony (1654–1670) ===
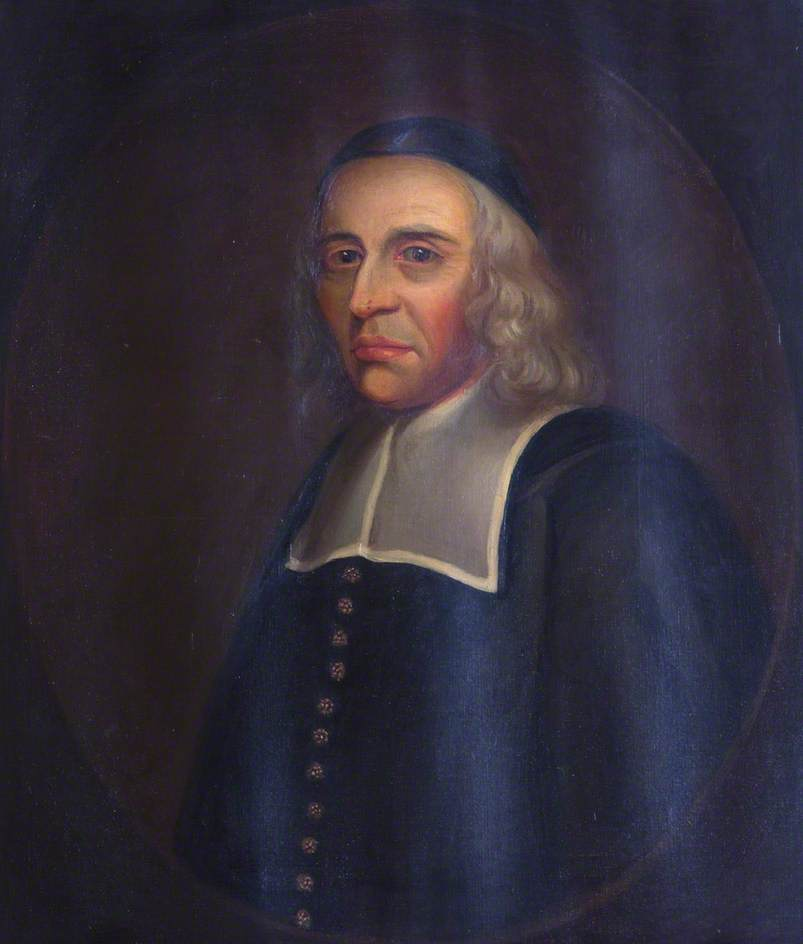
John Leverett, who launched an expedition against Acadia in 1654

In 1654, an English colonial expedition was launched against Acadia by Robert Sedgwick and John Leverett. Sedgwick captured the principal Acadian ports of Port Royal and Fort Pentagouet and soon gave up military command of the province to Leverett. During this time he and Sedgwick enforced a virtual trade monopoly on French Acadia for their benefit, leading some in the colony to view Leverett as a predatory opportunist. Leverett funded much of the cost of the occupation himself, and then petitioned the English government for reimbursement. Although they authorized payment, the government made it contingent on the colony performing an audit of Leverett's finances, which never took place. Leverett was consequently still petitioning for compensation after the Restoration (1660).

In 1656, Oliver Cromwell granted Acadia/Nova Scotia to proprietors Sir Thomas Temple and William Crowne. Shortly after, the two bought Charles de Saint-Étienne de la Tour’s patent as baronet of Nova Scotia. By this purchase, Crowne and Temple agreed to pay la Tour’s debt of £3,379 to the widow of Maj.-Gen. Edward Gibbons of Boston, and Temple assumed the cost of the English that which had earlier captured the fort on the Saint John River. According to his statement of losses in about 1668, Crowne supplied the money and security for the purchases.

The following year Crowne with his son John (but not his wife), Temple and a group of settlers came to Nova Scotia on the ship Satisfaction. Crowne and Temple divided the province between them in February 1658, with Crowne taking the western part, including the fort of Pentagouet (now Castine, Maine), and building a trading post at "Negu", or "Negu alias Cadascat", on the Penobscot River. The agreement was signed on 15 February 1658, witnessed by John Crowne and Governor John Endecott. Each party gave a bond of £20,000. On 1 November 1658, Crowne leased his territory to a Captain George Curwin (grandfather of George Corwin, high sheriff during the Salem witch trials) and Ensign Joshua Scottow, then in 1659 he leased it to Temple for a period of four years, at a rate of £110 per annum. Temple did not pay the lease after the first year, but remained in possession of the territory. During this period, Crowne was living in Boston, Massachusetts, of which he was made a Freeman on 30 May 1660.

Temple had his headquarters at Penobscot (present-day Castine, Maine), keeping garrisons at Port Royal and at Saint John. In 1659, the la Tour fort at the mouth of the Saint John River was abandoned in favour of a new fort at Jemseg, 50 miles (80 km) or so up the river, where Temple established a trading post. The location was advantageous as occupiers were put out of the way of seagoing pirates. Jemseg was also a better place to trade with the descending Maliseet Indians.

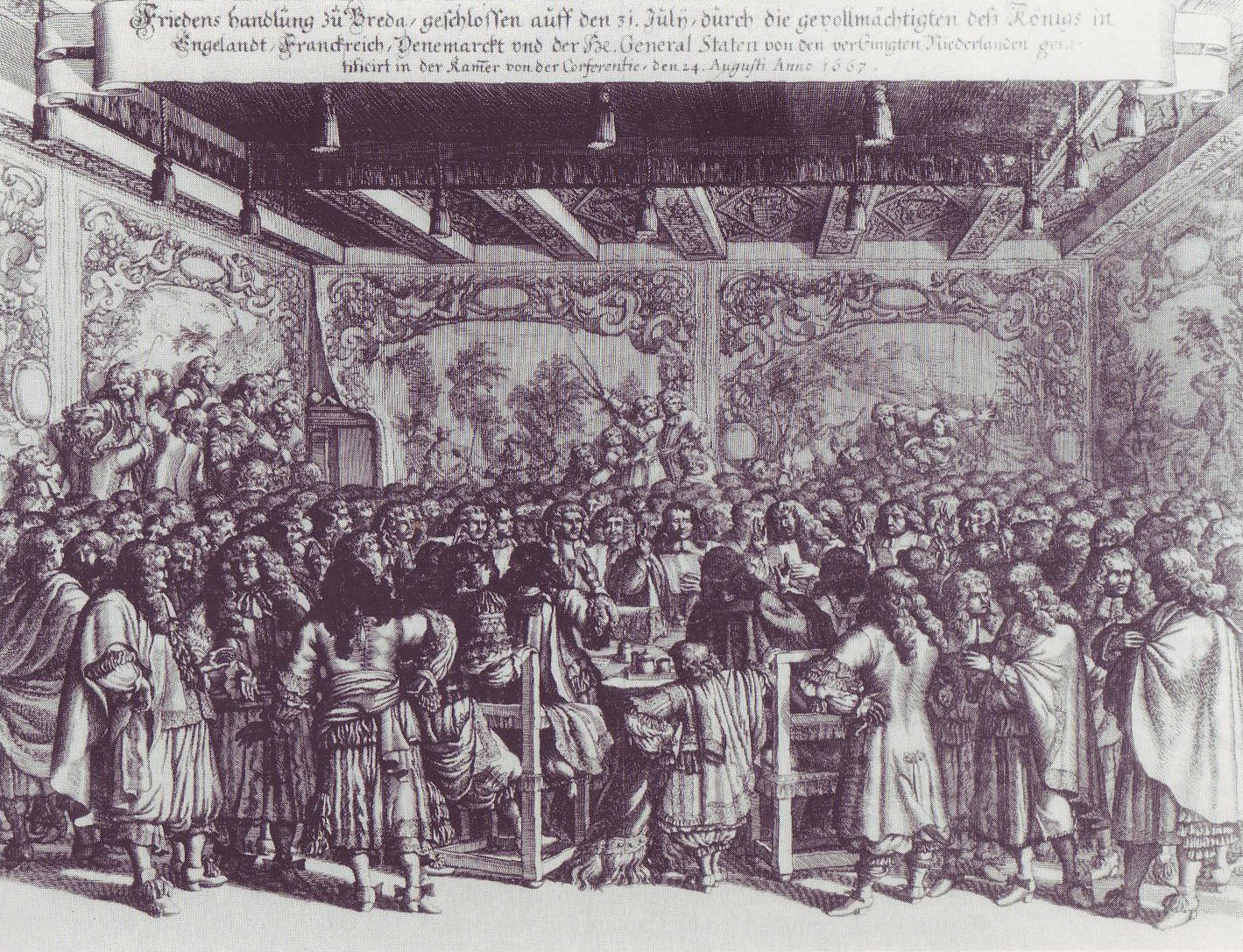
Engraving of the peace conference that led to the Treaty of Breda in 1667. Acadia was return to the French as a part of the terms of the treaty.

With the Restoration in 1660 Crowne returned to England to participate in the coronation of Charles II, and to defend their claim to Nova Scotia. The grant to Crowne and Temple had been made by Cromwell under the Commonwealth; now that Charles had ascended the throne there were a number of other claimants. These included Thomas Elliot (a groom of the bedchamber to Charles II), Sir Lewis Kirke and others (who had taken Acadia in the expedition against Quebec in 1632), and heirs of Sir William Alexander (the original grantee, from whom Charles de la Tour's father had obtained the grant). In 1661 the French Ambassador claimed the territory for France. On 22 June 1661 he submitted a statement on the manner in which he and Temple became proprietors. While in England, Crowne also pleaded the cause of the colonists before the council and lord chamberlain on 4 December 1661. Temple returned to England in 1662 and was successful in obtaining a new grant as well as a commission as governor. He promised to restore Crowne's territory and make reparations, but did not. Crowne pursued this in the New England courts, but was unsuccessful, the courts eventually deciding they did not have jurisdiction. The colony was eventually restored to France in the 1667 Treaty of Breda, but the English would not actually give up control until 1670.

=== Dutch conquest (1674) ===
In 1674, the Dutch briefly conquered Acadia, renaming the colony New Holland.

=== Remainder of 17th century ===
During the last decades of the seventeenth century, Acadians migrated from the capital, Port Royal, and established what would become the other major Acadian settlements: Grand Pré, Chignecto, Cobequid and Pisiguit.

Acadia was occupied by the English during King William's War, the North American theatre of the Nine Years' War (1688-1697). Acadia was integrated into the newly formed Province of Massachusetts Bay in 1691, along with bordering areas in what is now Maine. The Peace of Ryswick treaties gave Acadia back to France in 1697.

== 18th century ==
=== Colonial wars ===
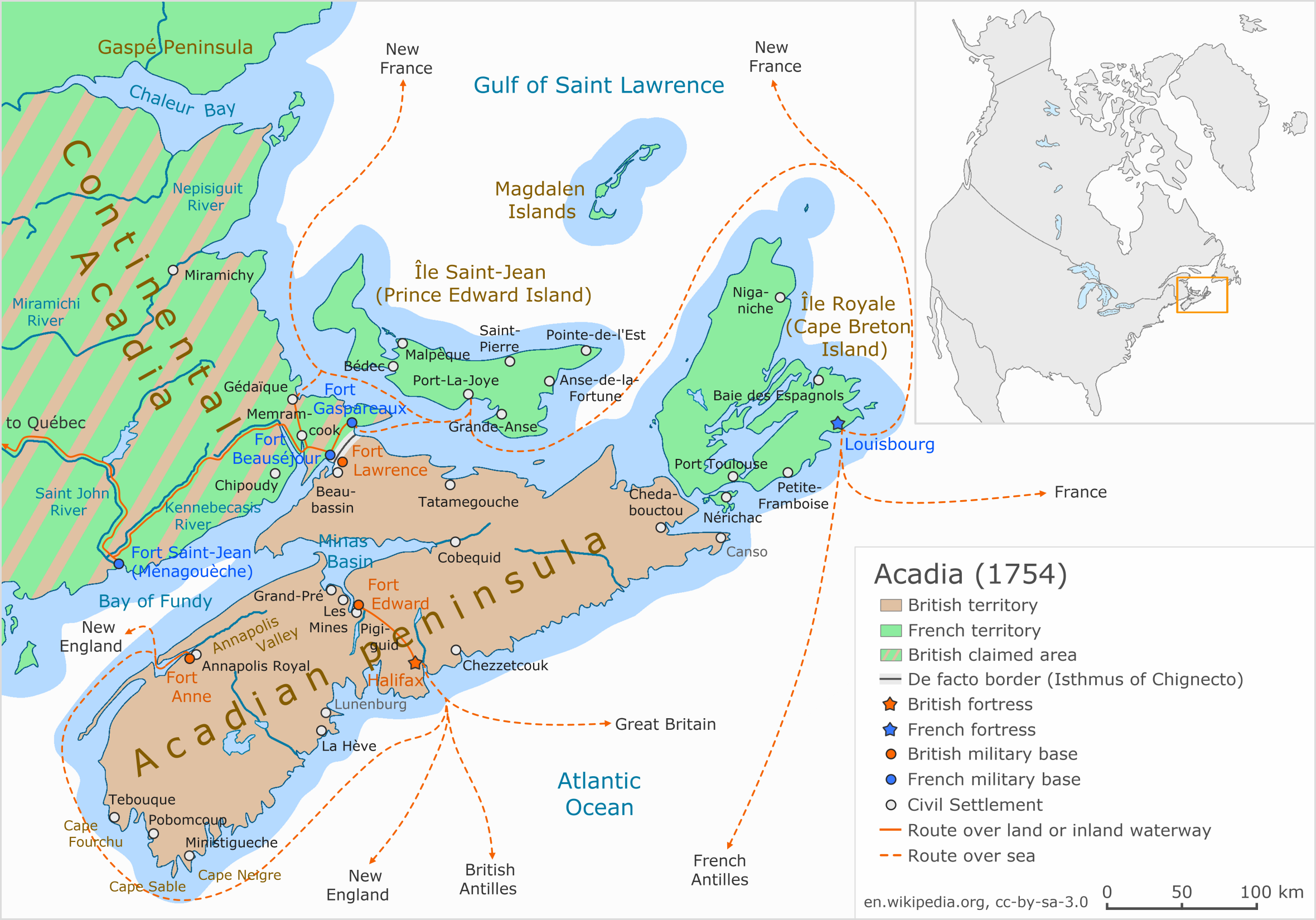
Map of Nova Scotia and the surrounding area in 1754, prior to the outbreak of the Seven Years' War

There were six colonial wars that took place in Nova Scotia over a seventy-five year period including the French and Indian Wars as well as Father Rale's War and Father Le Loutre's War. These wars were fought between New England and New France and their respective native allies before the British defeated the French in North America (1763). During these wars, Acadians, Mi'kmaq and Maliseet from the region fought to protect the border of Acadia from New England, which New France defined as the Kennebec River in southern Maine. Queen Anne's War and Father Le Loutre's War involved attempting to prevent the New Englanders from taking the capital of Acadia, Port Royal, establishing themselves at Canso in Father Rale's War and establishing Halifax.

The seventy-five year period of war ended with the Halifax Treaties between the British and the Mi'kmaq (1761).

==== Expulsion of the Acadians (1755-64) ====
The Expulsion (1755–1764) occurred during the French and Indian War (the North American theatre of the Seven Years' War)^{F} and was part of the British military campaign against New France. The British first deported Acadians to the Thirteen Colonies, and after 1758, transported additional Acadians to Britain and France. In all, of the 14,100 Acadians in the region, approximately 11,500 Acadians were deported. After Britain won the French and Indian War, between 1759 and 1768, about 8,000 New England Planters responded to Governor Charles Lawrence's request for settlers from the New England colonies.

=== Governmental changes ===
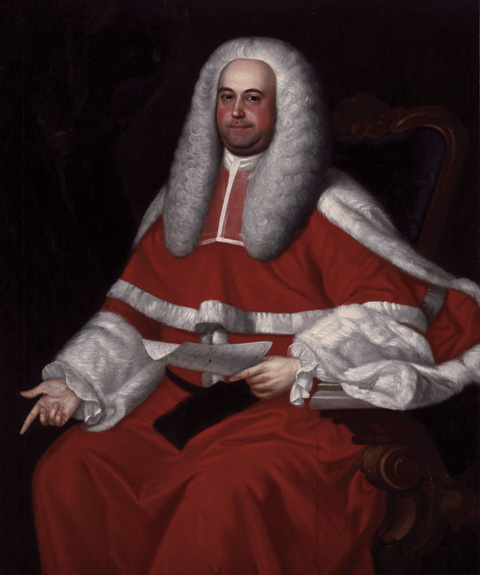
Portrait of Jonathan Belcher in 1757. He served as the first Chief Justice for the Nova Scotia Supreme Court from 1754 to 1776.

The colony's governance changed during this time. Nova Scotia was granted a supreme court in 1754, with the appointment of Jonathan Belcher and the creation of the Legislative Assembly in 1758, on the pattern of Britain's other Atlantic colonies. In 1763 Cape Breton Island became part of Nova Scotia. In 1769, St. John's Island (now Prince Edward Island) became a separate colony. The county of Sunbury was created in 1765, and included all of the territory of current-day New Brunswick and eastern Maine as far as the Penobscot River. In 1784, the western, mainland portion of the colony was separated and became the province of New Brunswick. Maine became part of the newly independent American state of Massachusetts, but the international boundary was vague. Cape Breton became a separate colony in 1784; it was returned to Nova Scotia in 1820.

Confronted with a large number of New Englanders who had settled in Nova Scotia and were sympathetic to the American War of Independence, Nova Scotian politicians in 1774–75 adopted a policy of enlightened moderation and humanism. Governing a marginal colony that received little attention from London, the royal governor, Francis Legge (1772 to 1776) battled the popularly elected assembly for control of the policies regarding trade, commerce, and taxation. Nova Scotia legislatorJohn Day, elected to the assembly in 1774, called for Montesquieu-type fundamental reforms that would balance political power among the three branches of government. Day argued that taxes should be assessed according to actual wealth, and to discourage patronage there should be term limits for all officials. He thought members of the Executive Council should own at least £1000 of property to connect their personal interest in the welfare of the colony as a whole. He wanted the dismissal of judges who misused their offices. These reforms were not as yet enacted, but they suggest that politicians in Nova Scotia were aware of the demands being made by Americans, and hoped their moderate proposals would reduce possible tensions with the British government.

=== Scottish settlers ===
In 1762, the earliest of the Fuadaich nan Gàidheal (Scottish Highland Clearances) forced many Gaelic families off their ancestral lands. The first ship loaded with Hebridean colonists arrived on "St. John's Island" (Prince Edward Island) in 1770, with later ships following in 1772 and 1774. In 1773, a ship named The Hector landed in Pictou, Nova Scotia, with 169 settlers mostly originating from the Isle of Skye. In 1784, the last barrier to Scottish settlement—a law restricting land-ownership on Cape Breton Island—was repealed, and soon PEI and certain parts of Nova Scotia (such as Pictou County) were predominantly Gaelic-speaking. It is estimated more than 50,000 Gaelic settlers immigrated to Nova Scotia and Cape Breton Island between 1815 and 1870. The Gaelic language of these settlers persists in Nova Scotia, with approximately 2,000 individuals throughout Atlantic Canada speaking what is now termed Canadian Gaelic.

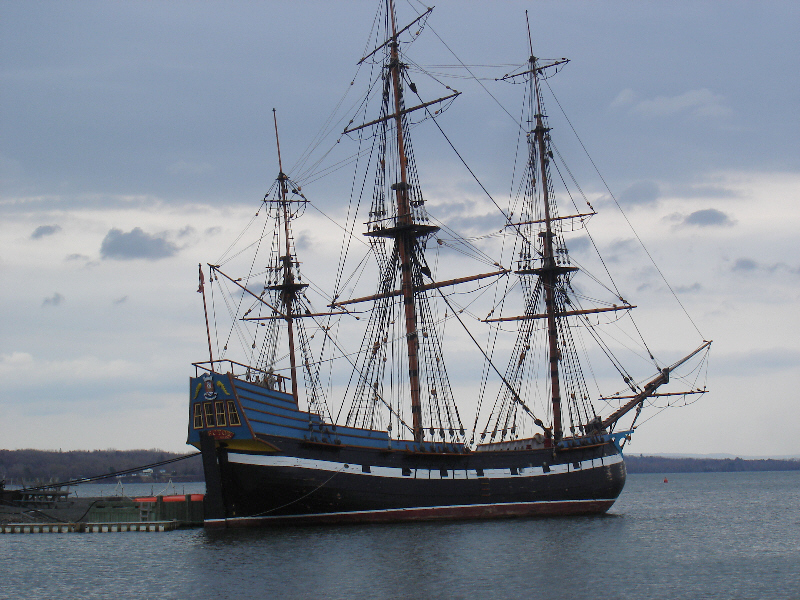
Replica of the ship Hector in 2009. The original ship brought 169 settlers from the Isle of Skye to Nova Scotia in 1773.

==== Scottish clans ====
In the Scottish Highlands, the traditional clan system was suppressed after the failed Jacobite rising of 1745, supporting the Stuart dynasty's claims to the throne. Scottish settlers to Nova Scotia reconstituted clan settlements in Cape Breton that persisted into the early 20th century. The clan system was tribal, involving an extended kin group that held land in common. Property was typically owned by the whole kinship group. In Scotland, clansmen rejected feudal claims of landlordship. The pioneers to Cape Breton sought out their own kin and settled alongside them. Farms passed from one branch of a family to another through succeeding generations, but continued to be occupied by members of the same clan. Clan members helped each other with communal barn raising and shared labour and tools. In Nova Scotia, the system was maintained through arranged marriages, mutual aid and communal tenure. The system enabled survival and efficiency in a harsh pioneering environment.

=== American War of Independence (1775-1783) ===
The American War of Independence (1776–1783) had a significant impact on shaping Nova Scotia. Initially there was ambivalence in Nova Scotia, "the 14th American Colony" as some called it, over whether the colony should join the rebelling Thirteen Colonies in the war against Britain. A small number of Nova Scotians went south to serve with the Continental Army against the British; after the war, between 1798 and 1812, the United States Congress granted such supporters land in the Refugee Tract in Ohio.

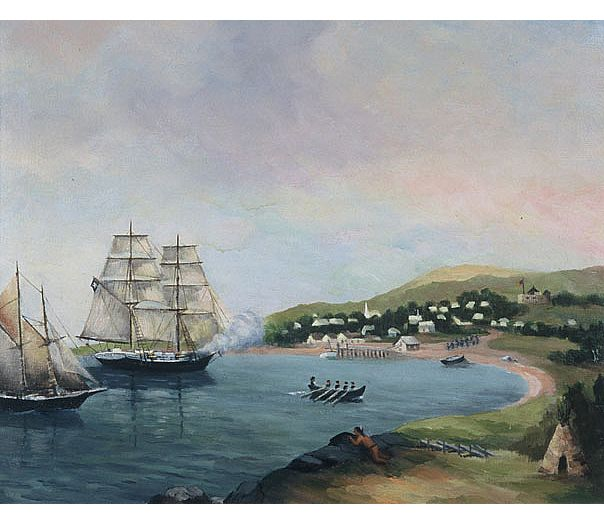
Depiction of the raid on Lunenburg in 1782 by American privateers, during the American Revolutionary War

Rebellions flared at the Battle of Fort Cumberland (November 1776), the Siege of Saint John (1777), the Maugerville Rebellion in 1776 and the Battle at Miramichi in 1779. However the Nova Scotia government in Halifax was controlled by an Anglo-European mercantile elite for whom loyalty was more profitable than rebellion. Facing attacks which forced choices of loyalty, rebellion or neutrality, settlers outside Halifax experienced a religious revival that expressed some of their anxieties. Throughout the war, United States privateers devastated the maritime economy by raiding many of Nova Scotia's coastal communities. In addition to capturing 225 vessels either leaving or arriving at Nova Scotia ports, American privateers made regular land raids, attacking Lunenburg, Annapolis Royal, Canso and Liverpool. American privateers repeatedly raided Canso, Nova Scotia in 1775 and 1779, destroying the fisheries, which were worth £50,000 a year to Britain.^{B} These American raids alienated many sympathetic or neutral Nova Scotians into supporting the British. By the end of the war a number of Nova Scotian privateers were outfitted to attack American shipping.

To guard against repeated American privateer attacks, the 84th Regiment of Foot (Royal Highland Emigrants) was garrisoned at forts around Atlantic Canada to strengthen the small and ill-equipped militia companies of the colony. Fort Edward (Nova Scotia) in Windsor, Nova Scotia, was the Regiment's headquarters to prevent a possible American land assault on Halifax from the Bay of Fundy. There was an American attack on Nova Scotia by land, the Battle of Fort Cumberland followed by the Siege of Saint John (1777)

The British naval squadron based at Halifax was successful in deterring any American invasion and in blocking American support for Nova Scotia rebels; it launched some attacks on New England, such as the Battle of Machias (1777). However the Royal Navy was unable to establish naval supremacy. While many American privateers were captured in battles such as the Naval battle off Halifax, many more continued attacks on shipping and settlements until the final months of the war. The Royal Navy struggled to maintain British supply-lines, defending convoys from American and in 1781 (after the Franco-American alliance against Great Britain) from French attacks - such as a fiercely-fought convoy battle, the naval engagement with a French fleet at Sydney, Nova Scotia, near Spanish River, Cape Breton.

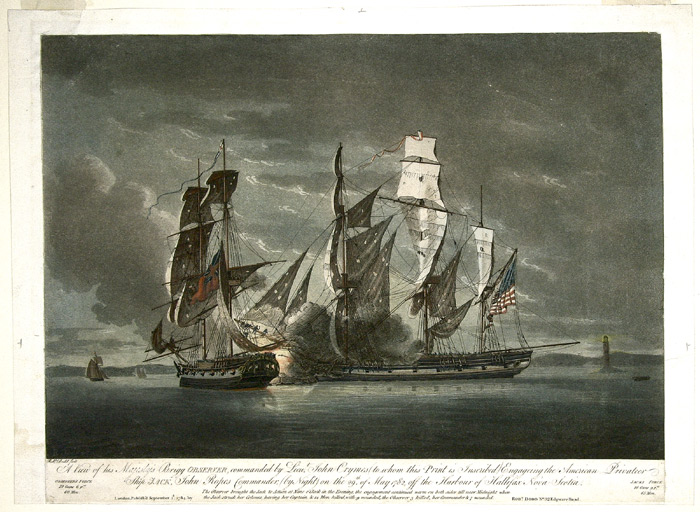
HMS Observer engages an American privateer ship Jack during a naval battle off Halifax in 1782

As the New England Planters (1759 onwards) and American Loyalists (1776 onwards) began to arrive in Mi'kmaki (the Maritimes) in greater numbers, economic, environmental and cultural pressures were put on the Mi'kmaq with the erosion of the intent of the treaties. The Mi'kmaq tried to enforce the treaties they had made through threat of force. At the beginning of the American Revolution, many Mi'kmaq and Maliseet tribes were supportive of the Americans against the British. They participated in the Maugerville Rebellion and the Battle of Fort Cumberland in 1776. (Mí'kmaq delegates concluded the first international treaty, the Treaty of Watertown, with the United States soon after it declared its independence in July 1776. These delegates did not officially represent the Mi'kmaq government, although many individual Mi'kmaq did privately join the Continental Army as a result.) During the St. John River expedition of June 1777, Col. Allan's untiring effort to gain the friendship and support of the Maliseet and Mi'kmaq for the Revolution was somewhat successful. There was a significant exodus of Maliseet from the St John River to join the American forces at Machias, Maine. On Sunday, July 13, 1777, a party of between 400 and 500 men, women, and children, embarked in 128 canoes from the Old Fort Meduetic (8 miles below Woodstock) for Machias. The party arrived at a very opportune moment for the Americans, and afforded material assistance in the defence of that post during the attack made by Sir George Collier from 13 to 15 August. The British did only minimal damage to the place, and the services of the Indians on the occasion earned for them the thanks of the council of Massachusetts. In June 1779, Mi’kmaq in the Miramichi attacked and plundered some of the British in the area. The following month, British Captain Augustus Harvey, in command of HMS Viper, arrived in the area and battled with the Mi’kmaq. One Mi’kmaq was killed and 16 were taken prisoner to Quebec. The prisoners were eventually brought to Halifax, where they were later released upon signing the Oath of Allegiance to the British Crown on 28 July 1779.^{C}

=== Migration of Loyalists ===
After the British were defeated in the Thirteen Colonies, some former Nova Scotian territory in Maine entered the control of the newly independent American state of Massachusetts. British troops from Nova Scotia helped evacuate approximately 30,000 United Empire Loyalists (American Tories), who settled in Nova Scotia, with land grants by the Crown as some compensation for their losses. Of these, 14,000 went to present-day New Brunswick and in response the mainland portion of the Nova Scotia colony was separated and became the province of New Brunswick with Sir Thomas Carleton the first governor on August 16, 1784. Loyalist settlements also led Cape Breton Island to become a separate colony in 1784, only to be returned to Nova Scotia in 1820.

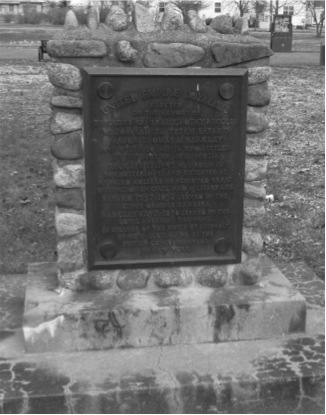
Monument to the loyalists that settled Middleton

The Loyalists exodus created new communities across Nova Scotia, including Shelburne, which was briefly one of the larger British settlements in North America, and infused the province with additional capital and skills. The Loyalist migration also caused political tensions between Loyalist leaders and the leaders of the existing New England Planters settlement. Some Loyalist leaders felt that the elected leaders in Nova Scotia represented a Yankee population which had been sympathetic to the American Revolutionary movement, and which disparaged the intensely anti-American, anti-republican attitudes of the Loyalists. "They [the loyalists]," Colonel Thomas Dundas wrote in 1786, "have experienced every possible injury from the old inhabitants of Nova Scotia, who are even more disaffected towards the British Government than any of the new States ever were. This makes me much doubt their remaining long dependent."

The Loyalist influx also created pressure for settlement land which pushed Nova Scotia's Mi'kmaq People to the margins as Loyalist land grants encroached on ill-defined native lands. Approximately 3,000 members of the Loyalist migration were Black Loyalists who founded the largest free Black settlement in North America at Birchtown, near Shelburne. However unfair treatment and harsh conditions caused about one-third of the Black Loyalists to combine forces with British abolitionists and the Committee for the Relief of the Black Poor to resettle in Sierra Leone. In 1792, Black Loyalists from Nova Scotia founded Freetown and became known in Africa as the Nova Scotian Settlers.

Large numbers of Gaelic-speaking Highland Scots immigrated to Cape Breton and the western part of the mainland during the late 18th century and 19th century. In 1812 Sir Hector Maclean (the 7th Baronet of Morvern and 23rd Chief of the Clan Maclean) emigrated to Pictou from Glensanda and Kingairloch in Scotland bringing along almost the entire population of 500.

==== Decline of slavery (1787–1812) ====
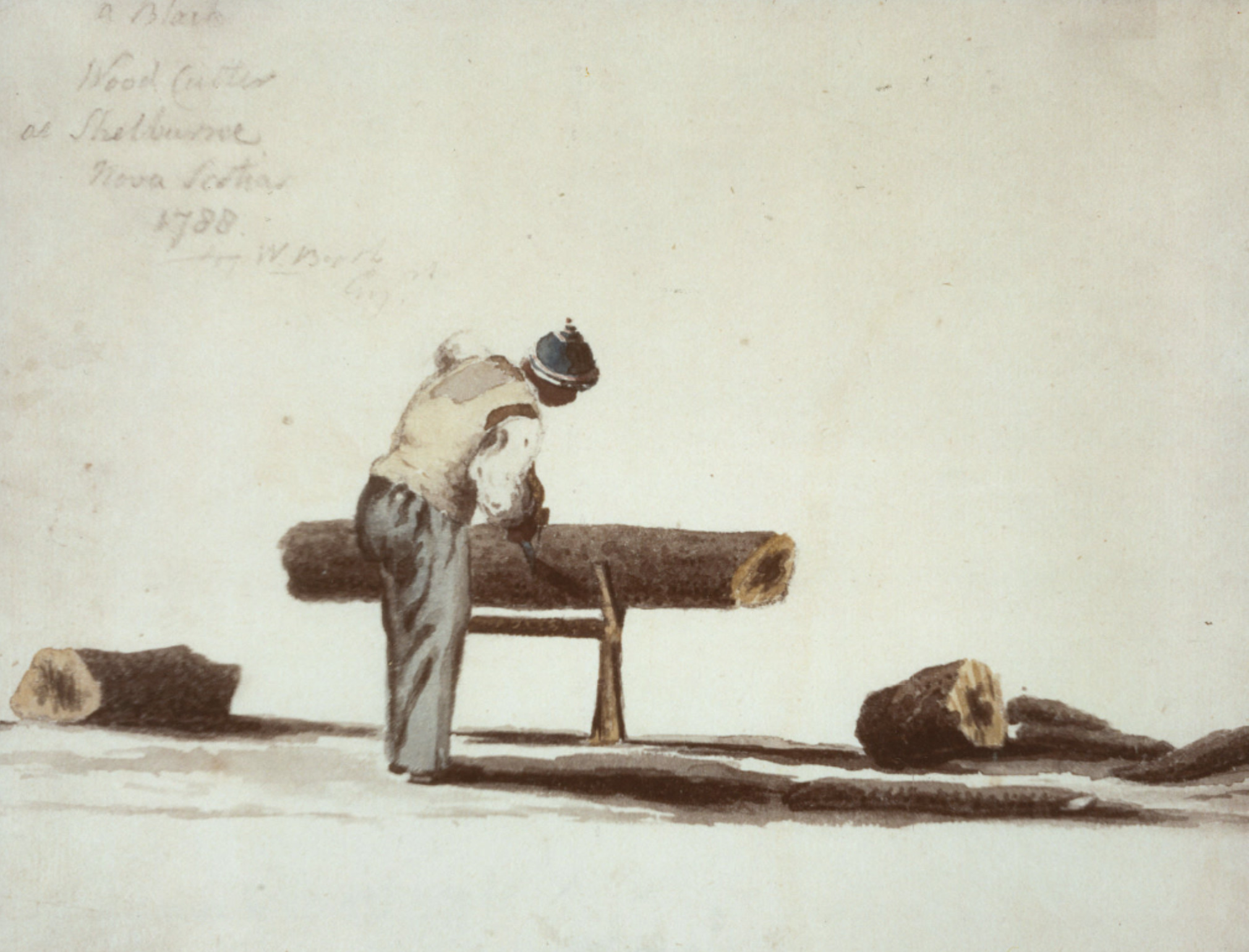
1788 illustration of a Black woodcutter in Shelburne, Nova Scotia

While many blacks who arrived in Nova Scotia during the American Revolution were free, others were not. Black slaves also arrived in Nova Scotia as the property of White American Loyalists. In 1772, prior to the American Revolution, the Somerset v Stewart decision freed James Somerset, a slave whose master had forcibly detained him to be sold abroad, followed by Knight v. Wedderburn in Scotland in 1778. This decision, in turn, influenced the colony of Nova Scotia. In 1788, abolitionist James Drummond MacGregor from Pictou published the first anti-slavery literature in Canada and began purchasing slaves' freedom and chastising his colleagues in the Presbyterian church who owned slaves. In 1790 John Burbidge freed his slaves. Led by Richard John Uniacke, in 1787, 1789 and again on January 11, 1808, the Nova Scotian legislature refused to legalise slavery. Two chief justices, Thomas Andrew Lumisden Strange (1790–1796) and Sampson Salter Blowers (1797–1832) waged "judicial war" in their efforts to free slaves from their owners in Nova Scotia.^{D} They were held in high regard in the colony. By the end of the War of 1812 and the arrival of the Black Refugees, there were few slaves left in Nova Scotia. (The Slave Trade Act 1807 outlawed the slave trade in the British Empire in 1807 and the Slavery Abolition Act 1833 outlawed slavery altogether.)

== 19th century ==
=== Early 19th century ===
==== Renewed wars with France ====
The French Revolutionary and later Napoleonic Wars at first created confusion and hardship as the fishery was disrupted and Nova Scotia's West Indies trade suffered severe French attacks. However, military spending in the strategic colony gradually led to increasing prosperity. Many Nova Scotian merchants outfitted their own privateers to attack French and Spanish shipping in the West Indies. The maturing colony built new roads and lighthouses and in 1801 established a lifesaving station on Sable Island to deal with the many international shipwrecks on the island.

==== War of 1812 ====
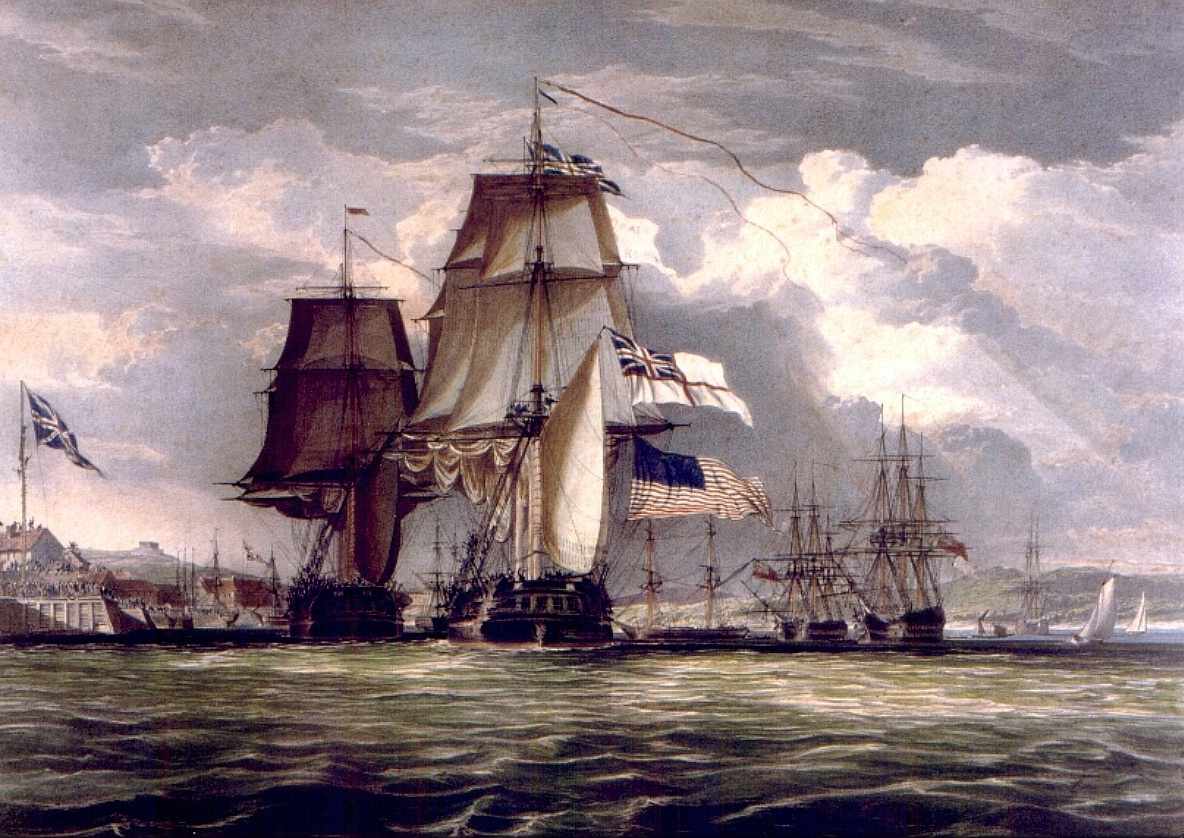
HMS Shannon leading the captured USS Chesapeake in Halifax Harbour during the War of 1812

During the War of 1812 with the United States, Nova Scotia became an even larger military base for the British as the centre for the British Royal Navy's blockade and naval raids on the United States. The colony also contributed to the war effort by purchasing or building various privateer ships to seize 250 American vessels. The colony's privateers were led by the town of Liverpool, Nova Scotia, notably by the schooner Liverpool Packet which captured over fifty ships in the war – the most of any privateer in Canada. The Sir John Sherbrooke (Halifax), jointly owned between Liverpool and Halifax was also very successful during the war, being the largest privateer from British North America. Other communities also joined the privateer campaign, including Annapolis Royal, Windsor, and in Lunenburg, Nova Scotia, three members of the town of purchased a privateer schooner and named it Lunenburg on August 8, 1814. The Nova Scotian privateer vessel captured seven American vessels.

Perhaps the most dramatic moment in the war for Nova Scotia was when HMS Shannon led the captured American frigate USS Chesapeake into Halifax Harbour (1813). The captain of the Shannon was injured, and Nova Scotian Provo Wallis took command of the ship to escort the Chesapeake to Halifax. Many of the prisoners were kept at Deadman's Island, Halifax. At the same time, there was HMS Hogue's traumatic capture of the American privateer Young Teazer off Chester, Nova Scotia.

On September 3, 1814, a British fleet from Halifax, Nova Scotia, began to lay siege to Maine to re-establish British title to Maine east of the Penobscot River, an area the British had renamed "New Ireland". Carving off "New Ireland" from New England had been a goal of the British government and settlers of Nova Scotia ("New Scotland") since the American Revolution. The British expedition involved eight war-ships and ten transports (carrying 3,500 British regulars) that were under the overall command of Sir John Coape Sherbrooke, then Lt. Gov. of Nova Scotia. On July 3, 1814, the expedition captured the coastal town of Castine, Maine and then went on to raid Belfast, Machias, Eastport, Hampden and Bangor (See Battle of Hampden). After the war, Maine was returned to America through the Treaty of Ghent. The British returned to Halifax and, with the spoils of war they had taken from Maine, they built Dalhousie University (established 1818).

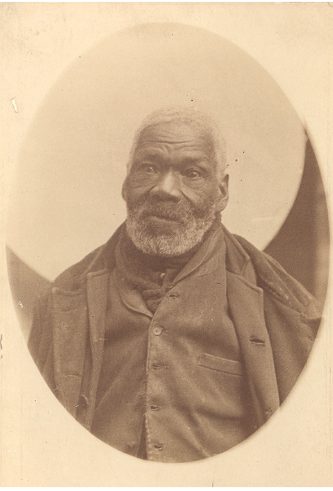
Photo of Gabriel Hall, a black refugee from the War of 1812

The Black Refugees from the War of 1812 were African American slaves who fought for the British and were relocated to Nova Scotia. The Black Refugees were the second group of African Americans, after the Black Loyalists, to defect to the British side and be relocated to Nova Scotia. However, there was also migration out of the colony because of the hardships immigrants faced. Reverend Norman McLeod led a large group of approximately 800 Scottish residents from the St. Anns, Nova Scotia, to Waipu, New Zealand, during the 1850s.

==== Labour conditions ====
The Halifax Naval Yard during the 1775–1820 era had officials who took bribes from workers and practiced widespread nepotism. The laborers endured poor working conditions and limited personal freedoms. However, the laborers were willing to remain there for many years because wages were high and more steady than any alternative. Unlike almost any other jobs the yards paid disability benefits for men injured at work and gave retirement pensions to those who spent their career in the yards.

Nova Scotia had one of the first labour organizations in what became Canada. By 1799 workers set up a Carpenters' Society at Halifax, and soon there were attempts at organization by other craftsmen and tradesmen. Businessmen complained, and in 1816 Nova Scotia passed an act against trade unions, the preamble of which declared that great numbers of master tradesmen, journeymen, and workmen in the town of Halifax and other parts of the province had, by unlawful meetings and combinations, endeavored to regulate the rate of wages and effectuate other illegal aims. Unions remained illegal until 1851.

==== Responsible government ====
Nova Scotia was the first colony in British North America and in the British Empire to achieve responsible government in January–February 1848 and become self-governing through the efforts of Joseph Howe. (In 1758, Nova Scotia also became the first British colony to establish representative government, commemorated in 1908 by erecting the Dingle Tower.)

=== Latter 19th century ===
The first school for the deaf in Atlantic Canada, the Halifax School for the Deaf, was established on Göttingen St., Halifax (1856). The Halifax School for the Blind was opened on Morris Street in 1871. It was the first residential school for the blind in Canada.

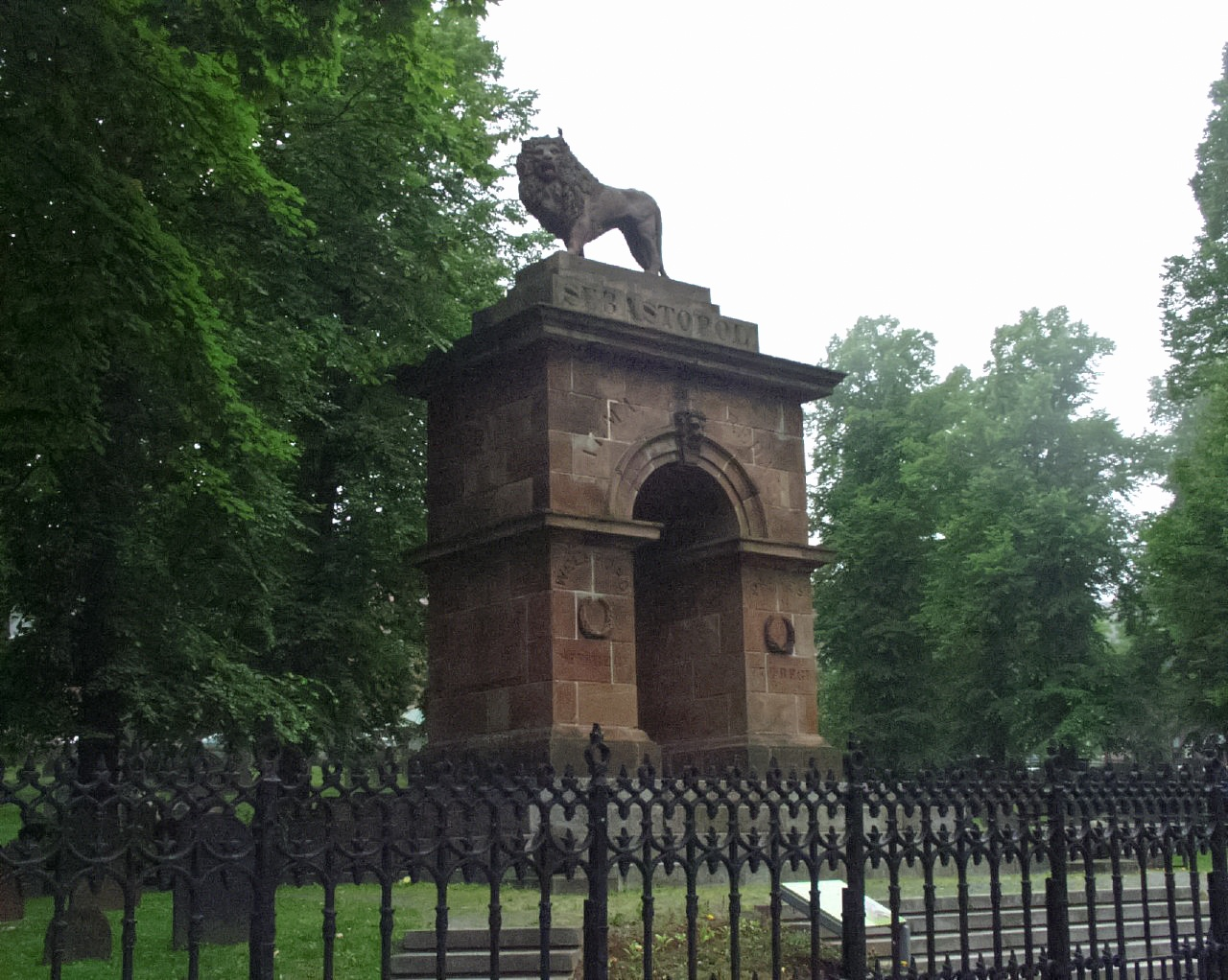
The Sebastopol Monument in 2007. It was unveiled in Halifax in 1860 to commemorate the British victory at the siege of Sevastopol and the Crimean War.

Nova Scotians fought in the Crimean War. The Welsford-Parker Monument in Halifax is the oldest war monument in Canada (1860) and the only Crimean War monument in North America. It commemorates the Siege of Sevastopol (1854–1855). Nova Scotians also participated in the Indian Mutiny. Two of the most famous were William Hall (VC) and Sir John Eardley Inglis, both of whom participated in the Siege of Lucknow. The 78th (Highlanders) Regiment of Foot were famous for their involvement with the siege and were later posted to Citadel Hill (Fort George).

==== American Civil War ====
Over 200 Nova Scotians have been identified as fighting in the American Civil War (1861–1865). Most joined Maine or Massachusetts infantry regiments, but one in ten served the Confederacy (South). The total likely reached two thousand as many young men had migrated to the U.S. before 1860. Pacifism, neutrality, anti-Americanism, and anti-"Yankee" sentiments all operated to keep the numbers down, but on the other hand, there were strong cash incentives to join the well-paid Northern army and the long tradition of emigrating out of Nova Scotia, combined with a zest for adventure, attracted many young men.

The British Empire (including Nova Scotia) declared neutrality, and Nova Scotia prospered greatly from trade with the Union. Nova Scotia was the site of two minor international incidents during the war: the Chesapeake Affair and the escape from Halifax Harbour of the CSS Tallahassee, aided by Confederate sympathizers. Nova Scotia was a center for Confederate Secret Service agents and Confederate sympathizers and had a role in engaging in blockade running with arms largely from Britain. Blockade runners stopped in Halifax to rest and refuel where they were to pass through the Union blockade to deliver supplies to the Confederate Army. Nova Scotia's role in arms trafficking to the South was so noticeable that the Acadian Recorder in 1864 described Halifax's effort as a "mercenary aid to a fratricidal war, which, without outside intervention, would have long ago ended." U.S. Secretary of State William H. Seward complained on March 14, 1865:

Halifax has been for more than one year, and yet is, a naval station for vessels which, running the blockade, furnish supplies and munitions of war to our enemy, and it has been made a rendezvous for those piratical cruisers which come out from Liverpool and Glasgow, to destroy our commerce on the high seas, and even to carry war into the ports of the United States. Halifax is a postal and despatch station in the correspondence between the rebels at Richmond and their emissaries in Europe. Halifax merchants are known to have surreptitiously imported provisions, arms, and ammunition from our seaports, and then transshipped them to the rebels. The governor of Nova Scotia has been neutral, just, and friendly; so were the judges of the province who presided on the trial of the Chesapeake. But then it is understood that, on the other hand, merchant shippers of Halifax, and many of the people of Halifax, are willing agents and abettors of the enemies of the United States, and their hostility has proved not merely offensive but deeply injurious.

The war left many fearful that the North might attempt to annex British North America, particularly after the Fenian raids began (many Americans considered the Fenian raids as retribution against British-Canadian tolerance of and even aid to the Confederate activities in Canada against the Union during the Civil War (such as the Chesapeake Affair and the St. Albans Raid). In response, volunteer regiments were raised across Nova Scotia. British commander and Lt Governor of Nova Scotia Charles Hastings Doyle (after whom Port Hastings is named) led 700 troops out of Halifax to crush a Fenian attack on the New Brunswick border with Maine. This rather baseless scare was one of the main reasons why Britain sanctioned the creation of Canada (1867); to avoid another possible conflict with America and to leave the defence of Nova Scotia to a Canadian Government.

==== Canadian Confederation ====
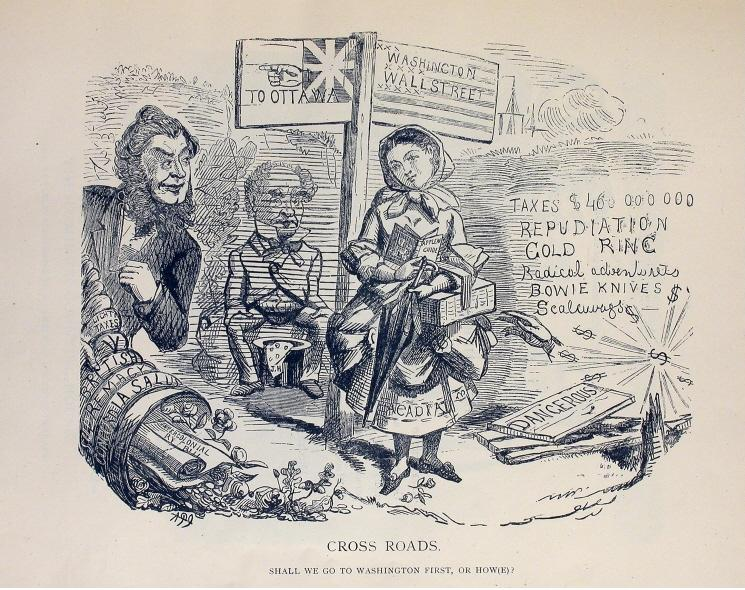
Political cartoon from 1868 where Nova Scotia, represented by the girl Acadia, is choosing between Charles Tupper and Canadian Confederation, or Joseph Howe and union with the US. Although Howe was only anti-Confederation, some had perceived he preferred joining the US.

The British North America Act, 1867, by which Nova Scotia became part of the Dominion of Canada, went into effect on July 1, 1867. Premier Charles Tupper had worked energetically to bring about the union. But it was controversial because localism, Protestant fears of Catholics and distrust of Canadians generally, and worries about losing free trade with America, were all intensified by the refusal of Tupper to consult Nova Scotia's voters on the subject. A movement for withdrawal from Canada developed, led by Joseph Howe. Howe's Anti-Confederation Party swept the next election, on September 18, 1867, winning 18 out of 19 federal seats, and 36 out of 38 seats in the provincial legislature. A motion passed by the Nova Scotia House of Assembly in 1868 refusing to recognise the legitimacy of Confederation has never been rescinded. With the great Hants County by-election of 1869, Howe was successful in turning the province away from appealing confederation to simply seeking "better terms" within it. Despite its temporary popularity, Howe's movement failed in its goal to withdraw from Canada because London was determined the union go forward. Howe did succeed in getting better financial terms for the province, and gained a national office for himself.

Long-term adverse factors came into play. In 1865 came the end of the American Civil War and all the extra business it had generated. In 1866 came the end of Canadian–American Reciprocity Treaty, which led to higher and damaging American tariffs on goods imported from Nova Scotia. In the long run the transition at sea from wood-wind-water sailing to steel steamships undercut the advantages Nova Scotia had enjoyed before 1867. Many residents for decades grumbled that Confederation had slowed the economic progress of the province and it lagged other parts of Canada. Repeal, as anti-confederation became known, would rear its head again in the 1880s, and transform into the Maritime Rights Movement in the 1920s. Some Nova Scotia flags flew at half mast on Dominion Day as late as that time.

==== Golden Age of Sail ====
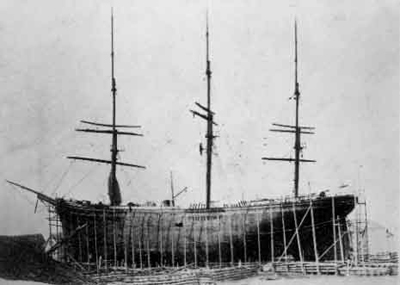
Photo of William D. Lawrence being built at Maitland in 1873. The ship was the longest wooden ship built in Canada.

Nova Scotia became a world leader in both building and owning wooden sailing ships in the second half of the century. Nova Scotia produced internationally recognized ship builders Donald McKay, John M. Blaikie and William Dawson Lawrence and ship designers such as Ebenezer Moseley as well the propeller inventor John Patch. Notable ships included the barque Stag, a clipper renowned for speed and the ship William D. Lawrence, the largest wooden ship ever built in Canada. Mariners such a Capt. George "Rudder" Churchill of Yarmouth became famous for their voyages. The province also produced a notable 19th-century female mariner, Bessie Hall from Annapolis Royal. The most famous of the sailors from Nova Scotia was Joshua Slocum who became the first man to sail single-handedly around the world (1895). Competition from steamships in the late 19th century ended the Golden Age of Sail, although the legacy continued to inspire mariners and the public into the following century with the many racing victories of the Bluenose schooner.

The population grew steadily from 277,000 in 1851 to 388,000 in 1871, mostly from natural increase since immigration was slight. The era is often called the province's golden age due to the economic growth, growth of towns and villages, maturing of business and institutions and the success of industries like shipbuilding. The idea of a past golden age came to prominence in the early 20th century by economic reformers in the Maritime Rights Movement and was exploited by the tourism industry in the 1930s to lure tourists to a romantic era of tall ships and antiques. Recent historians using census data have challenged the idea of Nova Scotia's golden age. In 1851–1871 there was an overall increase in per capita wealth holding. However, typical of 19th century capitalism, most of the gains went to the urban elites, especially businessmen and financiers living in Halifax. The wealth held by the top 10 per cent rose considerably over the two decades, but there was little improvement in the wealth levels in rural areas, which comprised the great majority of the population. Likewise Gwyn reports that gentlemen, merchants, bankers, colliery owners, shipowners, shipbuilders, and master mariners flourished. However the great majority of families were headed by farmers, fishermen, craftsmen and laborers. Many of them—and many widows—lived in poverty. Outmigration increased as the 19th century wore on.^{E} Thus the era was indeed a golden age but mainly for a small and powerful elite.

==== North-West Rebellion ====
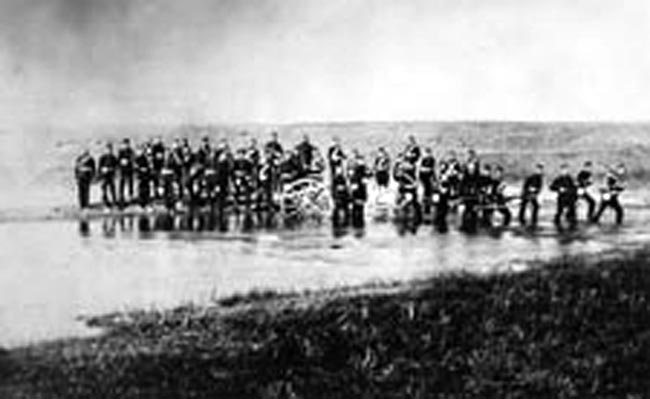
Members of the Halifax Provisional Battalion fording a stream near Swift Current, Saskatchewan during the North-West Rebellion

The Halifax Provisional Battalion was a military unit from Nova Scotia, Canada, which was sent to fight in the North-West Rebellion in 1885. The battalion was under command of Lieut.-Colonel James J. Bremner and consisted of 168 non-commissioned officers and men of The Princess Louise Fusiliers, 100 of the 63rd Battalion Rifles, and 84 of the Halifax Garrison Artillery, with 32 officers. The battalion left Halifax under orders for the North-West on Saturday, April 11, 1885, and they stayed for almost three months.

Prior to Nova Scotia's involvement, the province remained hostile to Canada in the aftermath of how the colony was forced into Canada. The celebration that followed the Halifax Provisional Battalion's return by train across the county ignited a national patriotism in Nova Scotia. Prime Minister Robert Borden, stated that "up to this time Nova Scotia hardly regarded itself as included in the Canadian Confederation... The rebellion evoked a new spirit... The Riel Rebellion did more to unite Nova Scotia with the rest of Canada than any event that had occurred since Confederation." Similarly, in 1907 Governor General Earl Grey declared, "This Battalion... went out Nova Scotians, they returned Canadians." The wrought iron gates at the Halifax Public Gardens were made in the Battalion's honour.

=== 19th century economic growth ===
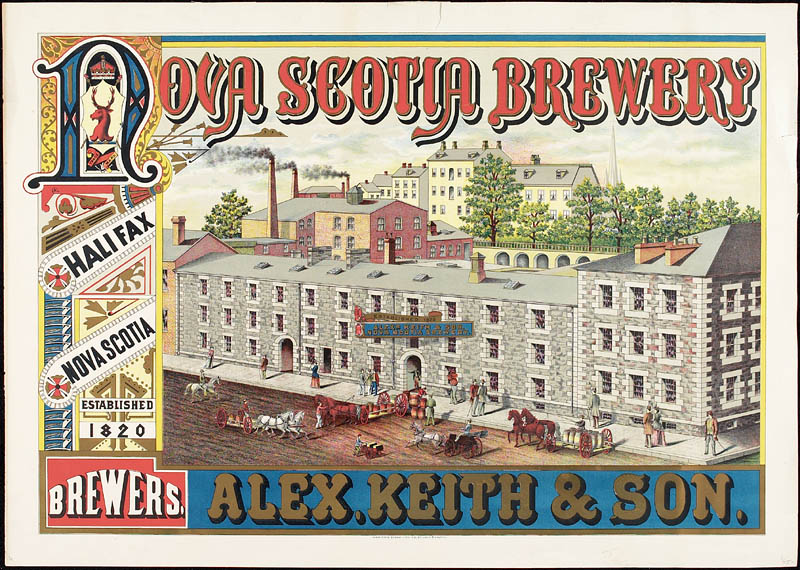
Depiction of Alexander Keith's Brewery, c. 1865–70. The brewery was established in Nova Scotia in 1820.

Throughout the nineteenth century, there were numerous businesses that were developed in Nova Scotia that became of national and international importance: The Starr Manufacturing Company, Susannah Oland and Sons Co., the Bank of Nova Scotia, Cunard Line, Alexander Keith's Brewery, Morse's Tea Company, among others.

Most people were farmers and agriculture dominated the economy, despite all the attention given to ships. The rural situation peaked in 1891 in terms of total rural population, farmland, grain production, cattle production, and number of farms, then fell steadily into the 21st century. Apples and dairy products resisted the downward trend in the 20th century.

The pattern of Nova Scotia's trade and tariffs between 1830 and 1866 suggests that the colony was already moving toward free trade before the Reciprocity Treaty of 1854 with the U.S. took effect. The treaty produced modest additional direct gains. The Reciprocity Treaty complemented the earlier movement toward free trade and stimulated the export of commodities sold primarily to the United States, especially coal.

Halifax was the home of Samuel Cunard. With his father, Abraham, a master ship's carpenter, he founded the A. Cunard & Co. cargo shipping company and later the Cunard Line, a pride of the British Empire. Samuel parlayed his father's modest waterfront properties into a succession of businesses that revolutionized transatlantic shipping and passenger travel with the introduction of steam and steel. Cunard was a booster who was active in philanthropy and helped found the Chamber of Commerce, where he found business partners for his ventures in banking, mining, and other businesses. In the process he became one of the largest landholders in the Maritime Provinces.

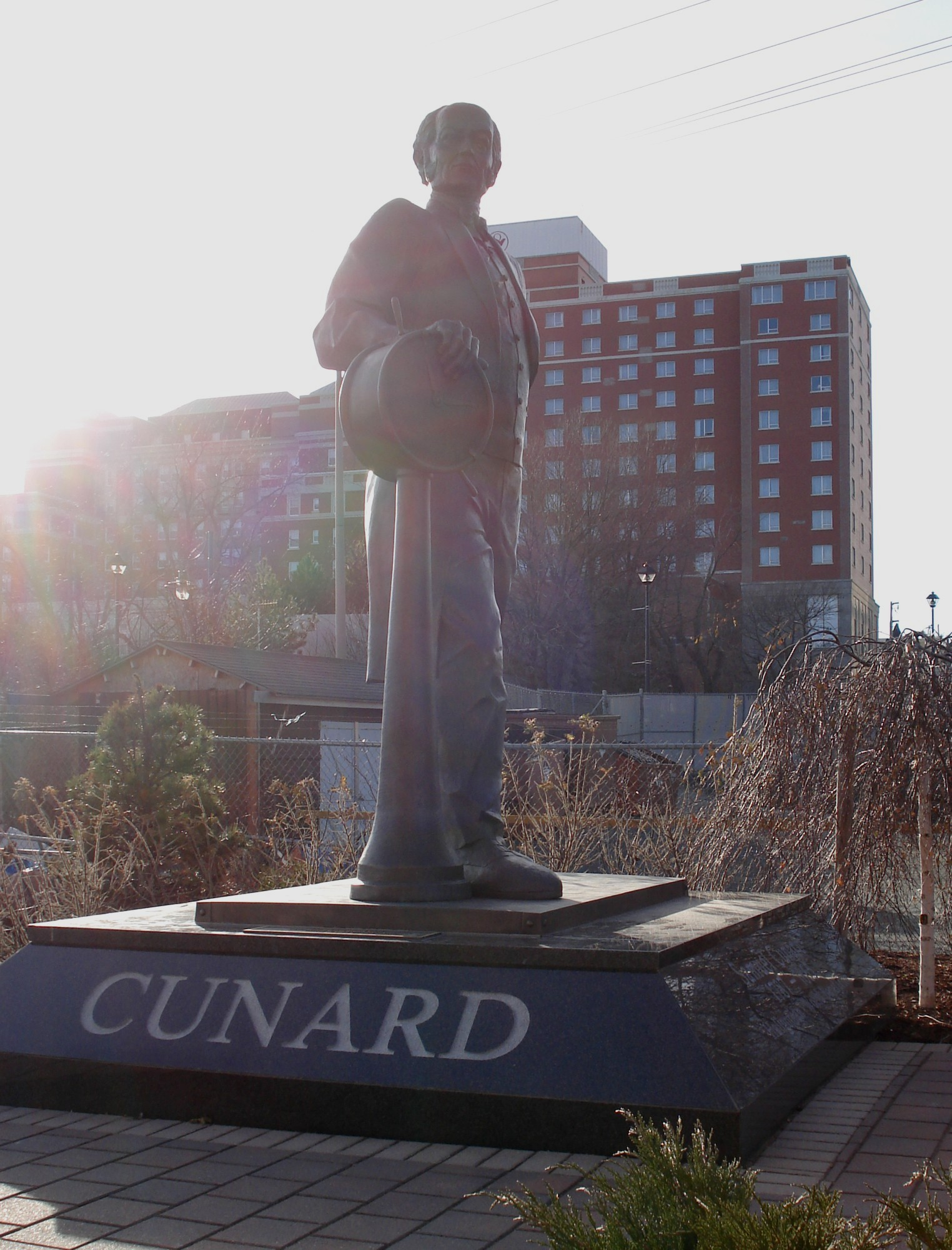
Statue of Samuel Cunard in 2006. Cunard started his steamship business in Nova Scotia.

John Fitzwilliam Stairs (1848–1904), scion of the powerful Stairs family, enlarged the family's multiple businesses by merging the cordage firms and sugar refineries and then creating the steel industry in the province. In order to develop new regional sources of capital, Stairs became an innovator in building legal and regulatory frameworks for these new forms of financial structure. Frost contrasts Stairs's success in promoting regional development with the obstacles that he had encountered in promoting regional interests, particularly at the federal level. The family finally sold its businesses in 1971, after 160 years.

After Confederation, boosters of Halifax expected federal help to make the city's natural harbor Canada's official winter port and a gateway for trade with Europe. Halifax's advantages included its location just off the Great Circle route made it the closest to Europe of any mainland North American port. But the new Intercolonial Railway (ICR) took an indirect, southerly route for military and political reasons, and the national government made little effort to promote Halifax as Canada's winter port. Ignoring appeals to nationalism and the ICR's own attempts to promote traffic to Halifax, most Canadian exporters sent their wares by train though Boston or Portland. No one was interested in financing the large-scale port facilities Halifax lacked. It took the First World War to at last boost Halifax's harbor into prominence on the North Atlantic.

Unionization, legal after 1851, was based on skilled crafts except in the coal mines and steel plants, where unskilled men could also join. There has been an increase in industrial unionism with the expansion of industry. International unionism with a strong American influence became important, as international unions began in 1869, when a local of the International Typographical Union was chartered in Halifax. In 1870 the woodworking trades started their union. Different unions banded together to support strike action, as seen in the organization of the Amalgamated Trade Unions of Halifax in 1889, which was succeeded by the Halifax District Trades and Labour Council in 1898. By the end of the 19th century there were more than 70 local unions in the province.

== 20th century ==
Established in 1894, the Local Council of Women of Halifax (LCWH) became a prominent suffragette group in the province during the early 20th century, having been devoted to improving the lives of women and children. One of the most significant achievements of the LCWH was its 24-year struggle for women's right to vote in 1918.

=== Early 20th century economy ===
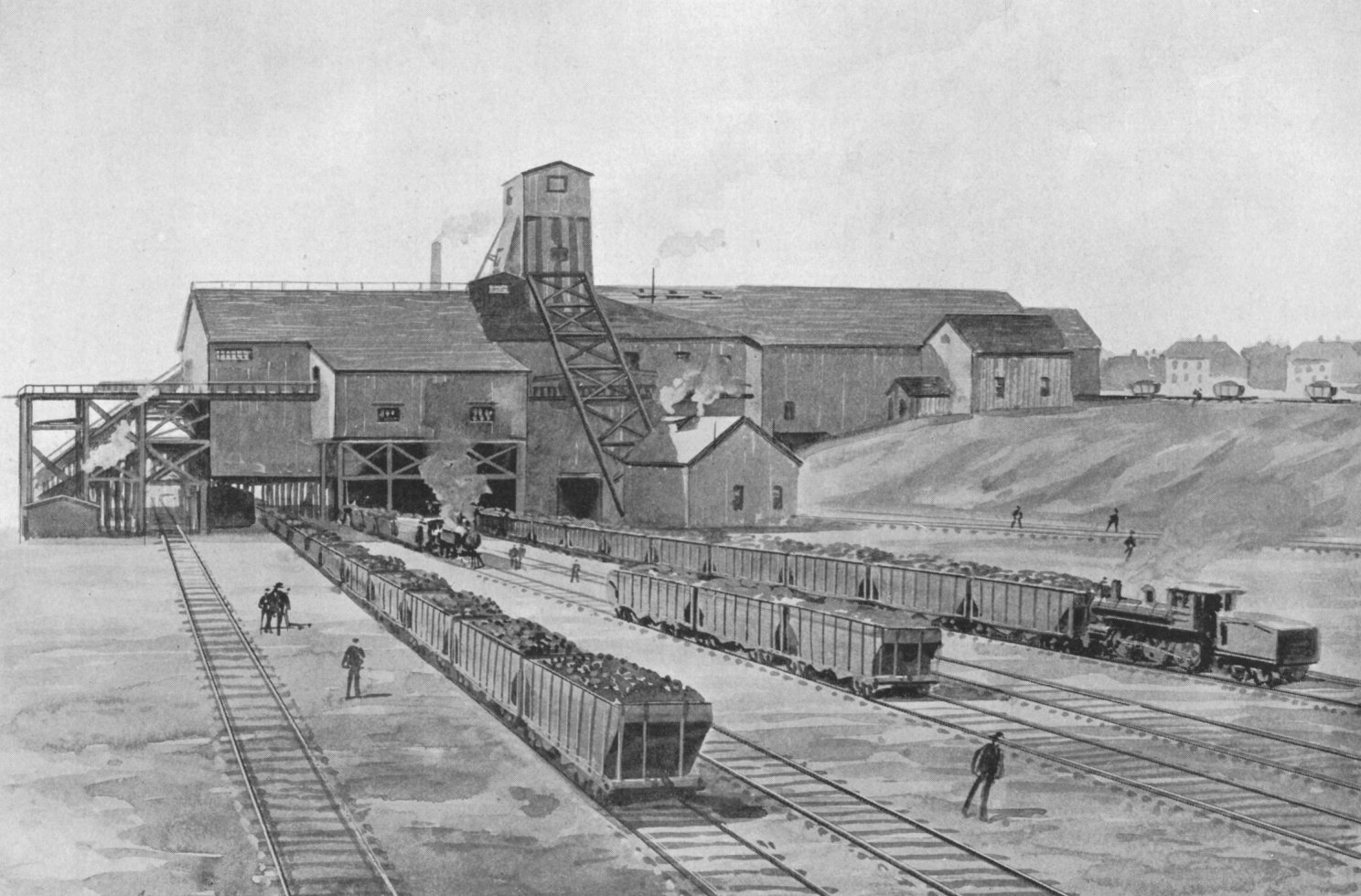
A Dominion Steel and Coal Corporation colliery in Reserve Mines, Nova Scotia, c. 1900

In the early 20th century Nova Scotia Steel and Coal Company (known as Scotia) became a vertically integrated industrial giant. It grew rapidly and made handsome profits from exports of coal, pig iron and steel products to Canadian and international markets. At first its convenient tidewater location and control over all steps of production boosted growth, as it grew through mergers and acquisitions. However the long term negative factors included fragmentation, limited Maritime region markets, rising costs, low quality raw materials, and the lack of external economies. When Scotia (now called DOSCO--Dominion Steel and Coal Corporation) finally closed in the 1960s it was a blow to numerous towns that had counted on its well paid jobs and the political activism of its workers, such as Florence, Reserve Mines, Sydney Mines, Trenton, and New Glasgow.

However, rural areas steadily lost population, especially the eastern counties. Liberal premiers George Henry Murray (1896–1923) and Ernest H. Armstrong (1923–25) implemented programs to improve rural life and modernize agricultural industry. They secured federal assistance through loans and grants for agriculture, roads, and immigration. Murray was criticized for being too cautious in his reforms, while Armstrong, even with a Liberal federal government behind him, was unable to keep the assistance flowing. The situation only worsened with the post-war downturn which brought the United Farmers Party to power in 1920 in the hardest hit areas of eastern Nova Scotia. The Liberals' failure to stem the decline of the area brought their defeat in 1925 by "rejuvenated" Conservatives who capitalized on Armstrong's weakness.

==== Labour unions ====
The Provincial Workmen's Association began in 1879 as a miners' union; in 1898, faced by a challenge from the Knights of Labor, it sought to embrace unions in all the industries of the province. The first local union of the United Mine Workers was established in 1908. After a struggle for control of the labour movement among the miners, the Provincial Workmen's Association was dissolved in 1917, and by 1919 the United Mine Workers took control of the coal miners. Success was due to the aggressive leadership of J. B. McLachlan (1869–1937), who left the coal mines of Scotland for Canada in 1902, became a Communist (1922 to 1936) and promoted a strong union and a tradition of independent labour politics. McLachlan's battles with the American UMWA leadership, particularly the dictatorial John L. Lewis, demonstrated his commitment to democratic unionism for the miners and a fighting union, but Lewis won and ousted McLachlan from power.

Women played an important, though quiet, role in support of the union movement in coal towns during the troubled 1920s and 1930s. They never worked for the mines but provided psychological support especially during strikes when the pay packets did not arrive. They were the family financiers and encouraged other wives who otherwise might have coaxed their menfolk to accept company terms. Women's labor leagues organized a variety of social, educational, and fund-raising functions. Women also violently confronted "scabs", policemen, and soldiers. They had to stretch the food dollar and show inventiveness in clothing their families.

=== Second Boer War ===
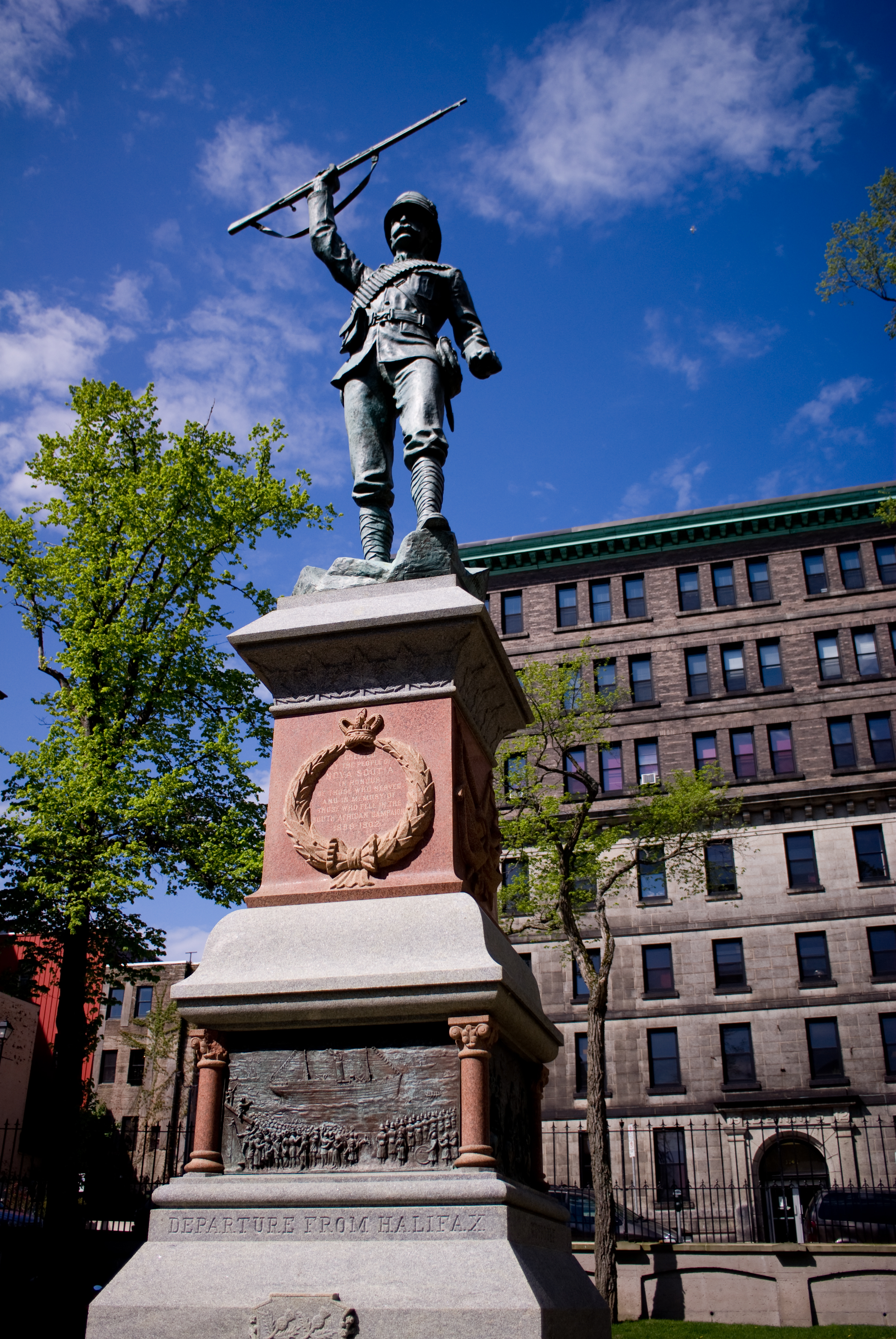
Boer War memorial outside Province House

During the Second Boer War (1899–1902), the First Contingent was composed of seven Companies from across Canada. The Nova Scotia Company (H) consisted of 125 men. (The total First Contingent was a total force of 1,019. Eventually over 8600 Canadians served.) The mobilization of the Contingent took place at Quebec. On October 30, 1899, the ship Sardinian sailed the troops for four weeks to Cape Town. The Boer War marked the first occasion in which large contingents of Nova Scotian troops served abroad (individual Nova Scotians had served in the Crimean War). The Battle of Paardeberg in February 1900 represented the second time Canadian soldiers saw battle abroad (the first being the Canadian involvement in the Nile Expedition). Canadians also saw action at the Battle of Faber's Put on May 30, 1900. On November 7, 1900, the Royal Canadian Dragoons engaged the Boers in the Battle of Leliefontein, where they saved British guns from capture during a retreat from the banks of the Komati River. Approximately 267 Canadians died in the War. 89 men were killed in action, 135 died of disease, and the remainder died of accident or injury. 252 were wounded.

Of all the Canadians who died during the war, the most famous was the young Lt. Harold Lothrop Borden of Canning, Nova Scotia. Harold Borden's father was Sir Frederick W. Borden, Canada's Minister of Militia who was a strong proponent of Canadian participation in the war. Another famous Nova Scotian casualty of the war was Charles Carroll Wood, son of the Confederate naval captain John Taylor Wood and the first Canadian to die in the war.

=== First World War ===
During World War I, Halifax became a major international port and naval facility. The harbour became a major shipment point for war supplies, troop ships to Europe from Canada and the United States and hospital ships returning the wounded. These factors drove a major military, industrial and residential expansion of the city.

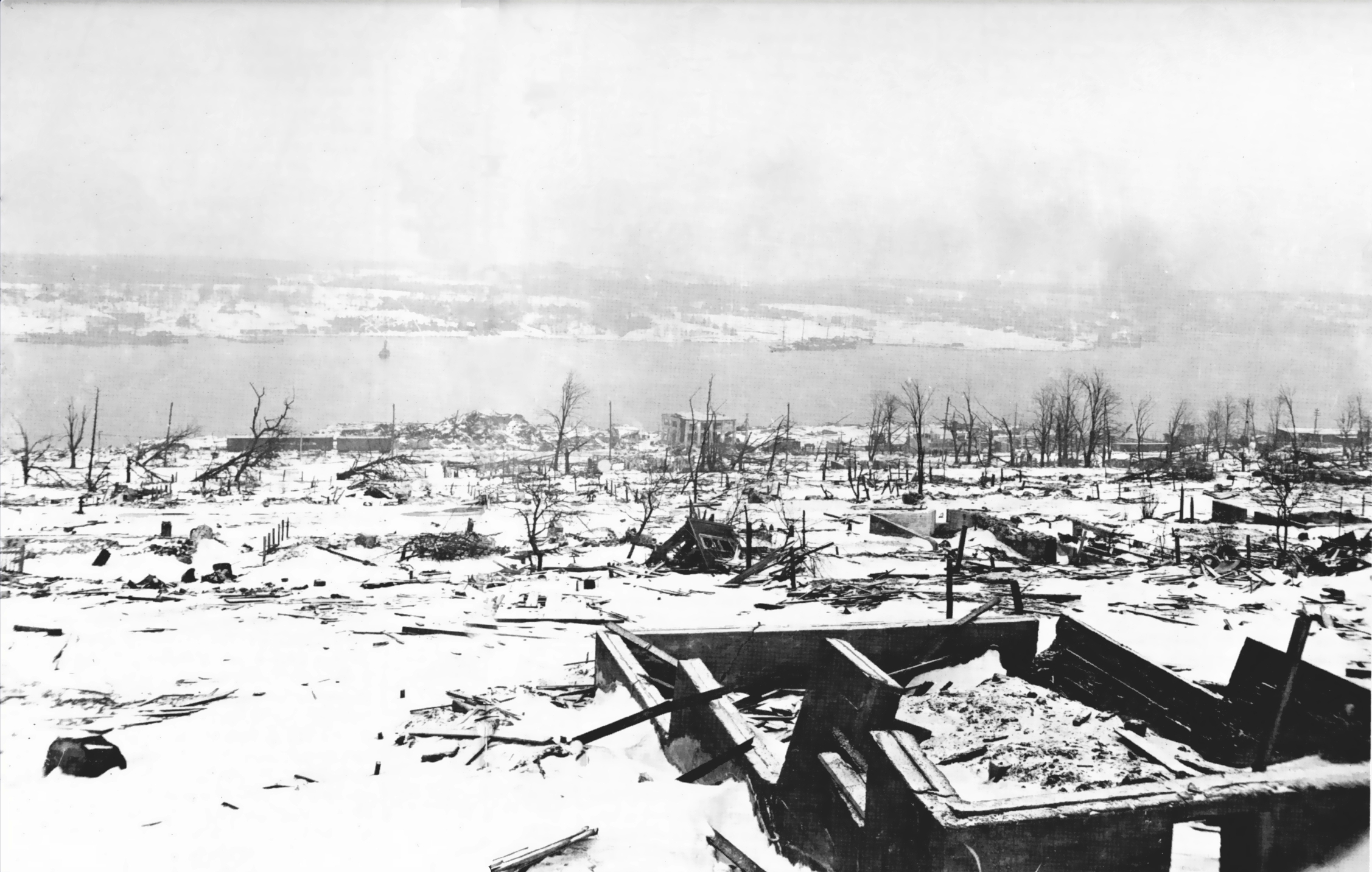
View of the devastated neighbourhood of Richmond in Halifax after the Halifax Explosion

On Thursday, December 6, 1917, the city of Halifax was devastated by the huge detonation of a French cargo ship, loaded with wartime explosives. It had accidentally collided with a Norwegian ship in "The Narrows" section of the Halifax Harbour. Approximately 2,000 people were killed by debris, fires, or collapsed buildings, and over 9,000 people were injured. This is still the world's largest man-made accidental explosion.

=== Interwar Period and the Second World War ===
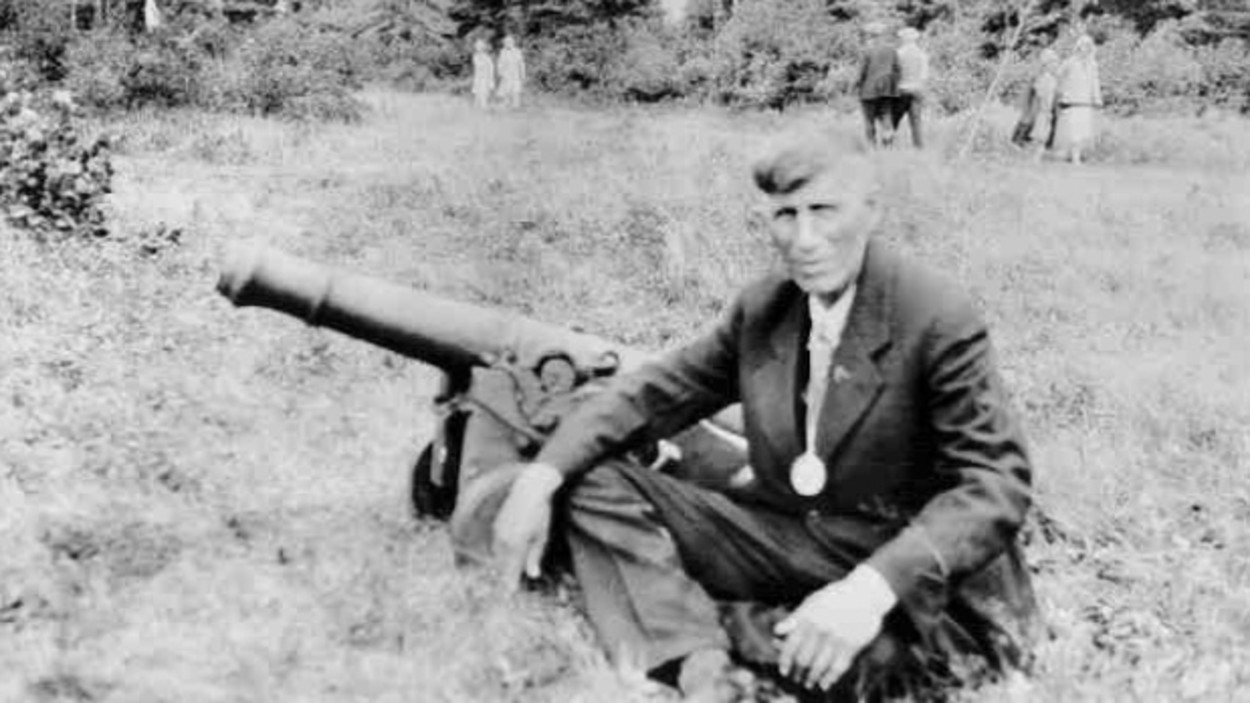
Photo of Gabriel Sylliboy in 1930. Sylliboy helped fight for recognition of a treaty signed between the Mi'kmaq and Nova Scotia in 1752.

Gabriel Sylliboy was the first Mi'kmaq elected as Grand Chief (1919) and the first to fight for treaty recognition – specifically, the Treaty of 1752 – in the Supreme Court of Nova Scotia (1929).

Nova Scotia was hard hit by the worldwide Great Depression that began in 1929 as demand plunged for coal and steel, as did the prices for fish and lumber. Prosperity returned in World War II, especially as Halifax again became a major staging point for convoys to Britain. Liberal premier Angus L. Macdonald dominated the political scene as premier (1933–1940 and 1945–1954). Macdonald dealt with the mass unemployment of the 1930s by putting the jobless to work on highway projects. He felt direct government relief payments would weaken moral character, undermine self-respect and discourage personal initiative. However, he also faced the reality that his financially strapped government could not afford to participate fully in federal relief programs that required matching contributions from the provinces.

The Antigonish Movement emerged offering a "middle way" to helping people distressed hit by the depression through cooperative ventures under popular control. It was a Catholic operation started by Reverend Moses Coady of St Francis Xavier University in 1928. He sought a Church-approved alternative to socialism or capitalism. The cooperatives were organized at the grass roots and brought together fishermen, farmers, miners and factory workers, especially in the eastern districts. They set up local fish processing plants, credit unions, housing co-ops, and co-operative stores. Ownership and control was in the hands of the people directly involved It declined after 1950.

During World War II, thousands of Nova Scotians went overseas. Halifax became a key staging point for the Atlantic convoys, and the Navy base at CFB Halifax became the HQs of Rear Admiral Leonard W. Murray during the Battle of the Atlantic. One Nova Scotian, Mona Louise Parsons, joined the Dutch resistance and was eventually captured and imprisoned by the Nazis for almost four years.

=== Latter 20th century (1945–2000) ===
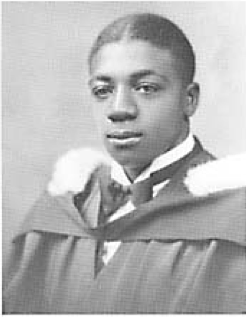
William Pearly Oliver in 1934. Oliver led the Nova Scotia Association for the Advancement of Colored People when it was first formed in 1945.

Led by minister William Pearly Oliver, the Nova Scotia Association for the Advancement of Colored People was formed in 1945 out of the Cornwallis Street Baptist Church. The organization was intent of improving the standard of living for Black Nova Scotians. The organization also attempted to improve black-white relations in co-operation with private and governmental agencies. The organization was joined by 500 Black Nova Scotians. By 1956, the NSAACP had branches in Halifax, Cobequid Road, Digby, Wegymouth Falls, Beechville, Inglewooe, Hammonds Plains and Yarmouth. Preston and Africville branches were added in 1962, the same year New Road, Cherrybrook, and Preston East requested branches. In 1947, the Association successfully took the case of Viola Desmond to the Supreme Court of Canada It also pressured the Children's Hospital in Halifax to allow for black women to become nurses; it advocated for inclusion and challenged racist curriculum in the Department of Education. The Association also developed an Adult Education program with the government department.

After the war Angus L. Macdonald initiated large-scale spending programs for such services as health, education, labor union protection measures, and pensions.

Conservative Robert L. Stanfield served as premier during 1956–1967. The pragmatic Stanfield, though in favor of some government intervention in economic affairs, was cautious about social policy and was unwilling to promote the welfare state. Nevertheless, new hospitals were built, funded by a sales tax. After 1960 there was increased emphasis on provincial assistance for local municipalities in health and education, with finances for university expansion. Generally, Stanfield, though a conservative, took a positive view of the state's role in helping citizens overcome poverty, ill-health, and discrimination and accepted the need to raise taxes to pay for such services.

On September 2, 1998, Swissair Flight 111 crashed into the Atlantic Ocean in St. Margaret's Bay. All 229 people on board the McDonnell Douglas MD-11 were killed. There are two memorials dedicated to the victims. One memorial is located at The Whalesback just northwest of Peggy's Cove, and the other is located at Bayswater, the recovery site of the aircraft's wreckage.

==== Provincial relations with Acadians and Mi'kmaqs in the late 20th century ====
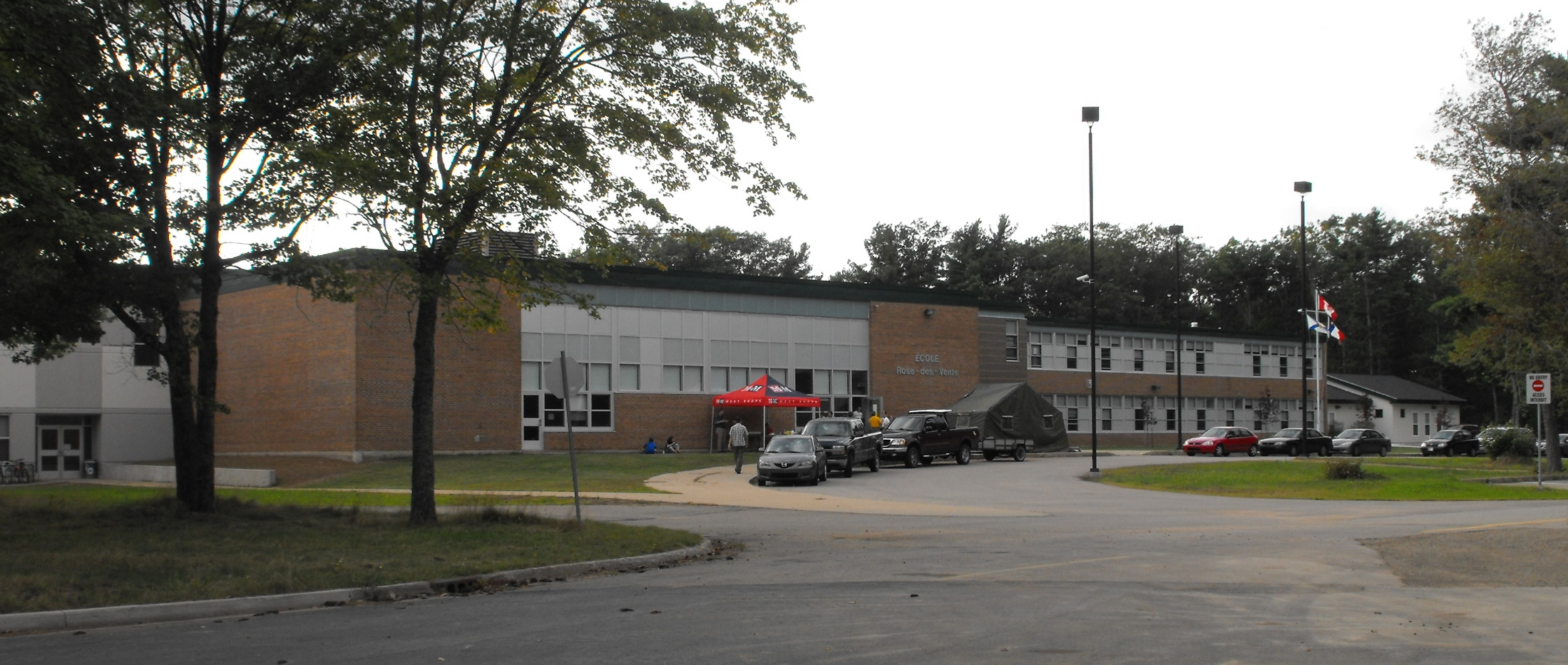
École Rose-des-Vents in 2009. The school is operated by Conseil scolaire acadien provincial, a French-language school board established in 1996.

The Acadian Federation of Nova Scotia (Fédération acadienne de la Nouvelle-Écosse) was created in 1968 with a mission to "promote the growth and global development of the Acadian and Francophone community of Nova Scotia." The Fédération acadienne is the official voice of the Acadian and Francophone population of Nova Scotia. The Fédération acadienne presently has 29 regional, provincial and institutional members. In 1996, the Federation was instrumental in establishing the Acadian School Board (Conseil scolaire acadien provincial) in the province.

In 1997, the Mi'kmaq-Nova Scotia-Canada Tripartite Forum was established. The Nova Scotia government and the Mi’kmaq community have made the Miꞌkmaw Kinaꞌmatnewey, which is a very successful First Nation Education Program in Canada. In 1982, the first Mi’kmaq operated school opened in Nova Scotia. By 1997, all education for Mi’kmaq on reserves were given the responsibility for their own education. There are now 11 band run schools in Nova Scotia. Now Nova Scotia has the highest rate of retention of aboriginal students in schools in the country. More than half the teachers are Mi’kmaq. From 2011 to 2012 there was a 25 per cent increase of Mi’kmaq students going to university. Atlantic Canada has the highest rate of aboriginal students attending university in the country.

== 21st century ==
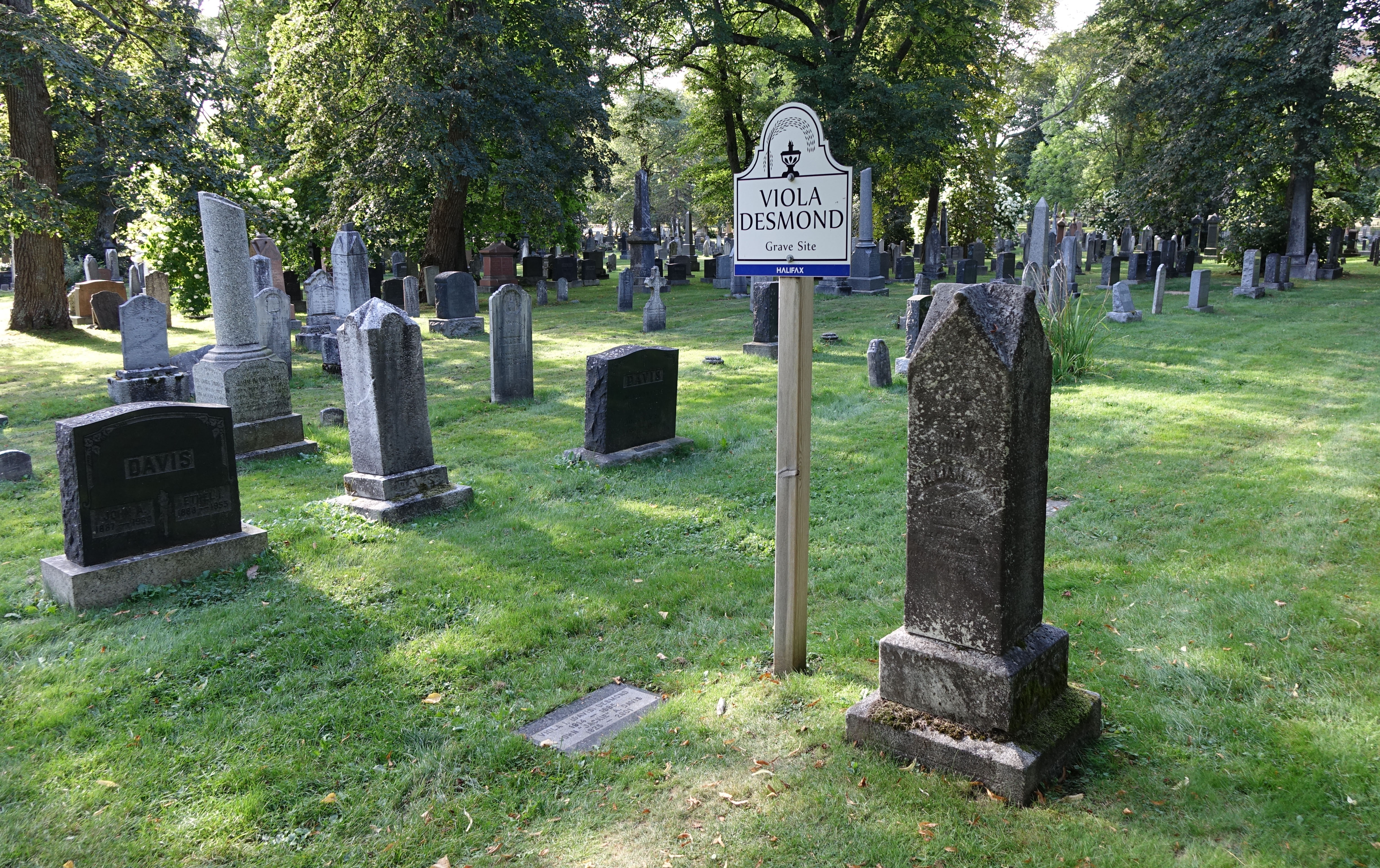
Headstone and signage marking Viola Desmond's grave in 2018. In 2010 she was posthumously pardoned by the provincial lieutenant governor.

On April 14, 2010, the Lieutenant Governor of Nova Scotia, Mayann Francis, on the advice of her premier, invoked the Royal Prerogative and granted Viola Desmond a posthumous free pardon, the first such to be granted in Canada.

The free pardon, an extraordinary remedy granted under the Royal Prerogative of Mercy only in the rarest of circumstances and the first one granted posthumously, differs from a simple pardon in that it is based on innocence and recognizes that a conviction was in error. The government of Nova Scotia also apologised. This initiative happened by Desmond's younger sister Wanda Robson, and a professor of Cape Breton University, Graham Reynolds, working with the Government of Nova Scotia to ensure that Desmond's name was cleared and the government admitted its error. In honour of Desmond, the provincial government has named the first Nova Scotia Heritage Day after her.

In the same year, on August 31, the governments of Canada and Nova Scotia signed a historic agreement with the Mi'kmaq Nation, establishing a process whereby the federal government must consult with the Mi'kmaq Grand Council before engaging in any activities or projects that affect the Mi'kmaq in Nova Scotia. This covers most, if not all, actions these governments might take within that jurisdiction. This is the first such collaborative agreement in Canadian history including all the First Nations within an entire province.

=== 2020 killing spree ===
In the hours between April 18 and 19, 2020, a spree killing consisting of shootings and arsons took place across several communities in Nova Scotia. 22 people were killed, including a Royal Canadian Mounted Police (RCMP) officer, before another officer killed the perpetrator, 51-year-old Gabriel Wortman, following a car chase. It was the deadliest rampage in Canadian history.

== See also ==
- Acadiensis, scholarly history journal covering Atlantic Canada
- Nova Scotia Federation of Labour
- List of National Historic Sites in Nova Scotia
- History of Acadia
- Black Nova Scotians
- Military history of Nova Scotia
- Military history of the Mi’kmaq People
- Military history of the Maliseet people
- Military history of the Acadians
- History of the Acadians
- History of the Halifax Regional Municipality
- Royal Nova Scotia Historical Society

== Notes ==
A.^{A} In 1765, the county of Sunbury was created, and included the territory of present-day New Brunswick and eastern Maine as far as the Penobscot River.
B.^{B} Lieutenant Governor Sir Richard Hughes stated in a dispatch to Lord Germaine that "rebel cruisers" made the attack.
C.^{C} Among the annual festivals of the old times, now lost sight of, was the celebration of St. Aspinquid's Day, known as the Indian Saint. St. Aspinquid appeared in the Nova Scotia almanacks from 1774 to 1786. The festival was celebrated on or immediately after the last quarter of the moon in the month of May. The tide being low at that time, many of the principal inhabitants of the town, on these occasions, assembled on the shore of the North West Arm and partook of a dish of clam soup, the clams being collected on the spot at low water. There is a tradition that during the American troubles when agents of the revolted colonies were active to gain over the good people of Halifax, in the year 1786, were celebrating St. Aspinquid, the wine having been circulated freely, the Union Jack was suddenly hauled down and replaced by the Stars and Stripes. This was soon reversed, but all those persons who held public offices immediately left the grounds, and St. Aspinquid was never after celebrated at Halifax.
D.^{D} According to Thomas Akins, a portrait of Thomas Andrew Lumisden Strange by Benjamin West hung in the legislature of Province House (Nova Scotia) in 1847 that now hangs in the National Gallery of Scotland
E.^{E} Rural poverty is the theme of Rusty Bittermann, Robert A. Mackinnon, and Graeme Wynn's Of inequality and interdependence in the Nova Scotian countryside, 1850–70.
F.^{F} This conflict is also referred to as "Anglo French Rivalry of 1749–63" and War of British Conquest.

== Bibliography ==
=== 18th–19th century publications ===
- Statutes at large:
  - 1758 to 1804
  - 1805 to 1816
  - 1817 to 1826
  - 1827 to 1835
  - Statutes to 1826 (?)
- by Thomas Beamish Akins:
  - Acadian French. Selections from the public documents of the province of Nova Scotia (1869)
  - Papers related to the French encroachment on Nova Scotia (1749–1754), and the War in North America (1754–1761), Vol. 3
  - Papers related to the first establishment of a Representative Assembly in Nova Scotia (1755–1761), Vol. 5
- by Beamish Murdoch:
  - A History of Nova-Scotia, Or Acadie. Vol. I. Halifax: J. Barnes. 1865.
  - A History of Nova-Scotia, Or Acadie. Vol. II. Halifax: J. Barnes. 1866.
  - A History of Nova-Scotia, Or Acadie. Vol. III. Halifax: J. Barnes. 1867.
- by John George Bourinot (younger):
  - Builders of Nova Scotia : a historical review, with an appendix containing copies of rare documents relating to the early days of the province
  - Historical and Descriptive Account of Cape Breton, and of its memorials of the French regime
- Nova Scotia Illustrated 1895

=== 20th–21st century publications ===
- Ian McKay and Robin Bates. In the Province of History: The Making of the Public Past in Twentieth-Century Nova Scotia (2010)
- Dr. Ed Whitcomb. A Short History of Nova Scotia. Ottawa. From Sea To Sea Enterprises, 2009. ISBN 978-0-9694667-9-6. 72 pp.
- Duncan Campbell, History of Nova Scotia, for Schools BiblioLife, 2009 ISBN 1-115-65980-4, excerpt
- Grenier, John (2008). The Far Reaches of Empire: War in Nova Scotia, 1710–1760. University of Oklahoma Press. ISBN 978-0-8061-3876-3.
- McKay, Ian (1994). The quest of the folk : antimodernism and cultural selection in twentieth-century Nova Scotia. McGill-Queen's University Press. ISBN 0-7735-1179-2.
- Girard, Philip; Phillips, Jim (2004). The Supreme Court of Nova Scotia, 1754-2004: From Imperial Bastion to Provincial Oracle. Vol. 2. University of Toronto Press. ISBN 0-8020-8021-9.
- Sandberg, Anders; Clancy, Peter (2000). Against the Grain: Foresters and Politics in Nova Scotia. UBC Press. ISBN 0-7748-0765-2.

=== Collections of the Nova Scotia Historical Society ===
- Articles and Index 1878–1910
- Articles 1878–2006
- NS Historical Society 1879 Volume 1.
- NS Historical Society 1881 Volume 2.
- NS Historical Society 1882–83 Volume 3.
- NS Historical Society 1884 Volume 4.
- NS Historical Society 1886–87 Volume 5.
- NS Historical Society 1888 Volume 6.
- NS Historical Society 1889–91 Volume 7.
- NS Historical Society 1892–94 Volume 8.
- Louisbourg - An Historical Sketch (1894)
- NS Historical Society 1895 Volume 9.
- NS Historical Society 1896–98 Volume 10.
- NS Historical Society 1899–1900 Volume 11.
- NS Historical Society 1905 Volume 12.
- NS Historical Society 1908 Volume 13.
- NS Historical Society 1910 Volume 14.
- NS Historical Society 1911 Volume 15.
- NS Historical Society 1912 Volume 16.
- NS Historical Society 1913 Volume 17.
- NS Historical Society 1914 Volume 18.
- NS Historical Society 1918 Volume 19.
- NS Historical Society 1921 Volume 20.
- NS Historical Society 1927 Volume 27.
- The memorial sundial at Annapolis Royal: paper read before the Nova Scotia Historical Society, at Halifax, NS December the sixth, 1918 (1918)
