= List of ships named Research =

Several ships have borne the name Research:

- HCS Research (1823) was a vessel that the British East India Company employed for exploration
- Research (1861 ship) was a ship launched in 1861 at Yarmouth, Nova Scotia

== See also ==
- Research vessel
- History of research ships
- List of research vessels by country
