= Thibault Jacquot-Paratte =

Acadian writer and musician

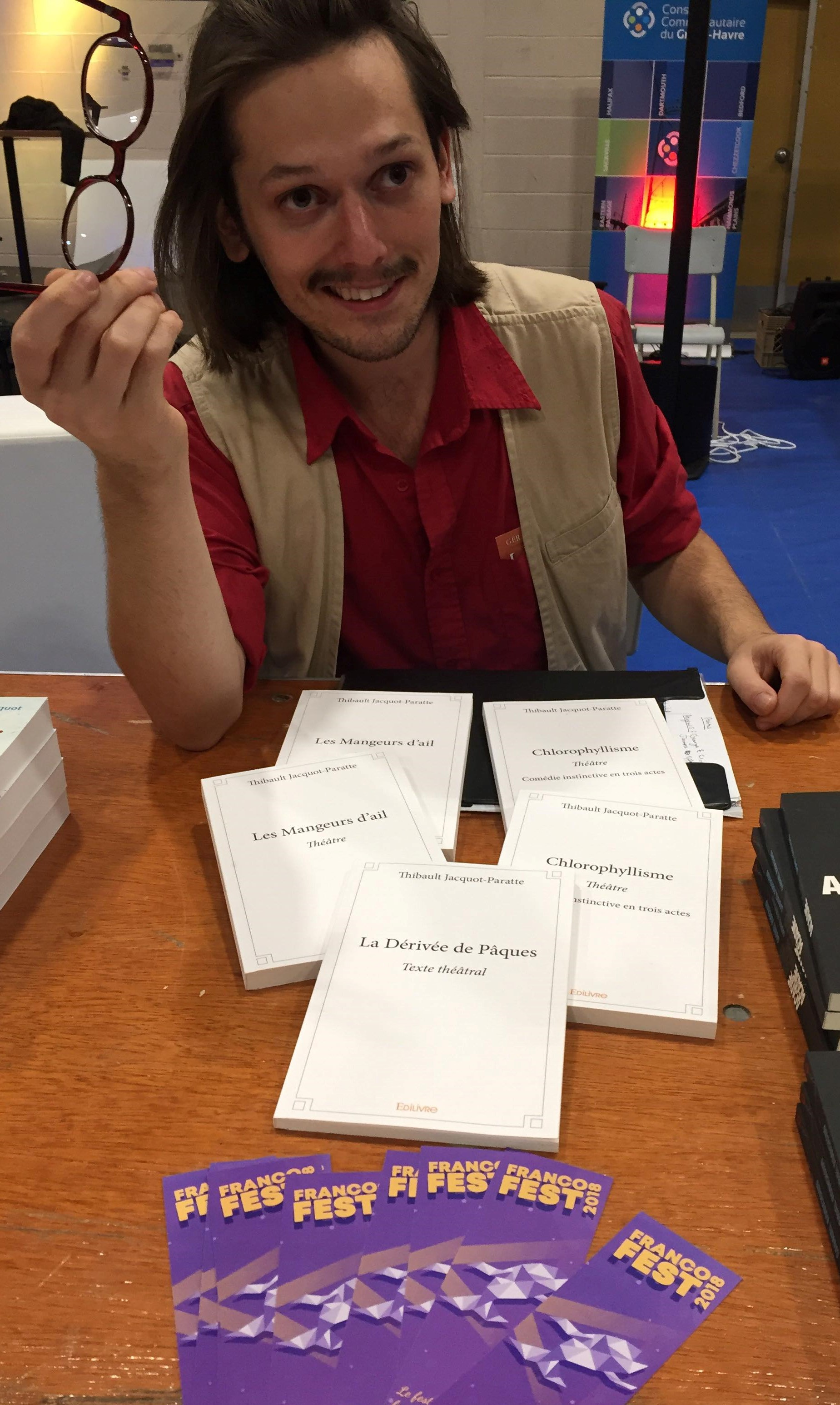
- Thibault Jacquot-Paratte at the 2018 Francofest Halifax Book Fair
- Born: March 10, 1993 (age 33); Kentville, Nova Scotia, Canada
- Education: Sorbonne University, University of Tromsø, University of Vaasa
- Occupations: Writer, musician
- Spouse: Augustė Jasiulytė
- Writing career
- Period: 2010–present

Thibault Jacquot-Paratte is an Acadian writer and musician, born in Kentville, Nova Scotia, of Franco-Swiss parentage. He writes both in French and English.

== Biography ==
Raised in the minority Francophone community of the Annapolis Valley, Nova Scotia, Thibault Jacquot-Paratte started performing songs and reading publicly as a teenager. During that time, he was also active with different local organizations, among which the provincial youth council (Conseil Jeunesse Provincial), which in 2010 invited him as their official poet during the annual assembly of the Acadian Federation of Nova Scotia. He notably organized, along with LGBTQ+ activist Charles MacDougall, bi-monthly French-language poetry readings at Greenwood's Tan Café during the years 2010–2011, as well as free performances in Stronach Park, in Kingston, NS. In 2011, he received the Frog prize at the Frogstock music competition in Pomquet, NS, and was chosen as a representative of the francophone community at the 2011 International day for the elimination of racism, broadcast live from the Mi'Kmaw Native Friendship Center, in Halifax. During this time, he also played with different bands, such as Zenass, and frequently shared the stage with composer Gavin Fraser and recording artist Jonah Richard Guimond.

After an internship at the Fondation AfricAvenir international / Exchange and dialogue in Bonabéri, Cameroon, and extensive travelling, he was admitted to study Scandinavian studies at the Sorbonne. In 2012, he was invited by the feminist journal Le Pan Poétique des Muses to participate to a public reading at the University of Paris III, as part of the Printemps des poètes ("Poets spring" – an annual event across France). He was also able to participate in the Greek theatre troupe Démodocos. After completing his bachelor's in 2015, he received a CIMO scholarship to follow a summer program at the University of Vaasa. He studied for a year at the Arctic University in Tromsø, and received another scholarship to study in a summer program at the Askov Folkehøjskole, before returning to Paris in order to complete his master's (2017).

During the winter of 2016–2017, his first three plays were published in French. In 2017, he received another scholarship to complete a fall semester at the Askov Folkehøjskole, where he completed a student film, Tallinn, hvor smuk du er with Augustė Jasiulytė.

After returning to Canada, he worked as coordinator for Oui 98.5 FM in Halifax, where he also hosted the show Les blues du lundi ("The Monday blues") under the assumed name Vieux bluesman John MacMachin Graisse-de-bine.

In the spring of 2019, he was a semi-finalist in the Caraquet song contest, and a finalist at the Scène Stella song contest in Nova Scotia. In the summer of 2019, he was selected by the National Acadian society to be Pavilion Poet at the 2019 Acadian World Congress. Later in 2019, he was hired by the Théâtre DesAssimilés to direct and translate his own play, Les mangeurs d'ail (The garlic eaters) in a bilingual (French-English) premier.

In the fall of 2020, his poetry collection Cries of somewhere’s soil was released, and stimulated mediatic discussions about English-language Acadian literature. This was followed by a miscellaneous containing poetry and short prose, Souvenirs et Fragments in 2022. His novel A dream is a notion of, which had reportedly already been circulating through unofficial distributors, was also published in 2022. In 2022, he co-directed Il y a des bombes qui tombent sur Kyiv, anthologie pour la paix with photographer Charlotte Lakits, a charity anthology to raise funds for Ukraine and Ukrainian refugees, as a result of the 2022 Russian invasion of Ukraine.

== Works ==
=== Books ===
- Antéaurore, Poetry, Éditions Basic Bruegel Editions, Moncton, New Brunswick, Canada, February 2026
- Awoken before the evening should, Novel, Cyberwit, Allahabad, India, May 2025
- A dream is a notion of, Novel, Cyberwit, Allahabad, India, May 2022
- Souvenirs et Fragments, Miscellaneous, Éditions Édilivre, Paris, France, April 2022
- Cries of somewhere's soil, Poetry, Cyberwit, Allahabad, India, September 2020
- Chlorophyllisme, Drama, éditions Édilivre, Paris, France, January 2017.
- Les mangeurs d'ail, Drama, éditions Édilivre, Paris, France, January 2017.
- La dérivée de pâques, Drama, éditions Édilivre, Paris, France, December 2016.

=== In anthologies ===
- Poetry in : Il y a des bombes qui tombent sur Kyiv, anthologie pour la paix, Éditions Lisvrai, Grafton NS., Canada, May 2022
- Poetry in: Behold, Polar Expressions Publishing, Maple Ridge, BC, Canada, December 2021
- Short story: Sketches of a city in the sumertime Pt. 1, in: In the mist, Polar Expressions Publishing, Maple Ridge, BC, Canada, December 2021
- Short story: Le smog, in: Des plumes à l’action : justice climatique, anthology published by Oxfam-Ul, Montreal, QC, Canada, November 2021
- Poems in: Galaxy, anthology of contemporary poetry, Edizioni Universum, Trento, Italy, August 2021
- Short story: On s'est croisés dans la rue, in : Textes noirs, supplément à l'anthologie Poulpe Noir, Association Campus Miskatonic, Verdun, France, July 2021
- Short story: L'Odalme, in: Solstice d'été : nouvelles fantastiques, Éditions inusitées, Lévi, Qc., Canada, May 2021
- Poems in: Dialoguer en poésie : recueil 2021, Association Dialoguer en poésie / Le 122, Lectoure, France, May 2021
- Three short stories in: Résonances/3, Jacques Flament éditions, collection Carré noir, La-Neuville-aux-joûtes, France, April 2021
- Poems in: Open Heart Forgery 10th anniversary anthology, Open Heart Forgery, Halifax, NS., Canada, March 2020
- Short story: We smoked salvia, in : Moose House Stories Vol. 1, Moose House Press, Annapolis Royal, Ns., Dec. 2019
- Three short stories in: BREF!, Éditions du Blé, Winnipeg, Manitoba, Canada, autumn 2017
- Poems in: Cities of gold, young Canadian poets anthology, Polar expressions publishing, Maple Ridge, BC, Canada, Spring 2011

=== In journals/reviews ===
- Instant, in : Pro/p(r)ose magazine, Metz, France, June 2022
- Poems from Poèmes de faim de vie, in : Le Pan Poétique des Muses | Revue féministe, internationale & multilingue de poésie entre théories & pratiques : « L'éphémère aux féminin, masculin & autre », Recueil collectif des périodiques féministes de l'association SIÉFÉGP, April 2022
- Poem : Ma fille va dominer le monde, in : Le Pan poétique des muses|Revue féministe, internationale & multilingue de poésie entre théories & pratiques : Évènement poéféministe|« Un Pan de Poèmes pour Toutes à l'École & La Journée Internationale des Droits des Filles 2021 » N° 10, Autumn 2021
- Poem: Thrown out of Peace and Friendship, The Nova Scotia Advocate, Halifax, Ns., 18 September 2021
- Poetry: Excerpts from Poèmes de faim de vie and Douze chants hérétiques, in : Le Pan poétique des muses | Revue féministe, internationale & multilingue de poésie entre théories & pratiques : Lettre n°16, August 2021
- Poem : Jeté hors de peace and friendship, Le Courrier de la Nouvelle-Écosse, Pointe-de-l'Église, NS., Canada, August 27, 2021
- Poems in : Pro/p(r)ose numéro thémathique Je(ux), Pro/p(r)ose magazine, Metz, France, July 2021
- Poem: À la lueur des flambeaux, Le Pan poétique des muses|Revue féministe, internationale & multilingue de poésie entre théories & pratiques : Événement poétique|Le Printemps des Poètes « Les femmes et le désir en poésie »
- Short story: Lucien, published by: Associazione Culturale Matera : Energheia, Italy December 2019
- Short story: Tatouages temporaires, in: Revue Ancrage, No.19, winter 2019, Moncton, NB, Canada
- Poems in Open Heart Forgery, April 2017, Halifax, NS., Canada
- Short story: Le car touristique, in: Revue Ancrage No.13, summer 2017, Moncton, NB, Canada
- Poem in: Échos, Revue Ancrage, April 2017, Moncton, NB, Canada
- Poem in: Une ville un livre, partie 2, Revue Ancrage, August 2016, Moncton, NB, Canada
- Poems in: Artichaut magazine no. 6 Hybrides, Montreal, May 2016
- Poems in Open Heart Forgery, March 2016, Halifax, NS., Canada
- Poèmes engagés, in: Le Pan poétique des muses|Revue internationale de poésie entre théories & pratiques : « Le printemps féminin de la poésie », Hors-Série n°1, May 2013
- Poems in: Estuary 13.2, Spring 2012, Wolfville, NS., Canada

=== Academic/critical work ===
- Literary critique: Trésors retrouvés de notre littérature : La dernière ligne droite de Vittorio Frigerio, Revue Astheure, November 2021
- Literary critique: Trésors retrouvés de notre littérature : La poetrie de l’écrivante de Julie Aubé, Revue Astheure, October 2021
- Literary critique: Trésors retrouvés de notre littérature : Mon théâtre de Jules Boudreau, Revue Astheure, October 2021
- Literary critique: Memoriam, quelques notes sur les débuts littéraires de Michel Picard, club de lecture d'un océan à l'autre, Regroupement des éditeurs Franco-Canadiens (REFC), May 2021
- Regards critiques : observations brèves sur la relève littéraire en Acadie, in : Cahier colloque, Les médias Francophones sous toutes leurs coutures, un an après, Sainte-Anne University/Le Courrier de la Nouvelle-Écosse, October 2020
- Gabija Enciūtė : poète et activiste lituanienne : Le Pan poétique des muses|Revue féministe, internationale & multilingue de poésie entre théories & pratiques : Megalesia 2020, July 2020
- Second year master's thesis : Movements for and against the legalization of cannabis in Norway between 2000 and 2016, with focus on northern Norway (in French), presented at the university of Paris IV Sorbonne, June 2017
- First year master's thesis : Folklore and young Norwegians, presented the university of Paris IV Sorbonne, June 2016
- Participation: Visions d'avenir : manifeste du volet politique du grand rassemblement jeunesse 2014 (“Visions for the future: political manifesto of the political component of the 2014 grand youth rally”), collective pamphlet, published by the New Brunswick Youth Federation (FJFNB), September 2014.
- Theater critique : La barque le soir (Théâtre de l’Odéon, directed by Claude Régis), Service Culturel Paris-Sorbonne, October 2012
- Canadian interactions during the Crimean war, 1853 - 1856 (in French), in: Canadian notes, revue of the faculty of Canadian studies, Volgograd University, Volgograd, Russia, Spring 2010

=== Recordings ===
- Album photo (2018)
- More acoustic demos (2018)
- « Tallinn hvor smuk du er » Original soundtrack (2017)
- Musique originale du film La culbute de Sainte Agathe (2015)
- Cheaply recorded acoustic demos (2014)
- Good times with David and Thibs (with David Litalien - 2013)
- Progressions autrement (2012)
- De fuck que c'est sa? (2012)
