= Maritime Rights Movement =

Political movement in Canada

The Maritime Rights Movement arose in the 1920s in response to perceived unfair economic policies in Canada that were affecting the economies of the provinces of New Brunswick, Nova Scotia, and Prince Edward Island. At a time of rural protest in Canada from Ontario to the Prairie Provinces, the movement was a broad-based protest demanding better treatment of The Maritimes from the federal government. It was centred at Saint John, New Brunswick, where the city's business leaders politicized the economic crisis and solidified their economic and political leadership.

The movement attempted to address issues relating to interprovincial trade barriers, freight rates on railways, and various other indicators that were believed to have caused an economic decline since the early 20th century that was worsened by World War I.

The Royal Commission on Maritime Claims was established in 1926 by Canadian prime minister William Lyon Mackenzie King and was chaired by the British businessman and industrialist Sir Andrew Rae Duncan (thus the nickname the "Duncan Commission"). It was provided with a mandate "to examine 'from a national standpoint... all the factors which peculiarly affect the economic position' of the Maritime provinces and to make 'recommendations to alleviate such grievances' as might exist."

The Duncan Commission attempted to address the issues raised by the Maritime Rights Movement and made various recommendations to lower interprovincial and international tariffs, decrease railway freight rates, and change other federal policies to help the regional economy. The result was to consolidate the colonial relationship between Ottawa and the Maritimes, increasing centralized control and regional dependency and relegating the Maritimes to the status of "client states".
