= Sunbury County, Nova Scotia =

Coordinates: 46°0′19.6″N 66°25′16.5″W

Sunbury County was a county in Nova Scotia. The county ceased to exist when the province of New Brunswick was created in 1784.

The county was created in 1765, alongside a formal enlargement of Cumberland County north and westward (taking in present-day Westmoreland and Albert Counties, New Brunswick). Sunbury County's seat and its court of general sessions were established at Campobello Island, in Passamaquoddy Bay.

Campobello was fairly central on the coast under its purview, as Sunbury included what the Province of Massachusetts regarded as the eastern portion of its district of Maine. (In practice, neither Boston nor Halifax was interested in expending energy or money to administer the area and so the geographic overlap was permitted to exist.)

In 1784, in part because of the immigration to Nova Scotia of many thousands of Loyalists refugees, Sunbury County, with the newer, mainland portion of Cumberland, became the Colony of New Brunswick. British recognition of American independence had necessitated the turnover of the western third of Sunbury to the District of Maine, which was still part of Massachusetts.

After much redefinition and reduction in subsequent decades, there remains in central New Brunswick a county holding the name Sunbury.
