= Acadian Federation of Nova Scotia =

The Acadian Federation of Nova Scotia (Fédération acadienne de la Nouvelle-Écosse) was created in 1968 with a mission to "promote the growth and global development of the Acadian and Francophone community of Nova Scotia."

The Fédération acadienne is the official voice of the Acadian and Francophone population of Nova Scotia. The Fédération acadienne presently has 29 regional, provincial and institutional members.

In 1996, the Federation was instrumental in establishing the Acadian School Board (Conseil scolaire acadien provincial) in the province.

== Members ==
=== Provincial Members ===
- Association acadienne des artistes de la Nouvelle-Écosse
- Association des juristes d'expression française de la Nouvelle-Écosse
- Association des radios communautaires de l'Atlantique
- Centre provincial de Ressources préscolaire
- Comité provincial des Jeux de l'Acadie, région Nouvelle-Écosse
- Conseil coopératif acadien de la Nouvelle-Écosse
- Conseil de développement économique de la Nouvelle-Écosse
- Conseil jeunesse provincial
- Équipe d'alphabétisation de la Nouvelle-Écosse
- Fédération culturelle acadienne de la Nouvelle-Écosse
- Fédération des femmes acadiennes de la Nouvelle-Écosse
- Fédération des parents acadiens de la Nouvelle-Écosse
- Société de Presse acadienne
- Regroupement des Aînées et Aînées de la Nouvelle-Écosse
- Réseau Santé Nouvelle-Écosse
- Société Maison acadienne
- Société promotion Grand-Pré

=== Regional Members ===
- Conseil acadien de Par-en-Bas, Argyle
- Société Saint-Pierre, Chéticamp
- Société acadienne de Clare
- Conseil communautaire du Grand-Havre, Halifax/Dartmouth
- Société acadienne Sainte-Croix, Pomquet
- Centre communautaire culturel La Picasse, Richmond
- Association du Centre communautaire de la Rive-Sud
- Centre scolaire communautaire Étoile de l'Acadie, Sydney
- Centre communautaire francophone de Truro
- Association francophone de la Vallée d'Annapolis

=== Institutional Members ===
- Conseil scolaire acadien provincial
- Université Sainte-Anne
