= Research (1861 ship) =

History

Canada
- Name: Research
- Owner: Thomas Killam
- Port of registry: Yarmouth, Nova Scotia
- Builder: John Richards, Yarmouth, Nova Scotia
- Launched: November 18, 1861
- Fate: Sold 1873 in London, England

General characteristics
- Tonnage: 1460 Gross
- Length: 200 ft.
- Beam: 41 ft.
- Depth: 30 ft
- Decks: 3
- Propulsion: Sail
- Sail plan: Ship

Research was a full-rigged ship built in Yarmouth, Nova Scotia which was famous for a determined and courageous crew who replaced her rudder eight times to survive a crippling North Atlantic storm in 1866. Research was built in 1861 for the fleet of Thomas Killam and was the largest vessel built to that date in Yarmouth County, Nova Scotia. In the fall of 1866 on a voyage from Quebec to Glasgow, Scotland, her rudder was badly damaged in a sudden violent storm as the ship left the Gulf of Saint Lawrence at the beginning of her voyage. The rudder subsequently broke off entirely but was replaced by eight different jury rigged rudders which allowed the drifting and battered vessel to cross the ocean and reach her destination after 88 days. George Churchill, the captain of Research and Aaron Churchill, the first mate who carried out most of the repairs in the water, were celebrated for their courage, skill and determination. They both enjoyed the nickname "Rudder Churchill" for the rest of their careers. The ship was sold to owners in Saint John, New Brunswick in 1872 and then sold out of British registry a year later.
