= Kevin Barlow (disambiguation) =

Kevin Barlow, was a British-Australian drugs smuggler who was executed in Malaysia in 1986.

Kevin Barlow may also refer to:

- J. Kevin Barlow, AIDS activist
- Kevan Barlow (born 1979), American footballer

== See also ==
- Kevin Barrow, Trinidadian footballer
