= Lennox Island =

Lennox Island may refer to:

- Lennox Island (Prince Edward Island), a small island off the north shore of the Canadian province of Prince Edward Island
- Lennox Island First Nation, a part of the Mi'kmaq Nation and located on Lennox Island
