= Lennox Island 5 =

Mi'kmaq reserve in Prince Edward Island, Canada

Coordinates: 46°37′16″N 63°54′11″W

Lennox Island 5 in Prince Edward Island

Lennox Island 5 is a Mi'kmaq reserve located in Prince County, Prince Edward Island. There are currently no residents.

Lennox Island 5 is located in East Bideford, Prince Edward Island, approximately 3 km (1.9 mi) west of the island named Lennox Island.

It is administratively part of the Lennox Island First Nation.

== History ==
The Mi'kmaq have inhabited the lands comprising present-day Prince Edward Island for over 10,000 years.

The reserve named Lennox Island 1 is notable for being the first reserve in Canada owned by its people, having been purchased in 1878 by the Aboriginal Protection Society.

The land known as Lennox Island 5 was acquired by the Lennox Island First Nation in the early 2000s.
