= Mi'kmaq flag =

Indigenous flag

The Mi'kmaq flag is displayed horizontally or vertically.

The Mi'kmaq flag is the flag of the Mi'kmaq people.

== Description and symbolism ==
The Mi'kmaq flag consists of four main elements:

- A white background, representing purity of creation.
- A red cross, representing mankind and infinity.
- The sun/star, representing the forces of the day.
- The moon, representing the forces of the night.

The flag is commonly referred to as simply the Mi'kmaq flag. The flag may also be referred to as the Santé Mawiómi flag, the Grand Council flag, or the Mi'kmaq National flag.

According to some sources, the flag is meant to be hung vertically, but it is commonly hung horizontally with the star aligned to the upper-left corner.

== History ==
The Mi'kmaq flag was raised for the first time on 4 October 1900 in Restigouche, Quebec. It was raised in Halifax, Nova Scotia for the first time in 1901.

The flag was traditionally flown during meetings of the Grand Council. It is now flown regularly, particularly on Treaty Day and other events which commemorate the Mi'kmaq people. The flag is often flown across Nova Scotia in honour of Mi'kmaq History Month in October.

In 2017, Acadia University began flying the Mi'kmaq flag above their University Hall, where it is a permanent fixture alongside the flags of Canada, Nova Scotia, and the university. The flag was similarly raised at Saint Mary's University the following year. The Mi'kmaq flag was permanently raised at Moncton City Hall in New Brunswick in 2019, followed by the town hall of Kensington, Prince Edward Island in 2021.
