= Lennox Island 1 =

Coordinates: 46°36′53″N 63°51′14″W

Lennox Island 1 in Prince Edward Island

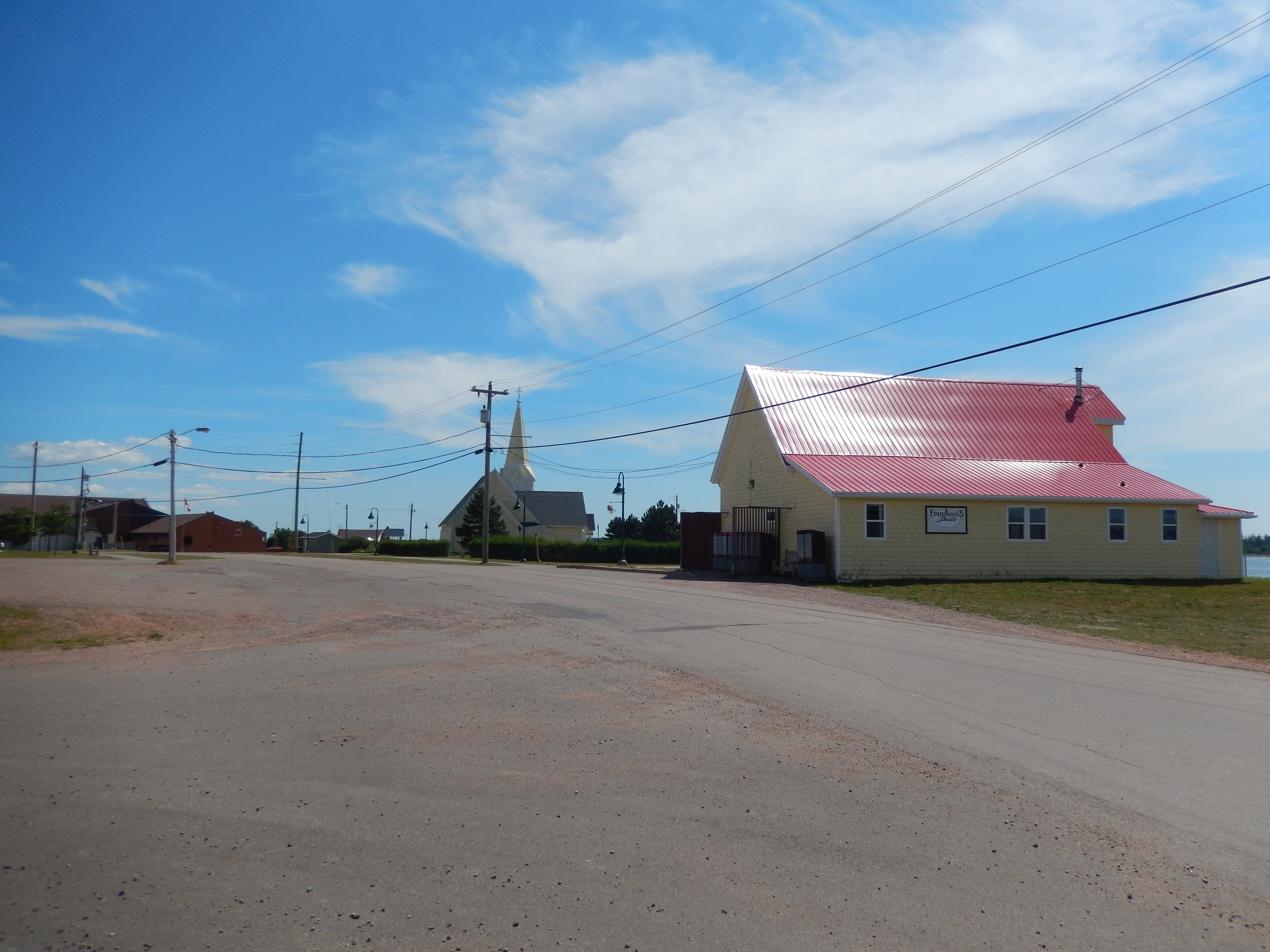
Lennox Island in 2017

Lennox Island 1 is a Mi'kmaq reserve comprising the entirety of the island named Lennox Island.

It is located in Prince County, Prince Edward Island. In the 2021 Census, the reserve has 308 residents.

It is administratively part of the Lennox Island First Nation.

== History ==
The Mi'kmaq have inhabited the lands comprising present-day Prince Edward Island for over 10,000 years.

The reserve named Lennox Island 1 is notable for being the first reserve in Canada owned by its people, having been purchased in 1878 by the Aboriginal Protection Society.

In 1973 the Lennox Island Bridge opened, connecting the island to Prince Edward Island.
