= Truro 27B =

First Nation reserve in Nova Scotia, Canada

Coordinates: 45°19′20.43″N 63°17′25.87″W

Truro 27B in Nova Scotia

Truro 27B is a Mi'kmaq reserve located in Colchester County, Nova Scotia.

It is administratively part of the Millbrook First Nation.
