= Miꞌkmaq =

Indigenous ethnic group of eastern North America

Lꞌnuk
- Mi'kmaq flag

- Miꞌkmaꞌki, the Miꞌkmaw country, and its districts, with the rest of the Wabanaki Confederacy labelled in light green.

Total population
- 66,748 registered members (2023); 168,480 claimed Miꞌkmaq ancestry (2016)

Regions with significant populations
- (Miꞌkmaꞌki, Wapna'ki); Canada, United States
- Newfoundland and Labrador: 28,282
- Nova Scotia: 18,814
- New Brunswick: 9,025
- Quebec: 7,655
- Maine: 1,489
- Prince Edward Island: 1,483

Languages
- English, Miꞌkmawi'simk, French; American Sign Language, Quebec Sign Language, Maritime Sign Language

Religion
- Native American religion, Christianity, others

Related ethnic groups
- Other Algonquian peoples Especially Abenaki, Maliseet, Passamaquoddy, Penobscot

ni'kmaq / lꞌnuk "my friends" / "people"
- Person: Miꞌkmaw (Lꞌnu)
- People: Miꞌkmaq (Lnuꞌk)
- Language: Miꞌkmawiꞌsimk
- Country: Miꞌkmaꞌki; Wapnaꞌki

The Miꞌkmaq (English: /ˈmɪɡmɑː/ MIG-mah, Mi'kmaq: [miːɡmaɣ]; singular: Miꞌkmaw, also Lꞌnuk and formerly Micmac) are an Indigenous group of people of the Northeastern Woodlands, native to the areas of Canada's Atlantic Provinces, primarily Nova Scotia, New Brunswick, Prince Edward Island, and Newfoundland, and the Gaspé Peninsula of Quebec as well as Native Americans in the northeastern region of Maine. The traditional national territory of the Miꞌkmaq is named Miꞌkmaꞌki (or Mi'gma'gi); it is one of the five confederated Wabanaki (or Dawnland) countries.

As of 2023, there are 66,748 Miꞌkmaq people in the region; this includes 25,182 members in the more recently formed Qalipu First Nation in Newfoundland. According to the Canadian 2021 census, 9,245 people claim to speak Miꞌkmawi'simk, an Eastern Algonquian language. Once written in Miꞌkmaw hieroglyphic writing, it is now written using most letters of the Latin alphabet.

The Miꞌkmaq, Wolastoqiyik (Maliseet), and Pasamaquoddy nations signed a series of treaties known as the Peace and Friendship Treaties with the British Crown throughout the 18th century; the first was signed in 1725, and the last in 1779. The Miꞌkmaq maintain that they did not cede or give up their land title to Miꞌkmaꞌki or other rights through these Peace and Friendship Treaties. The landmark 1999 Supreme Court of Canada decision in R v Marshall upheld the 1752 Peace and Friendship Treaty "which promised Indigenous Peoples the right to hunt and fish their lands and establish trade."

The Miꞌkmaq Grand Council is the official authority that engages in consultation with the Canadian federal government and the provincial government of Nova Scotia, as established by the historic August 30, 2010, agreement with the Miꞌkmaq Nation, resulting from the Miꞌkmaq–Nova Scotia–Canada Tripartite Forum. This collaborative agreement, which includes all the First Nations within the province of Nova Scotia, was the first in Canadian history.

Historically, the Santeꞌ Mawioꞌmi, or Grand Council—which was made up of district councils and chiefs, or saqamaq, of Miꞌkmaꞌki—was the traditional senior level of government for the Miꞌkmaq people. The 1876 Indian Act disrupted that authority, by requiring First Nations to establish representative elected governments along the Canadian model, and attempting to limit the Council's role to spiritual guidance.

== Etymology ==
Miꞌkmaq (singular: Miꞌkmaw) comes from the word niꞌkmaq meaning "my friends". There exist various spelling conventions resulting in forms like Miꞌgmaq (sing.: Miꞌgmaw) and Míkmaq (sing.: Mígmaw). The singular form (Miꞌkmaw) is also used as the adjectival form, as seen in "Miꞌkmaw Nation". Alternatively, Miꞌkmaq use the terms Lꞌnu (plural: Lꞌnuk, meaning "the people") to describe themselves.

== Grand Council Santeꞌ Mawioꞌmi ==
On August 30, 2010, the Miꞌkmaq Nation and the Nova Scotia provincial government reached a historic agreement, affirming that the Miꞌkmaq Grand Council was the official consultative authority that engages with the Canadian federal government and the provincial government of Nova Scotia. The Miꞌkmaq–Nova Scotia–Canada Tripartite Forum preceded the agreement. The August 2010 agreement is the first such collaborative agreement in Canadian history; it includes representation for all the First Nations within the entire province of Nova Scotia.

Historically the Santeꞌ Mawioꞌmi, or Grand Council, which was made up of chiefs of the district councils of Miꞌkmaꞌki, was the traditional senior level of government for the Miꞌkmaq people. The 1876 Indian Act disrupted that authority, by requiring First Nations to establish representative elected governments and attempting to limit the Council's role to that of spiritual guidance.

In addition to the district councils, the Miꞌkmaq have been traditionally governed by a Grand Council or Santeꞌ Mawioꞌmi. The Grand Council was composed of Keptinaq ("captains" in English), who were the district chiefs. There were also elders, the putús (wampum belt readers and historians, who also dealt with the treaties with the non-Natives and other Native tribes), the women's council, and the grand chief. The grand chief was a title given to one of the district chiefs, who was usually from the Miꞌkmaq district of Unamáki or Cape Breton Island. This title was hereditary within a clan and usually passed on to the grand chief's eldest son.

On June 24, 1610, Grand Chief Membertou converted to Catholicism and was baptised. He concluded an alliance with the French Jesuits. The Miꞌkmaq, as trading allies of the French, were amenable to limited French settlement in their midst.

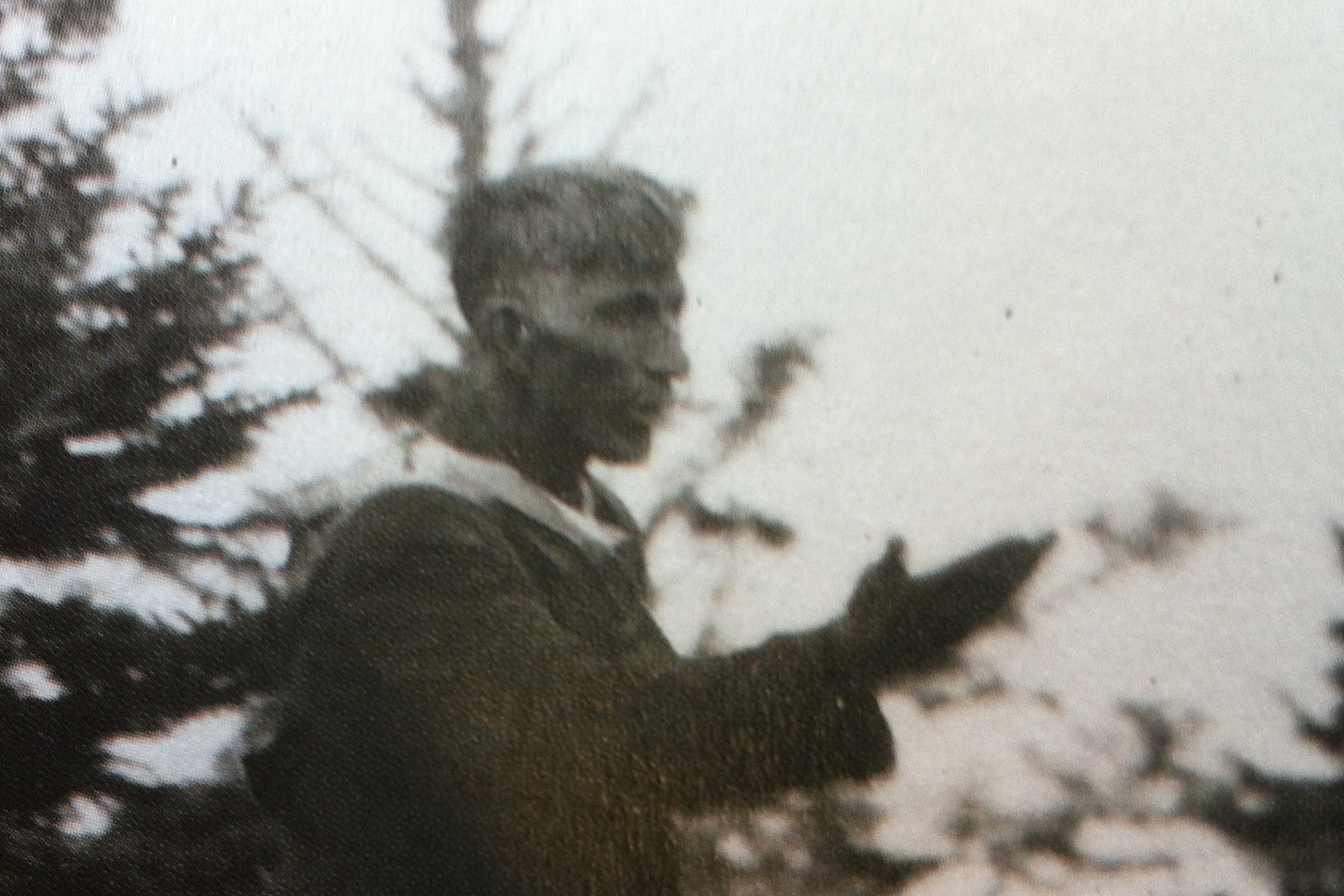
Chief Gabriel Sylliboy – first to fight for Treaty Rights in the Supreme Court of Nova Scotia, 1929

Gabriel Sylliboy (1874–1964), a respected Miꞌkmaq religious leader and traditional Grand Chief of the Council, was elected as the Council's Grand Chief in 1918. Repeatedly re-elected, he held this position for the rest of his life.

In 1927, Grand Chief Sylliboy was charged by Nova Scotia with hunting muskrat pelts out of season. He was the first to use the rights defined in the Treaty of 1752 in his court defence. He lost his case. In 1985, the Supreme Court of Canada finally recognized the 1752 treaty rights for Indigenous hunting and fishing in their ruling on R v Simon. On the 50th anniversary of Sylliboy's death, the Grand Council asked the Nova Scotia government for a pardon for the late Grand Chief. Premier Stephen McNeil granted the posthumous pardon in 2017. Lieutenant-Governor of Nova Scotia, John James Grant, McNeil, and the Justice Minister Diana Whalen, pardoned Sylliboy and issued a formal apology: it was the "second posthumous pardon in Nova Scotia's history". His grandson, Andrew Denny, now the Grand Keptin of the Council, said that his grandfather had "commanded respect. Young people who were about to get married would go and ask for his blessing. At the Chapel Island Mission boats would stop if he was crossing."

Traditionally, the Grand Council met on a small island, Mniku, on the Bras d'Or Lake in Cape Breton. In the early 21st century, this site is now within the reserve known as Chapel Island or Potlotek. The Grand Council continues to meet at Mniku to discuss current issues within the Miꞌkmaq Nation.

Taqamkuk (Newfoundland) was historically defined as part of Unama'kik territory. (Later the large island was organized as a separate district in the province of Newfoundland and Labrador.)

== Miꞌkmaq language ==
According to the 2021 census, 9,245 people identified as speakers of the Miꞌkmaq language. 4,910 of which said it was their mother tongue, and 2,595 reported it to be their most often spoken language at home.

=== Hieroglyphic writing ===
The Miꞌkmaq language was written using Miꞌkmaq hieroglyphic writing using a hieroglyphic system created in 1677 by French Catholic missionary Chrestien Le Clerq. Le Clerq noted that the Miꞌkmaq children were memorizing prayers utilizing the counting of marks, but did not claim to have incorporated any of this system into the hieroglyphs he created. It is likely that this pre-Le Clerq system was part of a mnemonic tradition by the Miꞌkmaq similar to that observed in 1651 amongst the Eastern Abenaki of Maine. Today, it is written mainly using letters of the Latin alphabet.

At the Kejimkujik National Park and National Historic Site, petroglyphs of "life-ways of the Miꞌkmaq", include written hieroglyphics, human figures, Miꞌkmaq houses and lodges, decorations including crosses, sailing vessels, and animals, etched into slate rocks. These are attributed to the Miꞌkmaq, who have continuously inhabited the area since prehistoric times. The petroglyphs date from the late prehistoric period through the nineteenth century.

Jerry Lonecloud (1854 – 1930, Miꞌkmaq) is considered the "ethnographer of the Miꞌkmaq nation". In 1912, he transcribed some of the Kejimkujik petroglyphs, and donated his works to the Nova Scotia Museum. He is credited with the first Miꞌkmaq memoir, which was recorded from his oral history in the 1920s.

In the late 1670s, French missionary Chrestien Le Clercq, who was working in the Gaspé Peninsula, was inspired by marks made by a young Miꞌkmaq using charcoal on birchbark. Leclercq created what is now known as Miꞌkmaq hieroglyphic writing to teach Catholic prayers and hymns to the people in their own unique form of language. After Le Clerq's returned to France in 1687, the script had to be taught to other groups of Miꞌkmaq by other missionaries, indicating it was not a script that the Indigenous peoples already knew.

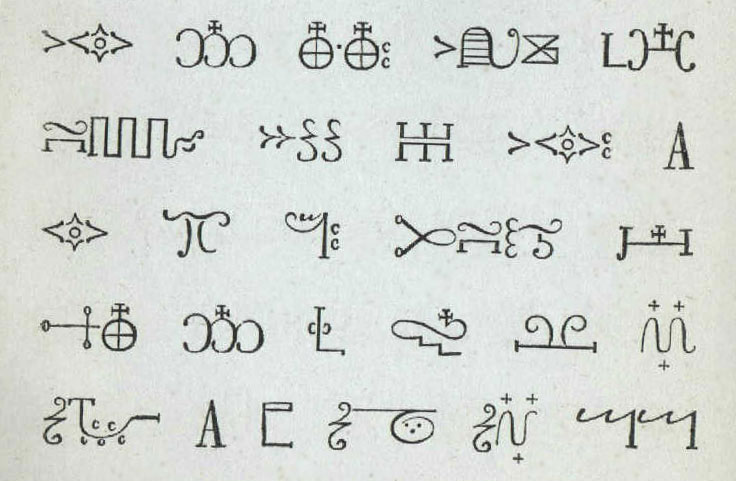
The Holy Mary Rosary prayer in Miꞌkmaq hieroglyphics by the Luxembourg missionary Christian Kauder, 1866

Christian Kauder was a Luxembourg missionary in Miꞌkmaꞌki from 1856 to 1871. He included samples of Miꞌkmaq hieroglyphic writing, such as the Holy Mary Rosary prayer and the Lord's Prayer, in his German Christian catechism published in Vienna in 1866.

David L. Schmidt and Murdena Marshall published some of the prayers, narratives, and liturgies represented in hieroglyphs—pictographic symbols in a 1995 book. As noted, the pre-contact Miꞌkmaq utilized some form of birchbark mnemonic marks and petroglyphs, but Le Clerq indicated that the hieroglyphs were "formed" by him. French Jesuit missionaries adopted their use to teach Catholic prayers and religion to the Miꞌkmaq. Schmidt and Marshall showed that these hieroglyphics served as a fully functional writing system. They assert it is the oldest writing system for an Indigenous language in North America north of Mexico.

=== Etymology of the word Miꞌkmaq ===
By the 1980s, the spelling of the ethnonym Miꞌkmaq, which is preferred by the Miꞌkmaw people, was widely adopted by scholarly publications and the media. It replaced the previous spelling Micmac. (Note: Anne-Christine Hornbord is a Lund University professor of history of religions; she conducted fieldwork on reservations of Cape Breton Island, Nova Scotia, and Canada in 1992–1993, 1996 and 2000.) Although this older spelling is still in use, the Miꞌkmaq consider the spelling "Micmac" to be "tainted" by colonialism. The "q" ending is used in the plural form of the noun, and Miꞌkmaw is used as singular of Miꞌkmaq. It is also used as an adjective, for example, "the Miꞌkmaw nation".

The Miꞌkmaq prefer to use one of the three current Miꞌkmaq orthographies when writing the language. (Note: "It is now the preferred choice of our People." See Paul:2000.) Spellings used by Miꞌkmaq people include:

- Miꞌkmaq (singular Miꞌkmaw) in Prince Edward Island (Epekw'itk), Nova Scotia (Miꞌkmaꞌki-Unama'ki), and Newfoundland (K'taqamkuk);
- Miigmaq (Miigmao) in New Brunswick (Sipekni'katik);
- Mi'gmaq by the Listuguj Council in Quebec (Kespek); and
- Mìgmaq (Mìgmaw) in some Native literature.

Lnu (the adjectival and singular noun, previously spelled "Lꞌnu"; the plural is Lnúk, Lnuꞌk, Lnuꞌg, or Lnùg) is the term the Miꞌkmaq use for themselves, their autonym, meaning "human being" or "the people". Members of the Miꞌkmaq historically referred to themselves as Lnu, but used the term níkmaq (my kin) as a greeting.

The French initially referred to the Miꞌkmaq as Souriquois and later as Gaspesiens. Adopting a term from the English, they referred to them as Mickmakis. The British originally referred to the people as Tarrantines, which appears to have a French basis.

Various explanations exist for the rise of the term Miꞌkmaq. The Miꞌkmaw Resource Guide says that "Miꞌkmaq" means "the family". (Note: "The definite article "the" suggests that "Miꞌkmaq" is the undeclined form indicated by the initial letter "m". When declined in the singular, it reduces to the following forms: nikmaq – my family; kikmaq – your family; wikma – his/her family. The variant form Miꞌkmaw plays two grammatical roles: 1) It is the singular of Miꞌkmaq and 2) it is an adjective in circumstances where it precedes a noun (e.g., mi'kmaw people, mi'kmaw treaties, miꞌkmaw person, etc.)" see Miꞌkmaw Resource Guide, Eastern Woodlands Publishing (1997).) The Anishinaabe refer to the Miꞌkmaq as Miijimaa(g), meaning "The Brother(s)/Ally(ies)", with the use of the nX prefix m-, opposed to the use of n1 prefix n- (i.e. Niijimaa(g), "my brother(s)/comrade(s)") or the n3 prefix w- (i.e., Wiijimaa(g), "brother(s)/compatriot(s)/comrade(s)").

Charles Aubert de La Chesnaye was documented as the first European to record the term "Miꞌkmaq" for the people, using it in his 1676 memoir. Marion Robertson stated this in the book Red Earth: Tales of the Miꞌkmaq (1960s), published by the Nova Scotia Museum, Robertson cites Professor Ganong, who suggested that "Miꞌkmaq" was derived from the Miꞌkmaq word megamingo (earth). Marc Lescarbot had also suggested this.

The Miꞌkmaq may have identified as "the Red Earth People, or the People of the Red Earth". Megumaagee, the name the Miꞌkmaq used to describe their land, and Megumawaach, what they called themselves, were linked to the words megwaak, which refers to the colour red, and magumegek, "on the earth". Rand translated megakumegek as "red on the earth", "red ground", or "red earth". Other suggestions from Robertson include its origin in nigumaach, which means "my brother" or "my friend", or a term of endearment. Stansbury Hagar suggested in Miꞌkmaq Magic and Medicine that the word megumawaach is from megumoowesoo, in reference to magic.

== Geography ==
Miꞌkmaꞌki: Divided into seven districts. Not shown is Taqamgug/Tagamuk, the eighth district that includes the entire island of Newfoundland. Taqamgug was historically part of Onamag before the 1800s.

Miꞌkmaq Country, known as Miꞌkmaꞌki, is traditionally divided into seven districts. Prior to the imposition of the Indian Act, each district had its own independent government and boundaries. The independent governments had a district chief and a council. The council members were band chiefs, elders, and other worthy community leaders. The district council was charged with performing all the duties of any independent and free government by enacting laws, justice, apportioning fishing and hunting grounds, making war and suing for peace.

=== Districts ===
The eight Miꞌkmaq districts (including Ktaqmkuk which is often not counted) are Epekwitk aq Piktuk (Epegwitg aq Pigtug), Eskikewa'kik (Esge'gewa'gi), Kespek (Gespe'gewa'gi), Kespukwitk (Gespugwitg), Siknikt (Signigtewa'gi), Sipekni'katik (Sugapune'gati), Ktaqmkuk (Gtaqamg), and Unama'kik (Unama'gi). The orthography between parentheses is the Listuguj orthography used in the Gespe'gewa'gi area.

== Current federal and provincial relations with Miꞌkmaq ==
=== Tripartite Forum ===
In 1997, the Miꞌkmaq–Nova Scotia–Canada Tripartite Forum was established. On August 31, 2010, the governments of Canada and Nova Scotia signed a historic agreement with the Miꞌkmaq Nation, establishing a process whereby the federal government must consult with the Miꞌkmaq Grand Council before engaging in any activities or projects that affect the Miꞌkmaq in Nova Scotia. This covers most, if not all, actions these governments might take within that jurisdiction. This is the first such collaborative agreement in Canadian history including all the First Nations within an entire province.

=== Marshall decision ===
On September 17, 1999, the Supreme Court of Canada upheld the treaty rights of Miꞌkmaq Donald Marshall Jr. its landmark R v Marshall ruling, which "affirmed a treaty right to hunt, fish and gather in pursuit of a 'moderate livelihood'." The Supreme Court also cited Section 35 of the 1982 Constitution Act in their 1999 ruling that resulted in Miꞌkmaq, Maliseet, and Peskotomuhkati people the "right to hunt, fish and gather in pursuit of a 'moderate livelihood' from the resources of the land and waters." The legal precedent had previously been established in the Treaty of 1752, one in a series of treaties known as the Peace and Friendship Treaties, but was not being respected prior to R v Marshall. This resulted in the 1993 charges laid against Marshall Jr. for "fishing eels out of season, fishing without a licence, and fishing with an illegal net". In the 2018 publication, Truth and conviction: Donald Marshall Jr. and the Miꞌkmaq quest for justice, Marshall was quoted as saying, "I don't need a licence. I have the 1752 Treaty." The 1989 Royal Commission on the Donald Marshall Jr. Prosecution resulted in a compensation to Marshall of a lifetime pension of $1.5 million. Marshall used the financial compensation to finance the lengthy and costly Supreme Court case. When Marshall won, 34 Miꞌkmaq and Maliseet First Nations bands were affected in the provinces of New Brunswick, Prince Edward Island, Nova Scotia, and the Gaspé region of Quebec. The West Nova Fishermen's Coalition submitted an appeal asking for the Marshall decision to be set aside. In November 17, 1999, released a new ruling (Marshall 2) to clarify that the DFO had the power to regulate the fishery for conservation purposes if it "consulted with the First Nation and could justify the regulations". (Note: CBC News reported that, "In 'Marshall 2,' the supreme court ruled that governments must justify restrictions or regulations on treaty rights based on previous, legally-tested criteria including "a valid legislative objective" such as conservation, "whether there has been as little infringement as possible" on rights, and "whether the aboriginal group in question has been consulted" on the government's proposed restrictions.")

Soon after the September 17 decision, Miramichi Bay—"one of Canada's most lucrative lobster fisheries"— became the site of a violent conflict between Miꞌkmaq fishers and non-Miꞌkmaq commercial fishers. Immediately after the ruling, Miꞌkmaq fishers began to lay lobster traps out of season. Incidents such as the Burnt Church Crisis were widely covered by the media from 1999 and 2002. On October 3, 1999, non-Indigenous commercial fishers in 150 boats destroyed hundreds of Miꞌkmaq lobster traps, then returned to shore and vandalized fishing equipment, as well as three fish plants. This was captured and documented in the 2002 National Film Board feature-length documentary Is the Crown at war with us? by Alanis Obomsawin. The documentary also described how Ocean and Fisheries department officials seemed to "wage a war" on the Miꞌkmaq fishermen of Burnt Church, New Brunswick with "helicopters, patrol boats, guns, with observation by airplanes and dozens of RCMP officers". The documentary asks why the fishers were being harassed for "exercising rights that had been affirmed by the highest court in the land." Following lengthy negotiations with the Miꞌkmaq, the DFO developed the $160 million Marshall Response Initiative, which operated until 2007, through which the DFO offered to purchase over 1,000 commercial fishing licences, including boats and gear, to support the expansion of the Miꞌkmaq lobster fishery. By mid-2000, about 1,400 commercial fishermen stated their intention to retire over 5,000 licences. On August 20, 2001, the DFO issued a temporary license to Burnt Church Miꞌkmaq fishers while negotiations for a more permanent agreement were underway. The DFO license had restrictions that some Burnt Church fishers refused: the fishers could not sell their lobsters, they could only use them for food, social, and ceremonial (FSC) purposes. The "Aboriginal right to fish for food, social and ceremonial purposes (FSC)" was confirmed in the landmark 1990 R v Sparrow Supreme Court case which cited section 35 of the Constitution Act, 1982. (Note: In Ahousaht Indian Band and Nation v. Canada, a Supreme Court case that spanned over a decade, the Ahousaht Indian Band and Nation in British Columbia confirmed their right to "fish in their court-defined territories and sell that fish into the commercial marketplace.") In May 2003, the House of Commons' Standing Committee On Fisheries And Oceans chaired by MP Tom Wappel, submitted its report on fisheries issues, which "recommended that all charges stemming from the [confrontation over the lobster fisheries]" be dropped and that the fishers should be compensated by federal government for "their lost traps and boats." The report said that Miꞌkmaq fishers have the "same season as non-native fishermen" and could not therefore, fish in the fall. It recommended that "native bands be issued licences, which they would distribute to native fishermen."

On the tenth anniversary of the benchmark decision, CBC News reported that "Maritime waters" were "calm a decade after Marshall decision."

However, by 2020, the Fish Buyers' Licensing and Enforcement Regulations, under the 1996 N.S. Fisheries and Coastal Resources Act, remains in effect—as it does in other Atlantic provinces. These regulations do not mention the Miꞌkmaq or the Marshall decision. These regulations prevent Miꞌkmaq lobster fishers from selling their lobster to non-Miꞌkmaq. Miꞌkmaq fishers say that this does not align with the Marshall decision. In 2019, the government of the Listuguj First Nation in the Bay of Chaleur developed their own self-regulated lobster fisheries management plan and opened their own lobster fishery in the fall of 2020. Under the existing Fish Buyers' Licensing Regulations the self-regulated Listuguj fisheries can harvest, but can only use the lobster for "food, social and ceremonial purposes".

According to Chief Terry Paul of Membertou First Nation, early in 2020, a negotiator for the DFO had offered Nova Scotia First Nations nearly $87 million for boats, gear, and training, with the condition that the First Nations would not practice their treaty right to earn a moderate livelihood fishing (ie out of the DFO season) for a period of 10 years. The proposal did not define "moderate livelihood", and was rejected.

On November 9, 2020, a group of Miꞌkmaq First Nations and Premium Brands Holdings Corporation announced their $1 billion purchase of Clearwater Seafoods, which was finalised on January 25, 2021. The group of First Nations includes Sipekne'katik, We'koqma'q, Potlotek, Pictou Landing, and Paqtnkek First Nations, and is led by Membertou and Miapukek First Nations. The purchase represents the "largest investment in the seafood industry by a Canadian Indigenous group". The harvest of non-Indigenous fishermen in the region will now be purchased by Clearwater Seafoods' Miꞌkmaq part owners.

=== Dispute over rights-based inshore lobster fishery (2020–present) ===
Dispute over rights-based inshore lobster fishery
- Date: September 2020 – ongoing
- Location: Canada
- Caused by: Miꞌkmaq exercising their treaty rights to fish
- Status: ongoing

Parties
Miꞌkmaq	Commercial fishers

Casualties
- Charged: 23

Since September 2020, there has been an ongoing lobster fishing dispute between Sipekneꞌkatik First Nation members of the Miꞌkmaq and non-Indigenous lobster fishers mainly in Digby County and Yarmouth County, Nova Scotia.

==== Background ====
After Miꞌkmaq chiefs declared a state of emergency in October 2020, the federal government appointed Allister Surette as Federal Special Representative to investigate.

In the March 2021 report's backgrounder, Surette cited Macdonald-Laurier Institute's Ken Coates who said that Mik'maq communities had benefitted from improvements resulting from the Marshall decision, as the Department of Fisheries and Oceans Canada (DFO) granted access to Miꞌkmaq fishers to the "commercial fishery through communal licences operated by the bands". Macdonald-Laurier Institute's Ken Coates said that the commercial fishing industry had not suffered because of this. Others disagreed, saying that Canada had never fully implemented the Marshall decision, and that, over the decades, various levels of government and authorities mishandled and neglected local concerns related to the implementation of the Marshall decision.

In September 2020, the Sipekne'katik First Nation developed a fishing plan based on their right to fish in pursuit of a moderate livelihood. They issued seven lobster licenses to band members; each license has 50 tags, representing a combined total of 350 tags. One commercial lobster license represents 350 tags. The lobster fishery they initiated was located "outside of the regulated commercial season in Lobster Fishing Area 34 in St. Marys Bay, Nova Scotia—the Kespukwitk (also spelled Gespogoitnag) district of Miꞌkmaꞌki.

The inshore fishery is the last small-scale fishery in Nova Scotia. St. Marys Bay is part of Lobster Fishing Area (LFA) 34, making it the "largest lobster fishing area in Canada with more than 900 licensed commercial fishermen harvesting from the southern tip of Nova Scotia up to Digby in the Bay of Fundy." It is also "one of the most lucrative fishing areas in Canada". DFO reported that as of December 2019, there were 979 commercial lobster licenses in LFA 34.

The Sipekne'katik fishing plan "became a flash point" resulting in violent highly-charged conflict pitting non-Miꞌkmaq lobster fishers in the adjacent coastal communities and Miꞌkmaq fishers those carrying out the moderate livelihood fishery.

==== Violence ====
On September 11, Sipekne'katik First Nation Chief Michael Sack sent a letter to Premier Stephen McNeil, DFO Minister Bernadette Jordan and Nova Scotia RCMP Commanding Officer Lee Bergerman, calling for them "to uphold the rule of law amid ongoing violence, threats, human rights discrimination and ongoing failure to uphold the 1999 Supreme Court of Canada decision in R v Marshall, recognizing the Miꞌkmaq right to fish and trade." By that point, vehicles and property belonging to members of the Sipekne'katik First Nation had already been damaged and stolen, including boats being burned. There were already planned protests by non-Indigenous fishers to block the Miꞌkmaq fishers' access to several wharves. One such protest took place on September 15 at Saulnierville and Weymouth wharves.

On September 17, Sipekne'katik launched a moderate livelihood fishery with a ceremony at the Saulnierville wharf, the first lobster fishery regulated by Miꞌkmaq in Nova Scotia. On September 18, the Assembly of Nova Scotia Miꞌkmaw Chiefs declared a province-wide state of emergency in response to threats by commercial and non-Indigenous fishers, including some that had cut the Miꞌkmaq lobster traps. On September 25, the Sipekne'katik fishery released its proposed regulations allowing the legal sale of seafood harvested under the fishery to Indigenous and non-Indigenous consumers and wholesalers. However, at the time of the announcement, Nova Scotia's Fisheries and Coastal Resources Act prohibited anyone in Nova Scotia from purchasing fish from "a person who does not hold a valid commercial fishing license issued by Fisheries and Oceans Canada," which would include the fishery.

On October 1, Potlotek First Nation and Eskasoni First Nation launched their own moderate livelihood fishery in a celebration at Battery Provincial Park that coincided with Miꞌkmaq Treaty Day. The management plan behind this fishery had been in development for three months, prompted by the seizure of lobster traps by DFO officials. Community licenses issued through this fishery will entitle fishers to 70 tags, and boats will be allowed to carry up to 200 lobster traps each. At the time of the launch of the Potlotek fishery, Membertou was also planning on launching their own fishery, following a similar plan. After the launch of this fishery, DFO officers continued to seize Miꞌkmaq traps.

Harassment around the Sipekne'katik fishery continued through October. On October 5, Sipekne'katik fisher Robert Syliboy, a holder of one of the moderate livelihood fishery's licenses, found his boat at the Comeauville wharf destroyed in a suspicious fire. On the evening of October 13, several hundred non-Indigenous fishers and their supporters raided two storage facilities in New Edinburgh and Middle West Pubnico that were being used by Miꞌkmaq fishers to store lobsters. During the raids, a van was set aflame, another vehicle was defaced and damaged, lobsters being stored in the facilities were destroyed, and the New Edinburgh facility was damaged, while a Miꞌkmaw fisher was forced to barricade himself inside the facility in Middle West Pubnico. Indigenous leaders called the raids racist hate crimes and called on the RCMP to intervene, citing their slow response on the evening and lack of arrests even a day after the police claimed they "witnessed criminal activity". Social media posts from the commercial fishers and their supporters claimed that the lobsters taken in the raids were removed as they represented "bad fishing practices" on the part of the Miꞌkmaq, but Sipekne'katik Chief Mike Sack and a worker at the Middle West Pubnico facility claimed the lobsters that were stored there were caught by the commercial fishers, not Miꞌkmaw. Assembly of First Nations national chief Perry Bellegarde, federal Fisheries minister Bernadette Jordan, and Colin Sproul, president of the Bay of Fundy Inshore Fishermen's Association, all condemned the violence. Nova Scotia Premier Stephen McNeil maintained his position that this issue must be solved federally when asked about it at a press conference. Several months later, in January 2021, the manager of the Middle West Pubnico facility, James Muise, made a public post in a Facebook group for commercial fishers, claiming that he gave the people involved in the raids permission to enter the facility and take the lobsters. Muise offered to work with people charged with offenses connected to the raids and try to get those charges dropped.

Chief Mike Sack was sucker punched while trying to give a press conference on October 14. Also during the violence, an elder had sage knocked out of her hand while smudging, and a woman was grabbed by the neck.

On October 15, the Miꞌkmaq Warrior Peacekeepers arrived at the Saulnierville wharf with the intention of providing protection to Miꞌkmaq who were continuing to fish amid the violence.

On Friday, October 16, Prime Minister Justin Trudeau said that his government was "extremely active" in trying to de-escalate the situation. He also stated that he expected the police to be keeping people safe, and acknowledged concerns that the police had not been doing so.

Three days after the initial raids on the storage facilities, on the evening of October 16, the Middle West Pubnico facility was destroyed in a large fire, deemed "suspicious" by the RCMP. One man was taken to hospital with life-threatening injuries after the fire, but the RCMP did not provide details regarding the man's association to the lobster pound, other than that he was not an employee. The destruction led to further calls from Chief Sack for increased police presence, as well as an appeal from the Maritime Fisherman's Union for the federal government to appoint an independent mediator.

On October 16, Miꞌkmaq lobster fishers from the Sipekne'katik First Nation quickly sold all their lobsters after setting up shop in front of the Province House in Halifax with potential customers lined up around the block. The fishers said they were putting pressure on Premier McNeil to act.

On October 17, Nova Scotia Premier Stephen McNeil, released a Twitter statement requesting that the federal government define "what constitutes legal harvesting in a "moderate livelihood" fishery.

On October 21, Sipekne'katik managed to secure an interim injunction against the restriction of band members' access to the Saulnierville and Weymouth wharves, as well as the New Edinburgh lobster pound. The motion for the injunction was filed ex parte due to the urgency of the situation, as the band was struggling to sell any of their catch in the midst of the violence and protests. The injunction will remain in place until December 15, 2020.

In January 2021, 23 people were charged in connection to the violence at the lobster storage facilities on October 13, 2020: 15 for break-and-enter and 8 for break-and-enter and mischief. Their court date was set for March 29, 2021.

Intimidation over the fishery dispute has continued into 2021. In mid-January, lobster harvester and Sipekne'katik citizen Jolene Marr, whose brother was surrounded in the West Pubnico lobster pound on October 13, was sent a seven second-long close-up video of a man's face that included what "sounds like a racial slur and six gunshots in the background."

==== Legal action ====
On March 26, 2021, 43 Miꞌkmaq lobster fishers from the Sipekne'katik First Nation filed a statement of claim against the attorney general of Canada, the RCMP, the DFO, and 29 non-Indigenous fishers including the Bay of Fundy Inshore Fishermen's Association (BFIFA). The claim alleges that the non-Indigenous fishers named as defendants took the law into their own hands and engaged in violence against the moderate livelihood fishery, that they were encouraged to do so by BFIFA, and that the DFO and RCMP contributed to the harm by not intervening in the foreseeable violence.

==== Talks with DFO ====
On October 23, 2020, the Miꞌkmaq Rights Initiative (known as the KMKNO for "Kwilmu'kw Maw-klusuaqn Negotiation Office") announced that talks with the DFO over defining "moderate livelihood" had broken down. The following Wednesday (October 28), Terry Paul, chief of Membertou First Nation, stepped down from his position with KMKNO and the Assembly of Nova Scotia Miꞌkmaq Chiefs, saying "[his] confidence in the operations of the organization [sic] have weakened over time," citing issues of transparency, and preferring to pursue treaty rights negotiations outside of the Assembly. Membertou's withdrawal follows Sipekne'katik's own withdrawal earlier in the month on October 6, leaving the Assembly as a representative of 10 of the 13 Miꞌkmaq First Nation bands (Millbrook having also withdrawn earlier). According to Paul, when he talked with the other ANSMC Chiefs about his decision, there seemed to be a willingness to deal with the issues he had identified in the negotiation process, so that he could rejoin shortly.

Fisheries Minister Bernadette Jordan sent a letter to Chief Mike Sack on March 3, 2021, outlining the terms under which a moderate livelihood fishery could be negotiated, and what the federal government would be "prepared" to allow; the letter proposed balancing "additional First Nations access through already available licences" and stated that "these fisheries will operate within established seasons." These terms were rejected by Chief Sack, who stated that "we have a management plan that is better for conservation than theirs is, so we're going to follow our own plan."

=== Truth and Reconciliation Commission ===
In 2005, Nova Scotian Miꞌkmaw Nora Bernard led the largest class-action lawsuit in Canadian history, representing an estimated 79,000 survivors of the Canadian Indian residential school system. The Government of Canada settled the lawsuit for upwards of CA$5 billion.

In autumn 2011, there was an Indian Residential Schools Truth and Reconciliation Commission that travelled to various communities in Atlantic Canada, who were all served by the Shubenacadie Indian Residential School, the sole residential school for the region. In his 2004 book entitled Legacies of the Shubenacadie Residential School, journalist Chris Benjamin wrote about the "raw wounds" of Miꞌkmaw children who attended the Shubenacadie institution in the period spanning over three decades, from 1930 to 1967.

=== Miꞌkmaq Kina' matnewey ===
The first Miꞌkmaq-operated school in Nova Scotia—the Miꞌkmaq Kina' matnewey—was established in 1982 as the result of a collaboration between the Miꞌkmaq community and the Nova Scotia government. The school is the most successful First Nation Education Program in Canada, according to Benjamin.

By 1997, all Miꞌkmaq on reserves were given the responsibility for their own education. By 2014, there were 11 band-run schools in Nova Scotia, and the province has the highest rate of retention of aboriginal students in schools in Canada. More than half the teachers are Miꞌkmaq. From 2011 to 2012 there was a 25% increase in Miꞌkmaq students going to university. Atlantic Canada has the highest rate of aboriginal students attending university in the country.

== History ==
=== Pre-contact period ===
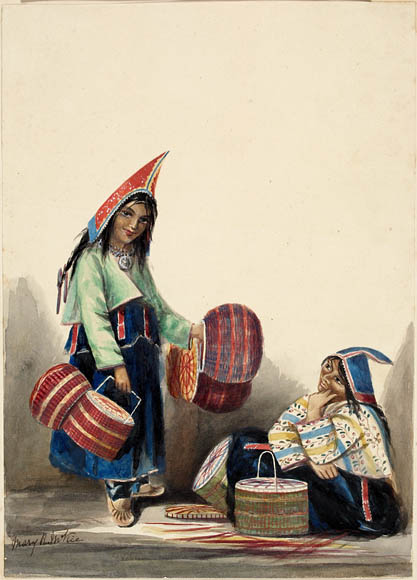
Miꞌkmaq Women Selling Baskets, Halifax, Nova Scotia, by Mary R. McKie c. 1845

In southwestern Nova Scotia, there is archaeological evidence that traces traditional land use and resources to at least 4,000 years. In Kejimkujik National Park and National Historic Site, there are canoe routes that have been used for thousands of years by Indigenous people travelling from the Bay of Fundy to the Atlantic ocean. Research published in 1871 showed that some Miꞌkmaq believed they had emigrated from the west, and then lived alongside the Kwēdĕchk. According to Miꞌkmaq traditions recorded by S. T. Rand, the Kwēdĕchk were the original inhabitants of the land. The two tribes engaged in a war that lasted "many years", and involved the "slaughter of men, women, and children, and torture of captives", and the eventual displacement of the Kwēdĕchk by the victorious Miꞌkmaq.

In his Memorial University master's thesis, Miꞌkmaq elder Roger Lewis investigated how pre-contact Miꞌkmaq populations had a reciprocal relationship with the environment that was reflected in subsistence fishing, hunting and gathering, as well as in settlement locations. Lewis, who has held the position of ethnology curator at the Nova Scotia Museum in Halifax, since 2007 focused his MA research specifically on pre-contact fish weirs in southwestern Nova Scotia.

In the chapter "Late Prehistory of the East Coast" in the Smithsonian's 1978 Handbook of North American Indians, archaeologist Dean Snow says that the fairly deep linguistic split between the Miꞌkmaq and the Eastern Algonquians to the southwest suggests the Miꞌkmaq developed an independent prehistoric cultural sequence in their territory. It emphasized maritime orientation, as the area had relatively few major river systems. In the chapter "Early Indian-European Contact" in the 1978 Handbook, ethnologist T. J. Brasser, described how pre-contact small semi-nomadic bands of a few patrilineally related families who lived in a climate unfavorable for agriculture, had subsisted on fishing and hunting. Developed leadership did not extend beyond hunting parties. In the same 1978 Handbook, anthropologist Philip Bock described the annual cycle of seasonal movement of pre-contact Miꞌkmaq. Bock wrote that the Miꞌkmaq had lived in dispersed interior winter camps and larger coastal communities during the summer. The spawning runs of March began their movement to converge on smelt spawning streams. They next harvested spawning herring, gathered waterfowl eggs, and hunted geese. By May, the seashore offered abundant cod and shellfish, and coastal breezes brought relief from the biting black flies, deer flies, midges, and mosquitoes of the interior. Autumn frost killed the biting insects during the September harvest of spawning American eels. Smaller groups would disperse into the interior where they hunted moose and caribou. The most important animal hunted by the Miꞌkmaq was the moose, which was used in every part: the meat for food, the skin for clothing, tendons and sinew for cordage, and bones for carving and tools. Other animals hunted/trapped included deer, bears, rabbits, beavers, and porcupines.

Braser described the first contact between the Miꞌkmaq and early European fishermen. These fishermen salted their catch at sea and sailed directly home with it, but they set up camps ashore as early as 1520 for dry-curing cod. During the second half of the century, dry curing became the preferred preservation method. Brasser said that trading furs for European trade goods had changed Miꞌkmaq social perspectives. Desire for trade goods encouraged the men to devote a larger portion of the year away from the coast, trapping in the interior. Trapping non-migratory animals, such as beaver, increased awareness of territoriality. Trader preferences for good harbors resulted in greater numbers of Miꞌkmaq gathering in fewer summer rendezvous locations. This in turn encouraged their establishing larger bands, led by the ablest trade negotiators.

According to the Nova Scotia Museum, bear teeth and claws were used as decoration in regalia. The women used porcupine quills to create decorative beadwork on clothing, moccasins, and accessories. The weapon used most for hunting was the bow and arrow. The Miꞌkmaq made their bows from maple. They ate fish of all kinds, such as salmon, sturgeons, lobsters, squids, shellfish, and eels, as well as seabirds and their eggs. They hunted marine mammals such as porpoises, whales, walrus, and seals.

Miꞌkmaq territory was the first portion of North America that Europeans exploited at length for resource extraction. Reports by John Cabot, Jacques Cartier, and Portuguese explorers about conditions there encouraged visits by Portuguese, Spanish, Basque, French, and English fishermen and whalers, beginning in the 16th century.

European fishing camps traded with Miꞌkmaq fishermen, and trading rapidly expanded to include furs, according to Thomas B. Costain, (1885–1965), a journalist who wrote historical novels. By 1578, some 350 European ships were operating around the Saint Lawrence estuary. Most were independent fishermen, but increasing numbers were exploring the fur trade.

=== 17th and 18th centuries ===
==== Colonial wars ====
In the wake of King Philip's War between English colonists and Native Americans in southern New England (which included the first military conflict between the Miꞌkmaq and New England), the Miꞌkmaq became members of the Wapnáki (Wabanaki Confederacy), an alliance with four other Algonquian-language nations: the Abenaki, Penobscot, Passamaquoddy, and Maliseet. The Wabanaki Confederacy was allied with the Acadian people.

Over a period of seventy-five years, during six wars in Miꞌkmaꞌki, the Miꞌkmaq and Acadians fought to keep the British from taking over the region (See the four French and Indian Wars as well as Father Rale's War and Father Le Loutre's War). France lost military control of Acadia in 1710 and political claim (apart from Cape Breton) by the 1713 Treaty of Utrecht with England.

But the Miꞌkmaq were not included in the treaty, and never conceded any land to the British. In 1715, the Miꞌkmaq were told that the British now claimed their ancient territory by the Treaty of Utrecht. They formally complained to the French commander at Louisbourg about the French king transferring the sovereignty of their nation when he did not possess it. They were informed that the French had claimed legal possession of their country for a century, on account of laws decreed by kings in Europe, that no land could be legally owned by any non-Christian, and that such land was therefore freely available to any Christian prince who claimed it. Miꞌkmaq historian Daniel Paul observes that, "If this warped law were ever to be accorded recognition by modern legalists they would have to take into consideration that, after Grand Chief Membertou and his family converted to Christianity in 1610, the land of the Miꞌkmaq had become exempt from being seized because the people were Christians. However, it's hard to imagine that a modern government would fall back and try to use such uncivilized garbage as justification for non-recognition of aboriginal title."

Along with Acadians, the Miꞌkmaq used military force to resist the founding of British (Protestant) settlements by making numerous raids on Halifax, Dartmouth, Lawrencetown, and Lunenburg. During the French and Indian War, the North American front of the Seven Years' War between France and Britain in Europe, the Miꞌkmaq assisted the Acadians in resisting the British during the expulsion. The military resistance was reduced significantly with the French defeat at the Siege of Louisbourg in Cape Breton. In 1763, Great Britain formalized its colonial possession of all of Miꞌkmaꞌki in the Treaty of Paris.

==== Covenant Chain of Peace and Friendship Treaties ====
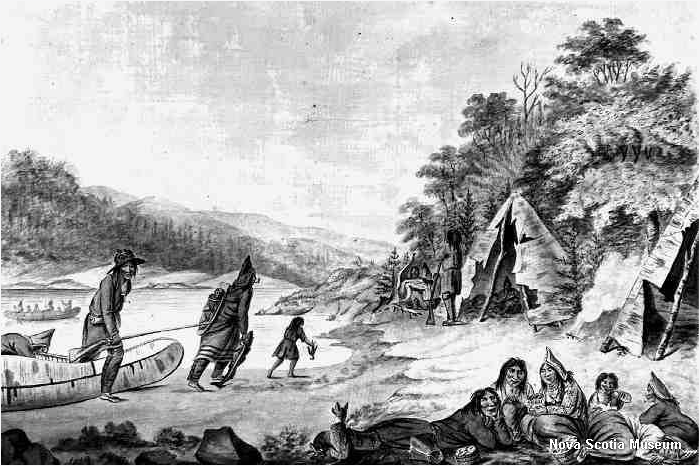
Miꞌkmaw Encampment by Hibbert Newton Binney, c. 1791

Between 1725 and 1779, the Miꞌkmaq, Wolastoqey (Maliseet), and Peskotomuhkati (Passamaquoddy) signed numerous treaties, commonly referred to as the Covenant Chain of Peace and Friendship Treaties, through which they entered into a "peaceful relationship with the British Crown." The Miꞌkmaq assert that through these treaties—which were referenced as legal precedent by the Supreme Court of Canada in R v Marshall—the Miꞌkmaq "did not cede or give up their land title and other rights."

Some historians have asserted that first treaty signed in 1725, after Father Rale's War, did not cede hunting, fishing, and gathering rights. The Halifax Treaties (1760–1761), marked the end of warfare between the Miꞌkmaq and the British.

The 1752 Peace and Friendship Treaty Between His Majesty the King and Jean-Baptiste Cope, on behalf of the Shubenacadie Miꞌkmaq has been cited in the Supreme Court of Canada's 1985 decision in R v Simon. In his 2002 book on the Marshall case, historian William Wicken said that there is no written documentation to support this assertion that Cope made the treaty on behalf of all the Miꞌkmaq. With the signing of various treaties, the 75 years of regular warfare ended in 1761 with the Halifax Treaties.

Although the treaties of 1760–1761 contain statements of Miꞌkmaq submission to the British crown, later statements made by Miꞌkmaq reveal that they intended a friendly and reciprocal relationship, according to the 2009 book, Nova Scotia: a pocket history, by Saint Mary's University history professor, John G. Reid and Brenda Conroy. In the early 1760s, there were approximately 300 Miꞌkmaq fighters in the region and thousands of British soldiers. The goals of the Miꞌkmaq treaty negotiators engaged in the 1760 Halifax treaty negotiations, were to make peace, establish secure and well-regulated trade in commodities such as furs, and begin an ongoing friendship with the British crown. In return, the Miꞌkmaq offered friendship and tolerance of limited British settlement, although without any formal land surrender, according to Reid and Connor. To fulfill the reciprocity intended by the Miꞌkmaq, that any additional British settlement of land would have to be negotiated, and accompanied by giving presents to the Miꞌkmaq. The documents summarizing the peace agreements failed to establish specific territorial limits on the expansion of British settlements, but assured the Miꞌkmaq of access to the natural resources that had long sustained them along the regions' coasts and in the woods. Their conceptions of land use were quite different. In his 2003 book about the British expulsion of the Acadians, University of Cincinnati history professor, Geoffrey Plank, described the relationship between the Miꞌkmaq and Acadians as strong. The Miꞌkmaq believed they could share their traditional lands with both the British and the Acadians—with the Miꞌkmaq hunting as usual, and getting to the coast for seafood.

The arrival of the New England Planters and United Empire Loyalists in greater number put pressure on land use and the treaties. This migration into the region created significant economic, environmental and cultural pressures on the Miꞌkmaq. The Miꞌkmaq tried to enforce the treaties through threat of force. At the beginning of the American Revolution, many Miꞌkmaq and Maliseet tribes supported the Americans against the British. They participated in the Maugerville Rebellion and the Battle of Fort Cumberland in 1776. Miꞌkmaq delegates concluded the first international treaty, the Treaty of Watertown, with the United States soon after it declared its independence in July 1776. These delegates did not officially represent the Miꞌkmaw government, although many individual Miꞌkmaq did privately join the Continental Army as a result. In June 1779, Miꞌkmaq in the Miramichi valley of New Brunswick attacked and plundered some of the British in the area. The following month, British Captain Augustus Harvey, in command of HMS Viper, arrived and battled with the Miꞌkmaq. One Miꞌkmaq was killed and 16 were taken prisoner to Quebec. The prisoners were eventually taken to Halifax. They were released on 28 July 1779 after signing the Oath of Allegiance to the British Crown.

As their military power waned in the beginning of the 19th century, the Miꞌkmaq people made explicit appeals to the British to honor the treaties and reminded them of their duty to give "presents" to the Miꞌkmaq in order to occupy Miꞌkmaꞌki. In response, the British offered charity or, the word most often used by government officials, "relief". The British said the Miꞌkmaq must give up their way of life and begin to settle on farms. They were also told they had to send their children to British schools for education.

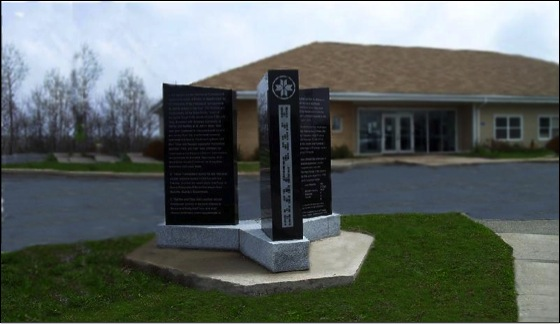
Monument to the Treaty of 1752, Shubenacadie First Nation, Nova Scotia

Gabriel Sylliboy was the first Miꞌkmaq elected as grand chief in 1919 and the first to fight for treaty recognition—specifically, the Treaty of 1752—in the Supreme Court of Nova Scotia.

In 1986, the first Treaty Day was celebrated by Nova Scotians on October 1, 1986 in recognition of the treaties signed between the British Empire and the Miꞌkmaq people.

The treaties were only formally recognized by the Supreme Court of Canada once they were enshrined in Section 35 of the Constitution Act of 1982. The first Treaty Day occurred the year after the Supreme Court upheld the Peace Treaty of 1752 signed by Jean-Baptiste Cope and Governor Peregrine Hopson.

=== 19th century ===
==== Royal Acadian School ====
Walter Bromley was a British officer and reformer who established the Royal Acadian School and supported the Miꞌkmaq over the thirteen years he lived in Halifax (1813–1825). Bromley devoted himself to the service of the Miꞌkmaq people. The Miꞌkmaq were among the poor of Halifax and in the rural communities. According to historian Judith Finguard, his contribution to give public exposure to the plight of the Miꞌkmaq "particularly contributes to his historical significance". Finguard writes:

Bromley's attitudes towards the Indians were singularly enlightened for his day. ... Bromley totally dismissed the idea that native people were naturally inferior and set out to encourage their material improvement through settlement and agriculture, their talents through education, and their pride through his own study of their languages.

==== Miꞌkmaq Missionary Society ====
Silas Tertius Rand in 1849 help found the Miꞌkmaq Missionary Society, a full-time Miꞌkmaq mission. Basing his work in Hantsport, Nova Scotia, where he lived from 1853 until his death in 1889, he travelled widely among Miꞌkmaq communities, spreading the Christian faith, learning the language, and recording examples of the Miꞌkmaq oral tradition. Rand produced scriptural translations in Miꞌkmaq and Maliseet, compiled a Miꞌkmaq dictionary and collected numerous legends, and through his published work, was the first to introduce the stories of Glooscap to the wider world. The mission was dissolved in 1870. After a long period of disagreement with the Baptist church, he eventually returned to the church in 1885.

==== Miꞌkmaq hockey sticks ====
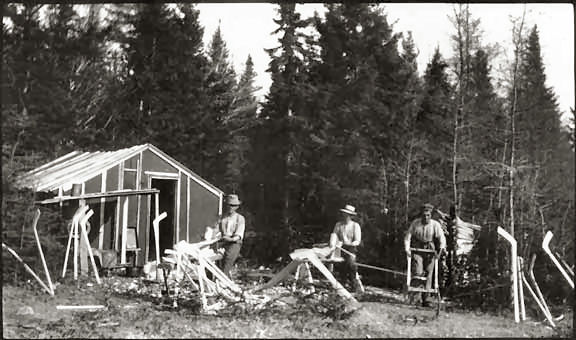
Miꞌkmaq making hockey sticks from hornbeam trees (Ostrya virginiana) in Nova Scotia c. 1890.

The Miꞌkmaq practice of playing ice hockey appeared in recorded colonial histories from as early as the 18th century. Since the nineteenth century, the Miꞌkmaq were credited with inventing the ice hockey stick. The oldest known hockey stick was made between 1852 and 1856. Recently, it was sold for US$2.2 million. The stick was carved by Miꞌkmaq from Nova Scotia, who made it from hornbeam, also known as ironwood.

In 1863, the Starr Manufacturing Company in Dartmouth, Nova Scotia, began to sell the Mic-Mac hockey sticks nationally and internationally. Hockey became a popular sport in Canada in the 1890s. Throughout the first decade of the 20th century, the Mic-Mac hockey stick was the best-selling hockey stick in Canada. By 1903, apart from farming, the principal occupation of the Miꞌkmaq on reserves throughout Nova Scotia, and particularly on the Shubenacadie, Indian Brook, and Millbrook Reserves, was producing the Mic-Mac hockey stick. The department of Indian Affairs for Nova Scotia noted in 1927 that the Miꞌkmaq remained the "experts" at making hockey sticks. The Miꞌkmaq continued to make hockey sticks until the 1930s, when the product was industrialized.

==== Gallery of 19th-century images ====
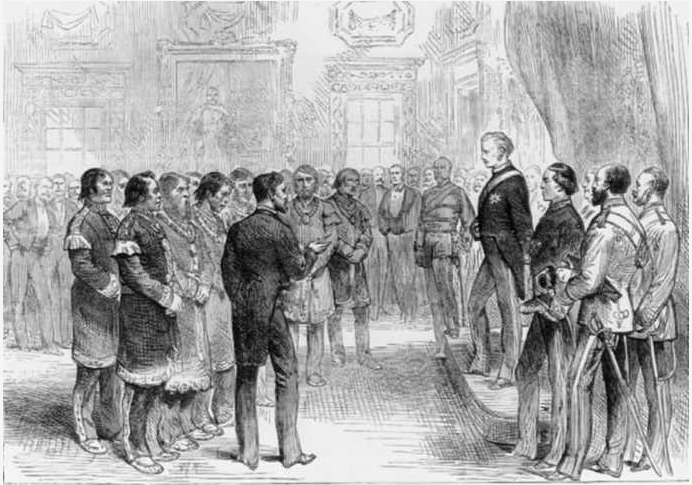
Grand Chief Jacques-Pierre Peminuit Paul (3rd from left with beard) meets Governor General of Canada, Marquess of Lorne, Red Chamber, Province House, Halifax, Nova Scotia, 1879.

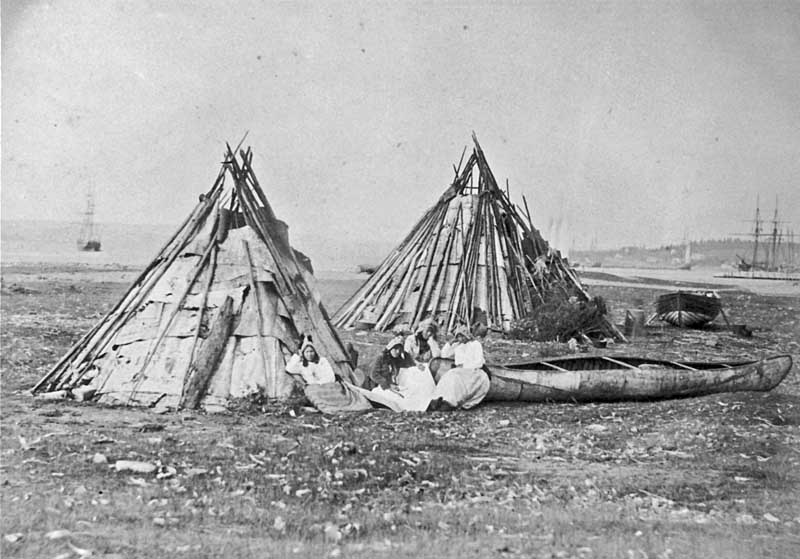
Miꞌkmaq encampment, Sydney, Cape Breton Island

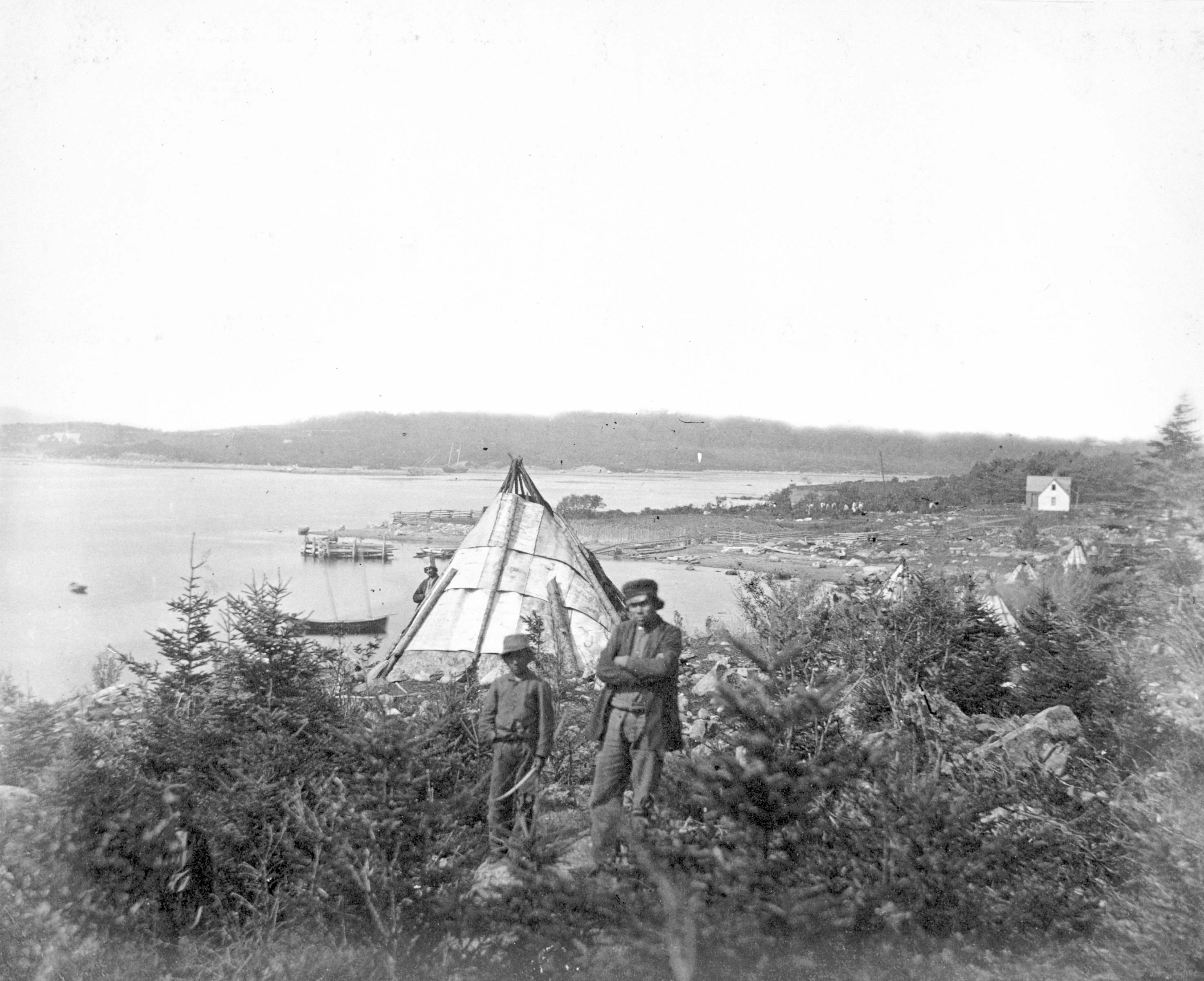
A Miꞌkmaq father and child at Tufts Cove, Nova Scotia, around 1871

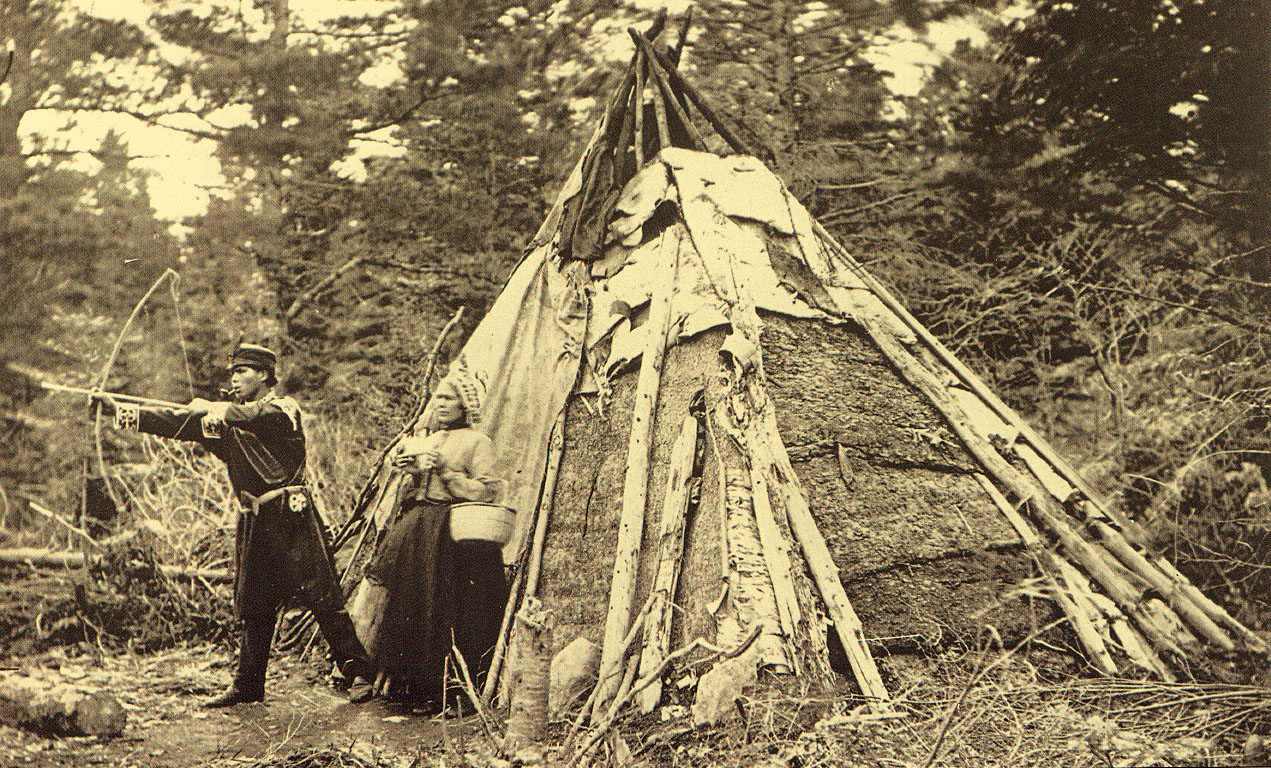
Miꞌkmaq people (1873)

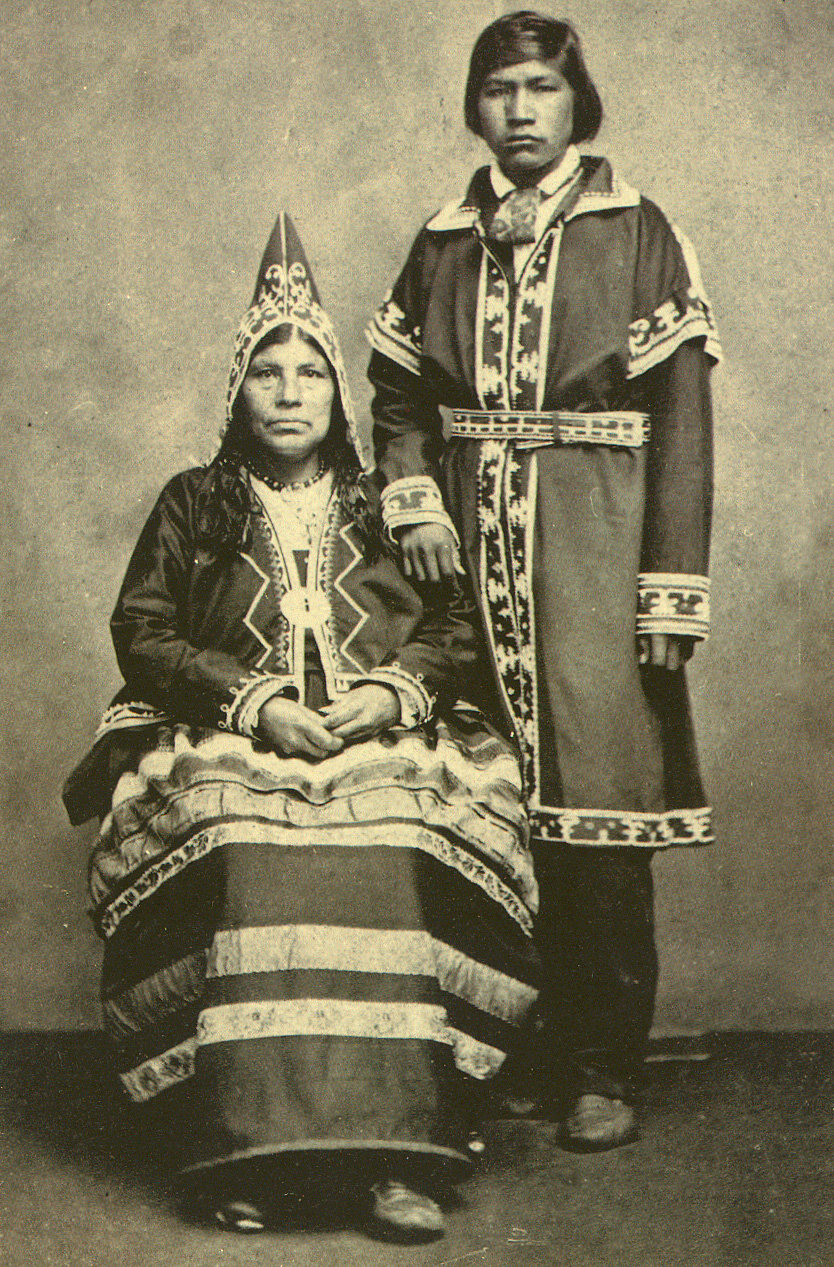
Miꞌkmaq people (1865)

=== 20th and 21st centuries ===
Jerry Lonecloud worked with historian and archivist Harry Piers to document the ethnography of the Miꞌkmaq people in the early 20th century. Lonecloud wrote the first Miꞌkmaq memoir, which his biographer entitled "Tracking Dr. Lonecloud: Showman to Legend Keeper". Historian Ruth Holmes Whitehead writes, "Ethnographer of the Miꞌkmaq nation could rightly have been his epitaph, his final honour."

==== World Wars ====
Over 150 Miꞌkmaq men signed up during World War I. During the First World War, thirty-four out of sixty-four male Miꞌkmaq from Lennox Island First Nation, Prince Edward Island enlisted in the armed forces, distinguishing themselves particularly in the Battle of Amiens. In 1939, over 250 Miꞌkmaq volunteered in World War II. (In 1950, over 60 Miꞌkmaq enlisted to serve in the Korean War.)

==== Miꞌkmaq of Newfoundland ====
When Newfoundland joined Canada in confederation in 1949, political leader (later Premier) Joey Smallwood declared that there were "no Indians in Newfoundland." This ultimately led to the Miꞌkmaq people of Newfoundland not receiving indian status or recognition as First Nations that other Indigenous groups in Canada did in the years following.

In 1972, activists formed the Native Association of Newfoundland and Labrador as the main organization representing the Miꞌkmaq, Innu, and Inuit peoples of Newfoundland and Labrador. After the Labrador Innu and Inuit left the Association in 1975, the organization was renamed as the Federation of Newfoundland Indians. The FNI included six Miꞌkmaq bands (Elmastogoeg First Nations, Corner Brook Indian Band, Flat Bay Indian Band, Gander Bay Indian Band, Glenwood Miꞌkmaq First Nation, and the Port au Port Indian Band). The provincial government supported the FNI.

The federal government approved only the petition for recognition made by the Miꞌkmaq at Conne River. In 1987, the Miawpukek Miꞌkmaq First Nation was recognized under the Indian Act, and their community of Conne River was classified as reserved land for the Miꞌkmaq.

Recognition for the remainder of Newfoundland's Miꞌkmaq was a much longer process. Minister David Crombie was willing to work with the FNI and the government of Newfoundland, but the provincial government considered it to be a federal matter.

In 2003, Minister Andy Scott was presented with a report recommending a First Nations band without any reserved land to represent the Miꞌkmaq of Newfoundland. An Agreement-in-principle was reached in 2006, which the FNI accepted in 2007. The federal government ratified it in 2008.

In 2011, the Government of Canada announced recognition by an order-in-council to a group in Newfoundland and Labrador called the Qalipu First Nation. The new band, which is landless, had accepted 25,000 applications to become part of the band by October 2012. In total over 100,000 applications were sent in to join the Qalipu, equivalent of one-fifth of the province's population. In response, parliament passed Bill C-25, authorizing it to review all applications and retroactively reject some, based on criteria similar to those used in the R v Powley case that defined rights for the Métis people. Several Miꞌkmaq institutions, including the Grand Council, had argued that the Qalipu Miꞌkmaq Band did not have legitimate aboriginal heritage and was accepting too many members.

In 2017, only 18,044 people were eligible for Band membership. In 2018, the Qalipu First Nation announced that the updated Founding Members List for the Band had been adopted by way of an Order in Council which came into effect on June 25, 2018. The 2018 Band list included 18,575 members. In November 2019, after concerns about legitimacy had been addressed, the Qalipu First Nation was accepted by the Miꞌkmaq Grand Council as being part of the Miꞌkmaq Nation. Qalipu Chief Mitchell stated, "Our inclusion into the AFN, APC and acknowledgement by the Miꞌkmaq Grand Council are important to us; it is part of our reconciliation as Miꞌkmaq people. Friendships are being formed, and relationships are being established. It is a good time for the Qalipu First Nation." By 2021, nearly 24,000 people were recognized as founding members, in 67 Newfoundland communities and abroad.

The Friends of Qalipu Advocacy Association is currently taking Qalipu First Nation (and its precursor) to court over the enrolment process.

== Religion, spirituality, and tradition ==
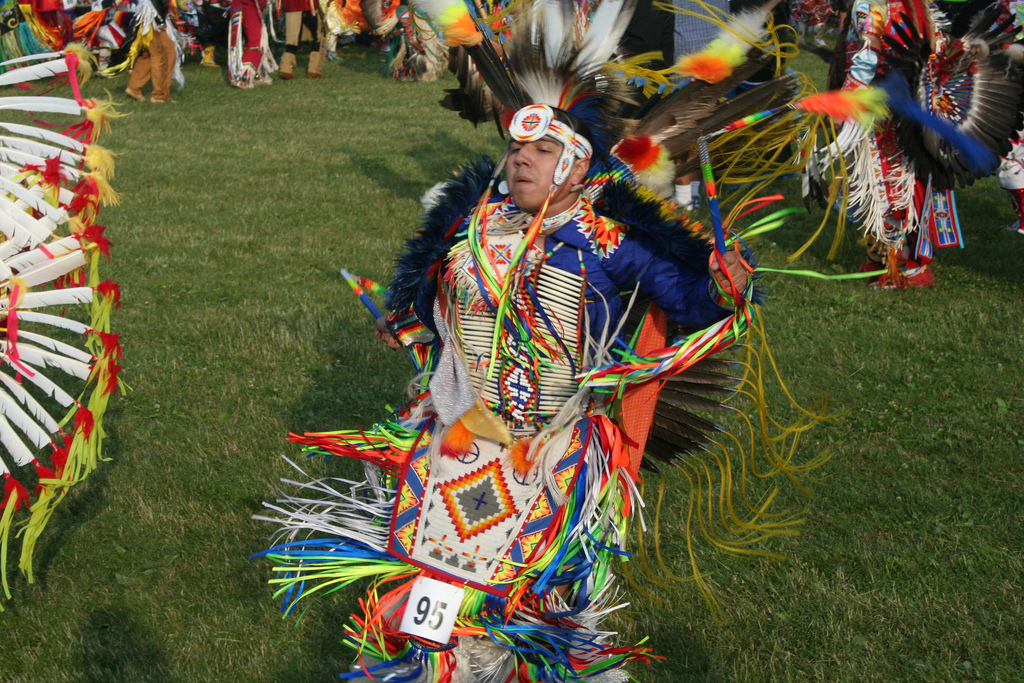
A dancer in the Miꞌkmaq celebration

=== Current forms of Miꞌkmaq faith ===
Some Miꞌkmaq people practice the Catholic faith while some only practice traditional Miꞌkmaq beliefs. However, many have adopted both because they consider both systems compatible.

=== Oral traditions in Miꞌkmaq culture ===
The Miꞌkmaq people had very little in the way of physical recording and storytelling; petroglyphs, while used, are believed to have been rare. In addition, it is not believed that pre-contact Miꞌkmaq had any form of written language. As such, almost all of Miꞌkmaq traditions were passed down orally, primarily via storytelling. There were traditionally three levels of oral traditions: religious narratives, legends, and folklore. This includes Miꞌkmaq creation stories and narratives which account for the organization of the world and society; for instance, how men and women were created and why they are different from one another. The most well-known Miꞌkmaq narratives are those of Glooscap, a creator figure and culture hero. Good storytellers are highly prized by the Miꞌkmaq, as they provide important teachings that shape who a person grows to be, and are sources of great entertainment.

One narrative explains that the Miꞌkmaq once thought that evil and wickedness among men is what causes them to kill each other. This causes great sorrow to the creator-sun-god, who weeps tears that become rains sufficient to trigger a deluge. The people attempt to survive the flood by traveling in bark canoes, but only a single old man and woman survive to populate the earth.

=== Spiritual sites ===
One spiritual capital of the Miꞌkmaq Nation is Mniku, Unama'ki, the gathering place of the Miꞌkmaq Grand Council or Santeꞌ Mawioꞌmi, Chapel Island in Bras d'Or Lake of Nova Scotia. The island is also the site of the St. Anne Mission, an important pilgrimage site for the Miꞌkmaq. The island has been declared a historic site.

=== Ethnobotany ===
Abies balsamea (balsam fir) is traditionally used for a variety of purposes by the Miꞌkmaq. They use the buds, cones and inner bark for diarrhea; the gum for burns, colds, fractures, sores and wounds; the cones for colic; the buds as a laxative; and the bark for gonorrhea. They use the boughs to make beds, the bark to make a beverage, and the wood for kindling and fuel.

== First Nation subdivisions ==
Miꞌkmaq names in the following table are spelled according to several orthographies. The Miꞌkmaq orthographies in use are Miꞌkmaq hieroglyphic writing, the orthography of Silas Tertius Rand, the Pacifique orthography, and the most recent Smith-Francis orthography. The latter has been adopted throughout Nova Scotia and in most Miꞌkmaq communities.

Community	Province/State	Town/Reserve	Est. Pop.	Miꞌkmaw name
Abegweit First Nation	Prince Edward Island	Morell 2, Rocky Point 3, Scotchfort 4	408	Epekwitk
Annapolis Valley First Nation	Nova Scotia	Annapolis Valley First Nation Reserve, St. Croix 34	322	Kampalijek
Bear River First Nation	Nova Scotia	Bear River 6, Bear River 6A, Bear River 6B	386	Lsetkuk
Buctouche MicMac First Nation	New Brunswick	Buctouche 16, Buctouche Miꞌkmaq Band Extension	128	Puktusk
Eel River Bar First Nation	New Brunswick	Eel River 3, Indian Ranch, Moose Meadows 4	828	Ugpiꞌganjig
Elsipogtog First Nation	New Brunswick	Richibucto 15, Soegao No. 35	3,574	Lsipuktuk
Esgenoôpetitj First Nation	New Brunswick	Esgenoôpetitj Indian Reserve No. 14, Pokemouche 13, Tabusintac 9	1,966	Esk~~i~~nuopitijk
Eskasoni	Nova Scotia	Eskasoni 3, Eskasoni 3A, Malagawatch 4	4,737	Wékistoqnik
Fort Folly	New Brunswick	Fort Folly 1	140	Amlamkuk Kwesawék
Glooscap First Nation	Nova Scotia	Glooscap 35, Glooscap Landing Reserve	450	Kluskap
Indian Island First Nation	New Brunswick	Indian Island 28	216	Lnui Menikuk
La Nation Miꞌkmaq de Gespeg	Quebec	(administrative headquarters in Gaspé)	1,811	Kespék
Lennox Island	Prince Edward Island	Lennox Island 1, Lennox Island No. 6, Lennox Island Reserve No. 5	1,080	Lnui Mnikuk
Listuguj Mi'gmaq Government	Quebec	Listuguj	4,336	Listikujk
Membertou	Nova Scotia	Caribou Marsh 29, Malagawatch 4, Membertou 28B Sydney 28A	1,621	Maupeltuk
Metepenagiag Miꞌkmaq Nation	New Brunswick	Big Hole Tract 8 (North Half), Indian Point 1, Metepenagiag Urban Reserve 3, Metepenagiag Urban Reserve 8, Metepenagiag Uta'nk, Red Bank 4, Red Bank 7	717	Metepnákiaq
Miꞌkmaq Nation	Maine	Presque Isle, Limestone	1,489	Ulustuk
Miawpukek	Newfoundland and Labrador	Samiajij Miawpukek	3,100	Miawpukwek
Miꞌkmaqs of Gesgapegiag	Quebec	Gesgapegiag	1,669	Keskapekiaq
Millbrook	Nova Scotia	Beaver Lake 17, Cole Harbour 30, Millbrook 27, Sheet Harbour 36, Truro 27A, Truro 27B, Truro 27C, Tufts Cove Indian Reserve	2,288	Wékopekwitk
Natoaganeg	New Brunswick	Big Hole Tract 8 (South Half), Eel Ground 2, Renous 12	1,101	Natuaqanek
Pabineau First Nation	New Brunswick	Oinpegitjoig Indian Reserve, Pabineau 11	367	Kékwapskuk
Paqtnkek Miꞌkmaq Nation	Nova Scotia	Franklin Manor No. 22 (Part), Paqtnkek-Niktuek No. 23, Welnek No. 38	612	Paq'tnkek
Pictou Landing	Nova Scotia	Boat Harbour West 37, Fisher's Grant 24, Fisher's Grant 24G, Franklin Manor No. 22 (Part), Merigomish Harbour 31	695	Puksaqtéknékatik
Potlotek First Nation	Nova Scotia	Chapel Island 5, Malagawatch 4	827	Potlotek
Qalipu Miꞌkmaq First Nation	Newfoundland and Labrador	(administrative headquarters in Corner Brook)	25,182	Qalipu
Sipekne'katik	Nova Scotia	Indian Brook 14, New Ross 20, Pennal 19, Shubenacadie 13, Wallace Hills No. 14A	2,986	Sipekníkatik
Wagmatcook	Nova Scotia	Malagawatch 4, Margaree 25, Wagmatcook 1	925	Waqm~~i~~tkuk
Wasoqopa'q First Nation	Nova Scotia	Yarmouth 33, Ponhook Lake 10, Medway River 11, Wildcat 12, Gold River 21, Hammonds Plains	1,982	Malikiaq
We'koqma'q L'nue'kati	Nova Scotia	Malagawatch 4, Whycocomagh 2	1,107	Wékoqmáq

== Demographics ==
Year	Population	Verification
1500	4,500	Estimation
1600	3,000	Estimation
1700	2,000	Estimation
1750	3,000	Estimation
1800	3,100	Estimation
1900	4,000	Census
1940	5,000	Census
1960	6,000	Census
1972	10,000	Census
1998	15,000	SIL
2006	20,000	Census
2021	66,748	Census

The pre-contact population is estimated at 3,000–30,000. In 1616, Father Biard believed the Miꞌkmaq population to be in excess of 3,000, but he remarked that, because of European diseases, there had been large population losses during the 16th century. Smallpox and other endemic European infectious diseases, to which the Miꞌkmaq had no immunity, wars and alcoholism led to a further decline of the Native population. It reached its lowest point in the middle of the 17th century. Then the numbers grew slightly again, before becoming apparently stable during the 19th century. During the 20th century, the population was on the rise again. The average growth from 1965 to 1970 was about 2.5%.

== Commemorations ==
The Miꞌkmaq people have been commemorated in numerous ways, including HMCS Miꞌkmaq (R10), and place names such as Lake Miꞌkmaq, and the Mic Mac Mall.

== Notable Miꞌkmaq ==
=== Academics ===
- Pamela Palmater, professor at Toronto Metropolitan University
- Marie Battiste, professor at the University of Saskatchewan

=== Activists ===
- Anna Mae Aquash, activist (1946–1976)
- J. Kevin Barlow, health campaigner
- Nora Bernard, Canadian Indian residential school system activist
- Donald Marshall, Jr., wrongly convicted of murder; later, fought for Miꞌkmaq fishing rights
- Daniel N. Paul, elder, author, tribal historian, columnist, and human rights activist
- Gabriel Sylliboy, Grand Chief of the Miꞌkmaq Nation, 1918 to 1964

=== Artists ===
- Rita Joe, poet
- Ursula Johnson, visual artist
- Nikki Gould, actress, Degrassi: Next Class
- Bretten Hannam, screenwriter and film director
- Candy Palmater, actress, comedienne, and broadcaster
- Amanda Peters, writer
- Morgan Toney, folk singer-songwriter and fiddler
- Jeff Barnaby, film director and screenwriter
- Cody Bowles, drummer, lead singer-Crown Lands
- Catherine Martin, film director and screenwriter
- Alan Syliboy, visual artist, writer, and musician

=== Athletes ===
- Patti Catalano, marathon runner
- Jahkeele Marshall-Rutty, soccer player
- Sandy McCarthy, played for the Calgary Flames ice hockey team
- Everett Sanipass, played for the Quebec Nordiques ice hockey team and the Chicago Blackhawks NHL team.

=== Military ===
- Étienne Bâtard (18th century)
- Chief Jean-Baptiste Cope
- Sam Gloade
- Paul Laurent

=== Other ===
- Peter Paul Toney Babey, a Miꞌkmaq chief and medical practitioner in the 1850s
- Elsie Charles Basque, first Miꞌkmaq to earn a teaching certificate and recipient of the Order of Canada
- Brian Francis, Senator of Canada
- Judge Timothy Gabriel, first Miꞌkmaq judge in Nova Scotia
- Indian Joe, a scout around the time of the American Revolutionary War
- Noel Jeddore, Saqmaw forced into exile (1865–1944)
- Henri Membertou, grand chief and spiritual leader (c. 1525–1611)
- Lawrence Paul, a chief of Millbrook First Nation

== See also ==
- Algonquian peoples
- List of grand chiefs (Mi'kmaq)
- Military history of the Miꞌkmaq
- Mi'kmaq History Month
- Tarrantine

== Archival primary references ==
In chronological order

- 1749 A Geographic History of Nova Scotia. 1749
- 1758 Malliard, Antoine Simon (1758). An account of the customs and manners of the MicMakis and Marichetts Savage Nations.
- 1760 Thomas Picheon
- 1797 Miꞌkmaq Language, 1797
- 1814 Bromley, Walter (1814). Mr. Bromley's second address, on the deplorable state of the Indians delivered in the "Royal Acadian School," at Halifax, in Nova Scotia, March 8, 1814. [Halifax, N.S.?] : Printed at the Recorder Office. ISBN 9780665209987.
- 1822 Bromley, Walter (1822). An account of the aborigines of Nova Scotia called the Micmac Indians. London? : s.n. ISBN 9780665573224.
- 1819 Rand, Silas Tertius (1850). A short statement of facts relating to the history, manners, customs, language, and literature of the Micmac tribe of Indians, in Nova-Scotia and P.E. Island: being the substance of two lectures delivered in Halifax, in November, 1819, at public meetings held for the purpose of instituting a mission to that tribe. Halifax, N.S.? : s.n. ISBN 9780665395062.
- 1866 Vetromile, Eugene (1866). The Abnakis and their history: Historical notices on the aborigines of Acadia. New York : J.B. Kirker. ISBN 9780665339240.
- 1873 An account of the present state of Nova Scotia Hollingsworth. 1873
- Thomas Pichon on Miꞌkmaq
- 1896 Piers, Harry (1896). Relics of the stone age in Nova Scotia. S.l. : s.n. ISBN 9780665353376.
- Rand and the Miꞌkmaqs
- 1922 Speck, Frank (1922). Beothuk and Micmac.

=== Documentary film ===
- Our Lives in Our Hands (1986) — Míkmaq basketmakers and potato diggers in northern Maine
