= Franklin Manor 22 =

Coordinates: 45.54472°N 64.4°W

Location of Franklin Manor 22 in Nova Scotia

Franklin Manor 22 is a Mi'kmaq reserve located in Cumberland County, Nova Scotia. It is administratively split between the Pictou Landing First Nation and the Paq'tnkek First Nation.

The community is named after Nova Scotia Governor Michael Francklin, who spoke Mi'kmaq and whose funeral was attended by hundreds of Mi'kmaq. Franklin Manor, Champs-Élysées, Maccan, and Nappan are villages where the Acadians lived post deportation, in Cumberland County, Nova Scotia, not far from the Beaubassin / Ft. Beausejour area.
