= Lawrence Paul (Millbrook First Nation) =

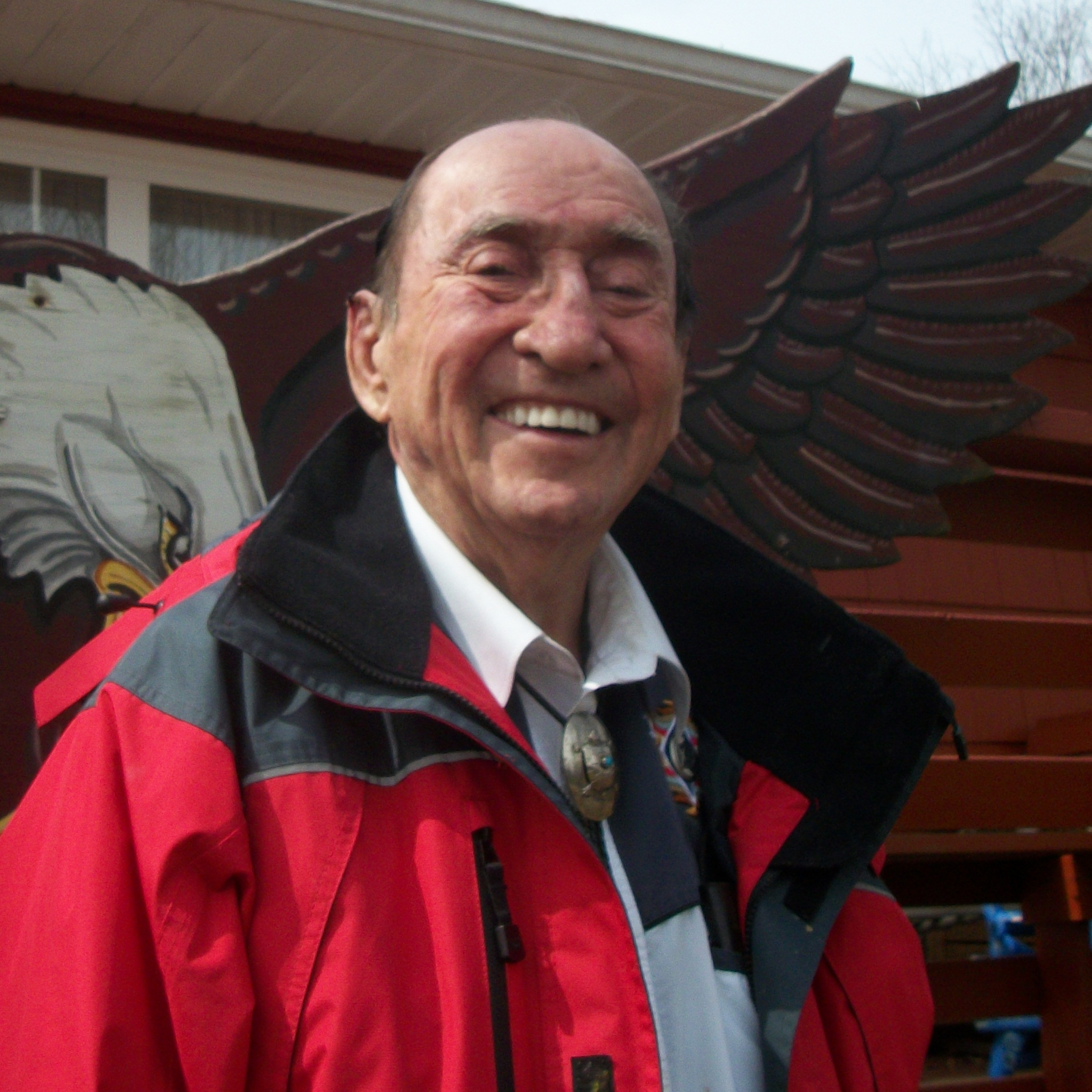
Lawrence Paul (2013)

Lawrence Alexander Paul (July 23, 1934 – May 28, 2014) was a Chief of Millbrook First Nation in Nova Scotia, Canada. First elected a band councillor in 1974, he became chief in 1984 and served continuously in that position until 2012. He has been widely recognized for his leadership which transformed the Millbrook First Nation into a significant economic force in central Nova Scotia.

== Life and career ==
He was born in Saint John, New Brunswick, one of 14 children. At the age of one he moved with his family to the Shubenacadie Indian Reserve, Nova Scotia now, Indian Brook Indian Reserve No. 14, near Shubenacadie, Nova Scotia.

As a young man he served in the Canadian Army and later worked variously in fisheries enforcement, in auto body repair, in construction, as a bookkeeper, and as an economic development officer. He was elected councilor in 1974, serving for four years, and was elected to council again in 1980. In 1984 he ran successfully for Chief of the Millbrook Band at a time when the band was $4 million in debt. Within 2 years, the debt had been eliminated and a new program of economic development had begun.

Paul had determined that the success of the band would be based on its inherent strengths and by working within the prevailing economic and governing structures of the day. Notably, in 2009, he brought the Band onto the board of the regional economic development group, CORDA. In the early 2000s, under his leadership the Band obtained a federal grant and provincial support to build a highway interchange that connected the Millbrook Reserve to Nova Scotia Highway 102, thus opening up the potential of the site for further economic development. The Truro Power Centre was built beside the interchange and the Band now leases the site to aboriginal and non-aboriginal tenants including Tim Hortons, A&W, a Super 8 Motel, and Sobeys/Empire (Studio 7 Cinema). An onshore aquaculture facility that raises Arctic Char is also located on the site as a Band-owned operation. A new housing development was also created nearby. On other Band-owned sites in Nova Scotia, Millbrook First Nation also made significant band and partnered investments under his tenure as Chief, including a new building to house a General Dynamics helicopter support facility on its Cole Harbour Reserve, a wind energy project, and a planned deep-water port in Melford, Nova Scotia. At Sheet Harbour and Joggins, it has developed wharf facilities and maintains small fishing fleets.

Lawrence Paul, who had won 14 consecutive two-year terms as chief, was defeated in the 2012 Band Council election by long-time councillor Robert Gloade. Prior to the election, Paul had briefly contemplated running for chief of the Indian Brook and ultimately ran there after his defeat in Millbrook. However, he was defeated by band councillor Rufus Copage.

He continued to mentor members of Band Council until his death in May 2014.

== Recognition ==
In recognition of his efforts on behalf of Millbrook First Nation, Lawrence Paul has received numerous awards and honours, including the Individual Economic Developer of the Year Award by EDO, the Canadian Aboriginal Economic Development Officers (CANDO) in 2004. and an Honorary doctor of Laws from Saint Marys University.

== Personal life ==
He has been married three times. He had seven children, Terry Paul, Sharon Touchie, Jack Paul, Cindy Paul, Shawn Paul, Lance Paul and Chantelle Larocque. Shawn died as a young man. His brother is the writer and historian Daniel N. Paul.
