= Malagawatch 4 =

Mi'kmaq reserve located in Inverness County, Nova Scotia

Coordinates: 45°53′22″N 60°58′10″W

Malagawatch 4 in Nova Scotia

Malagawatch 4 is a Mi'kmaq reserve located in Inverness County, Nova Scotia.

It is administered jointly by the following First Nations governments, each of which is responsible for 1/5 of the territory and inhabitants:

- Waycobah First Nation
- Wagmatcook First Nation
- Membertou First Nation
- Eskasoni First Nation
- Potlotek First Nation
