= Lennox Island 6 =

Island Reserve

Coordinates: 46°19′39″N 63°48′51″W

Lennox Island 6 in Prince Edward Island

Lennox Island 6 is a Mi'kmaq reserve located on Bedeque Bay in Prince County, Prince Edward Island. There are currently no residents.

Lennox Island 6 is located in Fernwood, Prince Edward Island, approximately 9 km (5.6 mi) west of the community of Bedeque.

It is administratively part of the Lennox Island First Nation.

== History ==
The Mi'kmaq have inhabited the lands comprising present-day Prince Edward Island for over 10,000 years.

The reserve named Lennox Island 1 is notable for being the first reserve in Canada owned by its people, having been purchased in 1878 by the Aboriginal Protection Society.

The land known as Lennox Island 6 was acquired by the Lennox Island First Nation in 2009.
