= Truro 27A =

Coordinates: 45°19′30.42″N 63°17′19.69″W

Truro 27A in Nova Scotia

Truro 27A is a Mi'kmaq reserve located in Colchester County, Nova Scotia.

It is administratively part of the Millbrook First Nation.
