= Millbrook First Nation =

First Nation in Nova Scotia, Canada

The Millbrook First Nation (Mi'kmaq: Wékopekwitk Miꞌkmaq) is a Mi'kmaq First Nation band government in Nova Scotia, Canada.

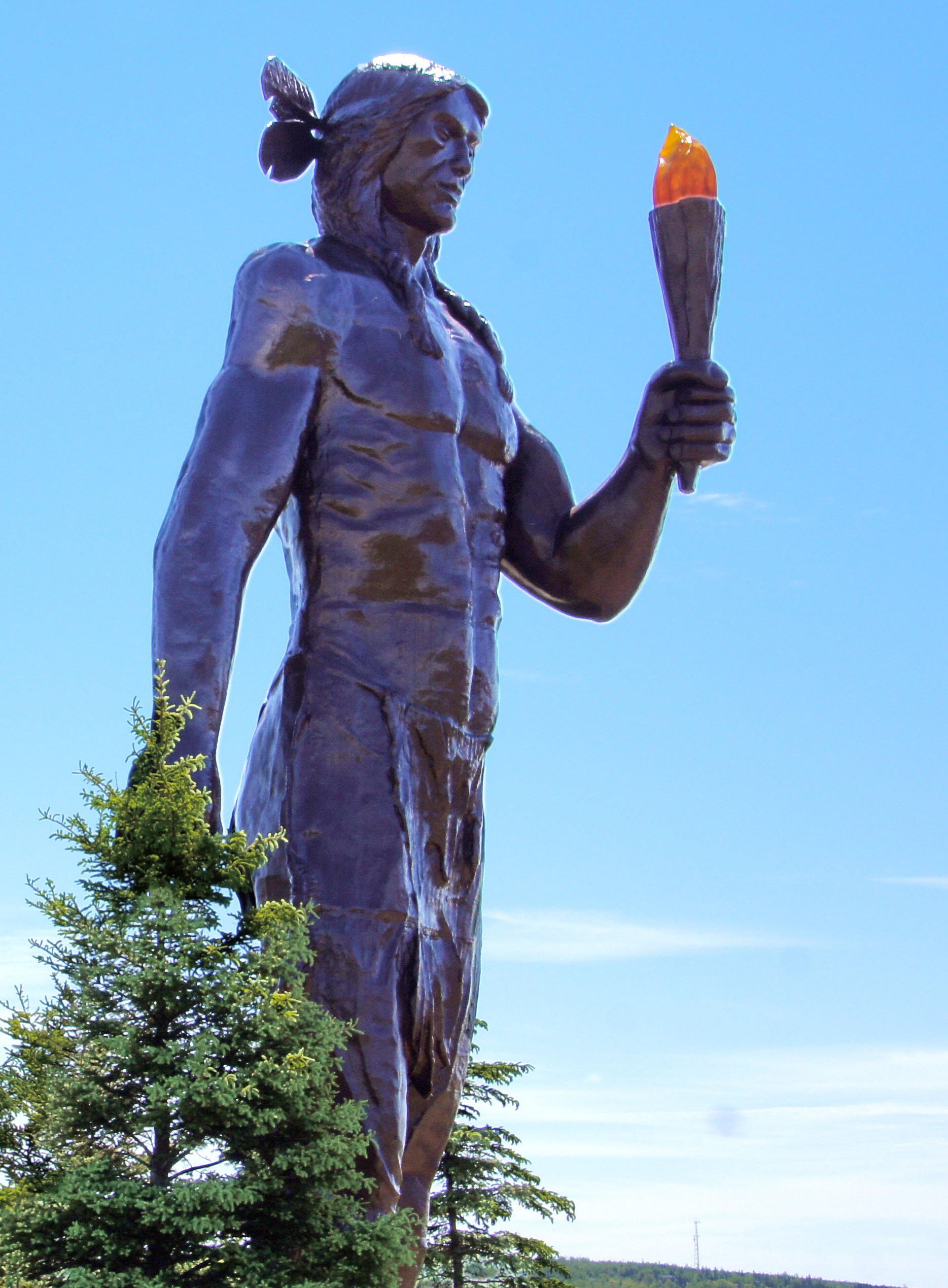
Glooscap monument in Millbrook 27

== Reserves ==
Millbook First Nation has seven reserves:

Community	Area	Location	Population	Date established
Beaver Lake 17	49.4 hectares (122 acres)	78.4 km. northeast of Halifax	20	March 3, 1867
Cole Harbour 30	18.6 hectares (46 acres)	9.6 km. east of Halifax	208	March 3, 1880
Millbrook 27	302.0 hectares (746 acres)	8 km. south of Truro	921	March 3, 1886
Sheet Harbour 36	32.7 hectares (81 acres)	91.2 km. northeast of Halifax	10	March 3, 1915
Truro 27A	16.7 hectares (41 acres)	Joined south of Truro town limit	0	March 3, 1904
Truro 27B	16.4 hectares (41 acres)	Joined with 27A on south	0	March 3, 1907
Truro 27C	9.5 hectares (23 acres)	Joined with 27B on south	0	March 3, 1909

== Band Chiefs ==
Chief	Period	Terms
Lawrence Paul	1984-2012	14
Bob Gloade	2012–present	3

== Notable residents ==
- Activist Nora Bernard was a member of Millbrook.
- Former long-serving Band chief Lawrence Paul
- Artist Alan Syliboy
