= Mi'kmaq–Nova Scotia–Canada Tripartite Forum =

Political forum in Canada

The Mi'kmaq–Nova Scotia–Canada Tripartite Forum was established in 1997 to provide the Mi'kmaq, Nova Scotia, and Canada a place to resolve issues of mutual concern. The Forum's vision is to develop Mi'kmaw communities and foster positive relationships with other Nova Scotians.

On February 23, 2007, the Mi'kmaq–Nova Scotia–Canada Framework Agreement was created for the Made-in-Nova Scotia Process. The Framework Agreement confirms each party's commitment to work "to resolve Mi'kmaq rights issues through negotiation in a spirit of reconciliation." The intent of the Agreement is to: Enhanced legal clarity on rights issues; Improved relations; and Reduced social and economic disparity.

On August 31, 2010, the Assembly of Nova Scotia Mi'kmaq Chiefs signed a historic agreement with the governments of Canada and Nova Scotia. The Mi'kmaq–Nova Scotia–Canada Consultation Terms of Reference lays out a process for the parties to follow when governments wish to consult with the Mi'kmaq.

== Mi'kmaw Kina'matnewey ==
One of the successes of the Mi'kmaq–Nova Scotia–Canada Tripartite Forum is the Nova Scotia government and the Mi'kmaq community have made the Miꞌkmaw Kinaꞌmatnewey, which is the most successful First Nation Education Program in Canada. In 1982, the first Mi'kmaq operated school opened in Nova Scotia. By 1997, all education for Mi'kmaq on reserves were given the responsibility for their own education. There are now 11 band-run schools in Nova Scotia. Now Nova Scotia has the highest rate of retention of aboriginal students in schools in the country. More than half the teachers are Mi'kmaq. From 2011 to 2012, there was a 25% increase of Mi'kmaq students going to university. Atlantic Canada has the highest rate of aboriginal students attending university in the country.
