= Potlotek First Nation =

Mi'kmaw community in northeastern Nova Scotia

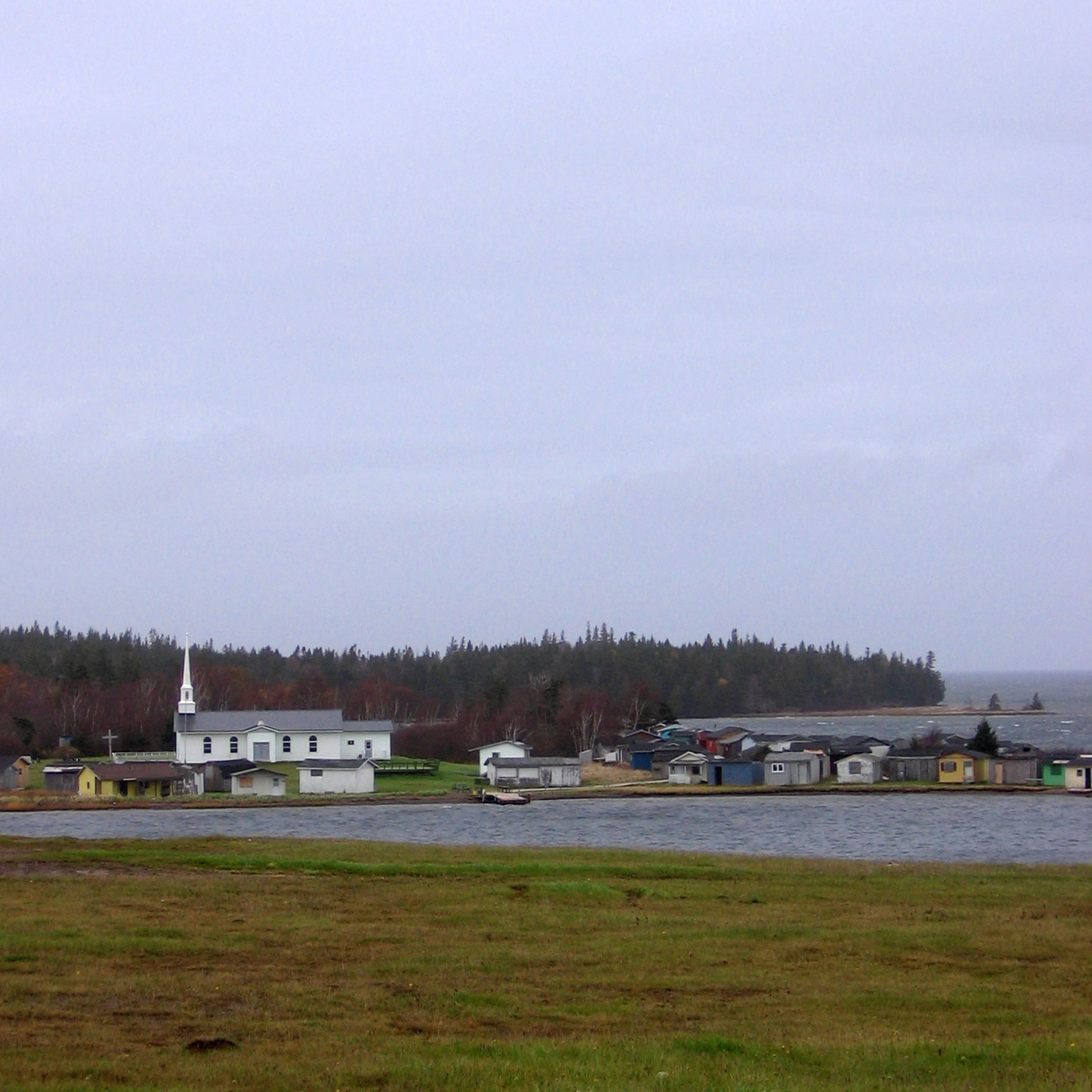
Chapel Island, from which the First Nation takes its name.

Potlotek First Nation, also known as Chapel Island, is a Mi'kmaq community in the Canadian province of Nova Scotia, located in Richmond County. As of August 2023, the First Nation has approximately 837 band members living on and off reserve.

== Composition ==
Chapel Island First Nation is composed of two parts as shown:

Community	Area	Location	Population	Date established
Chapel Island 5	592.5 hectares (1,464 acres)	69 km southwest of Sydney	837	July 1, 1792
Malagawatch 4 (1/5 share)	661.3 hectares (1,634 acres)	62 km southwest of Sydney	0	August 2, 1833
