= Friends of Qalipu =

Canadian non-profit organization

Friends of Qalipu Advocacy Association
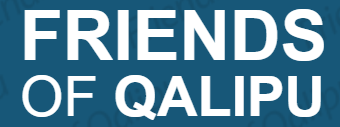
- Nickname: FOQ
- Formation: April 1, 2013; 13 years ago 20 December 2017 (incorporated)
- Founded at: Newfoundland and Labrador
- Legal status: Non-profit
- Purpose: Activism, Indigenous rights, Plaintiff
- Headquarters: Oakville, Ontario
- Members: 730 (2018)
- Board of directors: Helen Darrigan Pauline Tessier John Bouzanne
- Website: https://friendsofqalipu.ca/
- Formerly called: Friends of Qalipu Applicants (2013-2017)

The Friends of Qalipu Advocacy Association ('Qalipu' Pronounced: ha-lee-boo, meaning: Caribou), is a non-profit Newfoundland and Labrador group that are representing rejected applicants to the Qalipu Mi'kmaq First Nation.

== Background ==
When Newfoundland joined Canada in confederation in 1949, political leader (later Premier) Joey Smallwood declared that there were "no Indians in Newfoundland." This ultimately led to the Miꞌkmaq people of Newfoundland not receiving indian status or recognition as First Nations that other indigenous groups in Canada did in the years following. In 1973, the Federation of Newfoundland Indians was established with the goal of gaining Federal recognition of Newfoundland's Mi'kmaq. By 1984, the Conne River Mi'kmaq community on the South Coast of Newfoundland were given Status Indians recognition under the Indian Act. Five years later (1989), the Federation of Newfoundland Indians took Ottawa to court seeking eligibility for registration under the Indian Act. That resulted in a 2008 agreement between the Federation of Newfoundland Indians and the Government of Canada to establish a landless band for Mi'kmaq in the province.

As the application process for enrolment in the soon-to-be-named Qalipu First Nation Mi'kmaq Band dragged on, over 100,000 people applied for inclusion in the band; this was a great surprise to Federation of Newfoundland Indians and federal representatives. This put the enrolment process to a halt and the supplemental agreement between the Federation of Newfoundland Indians and Canada was formed in 2013. This agreement tightened rules and criteria thus leaving 80,000+ applicants rejected in its wake.

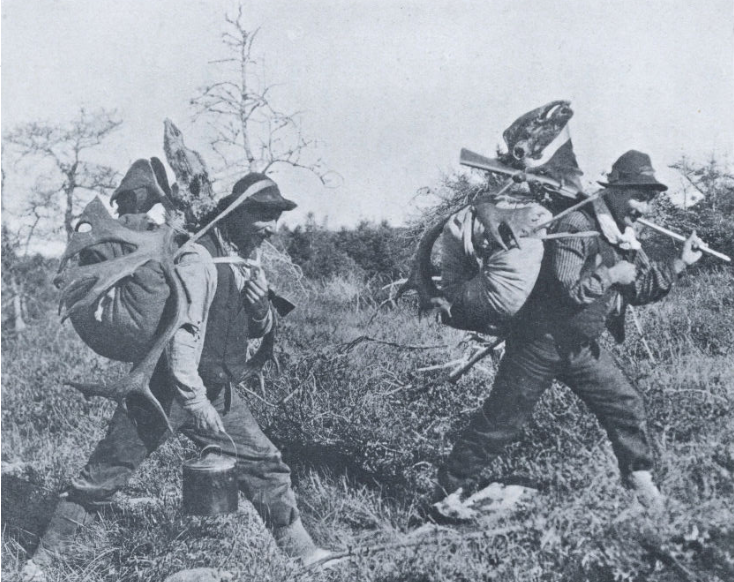
Newfoundland Mi'kmaq men John Hinks and Steve Bernard, 1907

== Formation and Court Cases ==
In April 2013, the Friends of Qalipu Applicants group was formed by two rejected applicants to the Qalipu Mi'kmaq First Nation Band, Helen Darrigan and Pauline Tessier. Their mission at the time was "to provide an independent forum for applicants and members of the Qalipu First Nation and to bring greater public awareness to an enrolment process that was headed for trouble." The group attained a large following in the years following formation. In January 2017, John Bouzanne joined the group and soon after the group began consultations with law firms to challenge the supplemental agreement on behalf of the rejected applicants.

They ultimately obtained the services of Browne Fitzgerald Morgan and Avis of St. John's, NL. To represent their case, six rejected applicants: Shawn Benoit, Matthew Anderson, Marie Tapp Melanson, Bobbie Tapp Goosney, Paul Bennett, and Jennifer Sue Le Roux (known as Benoit et al.) were chosen to initiate the case in the Newfoundland Supreme Court. Their argument in court is primarily based around the idea that the Federation of Newfoundland Indians membership, the predecessor to Qalipu Mi’kmaq First Nation, did not have the opportunity to ratify the Supplemental Agreement in 2013 which is stated as a direct contravention of their rights as the membership of the Federation of Newfoundland Indians.

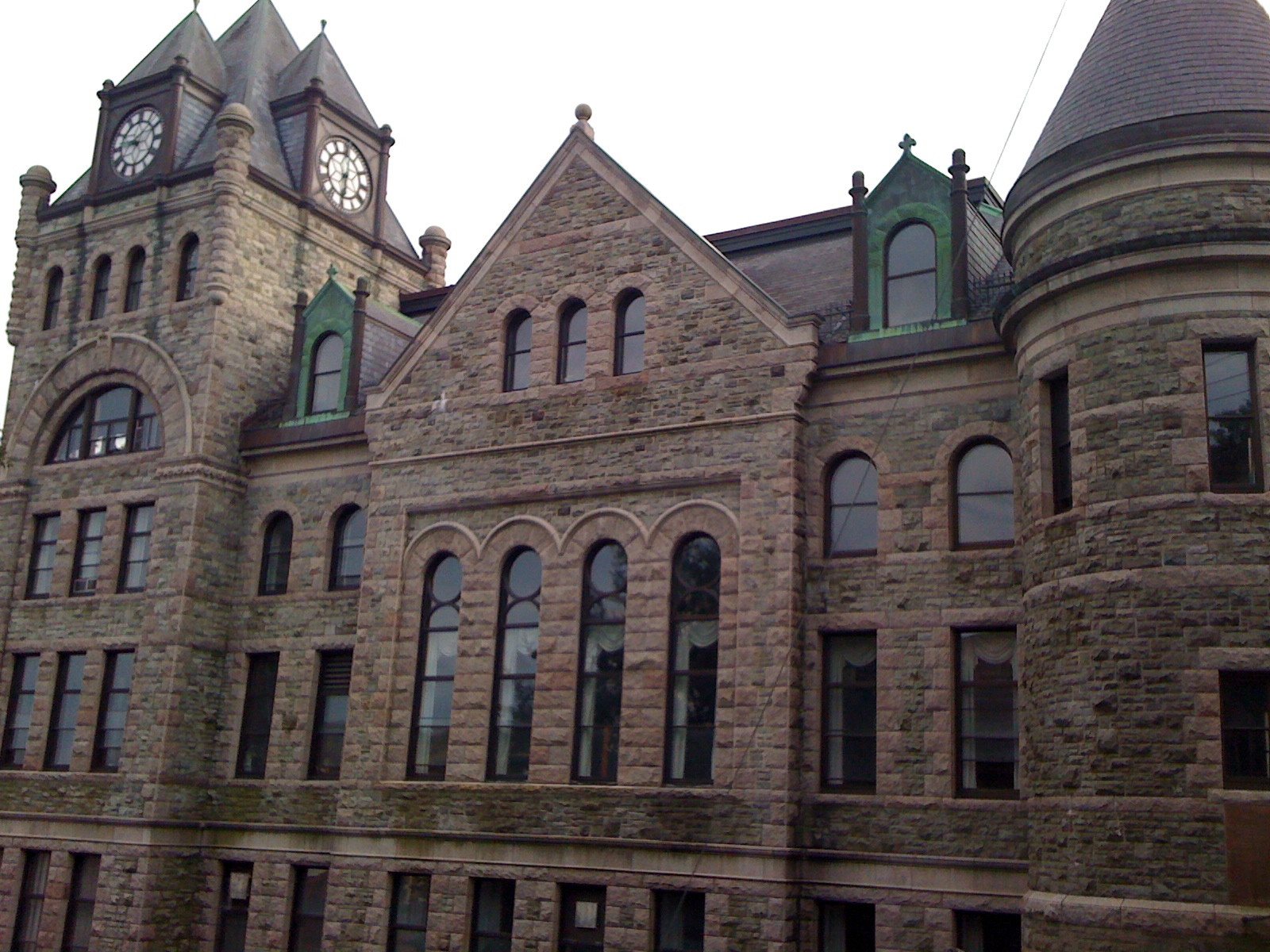
Courthouse of the Supreme Court of Newfoundland and Labrador

A court injunction, to stop the removal of Indian Status cards from rejected applicants previously accepted, hearing at the Supreme Court of Newfoundland happened in June 2018 which resulted in a declaratory order in the favour of Benoit et al.

During a subsequent hearing in November 2019, it came to light that in April 2018 that CBC Newfoundland and Labrador had a 2013 document that was a part of the negotiations with the Federal Government concerning the enrolment process and membership in the future band. Counsel for the Federation of Newfoundland Indians threatened an injunction and the CBC halted the release of the document. Shortly thereafter, an unauthored website entitled “Qalipu Secrets” was discovered online. Listed on the unknown website was the Indemnity Agreement and further privileged documents, which the band released to the public shortly thereafter. In a rapid viral manner, the documents were dispersed across various online platforms and were spread. These documents were then included as substantial evidence in the Benoit et al. case by the Friends of Qalipu's counsel. Lawyers for the Federation of Newfoundland Indians then asserted Solicitor-Client Privilege despite the widespread sharing of the documents. A court justice, of the Supreme Court of Newfoundland and Labrador, later found the documents were “subject to solicitor-client privilege held by the FNI” but such privilege had “been waived by the FNI” due to acquiescence. Counsel for the Federation of Newfoundland Indians (FNI) then controversially appealed this decision and lost.

Friends of Qalipu has a membership of over 1,045 as of January 2023. They lodged a case entitled "Benoit et al." in January 2023 in the Supreme Court of Newfoundland and Labrador. In June 2023, the Supreme Court issued a judgement that although required the five plaintiffs in the case for a reassessment, did not overturn the 2013 agreement.

== See also ==
- Qalipu First Nation
- Miꞌkmaq
- Newfoundland
