= Chapel Island 5 =

Mi'kmaq reserve in Nova Scotia, Canada

Coordinates: 45.695°N 60.771°W

Location of Chapel Island 5 in Nova Scotia

Chapel Island 5 is a Mi'kmaq reserve located in Richmond County, Nova Scotia. Its Míkmaq name is Potlotek and it is the spiritual capital of the Míkmaq Nation and the gathering place of the Míkmaq Grand Council, Mniku.

Chapel Island 5 is administratively part of the Chapel Island First Nation.

Chapel Island 5 is also the site of the St. Anne Mission, an important pilgrimage site for the Míkmaq. The island has been declared a National Historic Site of Canada.
