= Truro 27C =

Human settlement in Canada

Coordinates: 45°18′41.32″N 63°17′28.96″W

Truro 27C in Nova Scotia

Truro 27C is a Mi'kmaq reserve located in Colchester County, Nova Scotia.

It is administratively part of the Millbrook First Nation.
