= J. Kevin Barlow =

Canadian activist

J. Kevin Barlow is a Mi'kmaq from the Indian island of New Brunswick. He is a former chief executive officer of the Canadian Aboriginal AIDS Network (CAAN).

Barlow worked in the aboriginal health field for over 25 years. He has presented his research in New Zealand, the United States, Mexico, and across Canada, exploring challenges in international HIV prevention and AIDS education.

He has worked primarily in the HIV/AIDS sector, and is Principal Investigator on a number of grants exploring cultural competence, mental health, and historical trauma. His leadership and advocacy earned him a national award for excellence in aboriginal programming in 2006.

== Publications ==
- J. Kevin Barlow, EXAMINING HIV/AIDS AMONG THE ABORIGINAL POPULATION IN CANADA: in the post-residential school era (2003), found at PDF
