= Mi'kmaq History Month =

Nova Scotia native cultural celebration

Mi'kmaq History Month or Mi’kmaw History Month is promoted annually in Nova Scotia as a month dedicated to building public awareness of Mi'kmaw culture and heritage, taking place in the month of October. It was proclaimed in 1993 by then-Premier John Savage and Mi'kmaq Grand Chief Ben Sylliboy.

The month of October was chosen because, in the British–Mi'kmaq Treaty of 1752, October 1st was designated as the date on which the Mi’kmaw people would receive gifts from the Crown to "renew their friendship and submissions." This day is celebrated as Treaty Day in Nova Scotia.

Activities and events that share and showcase Mi’kmaw history take place across Nova Scotia. Events in schools include in-class studies, assemblies, special events and visits from special guests. Other events include the annual Wagmatcook Aboriginal Arts and Culture Festival, lectures, flag raising, and basket-making workshops.

== Years ==
Some Mi'kmaq History Month posters have had a theme. The taglines have been recorded here as they are on English posters. The posters are available in Mi'kmaw, English, and French, and can be downloaded from the official website. They are also distributed in schools throughout the province.

- 1998/1999/2001 - Reflections of the Past, Realities of the Present, Dreams of the Future.
- 2000- Share a Moment, Share a Culture
- 2003- Striving for a Better Tomorrow
- 2004- Sharing Our Culture Through Music, Song, and Dance
- 2005- Remembering Our Smaknisk
- 2006- Mi’kmaq Sante’ Mawio’mi • Traditional Mi’kmaw Leadership
- 2007- Pa'skite'kemk • Mi'kmaw Basketry
- 2008 - Ta'n Telo'ltipmi'k L'nu Mi'kma'kik • How the Mi'kmaq Live in Mi'kma'kik
- 2009 - L’nuey Maskwiey Pqa’w Kwitn • Mi’kmaw Birchbark Canoe
- 2010 - A Culture to Celebrate, a Time to Share • Miwiwatmik Ta’n Telo’ltimk, I’kaq Mawi-apoqnmatultimk
- 2011 - Sites of Cultural and Sacred Significance
- 2012- "All My Relations"
- 2013 - Kawie'l Pu'taliewe'l • Porcupine Quill Baskets
- 2014 - Communication
- 2015 - Wapna’kikewaq • People of the Dawn
- 2016 - Reconciliation & Resilience (Also "30 Years of Mi'kmaq Treaty Day").
- 2017 - Innovations and Legacies
- 2018 - World War One Mi'kmaq Veterans
- 2019 - L'nui'sultinej • Let's Speak Mi'kmaw
- 2020 - Sqaliaqnn Tel-nenmumkl aqq Tel-we’wmumkl • Plant Knowledge and Use
- 2021 - Exploring Treaties and Treaty Relationships
- 2022 - Mi’kmaw Beadwork & the Art of Beading
- 2023 - Mi’kmaw Sports, Traditional Games, and Pastimes. This theme was chosen as in 2023, K’jipuktuk was the host site for the North American Indigenous Games.
- 2024 - Food and its significance in Mi'kmaw culture
- 2025 - A’tukwemk aq A’tukowinu’k – Storytelling and Storytellers
