= Melford, Nova Scotia =

Community in Nova Scotia, Canada

Coordinates: 45°52′13.47″N 61°15′38.86″W

Melford in Nova Scotia

Melford is a small community in the Canadian province of Nova Scotia, located in Inverness County. Formerly known as Upper Settlement River Denys, the name was changed to Melford in 1884.

== See also ==
- River Denys
