= Lennox Island First Nation =

Coordinates: 46°36′39.1″N 63°51′9.9″W

- Band No. 2
- Mi'kmaq
- People: Mi'kmaq
- Headquarters: 2 Eagle Feather Trail, Lennox Island, PE; C0B 1J0

Land
- Main reserve: Lennox Island 1
- Reserves: Lennox Island 5; Lennox Island 6
- Land area: 5.4 km^{2} (2.1 sq mi)

Population (March 2025)
- On reserve: 415
- On other land: 8
- Off reserve: 685
- Total population: 1,108

Government
- Chief: Tabatha Bernard (2025–present)
- Council size: 4
- Council: Charlene Campbell; Madlene Sark; Julie Pellissier–Lush

Tribal Council
- Epekwitk Assembly of Councils, Inc.

Website
- lennoxisland.com

Lennox Island is a Mi'kmaq First Nations band government in the Canadian province of Prince Edward Island. Its only currently inhabited reserve is Lennox Island 1, on Lennox Island, purchased by the Aborigines' Protection Society on behalf of the Mi'kmaq of Prince Edward Island in 1870 or 1878. The band has two other reserves, Lennox Island 5, located in East Bideford, and Lennox Island 6, located in Fernwood, both acquired in the 2000s.

== History ==
The band government was originally known as "L'nui Minegoo" or the Indian/People's Island, and later known as the Lennox Island Reserve or the Lennox Island Band. It was named after Charles Lennox, Duke of Richmond, by Samuel Holland; surveyor. Original permanent inhabitants included Chief Francis Francis who resided there after the Mi'kmaq were displaced from Cortin Island. The Saint Ann Mission was later established on the island.

In 1880, the Department of Indian Affairs reported that new houses and barns had been built on the island, and that a Superintendent and school teacher was instructing the community in agriculture.

During the early 1890s, "Acting Chief" Joseph Francis, elected by a simple band majority, refused to resign when the son of the deceased "Chief" came to "the necessary age." James Yeo, a Liberal representative for Prince Edward Island in the House of Commons of Canada and a Lennox Island Land Commissioner, arranged for a justice of the peace to have Francis sworn in as "Chief of Prince Edward Island Micmac Indians," a lifetime appointment. John Thomas Sark, the son of the deceased "Chief," organized his own faction to challenge Yeo and Francis. The Dominion Department of Indian Affairs sought to integrate Lennox Island into a Canadian survey for mandated band electoral systems, culminating in an 1897 general election. During the 1890s campaigns, Sark likewise contended that any elections for "Chief" should be for "royal" lifetime tenure, thereby circumventing the proposed, and then mandated, triennial parameters. Since Prince Edward Island joined the Canadian Confederation in 1873, the Mi'kmaq band had been under the jurisdiction of the Dominion Department and the 1867 Indian Act of Canada. After 1873, the House of Assembly neither routinely deliberated, nor passed legislation for, Mi'kmaq peoples in the province. The role of Prince Edward Island "amalgamation" debates and hyperdescent ideas on "universal" suffrage in this accelerated moment for Maritime Mi'kmaq band "modernities," both on and off the reserve, nevertheless remains a subject of scholarly inquiry.

In 1972, for political and geographic reasons, a vote was held which decided to split reserves Morell 2, Rocky Point 3, and Scotchfort 4 from Lennox Island First Nation and form a new band government, Abegweit First Nation.

In 1973, a bridge was built connecting Lennox Island to the rest of Prince Edward Island.
