= Kevin Barrow =

Trinidadian football player

Personal information
- Place of birth: San Fernando, T&T
- Height: 5 ft 10 in (1.78 m)
- Position: Forward

Team information
- Current team: Atlanta Silverbacks
- Number: 21

Senior career*
Years	Team	Apps	(Gls)
1994–1995	Hyundai San Fernando Giants		
1995-1999	Brooklyn Knights		
2003–2010	Atlanta Silverbacks	7	(0)
- * Club domestic league appearances and goals as of September 1, 2008

Kevin Barrow (born San Fernando, Trinidad and Tobago) is a Trinidadian football (soccer) player who currently plays for the Atlanta Silverbacks of the USL First Division.

Barrow played for Hyundai San Fernando Giants from 1995 to 2002, a club in the TT Pro League. In 2003, Barrow signed with the Atlanta Silverbacks, but saw no first team games until 2008. He spent the 2003 to 2007 seasons playing for the Silverbacks Reserves. According to his player profile on the Atlanta Silverbacks’ site, Barrow played for the Brooklyn Knights in 1998. However, the Knights were not established until 1999.
