= Lennox Island (Prince Edward Island) =

Island in Canada

Coordinates: 46°36′50″N 63°51′14″W

Location of Lennox Island in PEI

Historical population
Year	Pop.	±%
1871	238	—
1921	167	−29.8%
1931	144	−13.8%
1941	116	−19.4%
1988	239	+106.0%
2016	323	+35.1%
2021	308	−4.6%

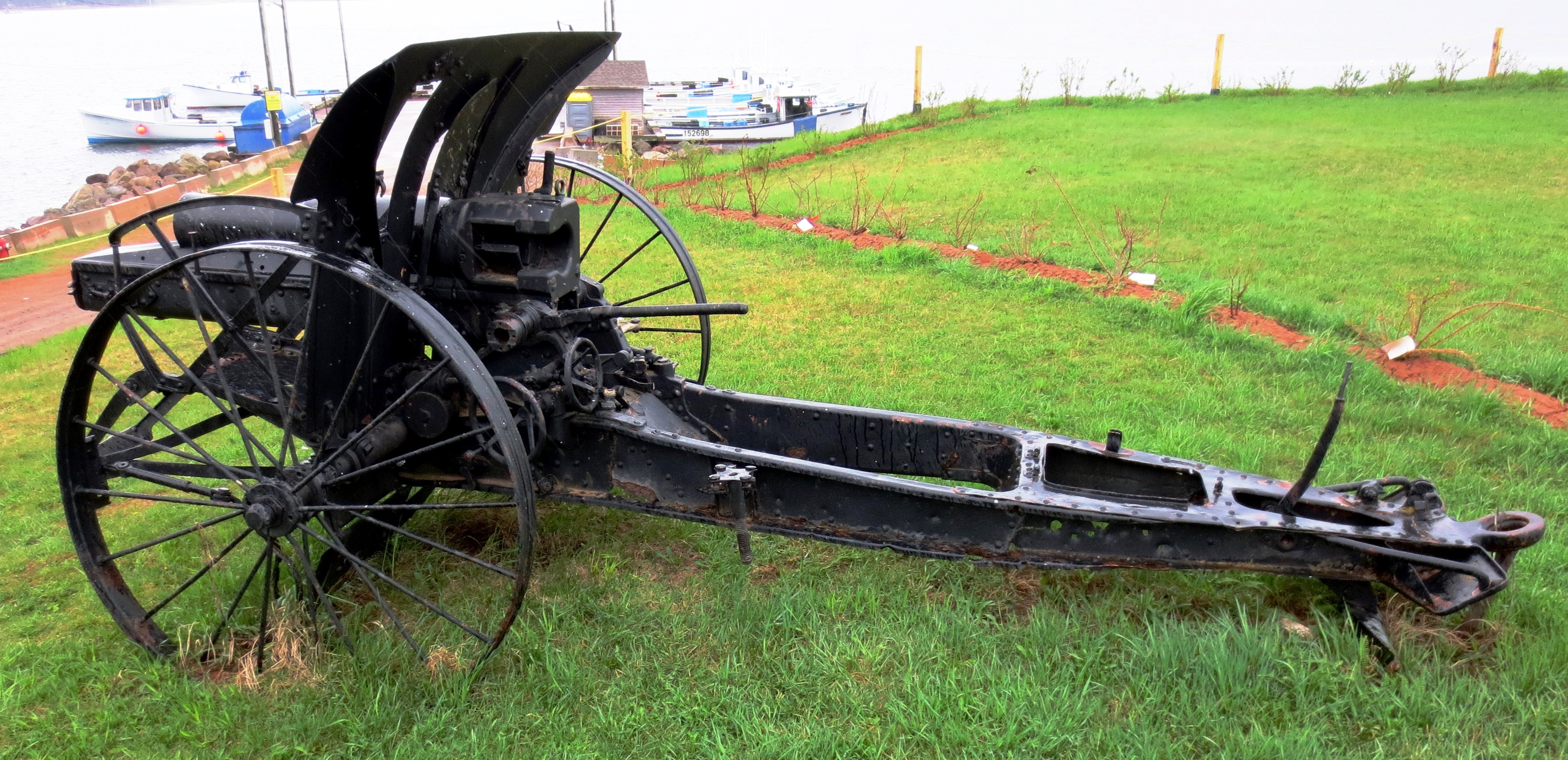
German Great War 10.5-cm leFH 98.09 Howitzer, Lennox Island, Prince Edward Island, Canada

Lennox Island is an island located in Malpeque Bay off the northwest coast of Prince Edward Island, Canada. Connected by a short causeway and bridge, Lennox Island is home to the Lennox Island First Nation, of the Mi'kmaq people. The Mi'kmaq name for the island is L'nui Minegoo, and it has been informally known by European settlers as Indian Island.

Lennox Island is approximately 520 hectares in area.

Most of the trees on the island are spruce, with some groves of birch trees and many different types of berries.

The historic St. Anne Catholic Mission is located on the island.

As of 1988, the population on the island was 239 and the largest commercial activities were peat moss and blueberry production.

According to the Canadian census, the island's population was 323 in 2016 and 308 in 2021.

The Minigoo Fishery (located on Lennox Island) was the first Lobster processing plant owned and operated by indigenous people in Canada in 2010. It later closed its doors and sought bankruptcy protection. It reopened in May 2013.

Due to erosion from rapidly rising ocean levels, it has been estimated that half of Lennox Island will disappear by approximately 2065.
