= List of locations in Canada with an English name =

English place names in Canada is a list of Canadian place names which are named after places in England, carried over by English emigrants and explorers from the United Kingdom and Ireland. The names can also be derived from places founded by people with English surnames.

== Alberta ==
- Amesbury
- Bentley
- Bingley
- Bircham
- Boscombe
- Bowden
- Brocket
- Calgary
- Calthorpe
- Chailey
- Chigwell
- Carnwood
- Didsbury
- Dovercourt
- Drayton Valley
- Dunstable
- Edmonton
- Egremont
- Erith
- Fairview (hamlet)
- Fairview (town)
- Fleet
- Gainford
- Grantham
- Hinton
- Hythe
- Inglewood, Calgary
- Inglewood, Edmonton
- Inglewood, Red Deer
- Keswick
- Redcliff
- Styal
- Taplow
- Torrington
- Vauxhall
- Wembley
- Willingdon
- Wimborne
- Woking
- Wrentham
- Yeoford

== British Columbia ==
- Abbotsford
- Ashcroft
- Barnet
- Barnston
- Boston Bar
- Brentwood
- Colwood
- Cranbrook
- Crofton
- Cumberland
- Derby
- Enderby
- Fort Nelson
- Grantham
- Jesmond
- Kimberley
- Langdale
- Langford
- Langley
- Lytton
- Nelson
- New Brighton
- New Denver
- New Westminster
- Rayleigh
- Revelstoke
- Revelstoke Lake
- Richmond
- Rosedale
- Royston
- Silverdale
- Surrey
- New Westminster
- Vancouver
- Victoria

== Manitoba ==
- Carberry
- Helston
- Ipswich
- Kenton
- Matlock
- Morden
- Oxford House
- Petersfield
- Reston
- Seven Sisters
- Somerset
- St. Clements

== New Brunswick ==
- Andover
- Bath
- Beresford
- Bristol
- Canterbury
- Carleton County
- Gloucester County
- Hampton
- Hanwell
- Hartland
- Hillsborough
- Kent County
- Keswick Ridge
- Lancaster
- Northampton Parish
- Northumberland County
- Norton
- Salisbury
- Sheffield
- Southampton
- Sunbury County
- Sussex
- Sussex Corner
- Westmorland County
- Wickham
- Woodstock
- York County

== Newfoundland and Labrador ==
- Appleton
- Barton
- Brighton
- Bristol's Hope
- Churchill Falls
- Dover
- English Harbour
- Epworth
- Riverhead
- Southport
- Whitbourne
- Windsor

== Nova Scotia ==
- Aldershot
- Alton
- Aylesford
- Barrington
- Bedford
- Berwick
- Bramber
- Bridgetown
- Brighton
- Cambridge
- Canning
- Chelsea
- Chester
- Colchester County
- Cumberland County
- Dartmouth
- Digby
- Dover
- East Dover
- Enfield
- Falmouth
- Halifax
- Hants County
- Hantsport
- Kingston
- Liverpool
- Manchester
- Martock
- Milton
- Oldham
- Osborne Harbour
- Oxford
- Plymouth, Pictou County
- Plymouth, Yarmouth County
- Richmond County
- Roxbury
- Seaforth
- Sherwood
- South End
- Southampton
- Stonehouse
- Tiverton
- Truro
- West Dover
- Weston
- Weymouth
- Windsor
- Yarmouth
- Yarmouth County

== Nunavut ==
- Baker Lake
- Baillie-Hamilton Island
- Bathurst Inlet
- Bathurst Island
- Borden Island
- Brock Island
- Buckingham Island
- Cambridge Bay
- Chesterfield Inlet
- Dundas Harbour
- Ellesmere Island
- Southampton Island

== Ontario ==
- Abingdon
- Acton
- Acton Corners
- Addington
- Admaston-Bromley
- Agincourt
- Aldershot
- Alliston
- Alton
- Alnwick Township
- Alwington
- Amberley
- Amesbury
- Ancaster
- Ashton
- Ajax
- Armadale
- Bailieboro
- Baldwin
- Ballantrae
- Balmoral
- Baltimore
- Bancroft
- Barrie
- Bath
- Bathhurst
- Battersea
- Bayham
- Baxter
- Beardmore
- Beaverton
- Bedford
- Beeton
- Bellingham
- Belton
- Bennington
- Berkeley
- Berwick
- Billings
- Birmingham Lake
- Blackburn
- Blandford
- Bloorcourt Village
- Bloomington
- Bolton
- Boston
- Bracebridge
- Bracondale Hill
- Bradford
- Bradford West Gwillimbury
- Brampton
- Brechin
- Brighton
- Britton
- Brisbane
- Brockton
- Brougham
- Brudenell
- Burford
- Burlington
- Buttonville
- Callander
- Calton
- Cambridge
- Camborne
- Camden East
- Campbell
- Campbellford
- Canborough
- Cannington
- Canton
- Carlisle
- Carling
- Carlington
- Carleton Place
- Carleton Village
- Cavan
- Chatham-Kent
- Chelmsford
- Cheltenham
- Chesley
- Clarington
- Clifford
- Clinton
- Colchester
- Collingwood
- Corbett
- Cornell
- Cornwall
- Courtice
- Crampton
- Croydon
- Cumberland
- Dalton
- Dartford
- Dawson
- Delaware
- Dixon
- Don Valley
- Dorchester
- Dorking
- Dorset
- Dryden
- Dublin
- Dundalk
- Dunsford
- Dufferin County
- Dundas
- Durham
- Dutton
- Earlscourt
- Eatonville
- Eastford
- East Gwillimbury
- Effingham
- Eglinton
- Essex
- Essex County
- Exeter
- Felton
- Finch
- Flinton
- Flamborough
- Fletcher
- Fort York
- Fraserdale
- Georgina
- Gardiner
- Geraldton
- Gotham
- Grantham
- Gravenhurst
- Greensborough
- Greely
- Grimsby
- Gloucester
- Gormley
- Guelph
- Hagarty & Richards
- Halton Hills
- Haldimand
- Haliburton
- Hamilton
- Hampton
- Harrow
- Harris
- Harrington
- Hartington
- Hastings
- Hastings
- Hawkesbury
- Hilton
- Healey Falls
- Hudson
- Hughes
- Huntsville
- Hull
- Hurkett
- Horton
- Hutton
- Ilderton
- Inglewood
- Islington (Etobicoke)
- Jacksonboro
- Jefferson
- Jones
- Johnson
- Kensington Market
- Keswick
- King
- Kingston
- Kipling
- Kitchener
- Lambeth, Middlesex County, Ontario
- Lambeth, Oxford County, Ontario
- Lancaster
- Langford
- Langton
- Lansing
- Latchford
- Leamington
- Ledbury
- Leeds
- Leitrim
- Leaside
- Lexington
- Limehouse
- Lindsay
- Lincoln
- Little Britain
- London
- Lytton Park
- MacKenzie
- Macton
- Maidstone
- Malton
- Manchester
- Mansfield
- Mapleton
- Marlborough
- Markham
- Maryvale
- McDougall
- McGarry
- McInnis
- McKellar
- McMurrich
- McNab-Braeside
- Melbourne
- Merlin
- Middlesex County
- Milliken
- Millington
- Milton
- Mornington
- Navan
- Newark
- Newcastle
- Newington
- Newmarket
- New Liskeard
- Norham
- Newton Robinson
- Nixon
- Nobleton
- Northumberland County
- Norwich
- Norwood
- O'Connell
- O'Connor
- Osgoode
- Oxford County
- Parham
- Patterson
- Peel
- Pefferlaw
- Pembroke
- Penhall
- Pelham
- Perth
- Peterborough
- Peterborough County
- Perry
- Pickering
- Picton
- Pinkerton
- Pilkington
- Pontypool
- Poplar
- Port Arthur
- Port Burwell
- Port Carling
- Port Colborne
- Port Darlington
- Port Dover
- Port Hoover
- Port Hope
- Port Perry
- Port Nelson
- Port Rowan
- Port Royal
- Port Ryerse
- Portsmouth
- Preston
- Putnam
- Queensborough
- Reading
- Reesor
- Renfrew
- Renton
- Rexdale
- Richmond
- Richmond Hill
- Ringwood
- Riverdale
- Rockford
- Romney Township
- Roxborough
- Russell
- Rosedale
- Ryerson
- Salford
- Saltford
- Scarborough
- Seaforth
- Seaton
- Sheffield
- Shelburne
- Shrewsbury
- Simcoe
- Smithfield
- Southampton
- Southwold
- Stamford
- Steeles
- Straffordville
- Stratford
- Sudbury
- Sunbury
- Sunderland
- Sutton
- Tamworth
- Tilbury
- Tiverton
- Thamesford
- Thedford
- Tobermory
- Thornbury
- Thornhill
- Thornton
- Topping
- Tottenham
- Trafford
- Uxbridge
- Vaughan
- Wainfleet
- Walden
- Walford
- Wallace
- Walton
- Walsh
- Walsingham
- Warkworth
- Warwick
- Washington
- Waterford
- Watford
- Wellington
- Wellington North
- Wentworth
- Westminster, Middlesex County
- Westminster, Prescott and Russell United Counties
- Wexford
- Whitby
- Whitchurch
- Whitevale
- Wicklow
- Willowdale
- Winchester
- Windsor
- Winfield
- Wingham
- Woburn
- Woodbridge
- Woodstock
- Wooler
- Worthington
- Wychwood
- Yatton
- York
- York County

== Prince Edward Island ==
- Alberton
- Alexandra
- Annandale-Little Pond-Howe Bay
- Belfast
- Borden-Carleton
- Brackley
- Breadalbane
- Charlottetown
- Clyde River
- Cornwall
- Darlington
- Hampshire
- Hazelbrook
- Kensington
- Kingston
- Linkletter
- Miltonvale Park
- Montague
- Murray Harbour
- Murray River
- Northport
- North Wiltshire
- Parkdale
- O’Leary
- Sherbrooke
- Stratford
- Tyne Valley
- Wellington
- Victoria
- York

== Quebec ==
- Abercorn
- Acton Vale
- Adstock
- Amherst
- Beaconsfield
- Bedford
- Blackpool
- Bolton
- Brigham
- Bristol
- Broughton
- Brownsburg-Chatham
- Bryson
- Buckingham
- Bury
- Campbell's Bay
- Cantley
- Cawood
- Chichester
- Clarendon
- Cleveland
- Chelsea
- Compton
- Cookshire-Eaton
- Crabtree
- Delson
- Dudswell
- Dundee
- Dunham
- Durham
- Farnham
- Frampton
- Franklin
- Godmanchester
- Gore
- Hampden
- Hampstead
- Harrington
- Hatley
- Havelock
- Hemmingford
- Hereford
- Hinchinbrooke
- Hope
- Hudson
- Huntingdon
- Hull
- Kingsbury
- Litchfield
- Lingwick
- Mansfield
- Marston
- Melbourne
- Mulgrave-et-Derry
- New Carlisle
- New Richmond
- Newport
- Orford
- Packington
- Potton
- Price
- Rawdon
- Richmond
- Ripon
- Roxton
- Saint-Honoré-de-Shenley
- Shawville
- Sheenboro
- Shefford
- Sherbrooke
- Shrewsbury
- Stoneham-et-Tewkesbury
- Stratford
- Sutton
- Thetford
- Thorne
- Thurso
- Tingwick
- Upton
- Wakefield
- Waltham
- Warden
- Warwick
- Weedon
- Weir
- Westbury
- Wickham
- Windsor
- Wotton

== Saskatchewan ==
- Aylesbury
- Cudworth
- Cumberland House
- Eston
- Hanley
- Maidstone
- Penzance
- Spalding
- Torquay
- Weldon
- White City
