= 2021 Canadian electoral calendar =

Calendar for elections in Canada

2021 elections in Canada

This is a list of elections in Canada scheduled that were held in 2021. Included are municipal, provincial and federal elections, by-elections on any level, referendums and party leadership races at any level. In bold are provincewide or federal elections (including provincewide municipal elections) and party leadership races.

== January ==
- January 9: Municipal by-election in Zeballos, British Columbia (not held due to lack of candidates)
- January 15: Municipal by-election in Ward 22 Scarborough—Agincourt, Toronto
- January 16: Municipal by-election in the Municipality of the District of St. Mary's, Nova Scotia
- January 18: Birch Narrows Dene Nation membership code ratification vote
- January 20: Municipal by-election in the Rural Municipality of Cana No. 214, Saskatchewan
- January 23:
  - Stikine School District election
  - Municipal by-election in Burns Lake and mayoral by-election in Belcarra, British Columbia
- January 29: Mississaugas of Scugog Island First Nation election code vote
- January 30:
  - Municipal by-election in Fort St. James, British Columbia
  - Nipissing First Nation custom election code ratification vote

== February ==
- February 6:
  - **Nova Scotia Liberal Party leadership election**
  - School District 20 Kootenay-Columbia by-election
- February 10: Sumas First Nation cannabis store permit vote
- February 12: Dokis First Nation Specific Claim Settlement Agreement Vote
- February 13:
  - Municipal by-elections in the Kootenay Boundary Regional District (not held due to acclamation) and Revelstoke, British Columbia
  - Chilliwack School District by-election
- February 17: Chief and council by-election, ʔaq̓am Community Council
- February 22:
  - Tl'etinqox Government election
  - Municipal by-elections in Resort Municipality (acclaimed), Three Rivers, Mount Stewart (council and mayoral; acclaimed), and York, Prince Edward Island (council and mayoral; acclaimed
- February 23: Soda Creek Indian Band by-election
- February 24: Kitsumkalum Band chief and council election
- February 25:
  - K'atlodeeche First Nation by-election
  - Muskowekwan First Nation referendum (proposed amendments to elections act)
- February 26:
  - Binche Whut'en by-election
  - Birch Narrows Dene Nation and Buffalo River Dene Nation settlement agreement votes
- February 27:
  - Municipal by-elections in Telkwa and Campbell River, British Columbia
  - Langley School District by-election
  - Anishinabek Nation Governance Agreement Vote

== March ==
- March 6:
  - Coast Mountains School District by-election
  - Mayoral and council by-elections in Tofino, British Columbia
- March 8:
  - Municipal by-election in St. Peters Bay, Prince Edward Island (acclaimed)
  - North East School Division board by-election
- March 10: Skowkale First Nation election
- March 11: Atikameksheng Anishnawbek lands committee election
- March 12: Wabauskang First Nation general band election
- March 15: Municipal by-election in Belfast and North Wiltshire, Prince Edward Island (both acclaimed)
- March 22: Municipal by-election in Miminegash
- March 25:
  - **Newfoundland and Labrador general election (postponed from February 13)**
  - Saik‘uz First Nation council election
- March 27:
  - Shackan Indian Band chief and council election
  - Nelson, British Columbia council by-election
- March 30:
  - Squiala First Nation council election
  - Okanagan Indian Band general election
- March 31: North Channel Métis Community Council general election (Métis Nation of Ontario)

== April ==
- April 6: Hupacasath First Nation election
- April 10: Squamish Nation referendum
- April 12:
  - **Yukon general election**
  - Municipal by-elections in Central Prince, Northport and Alexandra, Prince Edward Island (mayor and councillor), all acclaimed
- April 15: Esketemc First Nation council election
- April 16: Mississaugas of Scugog Island First Nation Restated Land Code Community Vote
- April 17:
  - **Conservative Party of Quebec leadership election**
  - Masset, British Columbia council by-election
- April 21: Lytton First Nation election
- April 24:
  - Powell River School District by-election
  - Castlegar, British Columbia mayoral and council by-election and Mission, British Columbia mayoral election
- April 28: Frog Lake First Nation election
- April 30: Gitxaala Nation election

== May ==
- May 3:
  - Municipal by-elections in Kinkora, and Kensington, Prince Edward Island
  - Bonaparte First Nation Election
- May 5: Municipal by-elections in Brandon (Ward 5) and Pinawa, Manitoba
- May 8: Gitwangak Indian Band Election
- May 10:
  - **New Brunswick municipal elections**
  - Municipal by-elections in Borden-Carleton, Crapaud and Breadalbane, Prince Edward Island (acclaimed)
  - Municipal by-election in Crossfield, Alberta
- May 11: Soda Creek Council Election
- May 12:
  - Carrot River, Saskatchewan mayoral by-election
  - Roblin, Manitoba municipal by-election (not held due to acclamation)
- May 15:
  - Municipal by-elections in Qualicum Beach and Fort St. John, British Columbia
  - Shawanaga First Nation General Election
- May 17: Municipal by-election in Cornwall, Prince Edward Island
- May 22: Takla Nation General Election
- May 25: Municipal elections in Northwest New Brunswick (postponed from May 10)
- May 26: Nuxalk Nation General Election
- May 29:
  - By-elections in North Vancouver School District and Vernon School District
  - Richmond, British Columbia municipal by-election

== June ==
- June 3: Municipal by-election in Ward 2, Norfolk County, Ontario
- June 5: Municipal by-election in Terrace, British Columbia
- June 7: Haisla Nation Election
- June 9: Municipal by-election in Snow Lake, Manitoba
- June 10: Kitselas First Nation and Sq’ewlets First Nation Elections
- June 16: Municipal by-election in Indian Head, Saskatchewan
- June 17: Nee-Tahi-Buhn Band By-election
- June 19: Municipal by-elections in Penticton and Silverton, British Columbia
- June 21: Municipal by-elections in Souris West and Sherbrooke, Prince Edward Island
- June 22: Lake Babine Nation General Election
- June 23: Municipal by-elections in the Municipality of Killarney-Turtle Mountain and Ste. Anne, Manitoba
- June 26:
  - Mohawk Council of Akwesasne general election
  - Central Okanagan School District by-election
  - Burnaby, British Columbia municipal by-election

== July–September ==
- July 7: Gitsegukla First Nation Chief and Council Election
- July 9: Nipissing First Nation General Election
- July 10: Municipal by-election in Pouce Coupe, British Columbia
- July 17: Municipal by-election in Stewart, British Columbia
- July 24: Samahquam First Nation Chief and Council Election
- July 26: Tla'amin Nation by-election
- July 27: Territorial by-election in Monfwi, Northwest Territories
- July 31: Tobacco Plains Indian Band Council Election
- August 4: Municipal by-election in Ward 3, Rural Municipality of Portage la Prairie, Manitoba
- August 9: Municipal by-election in Welland, Ontario
- August 10: Dzawada'enuxw First Nation General election
- August 13: Prophet River First Nation Chief and Council election
- **August 17: 2021 Nova Scotia general election**
- August 30: Mayoral and councillor by-election in Victoria, Prince Edward Island
- September 4:
  - Zagime Anishinabek General election
  - Zhiibaahaasing First Nation election
- September 8: Simpcw First Nation Chief and Council election
- September 18: Municipal by-elections in Pouce Coupe and Creston, British Columbia
- **September 20: 2021 Canadian federal election**
- September 25: Municipal by-election in Abbotsford, British Columbia
- September 26: Squamish Nation General election
- **September 28: Newfoundland and Labrador municipal elections**

== October ==
- October 2: Hagwilget First Nation Government general election
- October 4: Municipal by-elections in Warren Grove (not held due to acclamation) and Three Rivers, Prince Edward Island
- October 5: Municipal elections in Cottlesville and Summerford, Newfoundland and Labrador (delayed from September 28)
- October 16: Mohawks of the Bay of Quinte Ratification vote
- October 18:
  - Alberta municipal elections, Alberta Senate nominee election, 2021 Alberta equalization payments referendum and 2021 Alberta daylight saving time referendum
  - Municipal by-election in Westport, Ontario
- **October 19: Northwest Territories municipal elections (taxed communities; excluding Yellowknife)**
- **October 21: Yukon municipal elections**
- October 23:
  - 2021 Alberta Party leadership election
  - Little Shuswap Lake Chief Election
- **October 25: Nunavut general election**
- October 28: Mississauga First Nation by-election
- **October 30: 2021 Progressive Conservative Party of Manitoba leadership election**

== November ==
- November 3:
  - Moose Jaw, Saskatchewan mayoral by-election.
  - Rural Municipality of Morris, Manitoba municipal by-election
  - Kativik municipal elections
- November 5: Binche Whut'en council by-election.
- November 6:
  - Colchester County, Nova Scotia District 10 council by-election.
  - Shxwhá:y Village council by-election in Nooksack.
  - Municipal by-election in Granisle, British Columbia
- **November 7: Quebec municipal elections**
- November 8:
  - North Rustico, Prince Edward Island municipal by-election (candidates acclaimed)
  - Municipal by-elections in Beaubassin East, Cambridge-Narrows (mayor), Drummond, Kedgwick (Ward 2), Lamèque, Nigadoo, Petitcodiac, Port Elgin and Saint-Louis de Kent, New Brunswick
- November 15: Provincial by-election in Cornwall-Meadowbank, Prince Edward Island
- November 17: Mayoral by-election in Birch Hills, Saskatchewan
- November 23: K'atlodeeche First Nation Council election
- November 25: Coldwater Indian Band General Election
- November 27: Municipal by-election in Comox, British Columbia
- November 29: Municipal by-election in Tignish, Prince Edward Island
- November 30:
  - Municipal elections in Kippens, Newfoundland and Labrador (delayed from September 28)
  - Skawahlook First Nation Constitution Vote
  - Akisqnuk First Nation Ratification Vote

== December ==
- December 3: Kwakiutl Band Council General Election
- December 4: Municipal by-election in Vernon, British Columbia
- December 10: Namgis First Nation Councillor election
- December 13:
  - Northwest Territories municipal elections (hamlets)
  - Municipal by-election in Division 6, Sturgeon County, Alberta and Division 5, Lethbridge County
