= Cardigan (electoral district) =

Federal electoral district in Prince Edward Island, Canada

Prince Edward Island electoral district
- Interactive map of riding boundaries from the 2025 federal election
- Coordinates: 46.344°N 62.507°W

Federal electoral district
- Legislature: House of Commons
MP
Kent MacDonald
Liberal
- District created: 1966
- First contested: 1968
- Last contested: 2025
- District webpage: profile, map

Demographics
- Population (2021): 39,866
- Electors (2025): 31,871
- Area (km²): 2,658
- Pop. density (per km²): 15
- Census division(s): Kings, Queens
- Census subdivision(s): Stratford, Three Rivers, Belfast, Souris, Eastern Kings, Central Kings, Souris West, Murray River, Alexandra, Murray Harbour

Cardigan is a federal electoral district in Prince Edward Island, Canada, that has been represented in the House of Commons of Canada since 1968.

The electoral district was created in 1966 from parts of the ridings of King's and Queen's, with minor modifications to its boundaries since.

Following the 2022 Canadian federal electoral redistribution, the riding lost all of its territory in North Shore and the North Shore Fire District, plus everything west of Highway 6 between them to Malpeque. These changes came into effect following the calling of the 2025 Canadian federal election.

== Political geography ==
In the 2008 election, every poll except two voted Liberal. The only two polls that didn't, voted Conservative. These two polls were centred in the town of Georgetown, Prince Edward Island.

== Demographics ==
According to the 2021 Canadian census, 2023 representation order

Languages: 90.3% English, 4.2% Mandarin, 1.9% French
Race: 91.6% White, 2.8% Indigenous, 2.5% Chinese, 1.2% South Asian
Religions: 69.6% Christian (37.2% Catholic, 7.5% United Church, 5.8% Presbyterian, 3.2% Baptist, 2.5% Anglican, 13.5% other), 27.7% none
Median income: $39,600 (2020)
Average income: $47,680 (2020)

== Members of parliament ==
This riding has elected the following members of parliament:

Parliament	Years	Member	Party
Cardigan; Riding created from King's and Queen's
28th	1968–1972	Melvin McQuaid	Progressive Conservative
29th	1972–1974	Daniel J. MacDonald	Liberal
30th	1974–1979	Daniel J. MacDonald	Liberal
31st	1979–1980	Wilbur MacDonald	Progressive Conservative
32nd	1980–1980	Daniel J. MacDonald	Liberal
32nd	1981–1984	Bennett Campbell	Liberal
33rd	1984–1988	Pat Binns	Progressive Conservative
34th	1988–1993	Lawrence MacAulay	Liberal
35th	1993–1997	Lawrence MacAulay	Liberal
36th	1997–2000	Lawrence MacAulay	Liberal
37th	2000–2004	Lawrence MacAulay	Liberal
38th	2004–2006	Lawrence MacAulay	Liberal
39th	2006–2008	Lawrence MacAulay	Liberal
40th	2008–2011	Lawrence MacAulay	Liberal
41st	2011–2015	Lawrence MacAulay	Liberal
42nd	2015–2019	Lawrence MacAulay	Liberal
43rd	2019–2021	Lawrence MacAulay	Liberal
44th	2021–2025	Lawrence MacAulay	Liberal
45th	2025–present	Kent MacDonald	Liberal

== Election results ==
=== 2025 ===
2025 Canadian federal election
Party	Candidate	Votes	%	±%	Expenditures
Liberal	Kent MacDonald	14,404	57.02	+6.45	
Conservative	James Aylward	9,442	37.38	+6.47	
New Democratic	Lynne Thiele	505	2.00	−7.77	
Independent	Wayne Phelan	404	1.60		
Green	Maria Rodriguez	326	1.29	−3.52	
People's	Adam Harding	180	0.71	−2.57	
Total valid votes/expense limit		25,261	99.09		
Total rejected ballots		233	0.91		
Turnout		25,494	79.55		
Eligible voters		32,048			
Liberal notional hold		Swing		−0.01	
Source: Elections Canada
Note: number of eligible voters does not include voting day registrations.

=== 2021 ===
2021 federal election redistributed results
Party	Vote	%
Liberal	10,955	50.56
Conservative	6,697	30.91
New Democratic	2,117	9.77
Green	1,042	4.81
People's	711	3.28
Others	143	0.66

2021 Canadian federal election
Party	Candidate	Votes	%	±%	Expenditures
Liberal	Lawrence MacAulay	11,175	50.58	+1.23	$47,596.44
Conservative	Wayne Phelan	6,817	30.85	+1.81	$38,354.38
New Democratic	Lynne Thiele	2,168	9.81	+3.13	$3,739.79
Green	Michael MacLean	1,064	4.82	-9.02	$5,906.70
People's	Kevin Hardy	725	3.28	–	$1,431.55
Christian Heritage	Fred MacLeod	145	0.66	-0.43	$627.12
Total valid votes/expense limit		21,994	99.11	–	$90,511.54
Total rejected ballots		199	0.89	-0.14	
Turnout		22,293	72.28	-2.71	
Eligible voters		30,843			
Liberal hold		Swing		-0.29	
Source: Elections Canada

=== 2019 ===
2019 Canadian federal election
Party	Candidate	Votes	%	±%	Expenditures
Liberal	Lawrence MacAulay	10,939	49.35	−15.68	$42,720.95
Conservative	Wayne Phelan	6,439	29.05	+12.89	none listed
Green	Glen Beaton	3,068	13.84	+7.46	$13,490.35
New Democratic	Lynne Thiele	1,481	6.68	−4.45	$0.00
Christian Heritage	Christene Squires	240	1.08	−0.23	$278.30
Total valid votes/expense limit		22,167	98.96		$85,990.53
Total rejected ballots		232	1.04	+0.61	
Turnout		22,399	74.99	−3.17	
Eligible voters		29,869			
Liberal hold		Swing		−14.29	
Source: Elections Canada

=== 2015 ===
2015 Canadian federal election
Party	Candidate	Votes	%	±%	Expenditures
Liberal	Lawrence MacAulay	14,621	65.03	+15.40	$57,014.46
Conservative	Julius Patkai	3,632	16.15	–22.22	$36,428.35
New Democratic	Billy Cann	2,503	11.13	+0.84	$13,760.96
Green	Teresa Doyle	1,434	6.38	+4.61	$7,232.74
Christian Heritage	Christene Squires	295	1.31	–	$2,681.69
Total valid votes/expense limit		22,485	99.57		$170,761.91
Total rejected ballots		96	0.43	–0.08	
Turnout		22,581	78.16	-0.13	
Eligible voters		28,889			
Liberal hold		Swing		+18.81	
Source: Elections Canada

=== 2011 ===
2011 Canadian federal election
Party	Candidate	Votes	%	±%	Expenditures
Liberal	Lawrence MacAulay	10,486	49.63	-3.18	$40,566.83
Conservative	Michael Currie	8,107	38.37	+8.48	$60,502.86
New Democratic	Lorne Cudmore	2,164	10.24	+2.11	$1,837.23
Green	Leslie Stewart	373	1.77	-1.96	$1,714.72
Total valid votes/expense limit		21,130	100.0	–	$69,835.73
Total rejected, unmarked and declined ballots		108	0.51	-0.02	
Turnout		21,238	78.29	+8.03	
Eligible voters		27,127			
Liberal hold		Swing		-5.83	

=== 2008 ===
2008 Canadian federal election
Party	Candidate	Votes	%	±%	Expenditures
Liberal	Lawrence MacAulay	10,105	52.81	-3.35	$35,000.12
Conservative	Sid McMullin	5,661	29.59	-4.09	$29,907.51
New Democratic	Mike Avery	1,556	8.13	+0.66	$1,316.84
Independent	Larry McGuire	1,101	5.75	–	none listed
Green	Emma Daughton	710	3.71	+1.02	$2,546.13
Total valid votes/expense limit		19,133	100.0	–	$67,487
Total rejected, unmarked and declined ballots		101	0.53	-0.03	
Turnout		19,234	70.26	-5.07	
Eligible voters		27,374			
Liberal hold		Swing		+0.37	

=== 2006 ===
2006 Canadian federal election
Party	Candidate	Votes	%	±%	Expenditures
Liberal	Lawrence MacAulay	11,542	56.16	+2.78	$38,353.41
Conservative	Don Gillis	6,923	33.68	+0.44	$62,756.67
New Democratic	Edith Perry	1,535	7.47	-2.68	$1,532.80
Green	Haida Arsenault-Antolick	553	2.69	-0.54	$679.02
Total valid votes/expense limit		20,533	100.0	–	$63,115
Total rejected, unmarked and declined ballots		116	0.56		
Turnout		20,649	75.33		
Eligible voters		27,411			
Liberal hold		Swing		+1.17	

=== 2004 ===
2004 Canadian federal election
Party	Candidate	Votes	%	±%	Expenditures
Liberal	Lawrence MacAulay	11,064	53.38	+6.56	$54,157.07
Conservative	Peter McQuaid	6,889	33.24	-14.78	$59,824.10
New Democratic	Dave MacKinnon	2,103	10.15	+5.09	$20,929.08
Green	Jeremy Stiles	670	3.23	–	$1,315.34
Total valid votes/expense limit		20,726	100.0	–	$61,091
Total rejected, unmarked and declined ballots		137	0.66		
Turnout		20,863	76.2		
Eligible voters		27,656			
Liberal notional hold		Swing		+10.67	
Changes from 2000 are based on redistributed results. Change for the Conservatives is based on the combined totals of the Progressive Conservatives and the Canadian Alliance.

2000 federal election redistributed results
Party	Vote	%
Liberal	9,132	46.85
Progressive Conservative	8,765	44.96
New Democratic	987	5.06
Alliance	596	3.06
Others	14	0.07

=== 2000 ===
2000 Canadian federal election
Party	Candidate	Votes	%	±%
Liberal	Lawrence MacAulay	8,545	48.06	+3.01
Progressive Conservative	Kevin MacAdam	8,269	46.51	+2.05
Alliance	Darrell Hickox	500	2.81	
New Democratic	Deborah Kelly Hawkes	465	2.62	-7.88
Total valid votes		17,779	100.00	

=== 1997 ===
1997 Canadian federal election
Party	Candidate	Votes	%	±%
Liberal	Lawrence MacAulay	7,555	45.05	-16.59
Progressive Conservative	Dan Hughes	7,456	44.46	+11.79
New Democratic	Larry Duchesne	1,761	10.50	+4.81
Total valid votes		16,772	100.00	

=== 1993 ===
1993 Canadian federal election
Party	Candidate	Votes	%	±%
Liberal	Lawrence MacAulay	10,115	61.64	+10.02
Progressive Conservative	Wilbur MacDonald	5,360	32.67	-11.26
New Democratic	Reg Phelan	934	5.69	+1.23
Total valid votes		16,409	100.00	

=== 1988 ===
1988 Canadian federal election
Party	Candidate	Votes	%	±%
Liberal	Lawrence MacAulay	9,325	51.62	+9.48
Progressive Conservative	Pat Binns	7,936	43.93	-9.43
New Democratic	Gertrude Partridge	805	4.46	-0.04
Total valid votes		18,066	100.00	

=== 1984 ===
1984 Canadian federal election
Party	Candidate	Votes	%	±%
Progressive Conservative	Pat Binns	10,566	53.36	+6.44
Liberal	Bennett Campbell	8,344	42.14	-6.90
New Democratic	Lorne Cudmore	891	4.50	+0.45
Total valid votes		19,801	100.00	

=== 1981 by-election ===
Canadian federal by-election, 13 April 1981 On the death of Daniel J. MacDonald, 30 September 1980
Party	Candidate	Votes	%	±%
Liberal	Bennett Campbell	8,166	49.04	+0.86
Progressive Conservative	Wilbur MacDonald	7,813	46.92	+2.02
New Democratic	Aubrey Cantello	674	4.05	-1.86
Total valid votes		16,653	100.00	

=== 1980 ===
1980 Canadian federal election
Party	Candidate	Votes	%	±%
Liberal	Daniel J. MacDonald	8,590	48.18	+1.51
Progressive Conservative	Wilbur MacDonald	8,006	44.90	-3.21
New Democratic	Aubrey Cantelo	1,054	5.91	+0.69
Independent	Arthur D. Reddin	180	1.01	
Total valid votes		17,830	100.00	

=== 1979 ===
1979 Canadian federal election
Party	Candidate	Votes	%	±%
Progressive Conservative	Wilbur MacDonald	8,219	48.11	+5.98
Liberal	Daniel J. MacDonald	7,972	46.67	-7.32
New Democratic	George MacFarlane	892	5.22	+1.94
Total valid votes		17,083	100.00	

=== 1974 ===
1974 Canadian federal election
Party	Candidate	Votes	%	±%
Liberal	Daniel J. MacDonald	6,958	53.99	+9.45
Progressive Conservative	Leo James Walsh	5,429	42.13	+0.95
New Democratic	Martin Gerard Kenny	423	3.28	-10.99
Independent	A. Neil Harpham	77	0.60	
Total valid votes		12,887	100.00	

=== 1972 ===
1972 Canadian federal election
Party	Candidate	Votes	%	±%
Liberal	Daniel J. MacDonald	5,528	44.54	-4.21
Progressive Conservative	Alfred Kenneth Fraser	5,111	41.18	-8.35
New Democratic	Aquinas Ryan	1,771	14.27	+12.51
Total valid votes		12,410	100.00	

=== 1968 ===
1968 Canadian federal election
Party	Candidate	Votes	%
Progressive Conservative	Melvin McQuaid	5,717	49.53
Liberal	John Mullally	5,623	48.75
New Democratic	Spurgeon Joseph Hazelden	203	1.76
Total valid votes		11,543	100.00

== Student vote results ==
=== 2011 election ===
In 2011, a student vote was conducted at participating Canadian schools to parallel the 2011 Canadian federal election results. The vote was designed to educate students and simulate the electoral process for persons who have not yet reached the legal majority. Schools with a large student body that reside in another electoral district had the option to vote for candidates outside of the electoral district where they were physically located.

2011 Canadian federal election
Party	Candidate	Votes	%
Liberal	Lawrence MacAulay	456	35.82
Conservative	Michael Currie	352	27.65
New Democratic	Lorne Cudmore	244	19.17
Green	Leslie Stewart	221	17.36
Total valid votes/expense limit		1,273	100.00

== See also ==
- List of Canadian electoral districts
- Historical federal electoral districts of Canada
