= Green Bay, Prince Edward Island =

Green Bay
- Settlement
- Location of Green Bay in Prince Edward Island
- Coordinates: 46.25407°N 63.35970°W
- Country: Canada
- Province: Prince Edward Island
- County: Queens County
- Municipality: Lot 30
- Community: Kingston
- Named: December 12, 1939
- Joined Kingston: 1974
- Time zone: UTC-04:00 (AST)
  - Summer (DST): UTC-03:00 (ADT)
- Postal code span: C0A
- Area codes: 902, 782

Green Bay is a locality in the community of Kingston, Prince Edward Island. Green Bay falls inside the subdivision of Lot 30.

The settlement of Green Bay was named on December 12, 1939. Green Bay was changed to a locality when it became a part of the community of Kingston in 1974.
