= Winsloe South =

- Winsloe South in Prince Edward Island
- Coordinates: 46.325°N 63.188°W
- Country: Canada
- Province: Prince Edward Island
- County: Queens County
- Incorporated: 1986
- Amalgamated: December 15, 2017

Population (2011)
  - Total: 221
- Time zone: AST
  - Summer (DST): ADT
- Area code: 902
- Telephone Exchange: 887

Winsloe South is a former municipality in Prince Edward Island, Canada that held community status between 1986 and 2017. It amalgamated with Brackley on December 15, 2017.

Federal census population history of Winsloe South
Year	Pop.	±%
1986	161	—
1991	197	+22.4%
1996	207	+5.1%
2001	240	+15.9%
2006	198	−17.5%
2011	221	+11.6%
2016	224	+1.4%
2021	252	+12.5%
Source: Statistics Canada

== See also ==
- List of communities in Prince Edward Island
