= List of towns in Prince Edward Island =

A town is an incorporated municipality in the Canadian province of Prince Edward Island.

Prince Edward Island has ten towns, which had a cumulative population of 32,632 and an average population of 3,263 in the 2021 Census. The province's largest and smallest towns are Stratford and North Rustico with populations of 10,927 and 648 respectively. The province's newest town is Three Rivers, which was incorporated on September 28, 2018.

== Governance ==
Pursuant to Prince Edward Island's Municipal Government Act (MGA), each town elects a mayor and six councillors, unless an increase is enacted by municipal bylaw. For the 2018–2022 term, nine of the ten towns have a council of seven, while Three Rivers has a council of thirteen, which results in a total of 92 elected officials governing towns in Prince Edward Island. The last municipal election was November 5, 2018. The next is scheduled for November 7, 2022.

== List ==
List of towns in Prince Edward Island
Name	County	Incorporation year	Council size	2021 Census of Population				
Name	County	Incorporation year	Council size	Population (2021)	Population (2016)	Change	Land area (km^{2})	Population density (ppl/km²)
Alberton	Prince	1913	7	1,301	1,145	+13.6%	4.70	276.8
Borden-Carleton	Prince	1995 (Note: Borden-Carlton, which previously held community status, incorporated as a town on July 31, 2012.)	7	788	724	+8.8%	12.94	60.9
Cornwall	Queens	1995	7	6,574	5,348	+22.9%	28.21	233.0
Kensington	Prince	1914	7	1,812	1,619	+11.9%	3.17	571.6
North Rustico	Queens	1954 (Note: North Rustico, which previously held community status, incorporated as a town on November 16, 2013.)	7	648	617	+5.0%	2.64	245.5
O'Leary	Prince	1951 (Note: O'Leary, which previously held community status, incorporated as a town on March 11, 2014.)	7	876	815	+7.5%	1.83	478.7
Souris	Kings	1910	7	1,079	1,053	+2.5%	3.61	298.9
Stratford	Queens	1995	7	10,927	9,711	+12.5%	22.67	482.0
Three Rivers	Kings	2018	9	7,883	7,169	+10.0%	431.47	16.6
Tignish	Prince	1952 (Note: Tignish, which previously held community status, incorporated as a town on April 1, 2017.)	7	744	719	+3.5%	5.87	126.7
Total towns	–	–	72	32,632	28,920	+12.8%	517.11	63.1

== Former towns ==
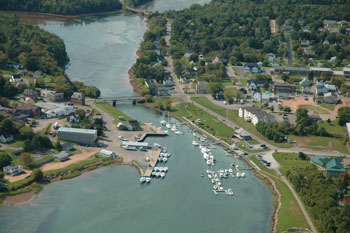
Aerial view of Montague

Former towns in Prince Edward Island include:

- Borden, which was part of the amalgamation that created Borden-Carleton on April 12, 1995;
- Georgetown, which was part of the amalgamation that formed the Town of Three Rivers on September 28, 2018;
- Montague, which was also part of the amalgamation that formed the Town of Three Rivers on September 28, 2018; and
- Parkdale, which amalgamated with the City of Charlottetown on April 1, 1995.

== See also ==
- List of municipalities in Prince Edward Island
