= Union Road =

Human settlement in Prince Edward Island, Canada

- Rural municipality
- Union Road in Prince Edward Island
- Coordinates: 46°19′52.1″N 63°8′5.3″W
- Country: Canada
- Province: Prince Edward Island
- County: Queens County
- Lot: 33

Population (2016)
  - Total: 204
- Time zone: AST
  - Summer (DST): ADT
- Area code: 902

Union Road is a rural municipality in Prince Edward Island, Canada. It is located in Queens County.

Located in the township of Lot 33, Union Road is one of several communities comprising a green belt surrounding the City of Charlottetown.

== Demographics ==
Federal census population history of Union Road
Year	Pop.	±%
1981	166	—
1986	187	+12.7%
1991	197	+5.3%
1996	218	+10.7%
2001	225	+3.2%
2006	245	+8.9%
2011	235	−4.1%
2016	204	−13.2%
2021	213	+4.4%
Source: Statistics Canada

In the 2021 Census of Population conducted by Statistics Canada, Union Road had a population of 213 living in 78 of its 82 total private dwellings, a change of 4.4% from its 2016 population of 204. With a land area of 10.33 km^{2} (3.99 sq mi), it had a population density of 20.6/km^{2} (53.4/sq mi) in 2021.
