= List of municipalities in Prince Edward Island =

A map of Canada, showing Prince Edward Island in red.

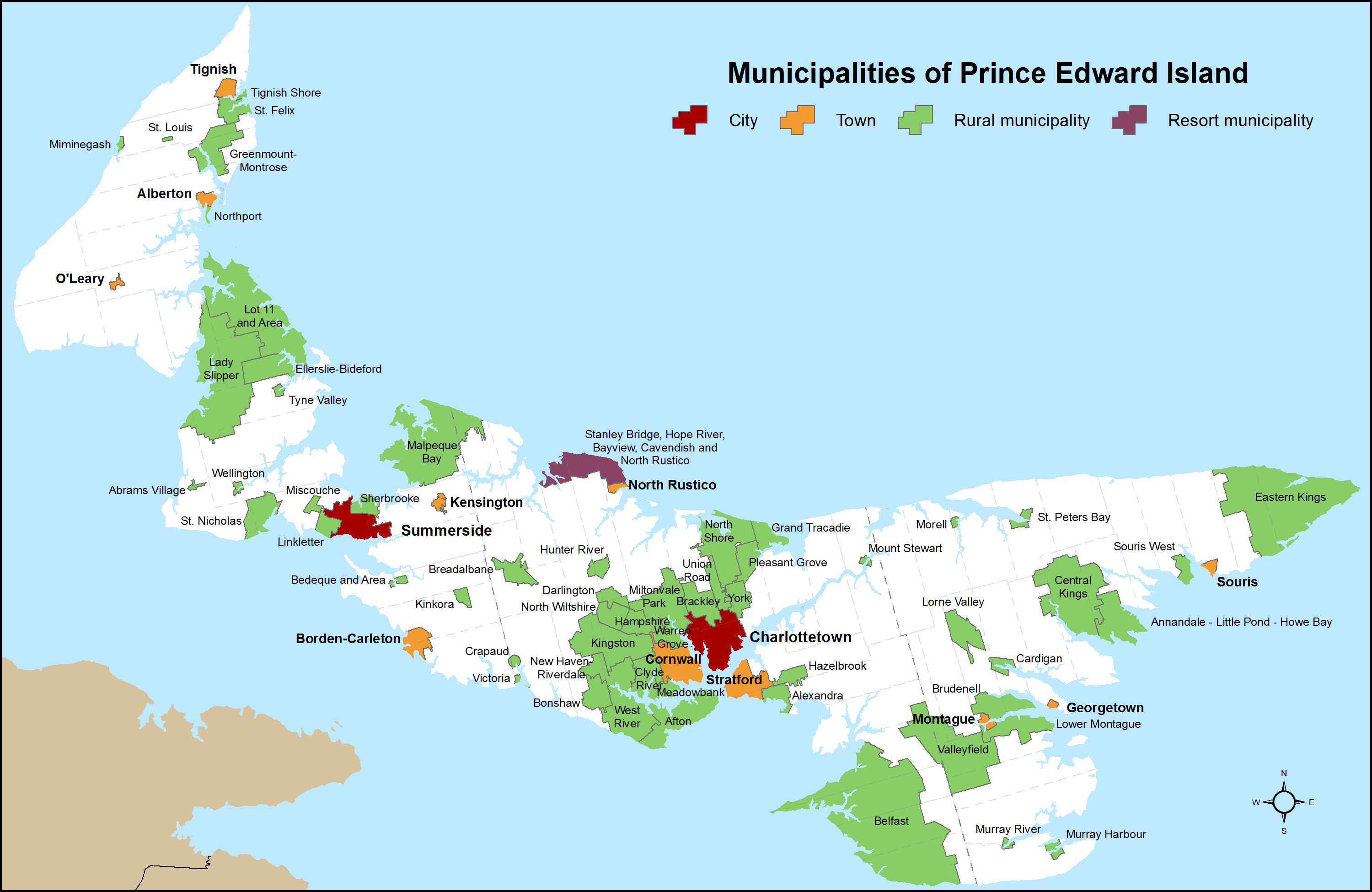
Distribution of Prince Edward Island's 72 municipalities by municipal status type as of 2017

Prince Edward Island is the least populous province in Canada with 154,331 residents as of the 2021 census and is the smallest in land area at 5,681.18 km^{2} (2,193.52 mi^{2}). Prince Edward Island's 63 municipalities cover 34.7% of the province's land mass and were home to 73% of its population in 2021. (Note: The remaining 27% of Prince Edward Island's population resides in unincorporated areas or on Indian reserves.) These municipalities provide local government services to their residents in the form of fire protection, municipal planning services, and emergency measures planning. The remaining unincorporated areas have no local government.

Municipal statuses in Prince Edward Island are cities, towns, rural municipalities, and resort municipalities. Under Prince Edward Island's Municipal Government Act (MGA), which came into force on December 23, 2017, the formation of a municipality can be proposed by the Minister of Fisheries and Communities, the council of an existing municipality, or a petition signed by 30% of the residents that would be the electors of the new municipality. To be eligible for city or town status, certain minimum estimated population and total property assessment value criteria must be met. If those criteria are not met, rural municipality status can be granted if it is the opinion of the Minister of Fisheries and Communities that it would be in the public interest. The province's lone resort municipality – the Resort Municipality of Stanley Bridge, Hope River, Bayview, Cavendish and North Rustico – was established by order in council in 1990. The 2017 MGA prevents creation of any new resort municipalities.

Prince Edward Island has two cities, ten towns, fifty rural municipalities and one resort municipality, which are distributed across three counties – Kings, Prince and Queens. Charlottetown is Prince Edward Island's capital and largest municipality by population while Belfast is the largest municipality by land area. The smallest municipalities by population and land area are Tignish Shore and St. Louis respectively.

== Cities ==
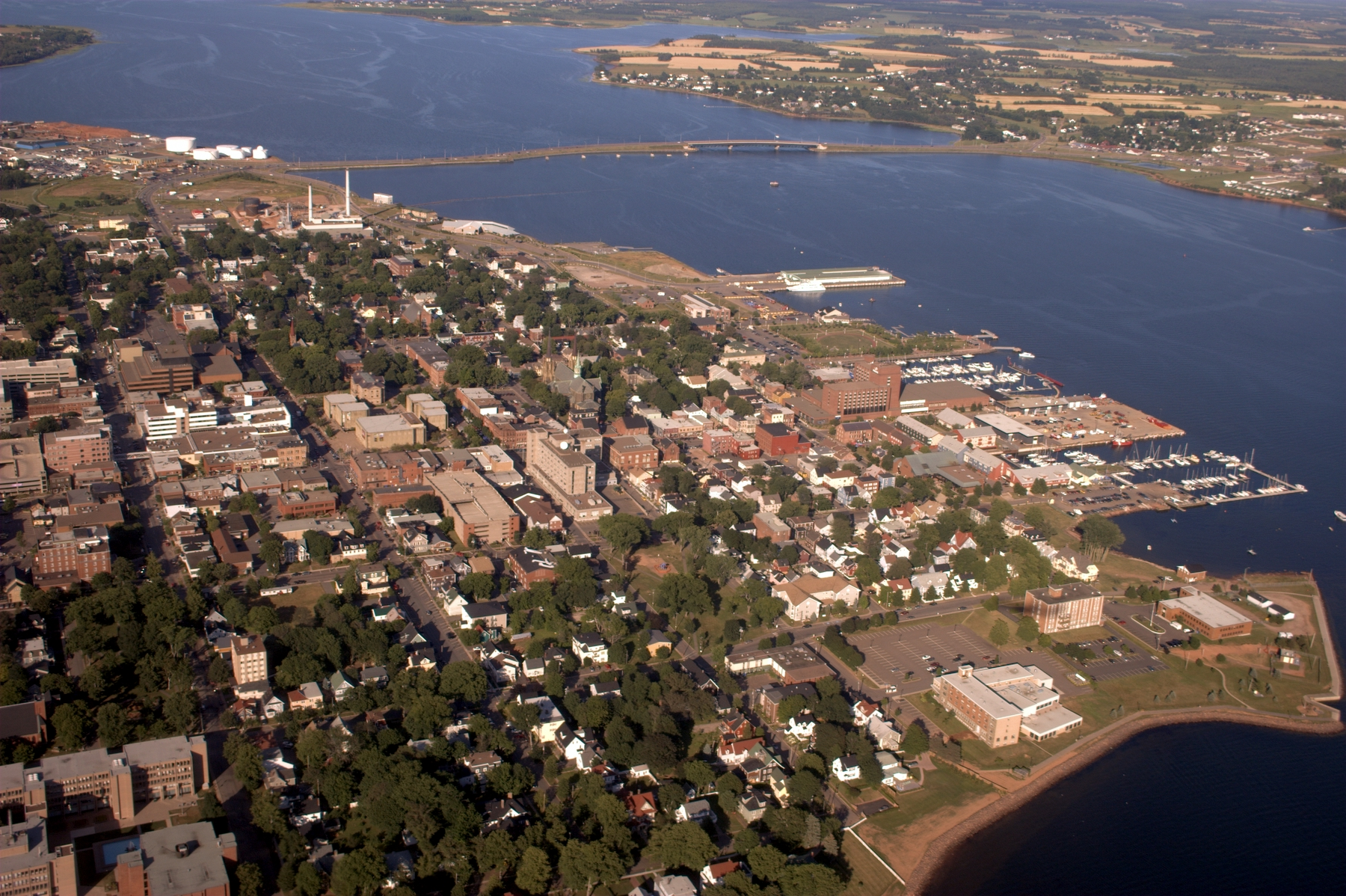
Aerial view of Charlottetown, Prince Edward Island's capital and largest city

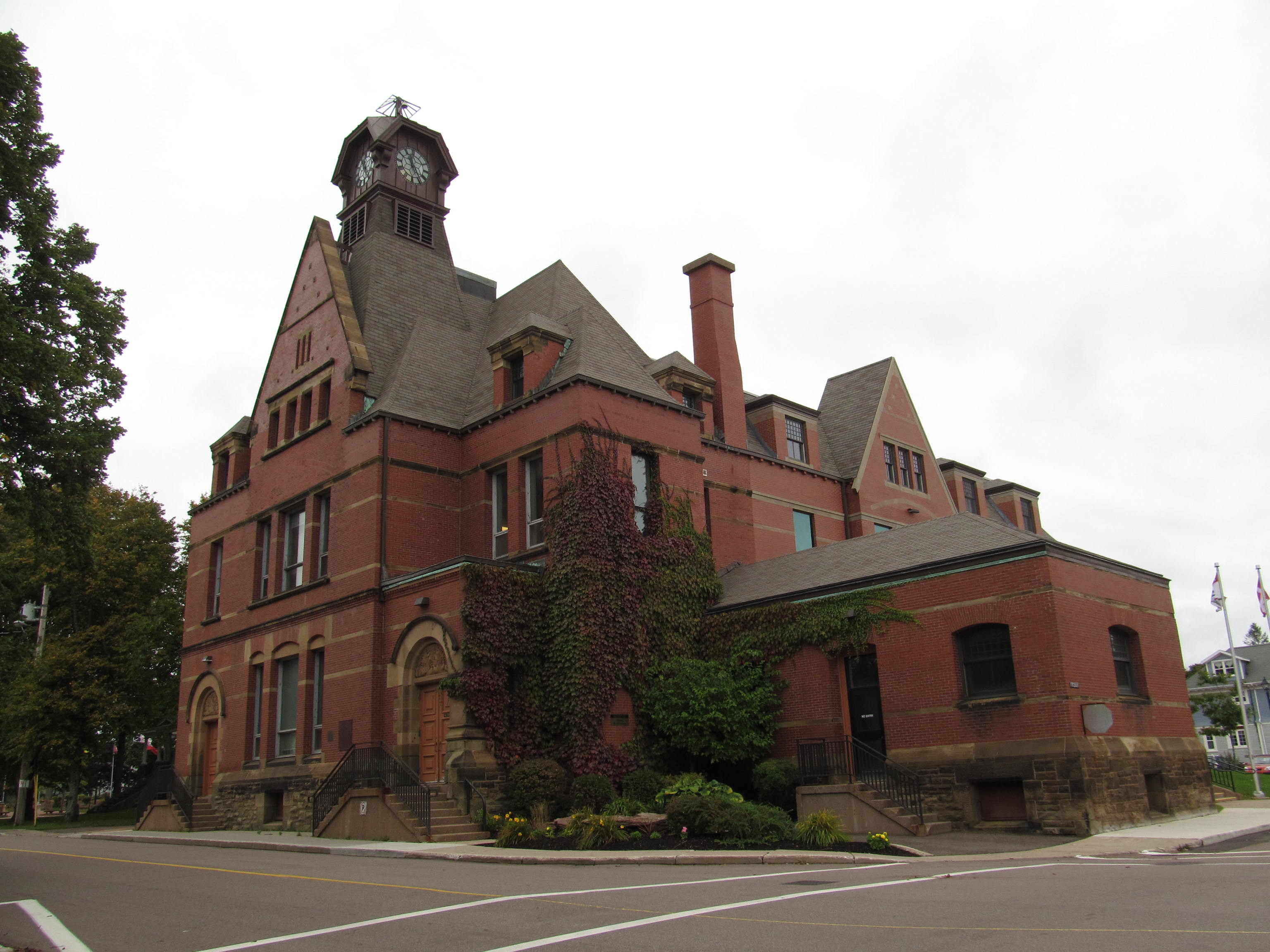
Summerside, Prince Edward Island's second largest municipality and only other city

Under the province's MGA, a municipality may incorporate as a city if it has an estimated population of 15,000 or more and a total property assessment value of $750 million or more. Should a city no longer meet these requirements, the Minister of Fisheries and Communities may recommend to the Lieutenant Governor in Council to change the status of the municipality to a more appropriate status.

Prince Edward Island has two cities. Charlottetown is Prince Edward Island's capital and largest city both by population with 38,809 residents and by land area with 44.27 km^{2} (17.09 mi^{2}). It forms the core of a census agglomeration that encompasses the middle of the island and is home to 78,858 residents, or 51% of the island's population. The province's second city is Summerside, which is located on the west side of the island. It has a population of 16,001 and a land area of 28.21 km^{2} (10.89 mi^{2}). Starting with the municipal elections in 2018, the MGA enables cities to elect a mayor and a minimum of eight councillors. With general municipal elections occurring every four years, the next municipal election is scheduled for November 2nd 2026.

== Towns ==
Under the province's MGA, a municipality may incorporate as a town if has an estimated population of 4,000 or more but is less than 15,000, and a total property assessment value of $200 million or more, but is less than $750 million. Should a town no longer meet these requirements, the Minister of Fisheries and Communities may recommend to the Lieutenant Governor in Council to change the status of the municipality to a more appropriate status.

Prince Edward Island has ten towns that are incorporated municipalities, which had a cumulative population of 32,632 in the 2021 census. The province's largest and smallest towns are Stratford and North Rustico with populations of 10,927 and 648 respectively. Three Rivers is Prince Edward Island's largest town by land area with 431.47 km^{2} (166.59 mi^{2}) and O'Leary is the province's smallest town by land area with 1.83 km^{2} (0.71 mi^{2}). Three Rivers is also the province's newest town, which incorporated as a town on September 28, 2018, through the amalgamation of the towns of Georgetown and Montague, five rural municipalities (Brudenell, Cardigan, Lorne Valley, Lower Montague, and Valleyfield), and portions of three adjacent unincorporated areas. Starting with the municipal elections in 2018, the MGA enables towns to elect a mayor and a minimum of six councillors. With general municipal elections occurring every four years, the next municipal election is scheduled for November 2nd 2026.

== Rural municipalities ==
Under the province's MGA, municipalities that previously held community status under the previous Municipalities Act, which originally came into force in 1983, were carried forward as rural municipalities. (Note: Prior to the Municipalities Act, incorporated communities were previously designated either villages or community improvement committees.) With the amalgamation of Brackley and Winsloe South on December 15, 2017, and then the MGA coming into force eight days later on December 23, 2017, Prince Edward Island had 58 communities that became rural municipalities. On September 28, 2018, three amalgamations reduced the total amount of rural municipalities to 50. As of the 2021 census, the province's largest and smallest rural municipalities are West River and Tignish Shore with populations of 3,473 and 64 respectively. Starting with the municipal elections in 2018, the MGA enables rural municipalities to elect a mayor and a minimum of six councillors. With general municipal elections occurring every four years, the next municipal election is scheduled for November 2nd 2026.

== Resort municipalities ==
Prince Edward Island has one municipality holding resort municipality status. The Resort Municipality of Stanley Bridge, Hope River, Bayview, Cavendish and North Rustico was established as a resort municipality in 1990. The province's MGA allows this resort municipality to continue yet prevents the establishment of additional resort municipalities in the future. Starting with the municipal elections in 2018, the MGA enables the province's lone resort municipality to elect a mayor and a minimum of six councillors. With general municipal elections occurring every four years, the next municipal election is scheduled for August 2026. If the population of the lone resort municipality reaches 2,000 electors, it may be incorporated as a different type of municipality pursuant to the MGA.

== List of municipalities ==
List of municipalities in Prince Edward Island
Name	Municipal status	County	Incorporation year	2021 Census of Population				
Name	Municipal status	County	Incorporation year	Population (2021)	Population (2016)	Change	Land area (km^{2})	Population density (/km^{2})
Charlottetown	City	Queens	1855	38,809	36,094	+7.5%	44.27	876.6
Summerside	City	Prince	1877 (Note: Summerside incorporated as a city on April 1, 1995 upon amalgamating with the incorporated communities of St. Eleanors and Wilmot.)	16,001	14,839	+7.8%	28.21	567.2
Alberton	Town	Prince	1913	1,301	1,145	+13.6%	4.70	276.8
Borden-Carleton	Town	Prince	1995 (Note: Borden-Carlton, which previously held community status, incorporated as a town on July 31, 2012.)	788	724	+8.8%	12.94	60.9
Cornwall	Town	Queens	1995	6,574	5,348	+22.9%	28.21	233.0
Kensington	Town	Prince	1914	1,812	1,619	+11.9%	3.17	571.6
North Rustico	Town	Queens	1954 (Note: North Rustico, which previously held community status, incorporated as a town on November 16, 2013.)	648	617	+5.0%	2.64	245.5
O'Leary	Town	Prince	1951 (Note: O'Leary, which previously held community status, incorporated as a town on March 11, 2014.)	876	815	+7.5%	1.83	478.7
Souris	Town	Kings	1910	1,079	1,053	+2.5%	3.61	298.9
Stratford	Town	Queens	1995	10,927	9,711	+12.5%	22.67	482.0
Three Rivers	Town	Kings	2018	7,883	7,169	+10.0%	431.47	18.3
Tignish	Town	Prince	1952	744	719	+3.5%	5.87	126.7
Abram-Village	Rural municipality	Prince	1974	340	300	+13.3%	1.36	250.0
Alexandra	Rural municipality	Queens	1972	252	204	+23.5%	10.35	24.3
Annandale-Little Pond-Howe Bay	Rural municipality	Kings	1975	223	207	+7.7%	31.87	7.0
Bedeque and Area	Rural municipality	Prince	2014	311	302	+3.0%	2.26	137.6
Belfast	Rural municipality	Queens	1972	1,687	1,636	+3.1%	229.27	7.4
Brackley	Rural municipality	Queens	1983 (Note: Brackley amalgamated with Winsloe South on December 15, 2017. Winsloe South originally incorporated in 1986.)	586	596	−1.7%	18.75	31.3
Breadalbane	Rural municipality	Queens	1991	170	167	+1.8%	12.67	13.4
Central Kings	Rural municipality	Kings	1975	386	349	+10.6%	72.94	5.3
Central Prince	Rural municipality	Prince	2018	1,129	1,054	+7.1%	133.78	8.4
Clyde River	Rural municipality	Queens	1974	614	653	−6.0%	15.93	38.5
Crapaud	Rural municipality	Queens	1950	361	319	+13.2%	2.10	171.9
Darlington	Rural municipality	Queens	1983	99	90	+10.0%	7.72	12.8
Eastern Kings	Rural municipality	Kings	1974	687	698	−1.6%	141.12	4.9
Greenmount-Montrose	Rural municipality	Prince	1977	262	292	−10.3%	26.03	10.1
Hampshire	Rural municipality	Queens	1974	339	359	−5.6%	13.52	25.1
Hazelbrook	Rural municipality	Queens	1974	220	193	+14.0%	8.09	27.2
Hunter River	Rural municipality	Queens	1974	390	356	+9.6%	6.04	64.6
Kingston	Rural municipality	Queens	1974	1,111	1,047	+6.1%	48.38	23.0
Kinkora	Rural municipality	Prince	1955	388	336	+15.5%	3.97	97.7
Linkletter	Rural municipality	Prince	1972	315	300	+5.0%	7.88	40.0
Lot 11 and Area	Rural municipality	Prince	1982	617	639	−3.4%	102.61	6.0
Malpeque Bay	Rural municipality	Queens	1973	1,191	1,030	+15.6%	98.97	12.0
Miltonvale Park	Rural municipality	Queens	1974	1,196	1,158	+3.3%	35.13	34.0
Miminegash	Rural municipality	Prince	1968	148	148	0.0%	1.88	78.7
Miscouche	Rural municipality	Prince	1957	992	873	+13.6%	3.49	284.2
Morell	Rural municipality	Kings	1953	269	297	−9.4%	1.49	180.5
Mount Stewart	Rural municipality	Queens	1953	226	209	+8.1%	1.52	148.7
Murray Harbour	Rural municipality	Kings	1953	282	258	+9.3%	3.90	72.3
Murray River	Rural municipality	Kings	1955	337	304	+10.9%	1.54	218.8
North Shore	Rural municipality	Queens	2018	2,500	2,152	+16.2%	71.13	35.1
North Wiltshire	Rural municipality	Queens	1974	176	202	−12.9%	12.43	14.2
Northport	Rural municipality	Prince	1974	157	186	−15.6%	1.73	90.8
Sherbrooke	Rural municipality	Prince	1972	178	159	+11.9%	8.94	19.9
Souris West	Rural municipality	Kings	1972	379	361	+5.0%	7.73	49.0
St. Felix	Rural municipality	Prince	1977	314	325	−3.4%	11.54	27.2
St. Louis	Rural municipality	Prince	1964	69	66	+4.5%	0.68	101.5
St. Nicholas	Rural municipality	Prince	1991	218	213	+2.3%	20.73	10.5
St. Peters Bay	Rural municipality	Kings	1953	231	237	−2.5%	4.44	52.0
Tignish Shore	Rural municipality	Prince	1975	64	63	+1.6%	1.65	38.8
Tyne Valley	Rural municipality	Prince	1966	229	249	−8.0%	1.94	118.0
Union Road	Rural municipality	Queens	1977	213	204	+4.4%	10.33	20.6
Victoria	Rural municipality	Queens	1951	139	74	+87.8%	1.44	96.5
Warren Grove	Rural municipality	Queens	1985	374	346	+8.1%	10.16	36.8
Wellington	Rural municipality	Prince	1959	414	415	−0.2%	1.70	243.5
West River	Rural municipality	Queens	1974	3,473	3,110	+11.7%	121.62	28.6
York	Rural municipality	Queens	1986	387	414	−6.5%	12.27	31.5
Stanley Bridge, Hope River, Bayview, Cavendish and North Rustico (Note: Official legal name is the Resort Municipality of Stanley Bridge, Hope River, Bayview, Cavendish and North Rustico.)	Resort municipality	Queens	1990	359	318	+12.9%	36.10	9.9
Sub-total cities				54,810	50,933	+7.6%	72.48	756.2
Sub-total towns				32,632	28,920	+12.8%	517.11	63.1
Sub-total rural municipalities				24,643	23,150	+6.4%	1,345.02	18.3
Sub-total resort municipalities				359	318	+12.9%	36.10	9.9
Total municipalities				112,444	103,321	+8.8%	1,970.71	57.1
Province of Prince Edward Island				154,331	142,907	+8.0%	5,681.18	27.2

== See also ==
- History of Prince Edward Island
- List of census agglomerations in Atlantic Canada
- List of population centres in Prince Edward Island
