= Hilda Woolnough =

English multimedia artist

- Born: Hilda Mary Woolnough; 11 February 1934; Northampton, England
- Died: 12 December 2007 (aged 76); Charlottetown, Prince Edward Island, Canada
- Known for: Multimedia artist, activist, teacher
- Notable work: "Guantánamo", "Timepiece"
- Spouse(s): Dennis Hopkins; Reshard Gool (d. 1989)

Hilda Mary Woolnough RCA (11 February 1934 – 12 December 2007) was an artist with a wide range of media (drawing, printmaking, painting, sculpture) as well as a teacher, who exhibited her work worldwide. She lived in the artistic community of Breadalbane, Prince Edward Island, Canada. Woolnough was an art activist and supported art institutions and young artists on P.E.I.

== Early life ==
Woolnough was born in Northampton, England in 1934, to a family with a long history of painters, including her mother, uncle and brother. Beginning traditional training at the Chelsea School of Art in London in 1952, and studying amongst a group of renowned artists, among them Ceri Richards and Henry Moore, she experimented with printmaking and graduated with her focus on painting in 1955. She married psychiatrist Dennis Hopkins and together they had three children, Daniel, Lee, and John. Emigrating to Canada in 1957, she settled in Hamilton, Ontario, but left in 1965 to go to San Miguel de Allende Instituto in Mexico to study experimental etching, graduating in 1967 with a focus in graphics and a Masters in Fine Arts. Returning to London, she enrolled in the Central School of Art and Design, where she did post-graduate technical art metal work.

== Career ==
In 1966–1967, Woolnough established an etching and lithography program at the Jamaica School of Art in Kingston, Jamaica. By this time, she had remarried Reshard Gool, a Canadian who founded a publication company known as Square Deal and wrote a best-selling novel, Cape Town Coolie. In 1969, Woolnough and Gool bought a home in Charlottetown, Prince Edward Island, and taught at the University of Prince Edward Island, while forming an art society and starting their own newspaper that failed only after a pro-radical Quebec separationist appearance in the paper created controversy. During the 1970s, Woolnough worked with native quilting, during the Native American craft revival. In 1972, she created her "Power Totem" series, then came her "Beach" series, and then later the "Wave/Rock" series, and her "Chrysalis" series. In 1975, came her "Ring Around the Rosy", a series of collographs, and later in the 1970s, she created the "Winter Squares" series.

In 1977, Woolnough moved to Breadalbane, Prince Edward Island, a village north west of Charlottetown. She created her "Venus" series in 1978, and continued to explore the theme of women in the 1980s. In 1986, Woolnough created "Fishtales; A Marine Mythology", an exhibition curated by Joan Murray with a national tour (1987–1990). In the 1980s, she also worked in the crafts program at Holland College, in PEI. The Prince Edward Island Council of the Arts stated that, besides her career as an artist and arts advocate, she shared with her students her passion for the integration of design principles in handicraft design.

In 1989, her partner Reshard Gool died, and she and her family created a provincial scholarship for Prince Edward Island students in his honour. In 2001, her exhibition Timepiece, which showed at the Confederation Centre Art Gallery, featured sculpture, sound environments, and complex multilayered prints, accompanied by a book by Linda Rae Dornan. One of Woolnough's final projects, in conjunction with Amnesty International, concerned the crisis at the Guantanamo Bay detention camp. Titled Guantánamo (2004–2005), the 12-piece show, with a large multi-paneled theatrical installation fifteen metres long, toured worldwide, including in Japan. In it, she developed her ongoing interest in the human figure into a major political statement about injustice.

== Community activism ==
Woolnough was a driving force in many artistic organizations in Prince Edward Island, including galleries and the PEI Printmakers' Council, the P.E.I. Council of the Arts, and The Arts Guild. After her death from cancer on 12 December 2007, at age 73, the Hilda Woolnough Memorial Scholarship was founded in her memory. In 2013, the Confederation Centre Art Gallery in Charlottetown presented a retrospective of her work in recognition of her contributions as an artist and arts advocate on Prince Edward Island. As stated by the Prince Edward Island Council of the Arts, Woolnough "has left a wonderful legacy for artists both on the Island and throughout Canada". She had a massive impact through her many activities in her years in P.E.I., as can be seen from the following words from an area museum director.

"From organizing children’s art exhibitions and Students’ Art Expo, to the development with her partner Reshard Gool of an alternative newspaper and Square Deal Press, and to her instrumental role in the creation of many artistic organizations, including the Phoenix Gallery, the Gallery-On-Demand, Great George Street Gallery, the PEI Printmakers’ Council, the P.E.I. Council of the Arts, and the Arts Guild, Hilda left an indelible mark on Prince Edward Island, and also nationally as director of the Canadian Conference of the Arts from 1989 to 1996".

== Honours ==
Woolnough received the Father Adrien Arsenault Senior Arts Award recognizing achievement as a Prince Edward Island artist in 1999, and was elected to the Royal Canadian Academy in 2000. In 2021, the P.E.I. Gallery in The Arts Guild was named for her and held a retrospective exhibition of her work titled All Things Hilda: A Retrospective.

== Collections ==
Woolnough's work is in the following collections:

- Art Gallery of Jamaica
- Art Gallery of Nova Scotia
- Art Gallery of Ontario
- The Confederation Centre Art Gallery
- Gotland Museum, Visby, Sweden
- Memorial University Art Gallery, St. John's, Newfoundland
- Montreal Museum of Fine Arts
- New Brunswick Art Gallery and Museum, St. John, NB
- Robert McLaughlin Gallery, Oshawa, Ontario
- Canada Council Art Bank
- Air Canada, Montreal, Quebec

== Personal life ==
Woolnough's son is Writer/Director John Hopkins who has won over 20 Canadian and international awards. His documentary films and work as Director of Photography have been broadcast on CTV, CBC, Bravo, Arte, TVO, Documentary Channel, and Discovery Channel. He wrote, directed and lensed the NFB feature documentary Bluefin (2016) and has made a film about Woolnough titled Timepiece.

== Bibliography ==
- Murray, Joan (1987). The Best Contemporary Canadian Art. Edmonton: Hurtig. Archived from the original on 30 June 2020.
