= Darlington, Prince Edward Island =

Darlington
- Rural municipality
- Darlington in Prince Edward Island
- Coordinates: 46.316°N 63.327°W
- Country: Canada
- Province: Prince Edward Island
- County: Queens County

Population
  - Total: 99
- Time zone: AST
  - Summer (DST): ADT
- Area code: 902

Darlington (population: 99) is a rural municipality in Prince Edward Island, Canada.

== Demographics ==
Federal census population history of Darlington
Year	Pop.	±%
2016	90	—
2021	99	+10.0%
Source: Statistics Canada

In the 2021 Census of Population conducted by Statistics Canada, Darlington had a population of 99 living in 40 of its 45 total private dwellings, a change of 10% from its 2016 population of 90. With a land area of 7.72 km^{2} (2.98 sq mi), it had a population density of 12.8/km^{2} (33.2/sq mi) in 2021.
