= Eastern Kings =

- Community
- Municipality of Eastern Kings
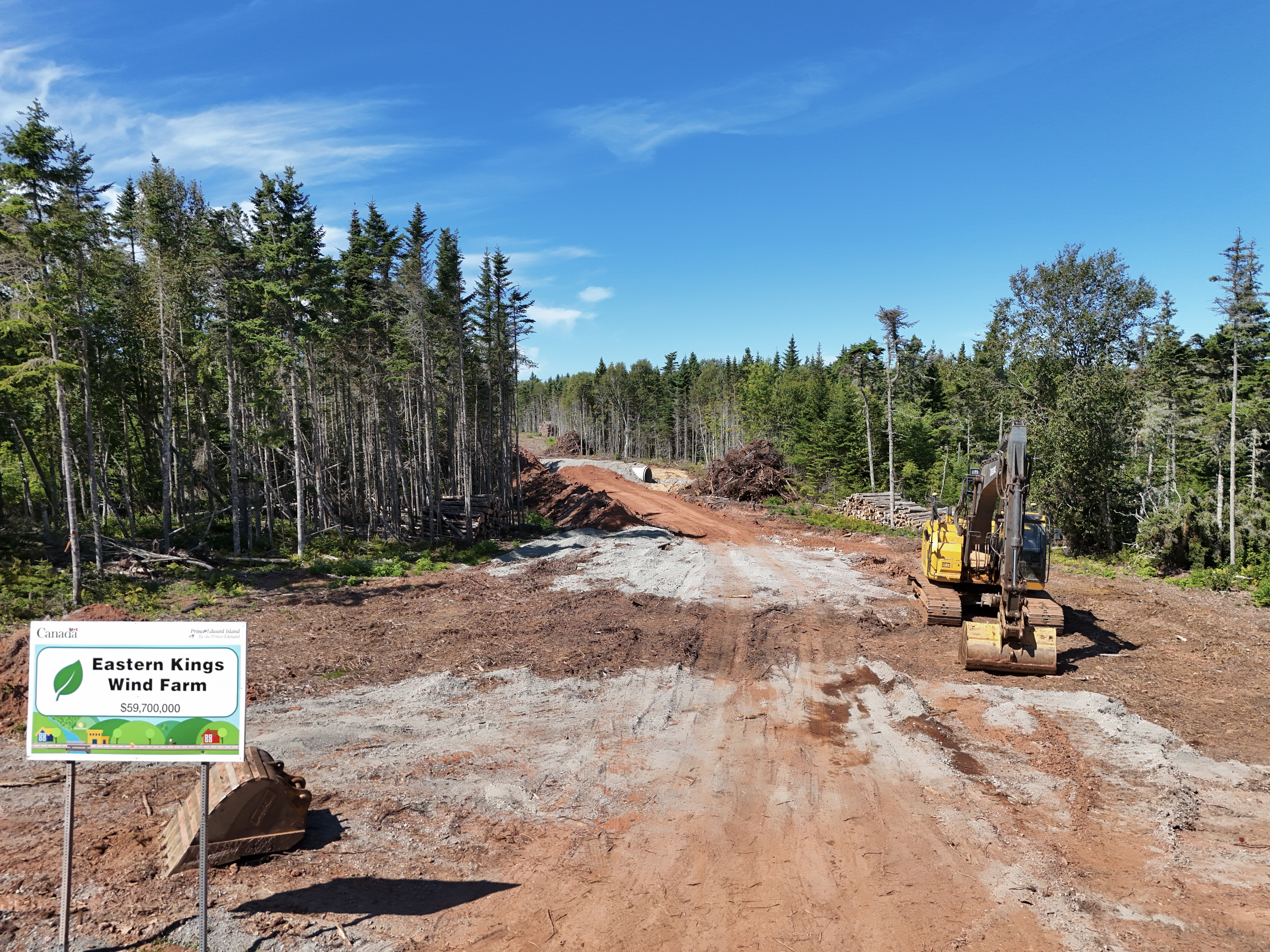
- Tree clearing site for the proposed wind farm

- Eastern Kings in Prince Edward Island
- Coordinates: 46.433°N 62.100°W
- Country: Canada
- Province: Prince Edward Island
- County: Kings County
- Incorporated: 1974

Population (2021)
  - Total: 687
- Time zone: AST
  - Summer (DST): ADT
- Area code: 902

Eastern Kings is a municipality that holds community status in Prince Edward Island, Canada. It was incorporated in 1974.

== Demographics ==
Federal census population history of Eastern Kings
Year	Pop.	±%
2011	702	—
2016	698	−0.6%
2021	687	−1.6%
Source: Statistics Canada

In the 2021 Census of Population conducted by Statistics Canada, Eastern Kings had a population of 687 living in 294 of its 499 total private dwellings, a change of −1.6% from its 2016 population of 698. With a land area of 141.12 km^{2} (54.49 sq mi), it had a population density of 4.9/km^{2} (12.6/sq mi) in 2021.

== See also ==
- List of communities in Prince Edward Island
