= Hazelbrook, Prince Edward Island =

Hazelbrook
- Rural municipality
- Hazelbrook in Prince Edward Island
- Coordinates: 46.219°N 62.992°W
- Country: Canada
- Province: Prince Edward Island
- County: Queens County
- Time zone: AST
  - Summer (DST): ADT
- Area code: 902

Hazelbrook (Population: 220) is a rural municipality in Prince Edward Island, Canada.

== Demographics ==
Federal census population history of Hazelbrook
Year	Pop.	±%
2016	193	—
2021	220	+14.0%
Source: Statistics Canada

In the 2021 Census of Population conducted by Statistics Canada, Hazelbrook had a population of 220 living in 84 of its 91 total private dwellings, a change of 14% from its 2016 population of 193. With a land area of 8.09 km^{2} (3.12 sq mi), it had a population density of 27.2/km^{2} (70.4/sq mi) in 2021.
