= Kent MacDonald =

Canadian politician

Kent MacDonald MP
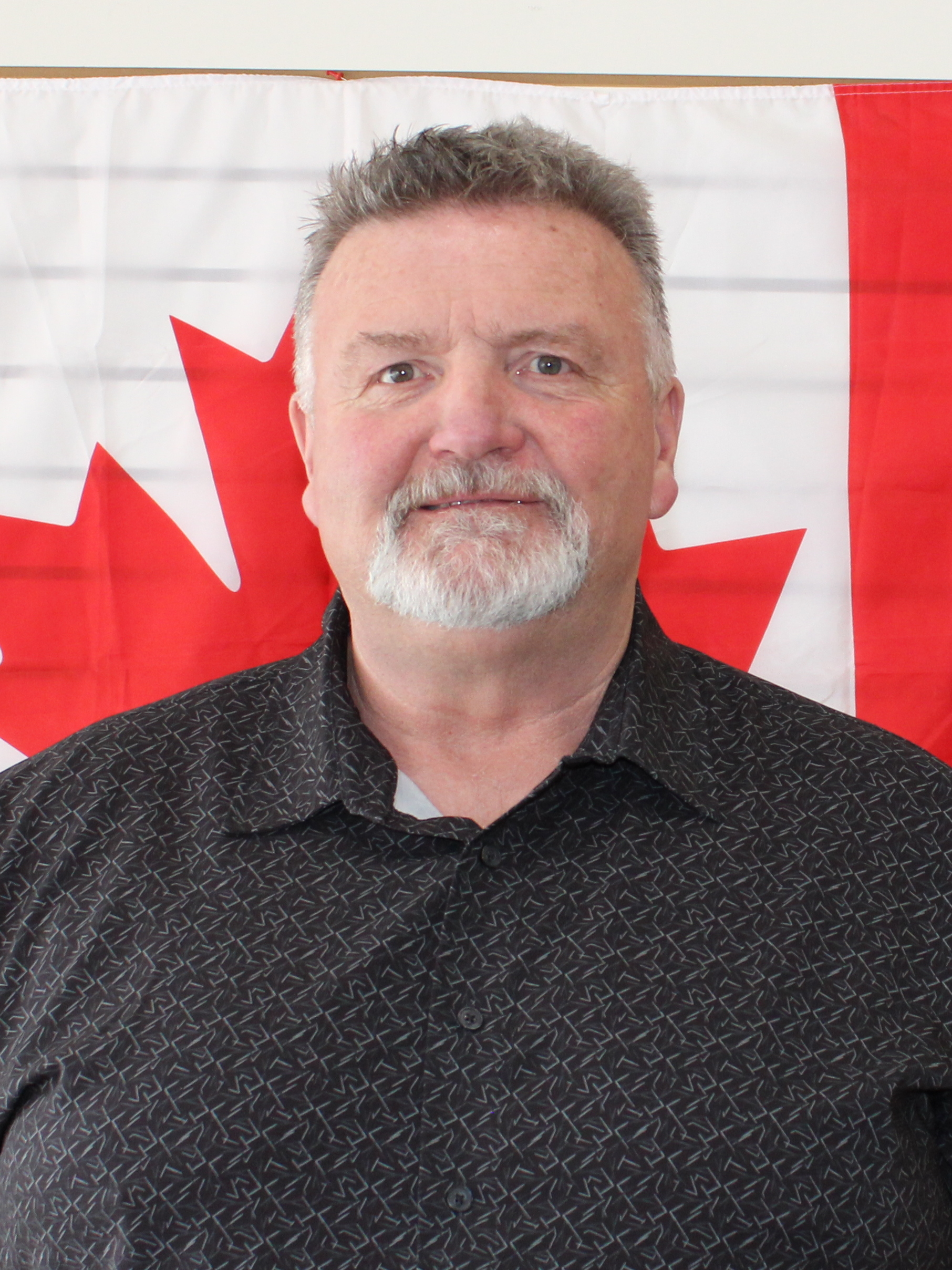
- MacDonald in 2025

Member of Parliament for Cardigan
- Incumbent
- Assumed office April 28, 2025
- Preceded by: Lawrence MacAulay

Personal details
- Party: Liberal

Kent MacDonald MP is a Canadian politician from the Liberal Party of Canada. He was elected Member of Parliament for Cardigan in the 2025 Canadian federal election.

MacDonald spent 38 years running a dairy farm in Little Pond, Prince Edward Island before entering politics. When longtime Cardigan MP Lawrence MacAulay announced his retirement in early March 2025, MacDonald decided to seek the Liberal nomination.

On election night he defeated Conservative Party of Canada candidate James Aylward by a margin of 57 per cent to 37.4 per cent.

At the time of the 2025 Canadian federal election, he lived in Little Pond, Prince Edward Island.

== Electoral record ==
2025 Canadian federal election: Cardigan
Party	Candidate	Votes	%	±%	Expenditures
Liberal	Kent MacDonald	14,404	57.02	+6.45	$78,831.16
Conservative	James Aylward	9,442	37.38	+6.47	$64,003.92
New Democratic	Lynne Thiele	505	2.00	−7.77	$3,468.36
Independent	Wayne Phelan	404	1.60	N/A	none listed
Green	Maria Rodriguez	326	1.29	−3.52	$3,182.49
People's	Adam Harding	180	0.71	−2.57	$1,419.10
Total valid votes/expense limit		25,261	99.09	–0.01	$108,573.82
Total rejected ballots		233	0.91	+0.01	
Turnout		25,494	79.55		
Eligible voters		32,048			
Liberal notional hold		Swing		−0.01	
Source: Elections Canada
Note: number of eligible voters does not include voting day registrations.
