= Central Kings =

- Rural municipality
- Central Kings in Prince Edward Island
- Coordinates: 46.318°N 62.504°W
- Country: Canada
- Province: Prince Edward Island
- County: Kings County

Population
  - Total: 329
- Time zone: AST
  - Summer (DST): ADT
- Area code: 902

Central Kings (population: 329) is a rural municipality in Prince Edward Island, Canada.

== Demographics ==
Federal census population history of Central Kings
| Year | Pop. | ±% |
|---|---|---|
| 2016 | 349 | — |
| 2021 | 386 | +10.6% |
Source: Statistics Canada

In the 2021 Census of Population conducted by Statistics Canada, Central Kings had a population of 386 living in 155 of its 176 total private dwellings, a change of 10.6% from its 2016 population of 349. With a land area of 72.94 km^{2} (28.16 sq mi), it had a population density of 5.3/km^{2} (13.7/sq mi) in 2021.
