= Hampshire, Prince Edward Island =

Hampshire
- Rural municipality
- Hampshire in Prince Edward Island
- Coordinates: 46.288°N 63.280°W
- Country: Canada
- Province: Prince Edward Island
- County: Queens County
- Incorporated: 1974

Area
  - Land: 13.52 km^{2} (5.22 sq mi)

Population (2021)
  - Total: 339
  - Density: 25.1/km^{2} (65/sq mi)
- Time zone: AST
  - Summer (DST): ADT
- Area code: 902

Hampshire is a rural municipality in Prince Edward Island, Canada. It was incorporated in 1974 and has a population of 339.

== Demographics ==
Federal census population history of Hampshire
Year	Pop.	±%
2016	359	—
2021	339	−5.6%
Source: Statistics Canada

In the 2021 Census of Population conducted by Statistics Canada, Hampshire had a population of 339 living in 129 of its 136 total private dwellings, a change of −5.6% from its 2016 population of 359. With a land area of 13.52 km^{2} (5.22 sq mi), it had a population density of 25.1/km^{2} (64.9/sq mi) in 2021.
