= Brackley, Prince Edward Island =

Brackley
- Rural municipality
- Rural Municipality of Brackley
- Brackley in Prince Edward Island
- Coordinates: 46°17′52.3″N 63°8′31.3″W
- Country: Canada
- Province: Prince Edward Island
- County: Queens County
- Incorporated: 1983
- Amalgamated: December 15, 2017
- Rural municipality: December 23, 2017

Population (2021)
  - Total: 586
- Time zone: AST
  - Summer (DST): ADT
- Area code: 902
- Website: http://brackleypei.ca

Brackley is a rural municipality in Prince Edward Island, Canada. It is located on the northern boundary of Charlottetown, adjoining the Charlottetown Airport that is in the neighbourhood of Sherwood. Brackley originally incorporated in 1983. It absorbed the adjacent former municipality of Winsloe South via amalgamation on December 15, 2017.

== Demographics ==
Federal census population history of Brackley (pre-amalgamation)
Year	Pop.	±%
1981	295	—
1986	306	+3.7%
1991	327	+6.9%
1996	367	+12.2%
2001	358	−2.5%
2006	336	−6.1%
2011	340	+1.2%
2016	372	+9.4%
Source: Statistics Canada

Federal census population history of Brackley (post-amalgamation)
Year	Pop.	±%
2016	596	—
2021	586	−1.7%
Source: Statistics Canada

In the 2021 Census of Population conducted by Statistics Canada, Brackley had a population of 586 living in 234 of its 240 total private dwellings, a change of −1.7% from its 2016 population of 596. With a land area of 18.75 km^{2} (7.24 sq mi), it had a population density of 31.3/km^{2} (80.9/sq mi) in 2021.
