= Kingston, Prince Edward Island =

Kingston
- Rural municipality
- Kingston in Prince Edward Island
- Coordinates: 46.263°N 63.276°W
- Country: Canada
- Province: Prince Edward Island
- County: Queens County
- Lot: Lot 30

Area
  - Land: 48.38 km^{2} (18.68 sq mi)
- Elevation: 39 m (128 ft)

Population (2021)
  - Total: 1,111
  - Density: 23/km^{2} (60/sq mi)
- Time zone: UTC-04:00 (AST)
  - Summer (DST): UTC-03:00 (ADT)
- Postal code span: C0A
- Area codes: 902, 782
- Website: kingstonpei.ca

Kingston is a rural municipality in Prince Edward Island, Canada. It is located within Queens County to the west of Charlottetown. The community is mainly farms with a small residential area.

== Demographics ==
Federal census population history of Kingston
Year	Pop.	±%
2016	1,047	—
2021	1,111	+6.1%
Source: Statistics Canada

In the 2021 Census of Population conducted by Statistics Canada, Kingston had a population of 1,111 living in 395 of its 412 total private dwellings, a change of 6.1% from its 2016 population of 1,047. With a land area of 48.38 km^{2} (18.68 sq mi), it had a population density of 23.0/km^{2} (59.5/sq mi) in 2021.

== Government ==
Local government in Kingston is in the form of a seven-member community council with a chair. The council sits at Cornwall Post Office in Cornwall, Prince Edward Island.

Provincially, the area is covered by the following three districts with a MLA representing each:

- West Royalty-Springvale;
- Cornwall-Meadowbank; and
- Kellys Cross-Cumberland.

At the federal level, it is located within the riding of Charlottetown.

Kingston federal election results
Year	Liberal		Conservative		New Democratic		Green	
2021	39%	263	31%	208	9%	57	18%	122
2019	41%	262	24%	154	7%	46	28%	180

Kingston provincial election results
Year	PC		Liberal		Green	
2023	45%	254	9%	49	41%	232
2019	31%	198	11%	73	58%	375
2015	21%	127	25%	152	51%	305

== Attractions ==
Kingston United Church, c 1863.

== Royalty ==
King of Kingston, Noah Woodworth, c 1999.

== Transportation ==
The main roads in Kingston is Kingston Road (Route 235 (Prince Edward Island)) and Bannockburn Road (Route 247 (Prince Edward Island)) are secondary provincial highways. The closest airport is Charlottetown Airport and there are no railway lines as they are not found in the province.
