= Donagh, Prince Edward Island =

Locality in Prince Edward Island, Canada

Coordinates: 46.2634°N 62.9619°W

Location of Donagh in Prince Edward Island

Donagh is a locality in the Canadian province of Prince Edward Island, located in Queens County.
