= Annandale-Little Pond-Howe Bay =

- Community
- Rural Municipality of Annandale-Little Pond-Howe Bay
- Annandale-Little Pond-Howe Bay in Prince Edward Island
- Coordinates: 46.285°N 62.411°W
- Country: Canada
- Province: Prince Edward Island
- County: Kings County
- Incorporated: 1975

Population (2021)
  - Total: 223
- Time zone: AST
  - Summer (DST): ADT
- Area code: 902

Annandale-Little Pond-Howe Bay is a rural municipality located in Kings County, Prince Edward Island. It was incorporated in 1975.

== Demographics ==
Federal census population history of Annandale – Little Pond – Howe Bay
Year	Pop.	±%
2011	262	—
2016	207	−21.0%
2021	223	+7.7%
Source: Statistics Canada

In the 2021 Census of Population conducted by Statistics Canada, Annandale – Little Pond – Howe Bay had a population of 223 living in 92 of its 169 total private dwellings, a change of 7.7% from its 2016 population of 207. With a land area of 31.87 km^{2} (12.31 sq mi), it had a population density of 7.0/km^{2} (18.1/sq mi) in 2021.

== See also ==
- List of municipalities in Prince Edward Island
