= York, Prince Edward Island =

York
- Community
- Municipality of York
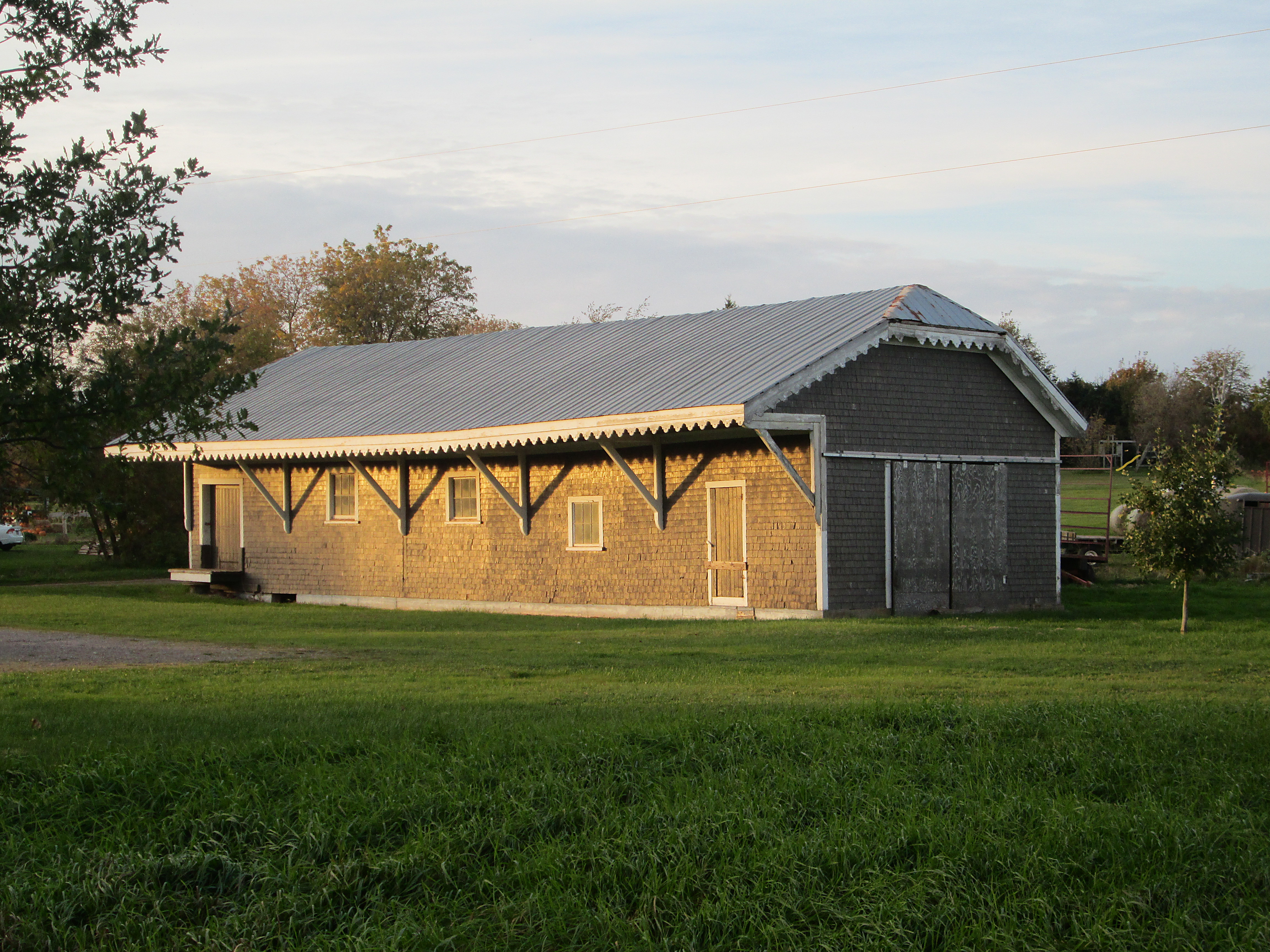
- Old Train Station, York, PEI

- York in Prince Edward Island
- Coordinates: 46.316°N 63.098°W
- Country: Canada
- Province: Prince Edward Island
- County: Queens County
- Incorporated: 1986

Population (2021)
  - Total: 387
- Time zone: AST
  - Summer (DST): ADT
- Area code: 902

York is a municipality that holds community status in Prince Edward Island, Canada. It was incorporated in 1986.

== Demographics ==
Federal census population history of York
Year	Pop.	±%
2016	414	—
2021	387	−6.5%
Source: Statistics Canada

In the 2021 Census of Population conducted by Statistics Canada, York had a population of 387 living in 154 of its 163 total private dwellings, a change of −6.5% from its 2016 population of 414. With a land area of 12.27 km^{2} (4.74 sq mi), it had a population density of 31.5/km^{2} (81.7/sq mi) in 2021.

== See also ==
- List of communities in Prince Edward Island
