= Sherbrooke, Prince Edward Island =

Sherbrooke
- Rural municipality
- Sherbrooke in Prince Edward Island
- Coordinates: 46.423°N 63.759°W
- Country: Canada
- Province: Prince Edward Island
- County: Prince County

Population
  - Total: 178
- Time zone: AST
  - Summer (DST): ADT
- Area code: 902

Sherbrooke is a rural municipality in Prince Edward Island, Canada.

== Demographics ==
Federal census population history of Sherbrooke
Year	Pop.	±%
1981	461	—
1986	567	+23.0%
1991	613	+8.1%
1996	160	−73.9%
2001	178	+11.3%
2006	168	−5.6%
2011	172	+2.4%
2016	159	−7.6%
2021	178	+11.9%
Source: Statistics Canada

In the 2021 Census of Population conducted by Statistics Canada, Sherbrooke had a population of 178 living in 76 of its 98 total private dwellings, a change of 11.9% from its 2016 population of 159. With a land area of 8.94 km^{2} (3.45 sq mi), it had a population density of 19.9/km^{2} (51.6/sq mi) in 2021.
