= Lot 30, Prince Edward Island =

- Township
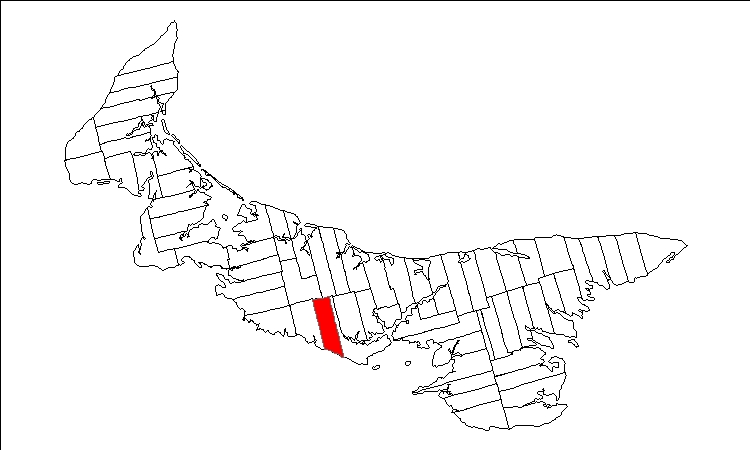
- Map of Prince Edward Island highlighting Lot 30
- Coordinates: 46°14′N 63°23′W
- Country: Canada
- Province: Prince Edward Island
- County: Queens County
- Parish: Hillsboro.

Area
  - Total: 86.29 km^{2} (33.32 sq mi)

Population (2006)
  - Total: 759
  - Density: 8.8/km^{2} (23/sq mi)
- Time zone: UTC-4 (AST)
  - Summer (DST): UTC-3 (ADT)
- Canadian Postal code: C0A
- Area code: 902
- NTS Map: 011L03
- GNBC Code: BAERQ

Lot 30 is a township in Queens County, Prince Edward Island, Canada. It is part of Hillsboro Parish. Lot 30 was awarded to John Murray in the 1767 land lottery.

== Localities ==
- Green Bay

== Demographics ==
Historical population
| Year | Pop. | ±% |
|---|---|---|
| 1871 | 1,430 | — |
| 1881 | 1,530 | +7.0% |
| 1891 | 1,417 | −7.4% |
| 1901 | 1,357 | −4.2% |
| 1911 | 1,181 | −13.0% |
| 1921 | 1,019 | −13.7% |
| 1931 | 880 | −13.6% |
| 1941 | 942 | +7.0% |
| 2006 | 759 | −19.4% |
