= Watervale, Prince Edward Island =

Community in Prince Edward Island, Canada

Coordinates: 46.268°N 62.897°W

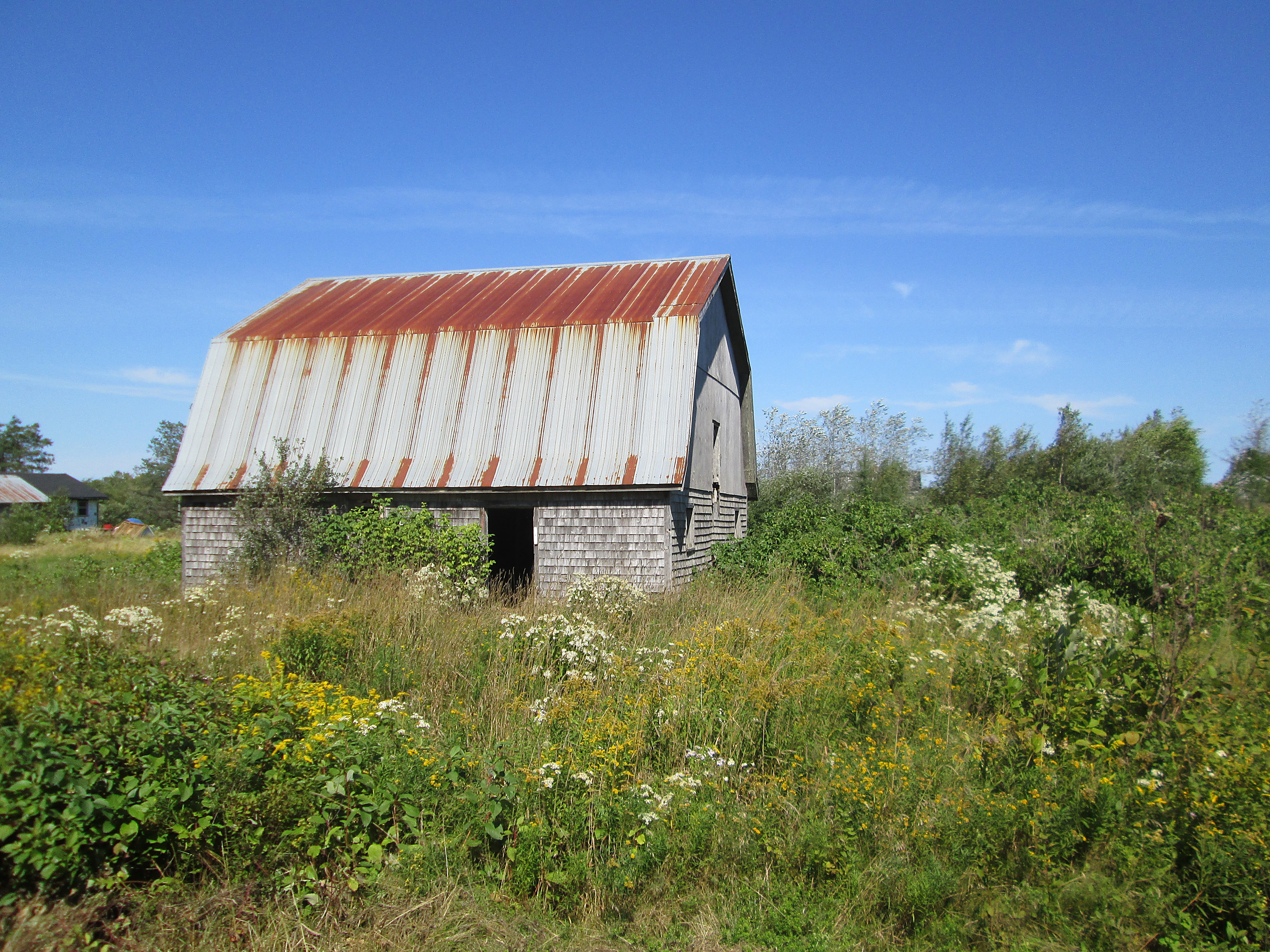

Watervale is a small farming community located about 20 km east of Charlottetown in lot #48 on Prince Edward Island, Canada. It was called Forgan's Hill but the members of the community voted to change the name sometime in the mid-19th century. While it presently has no retail outlets or public spaces, in the past it housed a community store, a family-run sawmill, a one-room school and a flag station on the Prince Edward Island Railway (PEIR). It has a population of approximately 50 permanent residents.
