= Northport, Prince Edward Island =

Northport
- Rural municipality
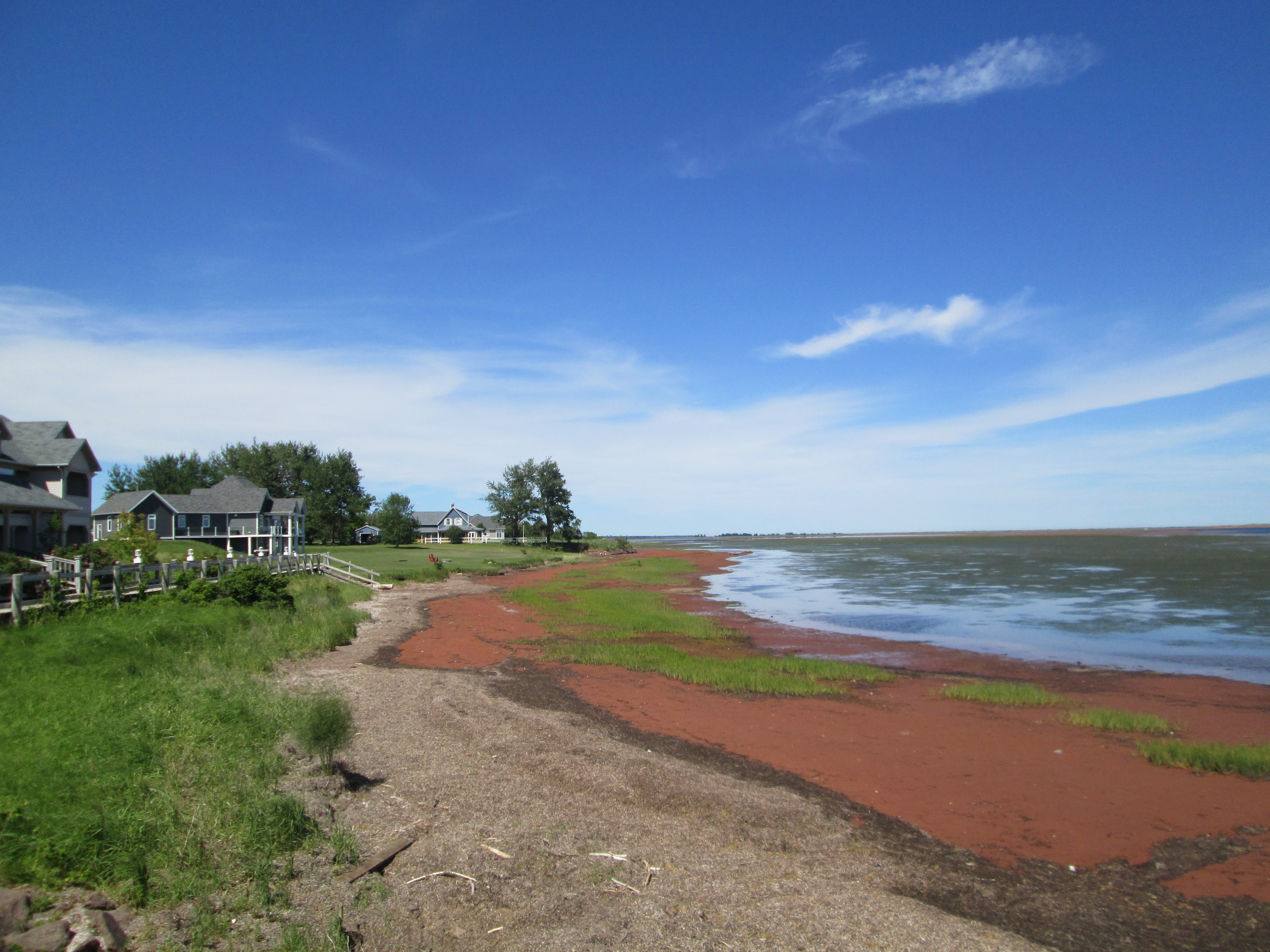
- Northport, July 2018

- Northport in Prince Edward Island
- Coordinates: 46.747°N 64.227°W
- Country: Canada
- Province: Prince Edward Island
- County: Prince County
- Lot: 5

Government
  - Mayor: Lois Drummond

Population
  - Total: 118
- Time zone: AST
  - Summer (DST): ADT
- Area code: 902

Northport (population: 188) is a rural municipality in Prince Edward Island, Canada. It is located in Lot 5 township.

== Demographics ==
Federal census population history of Northport
Year	Pop.	±%
2016	186	—
2021	157	−15.6%
Source: Statistics Canada

In the 2021 Census of Population conducted by Statistics Canada, Northport had a population of 157 living in 74 of its 79 total private dwellings, a change of −15.6% from its 2016 population of 186. With a land area of 1.73 km^{2} (0.67 sq mi), it had a population density of 90.8/km^{2} (235.0/sq mi) in 2021.
