= Lot 33, Prince Edward Island =

- Township
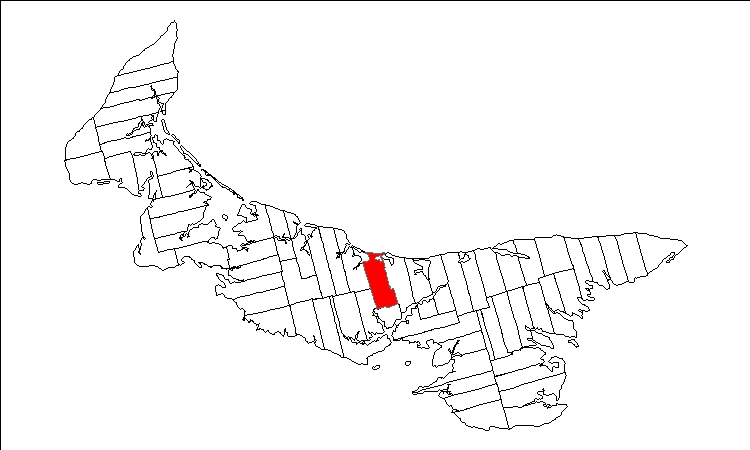
- Map of Prince Edward Island highlighting Lot 33
- Coordinates: 46°21′N 63°10′W
- Country: Canada
- Province: Prince Edward Island
- County: Queens County
- Parish: Charlotte Parish.

Area
  - Total: 52.01 km^{2} (20.08 sq mi)

Population
  - Total: 1,067
  - Density: 20.5/km^{2} (53/sq mi)
- Time zone: UTC-4 (AST)
  - Summer (DST): UTC-3 (ADT)
- Canadian Postal code: C0A
- Area code: 902
- NTS Map: 011L06
- GNBC Code: BAERT

Lot 33 is a township in Queens County, Prince Edward Island, Canada. It is part of Charlotte Parish. Lot 33 was awarded to Colonel Richard Worge in the 1767 land lottery.

== Demographics ==
Historical population
| Year | Pop. | ±% |
|---|---|---|
| 1871 | 1,219 | — |
| 1881 | 1,332 | +9.3% |
| 1891 | 1,279 | −4.0% |
| 1901 | 1,120 | −12.4% |
| 1911 | 991 | −11.5% |
| 1921 | 981 | −1.0% |
| 1931 | 1,063 | +8.4% |
| 1941 | 1,106 | +4.0% |
