= Souris West =

- Community
- Municipality of Souris West
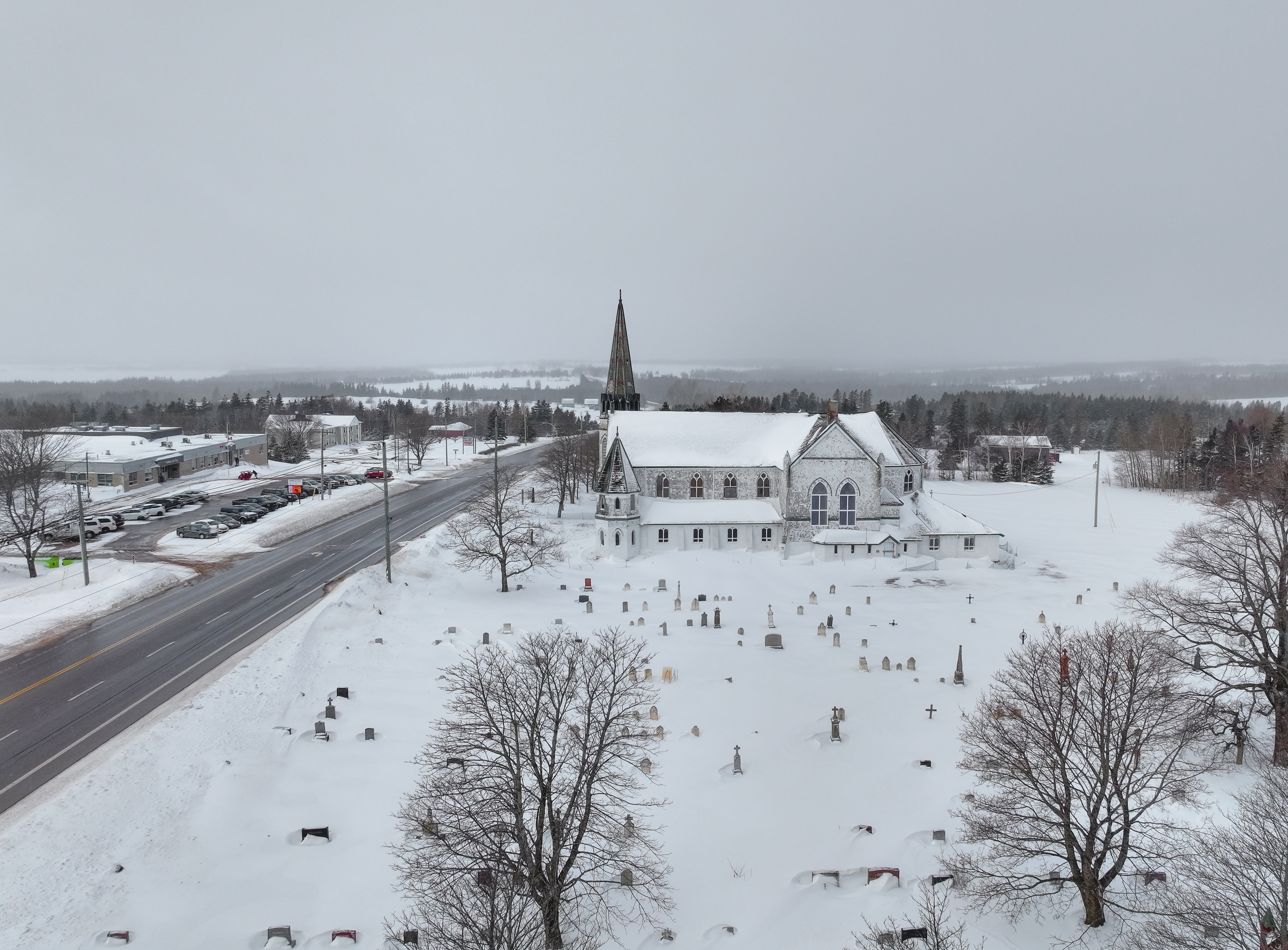

- Souris West in Prince Edward Island
- Coordinates: 46.359°N 62.283°W
- Country: Canada
- Province: Prince Edward Island
- County: Kings County
- Incorporated: 1972

Population (2011)
  - Total: 399
- Time zone: AST
  - Summer (DST): ADT
- Area code: 902

Souris West is a municipality that holds community status in Prince Edward Island, Canada. It was incorporated in 1972. Contains the Locality of Souris West and part of the Locality of Lower Rollo Bay.

== Demographics ==
Federal census population history of Souris West
Year	Pop.	±%
2016	361	—
2021	379	+5.0%
Source: Statistics Canada

In the 2021 Census of Population conducted by Statistics Canada, Souris West had a population of 379 living in 159 of its 227 total private dwellings, a change of 5% from its 2016 population of 361. With a land area of 7.73 km^{2} (2.98 sq mi), it had a population density of 49.0/km^{2} (127.0/sq mi) in 2021.

== See also ==
- List of communities in Prince Edward Island
