= Victoria, Prince Edward Island =

- Community
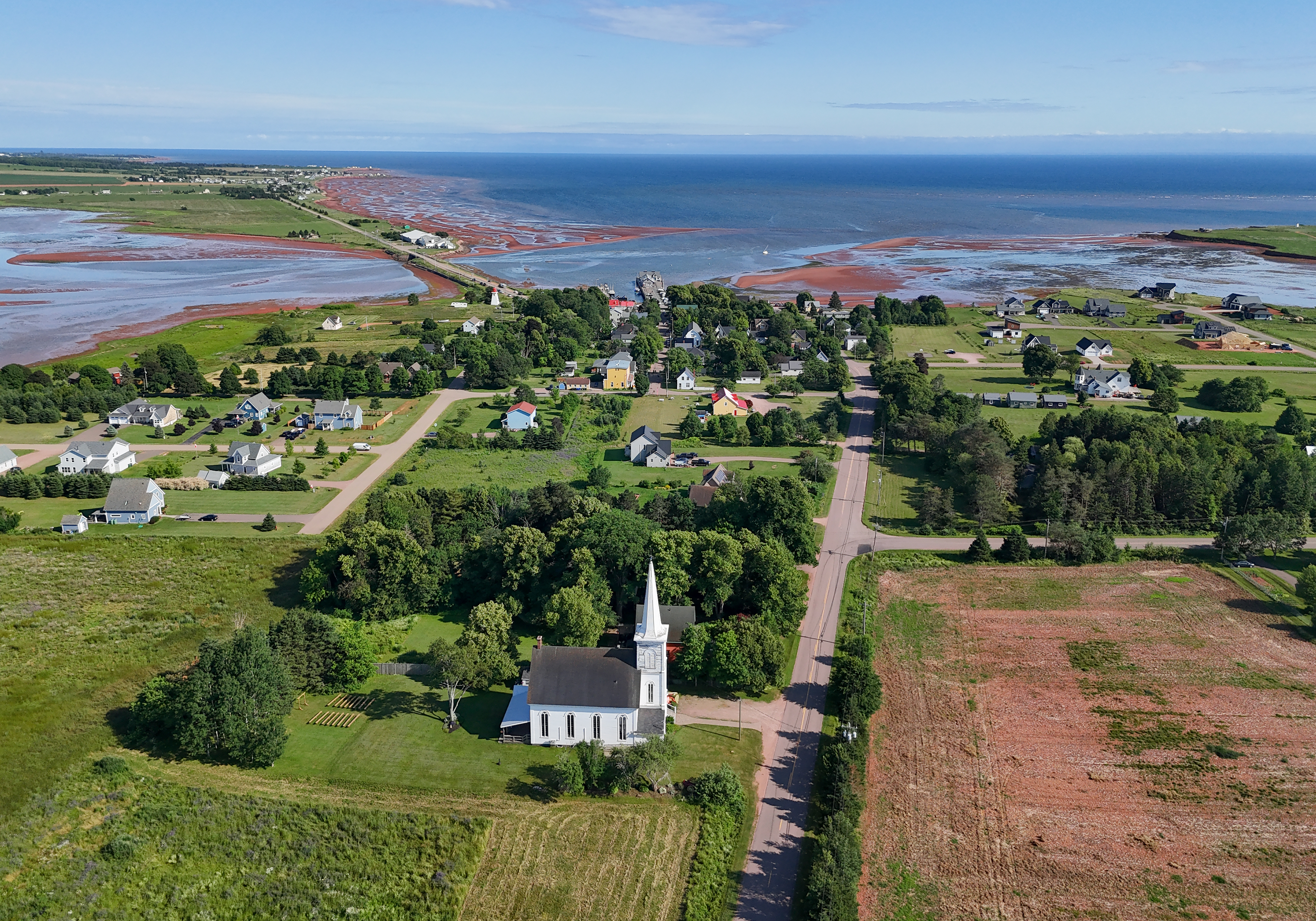
- Nickname: Victoria-by-the-sea
- Victoria in Prince Edward Island
- Coordinates: 46.21399°N 63.48913°W
- Country: Canada
- Province: Prince Edward Island
- County: Queens County
- Founded: 1819
- Incorporated: 1951

Area
  - Land: 1.46 km^{2} (0.56 sq mi)

Population (2016)
  - Total: 74
  - Density: 50.8/km^{2} (132/sq mi)
- Time zone: UTC-4 (AST)
  - Summer (DST): UTC-3 (ADT)
- Canadian postal code: C0A 2G0
- Area code: 902
- Telephone Exchange: 658 730
- NTS Map: 011L03
- GNBC Code: BACOS
- Website: rmvictoria.com

Victoria is a rural municipality in Prince Edward Island, Canada. A historic seaport, the community is situated at the extreme southwestern edge of Queens County in the township of Lot 29.

== History ==
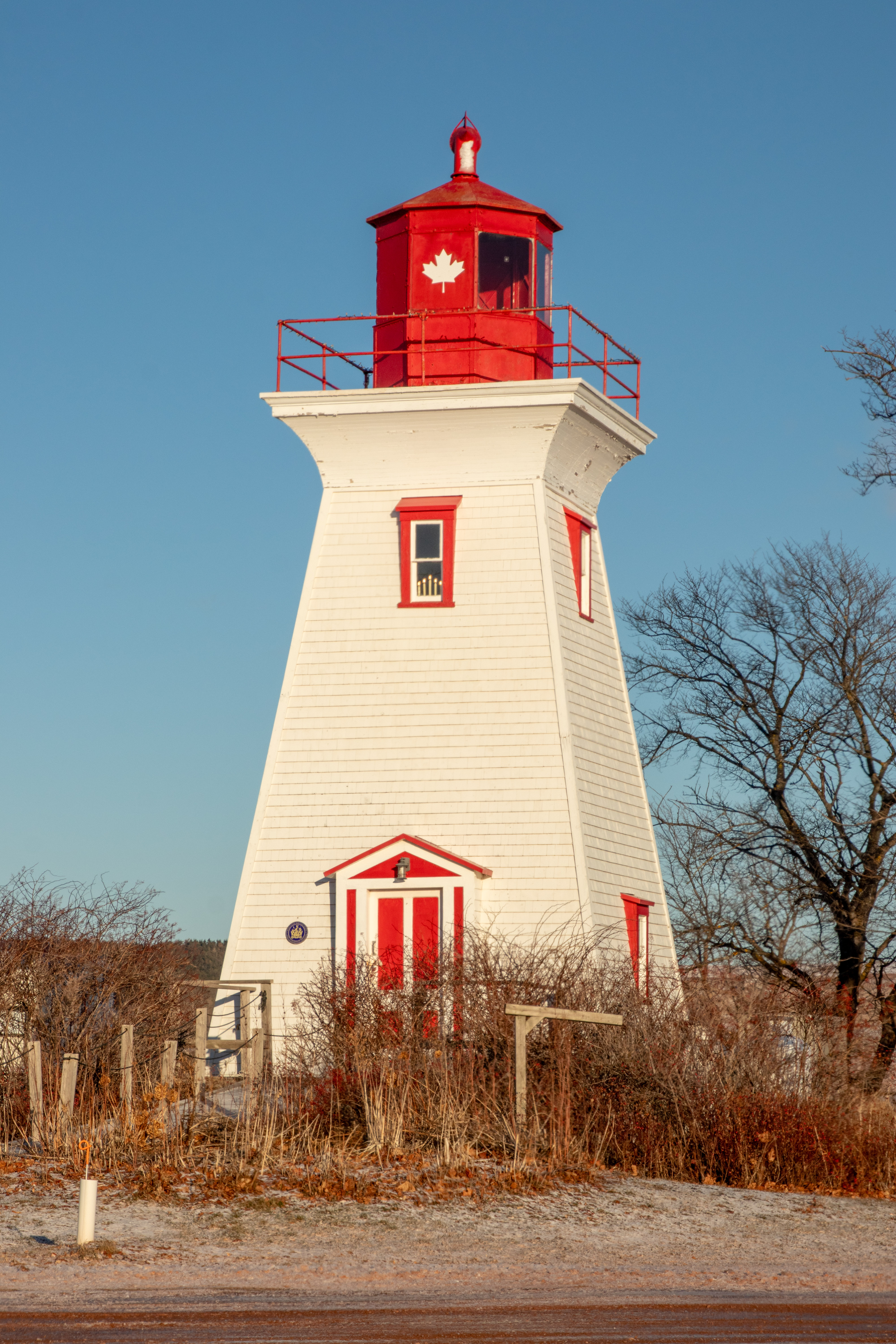
Victoria Range Lighthouse in 2026

Victoria, tucked neatly on the south shore of Prince Edward Island, halfway between PEI's largest cities of Charlottetown and Summerside, was founded in 1819 by James Bardin Palmer, an immigrant lawyer and agent for the Earl of Westmoreland. His son Donald, following a well-conceived plan, laid out the community on Palmer's estate. The effect can still be seen today by the grid pattern of its streets.

By the late 1800s the settlement was prosperous with three wharves and many thriving businesses. Because of its sheltered harbour and strategic location, Victoria became an important seaport with a significant amount of trade with Europe, the West Indies and other East Coast ports. A wide variety of produce, including potatoes and eggs, was shipped by schooner from Victoria until the early 1900s. In the days of the steamboats Victoria was a regular stop for the SS Harland, dropping off visitors from Charlottetown and places further afield, to spend a few days relaxing in the community by the sea.

To accommodate the increase in shipping commerce and traveling visitors, the community developed services to cater to them including hotels, a general store various stores and, a bank, a rink, a fox farm, a blacksmith shop, and a farm equipment dealer.

The rink was home to the Victoria Union, one of the most successful hockey teams in the Maritimes. When the Trans-Canada Highway bypassed Victoria many businesses and facilities relocated to nearby Crapaud. Today, with a year-round population of under two hundred, there are a number of family-run businesses employing local people, just as there were in the prosperous years up to the 1950s.

In the February 1982 issue of Atlantic Insight, Stephen Kimber commented on the community:

The Trans-Canada Highway bypassed Victoria. So did the shopping centres and tourist amusement parks.
And that - along with its independent-minded citizens - is what makes Victoria the enchanting,
picture post card place it is today."

== Demographics ==
Federal census population history of Victoria
Year	Pop.	±%
1956	146	—
1961	148	+1.4%
1966	169	+14.2%
1971	171	+1.2%
1976	164	−4.1%
1981	163	−0.6%
1986	189	+16.0%
1991	172	−9.0%
1996	158	−8.1%
2001	119	−24.7%
2006	77	−35.3%
2011	104	+35.1%
2016	74	−28.8%
2021	139	+87.8%
Source: Statistics Canada

In the 2021 Census of Population conducted by Statistics Canada, Victoria had a population of 139 living in 59 of its 84 total private dwellings, a change of 87.8%, the largest growth of any municipality on PEI, from its 2016 population of 74. With a land area of 1.44 km^{2} (0.56 sq mi), it had a population density of 96.5/km^{2} (250.0/sq mi) in 2021.

== Economy ==
There is agricultural and fishing activity in Victoria by the sea as well as an aquaculture research & development facility. However, tourism is a major aspect of the community's economy. There are multiple restaurants, gift shops, and inns. Visitors can get a true sense of the history of the community by viewing the exhibit Keeper’s of the Light at the Victoria Seaport Museum, which is located in Palmer's Range Light.

== See also ==
- Royal eponyms in Canada
