= North Rustico =

- Town
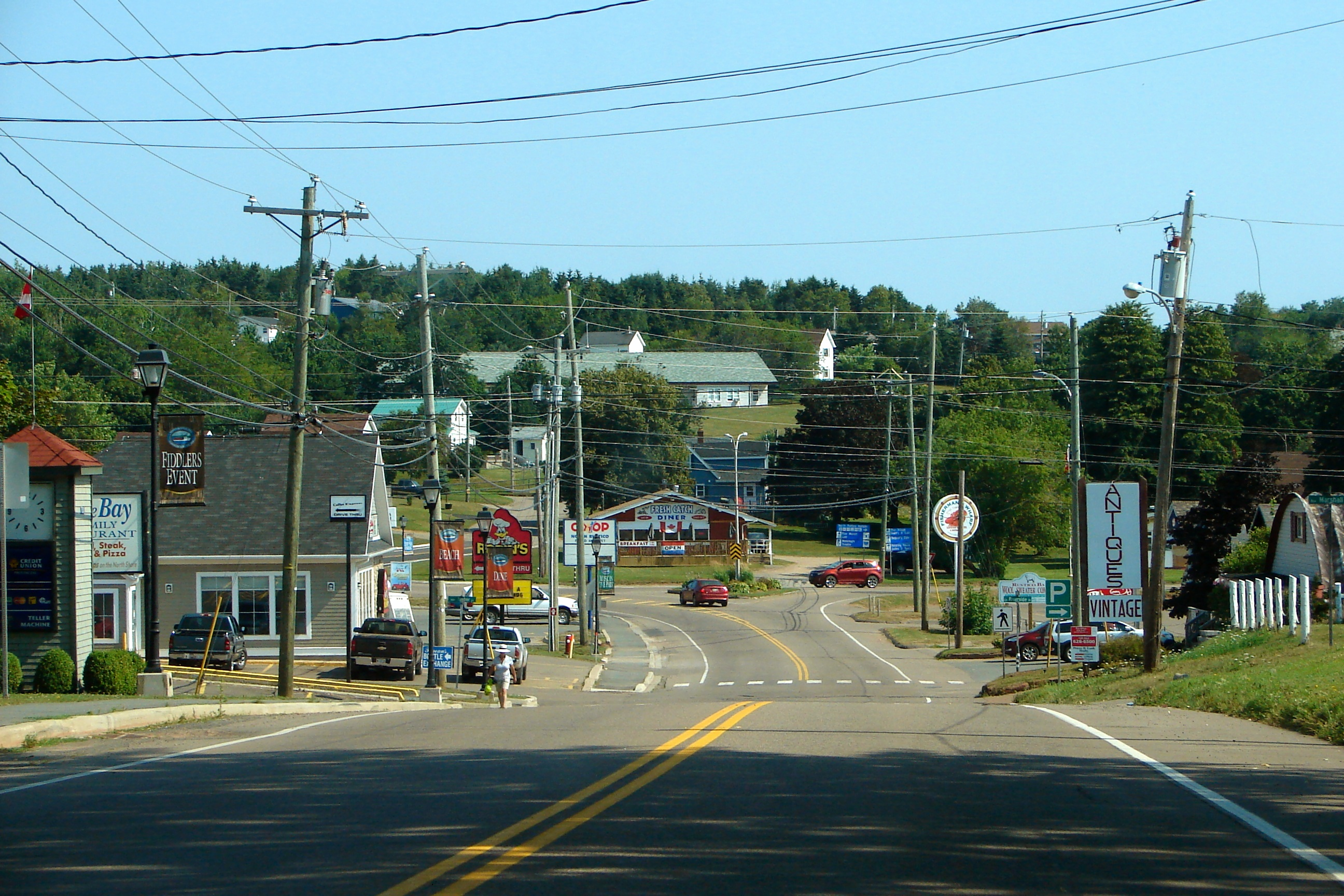
- Downtown North Rustico

- Location within Prince Edward Island
- Coordinates: 46.4583°N 63.3125°W
- Country: Canada
- Province: Prince Edward Island
- County: Queens
- Parish: Charlotte
- Lot: Lot 24
- Incorporated: 1954
- Town: November 16, 2013

Government
  - Type: Town Council
  - Mayor: Heather McKenna
  - Deputy Mayor: David LeClair
  - Councillors: Michelle Pineau; Patricia Doucette; Donna Coll; Margaret Goulding
  - CAO: Patsy Gamauf

Area
  - Total: 2.64 km^{2} (1.02 sq mi)

Population (2021)
  - Total: 648
  - Density: 245.7/km^{2} (636/sq mi)
  - Pop 2016-2021: ▲5.0%
  - Dwellings: 386
- Time zone: AST
  - Summer (DST): ADT
- Canadian postal code: C0A 1X0
- Area code: 902 (963 exchange)
- NTS Map: 011L06
- GNBC Code: BABYB
- Website: www.northrustico.com

North Rustico is a Canadian town located in Queens County, Prince Edward Island.

Situated on the north shore, North Rustico became an incorporated municipality in 1954. North Rustico changed its status to a town on November 16, 2013. The town is known to locals, as well as many others as "The Crick". Its population as of the 2021 Census was 648 people.

North Rustico is well known for its Canada Day celebration every year on July 1. The event usually attracts in excess of 10,000 people, which packs the town quite full. It includes festivities in the park, a parade down main street, as well as a boat parade on Rustico Harbour. The celebration is popular among families, teenagers and adults. The day is completed by a fireworks display over the bay.

== History ==
The village of North Rustico was founded circa 1790, around a small natural harbour along the Gulf of St. Lawrence coast. The region was home to a remnant Acadian population who fled British capture and deportation during the Seven Years' War (see Great Upheaval), although English, Scottish and Irish settlers moved into the area during the remainder of the 18th century and throughout the 19th and 20th centuries.

The name Rustico comes from Rassicot, the name of one of the first settlers from France.

The Farmers' Bank of Rustico in nearby South Rustico was founded and managed under the leadership of Father Georges-Antoine Belcourt, and received Royal Assent for its act of incorporation at the Court of Windsor on April 7, 1864. It is often considered to have been the first community-based bank in Canada. The bank building was designated a National Historic Site of Canada in 1959.

== Demographics ==
Federal census population history of North Rustico
Year	Pop.	±%
1956	814	—
1961	780	−4.2%
1966	874	+12.1%
1971	767	−12.2%
1976	727	−5.2%
1981	688	−5.4%
1986	635	−7.7%
1991	614	−3.3%
1996	650	+5.9%
2001	637	−2.0%
2006	599	−6.0%
2011	583	−2.7%
2016	607	+4.1%
2021	648	+6.8%
Source: Statistics Canada

In the 2021 Census of Population conducted by Statistics Canada, North Rustico had a population of 648 living in 321 of its 386 total private dwellings, a change of 5% from its 2016 population of 617. With a land area of 2.64 km^{2} (1.02 sq mi), it had a population density of 245.5/km^{2} (635.7/sq mi) in 2021.

== Economy ==
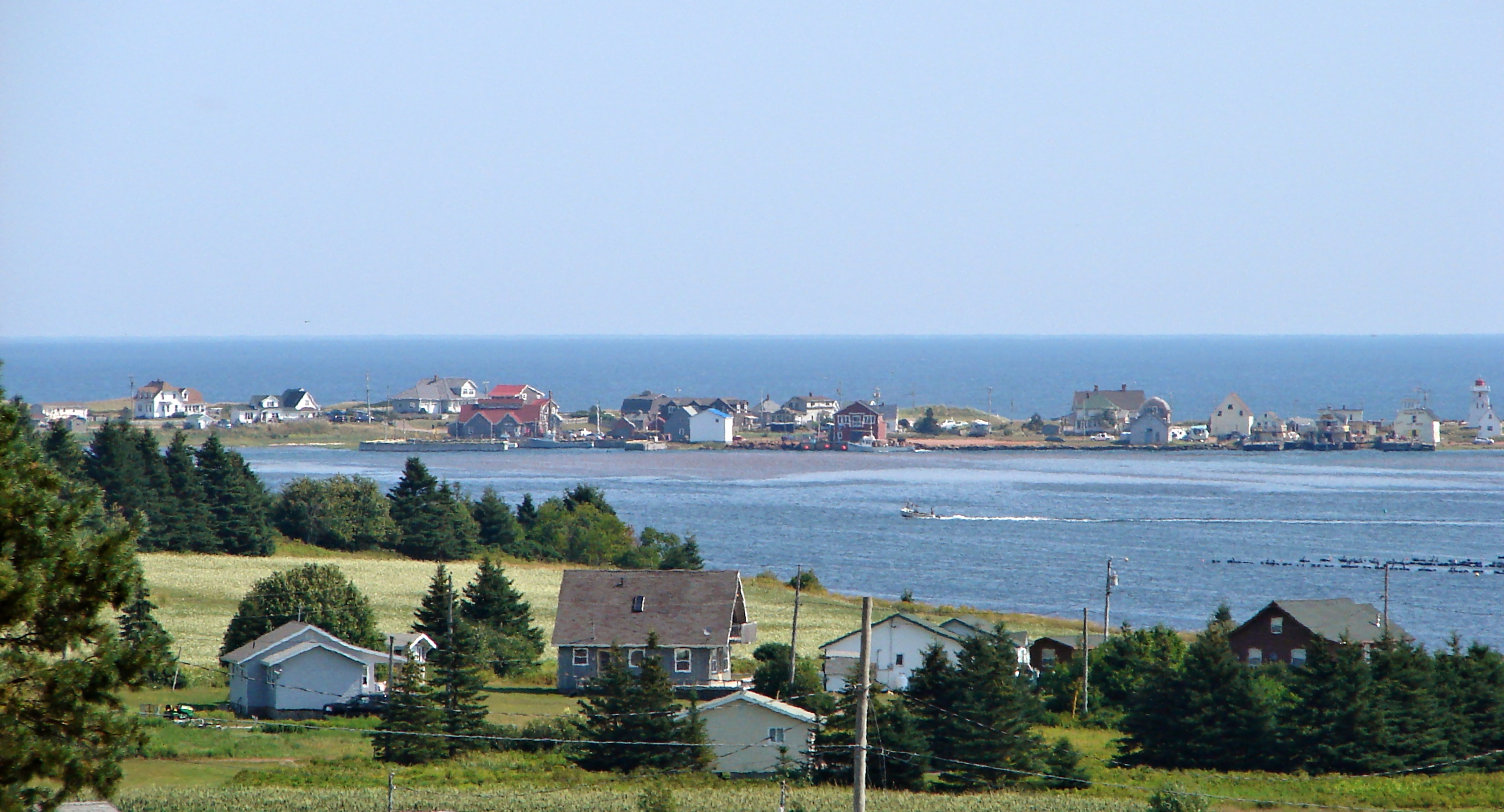
North Rustico Harbour

North Rustico's primary industries are fishing, tourism and agriculture. Located 30 kilometres (19 mi) northwest of Charlottetown, the town is increasingly becoming an exurb with residents commuting to work in the city.

Since the 1996 census, the town has witnessed a population decline of 2% in year-round residents. During the short summer tourist season on Prince Edward Island in July and August, the village's proximity to the Prince Edward Island National Park results in a temporary population expansion, with many visitors staying in nearby accommodations.

The town has 344 dwellings. In 2015, the median household income was $49,920, compared with the provincial average of $61,163. Many seasonal homes or cottages are owned by non-residents and are occupied for only several weeks during the summer months.

The fishing industry remains the village's most important economic activity, with approximately 40 vessels home-ported in a small craft harbour. Lobster fishing is the main focus for much of the fleet and during May and June fresh north shore P.E.I lobster can be bought in a fish market on the harbour wharves or directly off of the boats.

In the summer, this town is one of the Island's most popular destinations. On a warm summer evening, dozens of people can be found strolling the town's waterfront boardwalk, which overlooks the bay and fishing docks.

== Tourism ==
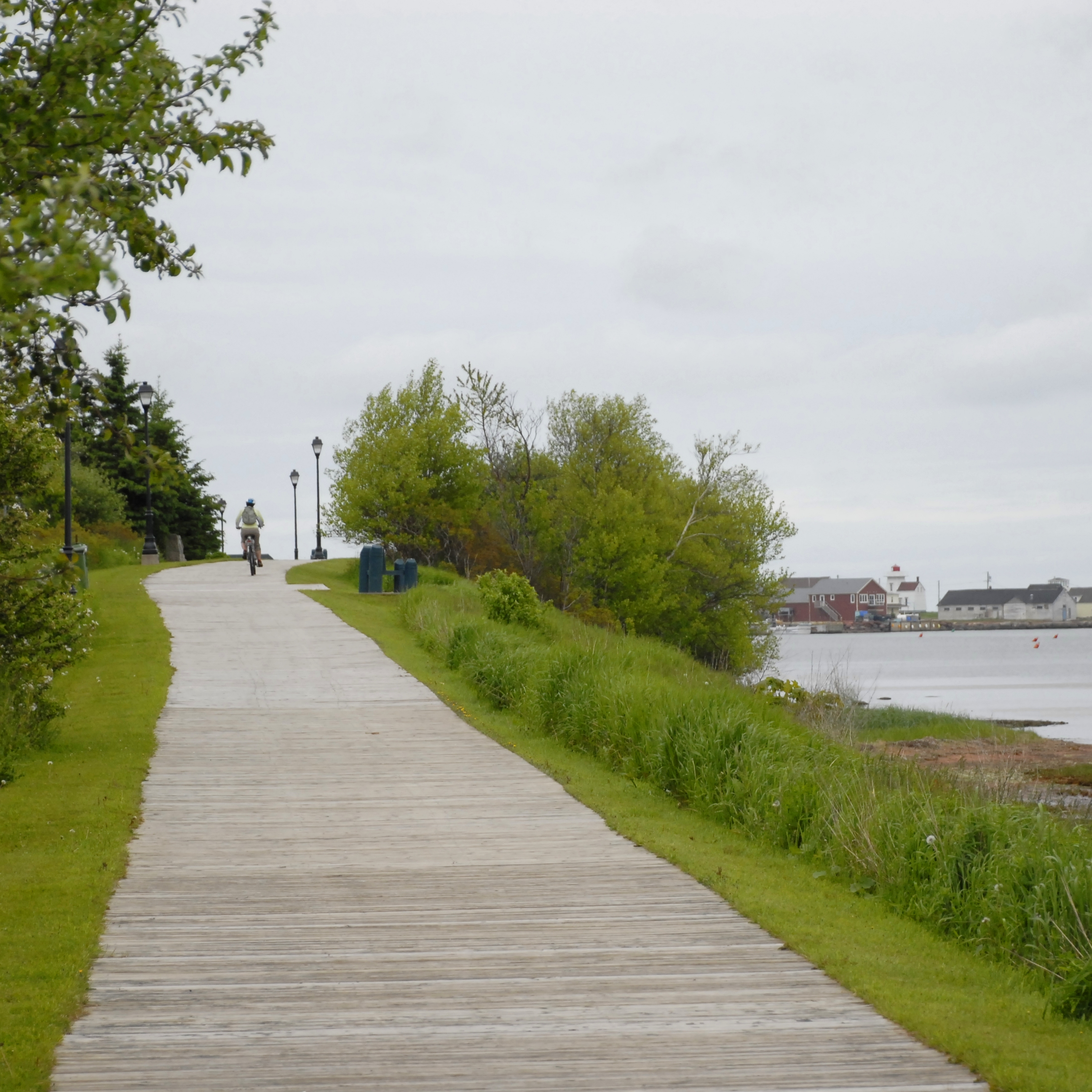
Boardwalk in Rustico. Tourism is an important part of the local economy.

North Rustico offers sea kayaking, cycling, walking, deep sea fishing, skating, boating, and hiking.

== Sports ==
North Star arena is home to a number of different hockey organizations, allowing players of all ages to exercise and enjoy the game of hockey.

== Climate ==
Similar to other Maritime provinces, Rustico's weather can be somewhat unpredictable. Winter temperatures run from -3 to -11 °C, Autumn temperatures run from 8-22 °C, Summer temperatures run around 20 °C, and Spring temperatures run from 8 to 22 degrees Celsius.

== Education ==
Gulf Shore Consolidated School provides public education for students from Kindergarten to grade 9. French language education is available at Ecole Saint-Augustin, located near South Rustico.
