= Breadalbane, Prince Edward Island =

- Community
- Breadalbane in Prince Edward Island
- Coordinates: 46°21′27″N 63°30′03″W
- Country: Canada
- Province: Prince Edward Island
- County: Queens
- Founded: 1991

Government
  - Type: Council
  - Mayor: Irene Novaczek
  - Deputy Mayor: Beverly Fowler
  - Councillors: Jessica Stewart; David Ross; Rebecca MacLeod; Kent MacLennan; Lisa MacLennan
  - Chief Administrative Officer: TBA

Area
  - Total: 12.67 km^{2} (4.89 sq mi)

Population (2021)
  - Total: 170
- Time zone: AST
  - Summer (DST): ADT
- Area code: 902
- NTS Map: 011L05
- GNBC Code: JBADXI
- Website: www.communityofbreadalbane.ca

Breadalbane (/brəˈdɔːlbæn/ brə-DAWL-ban) is a municipality that holds community status in Prince Edward Island, Canada. Located in Queens County, Prince Edward Island, its population as of 2021 is 170.

== Demographics ==
Federal census population history of Breadalbane
Year	Pop.	±%
1991	171	—
1996	171	+0.0%
2001	170	−0.6%
2006	172	+1.2%
2011	173	+0.6%
2016	167	−3.5%
2021	170	+1.8%
Source: Statistics Canada

In the 2021 Census of Population conducted by Statistics Canada, Breadalbane had a population of 170 living in 68 of its 74 total private dwellings, a change of 1.8% from its 2016 population of 167. With a land area of 12.67 km^{2} (4.89 sq mi), it had a population density of 13.4/km^{2} (34.8/sq mi) in 2021.

== Government ==
Breadalbane was incorporated as a municipality in 1991. Its name comes from an area in Scotland of the same name. The name "Breadalbane" means "The Upland of Alban". The Gaelic "Braghaid", meaning upper part, is found in Scottish place-names in the form of braid. "Alban" is the Gaelic name applied to the Northern Land. The Scots from Ireland, who brought Christianity to the West of Scotland in the early centuries, called the mountain range which separated them from Pictiand, "Druim-alban", or the backbone of Alban, and the region beyond it "Braighaid Alban".

The town was important as a local centre in the late 19th century. Several mills operated there, with the dam dismantled early in the 21st century.

Breadalbane has a community centre and a library and was the first station east of Emerald Junction on the Prince Edward Island Railway before the railroad was dismantled.

== Political history ==
James Kennedy, a Conservative, was first elected to the PEI Legislative Assembly in the general election of 1908 for 4th Prince. He was re-elected in the general election of 1912. Kennedy died while in office. Kennedy's brother Murdoch was also a MLA. The two brothers served concurrently from 1908 to 1915. Kennedy operated a general store and was a large exporter of farm produce. James Kennedy dies 23 April 1915

Murdoch Kennedy was born 25 March 1873 in Breadalbane. He married Margaret Davison Biggar and they had five children, Maude, Ray, Hazel, Erma and Ivan. He was first elected to the Legislative Assembly in a by-election on 19 December 1906 for 1st Queens. He was re-elected in the general elections of 1908, 1912, 1915, 1919, and 1923. In 1913, he resigned his Cabinet position because he disagreed with the government's support for the use of automobiles on public roads.

== Notable people ==
Though a small community, with a population of less than 200, Breadalbane is home to several prominent political and cultural figures. Residents, one-time residents, or frequent visitors include members of the PEI Legislative Assembly James Kennedy and Murdoch Kennedy, painter Hilda Woolnough, author Reshard Gool, potter Malcolm Stanley, film-maker John Hopkins, Gemini and Emmy Award-winning producer Cheryl Wagner, local merchant Ivan B. Kennedy, folk singer Allan Rankin, Geographer Hal Mills, Computer Scientist/Geographer Mike Neal, elder Elmer Stewart and Biologist Irené Novaczek.
