= North Wiltshire, Prince Edward Island =

North Wiltshire
- Community
- Municipality of North Wiltshire
- North Wiltshire in Prince Edward Island
- Coordinates: 46.301°N 63.333°W
- Country: Canada
- Province: Prince Edward Island
- County: Queens County
- Incorporated: 1974

Population (2021)
  - Total: 176
- Time zone: AST
  - Summer (DST): ADT
- Area code: 902

North Wiltshire is a municipality that holds community status in Prince Edward Island, Canada. It was incorporated in 1974.

== Demographics ==
Federal census population history of North Wiltshire
Year	Pop.	±%
2016	202	—
2021	176	−12.9%
Source: Statistics Canada

In the 2021 Census of Population conducted by Statistics Canada, North Wiltshire had a population of 176 living in 71 of its 73 total private dwellings, a change of −12.9% from its 2016 population of 202. With a land area of 12.43 km^{2} (4.80 sq mi), it had a population density of 14.2/km^{2} (36.7/sq mi) in 2021.

== See also ==
- List of communities in Prince Edward Island
