= Alexandra, Prince Edward Island =

Alexandra
- Rural municipality
- Alexandra in Prince Edward Island
- Coordinates: 46.196°N 63.019°W
- Country: Canada
- Province: Prince Edward Island
- County: Queens County
- Time zone: AST
  - Summer (DST): ADT
- Area code: 902

Alexandra is a rural municipality located in Queens County, Prince Edward Island, Canada.

== Demographics ==
Federal census population history of Alexandra
Year	Pop.	±%
2016	204	—
2021	252	+23.5%
Source: Statistics Canada

In the 2021 Census of Population conducted by Statistics Canada, Alexandra had a population of 252 living in 94 of its 97 total private dwellings, a change of 23.5% from its 2016 population of 204. With a land area of 10.35 km^{2} (4.00 sq mi), it had a population density of 24.3/km^{2} (63.1/sq mi) in 2021.
