= Queens County, Prince Edward Island =

County in Prince Edward Island, Canada

Coordinates: 46°17′N 63°15′W

Queens County
- County
- Location of Queens County in Prince Edward Island
- Incorporated Towns & Municipalities: Charlottetown (city), Cornwall (town), North Rustico (town), Stratford (town)
- Parishes: Greenville Parish, Hillsboro Parish, Charlotte Parish, Bedford Parish, St. John's Parish
- Townships and royalties: List: Queens Royalty, Lot 20, Lot 21, Lot 22, Lot 23, Lot 24, Lot 29, Lot 30, Lot 31, Lot 32, Lot 33, Lot 34, Lot 35, Lot 36, Lot 37, Lot 48, Lot 49, Lot 50, Lot 57, Lot 58, Lot 60, Lot 62, Lot 65, Lot 67

Area
  - Total: 2,020.48 km^{2} (780.11 sq mi)

Population (2021)
  - Total: 89,770
  - Density: 44.43/km^{2} (115.1/sq mi)
- Median Household income (2015): $63,770

Queens County is a county in the province of Prince Edward Island, Canada. It is the largest county in the province by population with 89,770 (2021) and land. Charlottetown is the county seat of Queens County, and is the largest city and the capital of Prince Edward Island.

== Geography ==
The county is located in the centre of Prince Edward Island, and the geography varies from relatively flat plains to rolling hills in the central interior lands known as the Bonshaw Hills. The coastline features sandstone cliffs and sandy beaches, with numerous sheltered bays on the Gulf of St. Lawrence and Northumberland Strait. The most important geographic feature of Queens County is the Hillsborough River and its extensive estuary, which almost cuts both the county and Prince Edward Island in half.

== History ==
Queens County was formed in 1765, and was named by Captain Samuel Holland in honour of Charlotte of Mecklenburg-Strelitz, then queen consort of the United Kingdom. Historically the economy of the county has been primarily agricultural, similar to rest of Prince Edward Island. Today, the county is characterised by urban sprawl extending from Charlottetown in the centre of the county is the region's most dominant feature; many rural parts of the county within the Charlottetown census agglomeration, and outside, are facing increased pressures to subdivide and develop into suburbs and exurbs. Stratford, a suburb of Charlottetown located south-east across the Hillsborough River, is the third-largest community in Prince Edward Island. Queens County is the only county in Prince Edward Island to have experienced population growth since 2011, with a change of +5.3% from 77,866 recorded in the Canada 2011 Census.

== Demographics ==
Historical populations Queen's County, PEI
Year	Pop.	±%
1871	42,651	—
1881	48,111	+12.8%
1891	45,975	−4.4%
1901	43,134	−6.2%
1911	38,313	−11.2%
1921	36,650	−4.3%
1931	37,391	+2.0%
1941	41,142	+10.0%
1991	67,196	+63.3%
1996	70,430	+4.8%
2001	71,619	+1.7%
2006	72,744	+1.6%
2011	77,866	+7.0%
2016	82,017	+5.3%

As a census division in the 2021 Census of Population conducted by Statistics Canada, Queens County had a population of 89,770 living in 37,232 of its 42,210 total private dwellings, a change of 9.7% from its 2016 population of 81,843. With a land area of 1,987.32 km^{2} (767.31 sq mi), it had a population density of 45.2/km^{2} (117.0/sq mi) in 2021.

== Transportation ==
=== Major highways ===
- Route 1 (TCH)
- Route 2
- Route 5
- Route 6
- Route 7
- Route 9
- Route 13
- Route 15
- Route 19
- Route 19A
- Route 25

== Railways ==
Currently closed

== Municipalities ==
Cities

- Charlottetown

Towns

- Cornwall
- North Rustico
- Stratford

Municipalities

- Afton
- Alexandra
- Belfast
- Bonshaw
- Brackley
- Breadalbane
- Clyde River
- Covehead
- Crapaud
- Darlington
- Hampshire
- Hazelbrook
- Hunter River
- Kingston
- Meadowbank
- Miltonvale Park
- Mount Stewart
- New Haven-Riverdale
- North Shore
- North Wiltshire
- Resort Municipality
- Union Road
- Victoria
- Warren Grove
- West Covehead
- West River
- York

Unincorporated Communities

- Brookvale
- Donagh
- Long River
- Marshfield
- Orwell
- Watervale

Indian reserves

- Rocky Point 3
- Scotchfort 4

== See also ==
- Royal eponyms in Canada
