= List of counties of Prince Edward Island =

Counties of Prince Edward Island
- Location: Province of Prince Edward Island
- Number: 3
- Populations: 18,327 (Kings) – 89,770 (Queens)
- Areas: 1,687.58 km^{2} (Kings) – 2,006.27 km^{2} (Prince)
- Government: County government (defunct)
- Subdivisions: Parishes, townships, municipalities

The Canadian province of Prince Edward Island has three counties that have historically been used as administrative divisions for the provincial government, and prior to Confederation (in 1873), the colonial government.

The current system of land division in Prince Edward Island, including its three counties, dates to a series of surveys undertaken in 1764–65 by Captain Samuel Holland of the British Army's Corps of Royal Engineers. Holland's survey saw the island divided into the three counties, each of which had a "royalty" (or shire town) as a county seat. The rest of the county outside the royalty was sub-divided into parishes for the Church of England, measuring approximately 60,000 acres (240 km^{2}); the parishes were further sub-divided into townships measuring approximately 20,000 acres (81 km^{2}).

The counties are no longer used as administrative boundaries for the provincial government; however, they continue to be used as census divisions by Statistics Canada for statistical purposes in administering the Canadian census.

County	County seat (current)	County seat (historical)	Established	Population (2021)	Population (2016)	Change	Land area (km^{2})	Population density (per km^{2})	Map
Kings	Georgetown	Kings Royalty	1765	18,327	17,154	+6.8%	1,687.58	10.9	
Queens	Charlottetown	Queens Royalty	1765	89,770	81,843	+9.7%	1,987.32	45.2	
Prince	Summerside	Prince Royalty	1765	46,234	43,910	+5.3%	2,006.27	23.0	
Total counties	—	—	—	154,331	142,907	+8.0%	5,681.17	27.2	—

== See also ==
- Administrative divisions of Canada
