= List of shipwrecks in December 1872 =

The list of shipwrecks in December 1872 includes ships sunk, foundered, grounded, or otherwise lost during December 1872.

== 1 December ==
List of shipwrecks: 1 December 1872
| Ship | State | Description |
|---|---|---|
| Amanda | Norway | The schooner was abandoned in the North Sea 30 nautical miles (56 km) west south west of Lindesnes. Her crew were rescued by Impe (Russia). Amanda was on a voyage from Peterhead, Aberdeenshire, United Kingdom to Mandal. |
| Charles H. Moller | United States | The schooner foundered off Sandy Hook, New Jersey with the loss of four of her seven crew. Survivors were rescued by the fishing smack Lewis Blackford (United States). Charles H. Moller was on a voyage from Philadelphia, Pennsylvania to New York. |
| Comet | United Kingdom | The ship was driven ashore at Bangor, County Down. She was on a voyage from Belfast, County Antrim to Liverpool, Lancashire. |
| Durette | United Kingdom | The ship was driven ashore at Fredrikshavn, Denmark. She was on a voyage from Hartlepool, County Durham to "Lybeck". |
| Ebenezer | United Kingdom | The lugger was driven ashore at Lowestoft, Suffolk. Her crew were rescued. |
| Inlia | United Kingdom | The ship was abandoned in a waterlogged condition. Her crew were rescued. She was on a voyage from Quebec City, Canada to Liverpool, Lancashire. |
| John Robinson | United Kingdom | The barque was wrecked on Bornholm, Denmark. Her crew were rescued. She was on a voyage from Kronstadt, Russia to Hartlepool, County Durham. |
| Laura | Denmark | The schooner collided with Neptunus (Denmark) and foundered south of Hals. Her crew were rescued. Laura was on a voyage from Newcastle upon Tyne, Northumberland, United Kingdom to Horsens. |
| Lena | United Kingdom | The steamship either struck a wreck or ran aground 20 nautical miles (37 km) off Aarhus, Denmark. She put into Aarhus in a sinking condition. |
| Nordstjernen | Sweden | The ship was driven ashore at Fredrikshavn. She was on a voyage from Leith, Lothian, United Kingdom to Kiel, Germany. |
| Severn | United Kingdom | The ship sprang a leak and was beached at Porthdinllaen, Caernarfonshire. She was on a voyage from Cardiff, Glamorgan to Strangford, County Antrim. |

== 2 December ==
List of shipwrecks: 2 December 1872
| Ship | State | Description |
|---|---|---|
| Fanny Palmer | United Kingdom | The brigantine was driven ashore and wrecked at Greystones, County Wicklow. She was on a voyage from Youghal, County Cork to Cardiff, Glamorgan. |
| Fortunato | Italy | The brig was wrecked on the Galloper or the Goodwin Sands, Kent, United Kingdom with the loss of five of the twelve people on board. Survivors were rescued by the schooner Betsey (United Kingdom). Fortunato was on a voyage from Newcastle upon Tyne, Northumberland, United Kingdom to Genoa. |
| Germania | United Kingdom | The steamship was driven ashore at Terneuzen, Zeeland, Netherlands. She was on a voyage from London to Antwerp, Belgium. |
| Hipparchus | United Kingdom | The ship was sighted off Cape Henry, Virginia whilst on a voyage from Baltimore, Maryland to Queenstown, County Cork. No further trace, presumed foundered with the loss of all hands. |
| Jenny Lemelin | United Kingdom | The ship sank in the Atlantic Ocean. Her crew were rescued by Temerario (Italy). Jenny Lemelin was on a voyage from Swansea, Glamorgan to Valparaíso, Chile. |
| Judithe | Denmark | The schooner was abandoned in the North Sea. She was on a voyage from Charleston, South Carolina, United States to Stege. |
| Mary Salter | United Kingdom | The ship was driven ashore at Larne, County Antrim. |
| Oskar II | Sweden | The ship was driven ashore at "Wiken". |
| Peace | United Kingdom | The ship struck the Runnel Stone, Cornwall and was lost. Her crew were rescued. She was on a voyage from Truro, Cornwall to Cork. |

== 3 December ==
List of shipwrecks: 3 December 1872
| Ship | State | Description |
|---|---|---|
| Annie Albert | France | The brig was driven ashore and wrecked near the Corsewall Lighthouse, Wigtownshire, United Kingdom and was abandoned by her crew. She was on a voyage from Troon, Ayrshire, United Kingdom to Bayonne, Basses-Pyrénées. |
| Aurora | Italy | The ship was wrecked at Santa Lucia, Naples. |
| Camilla | United Kingdom | The schooner ran aground and sank at the mouth of the River Mersey. Her crew were rescued. She was on a voyage from Newquay, Cornwall to Runcorn, Cheshire. |
| Città di Genova | Regia Marina | The transport ship was severely damaged in a storm at Naples. |
| City of Manchester | Canada | The ship was abandoned in a waterlogged condition. Her 24 crew were rescued by Constance (United Kingdom). City of Manchester was on a voyage from Quebec City to Greenock, Renfrewshire, United Kingdom. |
| Fingal | United Kingdom | The steamship ran aground near Honfleur, Manche, France. She broke in two the next day. |
| Gratitude | United Kingdom | The smack collided with the steamship Alert (United Kingdom) and sank in the North Sea off Scarborough, Yorkshire with the loss of two of her crew. |
| Giuscardo | Regia Marina | The Ruggeiro-class frigate was driven ashore at Naples. |
| Harbinger | United Kingdom | The barque was run into by the steamship Fairy Queen (United Kingdom) and was beached in the River Thames at London. |
| Hypolite | France | The schooner ran aground on the Paternoster Rocks, on the north coast of Jersey Channel Islands and was wrecked. Her crew were rescued. She was on a voyage from Boulogne, Pas-de-Calais to Saint-Malo, Ille-et-Vilaine. |
| Imperator Alexander II | Russia | The ship was abandoned in the Atlantic Ocean. Her crew were rescued by the barque La Plata (Brazil). Imperator Alexander II was on a voyage from New York, United States to Queenstown, County Cork, United Kingdom. |
| Indian Queen | United Kingdom | The ship was abandoned in the Atlantic Ocean with some loss of life. Survivors were rescued by Don Guillermo (United Kingdom). |
| Italia | Regia Marina | The frigate was severely damaged in a storm at Naples. |
| Jorgeuse | Portugal | The ship foundered off Madeira. Her crew were rescued. She was on a voyage from São Miguel Island, Azores to Pernambuco, Brazil. |
| Louisa | United Kingdom | The barque capsized in the Atlantic Ocean 50 nautical miles (93 km) south south west of The Lizard, Cornwall with the loss of four of her seventeen crew. Survivors were rescued on 13 December by the brig Friede (Sweden). Louisa was on a voyage from Quebec City to Sunderland, County Durham. Louisa was taken into Guernsey, Channel Islands in a waterlogged condition on 16 December. |
| Magdala | Canada | The ship was driven ashore. She was on a voyage from Saint John, New Brunswick to Havana, Cuba. She was refloated and taken into Yarmouth, Nova Scotia in a leaky condition. |
| Nellie, and an unnamed vessel | Flag unknown | The steamship Nellie (United Kingdom) ran into a barque in the English Channel off Folkestone, Kent, United Kingdom. Nellie was on a voyage from Newport, Monmouthshire to Lubawka, Courland Governorate. She was assisted into Dover, Kent in a severely damaged condition. The barque sank, all hands presumed lost. |
| Redwing | United Kingdom | The brig was driven ashore at Sunderland. Her crew were rescued by rocket apparatus. She was on a voyage from Sunderland to London. |
| Samson | United Kingdom | The tug collided with the Mersey Ferry Woodside (United Kingdom) and sank in the River Mersey with the loss of two of her crew. |
| Terribile | Regia Marina | The Formidable-class ironclad was driven ashore at Naples. |
| Una | United Kingdom | The brig was driven onto the Longscar Rocks, on the coast of County Durham. |
| Unnamed | Greece | The brig was driven ashore at Portici, Italy. |
| Two unnamed vessels | Flags unknown | The ships were driven ashore at Portici. |
| Eleven unnamed vessels | Flags unknown | The ships were driven ashore and wrecked at Pozzuoli, Italy. |
| Several unnamed vessels | Flags unknown | The ships were driven ashore and wrecked at Salerno, Italy. |

== 4 December ==
List of shipwrecks: 4 December 1872
| Ship | State | Description |
|---|---|---|
| Captain Cook | United Kingdom | The steamship ran aground on the Stoney Binks, in the North Sea off the mouth of the Humber and was abandoned. Her crew survived. She was on a voyage from Whitby, Yorkshire to London. Captain Cook floated off and drove ashore at Cleethorpes, Lincolnshire in a waterlogged condition. She was refloated on 5 December and towed into Grimsby, Lincolnshire by the tug Victor (United Kingdom). |
| Caroline Coventry | United Kingdom | The ship was abandoned in the Atlantic Ocean. Her crew were rescued by Boetsche (Flag unknown). Caroline Coventry was on a voyage from New York, United States to London. |
| Cæsar | United Kingdom | The brig was driven ashore and wrecked west of Gravelines, Nord, France with the loss of five of her six crew. She was on a voyage from London to Dunkirk, Nord. |
| C. C. Griswold | United States | The schooner foundered in Lake Michigan with the loss of all hands. |
| Fashion | United Kingdom | The smack collided with a Yorkshire Billyboy and sank off the Gunfleet Lightship ( Trinity House). Her crew were rescued by the smack Snowdrop(United Kingdom). |
| Harmony | United Kingdom | The schooner was run down and sunk in the Bristol Channel by the steamship Zembro (United Kingdom). |
| Julia | United Kingdom | The barque was abandoned in the Atlantic Ocean. Her crew were rescued by the schooner Kitty Glidden (United Kingdom). Julia came ashore in Letter Mullen Bay, County Galway on 7 January 1873 and was wrecked. |
| Jupiter | United States | The barque foundered in Lake Michigan with the loss of all hands. |
| Louis Joseph | France | The brig collided with the steamship Thomas Adam (United Kingdom) and sank in the English Channel off Dover, Kent, United Kingdom. Her crew were rescued by Thomas Adam. Louis Joseph was on a voyage from Phillippeville, Algeria to Dunkirk, Nord. |
| Margarita | Netherlands | The galiot was driven ashore and wrecked west of Gravelines. She was on a voyage from Stettin, Germany to Newport, Monmouthshire, United Kingdom. |
| Maria Cecile | France | The ship was lost off Isigny-sur-Mer, Calvados. |
| Maud | United Kingdom | The ship collided with another vessel and sank in the English Channel off Portland, Dorset. Her crew were rescued. she was on a voyage from Montreal, Quebec, Canada to Aberdeen. |
| Middlesex | United States | The schooner foundered in Lake Michigan. Her crew were rescued. |
| Nathanial D. Carlisle | United Kingdom | The barque was driven ashore at Rio do Fogo, Brazil. Her crew were rescued. She was on a voyage from Montreal to Montevideo, Uruguay. |
| Rosina | United Kingdom | The barque was abandoned in the Atlantic Ocean. Her crew were rescued by Thomas Lee (United Kingdom). Rosina was on a voyage from Quebec City, Canada to Dartmouth, Devon. She came ashore and was wrecked near "Portnas", County Donegal on 14 December. |
| Saturn | United States | The barque foundered in Lake Michigan with the loss of all hands. |
| Sphinx | United Kingdom | The steamship departed from Gibraltar for London. No further trace, presumed foundered with the loss of all hands. |
| Susanna | United Kingdom | The brigantine collided with a barque in the North Sea off the coast of Yorkshire and was severely damaged. She was on a voyage from Sunderland, County Durham to Great Yarmouth, Norfolk. She was towed into the River Tyne by the paddle tug Sea Belle (United Kingdom). |
| War Spirit | United Kingdom | The full-rigged ship was towed into Vigo, Spain in a waterlogged condition by the steamship Atlantic (United Kingdom). |
| W. O. Brown | United Kingdom | The schooner foundered in Lake Michigan with the loss of all hands. |
| Unnamed | United Kingdom | The schooner was driven ashore and wrecked near Gravelines, Nord with the loss of all but one of her crew. |
| Unnamed | France | The pilot boat was run down and sunk at Calais by the steamship Breeze (United Kingdom) with the loss of two of the three people on board. |
| Unnamed | United Kingdom | The Yorkshire Billyboy was driven ashore at Calais with the loss of three lives. |

== 5 December ==
List of shipwrecks: 5 December 1872
| Ship | State | Description |
|---|---|---|
| Ant | United Kingdom | The brig was wrecked on the Sizewell Bank, in the North Sea off the coast of Suffolk. Her crew were rescued. She was on a voyage from South Shields, County Durham to London. |
| Amalia | (Russian Empire) Grand Duchy of Finland | The barque ran aground on the Gunfleet Sand, in the North Sea off the coast of Essex, United Kingdom. She was on a voyage from Skutskär, Sweden to London. She was refloated and taken in Harwich, Essex in a waterlogged condition. |
| Batavia | United Kingdom | The ship caught fire in the Atlantic Ocean and was abandoned. Her crew were rescued by Norseman (United Kingdom). Batavia was on a voyage from Buenos Aires, Argentina to London. |
| Good Intent | United Kingdom | The ship ran aground on the Gunfleet Sand. She was on a voyage from Newcastle upon Tyne, Northumberland to London. She was refloated but sank off the Wallet Sand. Her crew were rescued. |
| Hermes | Norway | The brig was driven ashore and wrecked at Rye, Sussex, United Kingdom with the loss of seven of her eight crew. She was on a voyage from Rouen, Seine-Inférieure, France to Stavanger. |
| Kjoge | Denmark | The barque was run into by the steamship Nelly (United Kingdom) and was assisted into Ramsgate, Kent, United Kingdom in a waterlogged condition. |
| Marguerite | United Kingdom | The steamship ran aground on the Tinkerplat, off the coast of Zeeland, Netherlands. She was on a voyage from Antwerp, Belgium to London. She was refloated but then ran aground on the Springgerplaat. |
| Maria Theresa | Italy | The brig collided with a schooner and was beached at Prawle Point, Devon, United Kingdom. Her crew were rescued. |
| Mary Austin | United Kingdom | The steamship was driven ashore at Dunkirk, Nord, France. Her crew were rescued. She was on a voyage from Leith, Lothian to Dunkirk. |
| Mary Celeste | Canada | The brigantine was discovered abandoned in the Atlantic Ocean off the Azores. |
| Ocean Star | United Kingdom | The schooner ran aground at Thurso, Caithness. She was on a voyage from Thurso to Granton, Lothian. |
| Othello | United States | The ship was driven ashore at Réville, Manche, France. She was on a voyage from Havre de Grâce, Seine-Inférieure, France to Savannah, Georgia. She was refloated on 19 January 1873 and towed into Cherbourg, Manche by the steamship Princess (United Kingdom). |
| Stafford | United States | The brig was driven ashore at Salerno, Italy. Her crew were rescued. |
| Thetis | Denmark | The brigantine collided with the barque Augusta (Norway) and was abandoned 30 nautical miles (56 km) off the Eddystone Lighthouse, Cornwall, United Kingdom. Her crew were rescued by Augusta. Thetis was on a voyage from Newcastle upon Tyne, Northumberland, United Kingdom to Porto, Portugal. |
| Thomas Haden | United Kingdom | The barque was wrecked on the Hinder Bank, in the North Sea off the coast of the Netherlands. Her crew were rescued. She was on a voyage from Sunderland, County Durham to Rotterdam, South Holland, Netherlands. |
| Wind's Eye | United Kingdom | The schooner collided with the cutter Faret (France) and sank in the North Sea off Cromer, Norfolk. Her crew were rescued by Kelter (Germany). Wind's Eye was on a voyage from Hull, Yorkshire to Great Yarmouth, Norfolk. |

== 6 December ==
List of shipwrecks: 6 December 1872
| Ship | State | Description |
|---|---|---|
| Albacore | United Kingdom | The barque was wrecked at Little Inagua, Bahamas. Her crew were rescued. |
| Bilboa | United Kingdom | The ship departed from South Shields, County Durham for the Nieuwe Diep. No further trace, presumed foundered with the loss of all hands. |
| Congress | United States | The schooner foundered in the Atlantic Ocean 60 nautical miles (110 km) south east of Rockport, Texas with the loss of all but two of her crew. Survivors were rescued by a Mexican vessel. She was on a voyage from Pensacola, Florida to Rockport. |
| Elwell | United Kingdom | The barque caught fire and was abandoned in the Strait of Magellan. Her fifteen crew took to a boat; only three of them were still alive on 14 March, when they were rescued by the steamship Tropic. Elwell was on a voyage from Cardiff, Glamorgan to Valparaíso, Cbile. |
| Favourite | United Kingdom | The ship ran aground on the Batten Reef, in the Cattewater. She was refloated and taken into Plymouth, Devon. |
| Friso | Netherlands | The ship was driven ashore at Hellevoetsluis, Zeeland. She was on a voyage from an English port to Rotterdam, South Holland. |
| Gazelle | United Kingdom | The ship ran aground on the Cross Sand, in the North Sea off the coast of Norfolk. She was on a voyage from Sunderland, County Durham to Honfleur, Manche, France. She was refloated and put into Harwich, Essex in a leaky condition. |
| George | United Kingdom | The ship was driven ashore at Ross, Northumberland. She was on a voyage from Granton, Lothian to London. |
| Ivanhoe | United Kingdom | The ship departed from Amble, Northumberland for Rotterdam, South Holland, Netherlands. No further trace, presumed foundered with the loss of all hands. |
| James W. Elwell | United Kingdom | The barque caught fire and was abandoned 200 nautical miles (370 km) off Cape Horn, Chile, consequently sinking. Her fifteen crew took to a boat; only three of them survived to be rescued ten weeks later by the steamship Tropic (United Kingdom). James W. Elwell was on a voyage from Cardiff, Glamorgan to Valparaíso, Chile. |
| Marchioness of Lorne | United Kingdom | The steamship was driven ashore on the Isle of Mull. |
| Norge | Norway | The ship was driven ashore at "Sodrenarker". She was on a voyage from a Swedish port to Antwerp, Belgium. She was refloated and taken into Copenhagen, Denmark. |
| Pizarro | United Kingdom | The ship departed from Boston, Massachusetts, United States for Liverpool, Lancashire. No further trace, presumed foundered with the loss of all hands. |
| Recompense | (United Kingdom of Great Britain and Ireland) Guernsey | The brig sank off Bognor Regis, Sussex. Her crew were rescued. She was on a voyage from Newcastle upon Tyne, Northumberland to Guernsey. |
| Reubens | United Kingdom | The steamship ran aground in the River Wear. She was refloated. |
| Scottish Maid | United Kingdom | The tug sank at Port Glasgow, Renfrewshire. The only crew member on board survived. |
| Twee Gebroeders | Netherlands | The schooner was wrecked near Larache, Morocco. She was on a voyage from London, United Kingdom to Larache. |
| Venture | United Kingdom | The schooner was driven ashore at Aberdeen. Her crew were rescued. |
| William and Thomas | United Kingdom | The ship was wrecked at Hythe, Kent. She was on a voyage from Grimsby, Lincolnshire to Rye, Sussex. |
| William Nelson | United Kingdom | The brigantine ran aground in the Loire downstream of Le Pellerin, Loire-Inférieure. |

== 7 December ==
List of shipwrecks: 7 December 1872
| Ship | State | Description |
|---|---|---|
| American Congress | United States | The ship departed from New York for London, United Kingdom. No further trace, presumed foundered with the loss of all hands. |
| Bertha von Borstel | Germany | The ship departed from West Hartlepool, County Durham, United Kingdom for Steinhausersiel. No further trace, presumed foundered with the loss of all hands. |
| Leo | United Kingdom | The ship departed from Sunderland, County Durham for Rotterdam, South Holland, Netherlands. No further trace, presumed foundered with the loss of all hands. |
| Soblomsten | Norway | The sloop was taken into New Hellesund in a derelict condition. |
| Wellington | United Kingdom | The schooner departed from Hartlepool, County Durham for Lowestoft, Suffolk. No further trace, presumed foundered with the loss of all hands. |

== 8 December ==
List of shipwrecks: 8 December 1872
| Ship | State | Description |
|---|---|---|
| Affo | United Kingdom | The brigantine was wrecked at Hartland Point, Devon with the loss of all four crew. |
| Amelia Augusta | France | The schooner foundered west of Strumble Head, Pembrokeshire, United Kingdom with the loss of at least three lives. |
| Ann and Elizabeth, or Mary Elizabeth | United Kingdom | The schooner foundered off New Brighton, Cheshire with the loss of all hands. |
| Audaz | United Kingdom | The ship was wrecked on "Bimmies Island". She was on a voyage from Matanzas, Cuba to Falmouth, Cornwall. |
| HMS Cambridge | Royal Navy | The first rate ship of the line was driven ashore at Plymouth, Devon. She was refloated the next day. |
| Eleanor | Canada | The barque ran aground off Cardiff, Glamorgan. All but one of her crew were taken off by the Penarth Lifeboat George Gay ( Royal National Lifeboat Institution). Her crew returned the next day, she was refloated and taken into Cardiff for repairs. |
| Eliza | United Kingdom | The brigantine was run into by an Italian vessel and driven ashore at Plymouth. Four of her eight crew were rescued by rocket apparatus, the others by the Plymouth Lifeboat Prince Consort ( Royal National Lifeboat Institution). Eliza was on a voyage from Blyth, Northumberland to Gibraltar. |
| Fleetwing | United Kingdom | The lugger was driven ashore at Great Yarmouth, Norfolk. Her crew were rescued. |
| Garibaldi | United Kingdom | The sloop was driven ashore and wrecked at Wimereux with the loss of two of her four crew. She was on a voyage from Poole, Dorset to Aylesford, Kent. |
| Gaspar Joseph | France | The schooner was wrecked on the Holm Sand, in the North Sea off the coast of Norfolk. Her crew were rescued. She was on a voyage from Hartlepool, County Durham, United Kingdom to the Charente. |
| Gracie | United Kingdom | The barque foundered off Penarth, Glamorgan with the loss of all but one of her crew. |
| Hope | United Kingdom | The collier was driven ashore and wrecked in Porteynon Bay. Her four crew survived. She was on a voyage from Cork to Swansea, Glamorgan. |
| Hope | United Kingdom | The brig foundered off Freshwater, Isle of Wight with the loss of all ten crew. She was on a voyage from the River Tyne to Lisbon, Portugal. |
| Ibis | United Kingdom | The brig was abandoned in the North Sea. Her crew were rescued by Leda (United Kingdom). Ibis was on a voyage from South Shields, County Durham to Rochester, Kent. She was subsequently towed into Great Yarmouth by a tug. |
| Jane | United Kingdom | The Thames barge was driven ashore 4 nautical miles (7.4 km) from Lowestoft, Suffolk. Her crew were rescued. She was on a voyage from Sunderland, County Durham to Calais, France. |
| J. C. Bolebohe | United Kingdom | The ship was driven ashore on "Shipper Island", Ceylon. Her crew were rescued. |
| Jessie | United Kingdom | The schooner was driven ashore and wrecked at Islandmagee, County Antrim. Her crew were rescued. She was on a voyage from Larne, County Antrim to Glasgow, Renfrewshire. |
| Jules Désiré | France | The schooner was driven ashore at the Fort de la Crèche, Wimereux, Pas-de-Calais and was abandoned by her crew. She was on a voyage from Middlesbrough, Yorkshire, United Kingdom to Nantes, Loire-Inférieure. |
| Lavinia | United Kingdom | The schooner departed from Fécamp for Dieppe, Seine-Inférieure, France. No further trace, presumed foundered in the English Channel with the loss of all hands. |
| Leborne | United Kingdom | The barque ran aground on the Newcombe Sand, in the North Sea off the coast of Suffolk and sank. Her crew survived. She was on a voyage from Sunderland to New York, United States. |
| Margareta | Denmark | The galiot foundered in the North Sea. Her crew were rescued by Leda (United Kingdom). |
| Margaret and Ann | United Kingdom | The barque was driven ashore at the Mumbles. Margaret and Ann was on a voyage from Quebec City, Canada to Swansea. She was later refloated and take into Swansea. |
| Mersey | United Kingdom | The steam Mersey Flat collided with Great Western (United Kingdom) and sank in the River Mersey. |
| Mystery | United Kingdom | The cutter was in collision with the schooner John Pearce (United Kingdom) and sank in the Bristol Channel off Penarth. All fourteen people on board were rescued by John Pearce. Mystery was on a voyage from Flat Holm to Weston-super-Mare, Somerset. |
| Natalia | United Kingdom | The ship was sighted whilst on a voyage from the River Tyne to Bombay, India. No further trace, presumed foundered with the loss of 24 crew. |
| Nor | Norway | The ship was driven ashore. She was on a voyage from Vyborg, Grand Duchy of Finland to Grimsby, Lincolnshire, United Kingdom. She was refloated and taken into Mandal in a leaky condition. |
| Omega | United Kingdom | The ship foundered off the coast of County Kerry. |
| Prince Consort | Royal National Lifeboat Institution | The lifeboat struck a rock in the Cattewater whilst going to the assistance of Eliza (United Kingdom and was severely damaged. |
| Rose Bud | United Kingdom | The ship departed from Leith, Lothian for Boulogne-sur-Mer, Pas-de-Calais, France. No further trace, presumed foundered with the loss of all hands. |
| Sir Charles Napier | United Kingdom | The Thames barge sank in the River Crouch. Her crew were rescued. She was on a voyage from London to Harwich, Essex. |
| Tailard, | France | The brig collided with the schooner Ann Williams (United Kingdom) and sank. Her crew survived, two were rescued by Ann Williams. Tailard was on a voyage from Troon, Ayrshire, United Kingdom to Marseille, Bouches-du-Rhône. |
| Thames | United Kingdom | The barque was driven ashore at Richibucto, New Brunswick, Canada. She was on a voyage from an English port to Richibucto. She was consequently condemned. |
| Trois Anges | France | The lugger was driven ashore at Plymouth. Her crew were rescued by rocket apparatus. |
| Volante | United Kingdom | The steamship was driven ashore near Pregel, Germany. She was on a voyage from Pillau to Königsberg. |
| Wallace | United Kingdom | The brig capsized in the Bristol Channel with the loss of all hands. |
| Widdington | United Kingdom | The brig foundered at Great Yarmouth. Her crew survived. |
| Two unnamed vessels | United Kingdom | The Thames barges sank in the River Thames with the loss of all hands. |

== 9 December ==
List of shipwrecks: 9 December 1872
| Ship | State | Description |
|---|---|---|
| Antine Zorenz | Germany | The brig was driven ashore near Plymouth, Devon, United Kingdom. She was refloated on 11 December. |
| Auspicious | United Kingdom | The ship was driven ashore on Long Nose Point. She was on a voyage from Par, Cornwall to Antwerp, Belgium. |
| Bristol Packet | United Kingdom | The trow was driven ashore in the River Avon. |
| Canada | Canada | The barque foundered off Penarth, Glamorgan, United Kingdom with the loss of all but one of her crew. |
| Choice | United Kingdom | The ship ran aground and sank off Holmpton, Yorkshire. Her crew survived. |
| Commercien | Netherlands | The ship was abandoned at sea. Her crew were rescued. She was on a voyage from Fredrikstad, Norway to Dordrecht, South Holland. |
| Curaçao Packet | Netherlands | The schooner was driven ashore near Plymouth. Her crew survived. She was on a voyage from Amsterdam, North Holland to Curaçao. |
| Dyreborg | Denmark | The schooner ran aground at Bilbao, Spain. Her crew were rescued. |
| Earl of Moray | United Kingdom | The schooner ran aground off Casablanca, Morocco and was wrecked. |
| Echo | Norway | The ship was driven ashore at Hellevoetsluis, Zeeland, Netherlands. |
| Edith | Canada | The full-rigged ship was driven into the barque Gimle (Norway and the brig Hope (United Kingdom) in Plymouth Sound and was severely damaged. |
| Eliza | United Kingdom | The brigantine was driven onto the Batten Reef, off Plymouth and was wrecked. Four of her eight crew were rescued by rocket apparatus and four by the Plymouth Lifeboat Prince Consort ( Royal National Lifeboat Institution). |
| Excel | United Kingdom | The schooner was abandoned in the English Channel off Selsey Bill, Sussex. Her five crew were rescued by the Selsey Lifeboat Four Sisters ( Royal National Lifeboat Institution). |
| Exhibition | United Kingdom | The ship was driven ashore at Clee Ness, Lincolnshire. She was on a voyage from South Shields, County Durham to London. She was refloated and taken into Grimsby, Lincolnshire in a leaky condition. |
| Fearful | United Kingdom | The brig was wrecked on the Batten Reef, in the Cattewater. Her eight crew were rescued by the Plymouth Lifeboat Prince Consort ( Royal National Lifeboat Institution). She was later refloated. |
| Fijenoord | Netherlands | The ship ran aground at Hellevoetsluis. |
| Flanders | United Kingdom | The schooner was abandoned off the Scroby Sands, Norfolk. Her crew were rescued. |
| Fratelli Baghino | Italy | The brig was wrecked on the Batten Reef with the loss of a crew member. Survivors were rescued by the Coastguard using rocket apparatus. Fratelli Baghino was on a voyage from Paysandú, Uruguay to Plymouth. |
| General Havelock | India | The steamship struck a sunken rock and sank at Vingora. She was on a voyage from Cochin to Calcutta. |
| Giovanna | Italy | The ship was driven against the quayside and was damaged at Liverpool, Lancashire. |
| Gleaner | United Kingdom | The ship was driven ashore at Liverpool. |
| Goeree Lightship | Netherlands | The lightship was driven ashore on the coast of Zeeland. |
| Gracia | United Kingdom | The barque foundered off Penarth. |
| Great Britain | United Kingdom | The ship collided with Crystaline (United Kingdom) and was driven ashore and severely damaged at Waterloo, Lancashire. She was on a voyage from Liverpool to "Dobay". She was refloated and taken into Birkenhead, Cheshire. |
| Hector | United Kingdom | The brigantine was driven ashore at Sea Palling, Norfolk. Her six crew were rescued by the Palling Lifeboat. She was on a voyage from Newcastle upon Tyne, Northumberland to London. |
| Hero | United Kingdom | The ship was wrecked at Winterton-on-Sea, Norfolk. Her crew were rescued. She was on a voyage from Hartlepool, County Durham to London. |
| Isabella | United Kingdom | The ship was driven ashore and wrecked on South Ronaldshay, Orkney Islands. |
| James Mason, and Llanelly | United Kingdom | The steamship collided James Mason with the steam coaster Llanelly (United Kingdom) in the Crosby Channel and was beached at Crosby, Lancashire. Her crew survived. She was on a voyage from Liverpool to Pomaron, Portugal or vice versa. Llanelly was severely damaged. She was taken into Liverpool. |
| Jane | United Kingdom | The brig foundered in the North Sea. All seven people on board were rescued by the smack Eagle (United Kingdom). Jane was on a voyage from Sunderland, County Durham to Rotterdam, South Holland, Netherlands. |
| Jane and Eliza | United Kingdom | The ship was beached at Porthdinllaen, Caernarfonshire. She was on a voyage from Southampton, Hampshire of Londonderry. |
| Jeune Desiré | France | The ship was wrecked off Boulogne, Pas-de-Calais. She was on a voyage from Middlesbrough, Yorkshire to Basse-Indre, Loire-Inférieure. |
| Leburna | Norway | The ship barque was wrecked on the Newcombe Sand, in the North Sea off the coast of Norfolk. Her crew were rescued. She was on a voyage from Sunderland to New York, United States. |
| Lorenz | Germany | The brigantine was driven ashore near Plymouth. All on board were rescued by the Coastguard. |
| Louise | United Kingdom | The ship was driven ashore at Liverpool. |
| Margaret Tod | Germany | The steamship was driven ashore near Lemvig, Norway. Her crew were rescued. She was on a voyage from Middlesbrough to Stettin. |
| Maria | France | The schooner was run down and sunk off Penarth by the steamship Stamford (United Kingdom). |
| Marie | United Kingdom | The ship was driven ashore at Long Nose Point. |
| Marion | United Kingdom | The ship was driven ashore near Weston-super-Mare, Somerset. She was on a voyage from Quebec City, Canada to Cardiff, Glamorgan. |
| Mary Eleanor | United Kingdom | The brig was abandoned in the North Sea. Her seven crew were rescued by the barque Ortive (United Kingdom) before she foundered. Mary Eleanor was on a voyage from the River Tyne to Cork. |
| Melpomene | United Kingdom | The ship was driven onto the Pluckington Bank, in Liverpool Bay. She was on a voyage from Liverpool to Melbourne, Victoria. |
| Mersey | United Kingdom | The steam flat collided with Great Western (United Kingdom) and sank at Liverpool with the loss of two lives. |
| Ocean Monarch | United Kingdom | The schooner was driven ashore and wrecked in St Brides Bay. Her crew survived. She was on a voyage from Sydney to "Fiddown". |
| Ornen | Norway | The brig was driven ashore near Plymouth. Her crew survived. Ornen was on a voyage from the Gulf of Bothnia to Seville, Spain. She was refloated on 13 December and taken into Sutton Harbour, Devon. |
| Patria | Sweden | The ship departed from Pensacola, Florida, United States for London. No further trace, presumed foundered with the loss of all hands. |
| Queen Victoria | United Kingdom | The schooner foundered in the North Sea 50 nautical miles (93 km) east by south of the Newarp Lightship ( Trinity House). Her crew were rescued. She was on a voyage from Plymouth to Hull, Yorkshire |
| Ravensdown | United Kingdom | The steamship was driven ashore at New Romney, Kent. She was refloated and taken into Dover, Kent. |
| Rothesay | United Kingdom | The brig collided with the schooner Rival (United Kingdom). Three of her crew were rescued by Rival. Rothesay was reported missing. |
| San Juan | United States | The ship was driven ashore at Hellevoetsluis. |
| Saulus | United Kingdom | The ship was driven ashore at Bristol. She was on a voyage from New York to Gloucester. |
| St. Louis | United States | The steamship sprang a leak and foundered in the Gulf of Mexico 170 nautical miles (310 km) off the mouth of the Mississippi River. Her crew were rescued. She was on a voyage from New Orleans, Louisiana to New York. |
| Stralsund | Germany | The brig was wrecked on the Kimmeridge Ledges, in the English Channel off the coast of Dorset, United Kingdom. Her fifteen crew were rescued by the Swanage Lifeboat Mary Heape ( Royal National Lifeboat Institution). Stralsund was on a voyage from New York, United States to Hamburg or vice versa. |
| Superbus | Austria-Hungary | The barque was driven ashore at Bristol. |
| Susan Gray | United Kingdom | The ship was abandoned off the Scroby Sands. Her crew were rescued. She was on a voyage from South Shields, County Durham to Rotterdam. |
| Thalia | United Kingdom | The brig foundered in the North Sea off Great Yarmouth. Her crew were rescued. |
| Theopholite Marie | France | The barque was driven ashore and wrecked at Rame Head, Cornwall, United Kingdom with the loss of all twelve crew. |
| Thomas A. Allen | United States | The steamship struck a submerged object and sank in the Mississippi River at Memphis, Tennessee with the loss of two of her crew. |
| Thomas Gales | United Kingdom | The brig foundered in the North Sea 30 nautical miles (56 km) east of the Dudgeon Lightship ( Trinity House)' with the loss of all seven crew. |
| Tinto | United Kingdom | The barque was wrecked on the Down End Rock, off Bideford, Devon with the loss of eight of the 24 people on board. She was on a voyage from Quebec City, Canada to Cardiff, Glamorgan. |
| Tomas | Spain | The brig ran aground on the Great Burbo Bank, in Liverpool Bay. She was on a voyage from Liverpool to Havana, Cuba. She was refloated and taken into Birkenhead for repairs. |
| Travancore | United Kingdom | The ship was driven ashore in Walton Bay. She was on a voyage from Cardiff to Trinidad. |

== 10 December ==
List of shipwrecks: 10 December 1872
| Ship | State | Description |
|---|---|---|
| Abergeldie | United Kingdom | The barque was abandoned in the Atlantic Ocean. All sixteen people on board were rescued by the full-rigged ship Acadia (United Kingdom). Abergeldie was on a voyage from Montreal, Quebec, Canada to Liverpool, Lancashire. |
| Bee | United Kingdom | The ship was driven ashore in the Nieuwe Diep. She was on a voyage from Grangemouth, Stirlingshire to Rotterdam, South Holland, Netherlands. |
| Choice | United Kingdom | The schooner was abandoned in the North Sea 18 nautical miles (33 km) east south east of the Newarp Lightship ( Trinity House). Her crew were rescued by the steamship Edgar (United Kingdom). Choice was on a voyage from Hartlepool, County Durham to London. |
| Dorothea | United Kingdom | The ship foundered in the North Sea off the mouth of the Humber. Her crew were rescued. She was on a voyage from Middlesbrough Yorkshire to London. |
| Eleda | Norway | The barque was driven ashore on Coquet Island, Northumberland, United Kingdom. She was refloated and sailed for Grangemouth, Stirlingshire, United Kingdom. |
| Emma Jane | United Kingdom | The ship foundered off Penarth, Glamorgan with the loss of all but one of those on board. She was on a voyage from Kinsale, County Cork to Newport, Monmouthshire. |
| Falcon | United Kingdom | The ship was driven ashore on Terschelling, Friesland, Netherlands. Her crew were rescued but her captain was reported missing. She was on a voyage from Amsterdam, North Holland, Netherlands to Portsmouth, Hampshire. |
| Friendship | United Kingdom | The schooner was wrecked on the East Barrow Sand, in the North Sea off the coast of Essex. She was on a voyage from Goole, Yorkshire to London. |
| Glencoe | United Kingdom | The brig sank off the mouth of the Weser and 10 nautical miles (19 km) off Heligoland. Her crew were rescued by the full-rigged ship Kearsarge (United States). Glencoe was on a voyage from Sunderland, County Durham to Bremerhaven, Germany. |
| Hato | Russia | The brig collided with the brig Luisella (United Kingdom) and was driven ashore at Wear Point, Pembrokeshire, United Kingdom. Hato was on a voyage from Liverpool to Baltimore, Maryland, United States. |
| Huddersfield | United Kingdom | The steamship was driven ashore on Wangeroog, Germany. She was on a voyage from Grimsby, Lincolnshire to Hamburg, Germany. She was refloated and put into Cuxhaven, Germany flooded midships and astern. |
| Ino | United Kingdom | The ship ran aground at Gjedser, Denmark. She was on a voyage from Nakskov, Denmark to Hull, Yorkshire. She was refloated and taken into Copenhagen, Denmark. |
| Jeune Leonora | United Kingdom | The lugger foundered in the English Channel off Beachy Head, Sussex, United Kingdom. Her five crew were rescued by Themis (Norway). Jeune Leonora was on a voyage from Saint-Nazaire, Ille-et-Vilaine to Havre de Grâce, Seine-Inférieure |
| Kathleen | United Kingdom | The ship was wrecked on the East Barrow Sand. Her crew were rescued. She was on a voyage from Gainsborough, Lincolnshire to London. |
| Lark | United Kingdom | The ship was wrecked on the East Barrow Sand. Her crew were rescued. She was on a voyage from Goole to London. |
| Maria | United Kingdom | The brigantine put into Milford Haven, Pembrokeshire on fire and was scuttled. She was on a voyage from Dublin to London. |
| Nereid | (Canada) | The ship was sighted off Reedy Island, Delaware, United States whilst on a voyage from Philadelphia, Pennsylvania, United States to Liverpool. No further trace, presumed foundered with the loss of all hands. |
| Railway King | (Canada) | The ship was driven ashore at Cape Canso, Nova Scotia. She was on a voyage from Pictou, Nova Scotia to Havana, Cuba. She was a total loss. |
| Sacramento | United States | The steamship was wrecked on a reef 200 nautical miles (370 km) south east of San Diego, California. All on board, more than 150 people, were rescued by the steamship Montana (United States). Sacramento was on a voyage from Panama City, United States of Colombia to San Francisco, California. |
| Sainte Philomene | France | The ship was driven ashore at Newton Noyse Point, Pembrokeshire. She was on a voyage from Liverpool to Fernando Po, Spanish Guinea. |
| Sondelad | Norway | The ship departed from New York, United States for Falmouth, Cornwall or Queenstown, County Cork, United Kingdom. No further trace, presumed foundered with the loss of all hands. |

== 11 December ==
List of shipwrecks: 11 December 1872
| Ship | State | Description |
|---|---|---|
| Alberta | United Kingdom | The ship ran aground on the Scroby Sands, Norfolk. She was on a voyage from Hartlepool, County Durham to London. She was refloated and taken into Lowestoft, Suffolk in a leaky condition. |
| Aunt Sally | United Kingdom | The ship was abandoned in the North Sea. Her crew were rescued. She was on a voyage from South Shields, County Durham to Ramsgate, Kent. |
| Brothers | United Kingdom | The schooner was driven ashore near Rhyl, Denbighshire. Her crew were rescued by the Point of Ayr Lifeboat. |
| Constant | United Kingdom | The ship was driven ashore on Amager, Denmark. She was on a voyage from Wismar, Germany to Gothenburg, Sweden. |
| Dagmar | Russia | The barque was abandoned in the North Sea. Her thirteen crew were rescued by a fishing smack. |
| Florence | United Kingdom | The steamship was abandoned in the Atlantic Ocean 80 nautical miles (150 km) south west of The Lizard, Cornwall. Her 22 crew were rescued by the steamship Edgar (United Kingdom). Florence was on a voyage from Cardiff, Glamorgan to Civita Vecchia, Italy. |
| Franklin | United States | The emigrant ship was driven ashore on Vlieland, Friesland, Netherlands. All on board, about 200 people, were rescued. She was on a voyage from Hamburg, Germany to San Francisco, California. |
| Haminja | Norway | The schooner departed from Lerwick, Shetland Islands, United Kingdom for Hamburg. No further trace, presumed foundered in the North Sea with the loss of all hands. |
| Johns | United Kingdom | The brig was abandoned off Great Yarmouth, Norfolk. Her crew were rescued by the Great Yarmouth Lifeboat. Johns was on a voyage from Söderhamn, Sweden to London. She came ashore at Great Yarmouth and was wrecked. |
| Karmt | Norway | The steamship was wrecked on the Lemon and Ower Sand, in the North Sea. Her crew were rescued. She was on her maiden voyage, from Hangosund to Porto, Portugal. |
| Nea Kalliope | Greece | The brig was driven ashore at Gibraltar. |
| Sea | United Kingdom | The schooner was driven ashore at Margate, Kent. |
| Stirling Castle | United Kingdom | The ship departed from New York, United States for London. No further trace, presumed foundered with the loss of all hands. |

== 12 December ==
List of shipwrecks: 12 December 1872
| Ship | State | Description |
|---|---|---|
| Allan | United Kingdom | The ship was abandoned at sea. Her crew were rescued by the steamship Adriatic (United Kingdom). Allan was on a voyage from Bathurst, Gambia Colony and Protectorate to Liverpool, Lancashire. |
| Ann and Elizabeth | United Kingdom | The ship foundered off The Lizard, Cornwall. Her crew survived. She was on a voyage from Charlestown, Cornwall to Runcorn, Cheshire. |
| Claribelle | United Kingdom | The ship was abandoned in the Atlantic Ocean. Her crew were rescued by the steamship Adriatic. |
| Despatch | United Kingdom | The tug ran aground in the River Mersey at Waterloo, Lancashire. |
| Gettysburg | United States | The ship was driven ashore in the Mississippi River. She was on a voyage from Liverpool to New Orleans, Louisiana. |
| Industry | United Kingdom | The brig departed from Constantinople, Ottoman Empire for Falmouth, Cornwall. No further trace, presumed foundered with the loss of all nine crew. |
| Isabella Heron | United Kingdom | The schooner foundered in the North Sea 23 nautical miles (43 km) east of the Outer Dowsing Lightship ( Trinity House). Her crew were rescued by the schooner Sancho Panza (United Kingdom). Isabella Heron was on a voyage from Blyth, Northumberland to Chatham, Kent. |
| Köningen Elizabeth | Germany | The ship sank in the North Sea. Her crew were rescued by Ernest (United Kingdom). Köningen Elizabeth was on a voyage from an English port to Königsberg. |
| Lincoln | United Kingdom | The ship departed from New York, United States for London. No further trace, presumed foundered with the loss of all hands. |
| Orion | United Kingdom | The ship was wrecked on Ameland, Friesland, Netherlands. Her crew were rescued. She was on a voyage from Sunderland, County Durham to Zierikzee, Zeeland, Netherlands. |
| Reubens | Norway | The barque foundered. Her crew were rescued. She was on a voyage from London, United Kingdom to Drøbak. |
| Southland | United Kingdom | The ship was wrecked on "Kyming Island". She was on a voyage from Yantai to Shanghai, China. |

== 13 December ==
List of shipwrecks: 13 December 1872
| Ship | State | Description |
|---|---|---|
| Anna Maria | Canada | The schooner was wrecked at Point Aconi, Nova Scotia. |
| Euphemia | United Kingdom | The barque ran aground on the Tuskar Rock. Her crew took refuge in the lighthouse, apart from four who were rescued by the Coastguard and two who were rescued by the Carnsore Lifeboat. She was refloated the next day and towed into South Bay, County Wexford by the tugs Petley and Ruby (both United Kingdom). |
| Gilda | Trieste | The ship was wrecked at Royan, Charente-Inférieure, France. Her crew were rescued. She was on a voyage from Bordeaux, Gironde, France to Cardiff, Glamorgan, United Kingdom. |
| Margaret and Jane | United Kingdom | The sloop was wrecked on the coast of Caernarfonshire with the loss of a crew member. She was on a voyage from an Irish port to Portmadoc, Caernarfonshire. |
| Norden | Sweden | The ship put into Cowes, Isle of Wight, United Kingdom in a waterlogged condition. She was on a voyage from Sundsvall to Barcelona, Spain. |

== 14 December ==
List of shipwrecks: 14 December 1872
| Ship | State | Description |
|---|---|---|
| Annie Broughton | United Kingdom | The steamship was abandoned east of the Isles of Scilly. Her crew were rescued by Nerius (United Kingdom). Annie Broughton was on a voyage from Nicolaieff, Russia to Leith, Lothian. |
| B. L. George | United Kingdom | The brig was severely damaged at Sydney, Nova Scotia, Canada. |
| Delia | Canada | The brigantine departed from the Gut of Canso for Penarth, Glamorgan, United Kingdom. No further trace, presumed foundered with the loss of all hands. |
| Eliza | France | The ship was abandoned in the Atlantic Ocean. Her crew were rescued by Diogenes (Brazil). Eliza was on a voyage from Maracaibo, Venezuela to Marseille, Bouches-du-Rhône. |
| G. J. Troop | United Kingdom | The brig was severely damaged at Sydney, Nova Scotia. |
| H. B. Emery | United Kingdom | The brigantine was run into by the steamship Sunderland (United Kingdom) and sank in the Irish Sea. Her crew were rescued by Sunderland. H. B. Emery was on a voyage from Liverpool, Lancashire to Havana, Cuba. |
| Jenny Lind | (Russian Empire) Grand Duchy of Finland | The barque ran aground on the Goodwin Sands, Kent, United Kingdom and sank with the loss of six of her eleven crew. Survivors were rescued by the Ramsgate Lifeboat Bradford ( Royal National Lifeboat Institution) and a Deal lugger. Jenny Lind was on a voyage from Hull, Yorkshire, United Kingdom to Genoa, Italy. |
| John and George | United Kingdom | The smack was beached at Penarth She was on a voyage from Cardiff, Glamorgan to Bridgwater, Somerset. |
| Kate Upham | United Kingdom | The brig was severely damaged at Sydney, Nova Scotia. |
| Kokola | Russia | The barque collided with the steamship Danube (United Kingdom) and sank in the Mediterranean Sea off Cape Seratiff, Spain. Her fourteen crew were rescued. by Danube. Kokola was on a voyage from Cartagena, Spain to Cardiff, Glamorgan, United Kingdom. |
| Margaret Ann | United Kingdom | The ship was beached at the Mumbles, Glamorgan. She was on a voyage from Quebec City, Canada to Swansea, Glamorgan. |
| Maria | Germany | The barque ran aground on the Westerground. She was on a voyage from Grangemouth, Stirlingshire, United Kingdom to Stettin. |
| M. B. Albon | United Kingdom | The ship was wrecked at Cow Bay, Nova Scotia. |
| Reindeer | United Kingdom | The steamship sprang a leak, capsized and foundered in the Mediterranean Sea 30 nautical miles (56 km) east of Pantelleria, Italy with the loss of a crew member. Survivors were rescued by the brig Mary Ann and/or the steamship George Prescott (both United Kingdom). Reindeer was on a voyage from Odesa, Russia to Falmouth, Cornwall. |
| Supply | United Kingdom | The brig was wrecked on the Hook Sand. Her crew were rescued. She was on a voyage from Guernsey, Channel Islands to London. |
| Wangerland | Germany | The brig ran aground on the Goodwin Sands. She was on a voyage from Antwerp, Belgium to Bahia, Brazil. She was refloated with the assistance of the lugger Buffalo Gal (United Kingdom) and towed into Ramsgate in a leaky condition by the tug Restless (United Kingdom). |

== 15 December ==
List of shipwrecks: 15 December 1872
| Ship | State | Description |
|---|---|---|
| Dove | Canada | The brig was abandoned in the Atlantic Ocean. Her crew were rescued by the steamship Olaf Trygvesen (Flag unknown). Dove was on a voyage from Liverpool, Nova Scotia to Windsor, Nova Scotia. |
| Elizabeth | United Kingdom | The schooner was driven ashore and wrecked at Main-à-Dieu, Nova Scotia, Canada. |
| Emma Jane | United Kingdom | The schooner collided with the barque Matilda (Austria-Hungary) and sank in the Bristol Channel. Her crew were rescued by Matilda. Emma Jane was on a voyage from Kinsale, County Cork to Newport, Monmouthshire. |
| Napier | Canada | The brigantine was abandoned in the Atlantic Ocean with the loss of a crew member. Survivors were rescued by J. A. Wright (United Kingdom). Napier was on a voyage from Sydney, Nova Scotia to St. Jago de Cuba, Cuba. |
| Otterburn | United Kingdom | The steamship was abandoned in the Bay of Biscay. Her crew were rescued. She was on a voyage from South Shields, County Durham to Odesa, Russia. |
| Rinaldo | United Kingdom | The ship was sighted whilst on a voyage from Leith, Lothian to San Francisco, California, United States. No further trace, presumed foundered with the loss of all hands. |
| Royal Arch | United Kingdom | The barque was wrecked at the mouth of the New Calabar River, Africa. Her crew were rescued by the steamship Roquelle (United Kingdom). Royal Arch was on a voyage from New Calabar to Liverpool, Lancashire. |
| Sarah Jane | United Kingdom | The barque was driven ashore and wrecked at Paul Colleen Point, County Cork. Her crew were rescued. She was on a voyage from Cork to Cardiff, Glamorgan. |

== 16 December ==
List of shipwrecks: 16 December 1872
| Ship | State | Description |
|---|---|---|
| Bertha | United Kingdom | The ship departed from the River Tyne for Pará, Brazil. No further trace, presumed foundered with the loss of all hands. |
| Chancellor | United Kingdom | The ship was abandoned at sea. Her crew were rescued by the barque Hamburg (France). Chancellor was on a voyage from Cardiff, Glamorgan to Cienfuegos, Cuba. |
| Endeavour | United Kingdom | The brig was driven against the quayside at Douglas, Isle of Man and damaged. |
| Henrietta | United States | The schooner was driven ashore and wrecked on Ruatan. Her crew were rescued. |
| Martha James | United Kingdom | The ship was beached in Llandudno Bay at Old Llandudno. Her crew were rescued. She was on a voyage from London to Whitehaven, Cumberland. |
| American Union | United States | The ship was driven ashore and wrecked at East Blatchington, Sussex. Sixteen of her 27 crew were rescued by the Coastguard using rocket apparatus, the rest subsequently got ashore. She was on a voyage from New York to London, United Kingdom. |
| Union | United Kingdom | The barque was wrecked on the Maiahu Bank, off the coast of Brazil. Her crew were rescued. She was on a voyage from Antwerp, Belgium to Pará. |

== 17 December ==
List of shipwrecks: 17 December 1872
| Ship | State | Description |
|---|---|---|
| Annie Lisle | United Kingdom | The barque was driven ashore and severely damaged at Dungeness, Kent. Her crew were rescued. She was on a voyage from London to Melbourne, Victoria. She was refloated on 26 December and taken in tow for London. |
| Arethusa | United Kingdom | The schooner collided with a smack and the tug Spurn (United Kingdom, was driven against the pier, and sank at Grimsby, Lincolnshire. She was on a voyage from Hartlepool, County Durham to Dublin. |
| Beccles | United Kingdom | The ship was wrecked 2 nautical miles (3.7 km) north of Amble, Northumberland with the loss of all hands. |
| Consul | United Kingdom | The barque was wrecked at Tynemouth, Northumberland with the loss of seven of her ten crew. Survivors were rescued by breeches buoy. She was on a voyage from South Shields, County Durham to Genoa, Italy. |
| Cornelius | United Kingdom | The brig was driven ashore at Grimsby. |
| Don | (United Kingdom of Great Britain and Ireland) Jersey | The ship ran aground on the Brake Sand. She was refloated and taken into Ramsgate, Kent in a severely leaky condition. |
| Duff | United Kingdom | The brig was wrecked on the Herd Sand, in the North Sea off the coast of County Durham with the loss of two of her seven crew. Survivors were rescued by the North Shields and South Shields Lifeboats. She was on a voyage from Sunderland, County Durham to Portsmouth, Hampshire. Also reported that nine crew were lost. |
| Enterprise | United Kingdom | The smack was damaged at Scarborough, Yorkshire. |
| Fearless | United Kingdom | The smack was wrecked on the Buxey Sand, in the North Sea off the coast of Essex. Her crew were rescued. |
| Gallilee | United Kingdom | The smack was driven ashore and severely damaged at Scarborough. |
| General Lee | United Kingdom | The smack was driven ashore at Scarborough. |
| Gloamin | Canada | The barque was run ashore near Burnham-on-Crouch, Essex. She was on a voyage from Hamburg, Germany to Cardiff, Glamorgan, United Kingdom. |
| Hope | United Kingdom | The schooner was run down and sunk in the Irish Sea 14 nautical miles (26 km) off the Codling Lightship ( Trinity House) by the barque Calderbank (United Kingdom). Her three crew were rescued by Calderbank. Hope was on a voyage from Chester, Cheshire to Dublin. |
| Intrepid | United Kingdom | The smack was damaged at Scarborough. |
| Jamais | United Kingdom | The ship was driven ashore and wrecked at South Shields. Her crew were rescued by the North Shields and South Shields Lifeboats. |
| Liza Cornish | United Kingdom | The ship foundered in the North Sea off the coast of Northumberland with the loss of all hands. |
| Luconia | Germany | The brig was wrecked on the coast of Pas-de-Calais, France. Her thirteen crew were rescued. She was on a voyage from Philadelphia, Pennsylvania, United States to Bremen. |
| Madre de Solga, or Madre de Soza | Italy | The brig was wrecked north of Blyth, Northumberland, United Kingdom with the loss of eight of her twelve crew. She was on a voyage from Amsterdam, North Holland, Netherlands to South Shields. |
| Maiden Queen | United Kingdom | The smack was driven ashore at Scarborough. |
| Matchless | United Kingdom | The schooner was wrecked at Hauxley, Northumberland with the loss of all hands. She was refloated on 19 December and taken into South Shields. |
| Minerva | Italy | The brig was driven ashore and wrecked at Blyth with the loss of six of her nine crew. She was on a voyage from Chatham, Kent to Blyth. |
| Natalian | United Kingdom | The steamship was driven ashore and wrecked at Sunderland. Her crew were rescued by rocket apparatus. She was on a voyage from London to Sunderland. |
| Ocean | United Kingdom | The brig capsized, was driven ashore and was wrecked near Amble with the loss of all hands. |
| Rose Bud | United Kingdom | The ship foundered in the North Sea off the coast of Northumberland with the loss of all hands. |
| Rose in June | United Kingdom | The fishing boat was wrecked at Elie, Fife with the loss of two of her six crew. |
| Russell | United Kingdom | The ship was wrecked at Hauxley with the loss of all hands. |
| Sorrento | United Kingdom | The steamship ran aground on the Goodwin Sands, Kent and broke in two. She was on a voyage from a Mediterranean port to Newcastle upon Tyne, Northumberland. Her 32 crew, plus eight crew of the Walmer Lifeboat Centurion ( Royal National Lifeboat Institution), who had been put on board to assist, were rescued by the Kingsdown Lifeboat Sabrina ( Royal National Lifeboat Institution). |
| Union | United Kingdom | The schooner was driven ashore at Hartlepool, County Durham. She was on a voyage from Scarborough, North Riding of Yorkshire to Hartlepool. |
| Victor | United Kingdom | The smack was driven ashore at Scarborough. |
| Victor | United Kingdom | The smack was damaged at Scarborough. |
| Wave | United Kingdom | The collier, a schooner, was severely damaged at Scarborough. |
| Unnamed | Netherlands | The barque was driven ashore and severely damaged at Dungeness. Her crew were rescued. |
| Unnamed | United Kingdom | The smack was run down and sunk at Grimsby by the schooner Arethusa (United Kingdom). |

== 18 December ==
List of shipwrecks: 18 December 1872
| Ship | State | Description |
|---|---|---|
| Bliss | United Kingdom | The ship sank in the River Thames. She was on a voyage from Rouen, Seine-Inférieure to London. |
| Bracer | United Kingdom | The schooner was driven ashore and wrecked at Hauxley, Northumberland with the loss of all hands. |
| Commandeur Solling | Norway | The brig was driven ashore at Seaton Delaval, County Durham, United Kingdom. One of her ten crew was rescued by the Coastguard using rocket apparatus, the rest were rescued by the West Hartlepool Lifeboat Forester's Pride ( Royal National Lifeboat Institution). |
| Elizabeth | United Kingdom | The ship put into Leith, Lothian in a sinking condition. She was on a voyage from Sunderland, County Durham to London. |
| Gleaner | United Kingdom | The brig was wrecked on the Herd Sand, in the North Sea off the coast of County Durham with the loss of six of her fourteen crew. Survivors were rescued by the South Shields Lifeboats Northumberland (United Kingdom) and Tom Perry ( Royal National Lifeboat Institution). Gleaner was on a voyage from Amble, Northumberland to Boulogne-sur-Mer, Pas-de-Calais, France. |
| Father Matthews | United Kingdom | The brig was driven ashore and wrecked at Hauxley with the loss of all hands. |
| Jamais | United Kingdom | The ship was wrecked at Teignmouth, Devon. Her crew were rescued by the Teignmouth Lifeboat. |
| Martha Radman | United States | The barque was wrecked on the Banjaard Sand, in the North Sea off the Dutch coast. She was on a voyage from New York to Antwerp, Belgium. |
| Northumberland | United Kingdom | The lifeboat capsized off South Shields with the loss of four of her crew. |
| Pioneer | United Kingdom | The trow was driven ashore at Penarth, Glamorgan. |
| Princess Alexandria | United Kingdom | The steamship ran aground at Stubben, Germany. She was on a voyage from Königsberg, Germany to an English port. She was refloated the next day. |
| Providence | United Kingdom | The brig was driven ashore and wrecked at the mouth of the River North Esk. One of her five crew survived. She was on a voyage from Seaham, County Durham to Great Yarmouth, Norfolk. |
| Sofie | Denmark | The galiot was in the North Sea off Wells-next-the-Sea, Norfolk with the loss of four of her five crew. The survivor was rescued by a fishing boat. She was on a voyage from Randers to Wells-next-the-Sea. |
| Unnamed | Flag unknown | The ship foundered in the North Sea off Stonehaven, Aberdeenshire. |
| Unnamed | Flag unknown | The ship was driven ashore near the mouth of the River North Esk with the loss of four of her crew. |

== 19 December ==
List of shipwrecks: 19 December 1872
| Ship | State | Description |
|---|---|---|
| Emma Trenchman | Germany | The ship ran aground in the Hellegat. She was on a voyage from Pillau to Rotterdam, South Holland, Netherlands. |
| Grampus | United Kingdom | The brigantine was wrecked on the Sunk Sand, in the North Sea off the coast of Essex. Her crew survived. She was on a voyage from Middlesbrough, Yorkshire to Cardiff, Glamorgan. |
| Ida | United Kingdom | The brig was driven ashore at South Shields, County Durham. |
| Neston | United Kingdom | The steamship ran aground on the Nore. |
| Providence | United Kingdom | The schooner was wrecked at Montrose, Forfarshire with the loss of five of her six crew. |

== 20 December ==
List of shipwrecks: 20 December 1872
| Ship | State | Description |
|---|---|---|
| Calcium | United Kingdom | The steamship was driven ashore at Kirkcaldy, Fife. She was on a voyage from Kirkcaldy to Newcastle upon Tyne, Northumberland. She was refloated on 27 December. |
| Charles and Edward | United Kingdom | The ship was wrecked on the Caicos Reef. She was on a voyage from Troon, Ayrshire to Cárdenas, Cuba. |
| Francis Collins | Canada | The ship was abandoned in the Atlantic Ocean. Her nine crew were rescued by James Jardine (United Kingdom. Francis Collins was on a voyage from Havana, Cuba to Pará, Brazil. |
| George Downes | United Kingdom | The brig was wrecked on reefs north west of Bermuda. She was on a voyage from New York, United States to Demerara, British Guiana. |
| Hays | United Kingdom | The ship ran aground on the Briggs, off Groomsport, County Down and was abandoned by her crew. She was on a voyage from Falmouth, Cornwall to Belfast, County Antrim. |
| Helen Mar | United Kingdom | The schooner was driven ashore near Carrickfergus, County Antrim. She was on a voyage from Dublin to Whitehaven, Cumberland. |
| Maria S. | Austria-Hungary | The ship sank at Dunkirk, Nord, France. She was on a voyage from Dunkirk to Greenock, Renfrewshire, United Kingdom. |
| Mozart | Germany | The ship ran aground and was wrecked at Gallipoli, Ottoman Empire. She was on a voyage from Berdyanski, Russia to a British port. |
| Sally | United Kingdom | The cutter was run into by the pilot boat No. 8 (United Kingdom and sank in the English Channel 10 nautical miles (19 km) off The Lizard, Cornwall. One of her four crew was rescued by No. 8, the other three landed at Coverack in their boat. |
| Swift | United Kingdom | The schooner was driven ashore and wrecked at Newcastle, County Down. Her crew were rescued by the Newcastle Lifeboat. She was on a voyage from Wexford to Ayr and/or Glasgow, Renfrewshire. |
| Udjas | Norway | The barque was abandoned in the North Sea 15 nautical miles (28 km) north west by north of the Leman Lightship ( Trinity House). Udjas was on a voyage from Gothenburg, Sweden to Philadelphia, Pennsylvania, United States. She was towed into Grimsby, Lincolnshire, United Kingdom the next day by the smacks Glance and Pet (both United Kingdom). |
| Young George | United Kingdom | The schooner was driven ashore at "Donelau", France with the loss of a crew member. |

== 21 December ==
List of shipwrecks: 21 December 1872
| Ship | State | Description |
|---|---|---|
| Argentine | United States | The barque was wrecked on the Galloper Sand. All on board were rescued. She was on a voyage from South Shields, County Durham, United Kingdom to Havana, Cuba. |
| Ellen Morris | United Kingdom | The ship was driven ashore at Carrickfergus, County Antrim. |
| Germany | United Kingdom | The steamship ran aground and was wrecked at the mouth of the Gironde with the loss of 26 of the 127 people on board. Survivors were rescued the next day by the steamship Astramadoure and several sloops (all France). Germany was on a voyage from Liverpool, Lancashire to New Orleans, Louisiana, United States via Pauillac, Gironde, France and Havana, Cuba. |
| Hawthorn | United Kingdom | The barque was driven ashore at Sea Palling, Norfolk. Her crew were rescued. She was on a voyage from London to Sunderland, County Durham. |
| Henriette | Germany | The brig was driven ashore at Montrose, Forfarshire, United Kingdom. Her eight crew were rescued by the Montrose Lifeboats Mincing Lane and Roman Governor (both Royal National Lifeboat Institution). Henriette was on a voyage from Sligo, United Kingdom to Memel. |
| Union | United Kingdom | The schooner ran aground on the Foreness Rock, Margate, Kent and was wrecked. Her crew were rescued. She was on a voyage from Plymouth, Devon to Hamburg, Germany. She was refloated in May 1873, departing for Plymouth on 9 May. |
| Wave | United Kingdom | The schooner was abandoned in the North Sea. Her four crew were rescued by the barque Hebe (United Kingdom). Wave was driven ashore and wrecked at Peteread, Aberdeenshire. She was on a voyage from Stettin, Germany to Montrose, Forfarshire. |
| William | United Kingdom | The sloop collided with the Mersey Ferry Lancashire (United Kingdom) and sank at Liverpool, Lancashire. |

== 22 December ==
List of shipwrecks: 22 December 1872
| Ship | State | Description |
|---|---|---|
| Britannia | United Kingdom | The ship departed from Marans, Charente-Inférieure, France for the River Tyne. No further trace, presumed foundered with the loss of all hands. |
| Champion | United Kingdom | The brigantine was wrecked at Madeira with the loss of five of her crew. |
| Circassian | United Kingdom | The steamship was driven ashore at Smyrna, Ottoman Empire. |
| Druid | United Kingdom | The brig was abandoned in the Atlantic Ocean. Her crew were rescued by Great Britain (United Kingdom). Druid was on a voyage from New Orleans, Louisiana to Cork. |
| Lufra | United Kingdom | The steamship ran aground and was severely damaged in the Suez Canal. She was on a voyage from Ismailia, Egypt to Hull, Yorkshire. She was refloated and assisted into Port Said, Egypt. |
| Tiber | United Kingdom | The steamship ran aground on the Haisborough Sands, in the North Sea off the coast of Norfolk. She was on a voyage from Bremen, Germany to Liverpool, Lancashire. She was refloated the next day and towed into Hull by the steamships Leeds and Lord Cardigan (both United Kingdom). |

== 23 December ==
List of shipwrecks: 23 December 1872
| Ship | State | Description |
|---|---|---|
| Amelia | United Kingdom | The schooner was wrecked near Cahore, County Wexford with the loss of two of her four crew. Survivors were rescued by the Coastguard. She was on a voyage from Cardiff, Glamorgan to Dublin. |
| Arturo | Italy | The derelict barque was towed into the Bosphorus. She was on a voyage from Berdyanski, Russia to Genoa. |
| Chrysolite | United Kingdom | The brigantine was driven ashore on Walney Island, Lancashire. She was on a voyage from Rotterdam, South Holland, Netherlands to Barrow-in-Furness, Lancashire. She was refloated on 27 December. |
| Cyrene | United Kingdom | The ship foundered off Wick, Caithness. |
| Moselle | France | The steamship was driven ashore on the Barbary Coast. |
| Rosa | United Kingdom | The steamship was driven ashore at Falsterbo, Sweden. She was on a voyage from Danzig, Germany to Hartlepool, County Durham. She was refloated with assistance and taken into Malmö, Sweden. |
| Stella | France | The schooner was wrecked at "Tinamayos". |

== 24 December ==
List of shipwrecks: 24 December 1872
| Ship | State | Description |
|---|---|---|
| Adler | Germany | The barque was driven ashore and wrecked on Anrum. She was on a voyage from South Shields, County Durham, United Kingdom to Hamburg. |
| Anglo-Dane | United Kingdom | The steamship was run into by the steamship Sappho (United Kingdom) at Pillau, Germany and was severely damaged. |
| Edgar | United Kingdom | The steamship was driven ashore and wrecked at Thisted, Denmark. Her twenty crew were rescued. She was on a voyage from Hull, Yorkshire to Danzig, Germany. |
| Elizabeth Taylorson | United Kingdom | The ship was abandoned off the Isles of Scilly. Her crew were rescued by Florist (United Kingdom). Elizabeth Taylorson was on a voyage from South Shields to Málaga, Spain. |
| Elkana | Norway | The schooner was wrecked near "Waterno". Her crew were rescued. She was on a voyage from Dysart, Fife, United Kingdom to Stavanger. |
| James Watt | United Kingdom | The steamship collided with the steamship Holyrood (United Kingdom) and sank in the Clyde. She was on a voyage from Greenock to Glasgow, Renfrewshire. Subsequently refloated, repaired and returned to service. |
| Pelayo | United Kingdom | The steamship was driven ashore at Seaforth, Lancashire. She was later refloated and taken into Liverpool, Lancashire. |
| Robert Fulton | United Kingdom | The schooner was wrecked at Manzanilla, Trinidad. Her crew were rescued. She was on a voyage from the Clyde River, Nova Scotia, Canada to Manzanilla. |

== 25 December ==
List of shipwrecks: 25 December 1872
| Ship | State | Description |
|---|---|---|
| Andy Baum | United States | The steamboat was crushed by ice and severely damaged in the Mississippi River at Memphis, Tennessee. |
| Arlington | United States | The steamboat was crushed by ice and damaged in the Mississippi River at Memphis. |
| Artisan | United States | The steamship was driven ashore at Lewes, Delaware. |
| Belle Pike | United States | The steamboat was crushed by ice and sank in the Mississippi River at Memphis. She was a total loss. |
| Celeste | United States | The steamboat was crushed by ice and sank in the Mississippi River at Memphis. All on board were rescued. |
| Clipper | United States | The steamboat, along with four barges was swept downstream from Memphis by ice. |
| Glasgow | United States | The steamboat was crushed by ice and severely damaged in the Mississippi River at Memphis. She was on a voyage from New Orleans, Louisiana to St. Louis, Missouri. |
| HMS Hercules, and HMS Northumberland | Royal Navy | HMS Hercules and HMS Northumberland. The ironclad HMS Hercules and the Minotaur-class ironclad HMS Northumberland collided at Funchal, Madeira. HMS Hercules was damaged. HMS Northumberland was severely damaged; she sailed to Malta for repairs. |
| Island Queen | United Kingdom | The barque foundered in the Atlantic Ocean. Her thirteen crew were rescued by the steamship Maindee Park (United Kingdom). Island Queen was on a voyage from Alexandria, Egypt to Hull, Yorkshire. |
| Mercurius | Denmark | The barque was wrecked on the Jadder, in the North Sea. She was on a voyage from Newcastle upon Tyne, Northumberland, United Kingdom to Helsingør. |
| R. P. Walt | United States | The steamboat was sunk by ice in the Mississippi River at Memphis. |
| Summer Koon | United States | The steamboat was crushed by ice and sank in the Mississippi River at Memphis. |
| Undine | United States | The steamboat was crushed by ice, capsized and sank in the Mississippi River 2 nautical miles (3.7 km) downstream of Memphis. |
| West Wind | United States | The steamboat was crushed by ice and sank in the Mississippi River at Memphis. |
| More than 50 unnamed vessels | United States | The barges and flatboats were sunk by ice in the Mississippi River at Memphis. |
| Ten unnamed vessels | United States | The steamboats were crushed by ice and sank in the Mississippi River at Memphis. |

== 26 December ==
List of shipwrecks: 26 December 1872
| Ship | State | Description |
|---|---|---|
| Annie Marie | France | The barque was driven ashore and wrecked in Mossel Bay. |
| Bavelaw | United Kingdom | The ship ran aground in the Hooghly River. She was on a voyage from Calcutta, India to Dundee, Forfarshire. She was refloated and completed her voyage. Subsequently taken into Liverpool, Lancashire for repairs. |
| Crixea | United Kingdom | The ship was driven ashore at East London, Cape Colony. |
| Cruiser | United Kingdom | The barque was driven ashore in Algoa Bay. Her crew were rescued. |
| Donan Castle | United Kingdom | The schooner was run into by a steamship and foundered in the English Channel 15 nautical miles (28 km) south east of The Lizard, Cornwall. Her crew survived. She was on a voyage from Mazagan, Morocco to Falmouth, Cornwall. |
| E. B. Lohe | Flag unknown | The ship was driven ashore in Algoa Bay. Her crew were rescued. |
| Europa | Norway | The brig foundered off Strömstad, Sweden. Her crew were rescued. |
| Frances | Germany | The barque was driven ashore at Cape Cod, Massachusetts, United States. Her crew were rescued, but her captain died two days later. She was on a voyage from Singapore, Straits Settlements to Boston, Massachusetts. She broke up in February 1873. |
| Gluckauf | Germany | The ship was sighted off Almería, Spain whilst on a voyage from Taganrog, Russia to a British port. No further trace, presumed foundered with the loss of all hands. |
| Industry | United Kingdom | The sloop ran aground on the Maplin Sand, in the North Sea off the coast of Essex. She was on a voyage from London to Cardigan. |
| Kadosh | United States | The ship was wrecked at Point Allerton, Massachusetts with the loss of seven of her crew. She was on a voyage from Manila, Spanish East Indies to Boston, Massachusetts. |
| Magneten | Flag unknown | The ship was driven ashore and wrecked in Plettenberg Bay. |
| Minnet | United Kingdom | The ship ran aground off Midia, Ottoman Empire and was wrecked. She was on a voyage from Odesa, Russia to a British port. |
| Minnesota | United Kingdom | The steamship was damaged by fire whilst on a voyage from New York to Liverpool. |
| Peruvian | United States | The steamship was wrecked on the Peaked Hill Bars with the loss of all 25 crew. She was on a voyage from Singapore, Straits Settlements to Boston. |
| Taurus | France | The barque was driven ashore in Algoa Bay. |
| Thistle | United Kingdom | The steamship ran aground in the Dardanelles. She was on a voyage from Sulina, Ottoman Empire to Falmouth, Cornwall. She was refloated the next day with the assistance of a tug. |

== 27 December ==
List of shipwrecks: 27 December 1872
| Ship | State | Description |
|---|---|---|
| Amyntas | United Kingdom | The schooner was driven ashore and wrecked at Workington, Cumberland with the loss of all nine people on board. She was on a voyage from Swansea, Glamorgan to Workington. |
| Braila | Ottoman Empire | The ship was wrecked at "Aicos". |
| Caroline Phillips | United Kingdom | The ship was abandoned at Padstow Cornwall. Her crew were rescued by the Padstow Lifeboat Albert Edward ( Royal National Lifeboat Institution). |
| John Straker | United Kingdom | The ship ran aground on the Maplin Sand, in the North Sea off the coast of Essex. She was on a voyage from Odesa, Russia to London. |
| Joseph Busby | United Kingdom | The barque capsized at Barbados. She was on a voyage from Pensacola, Florida, United states to Cardiff, Glamorgan. |
| Lady Aberdour | United Kingdom | The brig was driven ashore at Damietta, Egypt. Her crew were rescued. She was on a voyage from Cardiff to Port Said, Egypt. |

== 28 December ==
List of shipwrecks: 28 December 1872
| Ship | State | Description |
|---|---|---|
| Alexandria | United Kingdom | The ship was driven ashore at Braystones, Cumberland. She was on a voyage from Quebec City, Canada to Whitehaven, Cumberland. |
| Clara | Denmark | The ship sprang a leak at Casablanca, Morocco. She subsequently became a wreck. |
| Georges Rosine | France | The schooner was wrecked near St. Ubes, Portugal. She was on a voyage from Liverpool, Lancashire, United Kingdom to Rio de Janeiro, Brazil. |
| Fawn | United Kingdom | The ship foundered in the English Channel off the coast of Sussex. |
| Hillegonda Maria | Netherlands | The galiot foundered off the Farne Islands, Northumberland, United Kingdom. Her crew were rescued. She was on a voyage from Newcastle upon Tyne, Northumberland to Harlingen, Friesland. |
| Isabella Harnett | United Kingdom | The barque was abandoned in the Atlantic Ocean. Her crew were rescued by Demetria (United States). Isabella Harnett was on a voyage from New Orleans, Louisiana, United States to Antwerp, Belgium. |
| Leon Raymundo | United Kingdom | The schooner collided with the brig Niger (United Kingdom) and was run ashore at Saltfleet, Lincolnshire. Leon Raymundo was on a voyage from Ipswich, Suffolk to St. Andrews, Fife. She was refloated and taken into Grimsby, Lincolnshire in a leaky condition. |
| Semiramis | United Kingdom | The ship was wrecked near Villa del Cerro, Uruguay. Her crew were rescued by the steamship Artigas (United Kingdom). She was on a voyage from Cardiff, Glamorgan to Montevideo, Uruguay. |
| Shark | United Kingdom | The steamship was driven ashore and wrecked in Tacumshane Bay. She was on a voyage from Dunkirk, Nord, France to Liverpool, Lancashire. |
| Unnamed | United Kingdom | The brig struck a submerged rock and sank off Hart Island, New York City, United States. |

== 29 December ==
List of shipwrecks: 29 December 1872
| Ship | State | Description |
|---|---|---|
| Bienfaisant | France | The ship ran aground at Clonakilty, County Cork, United Kingdom and became severely hogged. She was on a voyage from Nantes, Loire-Inférieure to Clonakilty. |
| Braganza | United Kingdom | The steamship ran aground on the wreck of the steamship Colorado (United Kingdom) off Crosby, Lancashire and was wrecked. She was on a voyage from Maranhão, Brazil to Liverpool, Lancashire. |
| Lizzie Raymond | United Kingdom | The barque was abandoned in the Atlantic Ocean. Her crew were rescued by Peter Joynson (United Kingdom) and she was set afire. Lizzie Raymond was on a voyage from Galveston, Texas, United States to Liverpool. |
| Lord of the Isles | Canada | The schooner was wrecked on Ironbound Island, Nova Scotia with the loss of six of her crew. She was on a voyage from Halifax, Nova Scotia to Saint Martins, Barbados. |
| United States | United Kingdom | The tug sprang a leak and sank at Liverpool. Her crew were rescued. |

== 30 December ==
List of shipwrecks: 30 December 1872
| Ship | State | Description |
|---|---|---|
| Assora | Norway | The ship ran aground on the Tornobaaern. She was on a voyage from Grangemouth, Stirlingshire, United Kingdom to Christiania. She was later refloated and completed her voyage, arriving at Christiania in a leaky condition on 3 January 1873. |
| Eastern State | United Kingdom | The barque was abandoned at sea. Her fifteen crew were rescued by Hermon (United Kingdom). Easternh State was on a voyage from Quebec City, Canada to Dublin. |
| Eugenie | United Kingdom | The barque was driven ashore at Östergarn. Sweden. Her crew were rescued. She was on a voyage from Grimsby, Lincolnshire to Åland, Grand Duchy of Finland. |
| J. D. Duffus | United States | The ship was severely damaged by fire at Charleston, South Carolina. |
| Jeune Alexandre | France | The ship was abandoned off the coast of Iceland. Her thirteen crew were rescued by the schooner Maher (Denmark). |
| Jeune Marie Louise | France | The ship was wrecked at Brest, Finistère. She was on a voyage from Nantes, Loire-Inférieure to Hayle, Cornwall, United Kingd. |
| Naomi and Jane | United Kingdom | The ship ran aground and was severely damaged at Ramsey, Isle of Man. She was on a voyage from Birkenhead, Cheshire to Dalbeattie, Kirkcudbrightshire. |
| North East | United Kingdom | The barque was driven ashore and wrecked in Struys Bay. She was on a voyage from Manila, Spanish East Indies to New York, United States. |
| Sabrina | United Kingdom | The ship collided with the tug Atlas (United Kingdom) and sank in the Bristol Channel. |

== 31 December ==
List of shipwrecks: 31 December 1872
| Ship | State | Description |
|---|---|---|
| Anna Charlotte | (Russian Empire) Grand Duchy of Finland | The ship was driven ashore on Skagen, Denmark. She was on a voyage from Hull, United Kingdom to Malmö, Sweden. |
| Brudenel | (Canada) | The brigantine was wrecked on Panmure Island, Prince Edward Island. She was on a voyage from Georgetown, Prince Edward Island to a British port. |
| Grey Eagle | United States | The steamboat was severely damaged by ice in the Ohio River at Cincinnati, Ohio. She was declared a total loss. |
| Hiram | Sweden | The brig was driven ashore at Donna Nook, Lincolnshire, United Kingdom. |
| Honora | United Kingdom | The schooner was driven ashore at Aberystwyth, Cardiganshire. Her crew were rescued. She was on a voyage from Aberystwyth to Runcorn, Cheshire. |
| Jupiter | United Kingdom | The ship was driven ashore and wrecked on Walney Island, Lancashire. Her crew were rescued. She was on a voyage from the River Duddon to Liverpool, Lancashire. |
| Katie Patnam | United States | The steamboat was sunk by ice in the Ohio River at Cincinnati. |
| Leonie | United Kingdom | The ship was wrecked on the east coast of Africa with the loss of five of the nineteen people on board. Survivors were taken prisoner by the local inhabitants; nine of them subsequently died. The five remaining survivors escaped and reached Mozambique on 14 May. |
| Messenger | United States | The steamboat was sunk by ice in the Ohio River at Cincinnati. |
| Mountain Boy | United States | The steamboat was sunk by ice in the Ohio River at Cincinnati. |
| Nightingale | United States | The barque was sunk by ice in the Ohio River at Cincinnati. |
| Tempest | United States | The ship collided with Esche (United States) and sank. She was on a voyage from the Milk River, Jamaica to New York. |
| Trial | United Kingdom | The schooner was wrecked at Bideford, Devon. Her crew were either rescued, or lost. |

== Unknown date ==
List of shipwrecks: Unknown date in December 1872
| Ship | State | Description |
|---|---|---|
| Agenoria | United Kingdom | The barque was wrecked on Anticosti Island, Nova Scotia, Canada before 20 December. |
| Albion | United Kingdom | The brig was abandoned in the Bay of Biscay with the loss of a crew member. She was on a voyage from the River Tyne to Lisbon, Portugal. |
| Amber Hayes | United Kingdom | The ship was wrecked in the Belfast Lough. |
| Annie Benin | United Kingdom | The ship was driven ashore in Mossel Bay. |
| Auxilar | United Kingdom | The ship ran aground at Port Hawkesbury, Nova Scotia. She was on a voyage from Quebec City, Canada to Liverpool, Lancashire. She had been refloated by 12 December and found to be leaky. |
| Bonderel | United Kingdom | The ship was wrecked on Panmure Island, Prince Edward Island, Canada before 23 December. She was on a voyage from a port in Prince Edward Island to Liverpool. |
| Benares | United Kingdom | The ship was wrecked in the Ryukyu Islands with the loss of all but five of her crew. She was on a voyage from Hong Kong to San Francisco, California, United States. Survivors were rescued by HMS Curlew (Royal Navy). |
| Bliss | United Kingdom | The ship sank at Swansea, Glamorgan. |
| Brazilian | Flag unknown | The ship was abandoned before 10 December. Her crew survived. She was on a voyage from Antwerp, Belgium to Buenos Aires, Argentina. |
| Britannia | United Kingdom | The schooner was driven ashore near Beaumaris, Anglesey. She was on a voyage from Runcorn, Cheshire to Port Dinorwic, Caernarfonshire. |
| Carmace | United States | The ship was driven ashore. She was on a voyage from Aspinwall, United States of Colombia to Savannah, Georgia. She was refloated and taken into Key West, Florida in a leaky condition. |
| Charente | United Kingdom | The steamship foundered in the North Sea between 7 and 10 December with the loss of all twenty crew. A lifeboat was discovered 35 nautical miles (65 km) east of Lowestoft, Suffolk in a capsized condition. She was on a voyage from Hull, Yorkshire to Dunkirk, Nord, France. |
| Charles Wood | United Kingdom | The ship was driven ashore in the Bay of Fundy. She was on a voyage from Sackville, New Brunswick, Canada to an English port. |
| Charlotte | United Kingdom | The ship ran aground on the Longsand, in the North Sea off the coast of Essex. She was refloated but consequently foundered. Her crew were rescued by the smack Tryal (United Kingdom). |
| Chief | Canada | The ship ran aground at Sydney, Nova Scotia. She was on a voyage from Cow Bay, Nova Scotia to Havana, Cuba. She was refloated. |
| Chieftain | United Kingdom | The ship was abandoned in a waterlogged condition before 9 December. Her crew were rescued by Tyne Queen (United Kingdom). Chieftain was on a voyage from Miramichi, New Brunswick to Liverpool. |
| Clansman | United Kingdom | The barque capsized off St. Steven's Head before 2 December with the loss of all ten crew. She was on a voyage from Riga, Russia to Alloa, Clackmannanshire. |
| Confidence and Klender | United Kingdom | The ship was driven ashore at the Hurst Castle, Hampshire. She was refloated. |
| Counsellor | United Kingdom | The steamship was presumed to have foundered with the loss of all twenty crew. |
| Dakotah | United Kingdom | The ship was abandoned in the Atlantic Ocean. Her crew were rescued. She was on a voyage from Quebec City to Liverpool. |
| Duffus | United States | The ship was severely damaged by fire at Charleston, South Carolina. |
| E. H. Duval | United States | The ship ran aground in the Delaware River. She was on a voyage from Boston, Massachusetts to Philadelphia, Pennsylvania. |
| Erme | United Kingdom | The ship was driven ashore in Mossel Bay. |
| Faith | United Kingdom | The ship was lost on Prince Island, in the Sunda Strait. |
| Fanny | United Kingdom | The ship was driven ashore on Norderney, Germany. She was on a voyage from Gothenburg, Sweden to Bridgwater, Somerset. |
| Felinn | United Kingdom | The ship foundered in the Irish Sea off the coast of Cumberland. |
| Flying Cloud | United Kingdom | The brig was run into by a French schooner and sank between 24 and 31 December. Her crew were rescued. She was on a voyage from Plymouth, Devon to Barcelona, Spain. |
| Formosa | United Kingdom | The ship was driven ashore at Bic, Quebec, Canada. She was on a voyage from Quebec City to London. She was refloated on 27 April 1873 and towed into Quebec City. |
| Gustave Emilie | France | The brig foundered off Strumble Head, Pembrokeshire, United Kingdom with the loss of all hands. |
| Haitienne | Flag unknown | The ship was abandoned in the Atlantic Ocean before 26 December. Her crew were rescued. She was on a voyage from Boston, Massachusetts to Cape Town, Cape Colony. |
| Howard | United Kingdom | The barque foundered in the English Channel off the cost of Dorset with the loss of all sixteen crew. She was on a voyage from the River Tyne to Martinique. Wreckage from the ship washed up a Swanage on 28 December. |
| Illustrious | United Kingdom | The ship was abandoned on the Atlantic Ocean 400 nautical miles (740 km) off Cape Clear Island, County Cork. Her crew were rescued by the schooner Gleaner (United Kingdom. |
| Island Queen | United Kingdom | The dandy rigged smack foundered in the North Sea with the loss of all twelve crew. |
| Jamsetjee Cursetjee Bottlebhoe | United Kingdom | The ship was wrecked on Slipper Island, Cocos Islands. |
| Jane and Mary | United Kingdom | The brig was abandoned in the North Sea before 10 December. |
| J. W. Wilson | United Kingdom | The ship was wrecked. |
| Lady Lopez | United Kingdom | The smack foundered in the North Sea with the loss of all hands. |
| Lass of Gowrie | United Kingdom | The ship foundered off the coast of Belgium. |
| Lesbia | United Kingdom | The ship foundered in the Atlantic Ocean before 10 December. Her crew were rescued. She was on a voyage from Quebec City to Newcastle upon Tyne, Northumberland. |
| Lizette | United Kingdom | The ship ran aground on the Goodwin Sands, Kent and was abandoned. Her crew were rescued. She was on a voyage from Hamburg, Germany to Africa. She was later refloated and taken into Great Yarmouth, Norfolk. |
| Lothair | United Kingdom | The ship was abandoned in the Atlantic Ocean 400 nautical miles (740 km) west of Cape Clear Island. Her crew were rescued by Annie Lorway ( Canada). Lothair was on a voyage from Miramichi to Gloucester. |
| Lottie E. | United Kingdom | The schooner was driven ashore and severely damaged at Bass Harbor, Maine, United States. She was on a voyage from Saint George, New Brunswick to Jamaica. |
| Mabella | United Kingdom | The ship was driven ashore in the Clyde. She was refloated. |
| Macleod | United Kingdom | The barque was abandoned in the Atlantic Ocean 200 nautical miles (370 km) off Faial Island, Azores. She was on a voyage from Quebec City to Dublin. |
| Marie | United Kingdom | The schooner was driven ashore at Fraserburgh, Aberdeenshire. She was on a voyage from Dunkirk to Aberdeen. |
| M. B. Almon | United States | The ship was wrecked at Cow Bay before 14 December. |
| New Dominion | Canada | The brig departed from Cow Bay for Yarmouth, Maine, United States. She subsequently struck a rock off the Canadian coast and foundered with the loss of all hands. |
| Noah | United Kingdom | The barque was abandoned at sea before 27 December. |
| Norge | Norway | The steamship was driven ashore. She was on a voyage from Stockholm, Sweden to London, United Kingdom. She was refloated and taken into Gothenburg. |
| Nouvelle Antoinette | France | The ship struck the Diamond Rock, off Réunion and was beached. She was on a voyage from Réunion to Cádiz, Spain. |
| Ocean Gem | United Kingdom | The ship was driven ashore at Bic. She was on a voyage from Montreal, Quebec to London. She was refloated on 28 April 1873 and towed into Quebec City. |
| Oneida | United Kingdom | The ship was wrecked at Cape Ray, Newfoundland Colony. She was on a voyage from Quebec City to Valperaíso, Chile. |
| Ontario | United Kingdom | The barque was abandoned in the Atlantic Ocean before 22 December. |
| Oranen | Norway | The barque foundered. Her twelve crew were rescued by the steamship Steinmann (Germany). |
| Paul | Germany | The ship was driven ashore at Travemünde. She was on a voyage from Sundsvall, Sweden to Lübeck. She was refloated. |
| Phœnix | United Kingdom | The smack foundered in the North Sea with the loss of all twelve crew. |
| Pride of the Ocean | United Kingdom | The barque was abandoned in the Atlantic Ocean. Her crew were rescued by Tinto (United Kingdom). |
| Princess Louise | Canada | The brig foundered. Her crew survived. |
| Priory | United Kingdom | The ship was driven ashore at Ouistreham, Calvados, France. |
| Redan | United Kingdom | The barque was abandoned in the Atlantic Ocean (44°31′N 35°24′W). She was on a voyage from Quebec City to London. |
| Rising Sun | United Kingdom | The fishing boat foundered off Kincardine, Fife with the loss of all four crew. |
| Royal Oak | United Kingdom | The smack foundered in the North Sea with the loss of all six crew. |
| Sailor | United Kingdom | The ship was driven ashore at "Walsoorde". She was on a voyage from Antwerp to London. She was refloated. |
| Sarah Ellen | United Kingdom | The ship was wrecked near Nuevitas, Cuba. She was on a voyage from Liverpool to Nuevitas. |
| Saucy Lass | United Kingdom | The smack foundered in the North Sea with the loss of all eleven crew. |
| Sceptre | United Kingdom | The smack foundered in the North Sea with the loss of all hands. |
| Scotland | United Kingdom | The ship was abandoned before 4 December. Her crew were rescued. She was on a voyage from Port Caledonia, Nova Scotia, Canada to Demerara, British Honduras. |
| Statesman | United Kingdom | The smack foundered in the North Sea with the loss of all six crew. |
| Wallace | United Kingdom | The ship capsized with the loss of all hands. She was on a voyage from Newport, Monmouthshire to Gibraltar. She was towed into Cardiff in a capsized condition on 20 December. |
| Wellesley | United Kingdom | The ship was wrecked in the Hooghly River before 6 December. Her crew were rescued. |
| William B. | (Canada) | The schooner was wrecked on Scatarie Island, Nova Scotia before 19 December with the loss of two of her crew. |
| Xantho | Western Australia | The steamship sank. |
