= Thue Christiansen =

Designer of the Greenlandic flag (1940–2022)

- The flag of Greenland, designed by Christiansen
- Born: February 25, 1940; Maamorilik, Greenland
- Died: June 26, 2022 (aged 82); Hals, Denmark
- Citizenship: Greenlandic
- Occupations: Politician, teacher, visual artist
- Political party: Siumut

Thue Christiansen (25 February 1940 – 26 June 2022) was a Greenlandic politician, teacher, and visual artist. He is best known as the designer of the flag of Greenland, which was adopted on 21 June 1985. A trained teacher, Christiansen was elected to the Inatsisartut for Siumut in 1979, when Greenland was granted home rule. He was the Greenlandic Minister of Culture and Education from 1979 until 1983.

Christiansen died on 26 June 2022, at his home in Hals, Denmark. He was 82.
