= Hals, Denmark =

Town in Denmark

Hals
- Town
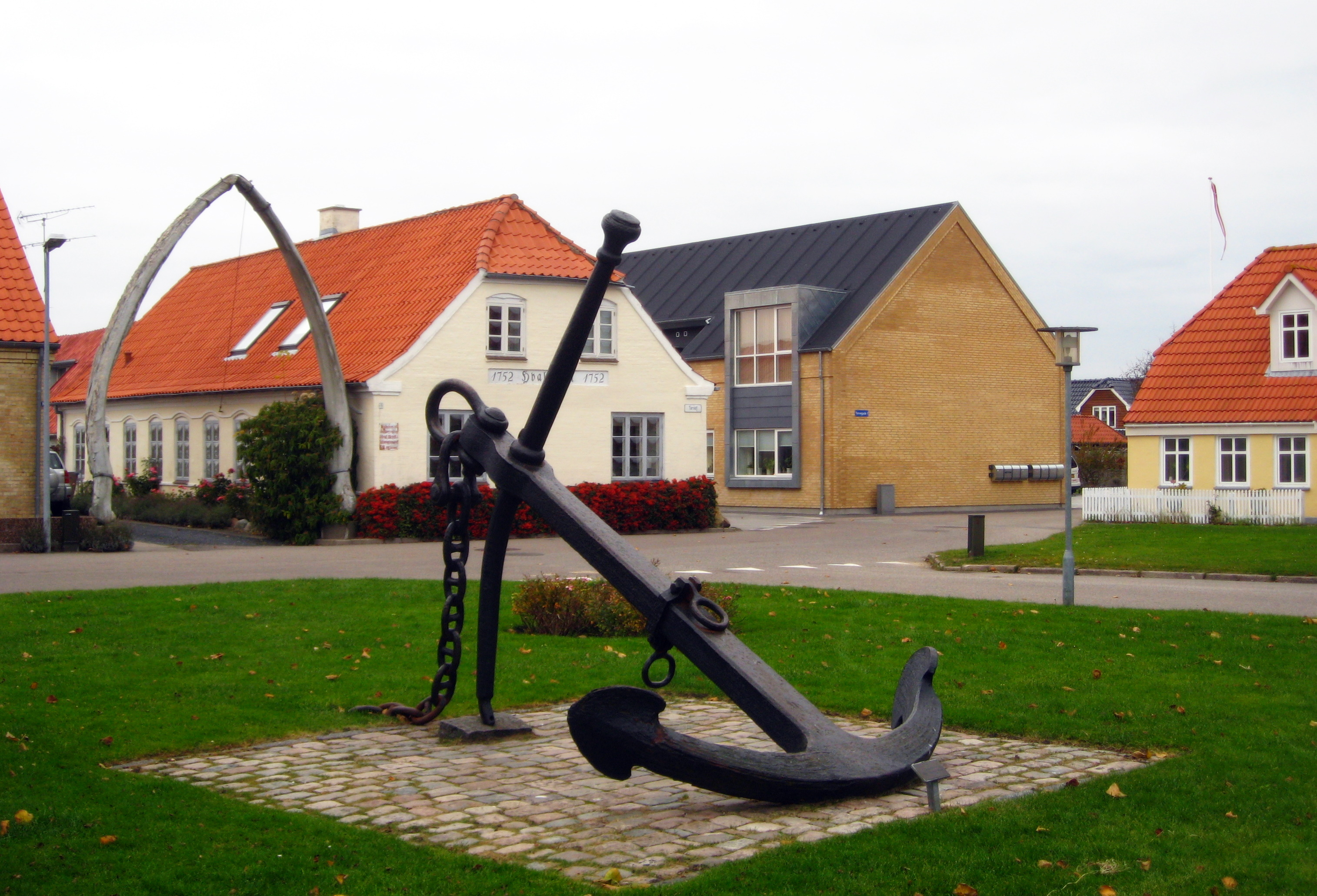
- The "Whale Jaws" and the anchor in the town square

- Location in Denmark Hals (North Jutland Region)
- Coordinates: 56°59′54″N 10°18′34″E
- Country: Denmark
- Region: Region Nordjylland
- Municipality: Aalborg Municipality

Area
  - Urban: 1.61 km^{2} (0.62 sq mi)

Population (2026)
  - Urban: 2,382
  - Urban density: 1,480/km^{2} (3,830/sq mi)
  - Gender: 1,134 males and 1,248 females
- Time zone: UTC+1 (CET)
  - Summer (DST): UTC+2 (CEST)
- Postal code: DK-9370 Hals

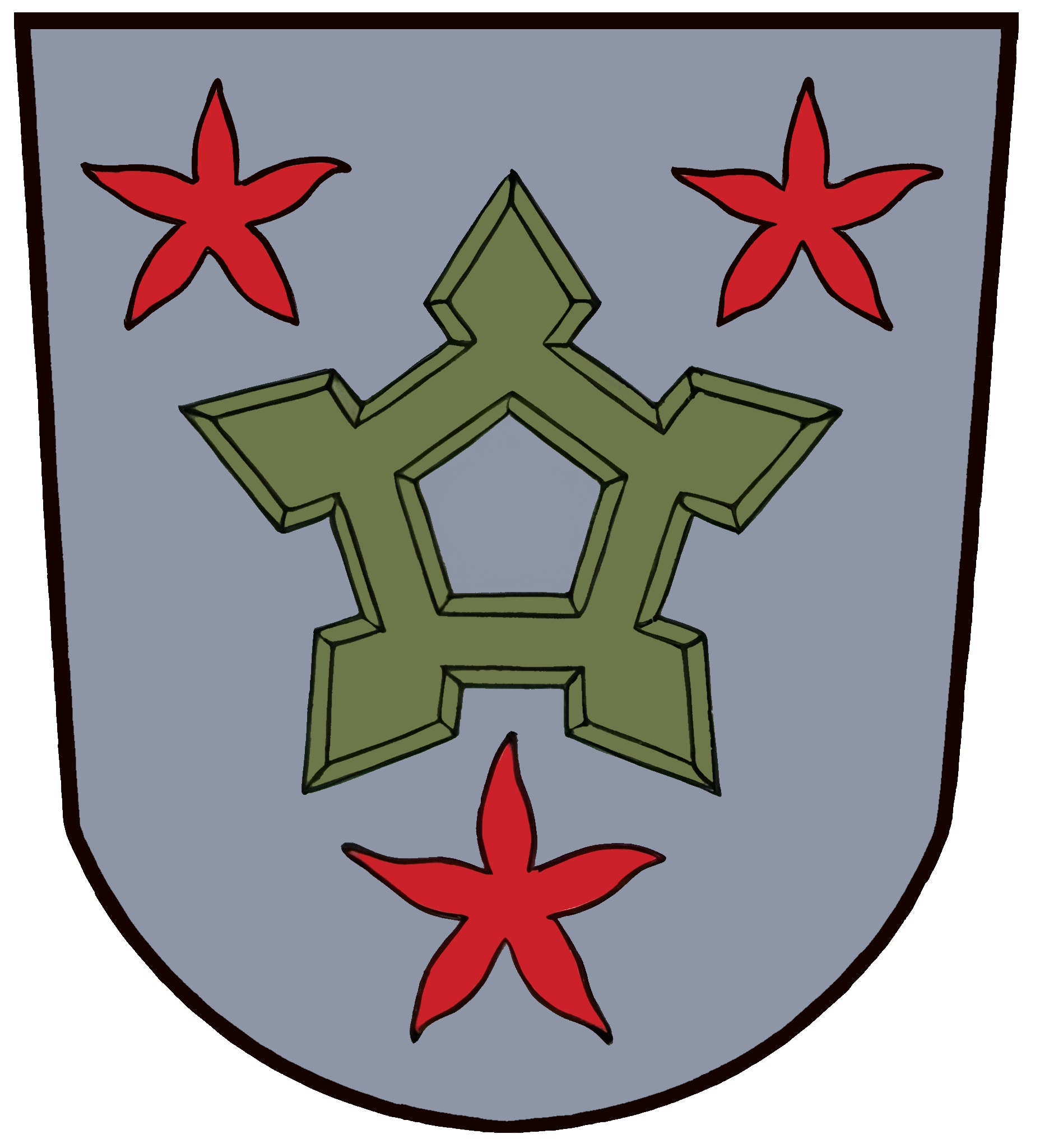
Coat of arms of Hals.

Hals is a harbour and tourist town with a population of 2,382 (1 January 2026) in Region Nordjylland's Aalborg Municipality on the east coast of the Jutland peninsula in northern Denmark.

== Notable people ==
- Jens Bloch (1761 in Hals – 1830) a Danish theologian and priest, a Bishop in both Norway (briefly) and Denmark
- Thue Christiansen (1940–2022), Greenlandic teacher, visual artist, and politician who designed the Flag of Greenland lived in and died in Hals
- Søren Wulff Johansson (born 1971 in Hals) a Danish former decathlete; received a lifetime ban from sport after twice failing doping tests
- Harald Greycloak was also murdered here

== Gallery ==
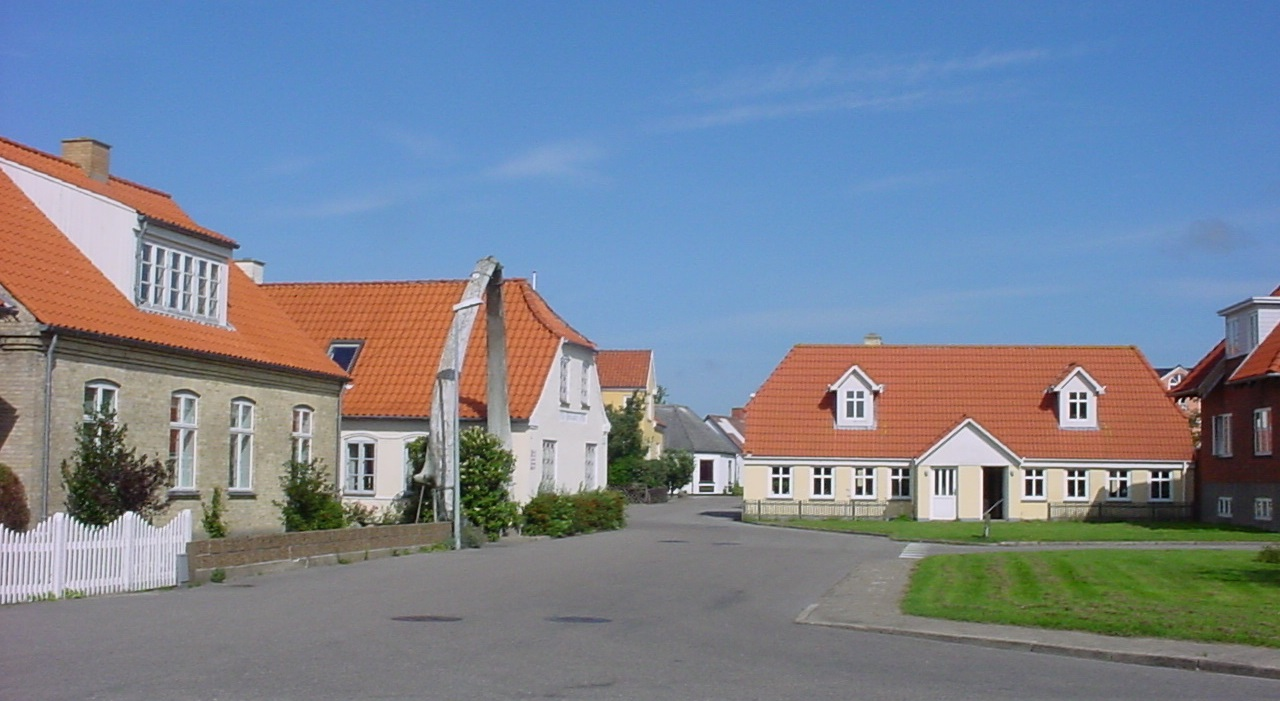
The center of Hals

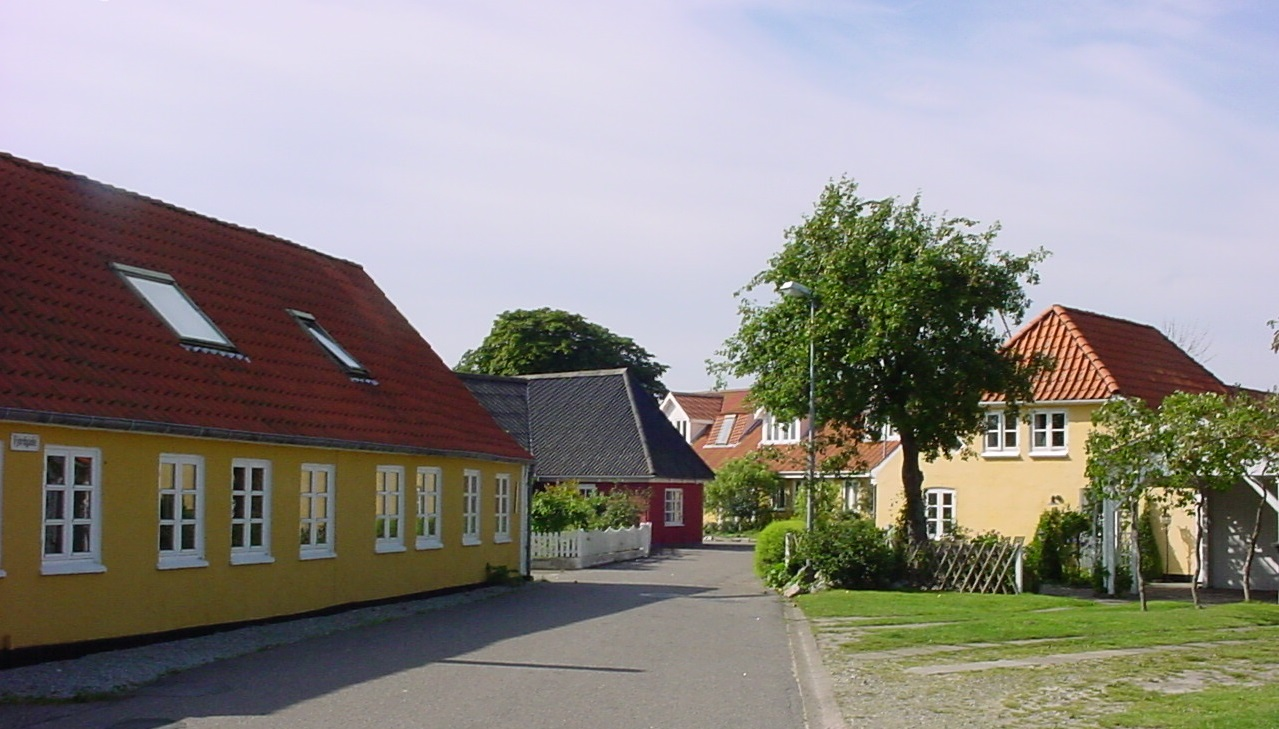
Street in Hals

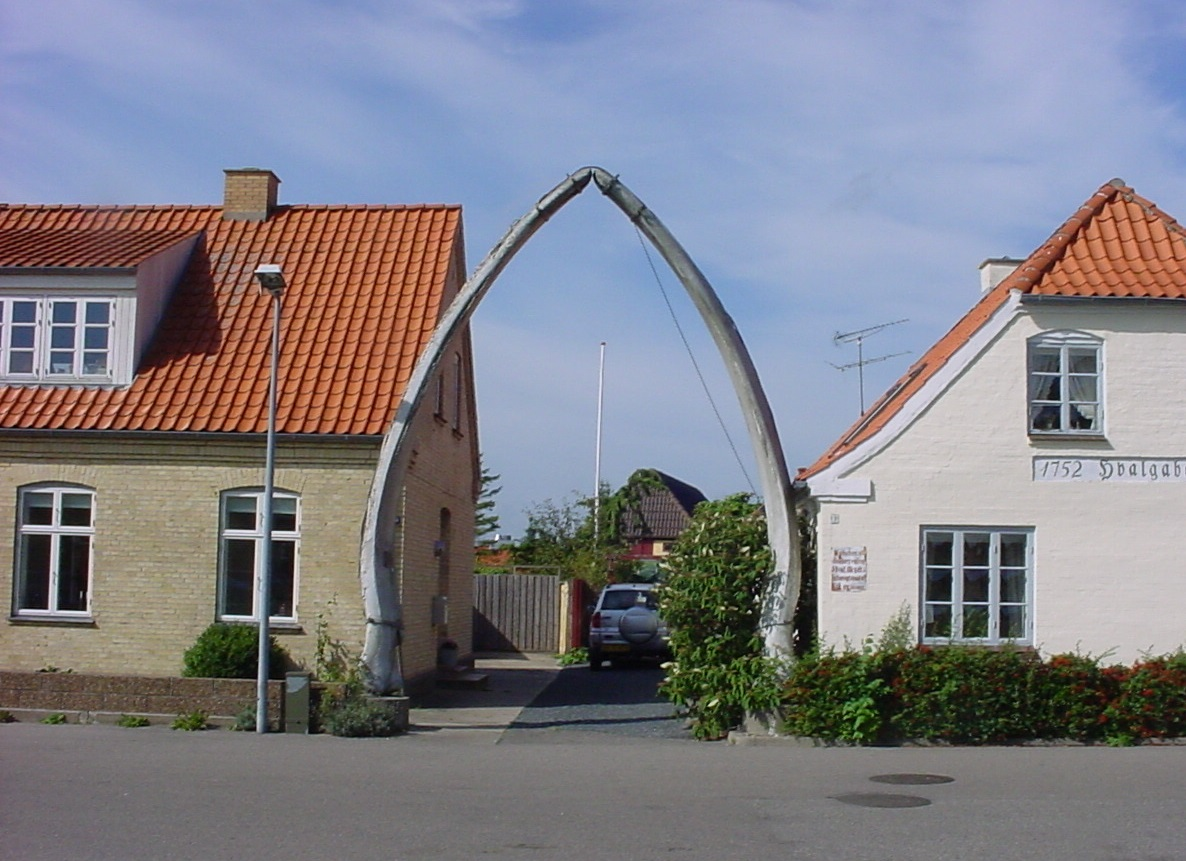
The Whale Jaw in Hals

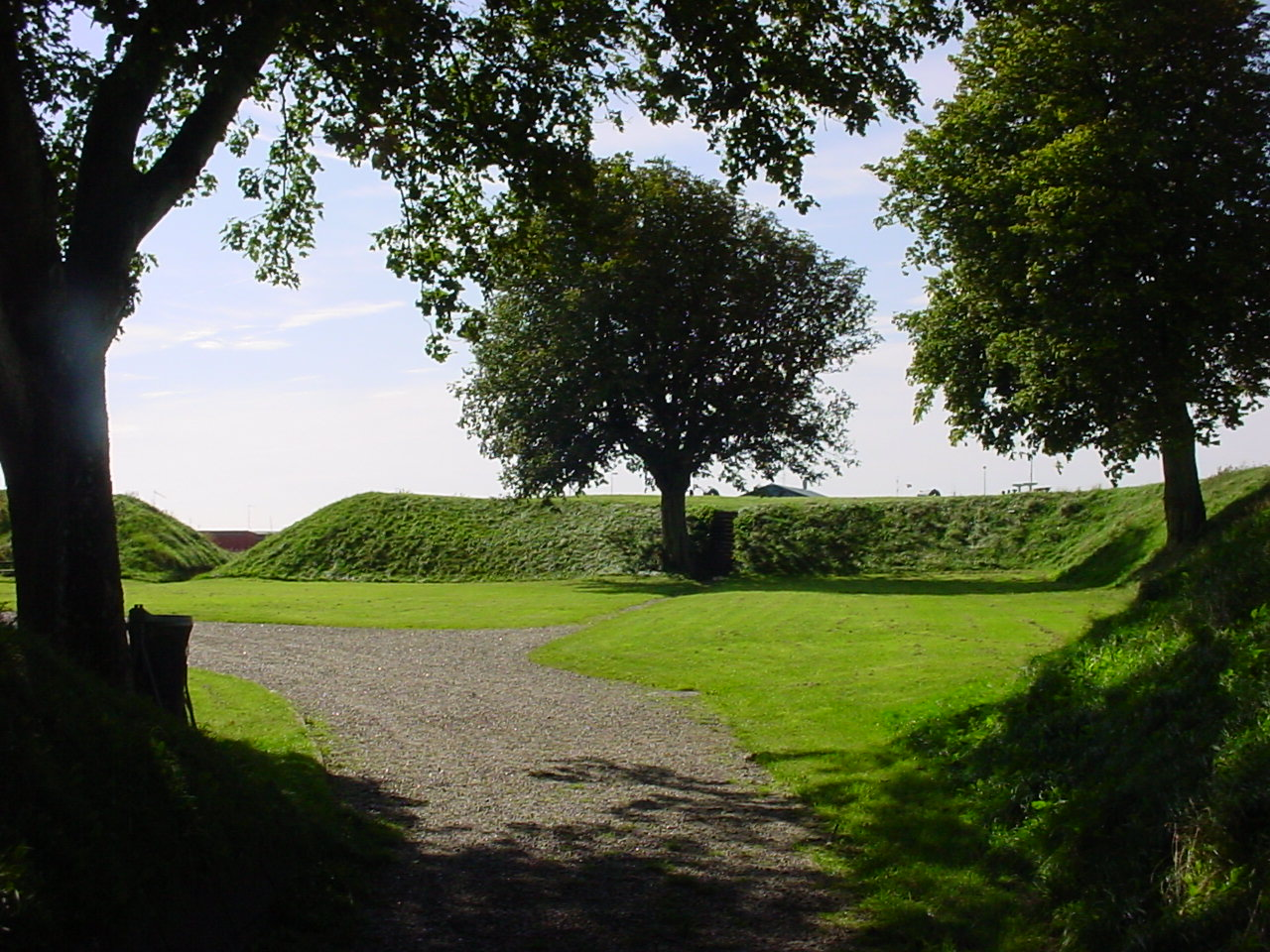
Hals Fort at the inside

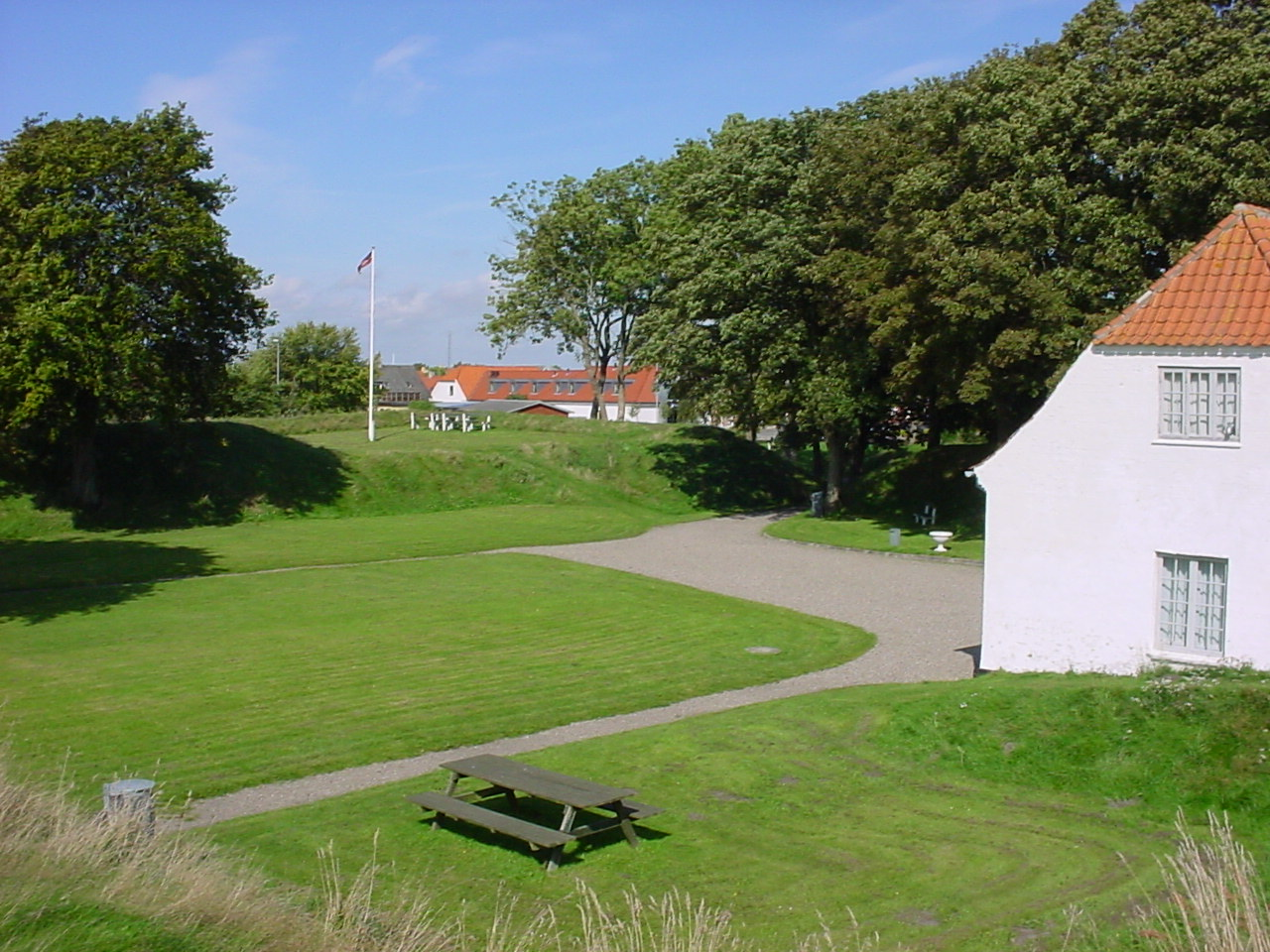
Hals Fort at the inside
