= Panmure Island Provincial Park =

Provincial park in Prince Edward Island, Canada

Coordinates: 46°8′24.6″N 62°28′11.9″W

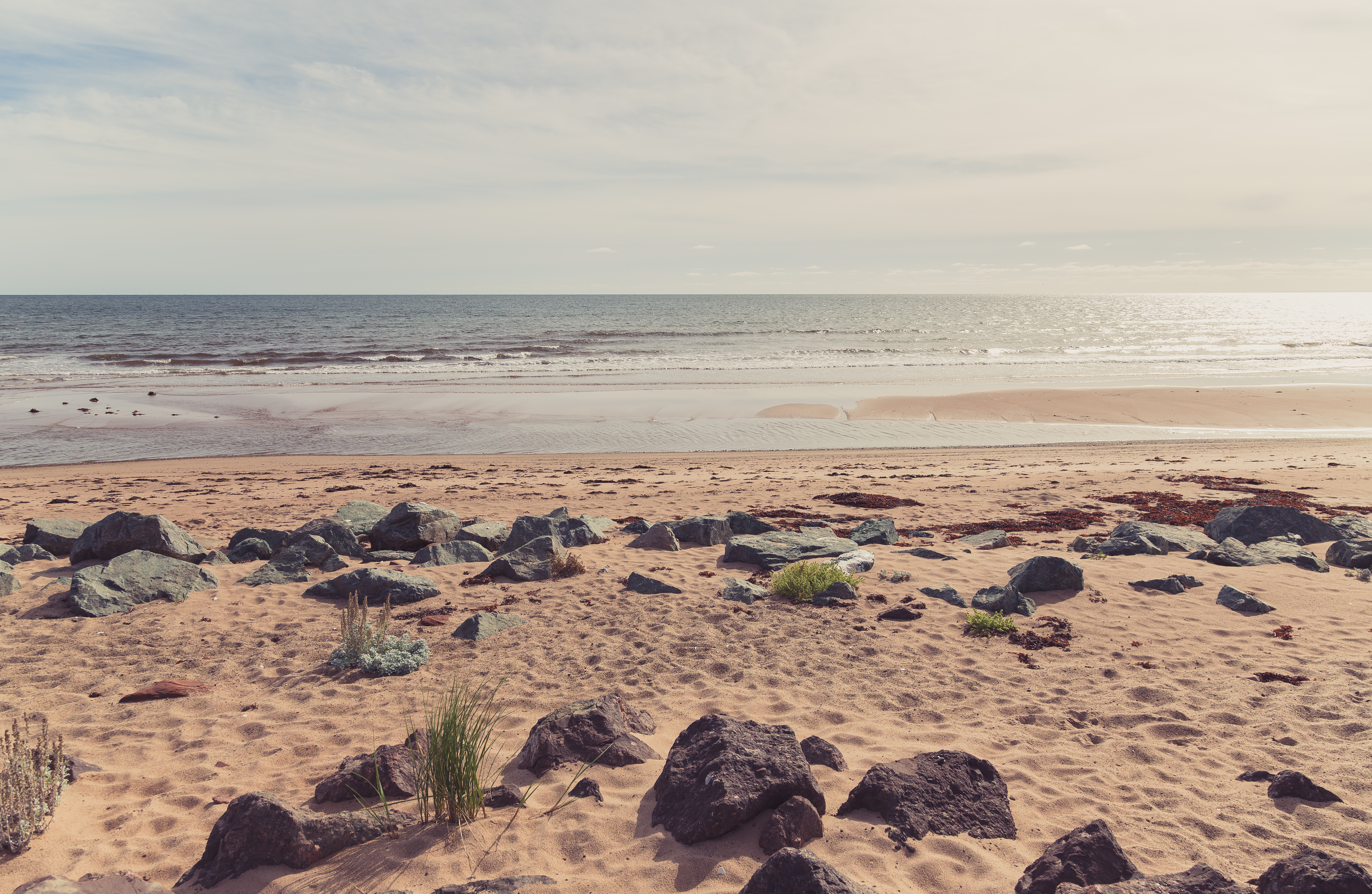
Beach at Panmure Island Provincial Park

Panmure Island Provincial Park is a provincial park in Prince Edward Island, Canada. It is located along a causeway connecting Prince Edward Island with Panmure Island. The Native Council of Prince Edward Island hosts their annual Abegweit Pow Wow in the park.
