= Sparta (athletic club) =

Danish athletics club

- Full name: Sparta Atletik
- Founded: November 8, 1898
- Ground: Østerbro Stadion (stadium); Copenhagen

Sparta Atletik (Danish: Sparta Atletik og Løb) is a Danish track and field club, and one of the leading clubs in Denmark.

The club is known for winning the major part of the individual medals at the Danish championships, and having the most athletes represented on the different national teams.

The most famous athlete ever to have represented Sparta is the former 800 metres world record-holder and current 1000 and 800 metres distance indoors world record-holder Wilson Kipketer, who won gold medals representing Sparta in three successive editions of the IAAF World Championships in Athletics, and took medals at the 2000 Summer Olympics in Sydney and 2004 Summer Olympics in Athens. Kipketer's 800 meters world record on an outdoor track stood undefeated for almost 13 years.

== Other famous athletes ==
- Piotr Buciarski
- Mogens Guldberg
- Juliane Hvid
- Dennis Jensen
- Morten Jensen
- Christina Scherwin
- Rikke Rønholt
- Søren Wulff Johansson
