= Søren Wulff Johansson =

Danish decathlete (1971–2020)

- Born: 26 August 1971; Hals, Denmark
- Died: 8 August 2020 (aged 48); Borup, Køge Municipality, Denmark
- Occupation: former decathlete

Søren Wulff Johansson (26 August 1971 – 8 August 2020) was a Danish decathlete. He was the first Danish person to receive a lifetime ban from sport, after failing doping tests for anabolic steroids in 1989 and 1995.

Johansson was a two-time Danish Athletics Championships winner. He was the athletics pentathlon champion in 1994 and the decathlon champion in 1995. His personal best performance in the decathlon was 6982 points.

He was a member of several athletics clubs: Aalborg AK until 1989, Trongården in the 1991/1992 season, Sparta in 1993 and Copenhagen Idræts Forening 1994/1995.

== National titles ==
- Danish Athletics Championships
  - Pentathlon: 1994
  - Decathlon: 1995
