= Rikke Rønholt =

Danish athlete (born 1976)

Personal information
- Born: 1 January 1976 (age 50) Copenhagen, Denmark

Sport
- Sport: Track and field
Medal record
Representing Denmark
European U23 Championships
Gold medal – first place	1997 Turku	400m hurdles

Rikke Michala Rønholt-Albertsen (born 1 January 1976) is a Danish athlete. She is a part of Sparta Athletics team.

She started doing athletics when she was 12 years old. Back then she participated in events from 60 metres to heptathlon and shot put. When she ran her first 400 metres hurdles she was less than a second from qualifying for the European Junior Championships.

Rønholt competed for the Florida State Seminoles track and field team in the NCAA.

She represents Sparta. She competed at the 1997 World Championships, the European Championships in 2002 and 2006 and the European Indoor Championships in 2005 and 2007.

== Records ==
Danish senior records:

- 400 metres 52.84 s
- 400 metres hurdles (76,2 cm) 57.04 s
- 4 × 400 metres 3:38,65 min. 23-06-2001

Danish senior records indoor:

- 400 metres 54.71 s

Danish U-23 records:

- 400 metres 54.22 s
- 400 metres hurdles (76,2 cm) 57.04 s

Danish junior records:

- 400 metres 54.75 s
- 400 metres hurdles (76,2 cm) 57.71 s
