= Panmure Island, Prince Edward Island =

Panmure Island
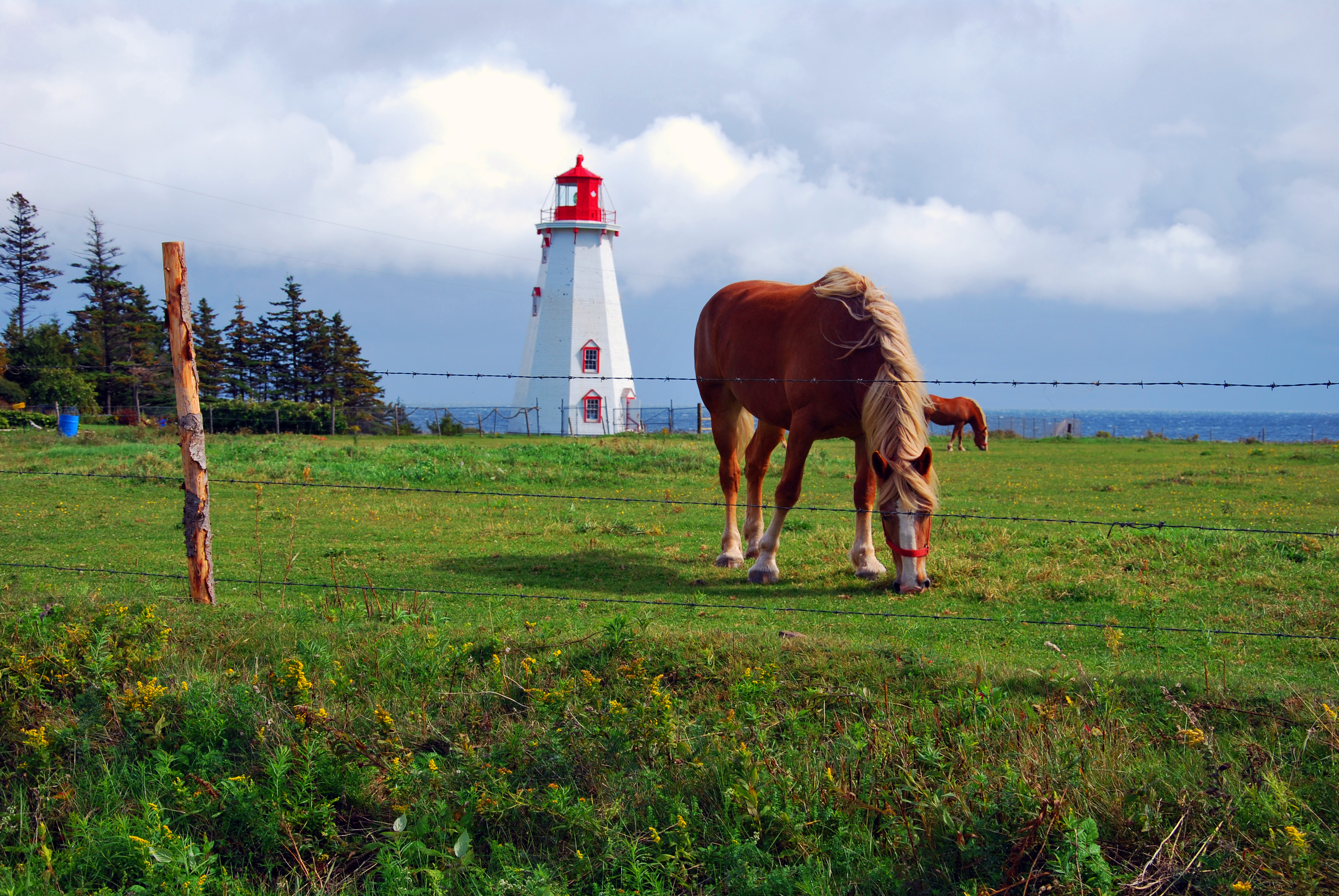
- Panmure Island Lighthouse, Prince Edward Island 2009

- Location in PEI
- Coordinates: 46°08′28″N 62°29′08″W
- Country: Canada
- Province: Prince Edward Island
- County: Kings
- Township: Lot 61
- Time zone: UTC-4 (Atlantic Time Zone)
  - Summer (DST): UTC-3 (Atlantic Time Zone)
- Postal Code: C0A 1R0
- Area codes: 902, 782

Panmure Island is a Canadian rural community in Lot 61 township in Kings County, Prince Edward Island.

The community is situated upon Panmure Island and derives its name from this island.

The community is home to several year-round residents but hosts numerous visitors in the summer months when its many cottages are fully occupied.
