= Panmure Island (Prince Edward Island) =

Canadian island

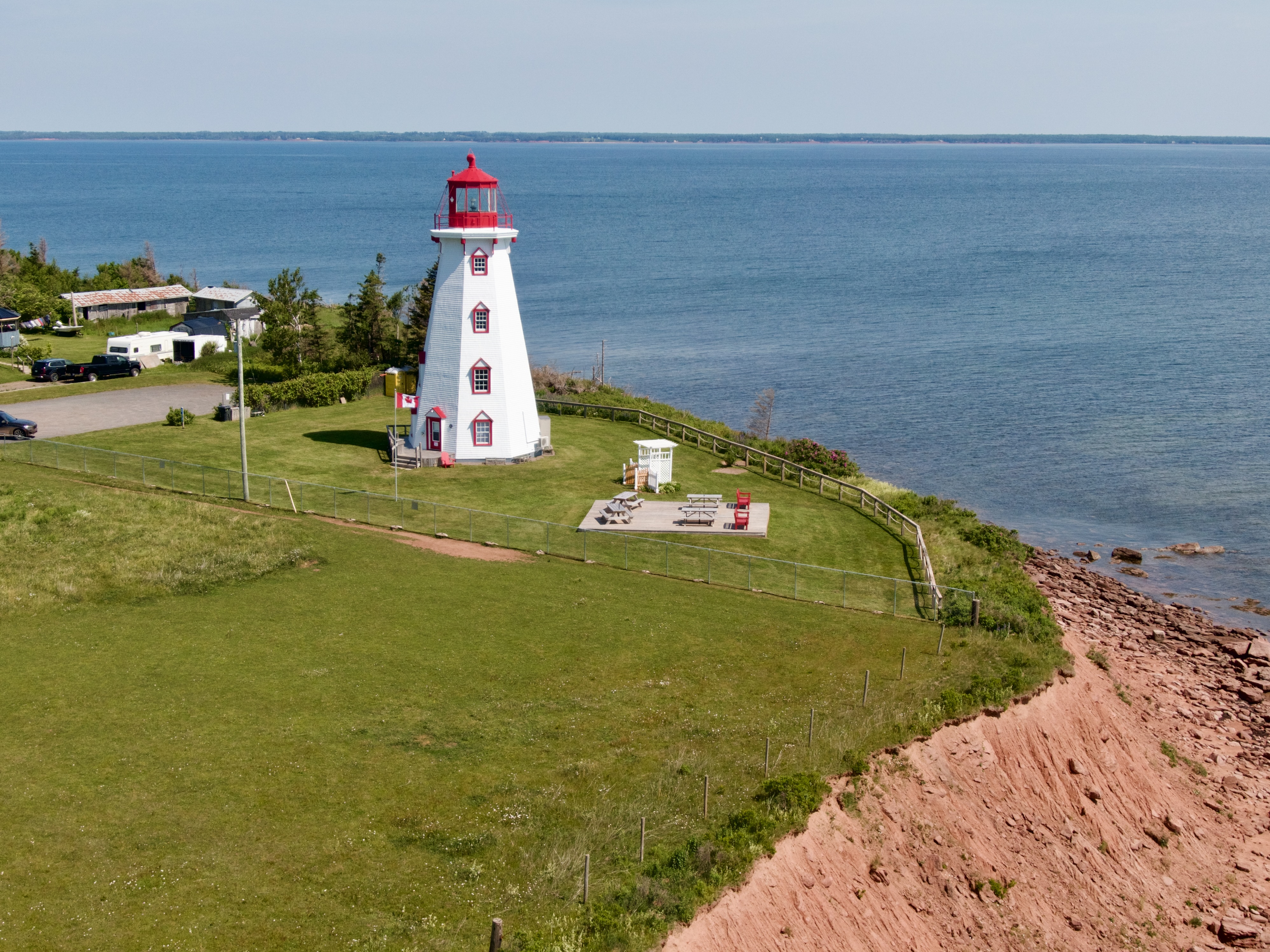
- Panmure Head Lighthouse

- Location within Prince Edward Island

Geography
- Location: Northumberland Strait
- Coordinates: 46°08′31″N 62°28′59″W
- Area: 323.75 ha (800.0 acres)

Administration
- Canada
- Province: Prince Edward Island
- County: Kings
- Township: Lot 61

Additional information
- Time zone: Atlantic Time Zone (UTC-4)
  - Summer (DST): Atlantic Time Zone (UTC-3)

Panmure Island is a small 800-acre (324 ha) island of Canadian red sandstone island, with sand beaches, located off the east coast of Prince Edward Island in the Lot 61 township in Kings County.

The island is located about 1 kilometre (0.62 mi) from the nearest point on Prince Edward Island.

The first visitors to Panmure Island were the Mi'kmaq, who came to the island in the summer months to dig clams, mussels and quahaugs. The first full-time inhabitants of the island were settlers from Scotland, the first of which is believed to have been Andrew MacDonald and his family in 1805. The Panmure Island Cemetery was established in 1813.

Panmure Island was connected to Prince Edward Island by sand bars at low tide; however, since the 1960s, an artificial causeway has carried a road to the island. The causeway also created an extensive barrier beach and sand dune formation, which is now protected by Panmure Island Provincial Park; this park is not actually located on the island but along the causeway. The causeway has faced increased wave erosion in recent years. The provincial government has spent a significant amount to preserve the connection despite rising sea levels and increased storms.

The island contains the oldest wooden lighthouse on Prince Edward Island, near the northern end of the causeway. Built in 1853, the historic 18-metre-high (59 ft) lighthouse structure has gabled windows and four stories with a warning beacon atop. It sits on the northeast shore alerting ships of the dangerous shoals that have been responsible for several shipwrecks in the region. Tours of the lighthouse are available in the summer months.

A school was built on the island in 1897 for $150, and had a total of seven pupils the first year.

The island is home to the community of Panmure Island, which derives its name from the island.

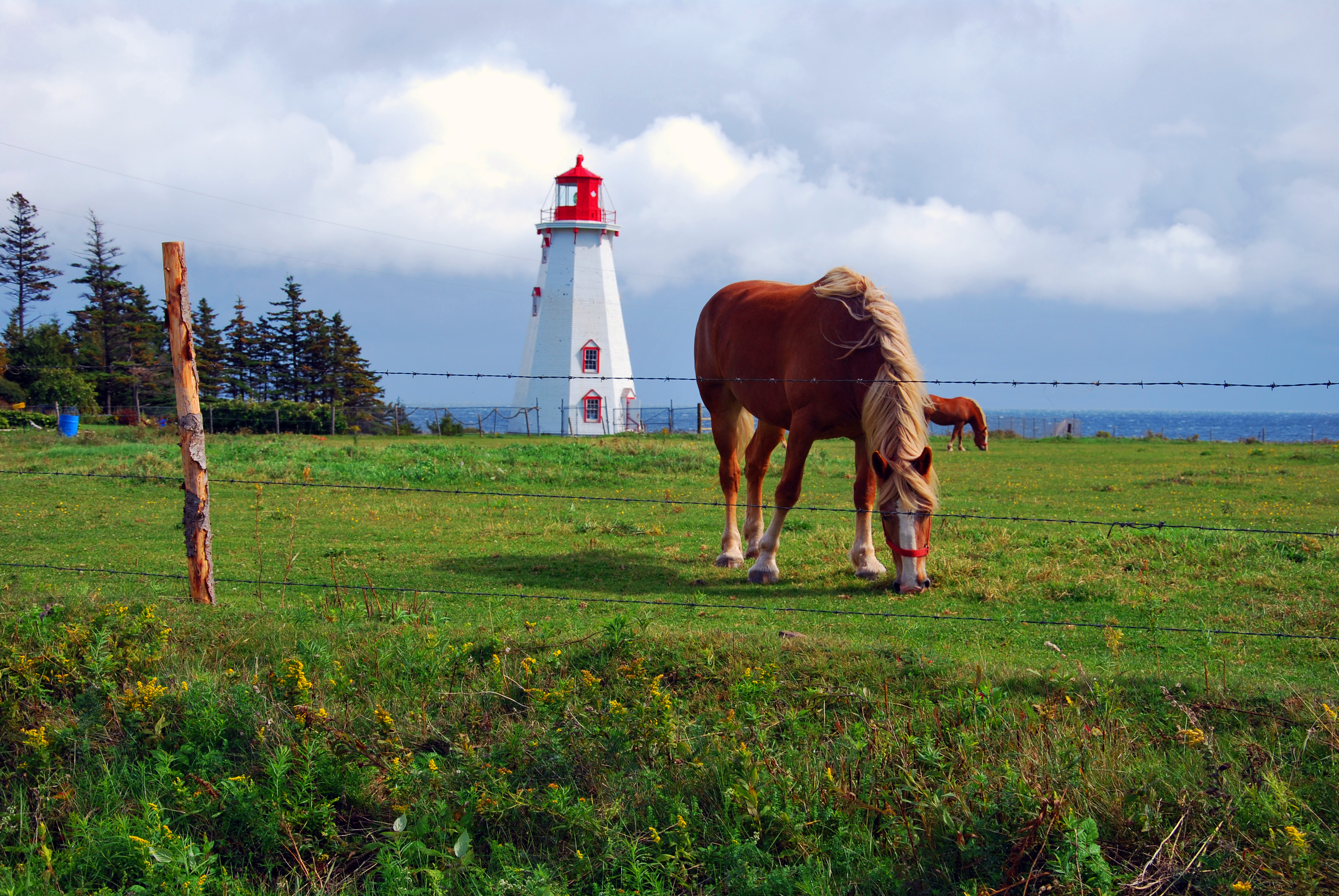
Haflinger horse at Panmure Head Lighthouse
