= Flag of Greenland =

Greenland
- Other names: Erfalasorput ("our flag"), Aappalaartoq ("the red")
- Use: National flag and civil ensign
- Proportion: 2:3
- Adopted: 21 June 1985
- Design: A horizontal bicolour of white and red, with a counterchanged disk slightly off-centre towards the hoist.
- Designed by: Thue Christiansen

The flag of Greenland (Note: Greenlandic: Kalaallit erfalasuat, colloquially Erfalasorput or Aappalaartoq; Danish: Grønlands flag) features two equal horizontal bands of white (top) and red (bottom) with a counter-changed red-and-white disc slightly to the hoist side of centre. The entire flag measures 18 by 12 parts; each stripe measures six parts; the disc is eight parts in diameter, horizontally offset by seven parts from the hoist to the centre of the circle, and vertically centred. It was designed by Greenlandic politician Thue Christiansen. The territory of Greenland is an autonomous part of the Kingdom of Denmark.

Its local name in the Greenlandic language is Erfalasorput, which means "our flag". The term Aappalaartoq (meaning "the red") is also used for both the Greenlandic flag and the flag of Denmark (Dannebrog). Today, Greenlanders display both the Erfalasorput and the Dannebrog—often side by side. The flag of Greenland is the only national flag of a Nordic country or territory without a Nordic cross, but is similar to the cultural Sámi flag, which also features a circular design and counterchanging of field and charge.

== History ==
Greenland first entertained the idea of a flag of its own in 1973 when five Greenlanders proposed a green, white and blue flag. The following year, a newspaper solicited 11 design proposals (all but one of which was a Nordic cross) and polled the people to determine the most popular.

Construction sheet of the flag of Greenland, with colours and proportions

The deciding committee could not come to a consensus, so more proposals were solicited. Finally, the present red-and-white design by Thue Christiansen narrowly won over a green-and-white Nordic cross by a vote of 14 to 11. Christiansen's red-and-white flag was officially adopted on 21 June 1985.

To honour the 10th anniversary of the flag, the Greenland Post Office issued commemorative postage stamps and a leaflet by the flag's creator. He described the white stripe as representing the glaciers and ice cap, which cover more than 80% of the island; the red stripe, the ocean; the red semicircle, the sun, with its bottom part sunk in the ocean; and the white semicircle, the icebergs and pack ice. The design is also reminiscent of the setting Sun half-submerged below the horizon and reflected on the sea. In 1985, it was reported that Greenland's flag had exactly the same motif as the flag of the Danish rowing club HEI Rosport, which was founded before Greenland's flag was chosen. It is not clear whether this is a case of plagiarism or just a coincidence, but the rowing club gave Greenland permission to use their flag.

The colours of the flag are the same as those of the flag of Denmark, symbolising Greenland's place in the Danish realm.

== Galleries ==
Photographs of the flag of Greenland
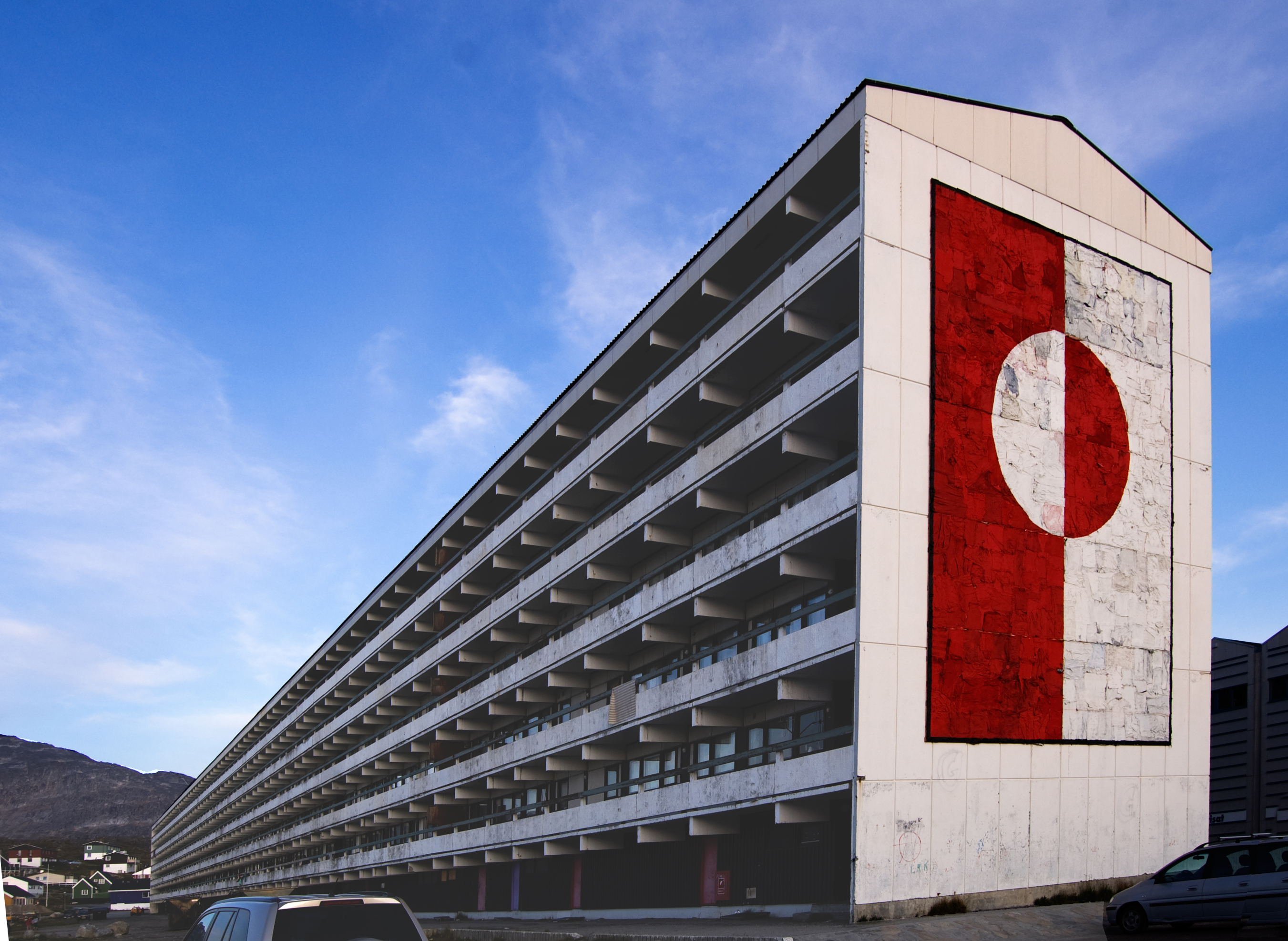
The flag of Greenland displayed vertically on the Blok P apartment block in Nuuk

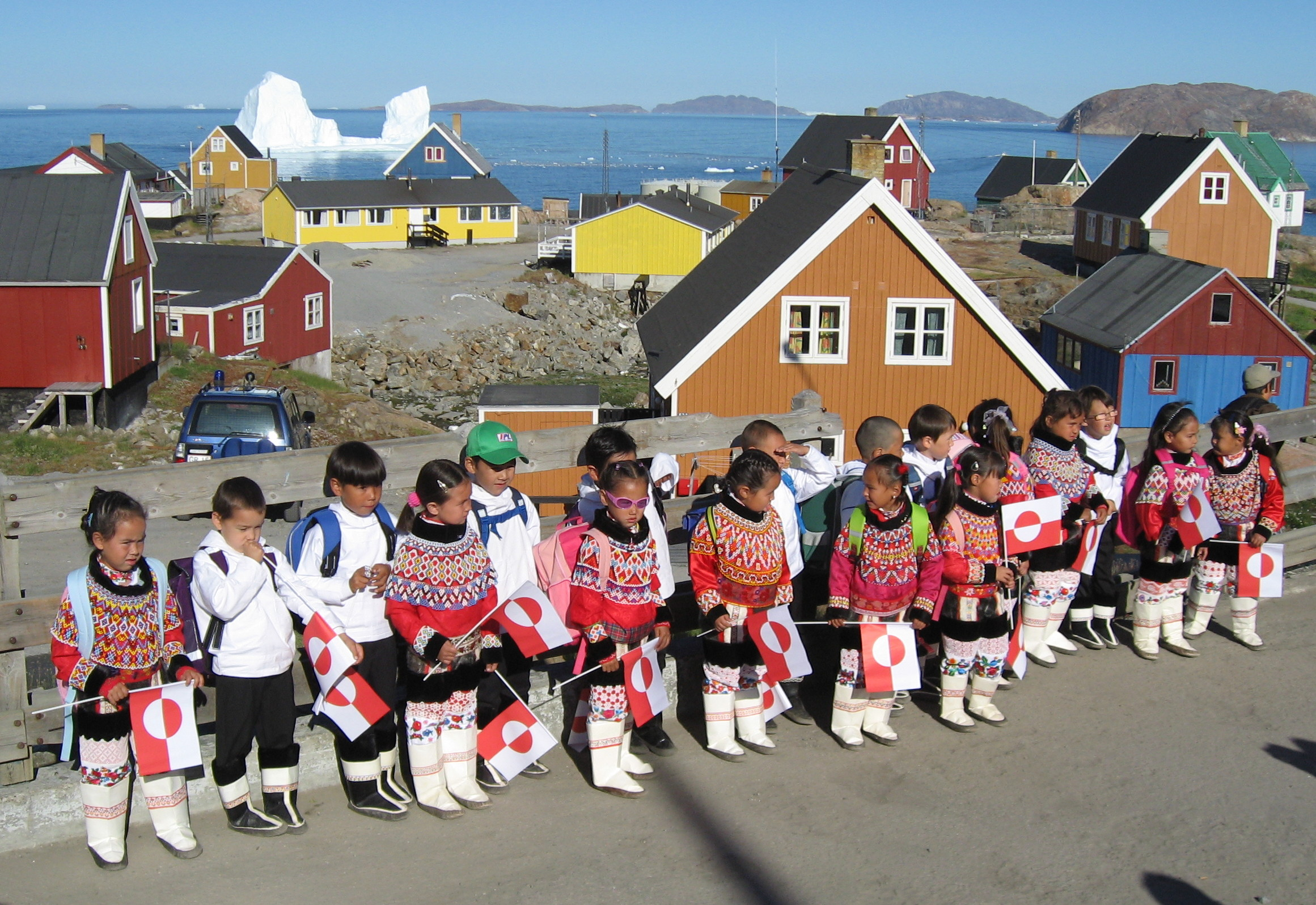
Schoolchildren in Upernavik with flags
Historical flags of Greenland
The flag of the Royal Greenland Trading Department used before 1908

The flag of Denmark was used before the Greenlandic flag became official.
Proposed flags of Greenland
The first proposed flag of Greenland (1973)

Proposed flag of Greenland by Stephen Petersen (1974)

Proposed flag of Greenland by Sven Tito Achen (1984)

Proposed flag of Greenland by Andersson (1991)

== See also ==
- Flag of Denmark
- Flag of the Faroe Islands
- List of flags of Denmark
- Raven banner
