= Montague Regional High School =

Location
- 274 Valleyfield Road; Montague, Prince Edward Island, C0A 1R0; Canada; 46°09′30″N 62°38′50″W

Information
- School type: Public High school
- Motto: "Maximus In Minimus"
- Founded: 2010
- School board: Public Schools Branch
- Superintendent: Cynthia Fleet
- Administrator: Kelly Matheson; Audra Bushey
- Principal: Robyn MacDonald
- Grades: 10-12
- Enrollment: 565 (2012)
- Language: English and French (immersion)
- Area: 108,000 square-feet
- Colours: Red and Black
- Mascot: Viking
- Team name: Montague Vikings
- Website: montaguehigh.edu.pe.ca

Montague Regional High School (MRHS), is a Canadian secondary school in Montague, Prince Edward Island for students from the southern part of Kings County and the south eastern part of Queens County, including the towns of Montague and Georgetown.

The school is administratively part of the Public Schools Branch. Its official colours are red and black and the mascot is a Viking. The sports teams from MRHS are called the Montague Vikings.

== History and characteristics ==
- In 1961, The original Montague Regional High School on Fraser Street was opened.
- In 2007, the Eastern School District voted unanimously to recommend a replacement for the old Montague Regional High School on Fraser Street.
- In 2010, students and staff moved into a $22 million new Montague Regional High School, located on the Valleyfield Road. The new Montague High has over 500 students, a teaching staff of over thirty-five, and twenty support staff. The new 108,000-square-foot (10,000 m^{2}) facility was officially opened on September 15 by Premier Robert Ghiz. During the grand opening events at the new High School, Premier Ghiz and Mr. Doug Currie (then the Minister of Education) marked the day by assisting Principal Seana Evans-Renaud with a ribbon cutting and tree planting ceremony.
- In 2011, Fair Isle Ford generously donating $20 for every test drive taken on April 20 to a maximum of $6000. The money raised was used to purchase equipment for MRHS. In addition, 10% of all money raised will be donated to Breast Cancer Research.

This school is considered to be one of the most advanced schools in Atlantic Canada. It is a model for trades in the province, and has state of the art career and technical education training facilities.

== Facilities ==
The school was designed with energy efficiency in mind and includes some of the following modern features:

- Four modern science labs with safe prep and chemical storage areas, one computer lab in addition to a food and clothing lab.
- A large, well managed, and well stocked library with an adjoining seminar room and four meeting rooms.
- A cafetorium featuring a large stage, prop area, and sound and lighting room.
- Spacious band and music room, a music library and listening room, five practice rooms and sound studio.
- Trades training includes large, well-equipped spaces for carpentry, welding, motor vehicle repair and applied technology.
- Classrooms and labs have SmartBoards and accompanying technology to improve lesson presentation.
- Small breakout rooms are located between classrooms for small group work.
- Two classrooms are joined by a folding wall to create a large meeting space.
- A 7,400-square-foot (690 m^{2}) gymnasium and auxiliary gym, along with several playing fields.
- Student safety has been optimized with a new entrance off the Valleyfield Road which will have appropriate turning lanes and ample parking.

== School sports ==
=== Sports at Montague ===
Montague is home to many sports that give students the chance to play and have fun during their three years of high school. At MRHS there is 7,400-square-foot (690 m^{2}) gymnasium and auxiliary gym, one field hockey field, two soccer/rugby fields and two softball fields. The sports fields that surround the school belong not to the school, but rather to the Town of Montague. School sports at Montague Regional High School are coached and organized by both teachers and members of the community.

Sports at Montague Regional High Include:

The athletic logo for Montague High's Football Team.

- Men's and Women's Basketball
- Women's and Men's Ice Hockey
- Men's and Women's Wrestling
- Women's and Men's Rugby
- Men's and Women's Cross Country
- Women's and Men's Soccer
- Men's and Women's Softball
- Women's and Men's Track & Field
- Men's and Women's golf
- Women's and Men's Badminton
- Men's and Women's Volleyball
- Women's and Men's Powerlifting
- Men's Football
- Women's Field Hockey

=== Sports tournaments ===
==== The Vikings Classic ====
A Women's basketball tournament hosted in early December by Montague Regional High School which draws schools competing from across the three Prince Edward Island Counties which are: Kings County, Queens County, and Prince County.

The annual teams are the Montague Vikings, the Souris Spartans, the Morell Marlins, and the Kinkora Blazers.

==== "Hoopfest" ====
A Men's basketball tournament hosted in early February by Montague Regional High School which draws schools competing from across the three Prince Edward Island Counties which are: Kings County, Queens County, and Prince County. A total of six men's basketball teams from schools across the province take part in the annual basketball tournament which is sponsored by Subway.

The annual teams are the Montague Vikings, the Morell Marlins, the Kensington Torchmen, the Kinkora Blazers the Three Oaks Axemen and the Colonel Gray Colonels.

== Clubs at Montague ==
Montague Regional High is home to a variety of clubs, including:

- Breakfast Club
- Chess Club
- Debate Club
- Drama Club
- Yearbook Committee
- Tabletop Games Club
- Grad Activity Committee
- Prom Committee
- Rotary Youth Parliament
- Students Against Destructive Decisions
- SAVE (Students Against Violence Everywhere)
- SWITCH
- Whittling Club
- Writers Club
- Powerlifting Program

== Notable alumni ==
- William Bennett Campbell

== See also ==
- List of schools in Prince Edward Island
- List of school districts in Prince Edward Island
