= Western School Board =

Former school district in Prince Edward Island, Canada

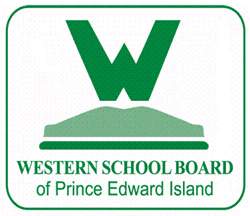
Western School Board Logo

The Western School Board was a Canadian school district in Prince Edward Island, from the 1990s to 2012.

It was an Anglophone district operating 21 public schools (gr. 1–12) in Prince County. It maintained offices in Summerside and Elmsdale.

The Western School Board was created in the 1990s when Regional School Unit 1 and Regional School Unit 2 were merged. Current enrollment was approximately 7,400 students.

- In 2012 the English Language School Board was created when the Eastern School District and Western School Board were merged.

== Kensington Family ==
- Kensington Intermediate Senior High School
- Queen Elizabeth Elementary School

== Kinkora Family ==
- Kinkora Regional High School
- Somerset Elementary School
- Amherst Cove Consolidated School

== Three Oaks Family ==
- Three Oaks Senior High School
- Athena Consolidated School
- Elm Street Elementary School
- Greenfield Elementary School
- Miscouche Consolidated School
- Parkside Elementary School
- Summerside Intermediate School

== Westisle Family ==
- Westisle Composite High School
- Alberton Elementary School
- Bloomfield Elementary School
- Ellerslie Elementary School
- Hernewood Intermediate School
- Merritt E. Callaghan Intermediate School
- O'Leary Elementary School
- St. Louis Elementary School
- Tignish Elementary School

== See also ==
- Eastern School District
- Commission scolaire de langue française
