= 2009 Canada Summer Games =

- Host city: Charlottetown, Prince Edward Island
- Opening: August 15
- Closing: August 29

Summer

The 2009 Canada Summer Games were held in Charlottetown, Prince Edward Island from August 15 to 29.

== Medal standings ==
The following is the medal table for the 2009 Canada Summer Games.

* Host nation ( Prince Edward Island)

Rank	Nation	Gold	Silver	Bronze	Total
1	Ontario	70	68	64	202
2	British Columbia	57	43	44	144
3	Quebec	42	53	50	145
4	Nova Scotia	26	10	16	52
5	Alberta	20	31	25	76
6	Saskatchewan	13	15	20	48
7	Manitoba	5	10	9	24
8	Prince Edward Island*	2	1	1	4
9	Yukon	2	0	2	4
10	New Brunswick	1	4	2	7
11	Newfoundland and Labrador	0	4	2	6
12	Northwest Territories	0	0	0	0
12	Nunavut	0	0	0	0
Totals (13 entries)		238	239	235	712

== Events ==
- Athletics
- Baseball
- Basketball
- Canoe/Kayak
- Cycling
- Diving
- Golf
- Rowing
- Rugby
- Sailing
- Soccer
- Softball
- Swimming
- Tennis
- Triathlon
- Beach volleyball
- Volleyball
- Wrestling

Yukon won its first Canada summer games gold medal at these games courtesy of Alexendra Gabor in the 400M freestyle event in swimming She also won all of Yukon's medals.

== Venues ==
- Alberton Memorial Field, Alberton - Softball
- Brookvale Winter Activity Park, Brookvale - Cycling
- Brudnell River Golf Course, Roseneath - Golf
- CARI Aquatics Facility, Charlottetown - Swimming, Diving
- Centennial Pool, Halifax - Diving
- Chi-Wan Young Sports Centre, Charlottetown - Volleyball
- Clipper Field, Cardigan - Baseball
- Credit Union Place, Summerside - Opening Ceremony
- Eastern Eagles Soccer Complex, Lower Montague - Soccer
- École Évangeline Softball Field, Abrams Village - Softball
- Evangeline Region - Cycling
- Jerry McCormack Memorial Complex, Souris - Soccer
- Kensington Intermediate Senior High School, Kensington - Soccer
- Lions Club Field, Kensington - Softball
- MacLauchlan Arena, Charlottetown - Volleyball
- MacNeil Memorial Field, Stratford - Baseball
- Memorial Field, Charlottetown - Baseball
- Montague and Area Recreation Facility, Montague - Wrestling
- Morell Soccer Complex, Morell - Soccer
- O'Leary Softball Field, O'Leary - Softball
- Silver Fox Curling & Yacht Club, Summerside - Sailing
- Southwest River - Canoe/Kayak, Rowing
- Stratford Soccer Field, Stratford - Soccer
- Summerside Waterfront, Summerside - Triathlon, Cycling
- Summerside Wellness Centre, Summerside - Basketball, Soccer, Beach Volleyball
- Three Oaks Senior High School, Summerside - Rugby, Basketball
- UPEI Alumni Canada Games Place, Charlottetown - Athletics, Soccer, closing ceremonies
- Victoria Park Tennis Courts, Charlottetown - Tennis
- VIV Field, Summerside - Softball
- Westisle Composite High School, Elmsdale - Soccer

== Official site ==
- Jeux du Canada 2009
