= Eastern School District =

School district in Prince Edward Island, Canada

Eastern School District Logo

The Eastern School District was a Canadian school district in Prince Edward Island, from the 1990s to 2012.

The Eastern School District was an Anglophone district operating 43 public schools (gr. 1–12) in Queens and Kings Counties with its headquarters in Stratford. Current enrollment was approximately 14,300 students and 700 teachers.

The Eastern School District was created in the 1990s when Regional School Unit 3 and Regional School Unit 4 were merged.

- In 2012 the English Language School Board was created when the Eastern School District and Western School Board were merged.

== Bluefield Family ==
- Bluefield High School
- Central Queens Elementary School
- East Wiltshire Intermediate School
- Eliot River Elementary School
- Englewood Consolidated School
- Gulf Shore Consolidated School
- Westwood Primary School

== Charlottetown Rural Family ==
- Charlottetown Rural High School
- Donagh Regional School
- Glen Stewart Elementary School
- Lucy Maud Montgomery Elementary School
- Sherwood Elementary School
- Stonepark Intermediate School
- Stratford Elementary School

== Colonel Gray Family ==
- Colonel Gray High School
- Birchwood Intermediate School
- Parkdale Elementary School
- Prince Street Elementary School
- Queen Charlotte Junior High School
- St. Jean Elementary School
- Spring Park Elementary School
- West Kent Elementary School
- West Royalty Elementary School

== Montague Family ==
- Montague Regional High School
- Belfast Consolidated School
- Cardigan Elementary School
- Georgetown Elementary School
- Montague Consolidated School
- Montague Intermediate School
- Southern Kings Consolidated School
- Vernon River Consolidated School

== Morell Family ==
- Morell Regional High School
- Morell Consolidated School
- Mt. Stewart Elementary School

== Souris Family ==
- Souris Regional High School
- Souris Consolidated School

== See also ==
- Western School Board
- Commission scolaire de langue française
