= Three Oaks Senior High School =

Location
- 10 Kenmoore Avenue; Summerside, Prince Edward Island, C1N 4X9; Canada; 46.4007°N 63.7776°W

Information
- School type: Public High school
- Motto: "Veritas Vincit" (Truth Conquers)
- School board: Public Schools Branch
- Superintendent: Cindy Fleet
- Principal: Jacqueline Reeves
- Grades: 10-12
- Enrollment: 757 (2019)
- Language: English
- Colours: Green and Gold
- Mascot: Axeman
- Team name: Three Oaks Axemen
- Website: threeoaks.edu.pe.ca

Three Oaks Senior High School (often abbreviated as TOSH) is a Canadian secondary school located in Summerside, Prince Edward Island for students from the eastern part of Prince County, including the City of Summerside.

The school is administratively part of the Public Schools Branch. Its official colours are Green and Gold and the mascot is an Axeman. The sports teams from TOSH are called the Three Oaks Axemen.

== History and characteristics ==
The school opened in 1976 to replace the Summerside High School on Central Street. This building eventually became Summerside Intermediate School.

== School sports ==
=== Sports at Three Oaks Today ===
TOSH is home to many extracurricular sporting events that are offered throughout students' three years of high school. There is one Field Hockey field, one Softball field, and three Soccer/Rugby fields.

Sports at Three Oaks Senior High Include:

- boys and girls Basketball
- boys and girls Wrestling
- boys and girls Rugby
- boys and girls Cross Country
- boys and girls Soccer
- girls Softball
- boys Baseball
- boys and girls Track & Field
- boys and girls golf
- boys and girls Badminton
- boys and girls Volleyball
- boys and girls Powerlifting
- boys Football
- girls Field Hockey

=== Sports tournaments ===
==== The Christmas Classic ====
A Women's and men's basketball tournament hosted in early December by Three Oaks Senior High School which draws schools competing from across P.E.I., New Brunswick and Nova Scotia. Six women's basketball teams and eight men's basketball teams from schools across the Maritimes take part in the annual basketball tournament.

The annual teams are the Three Oaks Axemen, the Charlottetown Rural Raiders, the Colonel Gray Colonels, the Bluefield Bobcats, the Lockview Dragons, the Millwood Knights, the Sussex Sonics, the Miramichi Golden Eagles, the Dalhousie Vultures and the Amherst Vikings.

==== The Winter Classic ====
A Men's basketball tournament hosted in early January by Three Oaks Senior High School which draws schools competing from across the three Prince Edward Island County which are: Kings County, Queens County, and Prince County. A total of six men's basketball teams from schools across the province take part in the annual basketball tournament.

The annual teams are the Three Oaks Axemen, the Charlottetown Rural Raiders, the Kensington Torchmen, the Westisle Wolverines the Montague Vikings and the Colonel Gray Colonels.

==== David Voye Memorial Rugby Tournament ====
A Women's and men's rugby tournament hosted in early May by Three Oaks Senior High School which draws schools competing from across P.E.I., New Brunswick and Nova Scotia.

The annual teams are the Three Oaks Axemen, the Charlottetown Rural Raiders, the Bluefield Bobcats, the Westisle Wolverines, the North Nova Gryphons, the Cobequid Cougar, the Montague Vikings, the Colonel Gray Colonels, the Avonview Avalanche, the Horton Griffin and the Northumberland Nighthawks.

== Notable alumni ==
- Heather Moyse, 2 time Olympic gold medalist
- Walter Moyse, basketball player
- Adam Casey Curler
- Anson Carmody Curler
- Hannah Taylor Olympic wrestler

== See also ==
- List of schools in Prince Edward Island
- List of school districts in Prince Edward Island
