= Bluefield High School (Prince Edward Island) =

Location
- 924 Colville Road; Hampshire, Prince Edward Island, C0A 1Y0; Canada; 46.282343°N 63.293184°W

Information
- School type: Public High school
- Motto: Tomorrow's Education Today
- Founded: 1978
- School board: Public Schools Branch
- Superintendent: Jane McMillan
- Administrator: Lenette MacDougal; Jeannie Lane
- Principal: Stephen Wenn
- Grades: 10–12
- Enrolment: 700 (2011)
- Language: English
- Area: 98,001 square-feet
- Colours: Blue and White
- Mascot: Bobcat
- Team name: Bluefield Bobcats
- Website: bluefield.edu.pe.ca

Bluefield High School (BHS) is a Canadian secondary school in Hampshire, Prince Edward Island for students from the Mid-part of Queens County, including the town of Cornwall.

The school is administratively part of the Public Schools Branch. Its official colours are blue and white and the mascot is a Bobcat. The sports teams from BHS are called the Bluefield Bobcats.

== History and characteristics ==
- In 2000, a new $2 million addition to Bluefield High School was opened by students, staff, parents, Eastern School District representatives and government officials. The new addition at Bluefield was 15,000 square feet (1,400 m^{2}). It consists of seven classrooms, one special education area, a sick room, an art room, two work rooms, a general office area and a new main entrance area. The Honourable Jeffrey E. Lantz, Minister of Education, also participated in the official opening.
- In 2007, Bluefield was one of three Island schools, and one of ten Canadian schools, to receive a $40,000 HP grant to improve teaching by using technology. The grant was used to enhance teaching math and science at Bluefield. A team of five Bluefield teachers applied for the grant earlier that year.
- In 2010, BHS put on an open house of readings at the Confederation Centre Art Gallery by the Creative Writing Group of Bluefield High School led by Yvette Doucette.

The high school offers both French and English languages.

== Facilities ==
The school's $40,000 HP grant in 2008 allowed the school to install some of the following features:

- A large library and resource centre with an adjoining seminar and meeting rooms.
- The cafetorium with a large stage, prop area, and sound and lighting room.
- Band and music room.
- A kitchen.
- Trades training spaces for carpentry, welding, motor vehicle repair and applied technology.
- SmartBoards and accompanying technology for classrooms.
- One classroom has a wall made of thick see-through glass.
- Two computer labs.
- A 7,000-square-foot (650 m^{2}) gymnasium and an auxiliary gym above it.

== School sports ==
Sports at Bluefield High Include:

The high school's Athletic Logo.

- boys and girls Basketball
- boys and girls Rugby
- boys and girls Cross Country
- boys and girls Soccer
- boys and girls Softball
- boys and girls Track & Field
- boys and girls Golf
- boys and girls Badminton
- boys and girls Volleyball
- boys and girls Powerlifting
- girls Field Hockey

=== Sports tournaments ===
==== The Snowbird Classic ====
A basketball tournament hosted in December by Bluefield High which draws schools competing from across P.E.I., New Brunswick and Nova Scotia.

The annual teams are the Bluefield Bobcats, the Rural Raiders, the Colonel Gray Colonels, the Three Oaks Axemen, the Tantramar Titans and the Sackville Kingfishers.

==== Bluefield Invitational Hockey Tournament ====
In 2012 Bluefield High School and the school's Parent Advisory Council decided to have a fundraising hockey tournament in rinks in Kensington, Montague and Charlottetown. The round-robin tournament featured four female teams and five male teams from the high schools of Evangeline High, Kinkora High, Bluefield High, Colonel Gray Sr. High, Montague High and Souris High.

This was the first time that high school hockey has been played on PEI since 1989 when Bluefield won the provincial title. Funds went to support the Breakfast Program, band, Jo-bo Fitness and sports teams at Bluefield.

== Clubs at Bluefield ==
- Outdoor Adventure Club
- Yearbook Committee
- Chess Club
- Science Club
- Junior Achievement
- Rotary Youth Parliament
- SADD
- PURPLE
- Art Club
- Nap Club
- Anime Club
- Travel Club
- Drama Club
- Improv Club

== Notable alumni ==
- Adam McQuaid, hockey player
- Jared Connaughton, Olympic sprinter

== See also ==
- List of schools in Prince Edward Island
- List of school districts in Prince Edward Island
