= Hospital school =

School operated in a hospital

A hospital school, also known as home and hospital education (HHE), is a school operated in a hospital, generally a children's hospital which provides instruction to all primary and secondary grade levels. These schools help children regain academic progress during periods of hospitalization or rehabilitation. The schools are most often accredited and run by the local public school system, funded by the state, and are based on the same curriculum and testing mandated by the state as is practical for the students. Enrollments are low when compared to traditional schools, and teachers must provide instruction for many grade levels.

Laws and regulations on hospital school and domiciliary learning vary from country to country. The studies related to this field are usually grouped under the term home and hospital education (HHE). The term HHE was first introduced in a proposal for the EU-funded project LeHo (Learning at Home and in the Hospital), an international three-year project funded by the European Union and managed by the Fondazione Politecnico di Milano. The project researched pedagogical practices for ICT use in the hospital school sector.

There are a number of associations worldwide that support the work of hospital schools and hospital teachers. These are HEAL in the US, HOPE in Europe and Redlaceh in South America.

== List of hospital schools ==
Hospital	Location	School operated by	Notes
Carlson Home Hospital School	Los Angeles, California	Los Angeles Unified School District	
Central Regional Health School	Wellington, New Zealand		
Chelsea & Westminster Hospital, Royal Brompton Hospital, St Mary's Hospital, Collingham Child and Family Unit, Lavender Walk Adolescent Mental Health Unit	London, UK	Chelsea Community Hospital School	
Children's Hospital of Illinois	Peoria, Illinois		
Leicester Royal Infirmary	Leicester, UK	Children's Hospital School	
Children's Hospital of The King's Daughters	Norfolk, Virginia	Norfolk Public Schools	
Duke Children's Hospital and Health Center	Durham, North Carolina	Durham Public Schools	
NIH Children's School at NIH Clinical Center Hospital	Bethesda, Maryland	NIH Clinical Center	
Janeway Children's Hospital	St. John's, Newfoundland, Canada	Eastern School District	
Lucile Packard Children's Hospital School	Palo Alto, California	Palo Alto Unified School District	
North Carolina Children's Hospital	Chapel Hill, North Carolina	Chapel Hill-Carrboro City Schools	
Northern Health School	Auckland, New Zealand		
Nottingham University Hospitals Trust	Queens Medical Centre, Nottingham, UK	Hospital and Home Education Learning Centres, Nottingham City School District	
Royal Alexandra Hospital for Children	Westmead, New South Wales, Australia	Department of Education (New South Wales)	
Royal Free Hospital Children's School	London Borough of Camden, UK		
Shriners Hospital for Children	Minneapolis, Minnesota	Minneapolis Public Schools	
Southern Regional Health School	Christchurch, New Zealand		
St George Hospital, Sydney	Kogarah, New South Wales, Australia	Department of Education (New South Wales)	
The Hospital School at Cardon Children's Medical Center	Mesa, Arizona	Banner Health	
University of Wisconsin Hospital	Madison, Wisconsin	Madison Metropolitan School District	
John Hunter Hospital	Newcastle, Australia	John Hunter Hospital School	
Vidant Medical Center / Maynard Children's Hospital	Greenville, North Carolina	Pitt County Public Schools	
Children's Health Ireland at Crumlin	Dublin, Ireland	Solas Hospital School	
El Carmen de Maipú Hospital	Maipú, Santiago, Chile		
Chiloé Hospital	Castro, Chiloe, Chile		
