= Souris Beach Gateway Park =

Provincial park of Prince Edward Island, Canada

Coordinates: 46°21′20.9″N 62°16′6.4″W

Souris Beach Gateway Park is a day-use park located near the town of Souris in eastern Prince Edward Island, Canada. The beach is very shallow, allowing visitors to walk several hundred feet from shore on an all sand bottom. The shallow water also results in the waters at this beach being warmer, as a result of warming by the sun, than other Island beaches where depths increase more quickly.

Unlike many beaches in eastern PEI, this beach has red sand, which is a result of the tidal current and erosion from the nearby red sandstone cliffs. Unfortunately, the beach has suffered from extreme erosion in recent years, as winter storms have obliterated the dune system, allowing tidal waters to further advance on the beach.
