= École Pierre-Chiasson =

Location
- 119, Route 157; Deblois, Prince Edward Island, C0A 2B0; Canada
- Coordinates: 46.918477°N 64.0754195°W

Information
- School type: Public School
- School board: Commission scolaire de langue française
- Principal: Ghislain Bernard
- Grades: K to 12
- Language: French
- Website: pierrechiasson.wordpress.com

École Pierre-Chiasson is a Canadian francophone school in Deblois, Prince Edward Island. Students that attend the school come from the central parts of Prince County.

The school is administratively part of the Commission scolaire de langue française.

== See also ==
- List of schools in Prince Edward Island
- List of school districts in Prince Edward Island
