= List of schools in Prince Edward Island =

This is a list of public schools in the Canadian province of Prince Edward Island that are currently being used. The following is a list of former schools in Prince Edward Island.

== Current school list ==
School name	Municipality	County	Start	End	District	Subdistrict	Founding Year
Alberton Elementary	Alberton	Prince	K	6	PSB	Westisle	
Amherst Cove	Borden-Carleton	Prince	K	8	PSB	Kinkora	
Athena Consolidated	Summerside	Prince	K	9	PSB	Three Oaks	
Belfast Consolidated	Belfast	Queens	K	9	PSB	Montague	
Birchwood Intermediate	Charlottetown	Queens	7	9	PSB	Colonel Gray	
Bloomfield Elementary	Bloomfield	Prince	K	6	PSB	Westisle	
Bluefield High	Hampshire	Queens	10	12	PSB	Bluefield	
Cardigan Consolidated	Cardigan	Kings	K	6	PSB	Montague	
Central Queens	Hunter River	Queens	K	6	PSB	Bluefield	
Charlottetown Rural	Charlottetown	Queens	10	12	PSB	Charlottetown	1965
Colonel Gray	Charlottetown	Queens	10	12	PSB	Colonel Gray	1968
Donagh Regional	Donagh	Queens	K	9	PSB	Charlottetown	
East Wiltshire	Cornwall	Queens	7	9	PSB	Bluefield	
Eliot River	Cornwall	Queens	4	6	PSB	Bluefield	
Ellerslie	Ellerslie-Bideford	Prince	K	6	PSB	Westisle	
Elm Street	Summerside	Prince	K	6	PSB	Three Oaks	
Englewood	Crapaud	Queens	K	9	PSB	Bluefield	
Evangéline	Wellington	Prince	K	12	CSLF	Evangéline	
François-Buote	Charlottetown	Queens	K	12	CSLF	François-Buote	
Georgetown Elementary	Georgetown	Kings	K	8	PSB	Montague	
Glen Stewart	Stratford	Queens	K	3	PSB	Charlottetown	
Greenfield Elementary	Summerside	Prince	K	6	PSB	Three Oaks	
Gulf Shore	North Rustico	Queens	K	9	PSB	Bluefield	
Hernewood Intermediate	Mill River	Prince	7	9	PSB	Westisle	1975
Kensington Intermediate	Kensington	Prince	7	12	PSB	Kensington	1955
Kinkora Regional	Kinkora	Prince	9	12	PSB	Kinkora	1935
L. M. Montgomery	Charlottetown	Queens	K	6	PSB	Charlottetown	
La-Belle-Cloche	Souris	Kings	K	12	CSLF	La-Belle-Cloche	
Merritt E. Callaghan	Tignish	Prince	7	9	PSB	Westisle	1976
Montague Regional	Montague	Kings	10	12	PSB	Montague	2010
Morell Regional	Morell	Kings	9	12	PSB	Morell	
Parkdale Elementary	Charlottetown	Queens	K	6	PSB	Charlottetown	
Parkside Elementary	Summerside	Prince	K	6	PSB	Three Oaks	
Pierre-Chiasson	Deblois	Prince	K	12	CSLF	Evangéline	
Prince Street	Charlottetown	Queens	K	6	PSB	Charlottetown	
Queen Charlotte	Charlottetown	Queens	7	9	PSB	Charlottetown	
Queen Elizabeth Elementary School	Kensington, Prince Edward Island	Prince	K	6	PSB	Kensington	
St-Augustin	Hunter River	Queens	K	6	CSLF	François-Buote	
St. Louis Elementary	St. Louis	Prince	K	6	PSB	Westisle	1972
Sherwood Elementary	Charlottetown	Queens	K	6	PSB	Charlottetown	
Souris Regional	Souris	Kings	K	12	PSB	Souris	1955
Stonepark Intermediate	Charlottetown	Queens	7	9	PSB	Charlottetown	
Stratford Elementary	Charlottetown	Queens	4	6	PSB	Charlottetown	
Sur-Mer	Summerside	Prince	K	12	CSLF	Évangéline	
Three Oaks	Summerside	Prince	10	12	PSB	Three Oaks	1976
Tignish Elementary School	Tignish	Prince	K	6	PSB	Westisle	
Vernon River	Vernon River	Queens	K	9	PSB	Montague	
Westisle Composite	Rosebank	Prince	10	12	PSB	Westisle	1979
Westwood Primary	Cornwall	Queens	K	3	PSB	Bluefield	

== See also ==
- List of school districts in Prince Edward Island
- Higher education in Prince Edward Island
