= Scott Morrison (basketball coach) =

Canadian basketball coach

Utah Jazz
- Title: Assistant coach
- League: NBA

Personal information
- Born: 1978 (age 47–48) Morell, Prince Edward Island, Canada
- Listed height: 6 ft 1 in (1.85 m)

Career information
- High school: Morell Regional (Morell, Prince Edward Island)
- College: UPEI (1995–2000)
- NBA draft: 2000: undrafted
- Position: Guard
- Coaching career: 2001–present

Career history

Coaching
- 2001–2002: Dalhousie (assistant)
- 2002–2003: Dalhousie
- 2003–2013: Lakehead
- 2013–2014: Maine Red Claws (player development)
- 2014–2017: Maine Red Claws
- 2017–2021: Boston Celtics (assistant)
- 2021–2022: Perth Wildcats
- 2022–2023: Salt Lake City Stars
- 2023–present: Utah Jazz (assistant)

Career highlights
- NBA D-League Coach of the Year (2015); OUA Conference Coach of the Year (2010)

Scott Morrison (born 1978) is a Canadian basketball coach who is currently an assistant coach for the Utah Jazz of the National Basketball Association (NBA).

== Early life ==
Morrison was born and raised in Morell, Prince Edward Island, and attended Morell Regional High School. Growing up, his father George was the head coach of the UPEI Panthers men's basketball program.

== College career ==
From 1995 to 2000, Morrison attended the University of Prince Edward Island and played for the Panthers in the Canadian Inter-university Sport (CIS). He graduated as the school's all-time leader in assists and 3-point field goals made and fifth on the all-time leading scorer list. He also finished as the Atlantic University Sport's all-time leader for career three-pointers made (220 in 99 games), still holding the record as of the 2019–20 season.

== Coaching career ==
=== College coaching in Canada (2001–2013) ===
In 2001, after his first year of graduate studies at Dalhousie University, Morrison was appointed an assistant coach of Dalhousie's women's basketball team under head coach Carolyn Savoy. In 2002, as a 24-year-old, he was elevated to head coach of the team.

In 2003, Morrison was appointed head coach of Lakehead University's men's basketball team. During his 10 years at Lakehead, he led the Wolves to four straight CIS Final 8 appearances (2010–2013). He led the team to its first Ontario University Athletics (OUA) Championship in 2011 and to the CIS championship in 2013. Under his leadership, Lakehead went from the worst team in the nation in 2006 to a perennial top five program from 2008 to 2013. Notably, Morrison was named OUA Conference Coach of the Year in 2010.

For the 2013–14 season, Morrison's assistant coach Matt Erdman served as the Wolves' interim coach while Morrison took a one-year sabbatical.

=== Maine Red Claws (2013–2017) ===
Morrison spent the 2013–14 season with the Maine Red Claws of the NBA D-League as a volunteer player development coach.

On September 16, 2014, Morrison was appointed head coach of the Red Claws. In the 2014–15 season, he led Maine to a franchise-best 35–15 record and was selected to helm the Eastern Conference Futures team in the 2015 NBA D-League All-Star Game. He was subsequently named the NBA D-League Coach of the Year and coached the NBA D-League Select Team at the 2015 NBA Summer League.

In January 2016, Morrison became the winningest coach in Red Claws franchise history.

=== Boston Celtics (2017–2021) ===
In June 2017, Morrison was named an assistant coach for the Boston Celtics under head coach Brad Stevens.

After four seasons as an assistant, Morrison interviewed for the Celtics head coaching job in 2021 but the position was given instead to Ime Udoka. Udoka subsequently did not keep Morrison on his staff.

=== Perth Wildcats (2021–2022) ===
On August 24, 2021, Morrison was appointed head coach of the Perth Wildcats of Australia's National Basketball League, on a three-year contract. In the 2021–22 NBL season, the Wildcats had a 14–6 record before losing six of their last eight games to finish fifth and miss the playoffs for the first time since 1986. He parted ways with the Wildcats on June 23, 2022, due to family reasons.

=== Salt Lake City Stars (2022–2023) ===
On October 12, 2022, Morrison was named head coach of the Salt Lake City Stars of the NBA G League.

=== Utah Jazz (2023–present) ===
Morrison joined the Utah Jazz as an assistant coach for the 2023–24 NBA season. He had a second season with the Jazz in 2024–25.

=== National team ===
Morrison was hired as an assistant coach for the Canada men's national under-19 basketball team in 2012. The team won a silver medal at the 2014 FIBA Americas U18 tournament, and placed sixth at the U19 World Championships in 2013 in Prague, both of which were all-time best finishes for Canada in this age group.

== Executive career ==
In April 2025, Morrison joined the basketball operations staff of the Ottawa BlackJacks of the Canadian Elite Basketball League (CEBL), serving as senior advisor and covering basketball management.

== Personal life ==
Morrison and his wife Susanne have two children. Their son has autism and is non-verbal.

== See also ==
- List of foreign NBA coaches
