= École Évangéline =

Location
- 1596 Route 124; Abram-Village, Prince Edward Island, C0B 2E0; Canada; 46.4558492°N 64.066796°W

Information
- School type: Public School
- School board: Commission scolaire de langue française
- Principal: Dominique Morency
- Grades: K to 12
- Language: French
- Colours: Blue and Gold
- Mascot: Coyote
- Team name: Évangéline Coyotes
- Website: evangeline.edu.pe.ca

École Évangéline is a Canadian francophone school in Abram-Village, Prince Edward Island for students who come from the central parts of Prince County.

The school is administratively part of the Commission scolaire de langue française. Its official colours are Blue and Gold and the mascot is a Coyote. The sports teams from "Évangéline" are called the Évangéline Coyotes.

== See also ==
- List of schools in Prince Edward Island
- List of school districts in Prince Edward Island
