= École François-Buote =

Location
- 5, Prom. Acadian; Charlottetown, Prince Edward Island, C1C 1M2; Canada
- Coordinates: 46.261746°N 63.093046°W

Information
- School type: Public School
- School board: Commission scolaire de langue française
- Principal: Isabelle Savoie-Jamieson
- Grades: K to 12
- Language: French
- Colours: Blue, White and Red
- Mascot: Jaguar
- Team name: Jaguars
- Website: francoisbuote.edu.pe.ca

École François-Buote is a Canadian francophone school in Charlottetown, Prince Edward Island. Students that attend the school mainly come from the central parts of Queens County, including the City of Charlottetown.

The school is administratively part of the Commission scolaire de langue française. Its official colours are Blue, White and Red and the mascot is a Jaguar. The sports teams from François-Buote are called the Jaguars.

A three-year $10 million, 54,000 square foot expansion was unveiled in March 2016 by Prince Edward Island Premier Wade MacLauchlan, adding a new high school wing, additional space for an early childhood centre, a music room, science lab and a trades technology section for technical education along with an expansion of the gymnasium and cafeteria.

== See also ==
- List of schools in Prince Edward Island
- List of school districts in Prince Edward Island
