= Charlottetown Rural High School =

Location
- 100 Raiders Road; Charlottetown, Prince Edward Island, C1E 1K6; Canada; 46°15′31″N 63°9′0″W

Information
- School type: Public high school
- Founded: 1966; 60 years ago
- School board: Public Schools Branch
- Principal: Dale McIsaac
- Language: English and French
- Colours: Red and White
- Mascot: A Red Osprey
- Team name: Rural Raiders
- Website: therural.edu.pe.ca

Charlottetown Rural High School (CRHS), known colloquially as "The Rural", is a Canadian secondary school in Charlottetown, Prince Edward Island. Students who attend the school come from the north and east parts of Queens County, including the City of Charlottetown and the town of Stratford.

The school is administratively part of the Public Schools Branch on Prince Edward Island. Its official colors are red and white and the mascot is an osprey, also referred to as a Raider. The sports teams are called the Rural Raiders.

== History and characteristics ==
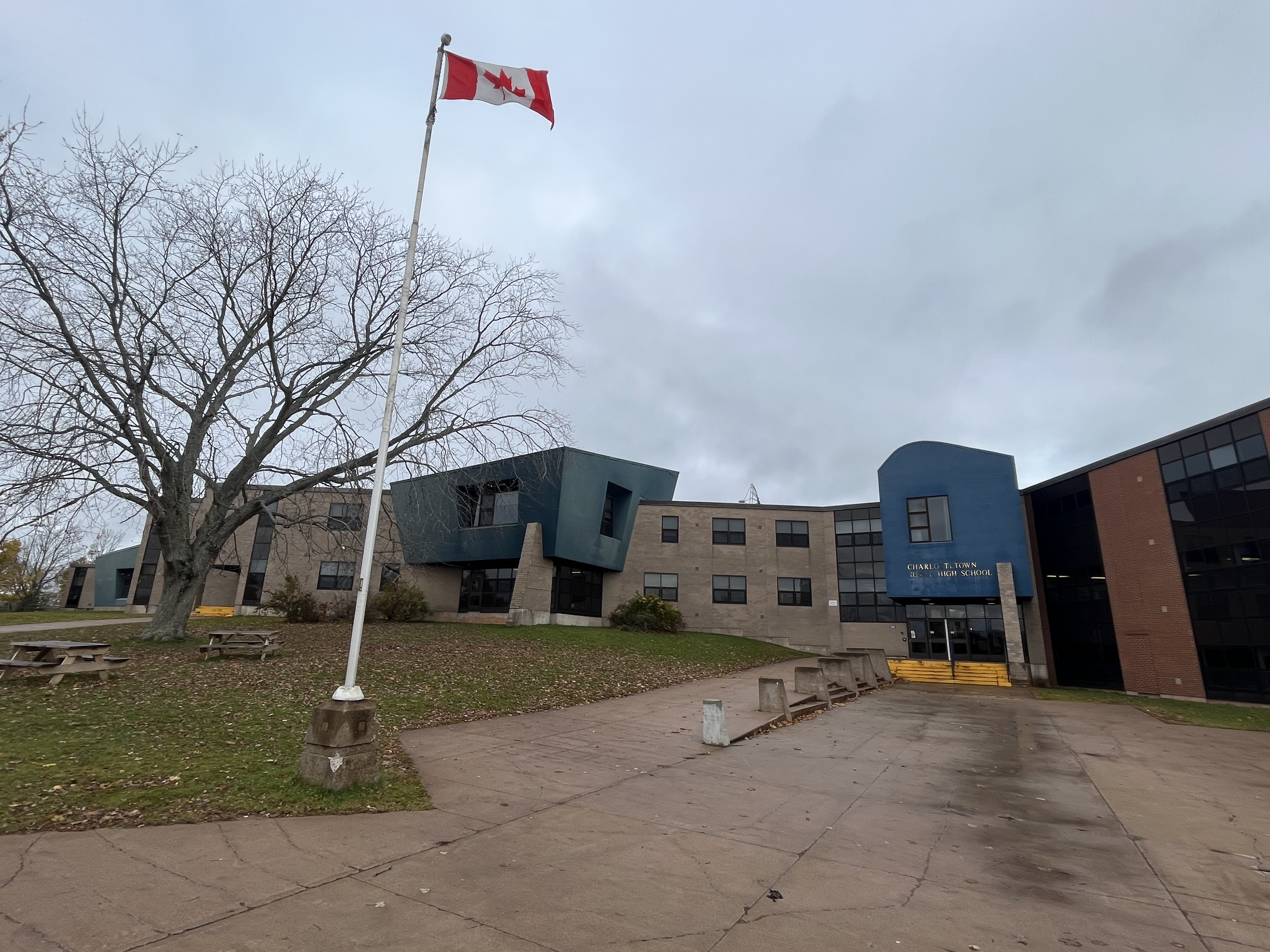
Front gate of Charlottetown Rural High School.

In 1966, Charlottetown Rural High School was built in the growing suburban community of West Royalty, north of the municipal limits of the city of Charlottetown.

In 1994, the school was completely renovated to its present configuration, adding a new cafeteria and specialist instruction space. The renovations saw the building's exterior and interior remodeled using a modern design of unusual angles and curves that symbolize the waves which surround Prince Edward Island.

The school is currently the largest in the province in terms of student enrollment and second largest in terms of area.

The school offers both French and English language and the International Baccalaureate Diploma Programme.

== Extracurricular activities ==
=== School sports ===
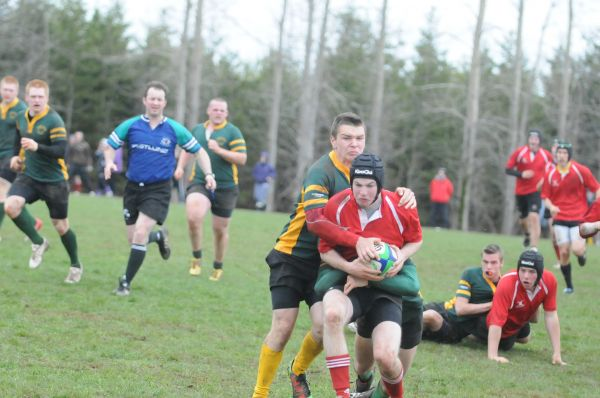
Charlottetown Rural in Summerside playing against TOSH

Sports offered at Charlottetown Rural include:

- boys' and girls' basketball
- boys' and girls' badminton
- boys' and girls' cross country
- boys' and girls' golf
- boys' and girls' rugby
- boys' and girls' soccer
- boys' and girls' track and field
- boys' and girls' volleyball
- girls' field hockey
- girls' softball
- boys ' baseball

The Confederation City Classic is an annual basketball tournament hosted in early January by Charlottetown Rural. It draws 24 teams competing from across the Maritime Provinces and sometimes further afield. 2008 was the 25th year of the tournament.

== Controversies ==
=== October 2021 student walk-outs ===
On October 19, 2021, a walkout of approximately 200 students was organized using social media in regards to the dress code that applies to female students. Students, both male and female, from Charlottetown Rural and Colonel Gray High School attended the protest.

On October 22, a similar protest was organized by the parents of students at the school. The protests were also brought up in the Legislative Assembly of Prince Edward Island by MLAs Lynne Lund and Peter Bevan-Baker.

== Charity projects ==
Every year the students and staff of CRHS take part in various fundraisers for charities.

Adopt a Family takes place each December. Homeroom classes are assigned a family, and given a list of what each member wants for Christmas. The students donate their own money and/or set up activities to raise money, then purchase the items. Each year dozens of families in PEI are able to have Christmas presents and dinners because of this.

Charities sponsored by the student council include:

- 2006-2007 - Free the Children
- 2007-2008 - Children's Wish Foundation of Canada
- 2010-2011 - Free the Children

== Notable alumni ==
- Jordan Brown (Prince Edward Island politician)

- Wayne Easter – Canadian politician
- Wade MacLauchlan—-former Premier of Prince Edward Island

== Notable faculty ==
- Mildred Dover, former English department head, former MLA, PEI Minister of Health and Social Services, and Speaker of the House
- Chester Gillan, former teacher; later served as a provincial cabinet minister in various roles including Minister of Education

== See also ==
- List of schools in Prince Edward Island
- List of school districts in Prince Edward Island
