= Kinkora Regional High School =

Location
- 54 Anderson Road; Kinkora, Prince Edward Island, C0B 1N0; Canada; 46°19′20″N 63°35′54″W

Information
- School type: Public High school
- Founded: 1935
- School board: Public Schools Branch
- Principal: Ryan McAleer
- Grades: 9, 10, 11, 12
- Enrollment: ~130
- Language: English
- Colours: Blue and gold
- Team name: Blazers
- Website: www.edu.pe.ca/kinkora/

Kinkora Regional High School, is a Canadian secondary school in Kinkora, Prince Edward Island. It was the first rural high school in PEI. The school draws students from the communities of Borden-Carleton, Bedeque, Emerald, Middleton, and Kinkora.

== See also ==
- List of schools in Prince Edward Island
- List of school districts in Prince Edward Island
