= St. Mary's Roman Catholic Church (Souris, Prince Edward Island) =

Catholic Church building in Souris, Prince Edward Island, Canada

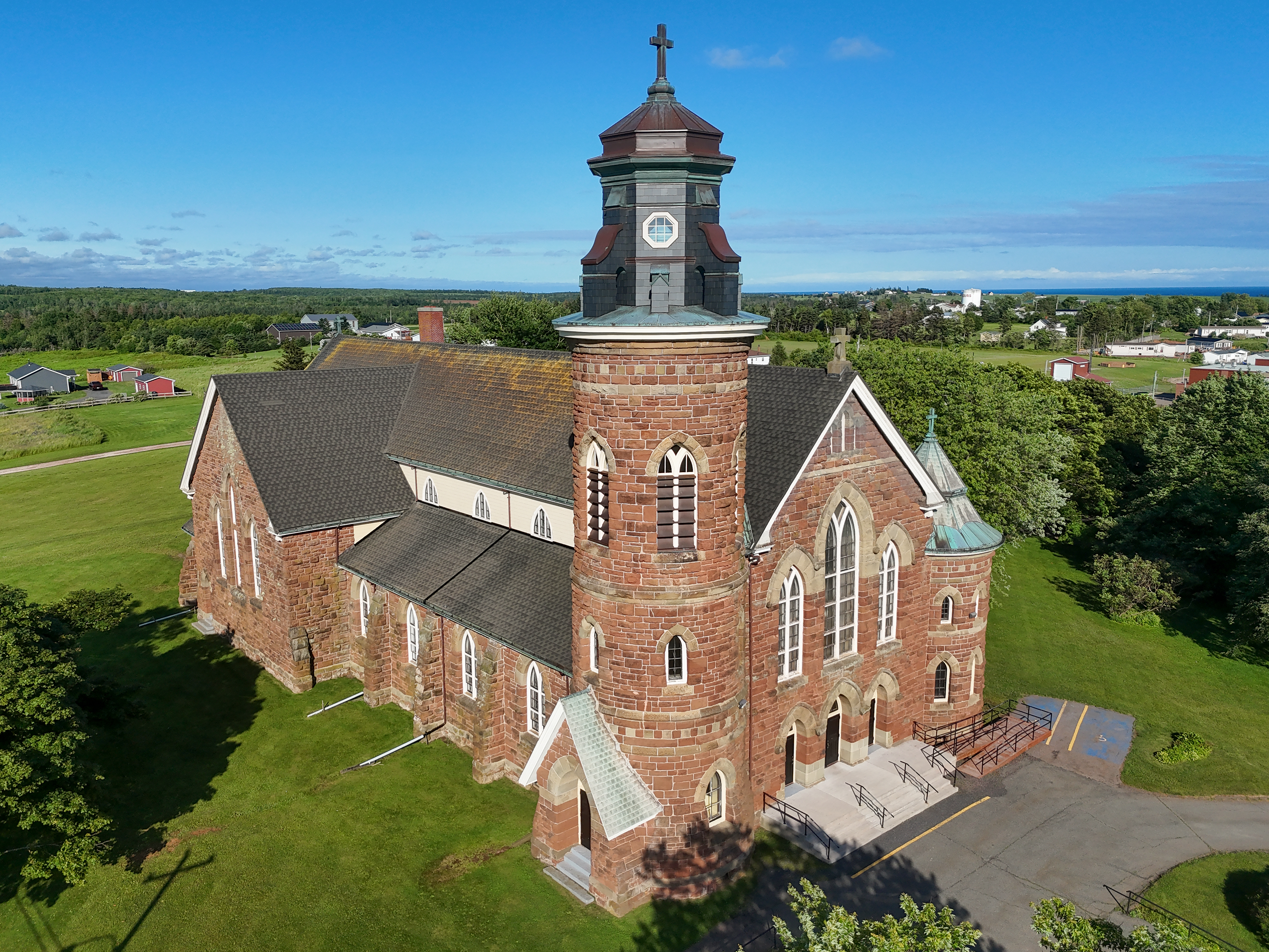
- St. Mary's Roman Catholic Church
- 46.3594°N 62.2527°W
- Location: Souris, Prince Edward Island
- Country: Canada
- Denomination: Catholic Church

History
- Status: Parish church
- Founded: 1839
- Dedication: St. Mary

Architecture
- Functional status: Active
- Architect: William Critchlow Harris
- Style: Gothic Revival
- Groundbreaking: 1901
- Completed: 1902; rebuilt 1930 (after fire)

Specifications
- Materials: Island sandstone; wood interior

National Historic Site of Canada
- Official name: St. Mary's Roman Catholic Church
- Type: Canadian Register of Historic Places
- Designated: 2012
- Reference no.: 19171

Administration
- Diocese: Diocese of Charlottetown

St. Mary’s Church is a Roman Catholic church in Souris, Prince Edward Island, Canada. It is part of the Roman Catholic Diocese of Charlottetown.

== History ==
Catholic ministry in the Souris area is recorded in the 19th century; the parish is commonly dated to 1839 within the Diocese of Charlottetown. An earlier church and rectory were destroyed by fire in 1849.

As the parish grew around 1900, a large cruciform church of Island sandstone was built on Longworth Street and completed in the early 20th century. The Canadian Register of Historic Places describes it as a Gothic Revival church noted for its size, materials, and prominence in the town.

In March 1929, a fire destroyed the interior and left only the sandstone walls standing. The parish rebuilt quickly, and the church was reopened and blessed on 7 September 1930. Records of the period note that Charlottetown architect John Marshall Hunter oversaw the restoration work during 1929–30.

== Architecture ==
St. Mary’s is a Gothic Revival church with a cruciform plan, a front tower-porch, pointed-arch windows, and steep gables. The exterior is built of Island sandstone, and the interior is finished in wood.
