= École La-Belle-Cloche =

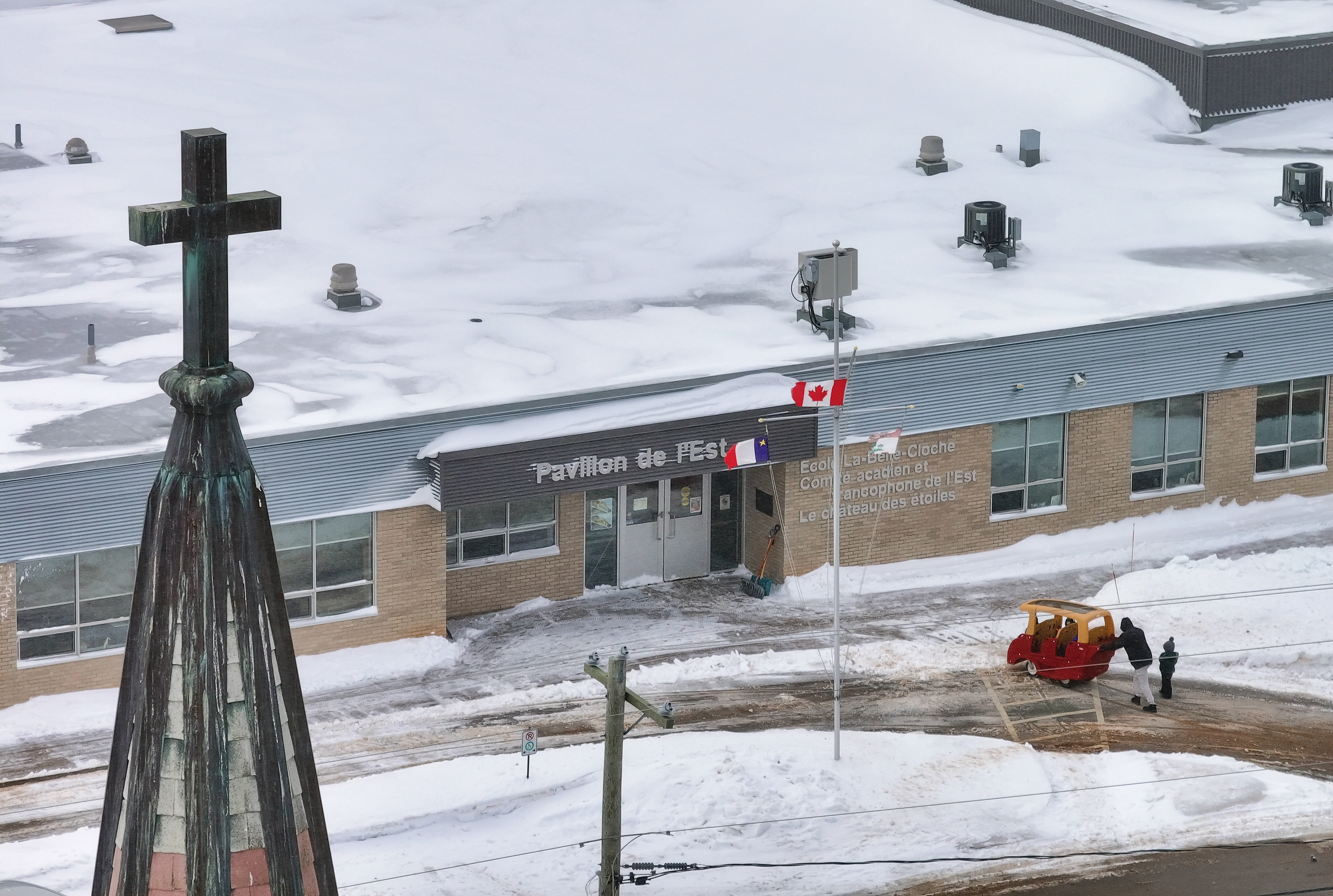

Location
- 861, Route 2 Rollo Bay, Prince Edward Island, C0A 2B0; Canada
- Coordinates: 46.3539021°N 62.3741104°W

Information
- School type: Public School
- School board: Commission scolaire de langue française
- Principal: Marise Chapman
- Grades: K to 12
- Language: French
- Website: labellecloche.edu.pe.ca

École La-Belle-Cloche is a Canadian francophone school in Fortune Bridge, Prince Edward Island. Students that attend the school come from the central parts of Kings County.

The school is administratively part of the Commission scolaire de langue française.

== See also ==
- List of schools in Prince Edward Island
- List of school districts in Prince Edward Island
