= Port of Souris =

Community-owned port and ferry terminal in Prince Edward Island, Canada

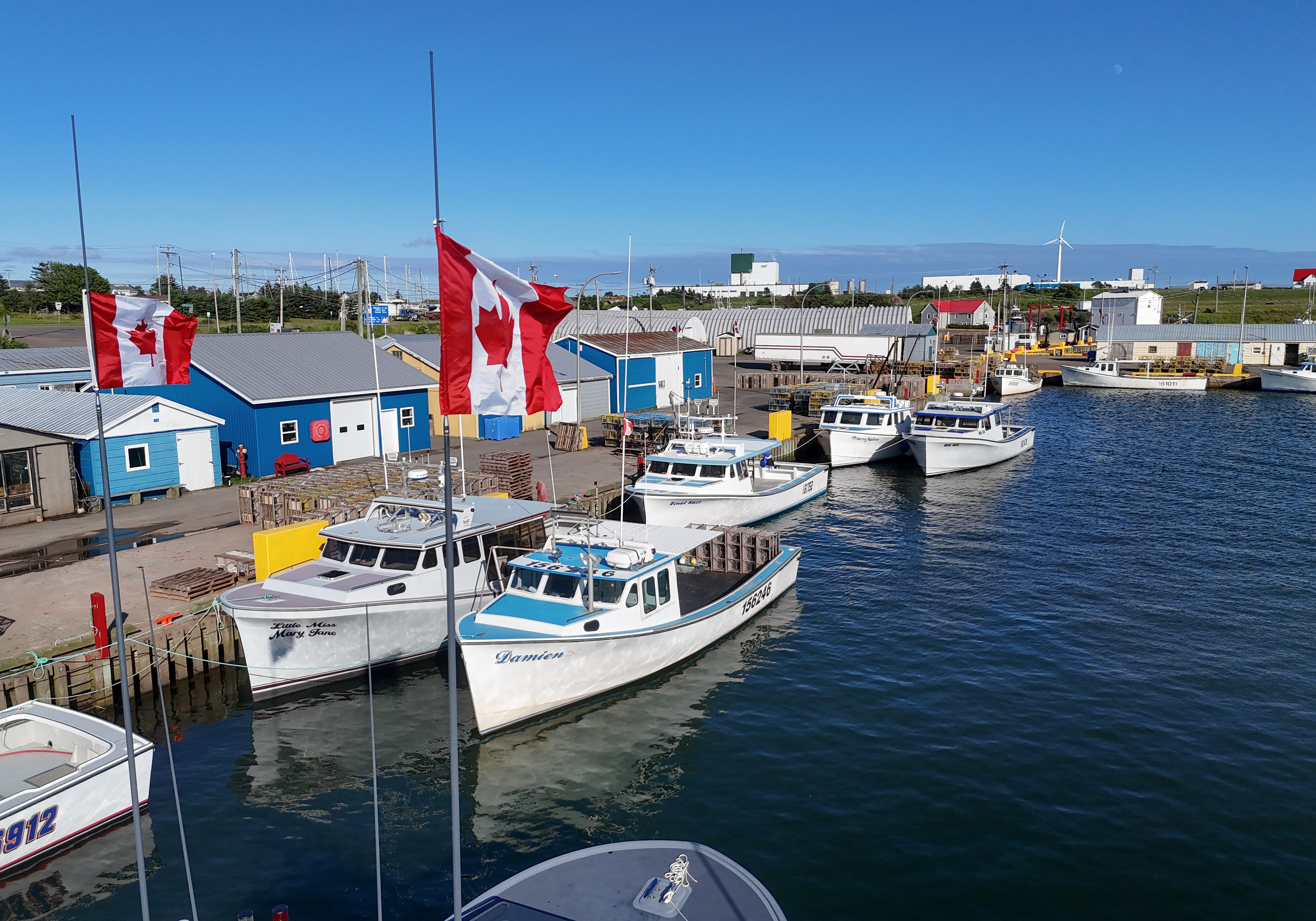
- Fishing vessels docked in 2025
- Interactive map of Port of Souris
- Location in Canada Prince Edward Island

Location
- Country: Canada
- Location: Souris, Prince Edward Island
- Coordinates: 46°21′00″N 62°14′00″W
- UN/LOCODE: CASOU

Details
- Owned by: Souris Harbour Authority Inc.
- Type of harbour: Coastal, breakwater harbour
- No. of wharfs: 5

Statistics
- Website www.shai.ca

The Port of Souris is a community-owned harbour in the town of Souris in eastern Prince Edward Island, Canada. It serves commercial fisheries, a year-round ferry to Îles de la Madeleine (Québec) operated by Coopérative de Transport Maritime et Aérien a marina for recreational boating, and a seasonal Canadian Coast Guard search-and-rescue station.

== Location and jurisdiction ==
The public port of Souris was historically defined in federal regulations as the navigable waters of Colville Bay north of a line between Souris Head and Swanton Point. In 2006, ownership and operation of the facilities were transferred from Transport Canada to the community-run Souris Harbour Authority Inc.

== See also ==
- Souris, Prince Edward Island
- Îles de la Madeleine
- Canadian Coast Guard
