= Souris Regional School =

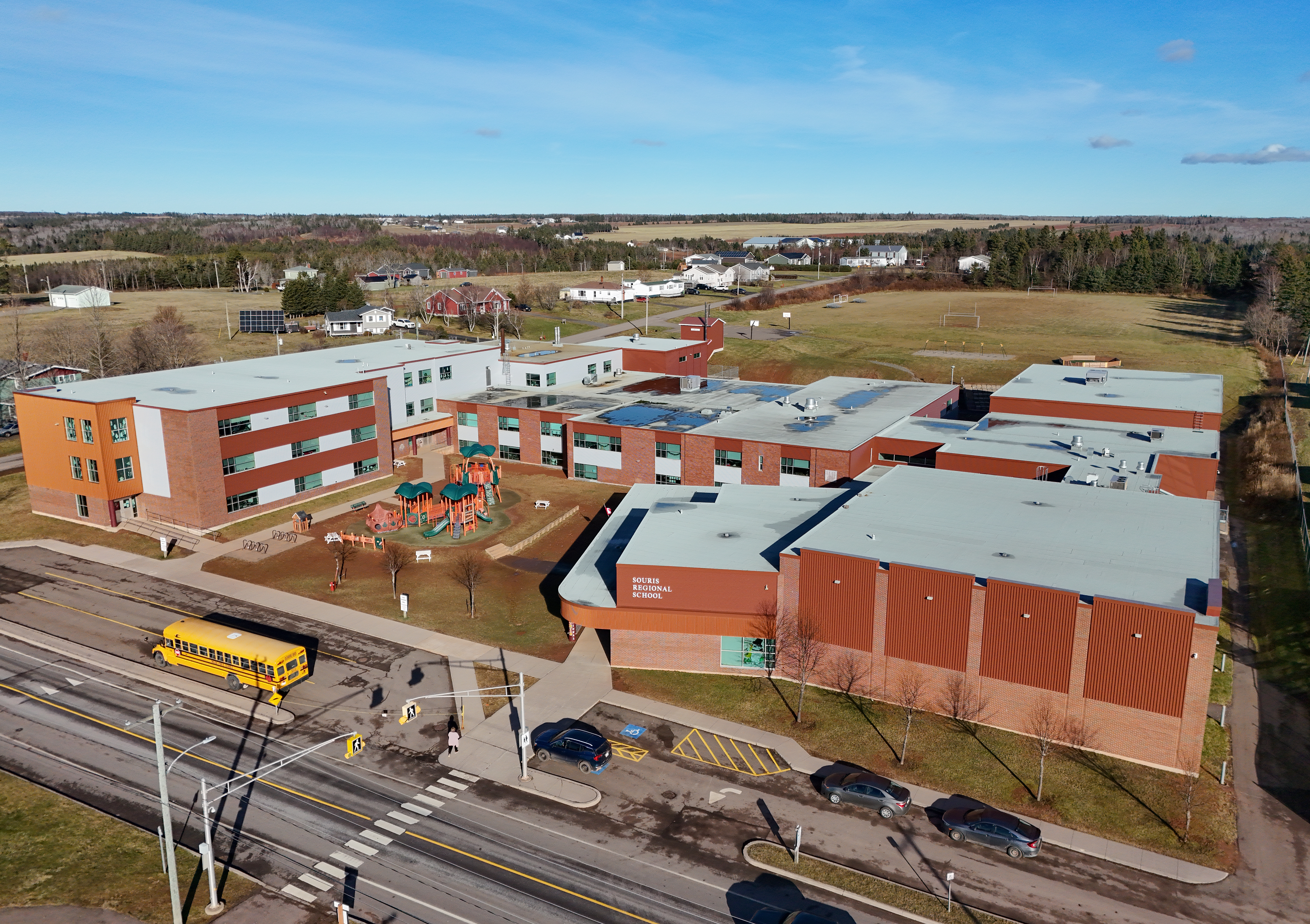

Location
- 15 Longworth St. Souris, Prince Edward Island, C0A 2B0; Canada; 46.357779°N 62.251069°W

Information
- School type: Public School
- Motto: Quod Erimus Nunc Fimus (What we are to be, we are now becoming.)
- Founded: 1955
- School board: Public Schools Branch
- Superintendent: Ricky Hood
- Principal: Lynn MacPhee
- Grades: K-12
- Enrollment: 625 ** (2014 **)
- Language: English
- Colours: Maroon and Gold
- Mascot: Martin the Spartan
- Team name: Souris Spartans
- Website: www.edu.pe.ca/sourishigh/

Souris Regional School, is a Canadian public school located in Souris, Prince Edward Island. The school instructs students from Kindergarten to Grade 12. The school serves the north eastern part of Kings County.

Souris Regional School has adopted maroon and gold as its official colours. Its mascot is a Spartan and sports teams are called the Souris Spartans.

== History and characteristics ==
- In 1961, the Souris Regional High School instructing students in grades 9-12 was officially opened by Premier Walter R. Shaw.
- In 1984, a section of Souris Regional High School was demolished and a new section added containing classrooms, cafeteria, gymnasium, and an area for vocational training in carpentry, welding and motor vehicle repair.
- Beginning with the 2009 academic year, Souris Regional High School changed to grades 8-12; this was due to the closure of several smaller consolidated (K-8) schools in Kings County.
- In 2011 the provincial government approved a request from the school board to close and demolish the Souris Consolidated School (grades K-7) and to renovate and build an addition onto the Souris Regional High School building in order to accommodate a total of 625 students (grades K-12). Planning and design was completed in 2012 and construction took place in 2013–2014.
- The school was renamed Souris Regional School and students from grades K-12 began attending class in 2014.

Souris Regional School is currently the second smallest in the province in terms of student enrollment.

== Notable alumni ==
- Ross Young '84: member of the legislative assembly of Prince Edward Island

== See also ==
- List of schools in Prince Edward Island
- List of school districts in Prince Edward Island
