= Interfolio =

Interfolio Inc.
- Type: Private
- Industry: Software
- Founded: 1999; 27 years ago
- Founder: Steve Goldenberg
- Headquarters: Washington, D.C., United States
- Area served: Worldwide
- Key people: Andrew H. Rosen (CEO)
- Products: Academic faculty management software
- Parent: Elsevier
- Website: interfolio.com

Interfolio is an academic faculty management software and higher education technology company based in Washington, D.C. The company provides software to assist shared governance processes and faculty activity tracking tools to assist with institutional accreditation and reporting. In January 2016, the company acquired $12 million in investor funding. On June 2, 2022, Elsevier, an entity in the realm of research publishing and information analytics, and a subsidiary of RELX, announced the successful acquisition of Interfolio.

== Foundation and services ==
Interfolio was founded by Georgetown University senior Steve Goldenberg in 1999. Interfolio's services represents a complete faculty lifecycle and information system. Interfolio was created to streamline the college application process for academic jobs by providing an online portfolio and application system. Principal Interfolio services includes Dossier, a service for collecting, curating, and delivering academic materials to scholarly opportunities. Interfolio based a module for faculty information that includes a workflow and evaluation suite, as well as a tool for faculty activity reporting.

== Controversy ==
Following some abusive tweets in 2018, UKRI and Interfolio subsidiary Researchfish staff created a policy for sharing abusive, threatening or offensive tweets so that UKRI could suggest the senders reconsider their language.

In March 2022, Researchfish was accused of attempting to threaten or intimidate academics who criticised the company or its products online. Some academics have raised concerns that the company may have violated UK General Data Protection Regulations by accessing the protected data it collects to identify and target its online critics.

As a result, UKRI published an internal report acknowledging the criticism and enacted policy changes with Researchfish that any tweets of concern should be dealt with through the mechanisms provided by the platform, such as the Twitter reporting function.

== Notable partners ==
- Inside Higher Ed
- American Sociological Association
- Princeton University
- American Historical Association
- University of California, Los Angeles
