= Commission scolaire de langue française =

School district in Prince Edward Island, Canada

Commission scolaire de langue française The Success Is Everyone's Business

Location
- Abram-Village Canada

District information
- Chair of the board: Robert Maddix
- Schools: 6

Students and staff
- Students: 673

Other information
- Website: www.edu.pe.ca/cslf

The Commission scolaire de langue française is a school district in Abram-Village, Prince Edward Island, Canada.

The Commission scolaire de langue française is a Francophone district operating 6 public schools (gr. 1–12) across the province. Current enrollment is approximately 673 students. The Commission scolaire de langue française is headquartered in Abrams Village.

The Commission scolaire de langue française was created in the 1990s when Regional School Unit 5 was renamed and its mandate extended province-wide.

== Évangéline Family ==
- École Évangéline
- École-sur-Mer
- École Pierre-Chiasson

== François-Buote Family ==
- École François-Buote
- École St-Augustin

== La-Belle-Cloche Family ==
- École La-Belle-Cloche

== See also ==
- List of schools in Prince Edward Island
- List of school districts in Prince Edward Island
- Holland College
- University of Prince Edward Island
