= Westisle Composite High School =

Location
- PO Box 38, 39570 Western Road - Route 2 Rosebank, Prince Edward Island, C0B 1K0; Canada; 46°48′24.25″N 64°8′47.24″W

Information
- School type: Public High School
- Founded: 1979
- School board: Public Schools Branch
- Principal: Brian Gard
- Grades: 10, 11, 12
- Enrollment: ~600
- Language: English
- Colours: Blue and Gold
- Mascot: Wolverine
- Team name: Westisle Wolverines
- Website: westislewolverines.wordpress.com

Westisle Composite High School is a Canadian secondary school in, Rosebank, Prince County, Prince Edward Island.

Established in 1979, Westisle provides education for 10th to 12th grade students in the western part of the county. The school is administratively part of the Public Schools Branch, and as of 2009 has an estimated student population of approximately 600. Westisle receives its students from two separate intermediate schools, Merritt E. Callaghan Intermediate School and Hernewood Intermediate School.

== History ==
=== Planning ===
In the late 1960s, the Government of Prince Edward Island embarked upon a joint project with the federal government known as the PEI Economic and Social Development Plan. One phase of the plan focused on education and called for a reorganization of the system. The first step was the establishment of five planning boards of 15 members each. After several meetings, the planning board reached the decision to reorganize the school system of western Prince County into six elementary schools, two junior high schools, and a senior high school.

In 1976, construction of Westisle Composite High School began, at the expense of discontinuing more localized secondary education that was taking place at Tignish High, Alberton High and O'Leary High schools. The decision was made to merge all of these former schools into one by then Minister of Education, Bennett Campbell. Though some were against the initial change, many now feel it was an appropriate move.

== Notable alumni ==
- Morgan Ellis, Hockey Player

== Notable staff ==
- Dave Cameron - former Ottawa Senators head coach was a guidance counselor at Westisle

== See also ==
- List of schools in Prince Edward Island
- List of school districts in Prince Edward Island
