= Kensington Intermediate Senior High School =

Location
- 19 Victoria Street East; Kensington, Prince Edward Island, C0B 1M0; Canada; 46.440738°N 63.628838°W

Information
- School type: Public High school
- Motto: "Stamus Pro Veritate" (We stand for the truth)
- School board: Public Schools Branch
- Principal: Donald Mulligan
- Grades: 7, 8, 9, 10, 11, 12
- Enrollment: ~400
- Language: English
- Colours: green & white
- Mascot: george woods
- Team name: Torchmen, Torchettes
- Website: kensington.edu.pe.ca

Kensington Intermediate Senior High School, is a public secondary school in Kensington, Prince Edward Island, Canada.

Opened in 1955, it was a very small school until it received a $6.7 million grant and 40,000 square feet (3,700 m^{2}) were added. Today it hosts grades 7 through 12, dividing the junior students into grades 7-9 and the senior students into grades 10–12, and has both an English program and late French Immersion program. The KISH school mascot is a torch, and the school motto is "Stamus Pro Veritate". KISH contains an industrial arts room, home economics room, library, gymnasium, 3 computer labs, cafeteria, and a stage. On school property there are also three tennis courts, a softball diamond, 2 soccer / rugby fields and a sports track. There are many extracurricular activities offered to students, such as Student Council, Band, Drama, Peer Tutoring, Student Police, and a wide range of sports such as volleyball, rugby, soccer, basketball, badminton, cross country and track and field. A very successful Canadian Travel and Tourism Diploma and Agriculture Certificate program are offered to senior high students as an extra-curricular program with curriculum links to a number of courses. KISH also has an annual show called the Green and White Revue, which features talent from the student body.

In 2013, the school became a focus of media attention after the principal at the time pleaded guilty to luring an underage student at the school. He was sentenced to three months in jail.

== See also ==
- List of schools in Prince Edward Island
- List of school districts in Prince Edward Island
