= Morell Regional High School =

Location
- 100 Little Flower Avenue; Morell, Prince Edward Island, C0A 1S0; Canada
- 46.416282°N 62.707304°W

Information
- School type: Public High school
- Motto: "Non Scholae Sed Vitae" ("Not for School but for Life")
- School board: Public Schools Branch
- Principal: John B. Crawford
- Grades: 9–12
- Language: English
- Colours: Green and Gold
- Team name: Marlins
- Website: morellhigh.edu.pe.ca

Morell Regional High School, is a Canadian secondary school in Morell, Prince Edward Island. The school is a part of the Prince Edward Island Department of Education and Lifelong Learning. Morell was one of the communities to host the torch relay for the 2023 Canada Winter Games.

== See also ==
- List of schools in Prince Edward Island
- List of school districts in Prince Edward Island
