= Colonel Gray High School =

Colonel Gray Senior High School

Location
- 175 Spring Park Road; Charlottetown, Prince Edward Island, C1A 3Y8; Canada; 46.2410°N 63.1404°W

Information
- School type: Public High school
- Motto: "Quaecumque Vera" (Whatsover things are true)
- Founded: 1968
- School board: Public Schools Branch
- Superintendent: Parker Grimmer
- Administrator: Mary Whalley; Kelly Minnis; Deneen Gallant-Norring
- Principal: Andrew Petrie
- Grades: 10-12
- Enrollment: 913 (2019)
- Language: English
- Colours: Burgundy and Grey
- Mascot: Colonel
- Team name: Colonel Gray Colonels
- Website: colonelgray.edu.pe.ca

Colonel Gray Sr. High School (CGHS), colloquially referred to as "The Gray", is a Canadian secondary school in Charlottetown, Prince Edward Island. Its zone includes students from the central parts of Queens County, in the City of Charlottetown.

The school is administratively part of the Public Schools Branch. Its official colours are Burgundy and Gray and the mascot is a Colonel. The sports teams from "The Gray" are called the Colonel Gray Colonels.

== History and characteristics ==
- In 1966 Colonel Gray opened, named after Colonel John Hamilton Gray, former Premier of Prince Edward Island (1863–1865) and chairman of the Confederation conference of 1864.
- In 2008, Colonel Gray received a $40,000 HP grant to improve teaching by using technology. The grant was used to enhance teaching math and science at The Gray.
- In 2009, Colonel Gray High School became an IB World School offering the IB Diploma Programme to students.

IB Subjects Offered:

- Biology Higher Level
- English A1 Higher Level
- History Higher Level
- Chemistry Standard Level
- French B Standard Level
- French Ab Initio Standard Level
- Math Standard Level
- Visual Arts Standard Level

The school has 80 staff members who offer instruction in grades 10, 11 and 12 for approximately 1000 students. The high school offers both French and English-language instruction and the International Baccalaureate Diploma Programme.

== Facilities ==
- Over one hundred classrooms most of which contain Smart Boards
- A chemistry lab
- A biology lab
- An automotive shop
- A carpentry shop
- A Student Council office for Student Event planning
- A kitchen used to supply many in-school events or public speakers or organizations visiting the high school
- A lecture theatre
- Four computer labs
- A library
- A gymnasium with a fitness centre
- Cafeteria
- Specialist instruction space

== School sports ==
=== Sports at Colonel Gray today ===
Colonel Gray is home to many sports. Colonel Gray has fields for the following sports: field hockey, soccer/rugby and softball. The fields are shared with Simmons Sports Arena and Queen Charlotte Intermediate School which are both within walking distance. The school is also within walking distance of the Victoria Park tennis courts, outdoor pool, and baseball fields.

Sports offered at Colonel Gray include:

The school's athletic logo.

- Men's and Women's basketball
- Men's and Women's rugby
- Men's and Women's soccer
- Men's and Women's track and field
- Men's and Women's volleyball
- Men's and Women's softball
- Women's field hockey
- Men's and Women's badminton
- Men's and Women's cross country
- Men's and Women's golf
- Men's and Women's wrestling
- Men's baseball

=== Sports tournaments ===
==== The Wall of Fame Cup ====
A men's and women's volleyball and soccer tournament hosted in October. Each year several notable Colonel Gray alumni athletes are inducted into the Colonel Gray Wall of Fame at a Dinner hosted at the Holland College Culinary Center.

==== The Colonel Gray Classic ====
A Women's basketball tournament hosted in early December by Colonel Gray High which draws schools competing from across the Maritime provinces.

==== The Gray Cup ====
A Men's basketball tournament hosted in early December by Colonel Gray High which draws schools competing from across the Maritime provinces.

=== Intramurals ===
- Major League Dodgeball Association (run by the Student Council)
- Colonel Gray Ball Hockey Association (run by the Student Council)
- Speed Ball Tournament (run by Colonel Gray Leadership Club)

== Notable alumni ==
- Robert Ghiz, former Premier of Prince Edward Island
- Martha MacIsaac, Canadian actress
- Clifford Lee, former mayor of Charlottetown, Prince Edward Island
- Heather Morrison, Chief public health officer of Prince Edward Island
- Andrew Simmons, Account Executive at Interfolio

== See also ==
- List of schools in Prince Edward Island
- List of school districts in Prince Edward Island
