= Elmsdale, Prince Edward Island =

Elmsdale
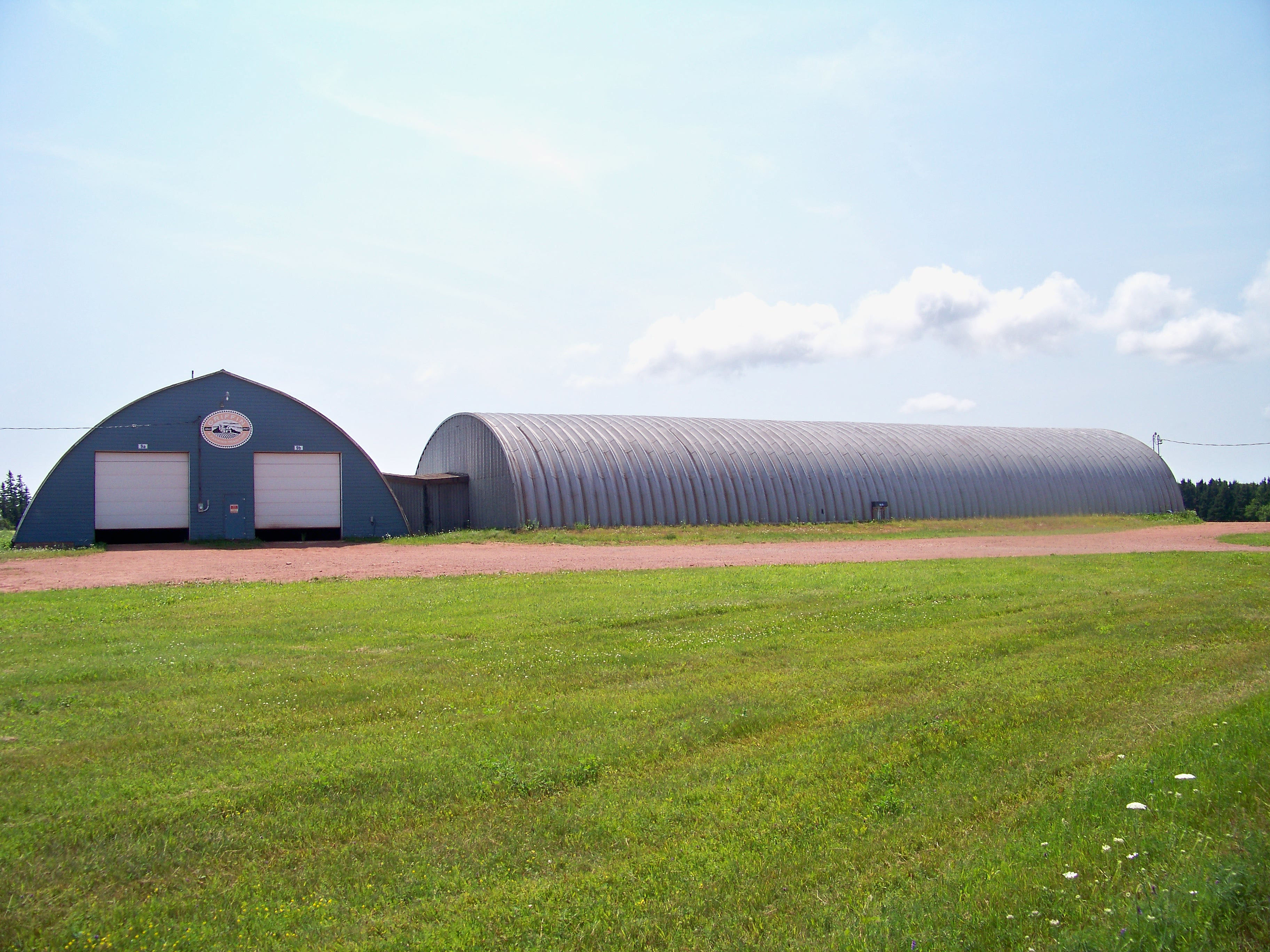
- A Quonset hut in the community

- Location of Elmsdale in Prince Edward Island
- Coordinates: 46°49′14″N 64°08′12″W
- Country: Canada
- Province: Prince Edward Island
- County: Prince County

Elmsdale is a Canadian rural community located in western Prince County, Prince Edward Island.

== History ==
=== The Name ===
When the Great Western Road and Dock Road were created, Elmsdale was born. Beginning in 1841, the farms along Dock Road were surveyed. When it crossed the Great Western Road creating a crossroads, James Reid owned the land where the Nazarene Church parking lot is today. The community that quickly formed at this crossroads was called Reid's Corner.

In 1865, John Adams and his family moved and settled on the same corner. Reid died in 1866. Until 1872, the community was called Adams' Corner, but sometimes people still referred to it as Reid's Corner.

When the railway was surveyed through Lot 4, the community was referred to as Reid's or Adams' Corner. Since the station was near the Dock Road intersection, it was called the Dock Road Station between 1872 and 1875. The residents were not satisfied with that name and met to change it. The name Elmsdale was first used in 1868, but did not become the only one until 1875.

=== Industrialization ===
For many years, Elmsdale was a small settlement wedged between Campbellton and Alberton.

As "The Corner" grew into an industrial center, people built homes close to their place of work, and churches for worship. They were the Presbyterian and the Salvation Army (later the Church of the Nazarene).

=== Elmsdale West and Brockton ===
Up the Dock Road two other communities were formed, Elmsdale West and Brockton. Elmsdale West has always been, and continues to be, an agricultural settlement. Brockton was formed at the intersection of the Trainor Road and the Dock Road, and was first called Dock Road Settlement. St. Bernadette's Roman Catholic Church was built in 1929 in Brockton.

As Elmsdale expanded, more roads were built, creating a spider's web of routes. Roads include the Butcher Road, the Wells Road, the Warren Road, the Murray Road, the Old Tom Road, the O'Brien Road, and others.

== Agriculture ==
=== PEI Grain Elevators Corporation ===
Elmsdale is home to the PEI grain elevator #3, it was built in 1978 and is made out of steel and concrete. It has 24 different bins that range from 12 to 12000 tonnes. The total facility is capable of storing 9200 metric tonnes. This grain elevator is capable of handling barley, oats, soybean, wheat and corn.

=== W.P. Griffin Inc. ===
W.P. Griffin Inc. is a potato farming business located in Elmsdale. The business was founded in 1928. W.P. Griffin Inc. packages many different types of potatoes including Russets, Yellow-fleshed, Reds and Round Whites. This company offers many different specialty products such as BBQ ready, microwave ready and restaurant style potatoes. W.P. Griffin Inc. is also the initial branding partner for Dole Potatoes in Canada.

== Politics ==
Elmsdale falls within the provincial district 26 (Alberton-Bloomfield) and is currently represented by Ernie Hudson. There is a polling station at the Elmsdale Community School.

Elmsdale falls within the federal riding of Egmont currently represented by Bobby Morrissey.

== Churches ==
Elmsdale has two churches:

- Elmsdale Church of the Nazarene. Led by pastor Eddie Rossiter.
- Elmsdale United Church

== See also ==
- List of communities in Prince Edward Island
