= Souris, Prince Edward Island =

Souris
- Town
- Town of Souris
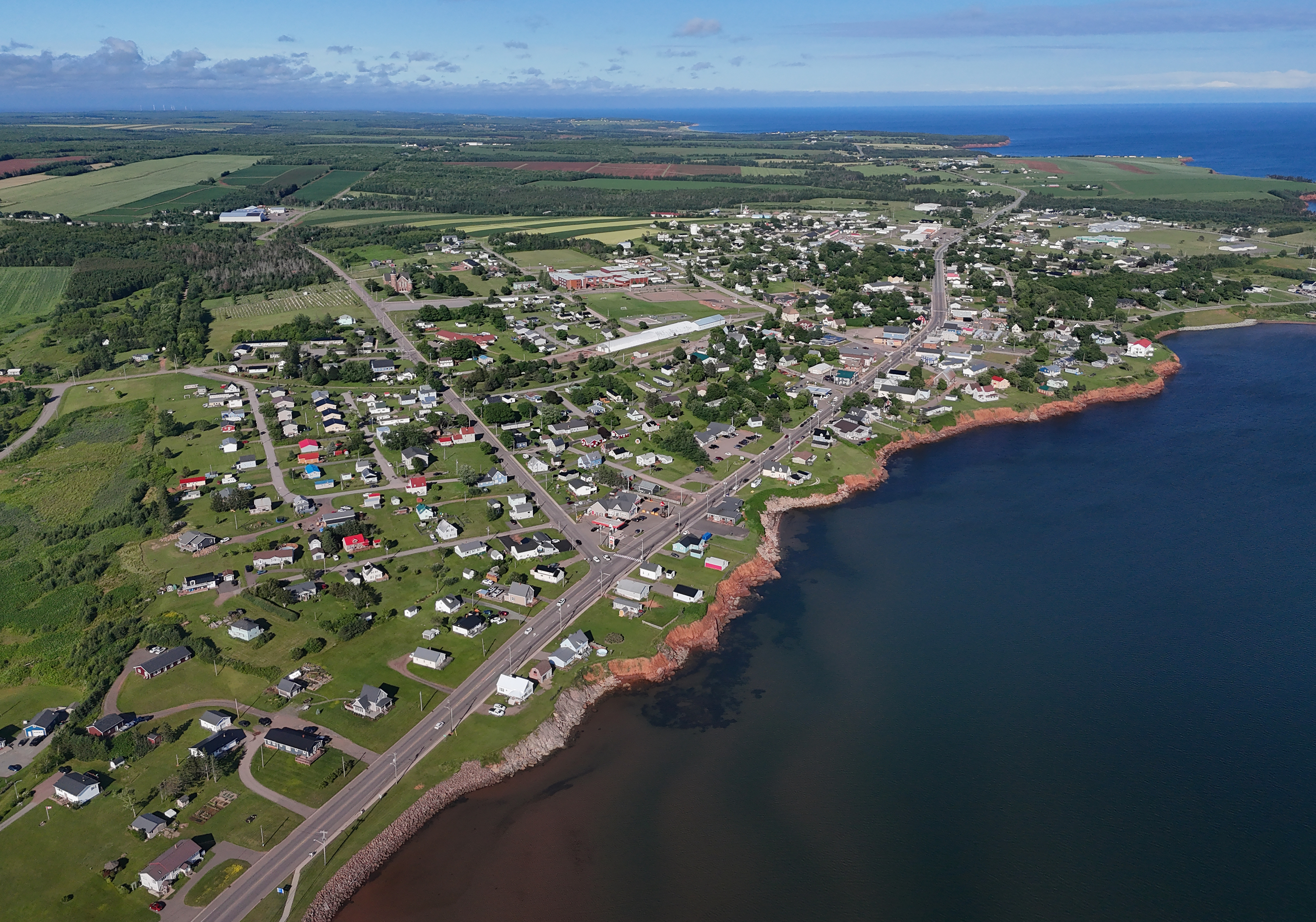
- Aerial view in 2025

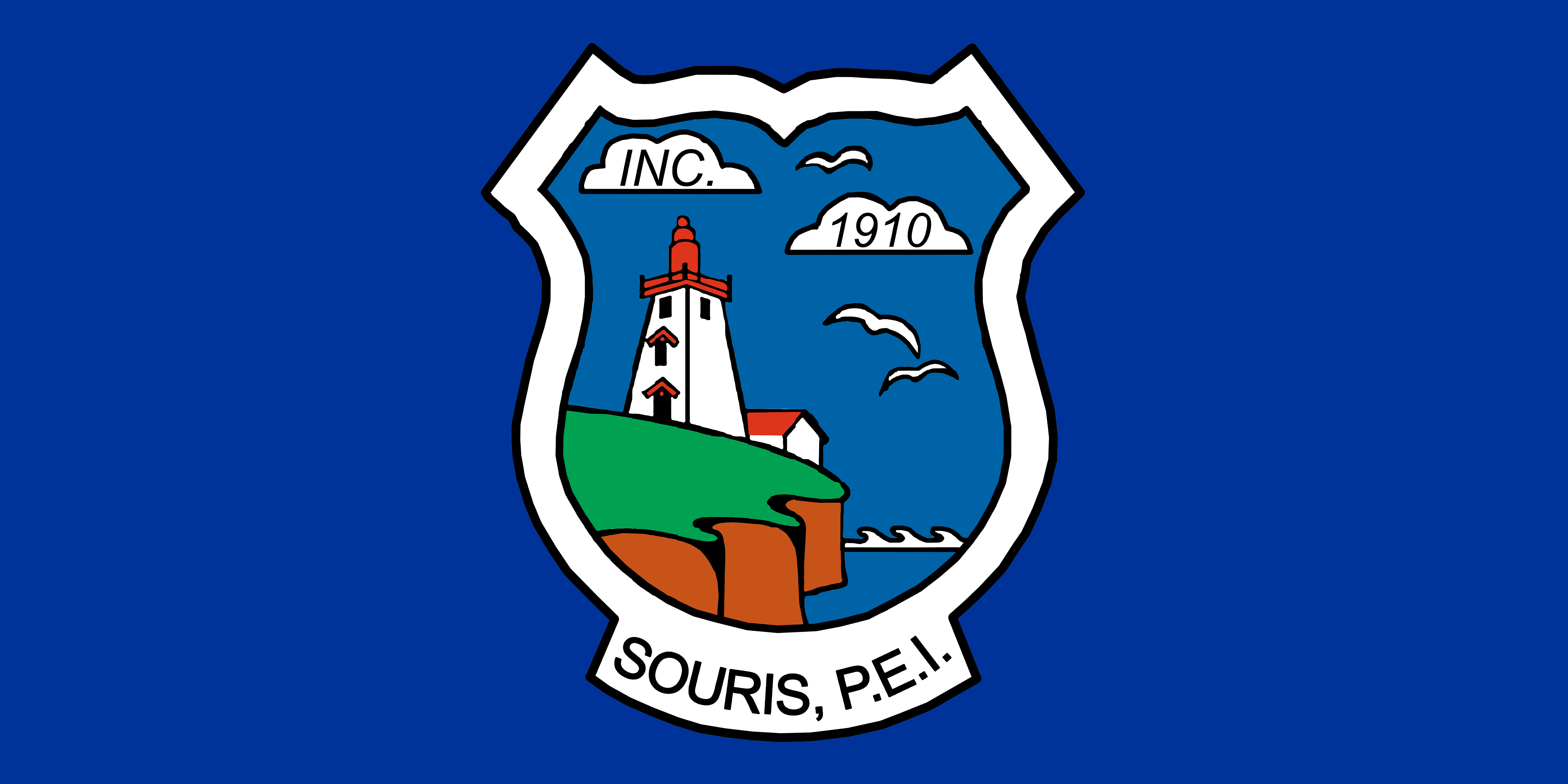
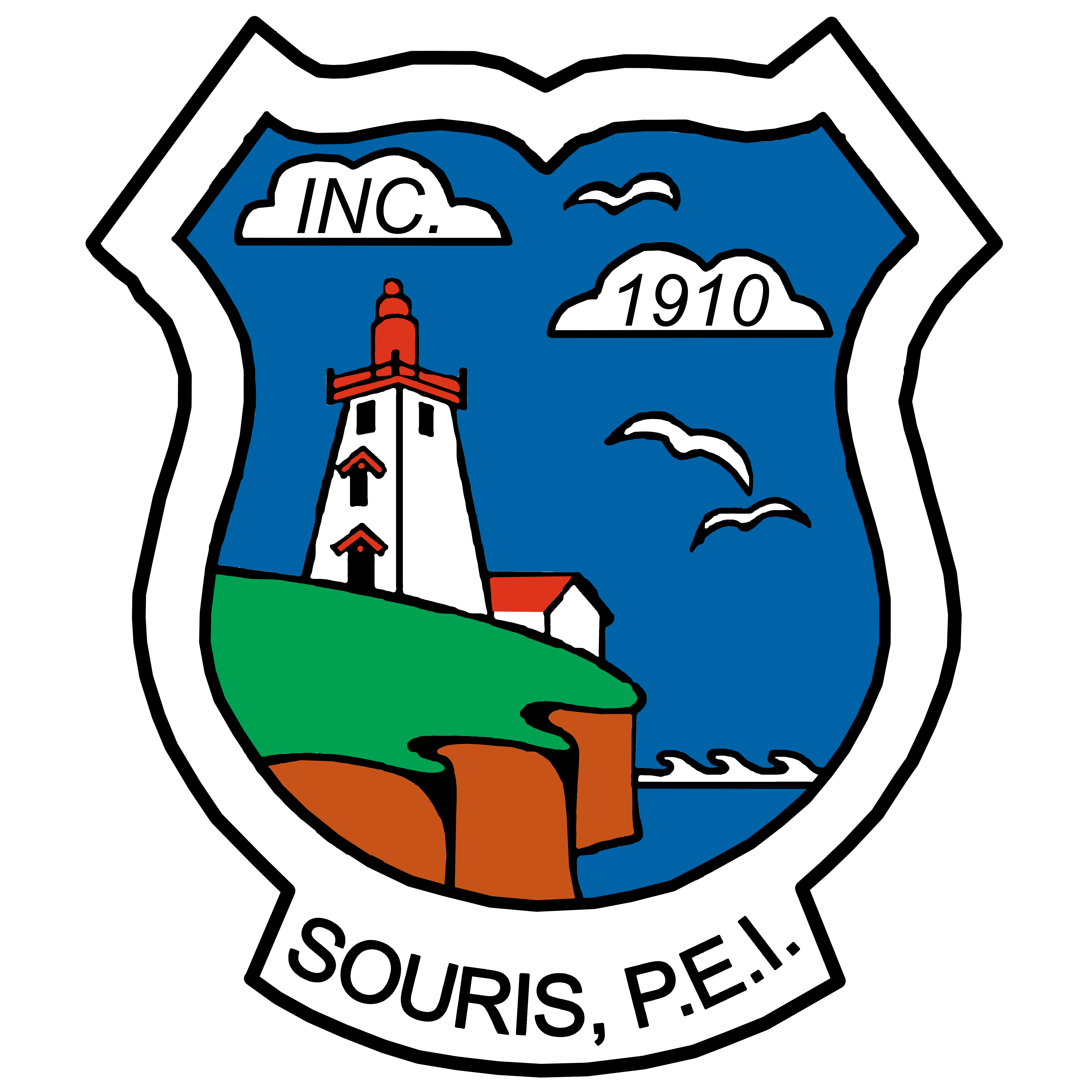
- Flag Seal

- Location of Souris in Prince Edward Island
- Coordinates: 46°21′19″N 62°15′15″W
- Country: Canada
- Province: Prince Edward Island
- County: Kings County
- Founded: 1740
- Incorporated Town: November 14, 1910

Government
  - Type: Town Council
  - Mayor: Jo-Anne Dunphy
  - Deputy Mayor: Boyd Leard
  - CAO: Shelley LaVie

Area
  - Total: 3.47 km^{2} (1.34 sq mi)
- Highest elevation: 13 m (43 ft)
- Lowest elevation: 0 m (0 ft)

Population (2016)
  - Total: 1,053
  - Density: 303.7/km^{2} (787/sq mi)
- Time zone: UTC-4 (AST)
  - Summer (DST): UTC-3 (ADT)
- Canadian Postal code: C0A
- Area code: 902
- Telephone Exchange: 208 215 327 687 743
- NTS Map: 011L08
- GNBC Code: BACII
- Website: www.sourispei.com

Souris (/ˈsuːri/) is a town in Kings County, Prince Edward Island, Canada. It is located near the northeastern tip of the province.

== History ==
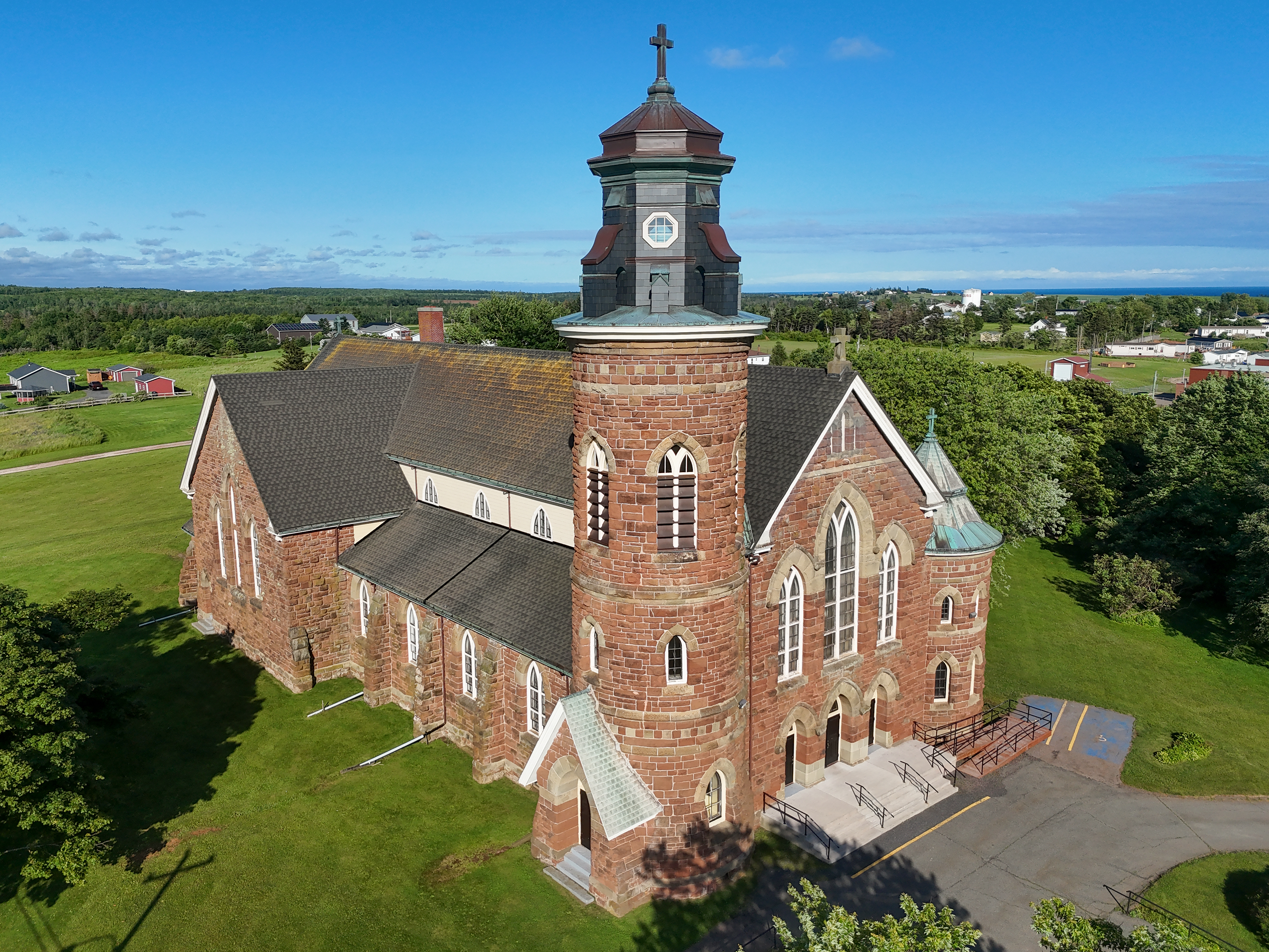
St. Mary's Roman Catholic Church, built in 1902 and rebuilt in 1928 after a fire destroyed everything besides the exterior sandstone walls

Souris was founded by Acadians in 1727 as a fishing settlement at the mouth of the Souris River. These early settlers experienced several plagues of field mice in the surrounding area during the 1720s-1760s which damaged crops. Souris is French for "mouse" and a mouse is the town's mascot. It is said that "a French vessel passing by the bay in the early 1700s was forced to cut through the waves of drowned mice and so gave the name to the area. The 1744 map of Sieur de la Roque names the bay, Havre a la Souris". Earlier names also included: Colville Bay, Grand Haven, New Bristol, and Red Cliffs.

The name likely also shares similar roots with the Souriquois and the Souris River. The French (Acadians) came to call the Micmacs the Souriquois, adopting the Indians' pidgin word for the trade language. "The term came from the Basque zurikoa (pronounced "surikoa") meaning "that of the whites." The -koa ending would be a Basque suffix denoting geographic origin and giving the word the meaning "people from Souris."

The Mi'kmaq (Mi'kmaw, Micmac or L'nu, "the people" in Mi'kmaq) were the first inhabitants in the area and had an encampment at the head of the Souris River. Several Acadian families arrived in 1740 as the first white settlers but were forced out by the British after the Siege of Louisbourg (1758). In 1765, the British government divided the island into 67 lots, Souris being lot #45 and 20,000 acres. The first census was carried out in 1798 and did not include any settlers in Souris, despite 1996 government record stating that "Scottish settlers came to the area as early as 1772, and English and Irish settlers arrived around 1810".

=== 20th century and beyond ===
Souris was incorporated into PEI on November 14, 1910.

The town has many well-preserved historic buildings, including the Matthew and MacLean Building, Souris Customs House and Post Office, and the McQuaid Building.

Souris has a well-developed harbor for fishing boats and boat repair. Since the 1960s, the Port of Souris has hosted an interprovincial ferry terminal for the service to Quebec's Magdalen Islands. The MV Madeleine II is operated by the Coopérative de transport maritime et aérien (CTMA).

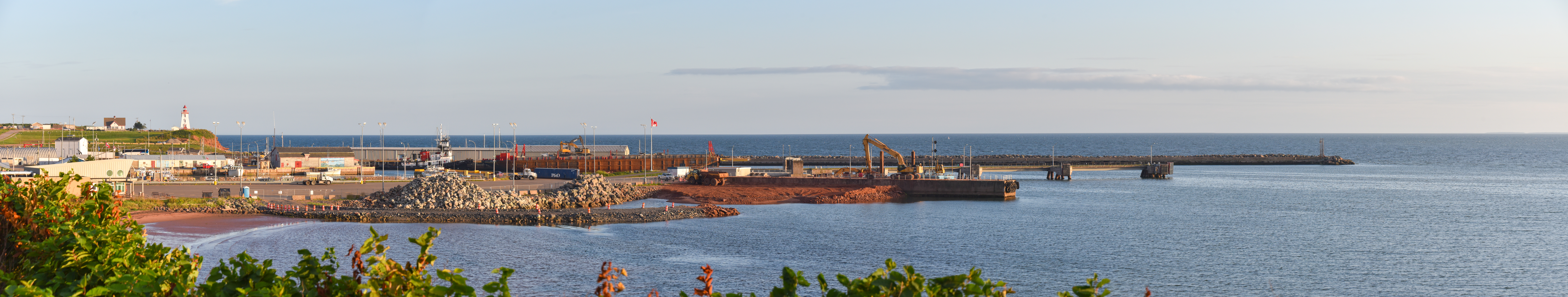
Harbor area in Souris, PEI Canada, including the Souris East Lighthouse at the top left

== Geography ==
As of 2016, the land area is 3.47 square kilometres. The Town of Souris website states that "Prince Edward Island is part of the Appalachian Region which runs from southern Quebec and Gaspésie and includes New Brunswick, Nova Scotia, Prince Edward Island and Newfoundland. There are many physiographic units with a peneplain that slopes from the highest point in the northwest down in a southeastward manner towards the ocean. The Prince Edward Island physiographic region is part of the Maritime Plain. The Maritime Plain runs around the coast of New Brunswick and Nova Scotia from the south shore of Chaleur Bay and includes Prince Edward Island and Îles-de-la-Madeleine."

== Economy ==
The economy of the area is dominated by the seasonal industries of fishing and oysters, agriculture and tourism. There are also several industrial businesses and a good retail sector. The town is home to banks, pharmacies, cafés, restaurants, gas stations, a grocery store, and other independent businesses.

== Demographics ==
Federal census population history of Souris
Year	Pop.	±%
1901	1,140	—
1911	1,089	−4.5%
1921	1,094	+0.5%
1931	1,063	−2.8%
1941	1,114	+4.8%
1951	1,183	+6.2%
1956	1,449	+22.5%
1961	1,537	+6.1%
1966	1,443	−6.1%
1971	1,393	−3.5%
1976	1,447	+3.9%
1981	1,413	−2.3%
1986	1,379	−2.4%
1991	1,333	−3.3%
1996	1,293	−3.0%
2001	1,248	−3.5%
2006	1,232	−1.3%
2011	1,173	−4.8%
2016	1,053	−10.2%
2021	1,079	+2.5%
Source: Statistics Canada

In the 2021 Census of Population conducted by Statistics Canada, Souris had a population of 1,079 living in 480 of its 533 total private dwellings, a change of 2.5% from its 2016 population of 1,053. With a land area of 3.61 km^{2} (1.39 sq mi), it had a population density of 298.9/km^{2} (774.1/sq mi) in 2021.

In 2016, persons aged 14 years and under made up 13.7% of the population, persons 15-64 made up 57.3%, and those aged 65 years and over made up 33.6%. In 2016, 93% of the population had English as their first official language compared to 94.5% for the province as a whole. The same year, 88% of the population were reported to be Canadian citizens in the census. The ethnic origins from most to least listed are: Canadian, Scottish, Irish, English, French, German, North European, Indigenous, Guatemalan, Mexican, and Czech. Roughly 30-34% of the population has a postsecondary certificate, diploma or degree, and roughly 34% of the total labour force population aged 15 years and over was reported to work in natural resources, agriculture and related production occupations, more specifically in the industry categories of agriculture, forestry, fishing and hunting.

== Education ==
Souris is home to two schools, serving grades K-12. Souris Regional School teaches students from grade K-12. Ecole La Belle Cloche is Souris' only Francophone school and teaches students from grades K-12.

École La-Belle-Cloche is situated in what used to be Rollo Bay Consolidated School, three minutes west of Souris in Rollo Bay.

== Sports ==
Souris has venues for soccer, baseball, basketball, rugby, hockey, football, ringette and other similar sports. There are also several parks in Souris.

Kitesurfing is popular in Souris and nearby beaches. Souris Beach is an intermediate-level beach, and has good wave conditions when winds blow from the Southwest. Little Harbour, Basin Head, and other nearby beaches generally have good conditions in southwest and southeast winds.

== Gallery ==
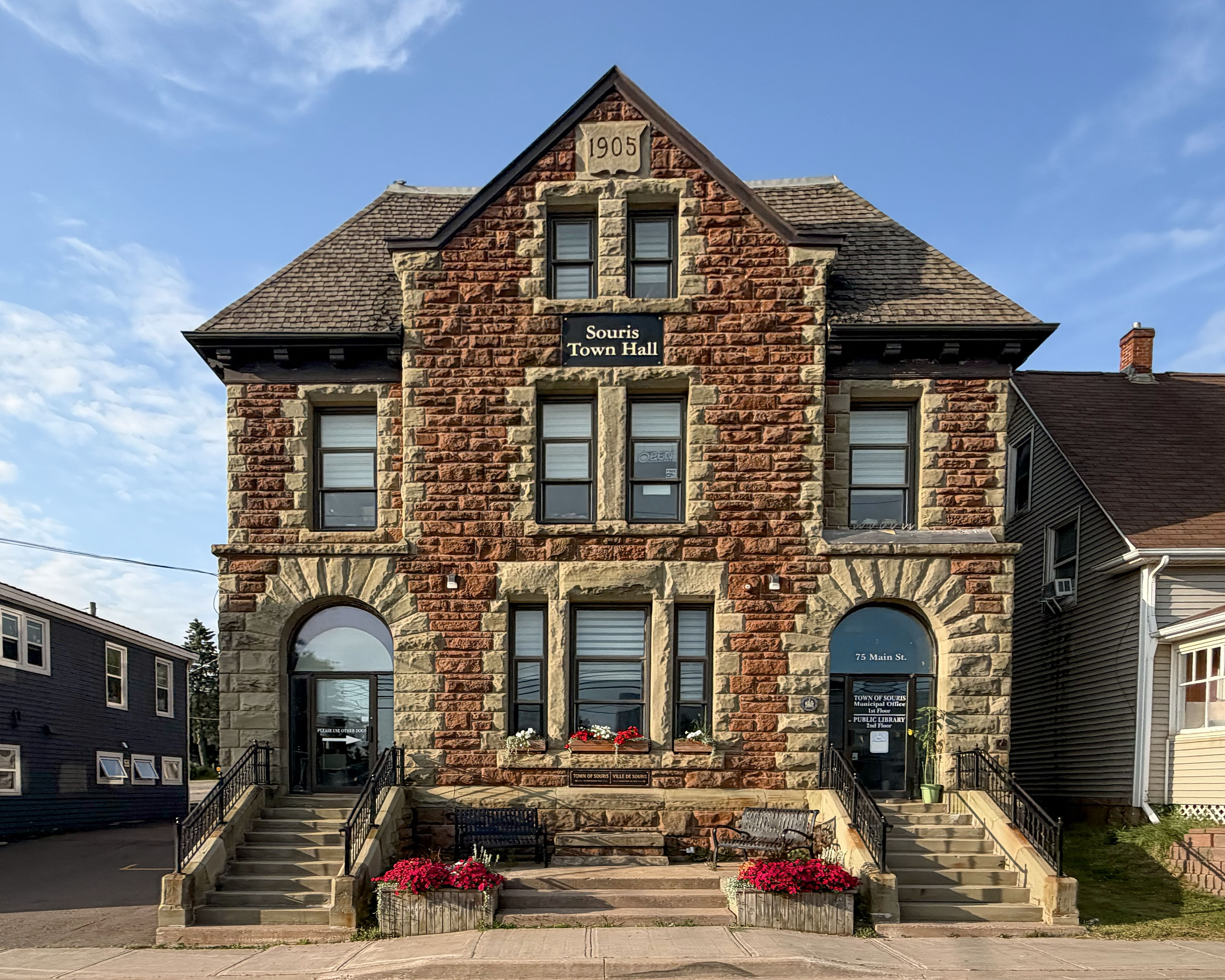
Town Hall

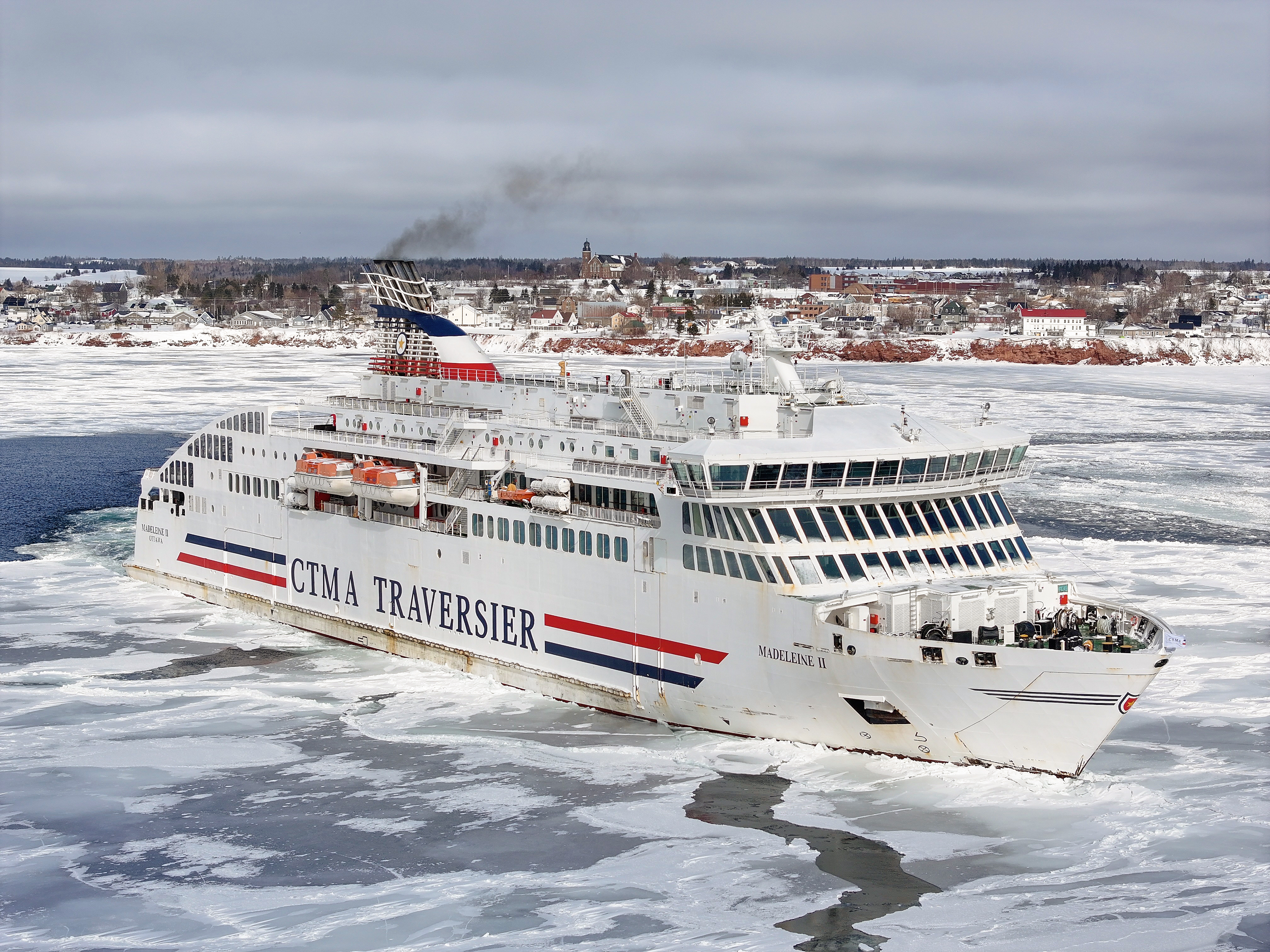
MV Madeleine II departing Souris

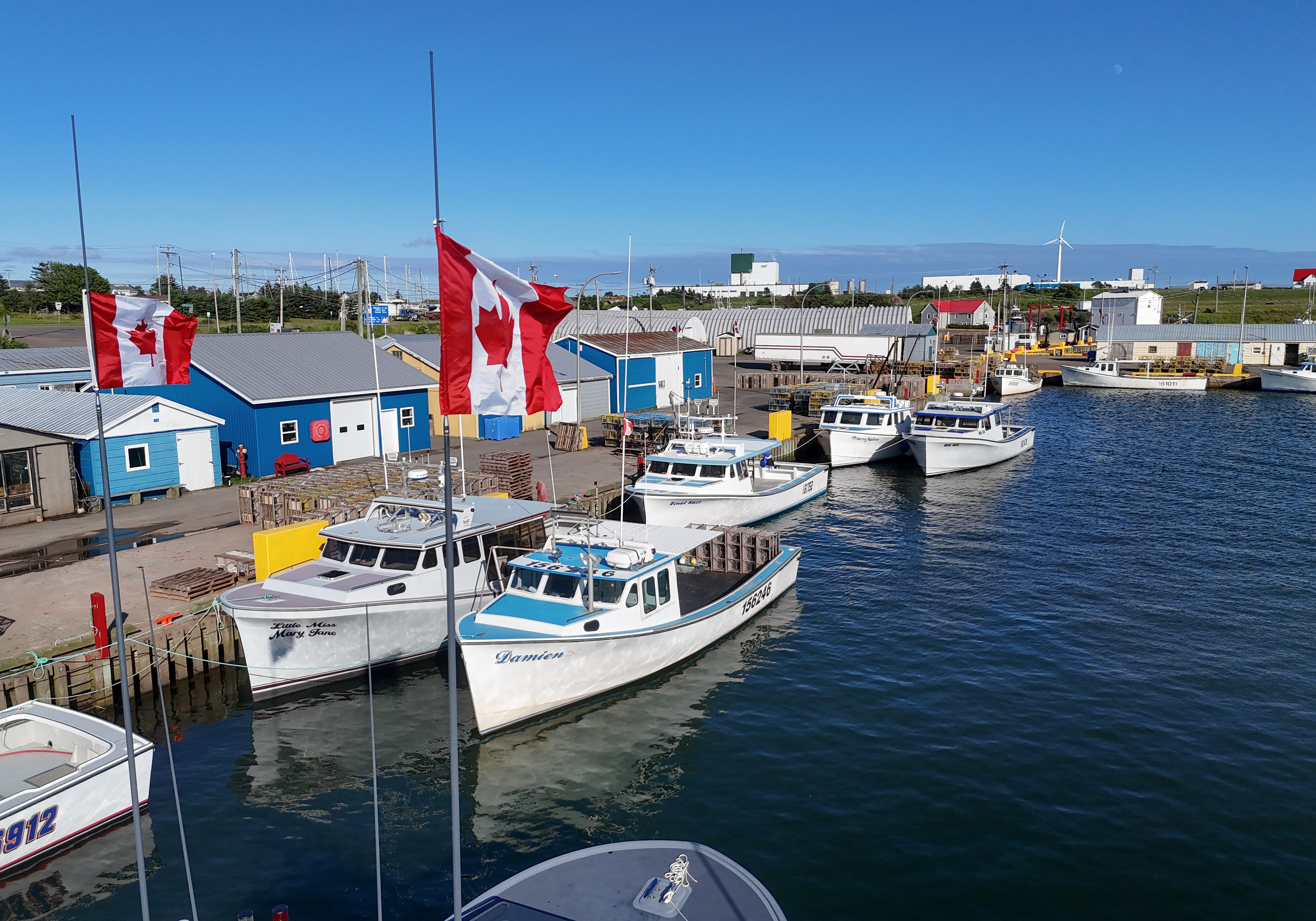
Port of Souris

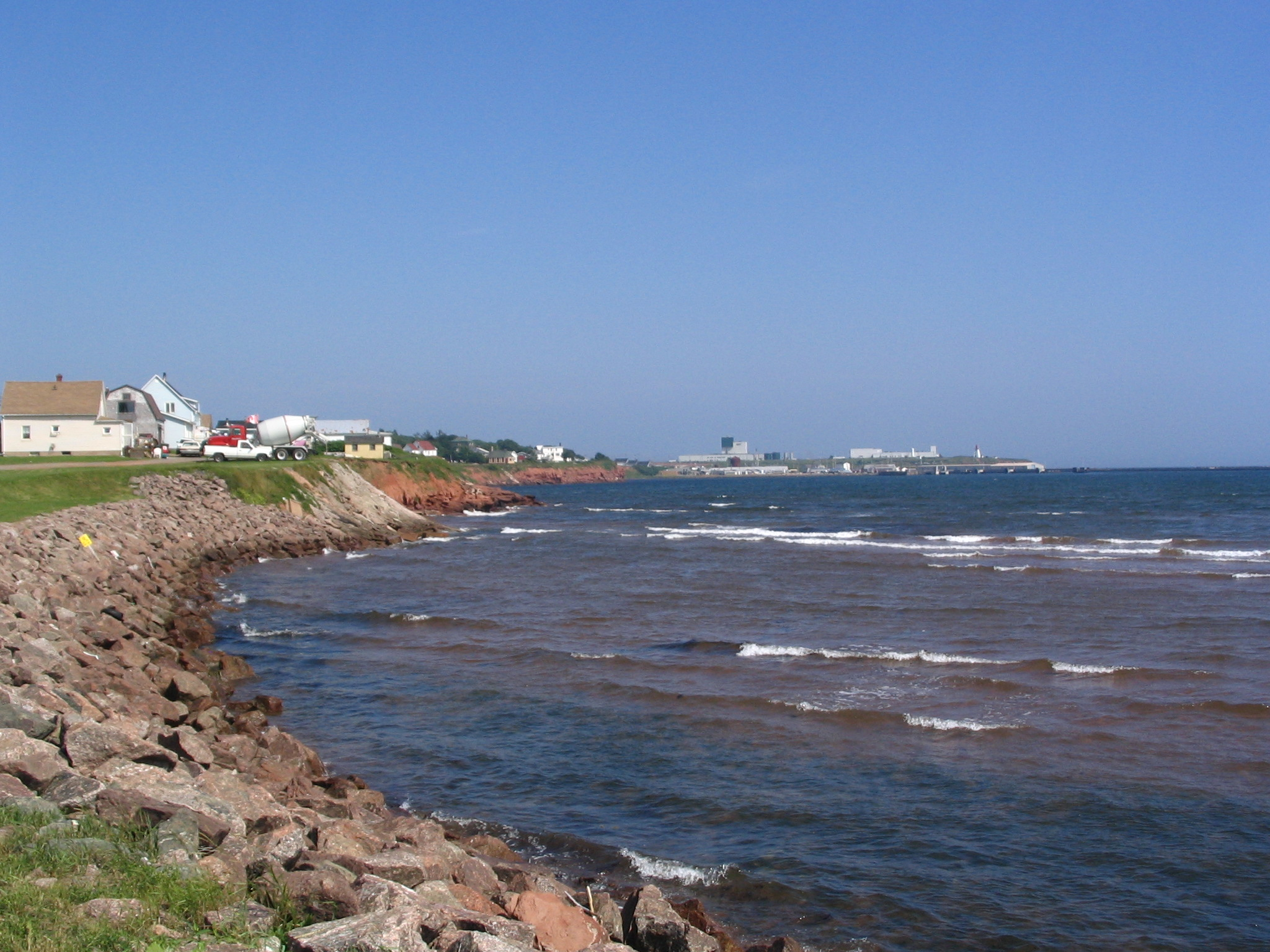
Coastline

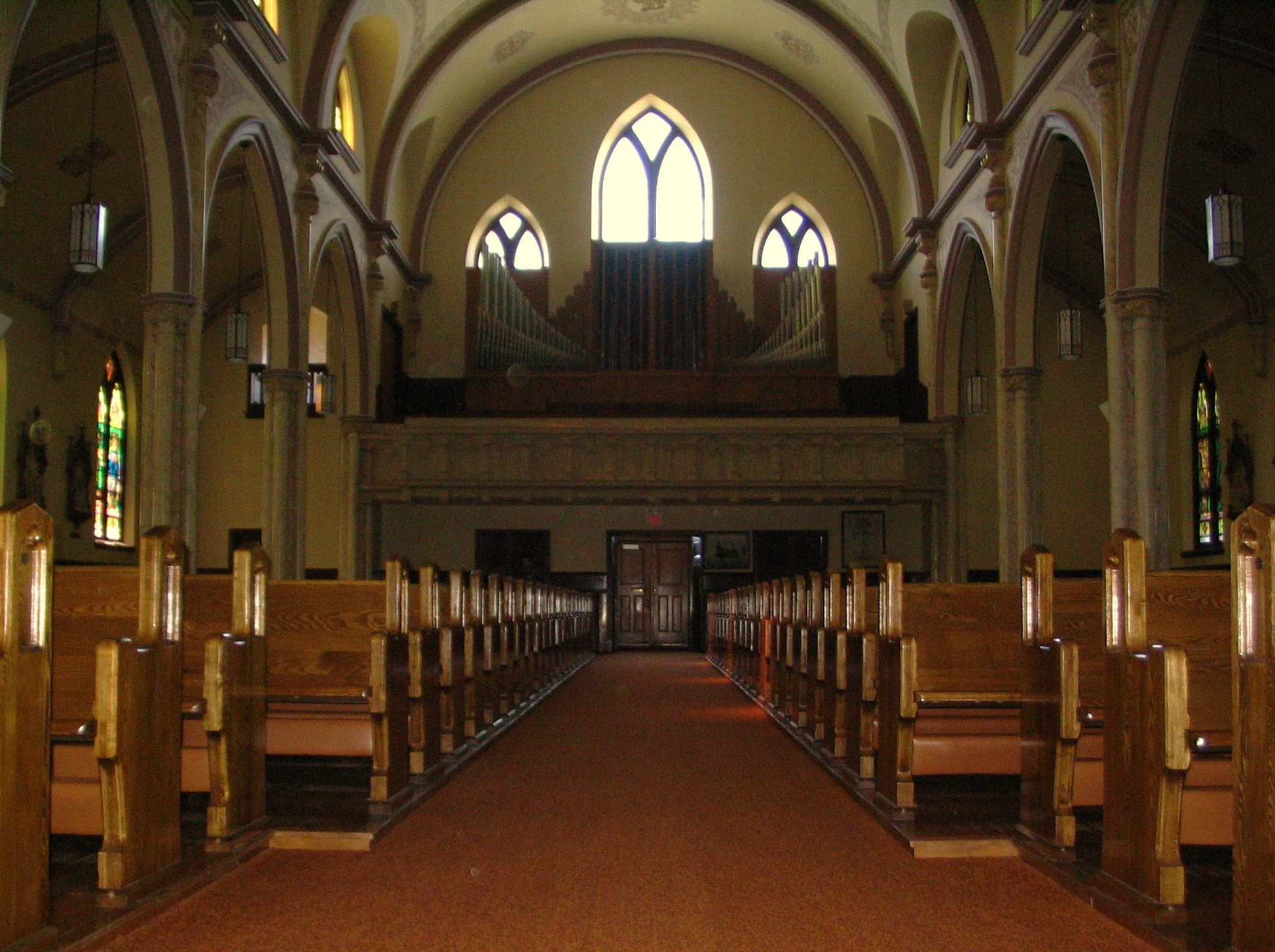
Inside of St. Mary's Church

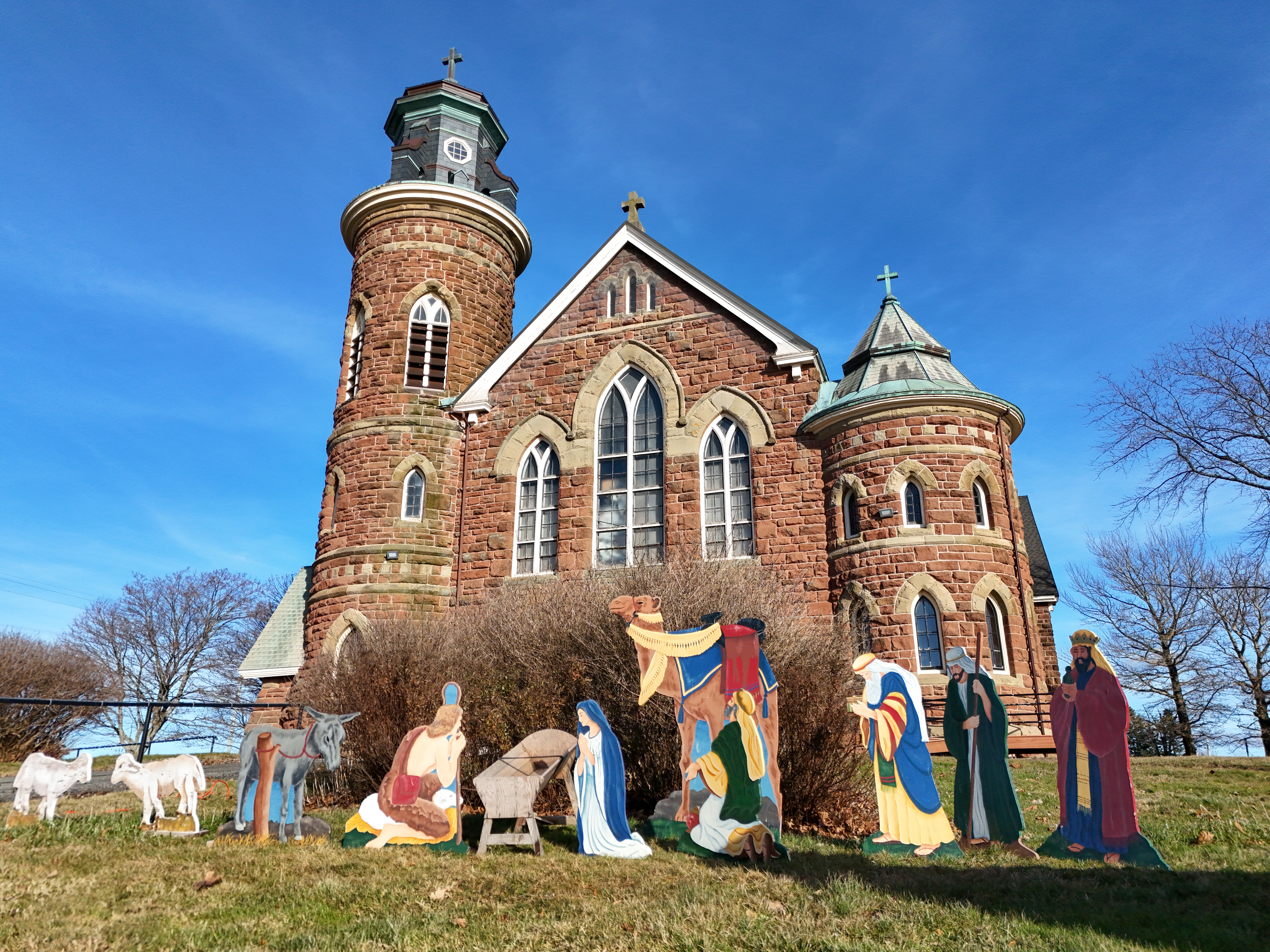
Nativity scene display

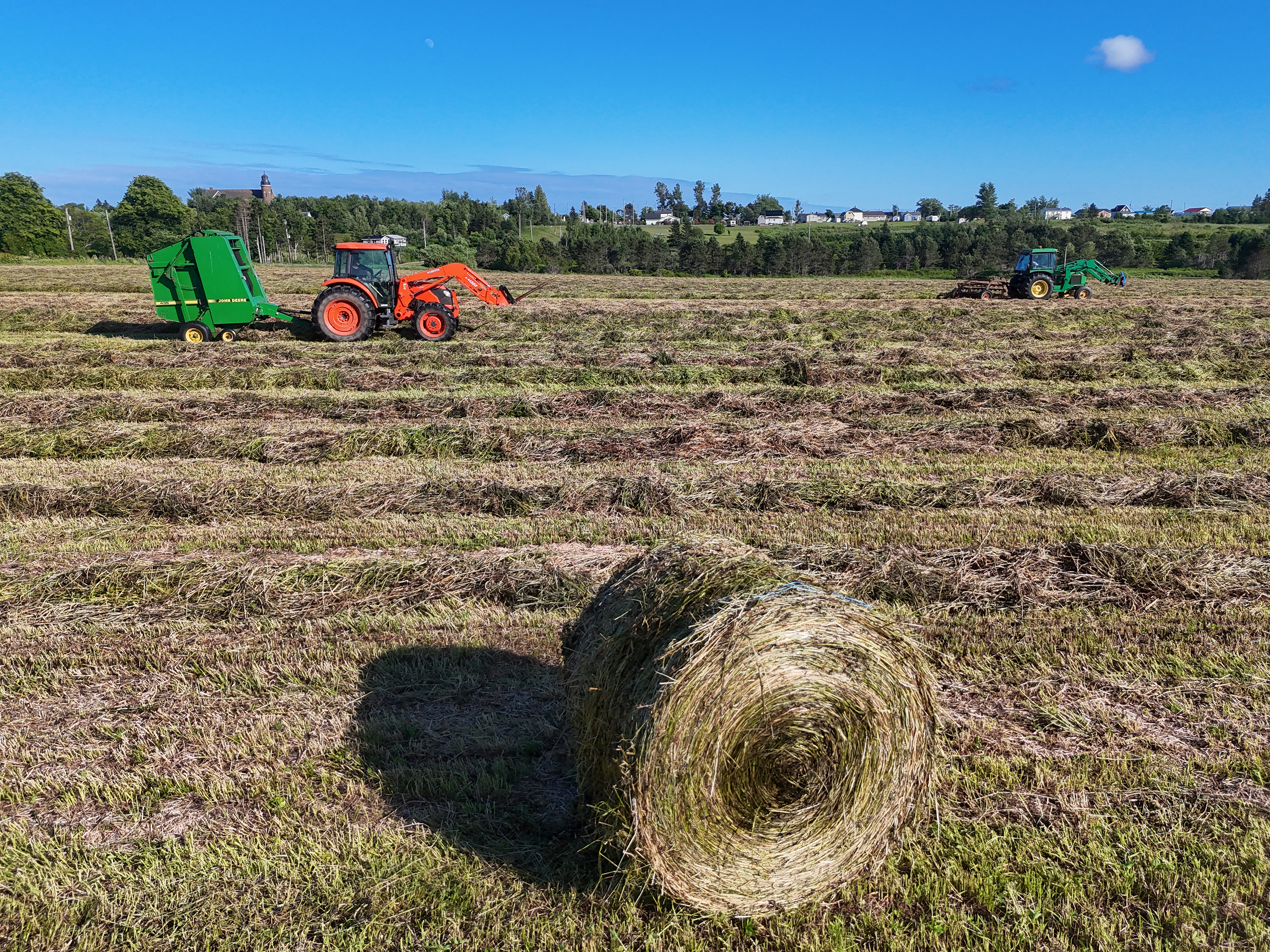
Haymaking

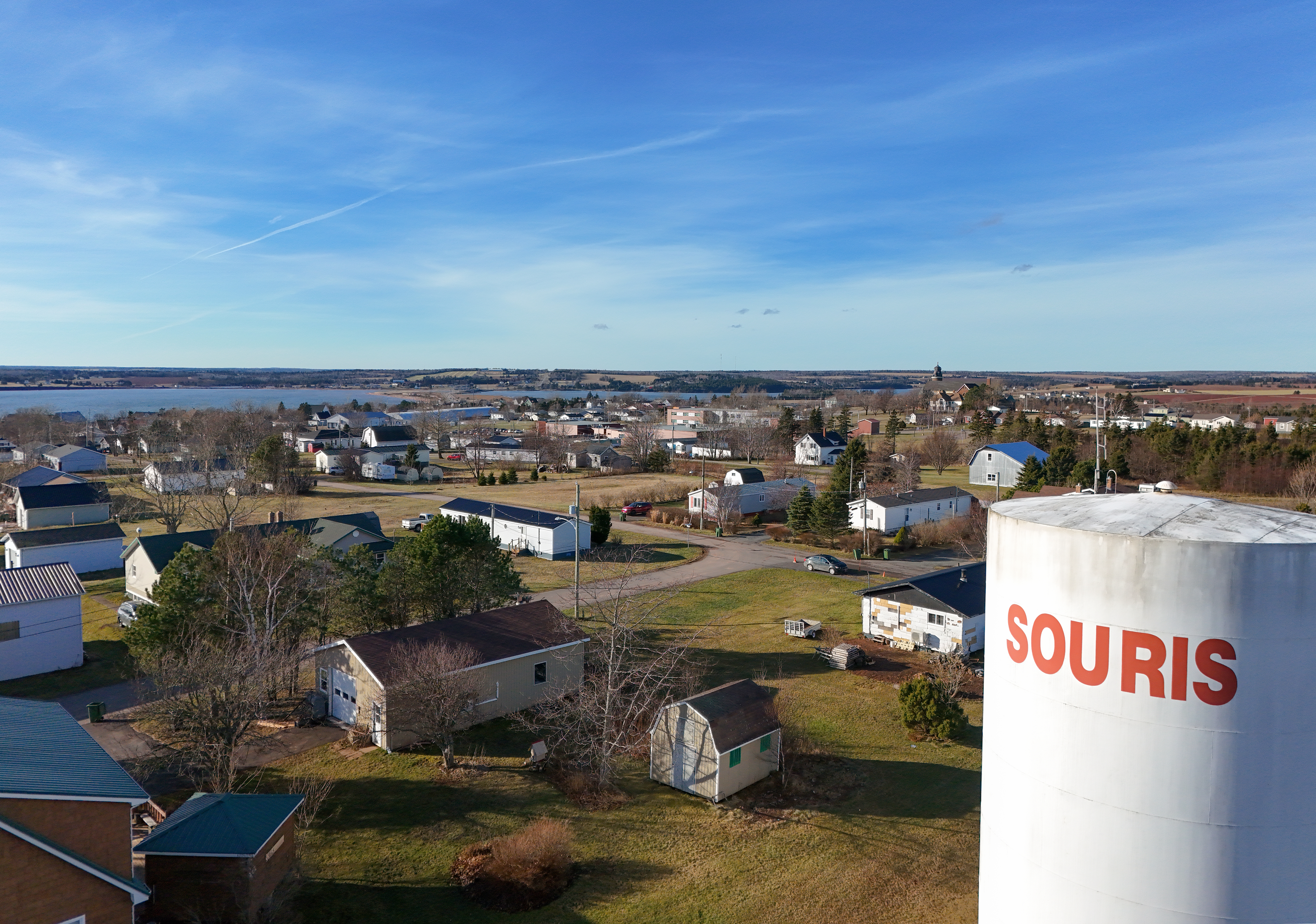
Town water tower

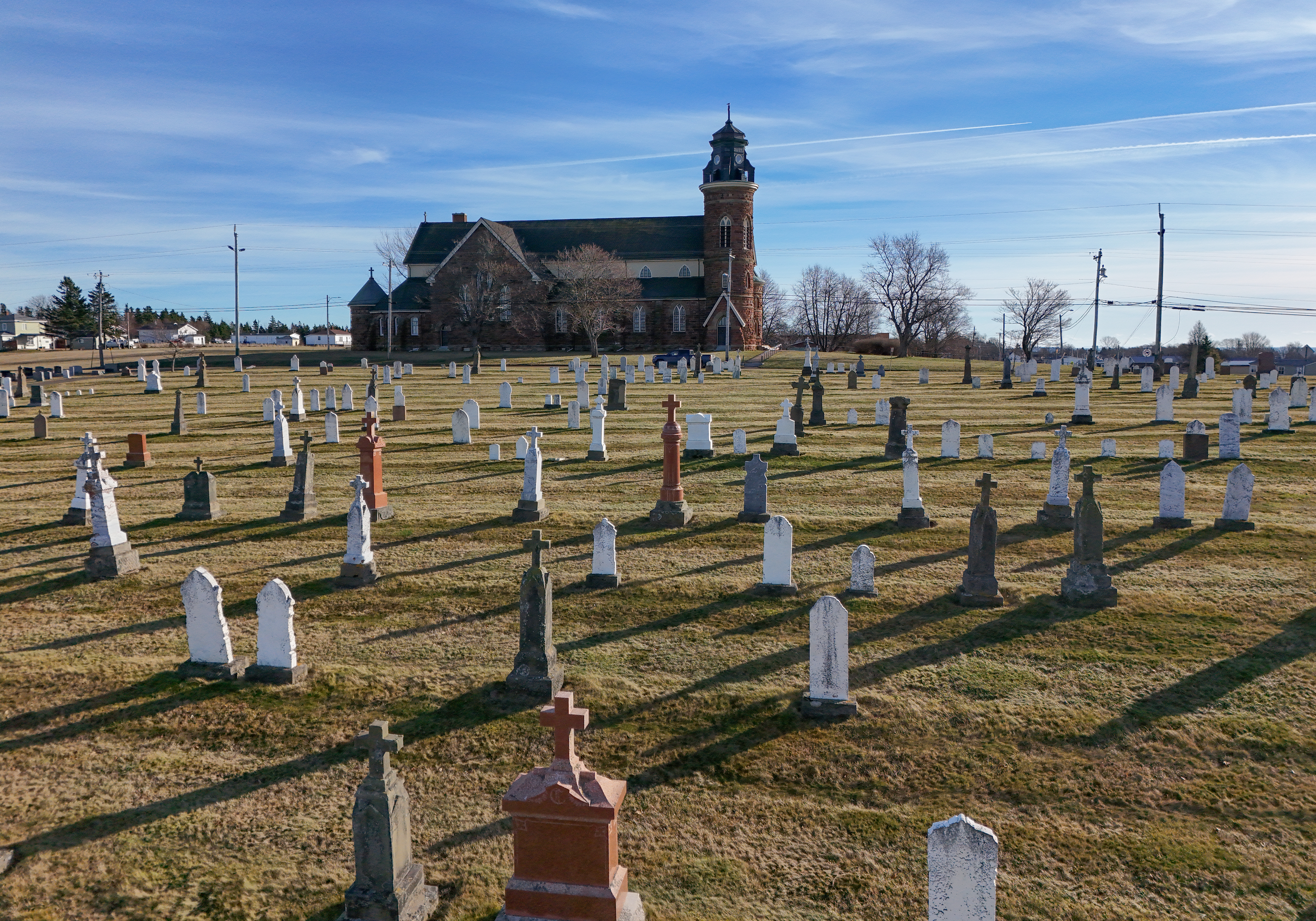
Church cemetery

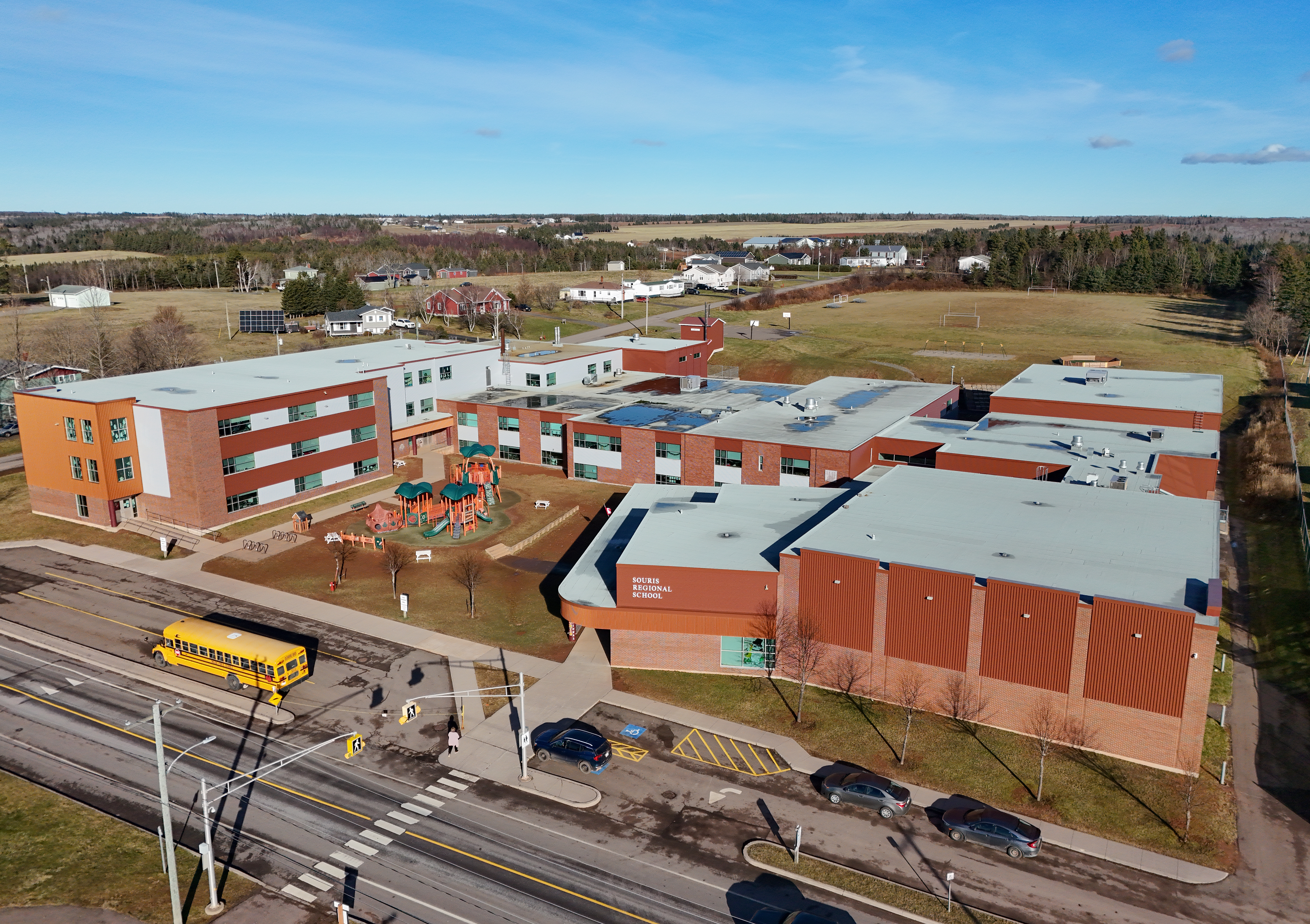
Souris Regional School
