= Public Schools Branch =

School district in Prince Edward Island, Canada

Public Schools Branch Inspire - Achieve - Belong

Location
- Stratford and Summerside, Prince Edward Island Charlottetown, Stratford, Summerside, Cornwall, Montague, Souris, Kensington, Alberton Canada
- Coordinates: 46.2266°N 63.0873°W

District information
- Chair of the board: Stephanie Arnold (chair); Tracy Beaulieu (director)
- Schools: 38 elementary schools; 8 junior high schools; 10 high schools

Students and staff
- Students: 20,000
- Faculty: 3500

Other information
- Board Members: Kevin Rochford, Beckie Keezer, Peter Fullerton, Karen Clare, Gaylene Carragher, Andrew MacFarlane, Wade Czank, Marcella Byrne
- Website: edu.princeedwardisland.ca/psb/

Public Schools Branch (PSB), formerly the English Language School Board or ELSB, is a Canadian school district in Prince Edward Island.

The Public Schools Branch is an Anglophone district operating 56 public schools (gr. K–12) in Prince County, Queens County and Kings County. It maintains offices in Stratford and Summerside It currently enrolls approximately 20,000 students and has about 3500 employees.

== History ==
The English Language School Board was created in 2012 when Eastern School District and Western School Board were merged. The Board took office on January 1, 2013.

On November 5, 2015, the PEI Government announced that it would be dissolving the English Language School Board, replacing it with the Public Schools Branch.

== Family of Schools ==
=== Bluefield Family of Schools ===
- Bluefield Senior High School
- Central Queens Elementary School
- East Wiltshire Intermediate School
- Eliot River Elementary School
- Englewood Consolidated School
- Gulf Shore Consolidated School
- Westwood Primary School

=== Charlottetown Family of Schools ===
- Birchwood Intermediate School
- Charlottetown Rural Senior High School
- Glen Stewart Primary School
- L.M. Montgomery Elementary School
- Parkdale Elementary School
- Prince Street Elementary School
- Queen Charlotte Intermediate School
- Sherwood Elementary School
- Spring Park Elementary School
- St. Jean Elementary School
- Stonepark Intermediate School
- Stratford Elementary School
- West Kent Elementary School
- West Royalty Elementary School

=== Kensington Family of Schools ===
- Kensington Intermediate Senior High School
- Queen Elizabeth Elementary School

=== Kinkora Family of Schools ===
- Amherst Cove Consolidated School
- Kinkora Regional High School
- Somerset Elementary School

=== Montague Family of Schools ===
- Belfast Consolidated School
- Cardigan Consolidated School
- Georgetown Consolidated School
- Montague Consolidated School
- Montague Intermediate School
- Montague Regional High School
- Southern Kings Consolidated School
- Vernon River Consolidated School

=== Morell Family of Schools ===
- Morell Regional High School
  - Morell Consolidated School
  - Mt. Stewart Consolidated School

=== Souris Family of Schools ===
- Souris Regional School

=== Three Oaks Family of Schools ===
- Three Oaks Senior High School
  - Athena Consolidated School
  - Miscouche Consolidated School
  - Summerside Intermediate School
    - Elm Street Elementary School
    - Greenfield Elementary School
    - Parkside Elementary School

=== Westisle Family of Schools ===
- Westisle Composite High School
  - Hernewood Intermediate School
    - Bloomfield Elementary School
    - Ellerslie elementary super school
    - O’Leary Elementary School
  - M. E. Callaghan Intermediate School
    - Alberton Elementary School
    - St. Louis Elementary School
    - Tignish Elementary School

== See also ==
- List of schools in Prince Edward Island
- List of school districts in Prince Edward Island
- Higher education in Prince Edward Island
