= List of school districts in Prince Edward Island =

There are two school districts in the province of Prince Edward Island, Canada. Formerly five, the number has decreased with merges in some areas of the province.

== Current school districts ==
School district	Headquarters	Sector
Commission scolaire de langue française	Abrams Village	Francophone
Public Schools Branch	Stratford / Summerside	Anglophone

== Former school districts ==
School district	Headquarters	Sector	Reason of non-being
Eastern School District	Stratford	Anglophone	Merged into ELSB
Regional School Unit 1	Elmsdale	Anglophone	Merged into Western School Board
Regional School Unit 2	Summerside	Anglophone	Merged into Western School Board
Regional School Unit 3	?	Anglophone	Merged into Eastern School District
Regional School Unit 4	?	Anglophone	Merged into Eastern School District
Regional School Unit 5	Charlottetown	Francophone	Merged into CSLF
Western School Board	Summerside	Anglophone	Merged into ELSB

== See also ==
- List of schools in Prince Edward Island
- Higher education in Prince Edward Island
