= Bothwell, Prince Edward Island =

Locality in Prince Edward Island, Canada

Bothwell
- Locality
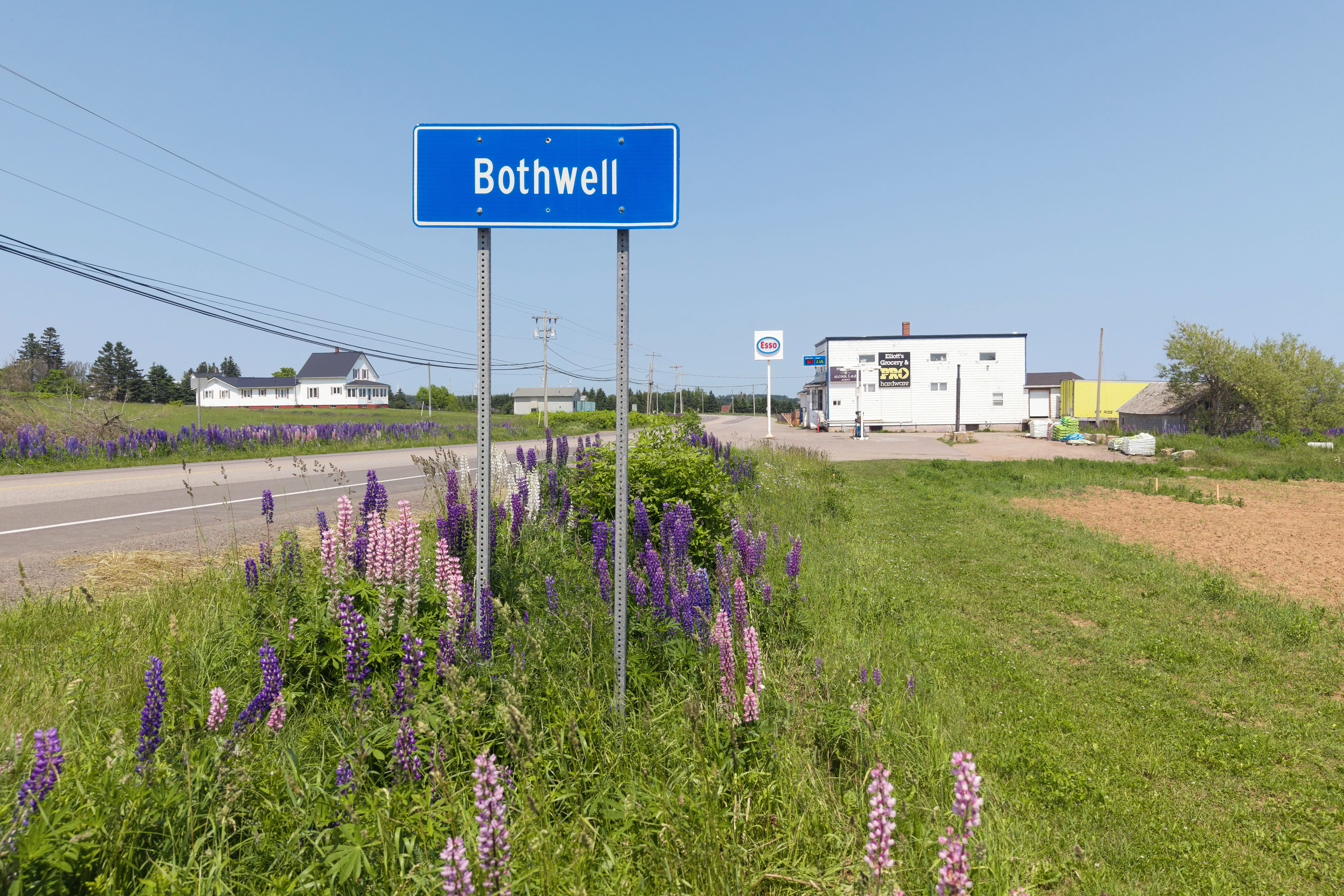
- View along East Point Road, 2026

- Location within Prince Edward Island Location within Canada
- Coordinates: 46°24′14″N 62°04′49″W
- Country: Canada
- Province: Prince Edward Island
- County: Kings County
- Lot: Lot 47
- Time zone: UTC−04:00 (AST)
  - Summer (DST): UTC−03:00 (ADT)
- Canadian postal code: C0A
- Area code(s): 902 and 782

Bothwell is a locality and unincorporated community in Kings County, Prince Edward Island, Canada. It is located in Lot 47, east of Souris, near the eastern end of the province. Bothwell had a post office from 1864 to 1913. Elliott's General Store, located along East Point Rd, is a local store offering groceries, fuel, hardware, and mail receiving.
