= List of lakes of Prince Edward Island =

This is a list of lakes and other bodies of waters in Prince Edward Island, Canada.

Lakes in Prince Edward Island are complicated, and what is considered a lake and what is not can vary with little relation to size or depth. In many cases the terms pond and barachois are both used interchangeably with lake, for example St. Peters Lake is also known as Stukeley Pond. Some ponds or barachois have their sandbars flooded and become coves, like Ramsays Pond, which retains its name but is now saltwater.

While the definition for lake varies in size, for this article, the minimum size for a lake will be 20 acres, the criterion set by RAMSAR.

== List ==
Water bodies ≥ 8 hectares (i.e. lakes)
Name	Concise Term	County	Area (ha)	Coordinates
Condons Pond	Lake or Barachois	Kings	13.77	46.065532°N 62.472271°W
Diligent Pond	Lake or Barachois	Kings	28.56	46.441154°N 62.000474°W
Hardys Pond	Lake	Queens	8.19	46.330642°N 63.118462°W
Little Miminegash Pond	Lake or Barachois	Prince	33.36	46.826315°N 64.262351°W
Long Pond (Queens)	Lake	Queens	16.78	46.413505°N 63.086359°W
Miminegash Pond	Lake or Barachois	Prince	69.25	46.86582°N 64.230212°W
Morrisons Pond	Lake	Prince	11.84	46.557527°N 63.63754°W
Nail Pond	Lake or Barachois	Prince	63.44	46.996474°N 64.052699°W
North Lake	Lake	Kings	112.97	46.462136°N 62.081344°W
O'Keefes Lake	Lake	Queens	47.86	46.248179°N 62.815477°W
Round Pond	Lake or Barachois	Prince	20.43	46.918243°N 63.987363°W
Scales Pond	Reservoir	Prince	9.43	46.346187°N 63.60281°W
South Lake	Lake or Barachois	Kings	163.91	46.420397°N 62.031396°W
St. Peters Lake	Lake	Kings	78.49	46.431121°N 62.76799°W
Whitlocks Pond	Lake	Kings	41.31	46.349315°N 62.526185°W
Wiseners Pond	Lake	Queens	36.59	46.261403°N 62.878833°W
Black Pond	Lake or Barachois	Prince	12.04	46.922494°N 64.189609°W
Pisquid Pond	Lake	Kings	42.24	46.315615°N 62.789663°W
MacEacherns Lake	Lake	Queens	10.73	46.249918°N 63.023261°W
Leards Pond	Lake	Kings	13.48	46.297702°N 62.713306°W
Adams Pond	Lake or Barachois	Queens	8.48	46.551445°N 63.607362°W
Skinners Pond	Lake	Prince	14.02	46.960715°N 64.129783°W
Graham Pond	Lake	Kings	12.79	46.096544°N 62.45821°W
Wrights Pond	Lake	Prince	9.8	46.328429°N 63.718423°W
Graham Rogers Lake	Lake	Queens	187.12	46.268087°N 63.189871°W
Point Deroche Pond	Lake	Queens	126.66	46.418163°N 62.934675°W
Campbells Pond	Lake	Queens	19.6	46.534348°N 63.544433°W
Prowses Pond / Ben's Lake	Lake	Queens	9.09	46.081454°N 62.742067°W
Cousins Pond	Lake	Queens	12.9	46.539582°N 63.565665°W
Schooner Pond	Lake	Kings	9.87	46.454129°N 62.658356°W
Glenfinnan Lake	Lake	Queens	22.55	46.296801°N 62.954698°W
MacLures Pond (Murray River)	Reservoir	Kings	63.78	46.012234°N 62.62541°W
Naufrage Pond	Lake	Kings	14.5	46.464823°N 62.419963°W
Little Harbour Pond	Lake	Kings	16.65	46.363441°N 62.177782°W
Long Pond (Kings)	Lake	Kings	14.32	46.454742°N 62.674187°W
Launching Pond	Lake	Kings	27.22	46.221654°N 62.419573°W
Indian River Pond	Lake	Prince	15.3	46.460997°N 63.669062°W
MacDonalds Pond (Forest Hill)	Lake	Kings	15.39	46.355418°N 62.586859°W
Little Pond	Lake or Barachois	Kings	62.6	46.273208°N 62.385557°W
Black Pond	Lake	Kings	38.63	46.371998°N 62.165172°W
Leech Pond	Lake	Kings	14.81	45.984441°N 62.552728°W
Bog Pond	Lake	Kings	15.15	46.453048°N 62.693208°W
Lake Verde	Lake	Queens	15	46.239163°N 62.885769°W
Afton Lake	Lake	Queens	19.22	46.396528°N 62.920822°W
East Lake	Lake	Kings	19	46.457376°N 62.017562°W
Lake of Shining Waters	Lake	Queens	13.48	46.495101°N 63.387679°W
MacKeys Pond	Lake	Queens	12.5	46.473876°N 63.481108°W
Dalvay Lake	Lake	Queens	19.36	46.412939°N 63.070848°W

Water bodies < 8 hectares (i.e. ponds)
Name	Concise Term	County	Area (ha)	Coordinates
Andrews Pond	Pond	Queens	3.52	46.273978°N 63.110656°W
Feehans Pond	Pond	Queens	7.79	46.398886°N 62.871868°W
Leckys Pond	Pond	Prince	1.73	46.475487°N 63.96407°W
MacAulays Pond	Pond	Kings	0.41	46.265596°N 62.712254°W
MacLeans Pond	Pond	Queens	1.31	46.202758°N 62.834308°W
MacLures Pond	Pond or Barachois	Kings	2.4	46.074964°N 62.464305°W
Mooneys Pond	Pond	Kings	1.45	46.294212°N 62.770088°W
Paynters Pond	Pond	Queens	1.32	46.488814°N 63.545646°W
Portage Lake	Pond	Prince	2.19	46.668824°N 64.074126°W
Websters Pond	Pond	Kings	0.93	46.416667°N 62.65°W
Hydes Pond	Pond	Queens	2.79	46.223854°N 63.214369°W
Sheep Pond	Pond	Kings	3.03	46.340937°N 62.281401°W
McVarishs Pond	Pond	Kings	0.8	46.405367°N 62.256109°W
Sheas Pond	Pond	Prince	2.3	46.975877°N 64.000374°W
MacEwens Pond	Pond	Kings	3.06	46.404282°N 62.795008°W
Lewis Pond	Pond	Kings	1.18	46.431707°N 62.578955°W
Thompsons Pond	Pond	Prince	1.56	46.541967°N 63.679655°W
Blanchards Pond	Pond	Prince	3.22	46.91923°N 64.040586°W
Leslies Pond	Pond	Kings	5.62	46.351286°N 62.284137°W
Dalvay Pond	Pond	Queens	1.64	46.416336°N 63.07935°W
Arsenaults Pond	Pond	Prince	3.21	46.941037°N 64.040338°W
Hatchery Pond	Pond	Queens	0.97	46.215408°N 63.099363°W
Johnny Belinda Pond	Pond	Kings	1.15	46.361256°N 62.4439°W
Clarks Pond	Pond	Queens	0.4	46.328816°N 62.882438°W
MacMillan Pond	Pond	Queens	1.95	46.216733°N 62.804666°W
MacPhersons Pond	Pond	Kings	3.65	46.238858°N 62.422284°W
Brooklyn Pond	Pond	Kings	3.24	46.095097°N 62.684177°W
Banks Pond	Pond	Prince	0.19	46.650000°N 63.950000°W
Websters Pond	Pond	Prince	1.25	46.230351°N 63.605859°W
Jordans Pond	Pond	Kings	0.85	46.412313°N 62.751507°W
MacDonalds Pond	Pond	Kings	1.49	46.35°N 62.466667°W
Stewarts Pond	Pond	Queens	2.25	46.239784°N 63.47636°W
Norris Pond	Pond or Barachois	Kings	1.54	46.348475°N 62.236347°W
Munns Pond	Pond	Kings	0.81	46.208683°N 62.657664°W
Taylors Pond	Pond	Prince	2.71	46.548032°N 63.693231°W
Milligans Pond	Pond	Prince	2.26	46.689147°N 64.011559°W
MacVanes Pond	Pond or Barachois	Kings	7.5	46.407583°N 62.067272°W
Upper MacLures Pond	Pond	Kings	7.12	46.031977°N 62.664727°W
Morrison Pond	Pond	Kings	2.61	46.24818°N 62.452983°W
Black Lake	Pond	Queens	1.97	45.99741°N 62.869621°W
Moss Lake	Pond	Queens	5.27	46.231302°N 62.912358°W
Perrys Pond	Pond	Prince	0.34	46.427752°N 63.932577°W
Bells Pond	Pond	Queens	4.79	46.389178°N 63.338663°W
Hunters Pond	Pond	Prince	0.45	46.512882°N 63.661056°W
Roseberry Pond	Pond	Queens	0.9	46.039155°N 62.871022°W
Mellishs Pond	Pond	Kings	1.41	46.194422°N 62.680835°W
MacKinnons Pond	Pond	Kings	2.05	46.41164°N 62.744171°W
Canns Pond	Pond	Prince	1.21	46.489717°N 63.61259°W
Lake Aberdeen	Pond	Queens	0.43	46.200743°N 63.151818°W
Dixons Pond	Pond	Kings	1.56	46.425399°N 62.163394°W
Foleys Pond	Pond or Barachois	Prince	7.64	46.858016°N 64.010725°W
Knox Pond	Reservoir	Kings	7.28	46.157695°N 62.67834°W
Fitzpatricks Pond	Pond	Kings	2.13	46.24089°N 62.512761°W
McKays Pond	Pond	Queens	1.31	46.362977°N 63.157154°W
Roseberry Twin Pond	Pond	Queens	0.5	46.060911°N 62.881134°W
Carraghers Pond	Pond	Queens	1.77	46.285782°N 63.34353°W
MacDonalds Pond (Glenwilliam)	Pond	Kings	0.62	46.044344°N 62.649905°W
MacDonalds Pond (Dingwells Mills)	Pond	Kings	1.66	46.350000°N 62.466667°W
MacInnis Pond	Pond	Kings	2.26	46.451747°N 62.273564°W
MacPhersons Pond	Pond	Kings	3.7	46.238858°N 62.422284°W
Doyles Pond	Pond	Queens	2.71	46.371514°N 62.876691°W
Munns Pond	Pond	Kings	0.88	46.208683°N 62.657664°W
Mathesons Pond	Pond	Queens	2.36	46.102086°N 62.739603°W
Rayners Pond	Pond	Prince	2.31	46.837712°N 64.025163°W
Finlaysons Pond	Pond	Kings	6.81	46.041802°N 62.569778°W
Gillis Pond	Pond or Barachois	Kings	3.25	46.465752°N 62.354975°W
Marshalls Pond	Pond	Queens	1.88	46.391074°N 63.119893°W
Bernards Pond	Pond	Queens	0.62	46.516643°N 63.521872°W
Creeds Pond	Pond	Kings	0.33	46.107723°N 62.52078°W
Valleyfield Pond	Pond	Kings	2.04	46.140521°N 62.674737°W
Glenwood Pond	Pond or Reservoir	Prince	4.3	46.648143°N 64.320063°W
Ings Pond	Pond	Queens	0.85	46.22568°N 63.027607°W
Moores Pond	Pond	Queens	0.17	46.279076°N 63.189663°W
Balderstons Pond	Pond	Queens	0.21	46.30366°N 63.336162°W
Branders Pond	Pond	Queens	3.46	46.546389°N 63.588236°W
MacNeils Pond	Pond	Queens	0.53	46.265607°N 63.157395°W
Comptons Pond	Pond	Prince	1.83	46.439786°N 63.792877°W
MacNeills Pond	Pond	Kings	1.7	46.203224°N 62.70418°W
Steeles Pond	Pond	Kings	5.05	46.110334°N 62.458489°W

== See also ==
- List of rivers of Prince Edward Island
- Geography of Prince Edward Island
