= Lot 49 =

Lot 49 may refer to:

- The Crying of Lot 49, a novel by Thomas Pynchon
- Lot 49, Prince Edward Island, a township in Canada
