= John MacDonald of Glenaladale =

Scottish-born soldier, landowner, and colonizer (1742–1810)

John MacDonald of Glenaladale (29 September 1742 – 28 December 1810) was a Scottish-born soldier, land owner and colonizer. He played an important role in bringing Scottish settlers to Prince Edward Island, Canada.

The son of Alexander M’Donald of Glenaladale (often spelt Glenalladale), the head of the Glenaladale branch of the Clan Macdonald of Clanranald, and Margaret MacDonell of Scotus, he was born at Glenaladale and studied at the Catholic seminary at Regensburg. After his return to Scotland in 1761, he became the 8th laird of Glenaladale. Dissatisfied with his situation in Scotland, in 1771 he mortgaged his lands in Scotland to his cousin and purchased Lot 36 on St. John's Island (later Prince Edward Island) from the Lord Advocate Sir James Montgomery. In 1770, Colin MacDonald of Boisdale had begun to pressure his Catholic tenants on the island of South Uist to either convert to the Church of Scotland or vacate his property. So, with the support of the Roman Catholic Church in Scotland, MacDonald gathered a group of 210 settlers, including 110 from the mainland, who departed for St. John's Island in May 1772.

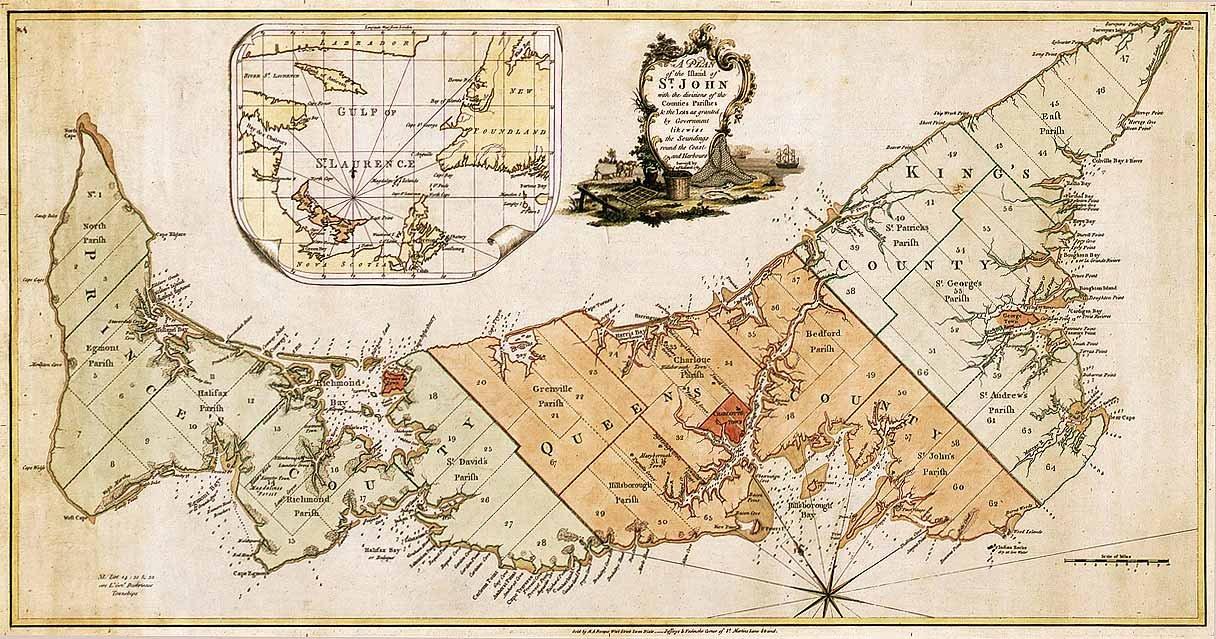
A 1775 map of Prince Edward Island showing Lots 35, 36, and 37 on the far eastern north-shore of Queen's County

MacDonald came to the settlement himself the following year by way of Philadelphia. In 1775, at the start of the American Revolution, he was made a company commander in the 2nd battalion of the Royal Highland Emigrants. His sister Helen took over management of the property on St. John's Island during his absence. In 1781, while MacDonald was still absent, Governor Walter Patterson confiscated some lots which had been in arrears for non-payment of quit-rents. Unaware that the lot which he owned was not affected, MacDonald went to London to protest; he was also upset because he had been interested in purchasing Lot 35. In the end, the Quit Rent Act of 1774 was repealed, the governor was recalled and the lands were returned to their former owners. MacDonald was also able to purchase Lot 35 from General Alexander Maitland.

He was married twice: first to Isabella Gordon of Wardhouse and then, in 1792, to Margaret MacDonald of Ghernish. His son Donald later served in the Legislative Council of Prince Edward Island.

MacDonald died on his estate at Tracadie in 1810.

In 2012, MacDonald was named a Person of National Historic Significance by the Canadian government.
