= Helen MacDonald of Glenaladale =

Scottish-born estate manager

Helen "Nelly" MacDonald of Glenaladale (c. 1750 – c. 1803) was a Scottish-born estate manager in Prince Edward Island, Canada.

The daughter of Alexander M’Donald of Glenaladale, the head of the Glenaladale branch of the Clan Macdonald of Clanranald, and Margaret MacDonell of Scotus, she wrote fluently in both English and Gaelic. Her brother was John MacDonald of Glenaladale. She travelled to St. John's Island (later Prince Edward Island) with her brother Donald and her sister Margaret in 1772. Their family wanted to establish a Scottish Catholic colony based on Lot 36 on the island. In 1775, her brothers John and Donald were recruited to fight on the British side in the American Revolution. MacDonald took on the management of the settlement until the return of her brother John. As a woman and as a Catholic, she was severely hampered in trying to protect her family's interests; at the time, Catholics were not allowed to vote or hold office and women were greatly restricted politically and socially. She was required to operate the family farm, collect rent from tenants and report on the status of the estate.

In 1792, she married Ronald MacDonald of Grand Tracadie.

MacDonald suffered from poor health later in life and died on Prince Edward Island around 1803.
