= Murray Harbour =

- Community
- Rural Municipality of Murray Harbour
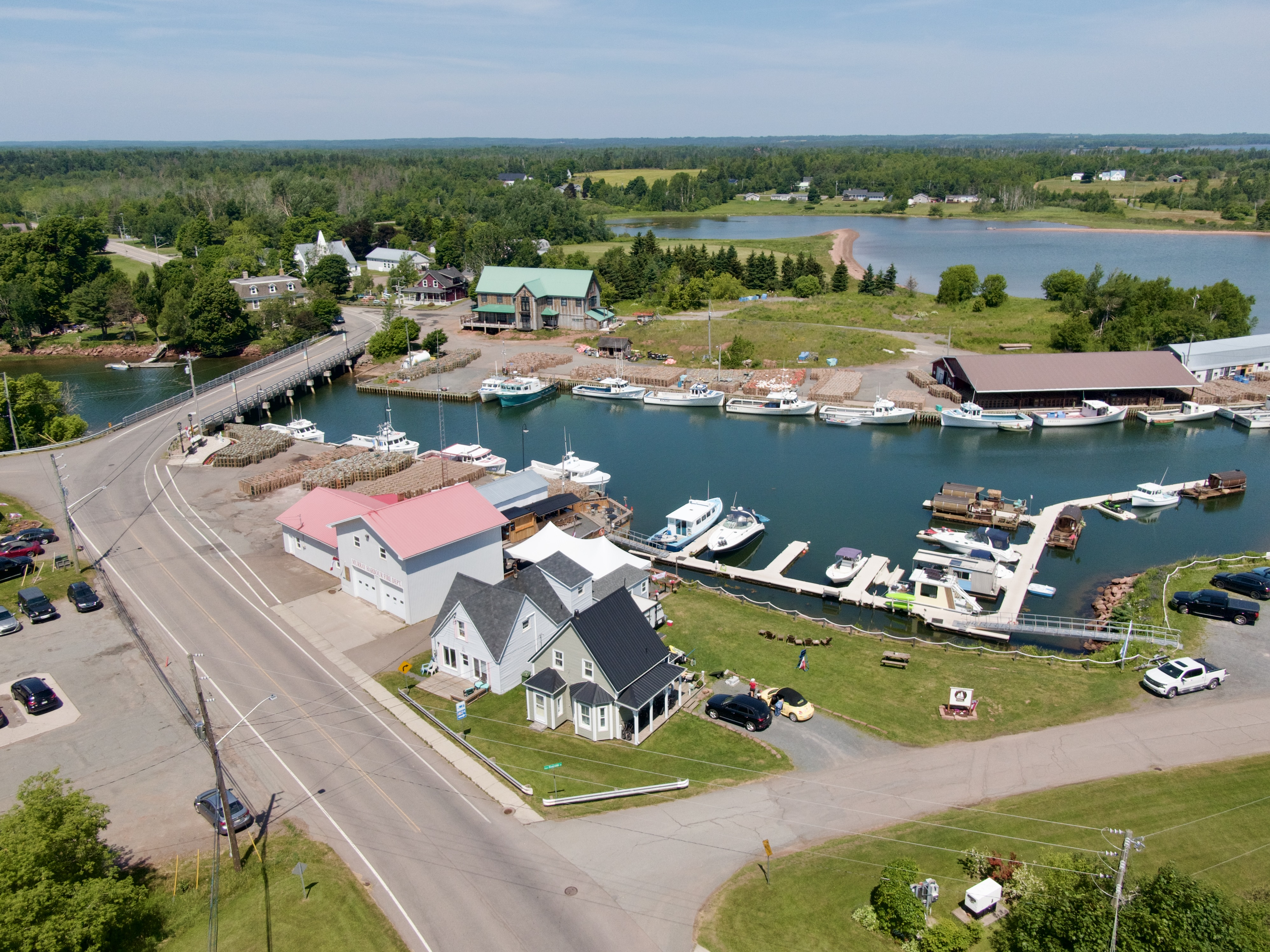

- Seal

- Location of Murray Harbour in Prince Edward Island
- Coordinates: 46°0′24.26″N 62°31′32.14″W
- Country: Canada
- Province: Prince Edward Island
- County: Kings County
- Incorporated (municipality): 1953
- Founded: 1786

Area
  - Land: 3.90 km^{2} (1.51 sq mi)

Population (2021)
  - Total: 282
  - Density: 72.3/km^{2} (187/sq mi)
- Canadian Postal code: C0A1V0
- Area code: 902
- Telephone Exchange: 741 962
- Website: http://www.murrayharbour.ca/

Murray Harbour is a community that holds rural municipality status in Prince Edward Island, Canada. It is located in southeastern Kings County.

Located in the township of Lot 64, the community is named after General the Honourable James Murray, (1721–94), Governor of Quebec (1764–66).

With an area of 3.89 km^{2} and an extensive waterfront facing a large natural harbour (also named Murray Harbour), the community's primary industry is fishing, most notably lobster and scallops. It also hosts some secondary industry in the form of fish processing and a growing tertiary service economy centred on tourism.

The community has a car repair station, a fire station, a grocery, two restaurants, a number of churches, a marina and a number of wharves. The Community Centre hosts many events throughout the year, including plays, music and comedy shows - including Small Halls Festival - ceilidhs, suppers, painting classes, seniors' events and more. Behind the Community Centre is a large double dog park and an outdoor rink/ball hockey rink. In summer 2017 a huge playground (for ages 5 to 13) and a skate park will be added.

The majority of the community's fishing fleet is berthed at the South River Harbour facility which is operated by Fisheries and Oceans Canada. Other wharves include the Murray Harbour wharf, Machon Point wharf, and Beach Point wharf, as well as the Nellie’s Landing.

In recent years, Murray Harbour has attracted many retirees. The climate is a maritime one with only two or three months of cool/cold weather. The summers are pleasant and there is an active arts and social events community.

== History ==
Samuel Holland named Murray Harbour after the Honourable James Murray, (1721–94). According to the first census of Prince Edward Island in 1798, ordered by Governor Fanning, there were only three families resident on Lot 64, Nicolas Hugh, a family of three, William Sencabaugh, a family of five, and a widow, Mrs. Foster with a family of five, United Empire Loyalists. By the beginning of the 18th century, Guernsey's residents were starting to settle in North America. Benjamin Chappell (1740 – 1825) described three notable migrations to Prince Edward Island - the United Empire Loyalists, the Selkirk Settlers, and the Guernsey settlers. He wrote on June 3, 1806, that eight families (the Brehauts, Robertsons, Taudvins, Machons, Marquands, DeJerseys, and Sullivans) who had arrived on a ship from Guernsey on May 16, 1806, had gone to Murray Harbour. The 1901 Census listed 366 heads of households: about 67% were farmers, while another 15% listed their occupation as fishermen. The rest of the people were scattered across many occupations. In the second volume of his 1913 History of the Catholic Church in Prince Edward Island, James MacMillan referred to a "Father Francis" who proselytized "Catholic people living all the way from Rollo Bay to Murray Harbor."

== Demographics ==
Federal census population history of Murray Harbour
Year	Pop.	±%
1956	405	—
1961	407	+0.5%
1966	397	−2.5%
1971	367	−7.6%
1976	419	+14.2%
1981	443	+5.7%
1986	404	−8.8%
1991	390	−3.5%
1996	356	−8.7%
2001	357	+0.3%
2006	358	+0.3%
2011	320	−10.6%
2016	258	−19.4%
2021	282	+9.3%
Source: Statistics Canada

In the 2021 Census of Population conducted by Statistics Canada, Murray Harbour had a population of 282 living in 147 of its 186 total private dwellings, a change of 9.3% from its 2016 population of 258. With a land area of 3.9 km^{2} (1.5 sq mi), it had a population density of 72.3/km^{2} (187.3/sq mi) in 2021.

== Notable people ==
Murray Harbour is the hometown of former ice-hockey player Brad Richards. He received the Lady Byng Memorial Trophy and the Conn Smythe Trophy as a member of the Tampa Bay Lightning when the Lightning won the Stanley Cup in 2004 and he was also the alternate captain of the New York Rangers. He also won the Stanley Cup in 2015 with the Chicago Blackhawks.

It is also the hometown of writer Nicholas Herring.
