= Lot 35, Prince Edward Island =

- Township
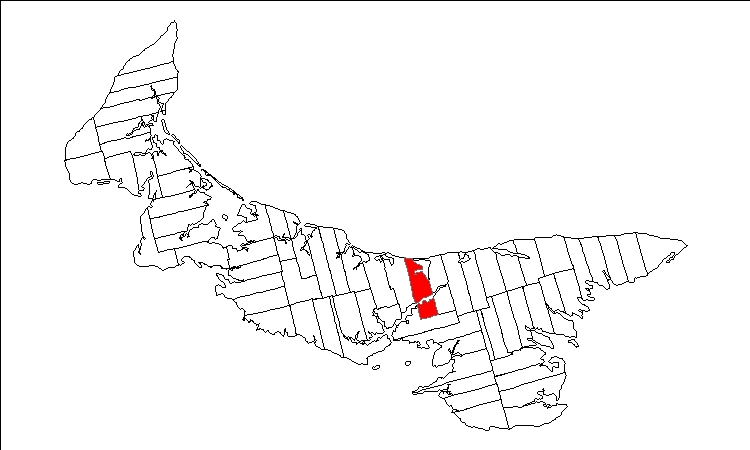
- Map of Prince Edward Island highlighting Lot 35
- Coordinates: 46°19′N 63°00′W
- Country: Canada
- Province: Prince Edward Island
- County: Queens County
- Parish: Bedford Parish

Area
  - Total: 35.57 sq mi (92.12 km^{2})
  - Land: 30.65 sq mi (79.38 km^{2})

Population (2016)
  - Total: 1,642
  - Density: 54/sq mi (20.7/km^{2})
- Canadian Postal code: C0A
- Area code: 902
- NTS Map: 011L06
- GNBC Code: BAERV

Lot 35 is a township in Queens County, Prince Edward Island, Canada. It is part of Bedford Parish. It is split in two by the Hillsborough River. Lot 35 was awarded to Sir Alexander Maitland, 1st Baronet in the 1767 land lottery. It may have been sold to John MacDonald of Glenaladale in 1771, but Maitland was still listed as the proprietor after 1775. John MacDonald brought 210 Catholic Scottish Highlander settlers, 100 from Uist and 110 from mainland Scotland, to the "Tracadie Estate," which was composed of Lots 35 and 36. Lot 35 was sold for arrears in 1781 before being restored in 1791. It was sold in 1792 to John MacDonald of Glenaladale. It was one of the principal areas of Scottish settlement on the island by the census of April 1798. The Tenant League, formed in 1863, was active in Lot 35.

== Demographics ==
Historical population
Year	Pop.	±%
1871	1,080	—
1881	1,116	+3.3%
1891	1,089	−2.4%
1901	1,124	+3.2%
1911	1,016	−9.6%
1921	996	−2.0%
1931	955	−4.1%
1941	928	−2.8%
1951	821	−11.5%
1956	926	+12.8%
1961	926	+0.0%
1966	941	+1.6%
1971	920	−2.2%
1996	1,453	+57.9%
2001	1,536 (Note: adjusted in order to ensure confidentiality)	+5.7%
2006	1,607	+4.6%
2011	1,643	+2.2%
2016	1,642	−0.1%
