= Little Pond, Prince Edward Island =

Community on Prince Edward Island

Little Pond
- Community
- Interactive map of Little Pond
- Coordinates: 46°17′3″N 62°24′39″W
- Country: Canada
- Province: Prince Edward Island
- County: Kings County
- Time zone: UTC−4 (Atlantic Time Zone)
  - Summer (DST): UTC−3 (Atlantic Daylight Time)
- Area code(s): 902, 782

Little Pond is a community in Prince Edward Island, located in Lot 56 of Kings County.
