= Daniel MacDonald =

Daniel MacDonald or McDonald may refer to:

- Daniel J. MacDonald (1918–1980), Canadian politician
- Daniel McDonald (Nova Scotia politician) (1817–1911), lawyer and political figure in Nova Scotia
- Daniel Macdonald (missionary) (1846–1927), missionary and linguist
- Daniel McDonald (actor) (1960–2007), American actor
- Daniel C. MacDonald (1882–?), politician in Prince Edward Island, Canada
- Daniel D. McDonald (1865–?), politician in Manitoba, Canada
- Daniel MacDonald (wrestler) (1908–1979), Canadian Olympic wrestler
- Dan R. MacDonald (1911–1976), composer of fiddle tunes
