= Hartsville =

Hartsville and Hartville can refer to:

== Canada ==
- Hartsville, Prince Edward Island, in the township of Lot 22, Prince Edward Island

== United States ==
- Hartsville, Indiana
- Hartsville, New York
- Hartsville, Pennsylvania
- Hartsville, South Carolina
- North Hartsville, South Carolina
- Hartsville, Tennessee
- Hartville, Missouri
- Hartville, Ohio
- Hartville, Wyoming
