= Charlotte Parish =

Charlotte Parish may refer to:

- Charlotte Parish, Prince Edward Island, Canada
- Charlotte Parish, Saint Vincent and the Grenadines
