= Augustine A. MacDonald =

Canadian politician

Augustine Adolphus MacDonald, OC (February 7, 1876 – January 14, 1970) was a physician and political figure on Prince Edward Island. He represented 1st Kings in the Legislative Assembly of Prince Edward Island as a Conservative from 1915 to 1919 and from 1923 to 1935.

He was born in St. Andrew's, Prince Edward Island, the son of Joseph MacDonald and Catherine MacDonald. MacDonald was educated at Saint Dunstan's College and McGill University. He married Estelle Lachance. MacDonald served as president of the Prince Edward Island Medical Association. He served as speaker for the provincial assembly from 1932 to 1934. He lived in Souris. MacDonald received the Order of Canada in 1968 for providing medical care to the people of rural Prince Edward Island for more than sixty years.
