= Harry Francis =

Harry Francis may refer to:

- Harry S. Francis, Prince Edward Island politician
- Harry Denyer Francis, British Columbia politician
