= North Lake, Prince Edward Island =

North Lake
- Community
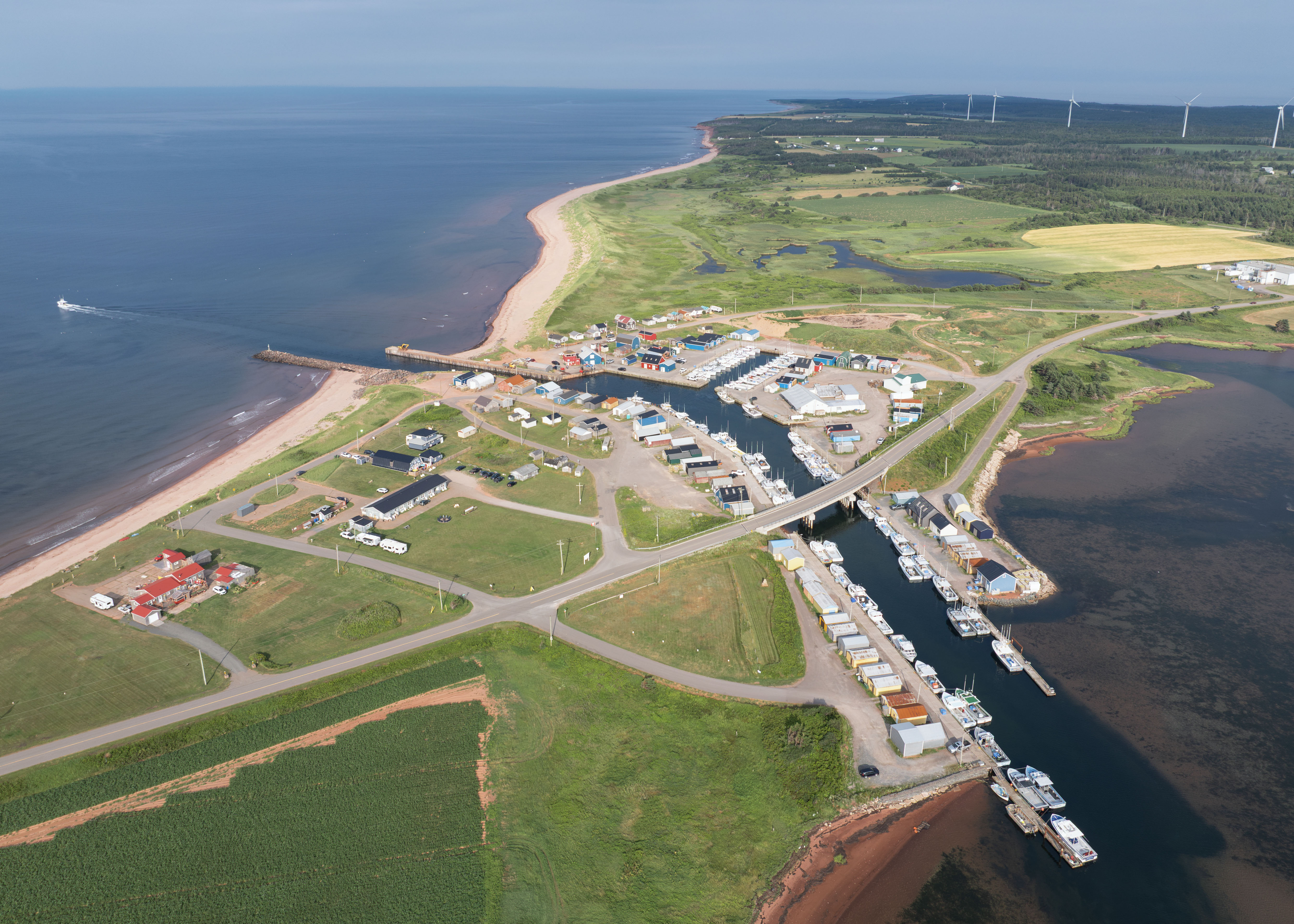

- Location of North Lake in Prince Edward Island
- Coordinates: 46.460941°N 62.064994°W
- Country: Canada
- Province: Prince Edward Island
- County: Kings County
- Lot: Lot 47
- Time zone: UTC−4 (AST)
  - Summer (DST): UTC−3 (ADT)
- Canadian postal code: C0A
- Area code: 902

North Lake is a rural unincorporated community located in Kings County, Prince Edward Island, Canada. It lies within Lot 47 and is situated near the northeastern tip of the island.

Situated on the coast of the Gulf of St. Lawrence, North Lake is built around a traditional fishing harbour. The community relies on the Atlantic fishing industry, particularly in the seasonal fishing of lobster, herring, and mackerel. While the year-round population is small, temporary workers, tourists, and fishing vessels use its limited but functional infrastructure during the summer season.

In 1976, Ken Fraser caught the world's largest Atlantic bluefin tuna off the coast of North Lake.

== See also ==
- List of communities in Prince Edward Island
