= Lot 65, Prince Edward Island =

- Township
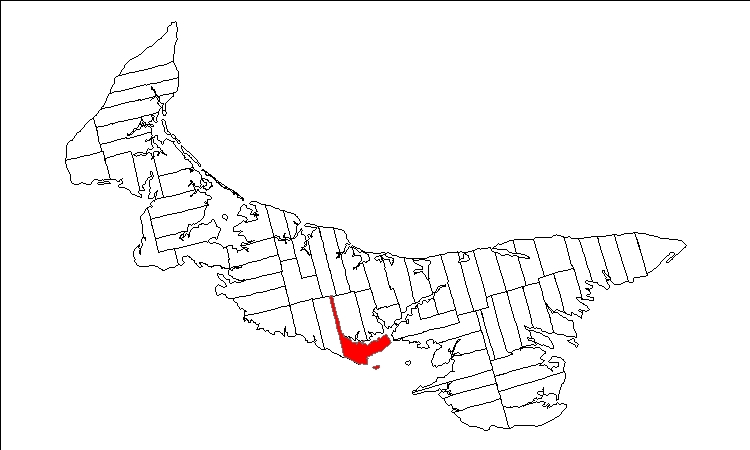
- Map of Prince Edward Island highlighting Lot 65
- Coordinates: 46°10′N 63°15′W
- Country: Canada
- Province: Prince Edward Island
- County: Queens County
- Parish: Hillsboro Parish

Area
  - Total: 32.74 sq mi (84.80 km^{2})

Population (2006)
  - Total: 2,051
  - Density: 63/sq mi (24.2/km^{2})
- Time zone: UTC-4 (AST)
  - Summer (DST): UTC-3 (ADT)
- Canadian Postal code: C0A
- Area code: 902
- NTS Map: 011L03
- GNBC Code: BAESZ

Lot 65 is a township in Queens County, Prince Edward Island, Canada. It is part of Hillsboro Parish. Lot 65 was awarded to Richard Wright and Hugh Owens in the 1767 land lottery. In 1796, then-Lieutenant Governor Edmund Fanning granted Lot 65 to fellow Loyalist Andrew Ladner, with Louisa Augusta Fanning and Peter MacGowan as witnesses. Both Fanning and Ladner were Loyalist immigrants from the newly formed United States. Andrew Ladner died in 1836 and is buried in the township at Nine Mile Creek.
