= Lot 20, Prince Edward Island =

- Township
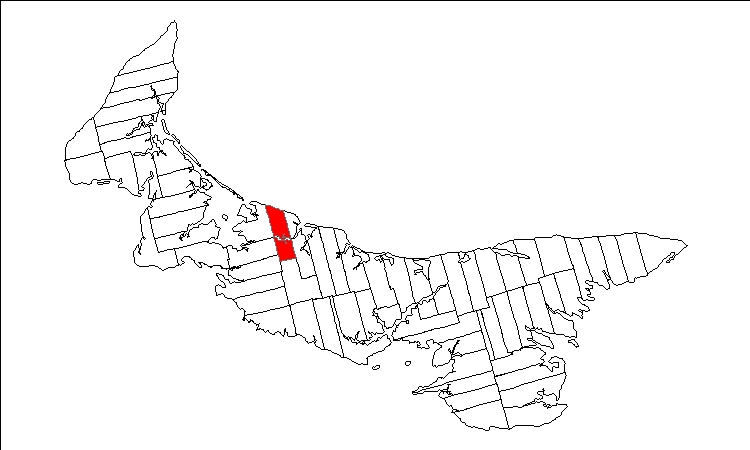
- Map of Prince Edward Island highlighting Lot 20
- Coordinates: 46°29′N 63°35′W
- Country: Canada
- Province: Prince Edward Island
- County: Queens County
- Parish: Greenville Parish

Area
  - Total: 74.08 km^{2} (28.60 sq mi)

Population (2006)
  - Total: 798
  - Density: 10.8/km^{2} (28/sq mi)
- Time zone: UTC-4 (AST)
  - Summer (DST): UTC-3 (ADT)
- Canadian Postal code: C0A
- Area code: 902
- NTS Map: 011L05
- GNBC Code: BAERG

Lot 20 is a township in Queens County, Prince Edward Island, Canada. It is part of Greenville Parish. Lot 20 was awarded to Theodore Houltain and Thomas Basset in the 1767 land lottery.

== Communities ==
Incorporated municipalities:

- Malpeque Bay

Civic address communities:

- Burlington
- Clinton
- French River
- Grahams Road
- Irishtown
- Long River
- Margate
- Norboro
- Park Corner
- Sea View

== Demographics ==
Historical population
Year	Pop.	±%
1871	1,245	—
1881	1,419	+14.0%
1891	1,325	−6.6%
1901	1,231	−7.1%
1911	774	−37.1%
1921	1,042	+34.6%
1931	931	−10.7%
1941	921	−1.1%
2006	798	−13.4%
