= Long River, Prince Edward Island =

Locality in Prince Edward Island

Coordinates: 46.490°N 63.543°W

Location of Long River in Prince Edward Island

Long River is an unincorporated community, in Queens County. Long River is in Lot 20 of Statistics Canada

== Climate ==
Climate data for Long River
Month	Jan	Feb	Mar	Apr	May	Jun	Jul	Aug	Sep	Oct	Nov	Dec	Year
Record high °C (°F)	13.9 (57.0)	13.0 (55.4)	16.7 (62.1)	23.0 (73.4)	32.2 (90.0)	31.0 (87.8)	32.0 (89.6)	33.0 (91.4)	31.5 (88.7)	24.5 (76.1)	22.0 (71.6)	16.0 (60.8)	33.0 (91.4)
Mean daily maximum °C (°F)	−3.6 (25.5)	−2.9 (26.8)	1.0 (33.8)	6.8 (44.2)	14.3 (57.7)	19.4 (66.9)	23.2 (73.8)	23.3 (73.9)	18.7 (65.7)	12.2 (54.0)	5.9 (42.6)	−0.1 (31.8)	9.8 (49.6)
Daily mean °C (°F)	−8.0 (17.6)	−7.4 (18.7)	−2.8 (27.0)	3.0 (37.4)	9.4 (48.9)	14.5 (58.1)	18.4 (65.1)	18.4 (65.1)	14.1 (57.4)	8.2 (46.8)	2.8 (37.0)	−3.6 (25.5)	5.6 (42.1)
Mean daily minimum °C (°F)	−12.3 (9.9)	−11.9 (10.6)	−6.7 (19.9)	−0.8 (30.6)	4.4 (39.9)	9.6 (49.3)	13.5 (56.3)	13.4 (56.1)	9.5 (49.1)	4.2 (39.6)	0.3 (32.5)	−7.1 (19.2)	1.3 (34.3)
Record low °C (°F)	−33.3 (−27.9)	−33.5 (−28.3)	−27.0 (−16.6)	−13.9 (7.0)	−6.7 (19.9)	−1.1 (30.0)	1.7 (35.1)	1.0 (33.8)	−3.0 (26.6)	−8.9 (16.0)	−16.0 (3.2)	−27.2 (−17.0)	−33.5 (−28.3)
Average precipitation mm (inches)	83.6 (3.29)	64.0 (2.52)	69.3 (2.73)	74.6 (2.94)	98.3 (3.87)	91.7 (3.61)	82.1 (3.23)	91.4 (3.60)	100.9 (3.97)	102.5 (4.04)	105.2 (4.14)	92.6 (3.65)	1,056.2 (41.58)
Average rainfall mm (inches)	26.8 (1.06)	22.2 (0.87)	35.3 (1.39)	56.6 (2.23)	95.1 (3.74)	91.7 (3.61)	82.1 (3.23)	91.4 (3.60)	100.9 (3.97)	102.1 (4.02)	90.3 (3.56)	49.5 (1.95)	843.8 (33.22)
Average snowfall cm (inches)	56.9 (22.4)	41.8 (16.5)	34.0 (13.4)	18.0 (7.1)	3.1 (1.2)	0.0 (0.0)	0.0 (0.0)	0.0 (0.0)	0.0 (0.0)	0.4 (0.2)	15.0 (5.9)	43.2 (17.0)	212.3 (83.6)
Source: Environment Canada

== See also ==
- List of communities in Prince Edward Island
