= Alexander D. Robertson =

Canadian politician

Alexander D. Robertson (March 5, 1849 – January 2, 1921) was a farmer, merchant and political figure in Prince Edward Island. He represented 1st Kings in the Legislative Assembly of Prince Edward Island from 1891 to 1897 as a Liberal member.

He was born in West River, East Point, Prince Edward Island, the son of James Robertson and Mary Jarvis, of Scottish descent, and was educated in that district and in Charlottetown. Robertson married Bertha Lydia Fraser in 1887.

He was first elected to the provincial assembly in an 1891 by-election held after John McLean was elected to the House of Commons. Robertson was defeated when he ran for reelection in 1897.
