= Lot 54, Prince Edward Island =

- Township
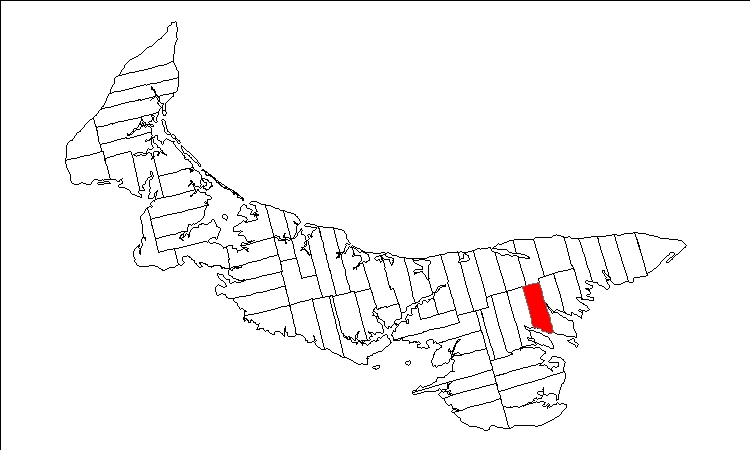
- Map of Prince Edward Island highlighting Lot 54
- Coordinates: 46°16′N 62°34′W
- Country: Canada
- Province: Prince Edward Island
- County: Kings County
- Parish: St. George's Parish

Area
  - Total: 30.17 sq mi (78.15 km^{2})

Population (2006)
  - Total: 435
  - Density: 15/sq mi (5.6/km^{2})
- Time zone: UTC-4 (AST)
  - Summer (DST): UTC-3 (ADT)
- Canadian Postal code: C0A
- Area code: 902
- NTS Map: 011L07
- GNBC Code: BAESO

Lot 54 is a township in Kings County, Prince Edward Island, Canada. It is part of St. George's Parish. In the 1767 land lottery, Lot 54 was awarded to Robert Adair, surgeon to King George III of the United Kingdom.
