= Lot 34, Prince Edward Island =

- Township
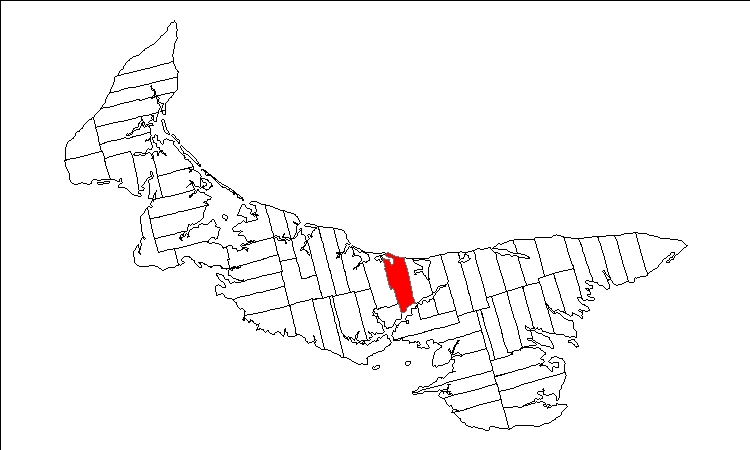
- Map of Prince Edward Island highlighting Lot 34
- Coordinates: 46°21′N 63°5′W
- Country: Canada
- Province: Prince Edward Island
- County: Queens County
- Parish: Charlotte Parish

Area
  - Land: 35.57 sq mi (92.12 km^{2})

Population (2021)
  - Total: 3,248
  - Density: 91/sq mi (35.3/km^{2})
- Time zone: UTC-4 (AST)
  - Summer (DST): UTC-3 (ADT)
- Canadian Postal code: C0A
- Area code: 902
- NTS Map: 011L06
- GNBC Code: BAERU

Lot 34 is a township in Queens County, Prince Edward Island, Canada. It is part of Charlotte Parish. Lot 34 was awarded to John Dickson in the 1767 land lottery while Dickson was the Member of Parliament (MP) for Peeblesshire. Sir James Montgomery, 1st Baronet obtained the land upon Dickson's death. As of the 2006 census, there were 2,355 people living on a land area of 92.12 square kilometres (35.57 sq mi).

== Demographics ==
Historical population
Year	Pop.	±%
1871	1,387	—
1881	1,384	−0.2%
1891	1,317	−4.8%
1901	1,153	−12.5%
1911	1,049	−9.0%
1921	1,019	−2.9%
1931	1,065	+4.5%
1941	1,181	+10.9%
1996	2,180	+84.6%
2001	2,344	+7.5%
2006	2,355	+0.5%
2011	2,577 (Note: adjusted in order to ensure confidentiality)	+9.4%
2016	2,847	+10.5%
2021	3,248 (Note: adjusted in order to ensure confidentiality)	+14.1%
