= Lot 66, Prince Edward Island =

- Township
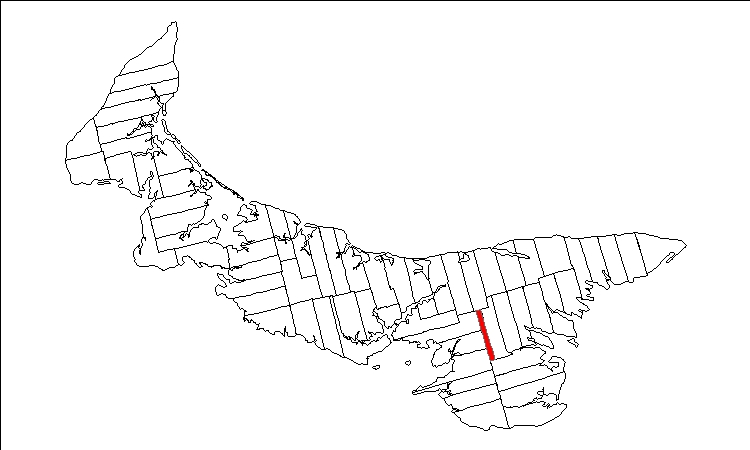
- Map of Prince Edward Island highlighting Lot 66
- Coordinates: 46°12′N 62°45′W
- Country: Canada
- Province: Prince Edward Island
- County: Kings County
- Parish: St. George's Parish

Area
  - Total: 35.07 sq mi (90.83 km^{2})

Population (2006)
  - Total: 847
  - Density: 24/sq mi (9.3/km^{2})
- Time zone: UTC-4 (AST)
  - Summer (DST): UTC-3 (ADT)
- Canadian Postal code: C0A
- Area code: 902
- NTS Map: 011L02
- GNBC Code: BAETA

Lot 66 is a township in Kings County, Prince Edward Island, Canada. It is part of St. George's Parish. Lot 66 was not distributed in the 1767 land lottery, but was reserved as demesne lands of the Crown.
