= Lot 67, Prince Edward Island =

- Township
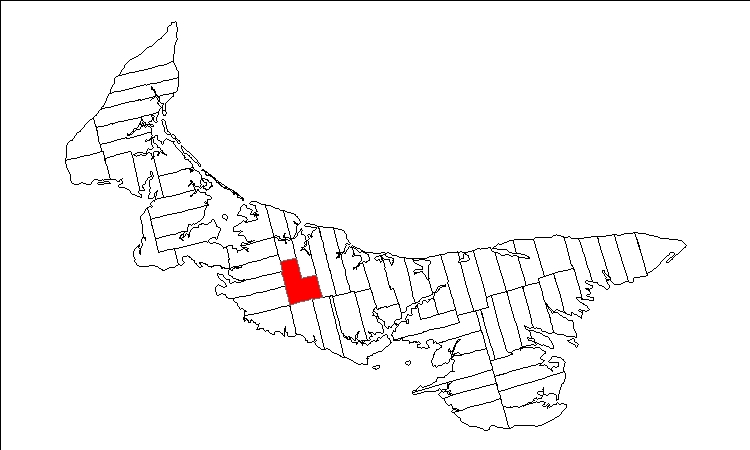
- Map of Prince Edward Island highlighting Lot 67
- Coordinates: 46°20′N 63°30′W
- Country: Canada
- Province: Prince Edward Island
- County: Queens County
- Parish: Greenville Parish

Area
  - Total: 9.19 sq mi (23.81 km^{2})

Population (2006)
  - Total: 172
  - Density: 19/sq mi (7.2/km^{2})
- Time zone: UTC-4 (AST)
  - Summer (DST): UTC-3 (ADT)
- Canadian Postal code: C0A
- Area code: 902
- NTS Map: 011L05
- GNBC Code: BAETB

Lot 67 is a township in Queens County, Prince Edward Island, Canada. It is part of Greenville Parish. Lot 67 was awarded to Robert Moore in the 1767 land lottery; but was sold for arrears of quitrent in 1781.
