= Lot 44, Prince Edward Island =

- Township
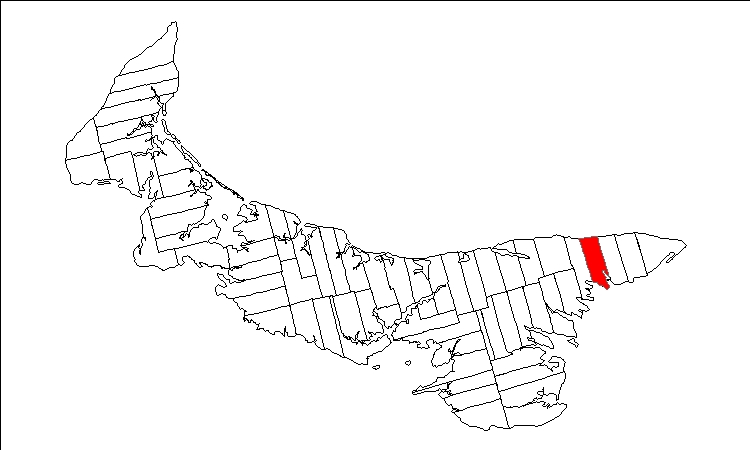
- Map of Prince Edward Island highlighting Lot 44
- Coordinates: 46°24′N 62°20′W
- Country: Canada
- Province: Prince Edward Island
- County: Kings County,
- Parish: East Parish

Area
  - Total: 29.79 sq mi (77.15 km^{2})

Population (2006)
  - Total: 868
  - Density: 29/sq mi (11.3/km^{2})
- Time zone: UTC-4 (AST)
  - Summer (DST): UTC-3 (ADT)
- Canadian Postal code: C0A
- Area code: 902
- NTS Map: 011L08
- GNBC Code: BAESE

Lot 44 is a township in Kings County, Prince Edward Island, Canada. It is part of East Parish. Lot 44 was awarded to merchant Robert Campbell and William Fitzherbert in the 1767 land lottery while Fitzherbert was the Member of Parliament (MP) for Derby.
