= Hillsboro Parish, Prince Edward Island =

Coordinates: 46°10′18.3″N 63°12′25.2″W

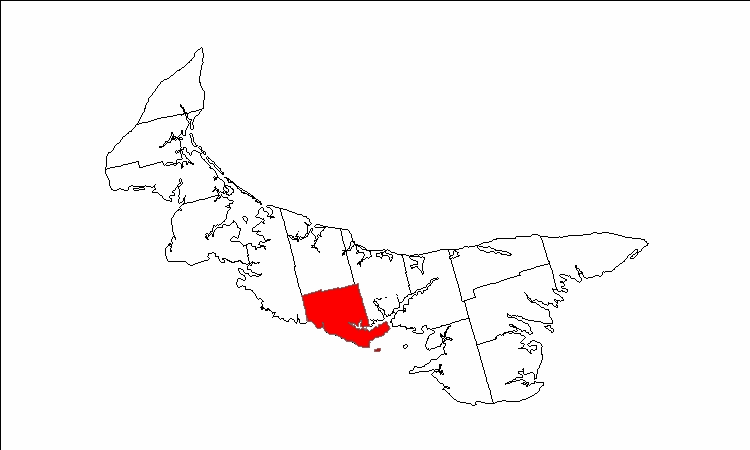

Hillsboro Parish was created as a civil parish in Queens County, Prince Edward Island, Canada, during the 1764–1766 survey of Samuel Holland.

It contains the following townships:

- Lot 29
- Lot 30
- Lot 31
- Lot 65
