= Kings Royalty, Prince Edward Island =

Coordinates: 46°11′54″N 63°32′30″W

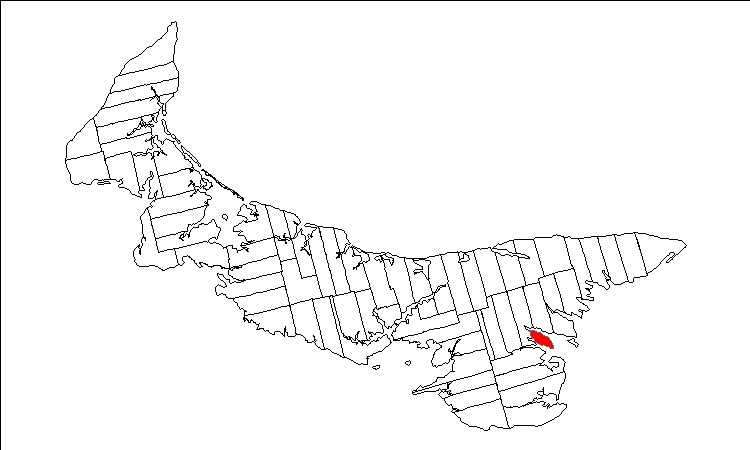

Georgetown Royalty is the royalty for Kings County, Prince Edward Island, Canada.

The township was established as part of the colonial survey of 1764 undertaken by Capt. Samuel J. Holland. It was intended to host the shire town of Kings County, Georgetown. The township is located on a peninsula bounded by the Cardigan River on the north and the Brudenell River on the south.

Originally, Georgetown was unincorporated, therefore the "royalty" and the community were largely synonymous, with many using the term "Georgetown Royalty". Following Georgetown's incorporation, remaining parts of the township became known as North Royalty and Brudenell.

Kings Royalty is part of St. George's Parish.

== See also ==
- Royal eponyms in Canada
