= Lot 31, Prince Edward Island =

- Township
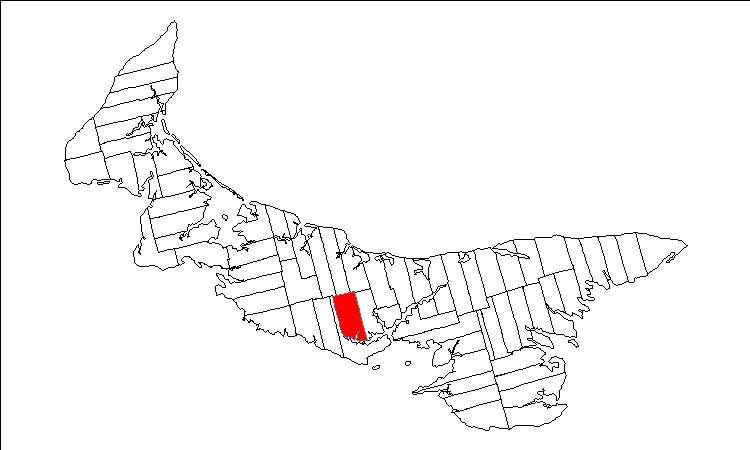
- Map of Prince Edward Island highlighting Lot 31
- Coordinates: 46°15′N 63°17′W
- Country: Canada
- Province: Prince Edward Island
- County: Queens County
- Parish: Hillsboro.

Area
  - Total: 69.10 km^{2} (26.68 sq mi)

Population (2006)
  - Total: 1,616
  - Density: 23.4/km^{2} (61/sq mi)
- Time zone: UTC-4 (AST)
  - Summer (DST): UTC-3 (ADT)
- Canadian Postal code: C0A
- Area code: 902
- NTS Map: 011L03
- GNBC Code: BAERR

Lot 31 is a township in Queens County, Prince Edward Island, Canada. It is part of Hillsboro Parish. Lot 31 was awarded to Adam Drummond in the 1767 land lottery. It was sold to the Earl of Selkirk in 1806.

== Demographics ==
Historical population
Year	Pop.	±%
1871	1,278	—
1881	1,493	+16.8%
1891	1,576	+5.6%
1901	1,434	−9.0%
1911	1,442	+0.6%
1921	1,280	−11.2%
1931	1,262	−1.4%
1941	1,316	+4.3%
2006	1,616	+22.8%
