= Resort municipality =

Type of municipal status in Canada

A resort municipality is a type of municipal status in the Canadian provinces of British Columbia and Prince Edward Island. British Columbia also has a related municipal status type of mountain resort municipality.

There are 14 resort municipalities in British Columbia. In Prince Edward Island, the Resort Municipality of Stanley Bridge, Hope River, Bayview, Cavendish and North Rustico was established as a resort municipality in 1990. The Government of Prince Edward Island's Municipal Government Act prevents the incorporation of any new resort municipalities.

== See also ==
- List of municipalities in British Columbia
- List of municipalities in Prince Edward Island
- List of resort villages in Saskatchewan
- List of summer villages in Alberta
- Mountain resort municipalities:

- Jumbo Glacier, British Columbia
- Sun Peaks, British Columbia

- Municipal government in Canada
- Resort town
