= Lot 32, Prince Edward Island =

- Township
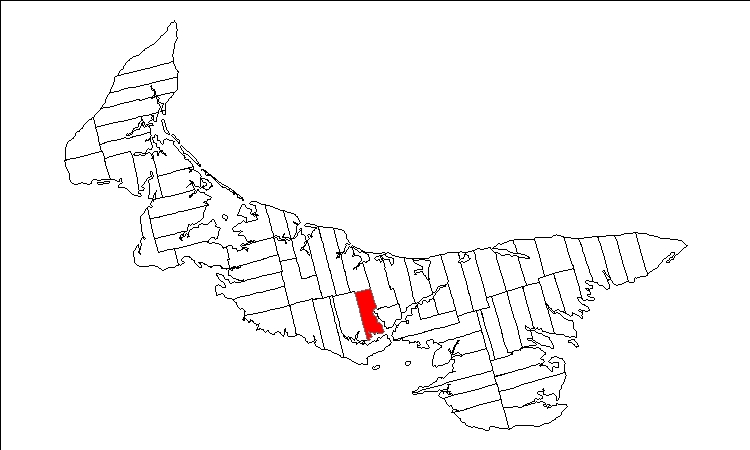
- Map of Prince Edward Island highlighting Lot 32
- Coordinates: 46°16′N 63°14′W
- Country: Canada
- Province: Prince Edward Island
- County: Queens County
- Parish: Charlotte Parish.
- Time zone: UTC-4 (AST)
  - Summer (DST): UTC-3 (ADT)
- Canadian Postal code: C0A
- Area code: 902
- NTS Map: 011L06
- GNBC Code: BAERS

Lot 32 is a township in Queens County, Prince Edward Island, Canada. It is part of Charlotte Parish. Lot 32 was awarded to Sir William Young, 1st Baronet in the 1767 land lottery. It was sold for arrears of quitrent in 1781 and a portion was granted to Loyalists in 1783. Lot 32 is the only township in the province not used by Statistics Canada as a census subdivision.

== Demographics ==
Historical population
Year	Pop.	±%
1871	1,276	—
1881	1,313	+2.9%
1891	1,214	−7.5%
1901	1,059	−12.8%
1911	922	−12.9%
1921	892	−3.3%
1931	845	−5.3%
1941	1,017	+20.4%
