= Lot 63, Prince Edward Island =

- Township
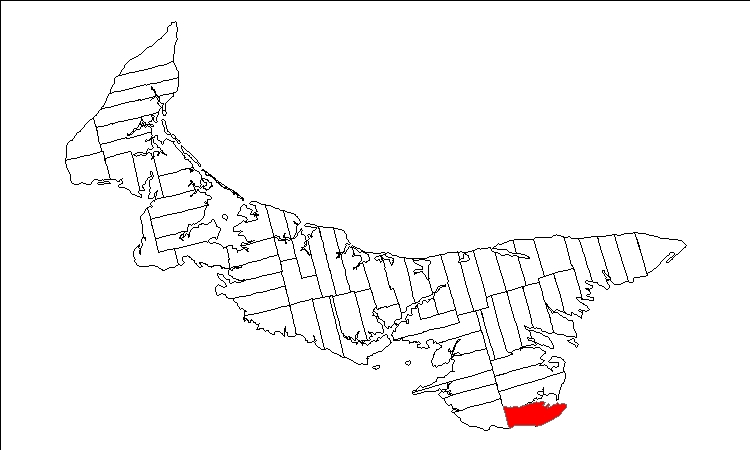
- Map of Prince Edward Island highlighting Lot 63
- Coordinates: 46°3′N 62°35′W
- Country: Canada
- Province: Prince Edward Island
- County: Kings County
- Parish: St. Andrew's Parish

Area
  - Total: 103.01 km^{2} (39.77 sq mi)

Population (2006)
  - Total: 901
  - Density: 8.7/km^{2} (23/sq mi)
- Time zone: UTC-4 (AST)
  - Summer (DST): UTC-3 (ADT)
- Canadian Postal code: C0A
- Area code: 902
- NTS Map: 011L02
- GNBC Code: BAESX

Lot 63 is a township in Kings County, Prince Edward Island, Canada. It is part of St. Andrew's Parish. Lot 63 was awarded to Hugh Palliser in the 1767 land lottery.
