= Grenville Parish, Prince Edward Island =

Coordinates: 46°27′45.4″N 63°29′14.9″W

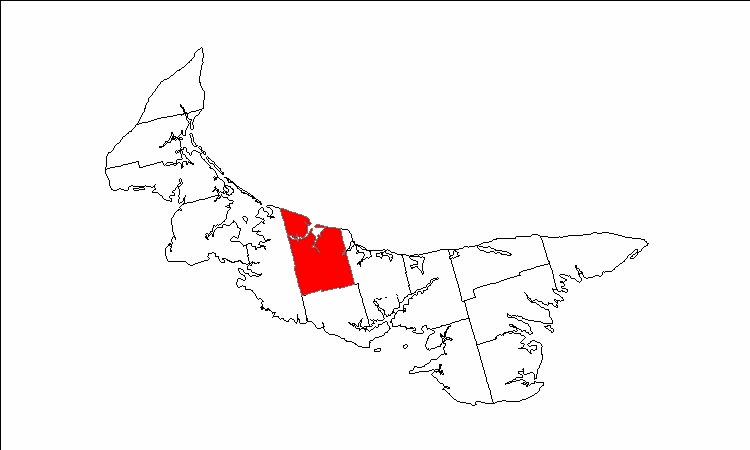

Grenville Parish was created as a civil parish in Queens County, Prince Edward Island, Canada, during the 1764–1766 survey of Samuel Holland.

It contains the following townships:

- Lot 20
- Lot 21
- Lot 22
- Lot 23
- Lot 67

== Naming history ==
This parish was named in honour of George Grenville, Prime Minister of Great Britain from 1763 to 1765 at the time of the survey. Prime Minister Grenville was also honoured with the naming of Grenville Bay in the parish, which has since been renamed New London Bay.

The communities of Granville (North Granville) and South Granville are derived from this name as well. They adopted the present spelling when Granville Leveson-Gower, 2nd Earl Granville gained prominence as the British Secretary of State for the Colonies in 1868–1870.
