= Township (Canada) =

District or area associated with a town in Canada

The term township, in Canada, is generally a district or area associated with a town or other locality. The specific use of the term to describe political subdivisions has varied across the country, usually to describe a local rural or semirural government.

In Eastern Canada, a township is one form of the subdivision of a county. In Quebec, the term is canton in French.

== Maritimes ==
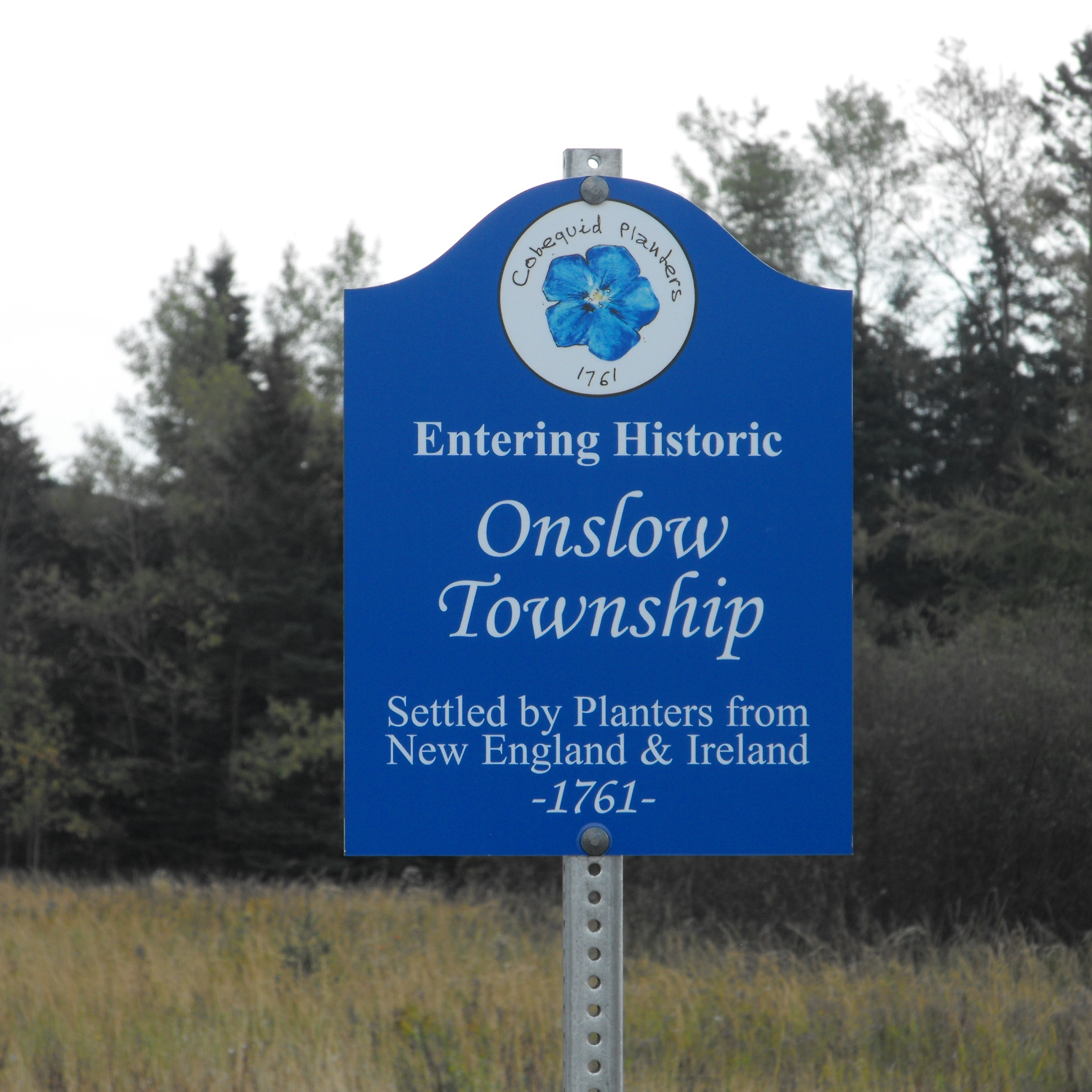
Historical township boundaries are of interest in Atlantic Canada especially by those conducting genealogical research.

The historic colony of Nova Scotia (present-day Nova Scotia, New Brunswick, and Prince Edward Island) used the term township as a subdivision of counties and as a means of attracting settlers to the colony. In Prince Edward Island, the colonial survey of 1764 established 67 townships, known as lots, and 3 royalties, which were grouped into parishes and hence into counties; the townships were geographically and politically the same. In New Brunswick, parishes have taken over as the present-day subdivision of counties, and present-day Nova Scotia uses districts as appropriate.

== Ontario ==
In Ontario, two uses of the term township have evolved.

Geographic townships are the original historical administrative subdivisions surveyed and established, i.e., opened up to colonial settlement, primarily in the 1800s. They are no longer political or administrative entities, but are used as geographic descriptors, such as land descriptions on deeds (i.e., in land registry records), and in land surveying, natural resource exploration and tracking of phenomena such as forest fires or tornados. The location of rural property in particular is often specified by stating its geographic township, plus Concession and Lot number within that township (see land survey systems in Canada).

There are approximately 2500 geographic townships in Ontario.

Township municipalities, also called "political townships", are areas that have been incorporated with municipal governments. They are a lower-tier municipality (if located in a county or regional municipality, e.g., in Southern Ontario) or single-tier municipality (if located in a district, for instance in Northern Ontario).

A township municipality may therefore consist of a portion of one or more geographic townships united as a single entity with a single municipal administration. Often rural counties are subdivided into townships. In some places, usually if the township is in a county rather than in a regional municipality, the head of a political township may be called a "reeve", not a mayor. However, the distinction is changing as many rural townships are replacing the title with "mayor" to reduce confusion. A few townships keep both titles and designate "mayor" as the head of the municipal council and use "reeve" to denote the representative to the upper tier (usually county) council.

The term "geographic township" is also sometimes used in reference to former political townships that were abolished or superseded as part of municipal government restructuring, though technically speaking these may be broader than a single original geographic township as originally surveyed.

== Quebec ==
In Quebec, townships are called cantons in French and can also be political and geographic, similar to Ontario, although the geographic use is no longer current. They were introduced after the British Conquest, primarily as a surveying unit. They were designated and cover most of the then-unattributed territory in Eastern Quebec, in particular what is now known as the Eastern Townships as well as the Outaouais and Saguenay-Lac-Saint-Jean regions.

Townships often served as the territorial basis for new municipalities, but township municipalities are no different from other types such as parish or village municipalities.

== Prairies and BC ==
In the Prairie Provinces and parts of British Columbia, a township is a specific division in the hierarchy of the Dominion Land Survey. Townships are (mostly) 6-by-6-mile (9.7 by 9.7 km) squares, about 36 square miles (93 km^{2}) in area. The townships are not political units (although political boundaries often follow township boundaries) but exist only to define and describe parcels of land relatively simply. Townships are divided into 36 equal 1-by-1-mile (1.6 by 1.6 km) square parcels, known as "sections." In Saskatchewan, a political unit called a rural municipality in general is 3 townships by 3 townships in size, or 18 miles squared, about 324 square miles (840 km^{2}).

Three municipalities in British Columbia, Langley, Esquimalt and Spallumcheen, have "township" in their official names but legally hold the status of district municipalities.

== See also ==
- List of townships in Ontario
- List of townships in Prince Edward Island
- List of townships in Quebec
- List of township municipalities in Quebec
