= Lot 37, Prince Edward Island =

- Township
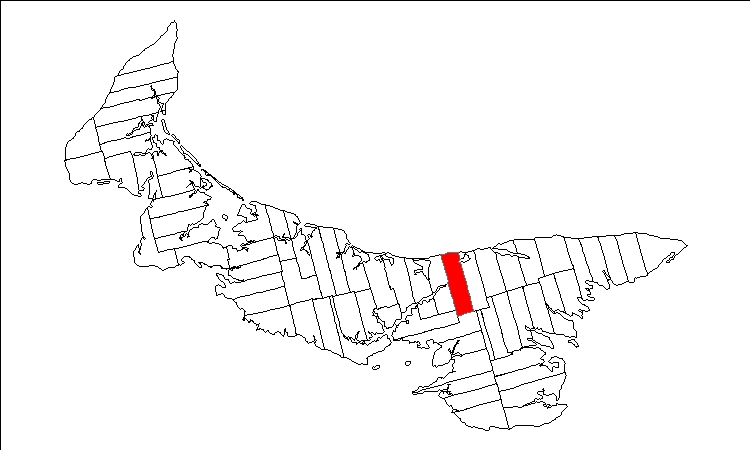
- Map of Prince Edward Island highlighting Lot 37
- Coordinates: 46°21′N 62°52′W
- Country: Canada
- Province: Prince Edward Island
- County: Queens County
- Parish: Bedford Parish

Area
  - Total: 36.03 sq mi (93.32 km^{2})

Population (2006)
  - Total: 544
  - Density: 15/sq mi (5.8/km^{2})
- Canadian Postal code: C0A
- Area code: 902
- NTS Map: 011L07
- GNBC Code: BAERX

Lot 37 is a township in Queens County, Prince Edward Island, Canada. It is part of Bedford Parish. Lot 37 was awarded to William Spry and James Barker in the 1767 land lottery.
