= Daniel C. MacDonald =

Canadian politician

Daniel Charles MacDonald (1882 – after 1927 — in Boston in old age) was a farmer and political figure on Prince Edward Island. He represented 1st Kings in the Legislative Assembly of Prince Edward Island from 1920 to 1923 as a Liberal.

He was born in Greenvale, Lot 46, Prince Edward Island, the son of Ronald MacDonald. He married Sarah MacDonald. MacDonald was defeated when he ran for reelection in 1923. He lived in Greenvale and moved to Massachusetts sometime before 1927. MacDonald died in Boston.
