= Lot 51, Prince Edward Island =

- Township
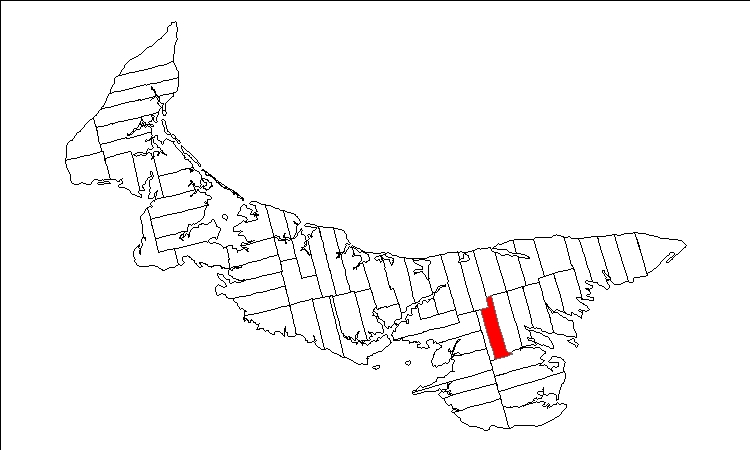
- Map of Prince Edward Island highlighting Lot 51
- Coordinates: 46°13′N 62°43′W
- Country: Canada
- Province: Prince Edward Island
- County: Kings County
- Parish: St. George's Parish

Area
  - Total: 27.79 sq mi (71.98 km^{2})

Population (2006)
  - Total: 792
  - Density: 28/sq mi (11/km^{2})
- Time zone: UTC-4 (AST)
  - Summer (DST): UTC-3 (ADT)
- Canadian Postal code: C0A
- Area code: 902
- NTS Map: 011L02
- GNBC Code: BAESL

Lot 51 is a township in Kings County, Prince Edward Island, Canada. It is part of St. George's Parish. Lot 51 was awarded to John Pringle in the 1767 land lottery.
