= Harry S. Francis =

Canadian politician

Harry S. Francis (June 5, 1886 – June 3, 1948) was a carriage builder and political figure on Prince Edward Island. He represented 1st Kings in the Legislative Assembly of Prince Edward Island from 1944 to 1947 as a Liberal.

He was born in Fortune Bridge, Prince Edward Island, the son of John S. Francis and Jane Elizabeth MacKie, and was educated there. In 1915, he married Ethel M. McEwen. Francis was defeated when he ran for reelection in 1947.
