= Lot 43, Prince Edward Island =

- Township
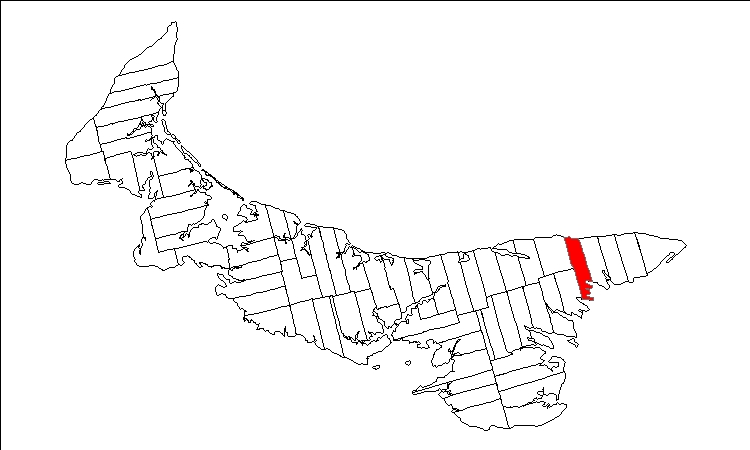
- Map of Prince Edward Island highlighting Lot 43
- Coordinates: 46°23′N 62°24′W
- Country: Canada
- Province: Prince Edward Island
- County: Kings County,
- Parish: East Parish

Area
  - Total: 28.10 sq mi (72.78 km^{2})

Population (2006)
  - Total: 777
  - Density: 28/sq mi (10.7/km^{2})
- Time zone: UTC-4 (AST)
  - Summer (DST): UTC-3 (ADT)
- Canadian Postal code: C0A
- Area code: 902
- NTS Map: 011L08
- GNBC Code: BAESD

Lot 43 is a township in Kings County, Prince Edward Island, Canada. It is part of East Parish. Lot 43 was awarded to George Brydges Rodney, 1st Baron Rodney in the 1767 land lottery.

== Communities ==
- Fortune Bridge
