= Lot 53, Prince Edward Island =

- Township
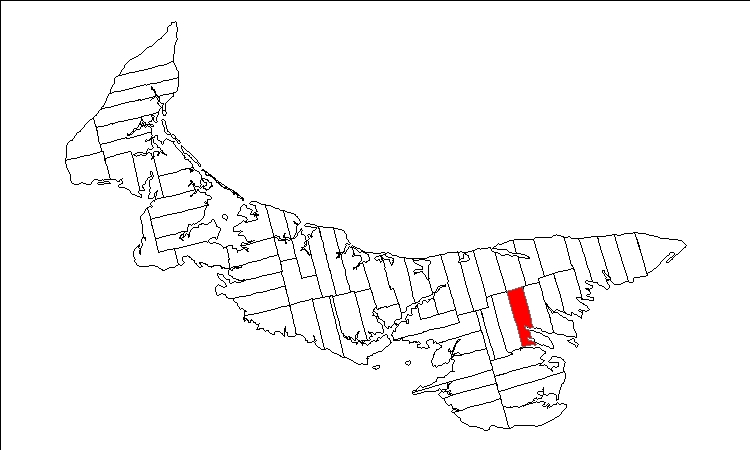
- Map of Prince Edward Island highlighting Lot 53
- Coordinates: 46°15′N 62°36′W
- Country: Canada
- Province: Prince Edward Island
- County: Kings County
- Parish: St. George's Parish

Area
  - Total: 27.54 sq mi (71.33 km^{2})

Population (2006)
  - Total: 439
  - Density: 16/sq mi (6.2/km^{2})
- Time zone: UTC-4 (AST)
  - Summer (DST): UTC-3 (ADT)
- Canadian Postal code: C0A
- Area code: 902
- NTS Map: 011L02
- GNBC Code: BAESN

Lot 53 is a township in Kings County, Prince Edward Island, Canada. It is part of St. George's Parish. Lot 53 was awarded to merchant John Williams, Lieutenant George Campbell, and doctor Richard Huck in the 1767 land lottery. By 1806 the western third was owned by the Earl of Selkirk.
