= Lot 64, Prince Edward Island =

- Township
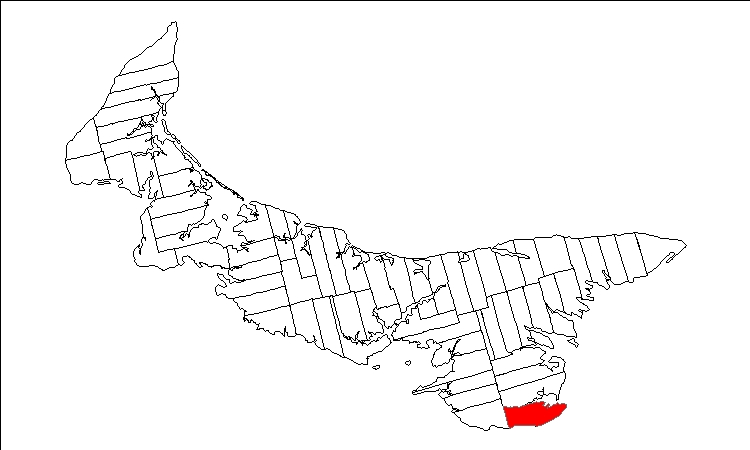
- Map of Prince Edward Island highlighting Lot 64
- Coordinates: 45°59′N 62°35′W
- Country: Canada
- Province: Prince Edward Island
- County: Kings County
- Parish: St. Andrew's Parish

Area
  - Total: 82.06 km^{2} (31.68 sq mi)

Population (2006)
  - Total: 931
  - Density: 11.3/km^{2} (29/sq mi)
- Time zone: UTC-4 (AST)
  - Summer (DST): UTC-3 (ADT)
- Canadian Postal code: C0A
- Area code: 902
- NTS Map: 011E15
- GNBC Code: BAESY

Lot 64 is a township in Kings County, Prince Edward Island, Canada. It is part of St. Andrew's Parish. There were only three settler families in the Murray Harbour area in the 1798 census, who were Loyalists, and they were followed by a notable migration of early settlers from Guernsey in 1806.

Lot 64 was awarded to Colonel Richard Maitland in the 1767 land lottery. By 1797, it had been sold to John Cambridge and Co., the largest landowner on the island. John Cambridge was not only the landlord, but also operated a sawmill, a gristmill, a shipbuilding yard, and the first store in the area.

John Cambridge's shipbuilding and land empire, (nearly 10% of Prince Edward Island), was built on debt; after his death the land was acquired in 1841 by Samuel Cunard, the Halifax shipping magnate. Cunard's heirs sold his landholdings to the provincial government in 1866, one year after his death.

The provincial system of land tenure was reformed by the federally funded Land Purchase Act (1875), where proprietors of more than 200 acres were forced to sell to the provincial government, who in turn resold the land to the tenants.
