= Fortune Bridge, Prince Edward Island =

Human settlement in Prince Edward Island, Canada

Coordinates: 46°21′00″N 62°23′00″W

Location of Fortune Bridge in Prince Edward Island

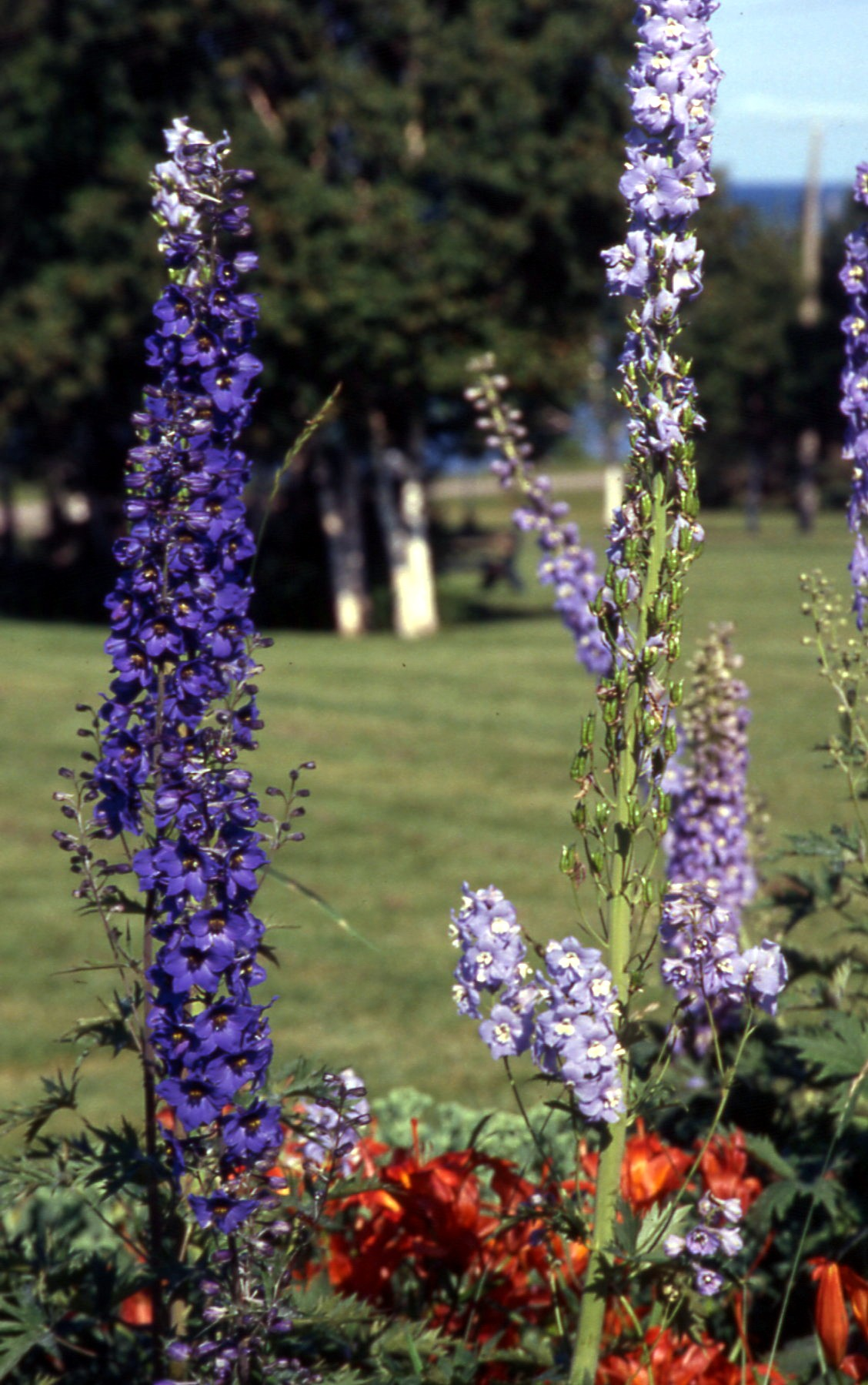
Flowers in Fortune Bridge

Fortune Bridge is a small unincorporated area on Lot 43, East Parish, King County, Prince Edward Island, Canada. It is located west of the Town of Souris.

Author Elmer Blaney Harris built a summer home and founded an artist colony in Fortune Bridge. Local residents, including Lydia Dingwell (1852-1931) of nearby Dingwells Mills, would be the inspiration for his play Johnny Belinda. The home was later owned by actress Colleen Dewhurst and is now The Inn at Bay Fortune and Fireworks restaurant, owned and operated by Chef Michael Smith and his partner Chastity Smith.

== Postal information ==
Fortune Bridge had its own post office from 1889 to 1914. The postal code for Fortune Bridge is C0A 2B0 and the following are rural route addresses for the community: Souris Rural Route 4.

== Fortune Bridge Today ==
Fortune Bridge is known for tourism, farming, and fishing. Fortune Bridge is home to the Fortune River and "Front Beach". Many cottages are located in the area due to its scenic vistas. During the summer months, the Fortune River is a popular destination for boaters and paddlers of all skill levels, due to it being calm and sheltered. Fortune Bridge is also home to the Fortune Community Centre, serving the local area since 1928.
