= Lot 61, Prince Edward Island =

- Township
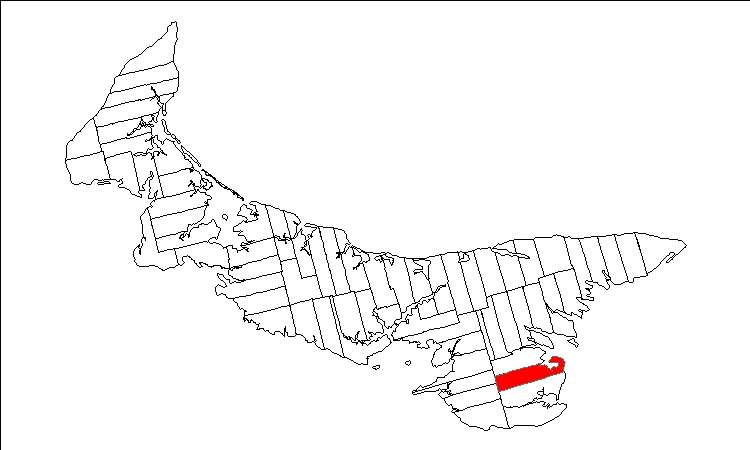
- Map of Prince Edward Island highlighting Lot 61
- Coordinates: 46°06′N 62°36′W
- Country: Canada
- Province: Prince Edward Island
- County: Kings County
- Parish: St. Andrew's Parish

Area
  - Total: 85.26 km^{2} (32.92 sq mi)
- Elevation: 0–50 m (0–164 ft)

Population (2006)
  - Total: 832
  - Density: 9.8/km^{2} (25/sq mi)
- Time zone: UTC-4 (AST)
  - Summer (DST): UTC-3 (ADT)
- Canadian Postal code: C0A
- Area code: 902
- NTS Map: 011L02
- GNBC Code: BAESV

Lot 61 is a township in Kings County, Prince Edward Island, Canada. It is part of St. Andrew's Parish. Lot 61 was awarded to Richard Cumberland in the 1767 land lottery. It was sold to Laurence Sullivan in 1783.
