= Lot 55, Prince Edward Island =

- Township
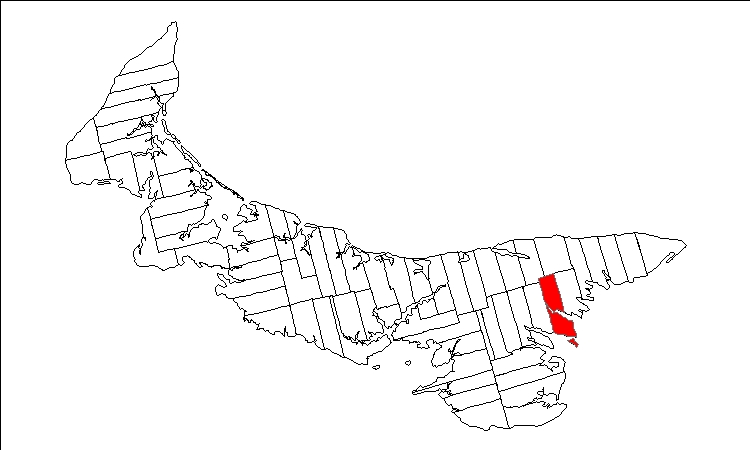
- Map of Prince Edward Island highlighting Lot 55
- Coordinates: 46°18′N 62°30′W
- Country: Canada
- Province: Prince Edward Island
- County: Kings County
- Parish: St. George's Parish

Area
  - Total: 33.42 sq mi (86.57 km^{2})

Population (2006)
  - Total: 397
  - Density: 12/sq mi (4.6/km^{2})
- Time zone: UTC-4 (AST)
  - Summer (DST): UTC-3 (ADT)
- Canadian Postal code: C0A
- Area code: 902
- NTS Map: 011L07
- GNBC Code: BAESP

Lot 55 is a township in Kings County, Prince Edward Island, Canada. It is part of St. George's Parish. Lot 55 was awarded to Hugh Finlay and Francis and Samuel McKay in the 1767 land lottery.
