= St. George's Parish, Prince Edward Island =

Coordinates: 46°14′31.9″N 62°36′21.1″W

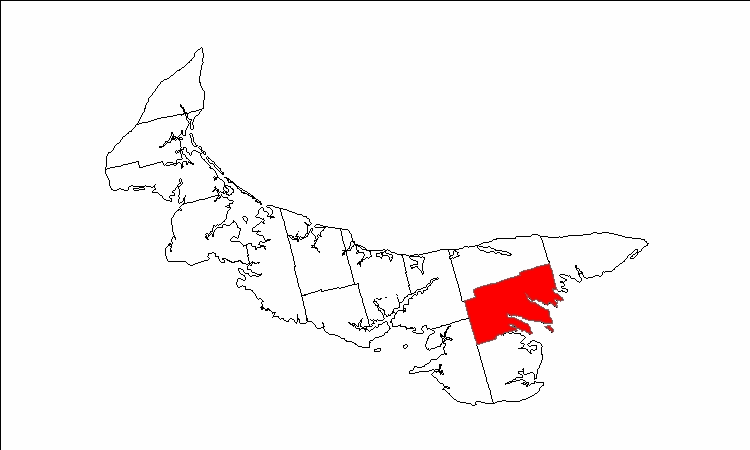

St. George's Parish was created as a civil parish in Kings County, Prince Edward Island, Canada, during the 1764–1766 survey of Samuel Holland.

It contains the following townships:

- Lot 51
- Lot 52
- Lot 53
- Lot 54
- Lot 55
- Lot 56
- Lot 66

It also contains Kings Royalty.
