= Lot 59, Prince Edward Island =

- Township
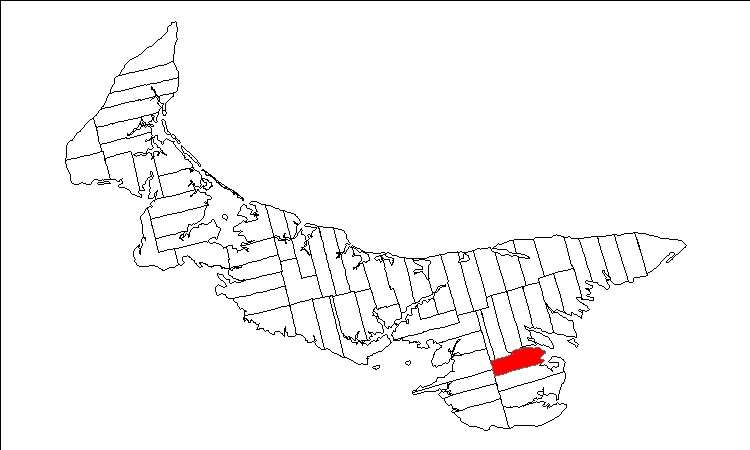
- Map of Prince Edward Island highlighting Lot 59
- Coordinates: 46°8′N 62°38′W
- Country: Canada
- Province: Prince Edward Island
- County: Kings County
- Parish: St. Andrew's Parish

Area
  - Total: 30.40 sq mi (78.73 km^{2})

Population (2006)
  - Total: 1,285
  - Density: 42/sq mi (16.3/km^{2})
- Time zone: UTC-4 (AST)
  - Summer (DST): UTC-3 (ADT)
- Canadian Postal code: C0A
- Area code: 902
- NTS Map: 011L07
- GNBC Code: BAEST

Lot 59 is a township in Kings County, Prince Edward Island, Canada. It is part of St. Andrew's Parish. Lot 59 was awarded to merchants Hutchison Mure, Robert Cathcart, and David Higgins in the 1767 land lottery.

== Communities ==
Incorporated

- Lower Montague
- Montague
- Valleyfield

Unincorporated

- Albion
- Commercial Cross
- Heatherdale
- Kilmuir
- Whim Road
