= Lot 45, Prince Edward Island =

- Township
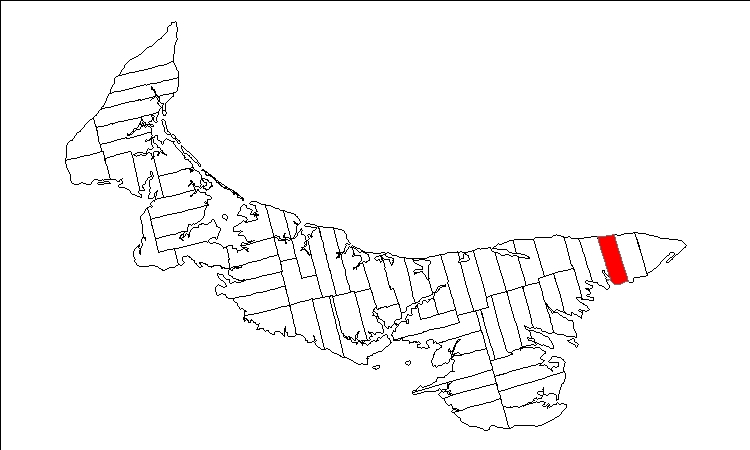
- Map of Prince Edward Island highlighting Lot 45
- Coordinates: 46°24′N 62°15′W
- Country: Canada
- Province: Prince Edward Island
- County: Kings County,
- Parish: East Parish

Area
  - Total: 27.03 sq mi (70.01 km^{2})

Population (2006)
  - Total: 498
  - Density: 18/sq mi (7.1/km^{2})
- Time zone: UTC-4 (AST)
  - Summer (DST): UTC-3 (ADT)
- Canadian Postal code: C0A
- Area code: 902
- NTS Map: 011L08
- GNBC Code: BAESF

Lot 45 is a township in Kings County, Prince Edward Island, Canada. It is part of East Parish. Lot 45 was awarded to William Matthew Burt MP and John Callender in the 1767 land lottery.

== Communities ==
Unincorporated Communities:

- Big Pond
- Chepstow
- Hermanville
- New Harmony
