= Bedford Parish, Prince Edward Island =

Coordinates: 46°20′42″N 63°4′36.2″W

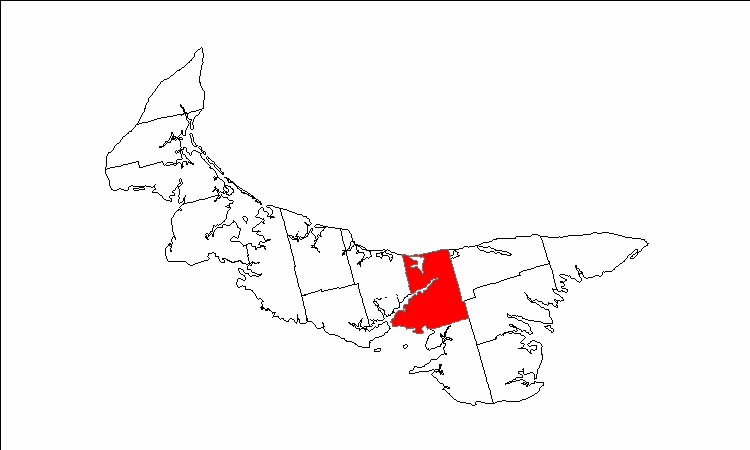

Bedford Parish was created as a civil parish in Queens County, Prince Edward Island, Canada, during the 1764–1766 survey of Samuel Holland.

It contains the following townships:

- Lot 35
- Lot 36
- Lot 37
- Lot 48
- Lot 49
