= H. Daniel McLean =

Canadian politician

Harry Daniel McLean (August 14, 1877 – October 27, 1962) was a merchant and political figure on Prince Edward Island. He represented 1st Kings in the Legislative Assembly of Prince Edward Island from 1916 to 1935 as a Conservative.

He was born in Souris, Prince Edward Island, the son of John McLean and Matilda Jane Jury, and was educated at Prince of Wales College. In 1902, he married Annie Mitchell. He was first elected to the provincial assembly in a 1916 by-election held after his father was named to the Canadian senate. McLean served in the province's Executive Council as minister without portfolio. He was defeated when he ran for reelection in 1935. McLean died at a nursing home in Charlottetown at the age of 85.

His son John Robert also served in the provincial assembly.
