= Charlotte Parish, Prince Edward Island =

Civil parish in Prince Edward Island, Canada

Coordinates: 46°21′18.7″N 63°10′9.5″W

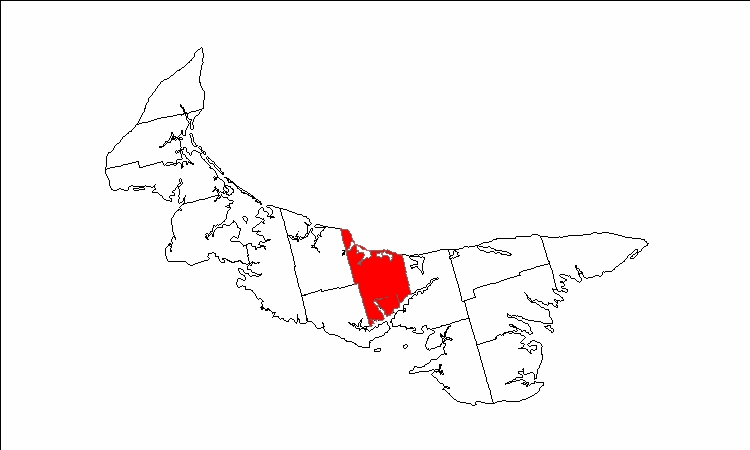

Charlotte Parish was created as a civil parish in Queens County, Prince Edward Island, Canada, during the 1764–1766 survey of Samuel Holland.

It contains the following townships:

- Lot 24
- Lot 32
- Lot 33
- Lot 34

It also contains Queens Royalty.
