= St. Andrew's Parish, Prince Edward Island =

Coordinates: 46°0′27.7″N 62°35′47.8″W

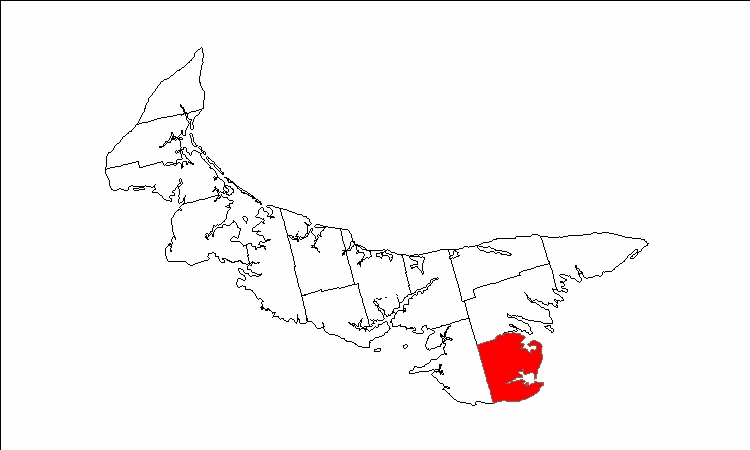

St. Andrew's Parish was created as a civil parish in Kings County, Prince Edward Island, Canada, during the 1764–1766 survey of Samuel Holland.

It contains the following townships:

- Lot 59
- Lot 61
- Lot 63
- Lot 64
