= Lot 49, Prince Edward Island =

- Township
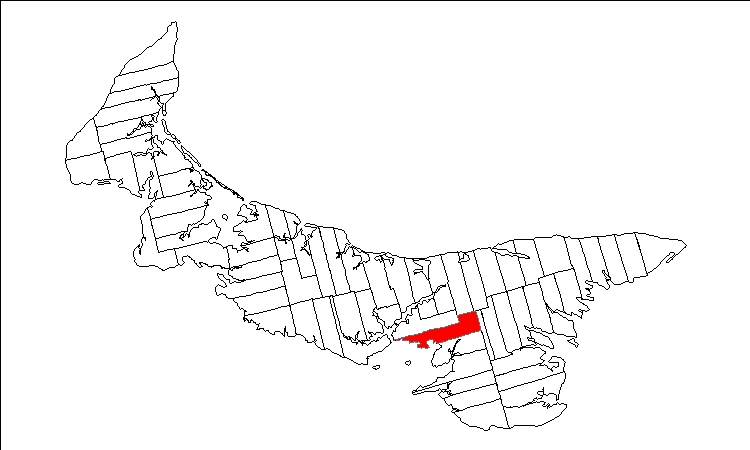
- Map of Prince Edward Island highlighting Lot 49
- Coordinates: 46°13′N 62°57′W
- Country: Canada
- Province: Prince Edward Island
- County: Queens County,
- Parish: Bedford Parish

Area
  - Total: 36.82 sq mi (95.37 km^{2})

Population (2006)
  - Total: 1,043
  - Density: 28/sq mi (10.9/km^{2})
- Time zone: UTC-4 (AST)
  - Summer (DST): UTC-3 (ADT)
- Canadian Postal code: C0A
- Area code: 902
- NTS Map: 011L02
- GNBC Code: BAESJ

Lot 49 is a township in Queens County, Prince Edward Island, Canada. It is part of Bedford Parish. Lot 49 was awarded to Gabriel Christie and James Stephenson in the 1767 land lottery, and was sold to merchant Robert Clark in 1775.
