= Lot 46, Prince Edward Island =

- Township
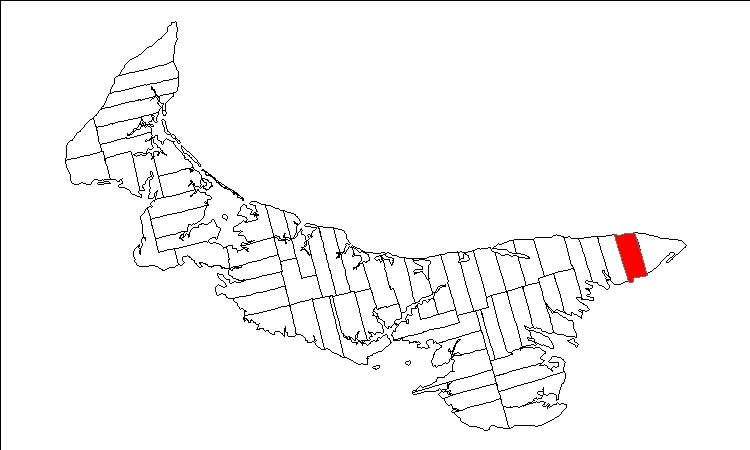
- Map of Prince Edward Island highlighting Lot 46
- Coordinates: 46°25′N 62°11′W
- Country: Canada
- Province: Prince Edward Island
- County: Kings County,
- Parish: East Parish

Area
  - Total: 32.35 sq mi (83.79 km^{2})

Population (2006)
  - Total: 400
  - Density: 12/sq mi (4.8/km^{2})
- Time zone: UTC-4 (AST)
  - Summer (DST): UTC-3 (ADT)
- Canadian Postal code: C0A
- Area code: 902
- NTS Map: 011L08
- GNBC Code: BAESG

Lot 46 is a township in Kings County, Prince Edward Island, Canada. It is part of East Parish. Lot 46 was awarded to Alexander Fordyce and Robert Gordon in the 1767 land lottery.
