= Lot 22, Prince Edward Island =

- Township
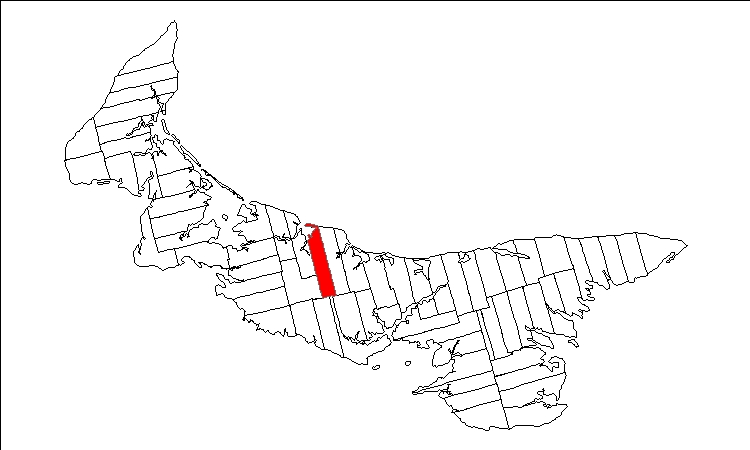
- Map of Prince Edward Island highlighting Lot 22
- Coordinates: 46°23′N 63°24′W
- Country: Canada
- Province: Prince Edward Island
- County: Queens County
- Parish: Greenville Parish

Area
  - Total: 71.03 km^{2} (27.42 sq mi)

Population (2006)
  - Total: 579
  - Density: 8.02/km^{2} (20.8/sq mi)
- Time zone: UTC-4 (AST)
  - Summer (DST): UTC-3 (ADT)
- Canadian Postal code: C0B
- Area code: 902
- NTS Map: 011L06
- GNBC Code: BAERI

Lot 22 is a township in Queens County, Prince Edward Island, Canada. It is part of Greenville Parish. Lot 22 was awarded to John Gordon and William Ridge in the 1767 land lottery.

== Communities ==
Incorporated municipalities:

- Darlington
- Hunter River
- Stanley Bridge, Hope River, Bayview, Cavendish and North Rustico

Civic address communities:

- Bayview
- Cavendish
- Darlington
- Fredericton
- Hartsville
- Hazel Grove
- Hope River
- Hunter River
- Millvale
- Rennies Road
- Springton
- St. Ann
- St. Patricks
- Stanley Bridge
- Toronto

== Demographics ==
Historical population
Year	Pop.	±%
1871	1,411	—
1881	1,556	+10.3%
1891	1,466	−5.8%
1901	1,226	−16.4%
1911	948	−22.7%
1921	844	−11.0%
1931	810	−4.0%
1941	776	−4.2%
2006	579	−25.4%
