= Lot 56, Prince Edward Island =

- Township
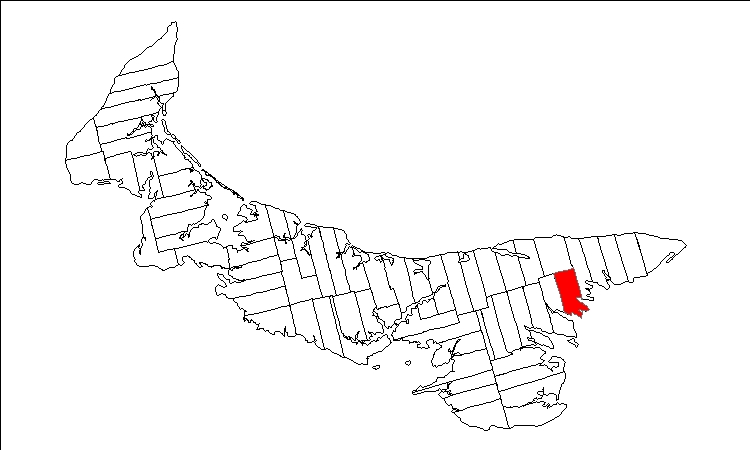
- Map of Prince Edward Island highlighting Lot 56
- Coordinates: 46°20′N 62°25′W
- Country: Canada
- Province: Prince Edward Island
- County: Kings County
- Parish: St. George's Parish

Area
  - Total: 31.31 sq mi (81.10 km^{2})

Population (2006)
  - Total: 447
  - Density: 14/sq mi (5.5/km^{2})
- Time zone: UTC-4 (AST)
  - Summer (DST): UTC-3 (ADT)
- Canadian Postal code: C0A
- Area code: 902
- NTS Map: 011L08
- GNBC Code: BAESQ

Lot 56 is a township in Kings County, Prince Edward Island, Canada. It is part of St. George's Parish. Lot 56 was awarded to George Townshend, 1st Marquess Townshend in the 1767 Lottery. General Townshend had assumed command of the British forces after General James Wolfe fell at the Battle of the Plains of Abraham during the Seven Years' War. Townshend later became Lord Lieutenant of Ireland. One quarter of the lot was granted to Loyalists in 1783.
