= East Parish, Prince Edward Island =

Coordinates: 46°26′1.5″N 62°7′31.4″W

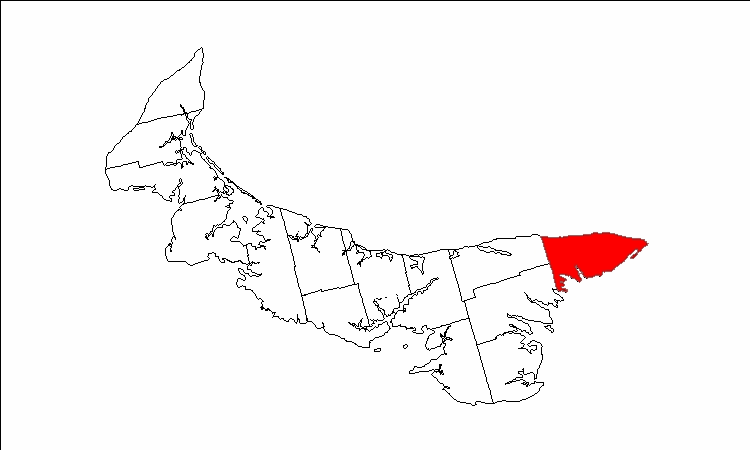

East Parish was created as a civil parish in Kings County, Prince Edward Island, Canada, during the 1764–1766 survey of Samuel Holland.

It contains the following townships:

- Lot 43
- Lot 44
- Lot 45
- Lot 46
- Lot 47
