= Lot 36, Prince Edward Island =

Coordinates: 46.2667°N 62.9°W

- Township
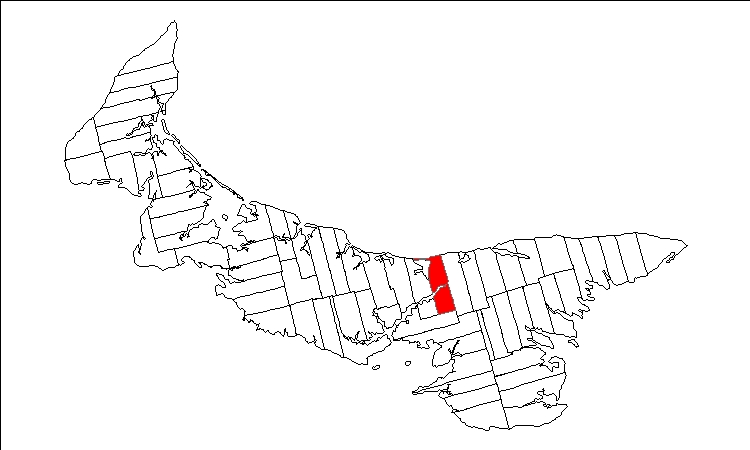
- Map of Prince Edward Island highlighting Lot 36
- Country: Canada
- Province: Prince Edward Island
- County: Queens County
- Parish: Bedford Parish

Area
  - Total: 32.83 sq mi (85.04 km^{2})

Population (2006)
  - Total: 761
  - Density: 23/sq mi (8.9/km^{2})
- Canadian Postal code: C0A
- Area code: 902
- NTS Map: 011L07
- GNBC Code: BAERW

Lot 36 is a township in Queens County, Prince Edward Island, Canada. It is part of Bedford Parish. Lot 36 was awarded to merchants George Spence and John Mill in the 1767 land lottery. It was sold to Donald MacDonald in 1775.
