= Kings County, Prince Edward Island =

County in Prince Edward Island, Canada

Coordinates: 46°15′N 62°30′W

Kings County
- County
- Location of Kings County in Prince Edward Island
- Incorporated Towns & Municipalities: Three Rivers (town), Souris (town)
- Parishes: St. Patrick's Parish, East Parish, St. George's Parish, St. Andrew's Parish
- Townships and royalties: List: Kings Royalty, Lot 38, Lot 39, Lot 40, Lot 41, Lot 42, Lot 43, Lot 44, Lot 45, Lot 46, Lot 47, Lot 51, Lot 52, Lot 53, Lot 54, Lot 55, Lot 56, Lot 59, Lot 61, Lot 63, Lot 64, Lot 66

Area
  - Total: 1,686.34 km^{2} (651.10 sq mi)

Population (2021)
  - Total: 18,327
  - Density: 10.868/km^{2} (28.148/sq mi)
- Average Earnings per capita (2015): $35,947

Kings County (2021 population 18,327) is located in eastern Prince Edward Island, Canada.

It is the province's smallest, most rural and least-populated county. Kings County is also least dependent upon the agriculture industry compared with the other two counties, while being more heavily dependent on the fishery and forest industry. Comparatively large parts of the county are still forested and it hosts the province's largest sawmill. The only heavy industry, aside from forestry and industrial farming, is a small shipyard, although secondary manufacturing has been established in recent years.

The county was named by Capt. Samuel Holland in 1765 for King George III (1738–1820). As such, Kings County's shire town is Georgetown. The largest community in the county, also within the town of Three Rivers, is Montague.

== Demographics ==
Historical populations
Year	Pop.	±%
1991	19,328	—
1996	19,561	+1.2%
2001	19,180	−1.9%
2006	18,608	−3.0%
2011	17,990	−3.3%
2016	17,160	−4.6%
2021	18,327	+6.8%

As a census division in the 2021 Census of Population conducted by Statistics Canada, Kings County had a population of 18,327 living in 7,678 of its 9,948 total private dwellings, a change of 6.8% from its 2016 population of 17,154. With a land area of 1,687.58 km^{2} (651.58 sq mi), it had a population density of 10.9/km^{2} (28.1/sq mi) in 2021.

== Communities ==
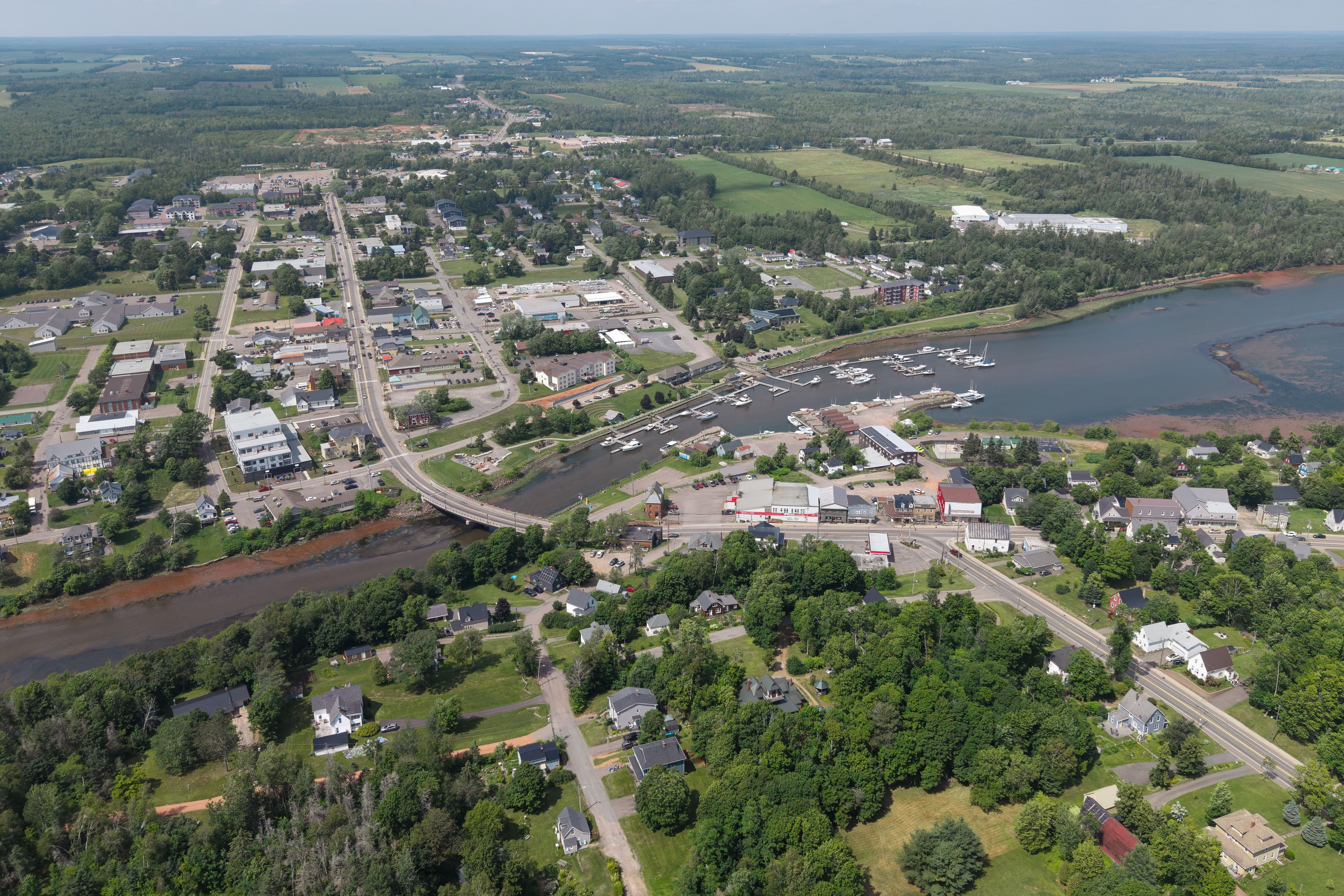
Montague, the largest community in Kings County

Towns

- Three Rivers
- Souris

Municipalities

- Annandale
- Central Kings
- Eastern Kings
- Elmira
- Morell
- Murray Harbour
- Murray River
- Souris West
- St. Peters Bay

Unincorporated

- Bothwell
- Fortune Bridge
- North Lake
- Valleyfield

Indian reserves

- Morell 2

== See also ==
- Royal eponyms in Canada
- Bliss and Wisdom
