= Samuel Holland (surveyor) =

British Army officer and surveyor

Samuel Johannes Holland
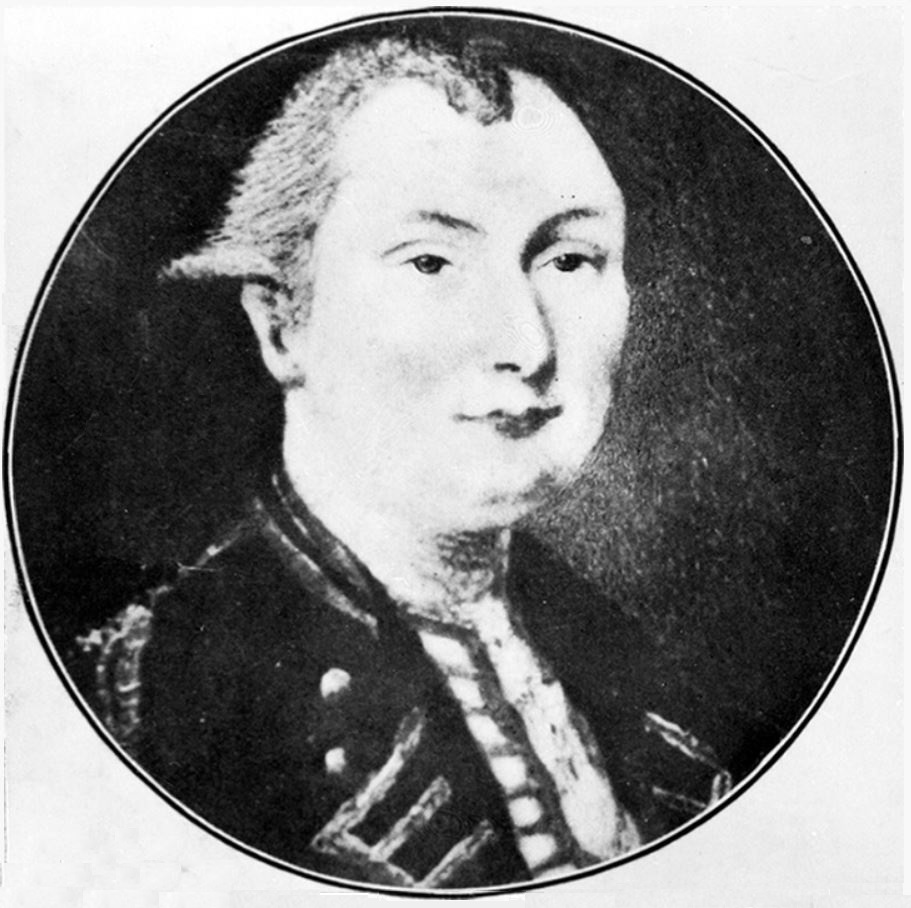
- Samuel Johannes Holland

Surveyor General of North America
- In office 1764–1791
- Preceded by: None
- Succeeded by: Himself as Surveyor General of Upper and Lower Canada

Surveyor General of Upper Canada
- In office 1791–1798
- Preceded by: Himself as Surveyor General of North America
- Succeeded by: Sir David William Smith, 1st Baronet

Surveyor General of Lower Canada
- In office 1791–1801
- Preceded by: Himself as Surveyor General of North America
- Succeeded by: Joseph Bouchette

Personal details
- Born: 1728 Deventer, Dutch Republic
- Died: 1801 (aged 72–73) Quebec, Lower Canada
- Spouse: Gertrude Hasse m. 1749
- Children: 1
- Occupation: Royal engineer

Samuel Johannes Holland (1728 – 28 December 1801) was a Dutch-born Royal Engineer and first Surveyor General of British North America.

== Life in the Netherlands ==
Holland was born in 1728 in Deventer, the Netherlands. He was baptised on 22 September 1729 in the small Lutheran Church in the Dutch town of Deventer, in the Province of Overijssel. In 1745, he entered the Dutch, or Staatse Leger artillery, and served during the War of the Austrian Succession. He was promoted to lieutenant in 1747.

In 1749, Holland married Gertrude Hasse. They had one daughter, who is thought to have died in infancy. In 1754, having possibly made contact with the Duke of Richmond and leaving his wife behind in the Netherlands, Holland emigrated to England to seek advancement under the British flag.

== Early years in British North America ==
In 1756, Holland, probably with Richmond's aid, became a lieutenant in the Royal Americans, coming to British North America where he would spend the rest of his life. Among his first assignments was the preparation of a map of New York Province that would be widely used for twenty years.

In 1757, during the French and Indian Wars, he was promoted Captain lieutenant and assigned to reconnoitre Fort Carillon, near Ticonderoga, New York, but in early 1758, he was transferred as assistant engineer to the expedition against Louisbourg. There, Holland made surveys of the surrounding area and prepared plans and gave engineering advice under the command of Brigadier-General James Wolfe. After Louisbourg's capitulation, Holland was strongly commended by Wolfe to the Duke of Richmond.

That winter, Holland and his new pupil, James Cook, drew charts of the Gulf of Saint Lawrence and Saint Lawrence River in preparation for an attack on Quebec. He also supervised the construction of Fort Frederick in Saint John, New Brunswick. He was promoted captain in 1759, participated actively in the Siege of Quebec, and narrowly escaped death by his boats being nearly run down by a schooner.

Holland was later employed in surveying the settled parts of the Saint Lawrence River Valley and in drawing up new plans for a citadel in Quebec after the French siege was lifted.

== Surveyor General ==
In 1762, Holland took his maps to London where he submitted them to the Board of Trade, proposing a survey of all British possessions in North America to facilitate settlement, a proposal that was accepted in 1764.

On 6 March 1764, Holland was appointed Surveyor-General of North America. On 23 March, he received instructions to survey all British possessions north of the Potomac River, which included St. John's Island, the Magdalen Islands, and Cape Breton Island, because of their importance for the fisheries.

Holland arrived in October 1764 on Isle Saint-Jean (now Prince Edward Island), whose territory was ceded to Britain under the Treaty of Paris (1763). The task of mapping the island lasted two years. Holland's survey divided the island into a series of townships known as "lots", parishes, counties, and "royalties" (shire towns) in advance of a feudal land system which was established on the island over the following century. Holland was later given a parcel of land on the St. John's Island, Lot 28, settled by farmers. Holland charged very little as an absentee landlord.

In 1767, he proposed that British explorers look for a Northwest Passage from the Atlantic Ocean to the Pacific Ocean, but his proposal was never taken into great consideration.

In 1791, he became the Surveyor-General of Lower Canada and Upper Canada and was replaced with Sir David William Smith, 1st Baronet in 1792.

== Personal life ==
Holland had begun living in Quebec as early as 1762 with then 21-year-old Marie-Joseph Rollet. Their first son, John Frederick, was born in what is now Prince Edward Island.

Although his separation from Gertrude Hasse had been amicable, he still paid her an annual allowance between 1756 and 1780. In 1784, Hasse unsuccessfully petitioned the British government to force him to renew payments.

In about 1772, Holland's marriage to Marie-Joseph Rollet was contracted as legal. The couple would eventually establish a family of ten children.

Holland died at Quebec, Lower Canada, in 1801 and was buried in a private cemetery on his Holland House estate or Holland Farm. This estate has since been re-developed.

== Honours ==
Holland College, a community college system in Prince Edward Island, is named for Samuel Holland, whose descendants operate Samuel's, a chain of coffee houses in the province.

The Captain Samuel Holland rose, developed by Agriculture and Agri-Food Canada, was named in his honour.

The Holland River, in Ontario, which drains about 20,000 acres of the Holland Marsh into Lake Simcoe is named after him, as well as the community of Holland Landing, Ontario.

Samuel Holland Park and Holland Avenue in Quebec City are the only reminders of his Holland House estate.
