= List of postal codes of Canada: C =

This is a list of postal codes in Canada where the first letter is C. Postal codes beginning with C are located within the Canadian province of Prince Edward Island. Only the first three characters are listed, corresponding to the Forward Sortation Area (FSA).

Canada Post provides a free postal code look-up tool on its website, via its mobile apps for smartphones, and sells hard-copy directories and CD-ROMs. Many vendors also sell validation tools, which allow customers to properly match addresses and postal codes. Hard-copy directories can also be consulted in all post offices, and some libraries.

== Prince Edward Island ==
There are currently 5 FSAs in this list.

=== Urban ===
C1A; Charlottetown; Southeast Prince Edward Island Provincial Government	C1B; Stratford	C1C; Charlottetown; North	C1E; Charlottetown; West	C1G; Not assigned
C1H; Not assigned	C1J; Not assigned	C1K; Not assigned	C1L; Not assigned	C1M; Not assigned
C1N; Summerside	C1P; Not assigned	C1R; Not assigned	C1S; Not assigned	C1T; Not assigned
C1V; Not assigned	C1W; Not assigned	C1X; Not assigned	C1Y; Not assigned	C1Z; Not assigned

=== Rural ===
C0A
Kings and Queens counties

1A0: Belfast
1B0: Belle River
1C0: Bonshaw
1E0: Breadalbane
1G0: Cardigan
1H0: Cornwall
1J0: Crapaud
1K0: Elmira
1L0: Georgetown
1M0: Green Gables
1N0: Hunter River
1P0: York
1R0: Montague
1S0: Morell
1T0: Mount Stewart
1V0: Murray Harbour
1W0: Murray River
1X0: North Rustico
1Y0: North Wiltshire
2A0: St-Peters Bay
2B0: Souris
2E0: Vernon Bridge
2G0: Victoria
3H0: Cornwall

C0B
Prince County

1A0: Albany
1B0: Alberton
1C0: Bedeque
1E0: Bloomfield Station
1G0: Central Bedeque
1H0: Coleman
1J0: Ellerslie
1K0: Elmsdale
1L0: Freetown
1M0: Kensington
1N0: Kinkora
1P0: Lennox Island
1S0: Miminegash
1T0: Miscouche
1V0: O'Leary
1X0: Borden-Carleton
1Y0: Richmond
1Z0: St-Louis
2A0: Slemon Park
2B0: Tignish
2C0: Tyne Valley
2E0: Wellington Station

== Forward Sortation Areas by population ==
1. C0A, 48,140
2. C0B, 29,902
3. C1A, 25,861
4. C1N, 17,691
5. C1B, 14,817
6. C1E, 12,681
7. C1C, 5,239
