= Prince Edward Island Route 2 =

Highway in Prince Edward Island, Canada

Route 2
- All Weather Highway; Veterans Memorial Highway
- Route 2 highlighted in red.
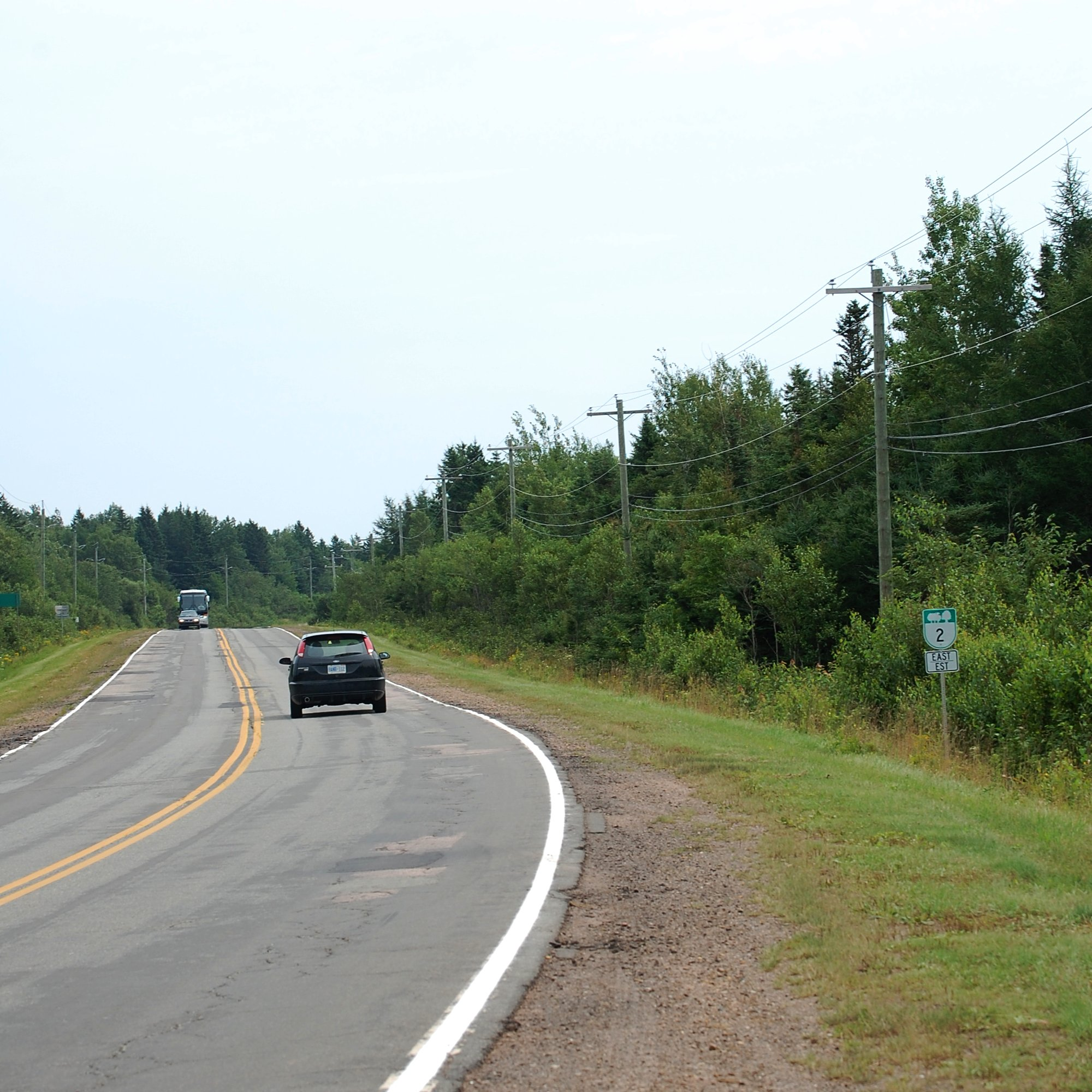

Route information
- Maintained by Department of Transportation, Infrastructure, and Energy
- Length: 217.1 km (134.9 mi)
- Existed: 1890–present

Major junctions
- West end: Route 14 in Tignish
- Route 14 in Carleton; Route 12 in Portage; Route 11 in Mount Pleasant; Route 12 in Miscouche; Route 1A in Summerside; Route 6 / Route 20 in Kensington; Route 8 in Summerfield; Route 13 in Hunter River; Route 9 near Brookfield; Route 7 near Milton Station; Route 1 (TCH) in Charlottetown; Route 15 in Charlottetown; Route 6 at Bedford Corner; Route 22 in Mount Stewart; Route 16 in St. Peters Bay; Route 4 in Dingwells Mills
- East end: Route 16 in Souris

Location
- Country: Canada
- Province: Prince Edward Island
- Counties: Kings, Queens, Prince
- Major cities: Charlottetown, Summerside

Highway system
- Provincial highways in Prince Edward Island
← Route 1A	→ Route 3

Route 2, also known as Veterans Memorial Highway and the All Weather Highway, is the longest highway in the province of Prince Edward Island, Canada, at 216 kilometres (134 mi). It is a two-lane uncontrolled access highway that runs nearly the entire length of the province, from Tignish to Souris. Route 2 was recognized as the first numbered highway in the province in 1890, when it opened between Charlottetown and Summerside.

It passes through the cities of Summerside and Charlottetown and roughly parallels the former primary railway line through the province, which was abandoned in 1989.

The highway was first paved in the 1950s with many upgrades in recent decades. A perimeter arterial highway (ring road) across the northern and eastern part of Charlottetown was constructed as part of Route 2 in the 1990s with funding from a $200 million federal adjustment fund for road construction after the railway was abandoned. This section of road was extended to Upton Road and is now signed for Route 1 (the Trans-Canada Highway), although Route 2 uses a small portion of the arterial highway between the Malpeque Road and St. Peter's Highway.

== Names ==
Route 2 is commonly called the "All Weather Highway," as it was one of the first roads in Prince Edward Island to be open for traffic in all seasons. In June 2002, premier Pat Binns designated the highway the "Veterans Memorial Highway". Transportation minister Don MacKinnon said that the designation honoured the highway's vital role in the Second World War, when it provided "a transportation link to the military facilities of CFB Summerside and the air training facility in Mount Pleasant".

Route 2 has several local names:

- Souris Road (Souris to Route 4 at Dingwells Mills)
- St. Peter's Highway (Dingwells Mills to Charlottetown)
- Malpeque Road (Charlottetown to Hunter River); the Malpeque Road alignment continuing thereafter on the Old Princetown Road
- New Annan Road (Kensington to Summerside)
- Western Road (Summerside to Tignish)

== Mount Pleasant diversion ==
The portion of the highway running through the farming hamlet of Mount Pleasant west of Summerside was diverted for several years during the 1940s with the establishment of an air force base named RCAF Station Mount Pleasant. The base was closed following World War II and the "Western Road" was returned to its original alignment which currently runs along the former flight line and tarmac of the air force base. The diversion road constructed around the base is still in use as a local public road.

== Major intersections ==
County	Location	km	mi	Destinations	Notes
Prince		−1.4	−0.87	Route 12 – North Cape, Alberton	
Prince	Tignish	0.0	0.0	Route 14 east / Route 153 south (Church Street) – Skinners Pond, Alberton	Current western terminus of Route 2
Prince	Tignish	1.3	0.81	Route 160 north (Ascension Road)	
Prince		2.1	1.3	Route 158 west (Harper Road)	
Prince	St. Peter and St. Paul	4.5	2.8	Route 157 west (Deblois Road)	
Prince	Profits Corner	11.1	6.9	Route 152 (Union Road)	
Prince	Alma	12.5– 12.6	7.8– 7.8	Route 151 (Centre Line Road)	Intersections offset; 80 m (260 ft) concurrency
Prince	Elmsdale	16.9	10.5	Route 150 (Dock Road)	
Prince	Rosebank	20.1	12.5	Route 149 west (Piusville Road)	
Prince	Bloomfield Corner	24.2	15.0	Route 145 (Mill River East Road / Ohalloran Road) – Mill River East, Campbellton	Roundabout
Prince		26.1	16.2	Route 146 (Duvar Road)	
Prince	St. Anthony	26.8	16.7	Route 143 west (Howlan Road)	
Prince	St. Anthony	27.0	16.8	Route 136 east (Mill Road)	
Prince	Woodstock	29.2	18.1	Route 142 (O'Leary Road / Kelly Road) – Cascumpec, O'Leary	Roundabout
Prince	Carleton	31.9	19.8	Route 137 east (Trout River Road)	
Prince	Carleton	37.6	23.4	Route 14 west – Coleman, West Point	
Prince	West Devon	35.9	22.3	Route 138 south (Beaton Road)	
Prince		37.6	23.4	Route 12 west – Cascumpec, Alberton	West end of Route 12 concurrency
Prince	Portage	40.3	25.0	Route 12 east – Foxley River	East end of Route 12 concurrency
Prince	Inverness	42.7	26.5	Route 175 north (Conway Road)	
Prince		46.2	28.7	Route 134 east (McNeills Mills Road)	
Prince		49.9	31.0	Route 133 east (Ellerslie Road)	
Prince	Mount Pleasant	50.3	31.3	Route 11 east – Enmore	
Prince		51.0	31.7	Route 169 east (Port Hill Station Road)	
Prince	Springhill	54.4	33.8	Route 130 west (Richards Road)	
Prince		55.6	34.5	Route 132 east (Northam Road)	
Prince		56.5	35.1	Route 128 wast (Harmony Line Road)	
Prince	Richmond	59.2	36.8	Route 127 (MacIsacc Road Road)	
Prince		55.6	34.5	Route 132 east (Sunnyside Road)	
Prince		62.6	38.9	Route 125 west (Hackmatack Road)	
Prince	Wellington Centre	63.8	39.6	Route 179 west (Goodwin Road)	
Prince		65.2	40.5	Route 124 west (Wellington Road) – Wellington	
Prince		68.8	42.8	Route 122 north (Allen Road)	
Prince	Miscouche	74.0	46.0	Route 12 – Central Lot 16, Belmont, Southwest Lot 16	
Prince	Summerside	80.7	50.1	Central Street	Former Route 121
Prince	Summerside	81.0	50.3	Granville Street	Roundabout
Prince	Summerside	82.0	51.0	Route 180 north (Shore Road)	
Prince	Travellers Rest	84.1	52.3	Route 1A south to Route 11 (Water Street) / Route 1 (TCH) – Summerside, Borden-Carleton, Confederation Bridge	Roundabout
Prince		86.4– 86.5	53.7– 53.7	Route 120 (Waterview Road / Wilmont Valley Road)	Intersections offset; 120 m (390 ft) concurrency
Prince	New Annan	88.2	54.8	Route 106 north (Clermont Road)	
Prince		89.5	55.6	Route 110 north (Old Station Road)	West end of Route 110 concurrency
Prince		89.8	55.8	Route 110 south (MacIntyre Road)	East end of Route 110 concurrency
Prince	Kensington	92.6	57.5	Route 20 north (Broadway Street N) / Route 6 east (Victoria Street E) to Route 101 north – Margate, Mapeque, Cavendish	
Prince	Kensington	93.0	57.8	Route 109 south (Barrett Street)	
Prince	Norboro	96.2– 96.3	59.8– 59.8	Route 107 (Blue Shank Road / Nineteen Road)	Intersections offset; 90 m (300 ft) concurrency
Prince		98.9	61.5	Route 108 west (North Freetown Road)	
Prince—Queens county line		99.1	61.6	Route 233 north (County Line Road)	
Queens	Summerfield	100.4– 100.6	62.4– 62.5	Route 8 (Freetown Road / Grahams Road) – New London, Freetown	Intersections offset; 160 m (520 ft) concurrency
Queens	Springfield	103.7	64.4	Route 254 north (Rattenbury Road)	
Queens		106.1	65.9	Route 231 (Ascension Road / Millvale Road)	
Queens		108.1	67.2	Route 227 south (Junction Road)	
Queens	Pleasant Valley	108.6	67.5	Route 230 north (Smith Road)	
Queens	Fredericton	111.0	69.0	Route 264 south (Fredericton Station Road)	
Queens	Hazelgrove	112.6	70.0	Route 228 north (Bertram Road)	
Queens		114.6	71.2	Route 228 west (Hazel Grove Road)	
Queens		115.0	71.5	Route 239 north	
Queens	Hunter River	117.4	72.9	Route 13 – Cavendish, Crapaud, Borden-Carleton	
Queens	Greenville	120.5	74.9	Route 243 north	
Queens	Brookfield	123.4– 123.5	76.7– 76.7	Route 226 (Millboro Road / Darlington Road)	Intersections offset; 100 m (330 ft) concurrency
Queens		124.4	77.3	Route 9 south – Hampshire	
Queens	Springvale	126.8	78.8	Route 256 south (Loyalist Road)	West end of Route 256 concurrency
Queens	Springvale	127.3	79.1	Route 256 west (Crabbe Road)	East end of Route 256 concurrency
Queens	Milton Station	129.3	80.3	Route 248 south (North York River Road) – Warren Grove, Cornwall	
Queens	Milton Station	130.2	80.9	Route 7 north – North Rustico, Cavendish	
Queens		131.5	81.7	Route 236 south (Lower Malpeque Road)	
Queens	Charlottetown	133.2	82.8	Route 233 north (Winsloe Road)	
Queens	Charlottetown	135.7	84.3	Route 1 (TCH) west (Perimeter Highway) / Malpeque Road – Cornwall, Borden-Carleton	Route 2 branches east onto Perimeter Highway; west end of Route 1 concurrency
Queens	Charlottetown	136.5	84.8	Mount Edward Road	
Queens	Charlottetown	137.4	85.4	Route 15 north (Brackley Point Road) – Charlottetown Airport, Brackley Beach	
Queens	Charlottetown	138.9	86.3	Route 1 (TCH) east (Perimeter Highway) / St. Peters Road – Stratford, Wood Islands	Route 2 branches east onto St. Peters Road; east end of Route 1 concurrency; displaced left turn
Queens	Marshfield	142.2	88.4	Route 25 north – York, Stanhope	
Queens		145.6	90.5	Route 222 north (Suffolk Road)	
Queens		147.5	91.7	Route 260 east (Frenchfort Road)	
Queens	Bedford Corner	149.1	92.6	Route 6 north – Stanhope, Grand Tacadie	
Queens		150.2	93.3	Route 260 west (Frenchfort Road)	West end of Route 260 concurrency
Queens		150.5	93.5	Route 260 north (Corrigan Road)	East end of Route 260 concurrency
Queens	Tenmile House	151.9	94.4	Route 218 east (Portage Road)	
Queens	Tracadie Cross	154.5	96.0	Route 218 (Blooming Point Road / Portage Road)	
Queens	Mount Stewart	162.0	100.7	Route 22 south – Cardigan, Pisquid	
Queens	St. Andrews	163.6	101.7	Route 217 north (French Village Road)	
Kings		165.3	102.7	Route 323 east	
Kings	Canavoy	168.5	104.7	Route 352 (MacEwans Creek Road / Douglas Station Road)	
Kings		172.8	107.4	Route 350 west (Lakeside Road)	
Kings	Morell	176.9	109.9	Route 322 south (Green Meadows Road)	
Kings	Morell East	178.3	110.8	Route 321 south (Bangor Road)	
Kings	Marie	181.5	112.8	Route 337 south (Milburn Road)	
Kings	Midgell	182.8	113.6	Route 331 south (Church Road)	
Kings	St. Peters Bay	187.2	116.3	Route 313 south (Cardigan Road) to Route 312 – Cardigan	West end of Route 313 concurrency
Kings	St. Peters Bay	187.5	116.5	Route 16 north / Route 313 north – Cable Head	East end of Route 313 concurrency
Kings		193.2	120.0	Route 327 south (Albion Road)	
Kings	Dingwells Mills	200.2	124.4	Route 4 west (Dundas Road) / Route 332 south (Fortune Road) – Montague, Georgetown	
Kings		201.5	125.2	Route 309 south (Selkirk Road)	
Kings	Fortune Bridge	204.9	127.3	Route 340 east (Fortune Wharf North Road)	
Kings	Rollo Bay West	206.5	128.3	Route 310 south (Fortune Road)	
Kings	Rollo Bay West	206.8	128.5	Route 308 north (St. Charles Road)	
Kings		209.2	130.0	Route 307 north (Bear River Road)	
Kings	Rollo Bay	210.9	131.0	Route 330 (Gowan Brae Road / Lower Rollo Bay Road)	
Kings	Souris West	213.5	132.7	Route 306 north (New Zealand Road)	
Kings	Souris West	213.8	132.8	Route 330 west (Lower Rollo Bay Road)	
Kings	Souris	215.3	133.8	Route 305 north (Chapel Avenue)	
Kings	Souris	217.1	134.9	Route 16 east (East Point Road) / MacPhee Avenue – South Lake, Îles de la Madeleine	Eastern terminus of Route 2; roadway continues as Route 16
1.000 mi = 1.609 km; 1.000 km = 0.621 mi: Closed/former; Concurrency terminus
