= Prince Edward Island Route 6 =

Highway in Prince Edward Island, Canada

Route 6

Route information
- Maintained by Prince Edward Island Transportation and Public Works
- Length: 68.7 km (42.7 mi)

Major junctions
- West end: Route 2 / Route 20 in Kensington
- Route 8 / Route 20 at New London Route 13 in Cavendish; Route 7 at Oyster Bed Bridge; Route 15 at Brackley Beach; Route 25A at West Covehead Route 25 at Covehead and Stanhope
- East end: Route 2 at Bedford Corner

Location
- Country: Canada
- Province: Prince Edward Island
- Counties: Prince, Queens

Highway system
- Provincial highways in Prince Edward Island
← Route 5	→ Route 7

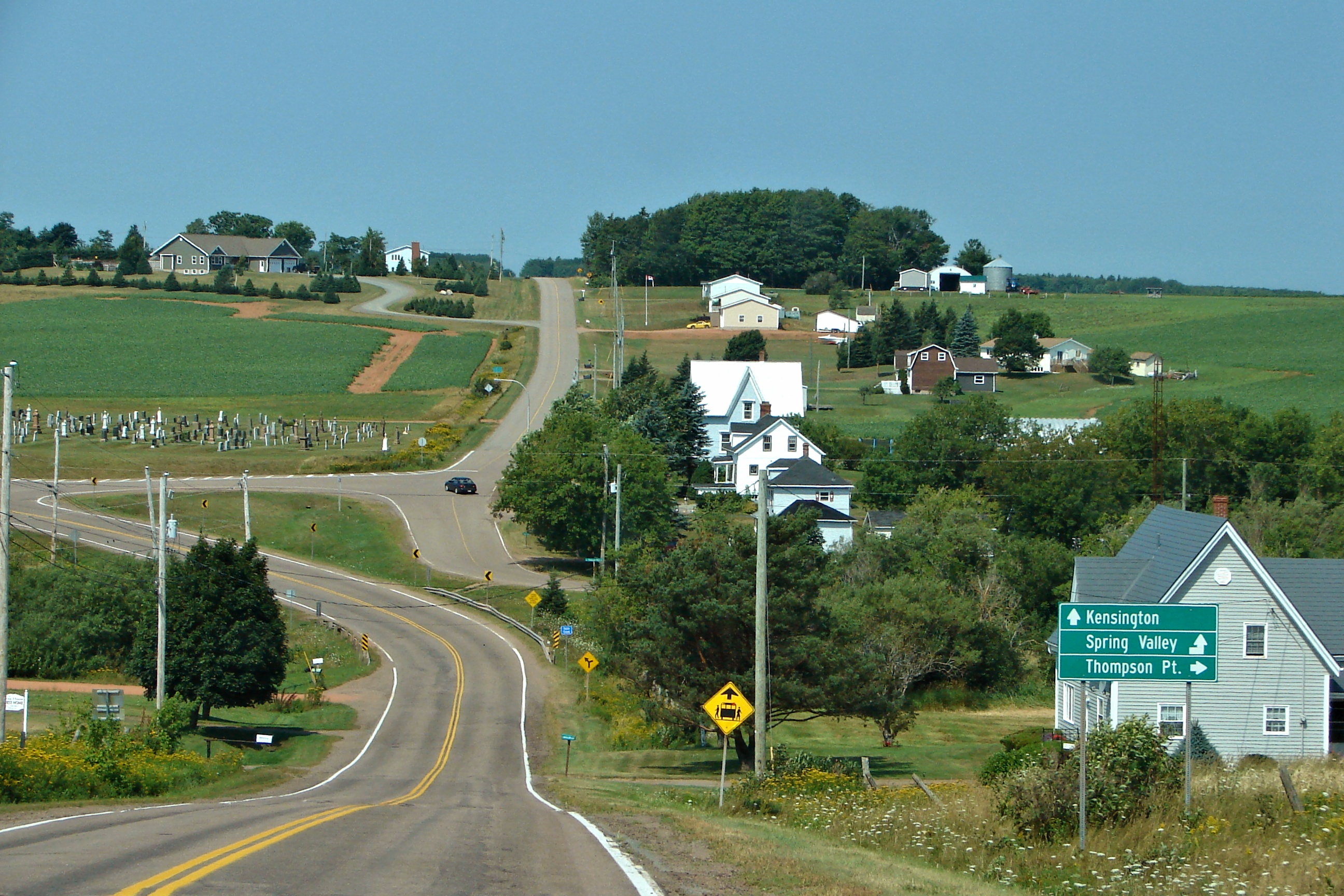
Route 6 at Margate

Prince Edward Island Route 6 is a secondary highway in central Prince Edward Island.

Route 6 begins in Kensington at the junction of Routes 2 and 20, bearing east. It passes the community of New London before turning at a roundabout in Stanley Bridge. It is the main road through Cavendish, meeting Route 13 in the town, then turning south towards North Rustico. It meets Route 7 at Oyster Bed Bridge, turning east once again. Route 6 is co-signed with Route 15 for 3.5 kilometres (2.2 mi) south of Brackley Beach, then Route 6 proceeds east through Covehead and Stanhope, cosigned with Route 25 for 1.9 kilometres (1.2 mi). It turns south once again near Grand Tracadie before terminating at Route 2 at Bedford Corner, near Dunstaffnage.

== Major intersections ==
County	Location	km	mi	Destinations	Notes
Prince	Kensington	0.0	0.0	Route 2 west (Victoria Street) – Summerside Route 2 east / Route 20 north (Broadway Street) – Charlottetown, Malpeque	Western terminus
Prince	Kensington	0.07	0.043	Route 101 north (Woodleigh Drive) – Park Corner	
Prince	Margate	4.5	2.8	Route 104 north	
Prince—Queens county line		5.0	3.1	Route 233 south (County Line Road)	
Queens	Clinton	7.9	4.9	Route 107 south (Kerrytown Road)	
Queens	New London	11.3	7.0	Route 20 north / Route 8 south (Grahams Road) – French River, Summerfield	
Queens		12.8	8.0	Route 238 (Fountain Road / Campbellton Road)	
Queens	Stanley Bridge	15.2	9.4	Route 238 north (Campbellton Road)	
Queens	Stanley Bridge	15.9	9.9	Route 254 south (Rattenbury Road) – North Granville, Springfield; Route 224 east (St. Marys Road) – Hope River, New Glasgow	Roundabout
Queens	Cavendish	20.3	12.6	Grahams Lane	
Queens	Cavendish	22.9	14.2	Route 13 (to West Gulf Shore Parkway) – Prince Edward Island National Park, New Glasgow, Hunter River	
Queens	North Rustico	30.0	18.6	Harbourview Drive (to West Gulf Shore Parkway) − Prince Edward Island National Park	
Queens	North Rustico	26.8	16.7	Route 269 west (Line Road)	
Queens	Rusticoville	29.2	18.1	Route 258 west – New Glasgow	
Queens		35.0	21.7	Route 243 north (Buntain Road)	
Queens	South Rustico	36.0	22.4	Route 243 (Church Road)	
Queens	South Rustico	36.3	22.6	Route 242 east (Grand Pere Point Road)	
Queens		39.3	24.4	Route 242 west (Grand Pere Point Road)	
Queens	Oyster Bed Bridge	41.6	25.8	Route 7 south (Rustico Road) / Route 251 west (Crooked Creek Road) – Charlottetown, Wheatley River	Roundabout
Queens	Oyster Bed Bridge	42.1	26.2	Route 223 south (Winsloe Road)	
Queens	Brackley Beach	45.5	28.3	Route 15 north – Prince Edward Island National Park	West end of Route 15 concurrency
Queens	Brackley Point	48.0	29.8	Route 15 south – Charlottetown	East end of Route 15 concurrency
Queens		49.9	31.0	Route 221 south (Union Road)	
Queens		50.8	31.6	Route 252 east (MacMillan Point Road)	
Queens	West Covehead	52.0	32.3	Route 252 west (MacMillan Point Road)	
Queens	West Covehead	52.5	32.6	Route 25A south (West Covehead Road)	
Queens	Covehead	53.6	33.3	Route 25 south – Charlottetown	West end of Route 25 concurrency
Queens	Stanhope	55.5	34.5	Route 25 north – Covehead Harbour, Prince Edward Island National Park	East end of Route 25 concurrency
Queens	Dalvay	58.9	36.6	Gulf Shore Parkway − Prince Edward Island National Park	
Queens	Grand Tracadie	60.4	37.5	Route 220 south (Pleasant Grove Road)	
Queens		63.7	39.6	Route 219 east (Donaldson Road)	
Queens	Millcove	65.8	40.9	Route 229 west (Millcove Road / Dougan Road)	
Queens	Bedford Corner	68.7	42.7	Route 2 – Souris, Charlottetown	
1.000 mi = 1.609 km; 1.000 km = 0.621 mi: Concurrency terminus
