= List of historic places in Queens County, Prince Edward Island =

This is a list of historic places in Queens County, Prince Edward Island entered on the Canadian Register of Historic Places, whether they are federal, provincial, or municipal. Places listed in Charlottetown are listed separately.

== List of historic places outside Charlottetown ==
Name	Address	Coordinates	Government recognition (CRHP №)	Wikidata ID	Image
Acadian-Scottish Ancient Burial Ground	142 Selkirk Park Road; Eldon PE	46°05′36″N 62°54′46″W	Prince Edward Island (14923), Eldon municipality (9701)		Upload Photo
Atwell House	14718 Trans Canada Highway, Route 1 Clyde PE	46°13′32″N 63°15′09″W	Prince Edward Island (1630)		Upload Photo
Back Range Light Tower	New London PE	46°30′36″N 63°29′13″W	Federal (11290), Prince Edward Island (19731)		
Bagnall House	22, Route 239; Hazel Grove PE	46°22′01″N 63°22′31″W	Prince Edward Island (10471)		Upload Photo
Balahan House Farm	66 Keppoch Road; Stratford PE	46°12′30″N 63°06′30″W	Prince Edward Island (10613)		Upload Photo
Barachois Inn	2193 Church Road; Anglo Rustico PE	46°25′24″N 63°17′06″W	Prince Edward Island (18473)		
Barton Lodge	948 Winsloe Road, Rte. 223; South Winsloe PE	46°21′03″N 63°11′56″W	Prince Edward Island (18698)		Upload Photo
Bayfield-Jaynes Property	42 Owen Lane; Stratford PE	46°11′47″N 63°06′33″W	Prince Edward Island (17923), Stratford municipality (1265)		Upload Photo
Belle River Pioneer Cemetery	Factory Road; Belle River PE	45°58′55″N 62°50′10″W	Prince Edward Island (12204)		Upload Photo
Ben Bernard House	4296, Route 13; Hunter River PE	46°21′18″N 63°20′55″W	Prince Edward Island (10378)		Upload Photo
Bertram Home	4281 Hopedale Road, Route 13; Hunter River PE	46°21′16″N 63°20′57″W	Prince Edward Island (10321)		Upload Photo
Harvey and Velda Bertram House	24 Hazel Grove Road, Route 228; Hazel Grove PE	46°22′06″N 63°22′52″W	Prince Edward Island (10397)		Upload Photo
Binstead	300 Heartz Road; Stratford PE	46°16′26″N 63°05′11″W	Stratford municipality (3681)		Upload Photo
Blockhouse Lighthouse	285 Blockhouse Road; Rocky Point PE	46°11′27″N 63°07′48″W	Federal (10654), Prince Edward Island (19726)		
Bonshaw Hall	9 Green Road; Bonshaw PE	46°11′46″N 63°21′03″W	Prince Edward Island (20266)		Upload Photo
Bonshaw Pioneer Cemetery	Trans Canada Highway; Bonshaw PE	46°11′40″N 63°21′06″W	Prince Edward Island (1952)		Upload Photo
Boswell Home	98 Nelson Street; Victoria PE	46°13′04″N 63°29′35″W	Prince Edward Island (5642)		Upload Photo
The Brick House / William Mutch House	29 Stratford Road; Stratford PE	46°13′36″N 63°06′08″W	Prince Edward Island (10608)		Upload Photo
The Burke House	2 Glencove Drive; Stratford PE	46°13′01″N 63°06′07″W	Prince Edward Island (15212)		Upload Photo
Carlyle Cahill House	8 Bayside Drive; Stratford PE	46°13′25″N 63°06′23″W	Prince Edward Island (10611)		Upload Photo
R.H. Cameron House	60 Old Mill Road; Crapaud PE	46°14′20″N 63°29′52″W	Prince Edward Island (20444)		Upload Photo
Silver Bush Campbell Farm House	4542 Route 20; Park Corner PE	46°31′50″N 63°32′12″W	Prince Edward Island (19146)		Upload Photo
Canoe Cove School	1066 Canoe Cove Road, Route 19A; Canoe Cove PE	46°09′18″N 63°17′43″W	Prince Edward Island (1773)		Upload Photo
Christ Church Anglican	100 Cherry Valley Cove Road; Cherry Valley PE	46°10′28″N 62°55′46″W	Prince Edward Island (18701)		Upload Photo
D.E. Clarke's General Store	98 MacPhail Park Road; Orwell PE	46°09′29″N 62°49′59″W	Prince Edward Island (1623)		Upload Photo
Clifton Farm / William Mason House	75 Mason Road; Stratford PE	46°14′21″N 63°05′16″W	Prince Edward Island (10556)		Upload Photo
Clifton United Church	19 Clifton Road; Stratford PE	46°14′11″N 63°05′25″W	Prince Edward Island (6304)		
Clyde River Pioneer Cemetery	South of Route 1 and East of Route 247; Clyde River PE	46°12′50″N 63°15′26″W	Prince Edward Island (11846)		Upload Photo
Covehead Harbour Lighthouse	Gulf Shore Parkway; Covehead PE	46°25′50″N 63°08′36″W	Federal (20729)		
Crane's Landing	10686 St. Peters Road, Route 2 Mount Stewart PE	46°22′03″N 62°52′31″W	Prince Edward Island (5367)		Upload Photo
Cross Roads Christian Church	15 Georgetown Road; Stratford PE	46°12′57″N 63°04′25″W	Prince Edward Island (10552)		Upload Photo
Dalvay-by-the-Sea Hotel	Route 6, Prince Edward Island National Park of Canada; Stanhope PE	46°24′50″N 63°04′33″W	Federal (4308)		More images
Dalvay-by-the-Sea National Historic Site of Canada	Route 6, Prince Edward Island National Park of Canada; Stanhope PE	46°24′49″N 63°04′33″W	Federal (1859)		
Dewar House	27 Hopeton Road; Stratford PE	46°13′51″N 63°05′54″W	Prince Edward Island (10565)		Upload Photo
Dockendorff Pioneer Cemetery	York Point Road; York Point PE	46°13′30″N 63°10′01″W	Prince Edward Island (11802)		Upload Photo
Doucet House	2188 Church Road, Route 243; Rustico PE	46°25′24″N 63°17′03″W	Prince Edward Island (1615)		More images
Emerald Railway Station	1929 Nodd Road; Emerald PE	46°21′41″N 63°32′55″W	Prince Edward Island (20442)		Upload Photo
Eureka House	20 Water Street; Victoria PE	46°12′49″N 63°29′26″W	Prince Edward Island (5672)		Upload Photo
Farmers' Bank of Rustico National Historic Site of Canada	South Rustico PE	46°25′00″N 63°18′00″W	Federal (7417), Prince Edward Island (19167)		
William Farquharson House	156 Bunbury Road; Stratford PE	46°14′05″N 63°04′54″W	Prince Edward Island (10555)		Upload Photo
Flat River Pioneer Cemetery	Beaton Lane; Flat River PE	46°00′31″N 62°52′54″W	Prince Edward Island (12210)		Upload Photo
The Forge	4377 Route 13; Hunter River PE	46°21′31″N 63°20′50″W	Prince Edward Island (10388)		Upload Photo
Former Hunter River Library	19792, Route 2 Hunter River PE	46°21′20″N 63°21′01″W	Prince Edward Island (10383)		Upload Photo
Former Noye House	4285 Hopedale Road, Route 13; Hunter River PE	46°21′17″N 63°20′57″W	Prince Edward Island (10392)		Upload Photo
Former St. Mary's of the People Catholic Church	19719, Route 2 Hunter River PE	46°21′14″N 63°20′47″W	Prince Edward Island (10501)		Upload Photo
Free Church of Scotland	8794 Rte. 19; DeSable PE	46°11′32″N 63°24′48″W	Prince Edward Island (18703)		Upload Photo
Geddie Memorial Church	5656 Rte. 20; Springbrook PE	46°29′41″N 63°30′23″W	Prince Edward Island (18700)		Upload Photo
Glasgow Road Cemetery	Route 224; Ebenezer PE	46°21′17″N 63°15′52″W	Prince Edward Island (12915)		Upload Photo
Glenaladale House	257 Blooming Point Road; Tracadie Cross PE	46°21′38″N 62°58′08″W	Prince Edward Island (19511)		Upload Photo
Green Gables House	Cavendish PE	46°29′30″N 63°23′06″W	Federal (11370)		More images
The Grist Mill	4373, Route 13; Hunter River PE	46°21′31″N 63°20′51″W	Prince Edward Island (13944), Hunter River municipality (11473)		Upload Photo
Harrington Pioneer Cemetery	Brackley Point Road, Route 15; Harrington PE	46°21′45″N 63°10′26″W	Prince Edward Island (10777)		Upload Photo
Hazeldean	172 Rattenbury Road; Springfield PE	46°23′33″N 63°30′28″W	Prince Edward Island (19145)		Upload Photo
Howard Christian Cemetery	Route 235; Kingston PE	46°15′32″N 63°15′17″W	Prince Edward Island (11816)		Upload Photo
2 Howard Street	2 Howard Street; Victoria PE	46°12′55″N 63°29′25″W	Prince Edward Island (5706)		Upload Photo
6 Howard Street	6 Howard Street; Victoria PE	46°12′54″N 63°29′26″W	Prince Edward Island (14931), Victoria municipality (5713)		Upload Photo
26 Howard Street	26 Howard Street; Victoria PE	46°12′53″N 63°29′30″W	Prince Edward Island (5715)		Upload Photo
Hunter River Presbyterian Church	19800, Route 2 Hunter River PE	46°21′21″N 63°21′03″W	Prince Edward Island (10340)		Upload Photo
Island Chocolates Company Building	7 Main Street; Victoria PE	46°12′51″N 63°29′27″W	Prince Edward Island (5643)		Upload Photo
Carter W. Jeffery Home	4367, Route 13; Hunter River PE	46°21′30″N 63°20′52″W	Prince Edward Island (10344)		Upload Photo
Jones House	720 Pownal Road; Pownal PE	46°11′47″N 62°59′45″W	Prince Edward Island (20995)		Upload Photo
Keppoch Farm House / Duncan House	22 Duncan Avenue; Stratford PE	46°11′57″N 63°06′08″W	Prince Edward Island (10585)		Upload Photo
The Landmark Café	12 Main Street; Victoria PE	46°12′53″N 63°29′27″W	Prince Edward Island (5678)		Upload Photo
Leards Range Front Lighthouse	2 Russell Street; Victoria PE	46°12′51″N 63°29′20″W	Prince Edward Island (19185)		
Long Pond Cemetery	Prince Edward Island National Park; Stanhope PE	46°25′00″N 63°05′37″W	Prince Edward Island (12221)		More images
5 Main Street	5 Main Street; Victoria PE	46°12′51″N 63°29′26″W	Prince Edward Island (5717)		Upload Photo
10 Main Street	10 Main Street; Victoria PE	46°12′53″N 63°29′26″W	Prince Edward Island (5719)		More images
22 Main Street	22 Main Street; Victoria PE	46°12′54″N 63°29′27″W	Prince Edward Island (5726)		Upload Photo
24 Main Street	24 Main Street; Victoria PE	46°12′55″N 63°29′28″W	Prince Edward Island (6028)		Upload Photo
27 Main Street	27 Main Street; Victoria PE	46°12′55″N 63°29′29″W	Prince Edward Island (6027)		Upload Photo
28 Main Street	28 Main Street; Victoria PE	46°12′56″N 63°29′28″W	Prince Edward Island (6029)		Upload Photo
30 Main Street	30 Main Street; Victoria PE	46°12′56″N 63°29′28″W	Prince Edward Island (6033)		Upload Photo
31 Main Street	31 Main Street; Victoria PE	46°12′56″N 63°29′30″W	Prince Edward Island (6044)		Upload Photo
Marshfield Pioneer Cemetery	14576 St. Peters Road - Route 2 Marshfield PE	46°17′37″N 63°05′02″W	Prince Edward Island (10615)		Upload Photo
The Martin House	162 Newtown Road - Route 211; Lower Newtown PE	46°06′37″N 62°51′29″W	Prince Edward Island (2360)		Upload Photo
Sir Andrew Macphail Homestead	269 Macphail Park Road; Orwell PE	46°09′33″N 62°49′22″W	Prince Edward Island (5308)		Upload Photo
McArthur Family Cemetery	Peter's Road, Route 244; Churchill PE	46°13′37″N 63°19′34″W	Prince Edward Island (10635)		Upload Photo
McEachern Family Plot	907 St. Catherines Road; St. Catherine's PE	46°11′50″N 63°18′14″W	Prince Edward Island (11854)		Upload Photo
Mill Brook Farm	40 Keppoch Road; Stratford PE	46°12′42″N 63°06′20″W	Prince Edward Island (10634)		Upload Photo
Senator Donald Montgomery House	4615 Rte. 20; Park Corner PE	46°31′51″N 63°32′23″W	Prince Edward Island (20523)		Upload Photo
Lucy Maud Montgomery Birthplace	6461 Route 20; New London PE	46°27′55″N 63°30′40″W	Prince Edward Island (17721)		Upload Photo
L.M. Montgomery's Cavendish National Historic Site of Canada	Route 6 Cavendish PE	46°29′17″N 63°22′42″W	Federal (5439)		
Lauchlin Morrison House	3412 Trans Canada Highway - Route 1 South Pinette PE	46°02′17″N 62°54′27″W	Prince Edward Island (15829)		Upload Photo
Murchison House	394 MacAulays Wharf Road; Mount Buchanan PE	46°03′53″N 62°55′52″W	Prince Edward Island (20973)		Upload Photo
Murphy House	4352 Rte. 19; Cumberland PE	46°09′44″N 63°11′34″W	Prince Edward Island (19904)		Upload Photo
8 Nelson Street	8 Nelson Street; Victoria PE	46°12′50″N 63°29′29″W	Prince Edward Island (8727)		Upload Photo
10 Nelson Street	10 Nelson Street; Victoria PE	46°12′51″N 63°29′29″W	Prince Edward Island (6053)		Upload Photo
31 Nelson Street / Dunrovin	31 Nelson Street; Victoria PE	46°12′56″N 63°29′34″W	Prince Edward Island (6230)		Upload Photo
88 Nelson Street / The Rowans	88 Nelson Street; Victoria PE	46°13′02″N 63°29′35″W	Prince Edward Island (6237)		Upload Photo
132 Nelson Street	132 Nelson Street; Victoria PE	46°13′07″N 63°29′36″W	Prince Edward Island (6243)		Upload Photo
New London Hall	10596 Rte 6 New London PE	46°27′54″N 63°30′32″W	Prince Edward Island (18678)		Upload Photo
Newson's Pioneer Cemetery	Route 248 - Ferry Road; Cornwall PE	46°13′35″N 63°12′36″W	Prince Edward Island (11804)		Upload Photo
Alan and Mary Nisbet Home	4273 Hopedale Road - Route 13; Hunter River PE	46°21′15″N 63°20′58″W	Prince Edward Island (10460)		Upload Photo
North Rustico Lighthouse	383 Harbourview Drive; North Rustico PE	46°27′19″N 63°17′30″W	Federal (11435), Prince Edward Island (19724)		
Old Princetown Road	Old Princetown Road; South Granville PE	46°24′32″N 63°29′14″W	Prince Edward Island (10672)		Upload Photo
The Orient Hotel	34 Main Street; Victoria PE	46°12′57″N 63°29′29″W	Prince Edward Island (5677)		More images
Orwell Church	RR #2 Vernon; Orwell PE	46°09′25″N 62°50′05″W	Prince Edward Island (4602)		Upload Photo
Orwell School	RR #2 Vernon; Orwell PE	46°09′24″N 62°50′02″W	Prince Edward Island (4591)		
Park Corner Pioneer Roman Catholic Cemetery	Route 20; Park Corner PE	46°32′00″N 63°33′38″W	Prince Edward Island (10762)		Upload Photo
Port-la-Joye–Fort Amherst National Historic Site of Canada	Anchor Point; Rocky Point PE	46°11′39″N 63°08′20″W	Federal (4301)		More images
Portage Shore Pioneer Cemetery	Portage Road, Route 6 Brackley Point PE	46°24′33″N 63°13′02″W	Prince Edward Island (10796)		Upload Photo
Profitt Barn	1000 Burlington Road, Rte. 234; Long River PE	46°29′03″N 63°34′07″W	Prince Edward Island (18474)		Upload Photo
Quintin Court Fish House	370 Harbourview Drive; North Rustico PE	46°27′18″N 63°17′35″W	Prince Edward Island (20879)		Upload Photo
Ramsay Barn - Gallery 18	10686 Rte. 6 New London PE	46°27′50″N 63°30′51″W	Prince Edward Island (20267)		Upload Photo
River Crest Acres Barn	188 Clyde River Road; Clyde River PE	46°11′52″N 63°16′22″W	Prince Edward Island (18702)		Upload Photo
Riverdale	157 Old Post Road; Crapaud PE	46°13′54″N 63°29′20″W	Prince Edward Island (20443)		Upload Photo
Major T.B. Rogers House	172 Stratford Road; Stratford PE	46°13′02″N 63°05′37″W	Prince Edward Island (15667)		Upload Photo
Roy House	20259 Route 2 Hazel Grove PE	46°22′03″N 63°22′45″W	Prince Edward Island (11475), Hazel Grove municipality (13945)		Upload Photo
3 Russell Street	3 Russell Street; Victoria PE	46°12′51″N 63°29′22″W	Prince Edward Island (6254)		Upload Photo
9 Russell Street	9 Russell Street; Victoria PE	46°12′52″N 63°29′23″W	Prince Edward Island (5681)		Upload Photo
23 Russell Street	23 Russell Street; Victoria PE	46°12′55″N 63°29′25″W	Prince Edward Island (6255)		Upload Photo
St. Augustine's Roman Catholic Church	2190 Church Road, Route 243; South Rustico PE	46°25′25″N 63°17′04″W	Prince Edward Island (1831)		More images
St. James United Church	3534 Black River Road; Covehead PE	46°23′37″N 63°08′58″W	Prince Edward Island (15182), Covehead municipality (18722)		Upload Photo
St. Joachim's Roman Catholic Church	5364 Rte. 3 Vernon River PE	46°12′15″N 62°51′00″W	Prince Edward Island (18477)		Upload Photo
St. Joachim's Waterside Pioneer Cemetery	Waterside Road; Pownal PE	46°11′34″N 62°57′24″W	Prince Edward Island (16082)		Upload Photo
St. John the Evangelist Anglican Church	391 Nelson Street; Victoria PE	46°13′44″N 63°29′48″W	Prince Edward Island (6250)		Upload Photo
St. John's Presbyterian Church	2794 Garfield Road - Route 207; Belfast PE	46°04′42″N 62°52′42″W	Prince Edward Island (15790)		Upload Photo
St. Martin of Tours Roman Catholic Church	3961 Route 19; Cumberland PE	46°10′06″N 63°10′06″W	Prince Edward Island (20087)		Upload Photo
St. Mary's Acadian School	5511 Millvale Road - Route 231; St. Ann PE	46°25′10″N 63°22′49″W	Prince Edward Island (15186)		Upload Photo
St. Michael's Parish House	1963 Iona Road, Route 206; Iona PE	46°05′45″N 62°49′00″W	Prince Edward Island (1829)		Upload Photo
Scotchfort Pioneer Cemetery	Highway 2 Scotchfort PE	46°21′11″N 62°54′39″W	Prince Edward Island (12282)		Upload Photo
The "Seagull"	27 Water Street; Victoria PE	46°12′48″N 63°29′26″W	Prince Edward Island (1616)		Upload Photo
Shaw's Hotel National Historic Site of Canada	Brackley PE	46°25′29″N 63°11′00″W	Federal (12974)		Upload Photo
Simpson Farm, Main House	Cavendish PE	46°29′33″N 63°23′27″W	Federal (10400)		Upload Photo
Margaret and Gordon Smith Home	4315, Route 13; Hunter River PE	46°21′22″N 63°20′56″W	Prince Edward Island (10381)		Upload Photo
Spurgeon Warren Field Cemetery	North Yorke Road - Route 248; Warren Grove PE	46°16′13″N 63°12′08″W	Prince Edward Island (11876)		Upload Photo
Stanhope by the Sea	41 Point Pleasant Crescent; Stanhope PE	46°25′26″N 63°08′42″W	Prince Edward Island (5368)		Upload Photo
Stanley Bridge School	4889 St. Mary's Road; Stanley Bridge PE	46°27′40″N 63°27′15″W	Prince Edward Island (20524)		Upload Photo
John W. Stewart House	85 Stratford Road; Stratford PE	46°13′22″N 63°06′18″W	Prince Edward Island (10575)		Upload Photo
Strathgartney Homestead Cemetery	Strathgartney Homestead; Strathgartney PE	46°12′41″N 63°20′36″W	Prince Edward Island (10633)		Upload Photo
Strathgartney Homestead National Historic Site of Canada	Bonshaw PE	46°12′N 63°21′W	Federal (7764)		Upload Photo
Tower	Point Prim Light Station; Point Prim PE	46°03′21″N 63°01′44″W	Federal (2078, (20720), Prince Edward Island (19727)		More images
Tower and Fog Alarm	Wood Islands Provincial Park; Wood Islands PE	45°56′59″N 62°44′47″W	Federal (9768), Prince Edward Island (19722)		More images
Townsend Burial Plot	Campbell's Pond - Route 20; Park Corner PE	46°32′07″N 63°32′36″W	Prince Edward Island (13038)		Upload Photo
Tryon United Church National Historic Site of Canada	Highway 10; Crapaud PE	46°14′23″N 63°29′58″W	Federal (12010)		Upload Photo
Uigg Baptist Church	5193 Murray Harbour Road, Route 24; Uigg PE	46°10′40″N 62°49′26″W	Prince Edward Island (1633)		Upload Photo
Uigg Pioneer Cemetery	Route 24 - Murray Harbour Road; Kinross PE	46°09′37″N 62°48′38″W	Prince Edward Island (12779)		Upload Photo
Uigg School	4894 Murray Harbour Road, Route 24; Uigg PE	46°09′58″N 62°48′53″W	Prince Edward Island (1758)		Upload Photo
Victoria Community Hall	20 Howard Street; Victoria PE	46°12′54″N 63°29′28″W	Prince Edward Island (7431)		More images
Victoria Rose Farmstead	824, Route 116; Victoria PE	46°12′54″N 63°30′01″W	Prince Edward Island (10561)		Upload Photo
Victoria School	730 Victoria Road, Rte. 116; Victoria PE	46°13′00″N 63°29′41″W	Prince Edward Island (21014)		Upload Photo
Victoria United Church	106 Nelson Street; Victoria PE	46°13′04″N 63°29′35″W	Prince Edward Island (5682)		Upload Photo
The Victoria Village Inn	22 Howard Street; Victoria PE	46°12′53″N 63°29′29″W	Prince Edward Island (7432)		Upload Photo
The Walsh Home	19 Welsh's Lane; Mount Stewart PE	46°21′50″N 62°51′53″W	Prince Edward Island (12109)		Upload Photo
James Warren Field Cemetery	67 Mill Road; Warren Grove PE	46°16′16″N 63°12′46″W	Prince Edward Island (10621)		Upload Photo
22 Water Street	22 Water Street; Victoria PE	46°12′49″N 63°29′27″W	Prince Edward Island (6261)		Upload Photo
Wellington MacNeill House	95 Georgetown Road; Stratford PE	46°12′42″N 63°04′02″W	Prince Edward Island (15221)		Upload Photo
West River Petroglyph Site	Wooded area off Green Road; Bonshaw PE	46°12′20″N 63°21′09″W	Prince Edward Island (20881)		Upload Photo
Winsloe South United Church	832 Winsloe Road, Route 223; South Winsloe PE	46°19′33″N 63°11′18″W	Prince Edward Island (1638)		Upload Photo
Wood Drying Kiln	4373, Route 13; Hunter River PE	46°21′31″N 63°20′52″W	Prince Edward Island (10363)		Upload Photo
Wood Islands Women's Institute Hall	822 Trans Canada Highway, Route 1 Wood Islands PE	45°58′02″N 62°47′07″W	Prince Edward Island (3356)		Upload Photo
Wood Islands Pioneer Cemetery	Pioneer Cemetery Road; Wood Islands West PE	45°57′44″N 62°46′55″W	Prince Edward Island (12872)		Upload Photo
Wright's Back Range Light	Birch Point Road; Victoria PE	46°12′28″N 63°30′15″W	Prince Edward Island (20480)		
Wright's Front Range Light	Beach Light Road; Victoria PE	46°12′16″N 63°29′47″W	Prince Edward Island (20482)		Upload Photo
Yankee Hill Farm House	55 Straight Road; Park Corner PE	46°30′36″N 63°29′23″W	Prince Edward Island (18638)		Upload Photo
York Point Community Centre	346 York Point Road; Cornwall PE	46°14′00″N 63°10′27″W	Prince Edward Island (20668)		Upload Photo

== See also ==
- List of historic places in Prince Edward Island
- List of National Historic Sites of Canada in Prince Edward Island
- Heritage Places Protection Act
