= Old Princetown Road =

Old Princetown Road (also known as Old Malpeque Road or simply Malpeque Road) is an historic colonial road in the Canadian province of Prince Edward Island. Dating to at least 1771, the approximately 59-kilometre (37 mi) road was an important inland commercial and military route connecting the town of Princetown or Malpeque with the colonial capital at Charlottetown. A large part of the former road is now in use as Route 2 between Charlottetown and Hunter River, while other parts remain as gravel roads or dirt paths, and some portions have been replaced entirely by farmland. A short section near South Granville is listed on the Canadian Register of Historic Places.

== Route description ==
The road began in Charlottetown at an intersection with Euston and Great George streets, bearing north. It passed through suburbs north of Charlottetown, curving around the York River (now North River) and bearing to the west through Milton then north-west through Hunter River. The road continued on nearly the same bearing past Hazel Grove, South Granville, Graham's Road, Clinton and Margate. West of Margate the road turned north again, bearing directly for Princetown. The road terminated at Brander's Road (now Route 103), at the southern boundary of Prince Royalty.

== History ==
The road was first envisioned by French colonial leaders around 1733. The British took control of the colony in 1758 following the Seven Years' War, and quickly recognized the importance of an inland route between the county seats of Princetown and Charlottetown. Work on improving the French road began in 1771.

In 1797, Colonel Joseph Robinson's orders to muster were ignored by the Prince County Regiment, based in Princetown. On the morning of September 5, Lieutenant-Governor Edmund Fanning marched the Princetown Road with a force of volunteers from Charlottetown to put down the insurrection. This event became known in local lore as the Siege of Malpeque.

The original road was surveyed through hilly and challenging terrain. Complaints that the road needed to be modified led to a new road being surveyed in 1825. The New Princetown Road diverted west from Hazel Grove to Fredericton, then turned north-west through Springfield and Summerfield to Kensington. At Kensington the road turned north to Malpeque. The new road later became Routes 2 and 20. After the new road opened in 1827, the original road fell into disuse.

== Current status ==
The road's original alignment is today known as University Avenue in Charlottetown. North-west of the city, the road is in use as Route 2 (Malpeque Road) as far as Hazel Brook. From there the road is known as Hazel Brook Road, a dirt road numbered Route 228, and Mill Road, an unmaintained dirt roadway. At Warburton Road, Mill Road becomes Old Princetown Road, which continues to Route 231 (Millvale Road). Here the road is interrupted, the portion further north having been replaced by farmland.

At South Granville the road resumes, in the form of a 1.5-kilometre (0.93 mi) dirt hiking trail through a scenic area known as the Devil's Punchbowl. On December 12, 2008, the trail was added to the Canadian Register of Historic Places. The road then continues as Princetown Road for 6.5 kilometres (4.0 mi), where it is interrupted by the Red Sands Golf Course.

North of Red Sands, the former road is in use as Route 6 for 2.6 kilometres (1.6 mi), then a short section of Thompson Point Road, then Route 104 for another 4.0 kilometres (2.5 mi). Old Princetown Road diverts from Route 104 and continues another 5.0 kilometres (3.1 mi) to Route 103 outside Malpeque Bay.
