= Avonlea (Anne of Green Gables) =

Fictional community from Lucy Maud Montgomery novels

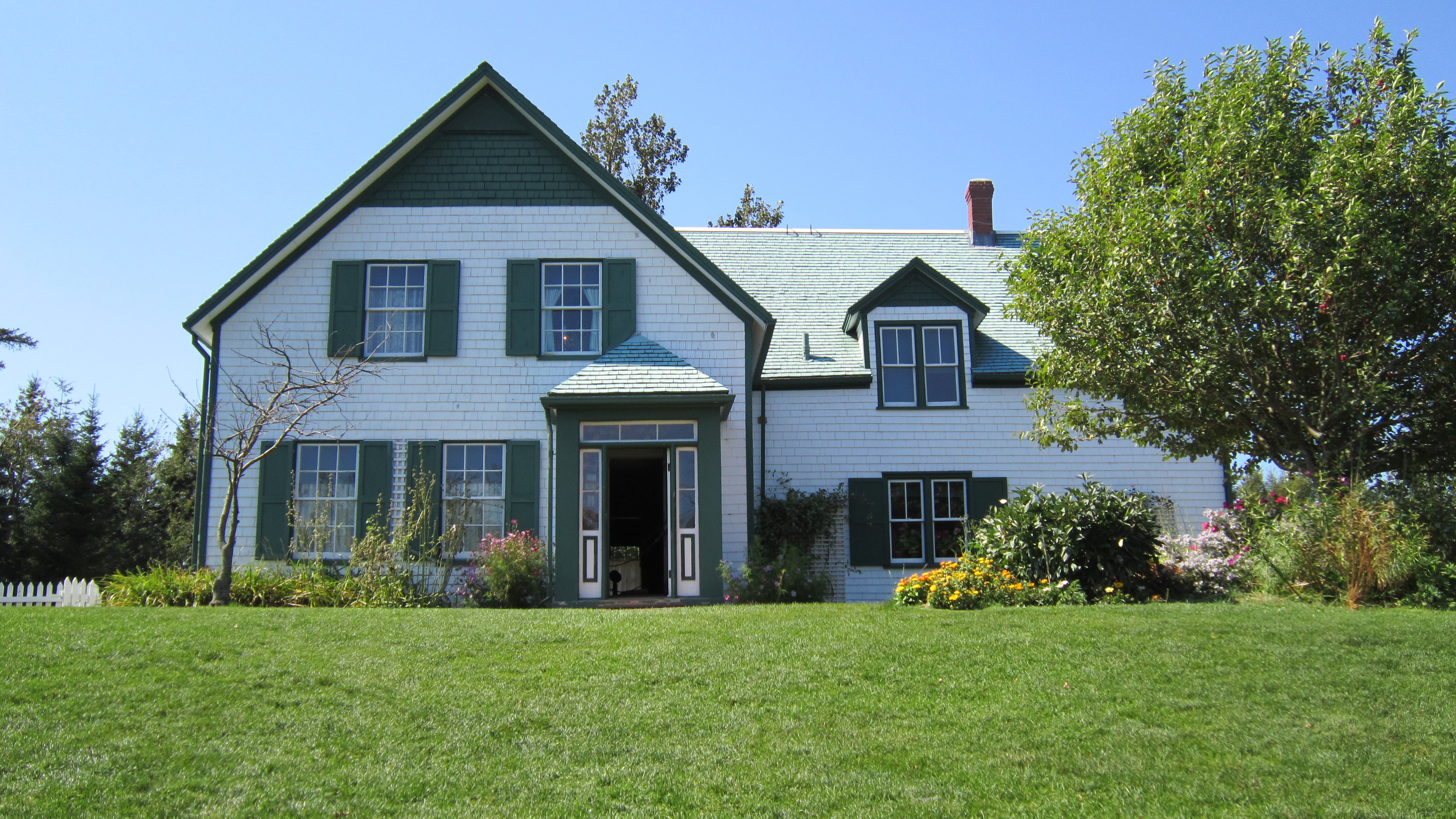
Green Gables Heritage Place, Cavendish, Prince Edward Island, Canada

Avonlea (/ævɒnˈliː/; av-on-LEE) is a fictional community located on Prince Edward Island, Canada, and is the setting of Lucy Maud Montgomery's 1908 novel Anne of Green Gables, following the adventures of Anne Shirley, as well as its sequels, and the television series Road to Avonlea and Anne with an E.

== Geography ==
In Montgomery's works, Avonlea is located on the northern shore of Prince Edward Island on a small peninsula. Neighbouring fictional communities include Carmody, White Sands (not to be confused with the modern White Sands, which is on the southern edge of Prince Edward Island), Grafton, Bright River, Newbridge, and Spencervale.

== Analysis ==
Montgomery's books contain numerous detailed descriptions of Avonlea and its rural environment.

Montgomery drew much of her inspiration for Avonlea from her childhood experiences in the late 19th century farming communities surrounding Cavendish, New Glasgow, New London, Hunter River, and Park Corner on Prince Edward Island. That connection became known as early as late 1920s, leading to the increase of tourism in the Cavendish region.

Irene Gammel argued that "Avonlea, far from being an idyllic and innocent pastoral space, is a highly contested and litigated arena in which passions about the appropriate representations of Montgomery's name and legacy run high". E. Holly Pike likewise noted that Avonlea's pastroral and romantic settings led to it becoming a "site of an idealized past". Janice Fiamengo wrote that "it is not an exaggeration to see Avonlea as another of the foundations of Canadian identity", she further noted that Avonlea is a "cultural myth", a "myth of Avonlea" (in similar context, Jeanette Lynes used the term nationalistic "Avonlea's mythology"), combining physical landscape with "past time when authentic relationships with the land were possible", called by Aspasia Kotsopoulous" "a nostalgic, sanitized vision of pastness"; all of this has contributed to the popularity of Canadian adaptations of Montgomery's work featuring this setting.

== Legacy ==
The popularity of Avonlea had led to its commodification, with various Avonlea-themed products (or more broadly, Anne of Green Gables-themed ones), from tourist memorabilia, toys, clothing to food products, marketed by companies such Avonlea Traditions Inc.. Outside Canada, an Avonlea-themed park, called Canadian World, was built in Ashibetsu, Hokkaido, Japan (Avonlea replica, including that of Green Gables farmhouse, was its major element).

Some adaptations of Montgomery work cut down her descriptions of Avonlea; for example, this was done in Paul Ledoux's stage play Anne (1998).
