= Prince Edward Island Route 15 =

Highway in Prince Edward Island, Canada

Route 15
- Brackley Point Road

Route information
- Maintained by Prince Edward Island Transportation and Public Works
- Length: 18.2 km (11.3 mi)

Major junctions
- South end: Route 1 (TCH) / Route 2 / Charlottetown Perimeter Highway
- Route 6
- North end: Gulf Shore Parkway

Location
- Country: Canada
- Province: Prince Edward Island
- Counties: Queens
- Major cities: Charlottetown

Highway system
- Provincial highways in Prince Edward Island
← Route 14	→ Route 16

Prince Edward Island Route 15 is a secondary highway in central Prince Edward Island.

Route 15 follows Brackley Point Road beginning at the junction with the Charlottetown Perimeter Highway (Trans-Canada Highway, Route 1). The route passes near the Charlottetown Airport, then proceeds north through the community of Brackley Beach. It is co-signed with Route 6 for 2.5 kilometres (1.6 mi) south of Brackley Beach. Route 15 terminates at the north shore, turning east and becoming the un-numbered Gulf Shore Parkway.

Until the 1990s, Route 15 began at an intersection with Route 2 (St. Peters Road) in Charlottetown, 2 kilometres (1.2 mi) south of the current terminus. When the Charlottetown Perimeter Highway was constructed, Route 2 was reassigned to the new road, and the Route 15 designation was dropped from Brackley Point Road south of the new ring road.

== Major intersections ==
The entire route is in Queens County.

Location	km	mi	Destinations	Notes
Charlottetown	−2.0	−1.2	St. Peters Road (former Route 2)	Former southern terminus
Charlottetown	0.0	0.0	Route 1 (TCH) / Route 2 (Perimeter Highway) – Borden-Carleton, Summerside, Wood Islands, Souris	Southern terminus
Charlottetown	1.2	0.75	Sherwood Road – Charlottetown Airport	Roundabout
Brackley	2.4	1.5	Route 221 north (Union Road)	
Brackley	5.2	3.2	Route 220 (Horne Cross Road)	
Harrington	10.4	6.5	Route 250 (Kentyre Road / Kilkenny Road)	Intersections offset; 40 m (130 ft) concurrency
Brackley Point	12.9	8.0	Route 6 (Black River Road) – Stanhope	South end of Route 6 concurrency
Brackley Beach	15.4	9.6	Route 6 west (Portage Road) – Oyster Bed Bridge, North Rustico	North end of Route 6 concurrency
Prince Edward Island National Park	18.2	11.3	Gulf Shore Parkway	Northern terminus; roadway continues east
1.000 mi = 1.609 km; 1.000 km = 0.621 mi: Concurrency terminus; Route transition
