= Prince Edward Island Route 8 =

Highway in Prince Edward Island, Canada

Route 8

Route information
- Maintained by Prince Edward Island Transportation and Public Works
- Length: 21.5 km (13.4 mi)

Major junctions
- West end: Route 1A
- Route 2
- East end: Route 6 / Route 20

Location
- Country: Canada
- Province: Prince Edward Island
- Counties: Prince, Queens

Highway system
- Provincial highways in Prince Edward Island
← Route 7	→ Route 9

Prince Edward Island Route 8 is a 21.5 km (13.4 mi) secondary highway in central Prince Edward Island, Canada.

Route 8 begins at Route 1A south of Summerside, as Freetown Road. The road proceeds east to Route 2 in Summerfield, where Freetown Road ends. Route 8 is then signed concurrently with Route 2 for 150 metres (490 ft) before continuing east as Graham's Road. The road continues northeast to Route 6 in New London, where the Route 8 designation ends. Graham's Road then continues as Route 20.
