= Prince Edward Island Route 16 =

Highway in Prince Edward Island, Canada

Route 16
- East Point Road; Northside Road

Route information
- Maintained by the Department of Transportation, Infrastructure, and Energy
- Length: 75.5 km (46.9 mi)

Major junctions
- East end: Route 2 / Macphee Avenue in Souris
- Route 16A in South Lake; Route 16A in North Lake
- West end: Route 2 / Route 313 in St. Peters Bay

Location
- Country: Canada
- Province: Prince Edward Island
- Counties: Kings

Highway system
- Provincial highways in Prince Edward Island
← Route 15	→ Route 17

Route 16 is a 75 km (47 mi), two-lane, uncontrolled-access, secondary highway in eastern Prince Edward Island. Its eastern terminus is at Route 2 and Macphee Avenue in Souris and its western terminus is at Route 313 in Saint Peters Bay. The route is entirely in Kings County.

== Route description ==
The route begins at its eastern terminus and heads northeast before curving westward in East Point. It continues west until Cable Head, where it curves south before ending at its western terminus.

== Major intersections ==
County	Location	km	mi	Junction	Notes
Kings County	Souris	0.0	0.0	Route 2 / Macphee Avenue	
Kings County	Red Point	8.7	5.4	Route 302	
Kings County	South Lake	14.1	8.8	Route 301	
Kings County	South Lake	17.3	10.7	Route 16A	
Kings County	North Lake	29.7	18.5	Route 16A	
Kings County	North Lake	30.8	19.1	Route 301	
Kings County	Campbells Cove	34.1	21.2	Route 303	
Kings County	Priest Pond	39.0	24.2	Route 302	
Kings County	Hermanville	46.8	29.1	Route 305	
Kings County	Hermanville	51.3	31.9	Route 306	
Kings County	Saint Margarets	55.0	34.2	Route 307	
Kings County	Naufrage	58.0	36.0	Route 308	
Kings County	Monticello	62.0	38.5	Route 309	
Kings County	Cable Head East	70.4	43.7	Route 336	
Kings County	St. Peters Bay	75.0	46.6	Route 313	Route 313 concurrency begins
Kings County	St. Peters Bay	75.5	46.9	Route 2 / Route 313	Route 313 concurrency ends

== Route 16A ==
Route 16A
- Location: South Lake-North Lake
- Length: 4.0 km (2.5 mi)

Route 16A, also known as Elmira Road, is a four-kilometre (2.5 mi), two-lane, uncontrolled-access, secondary highway in eastern Prince Edward Island. Its southern terminus is at Route 16 in South Lake and its northern terminus is at Route 16 in North Lake. It is a suffixed highway of Route 16 and is located completely in Kings County.
