= Prince Edward Island Route 20 =

Highway in Prince Edward Island, Canada

Route 20

Route information
- Maintained by the Department of Transportation, Infrastructure, and Energy
- Length: 32.3 km (20.1 mi)

Major junctions
- West end: Route 2 / Route 6 in Kensington
- Route 104 in Indian River; Route 103 / Route 104 in Malpeque; Route 102 in Darnley; Route 103 in Sea View; Route 101 in Park Corner; Route 262 in Park Corner; Route 263 in French River; Route 234 in Long River; Route 262 in Long River
- East end: Route 6 / Route 8 in New London

Location
- Country: Canada
- Province: Prince Edward Island
- Counties: Prince, Queens

Highway system
- Provincial highways in Prince Edward Island
← Route 19A	→ Route 21

Route 20 is a 32.3 km (20.1 mi), two-lane, uncontrolled-access, secondary highway in Prince Edward Island. Its western terminus is at Route 2 and Route 6 in Kensington and its eastern terminus is at Route 6 and Route 8 in New London. The route is located in Prince and Queens counties.

== Route description ==
The route begins at its western terminus and heads north to Malpeque, where it turns right. It crosses the Baltic River, heads east, crosses the county line, and curves south near French River. It crosses the Southwest River and ends at its eastern terminus.
