= Hunter River =

Hunter River may refer to:

- Hunter River (New South Wales), Australia
- Hunter River (Western Australia)
- Hunter River, New Zealand
- Hunter River (Prince Edward Island), Canada
  - Hunter River, Prince Edward Island, community on Hunter River, Canada
