= Prince Edward Island Route 7 =

Two-lane highway in Prince Edward Island, Canada

Route 7
- Rustico Road
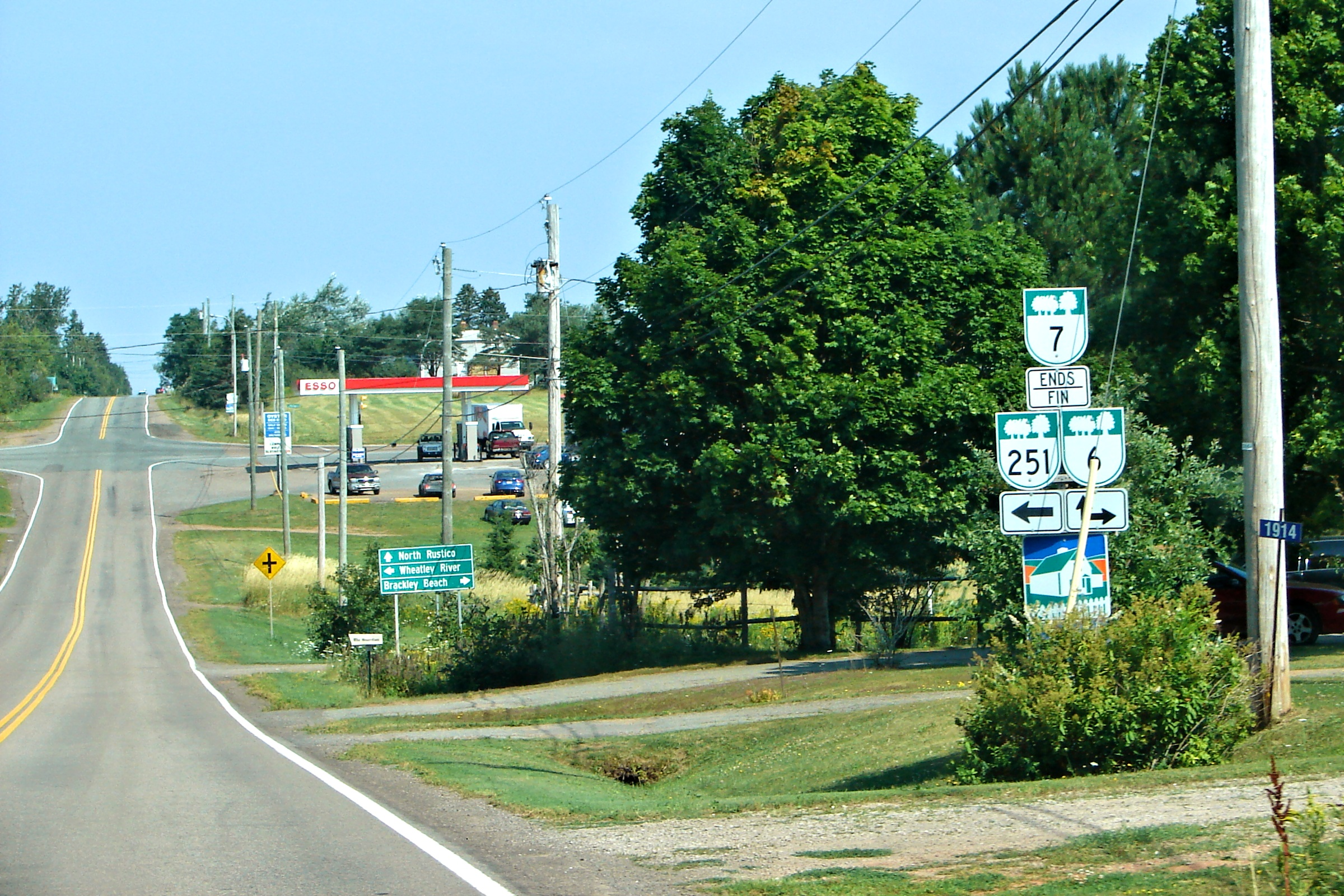

Route information
- Maintained by Prince Edward Island Transportation and Public Works
- Length: 9.9 km (6.2 mi)

Major junctions
- South end: Route 2 near Charlottetown
- North end: Route 6 at Oyster Bed Bridge

Location
- Country: Canada
- Province: Prince Edward Island
- Counties: Queens

Highway system
- Provincial highways in Prince Edward Island
← Route 6	→ Route 8

Prince Edward Island Route 7 is a secondary highway in central Prince Edward Island. The short connecting route begins at an intersection with Route 2 west of Charlottetown, and runs north to Oyster Bed Bridge, where the road continues as Route 6. It is an uncontrolled, paved two-lane road for its entire length.

== Major intersections ==
The entire route is in Queens County.

Location	km	mi	Destinations	Notes
Milton Station	0.0	0.0	Route 2 – Summerside, Charlottetown	Southern terminus
North Milton	2.0	1.2	Route 256 (Crabbe Road / MacKenzie Road)	
North Milton	2.5	1.6	Route 224 west (New Glasgow Road) – New Glasgow	
Oyster Bed Bridge	9.9	6.2	Route 6 / Route 251 west (Crooked Creek Road) – North Rustico, Cavendish, Brackley Beach, Wheatley River	Roundabout; northern terminus
1.000 mi = 1.609 km; 1.000 km = 0.621 mi
