= Prince Edward Island Route 25 =

Highway in Prince Edward Island, Canada

Route 25

Route information
- Maintained by the Department of Transportation, Infrastructure, and Energy
- Length: 18.0 km (11.2 mi)

Major junctions
- South end: Route 2 in Marshfield
- Route 220 in York; Route 25A in North Shore; Route 6 in Covehead; Route 6 in Stanhope
- North end: Gulf Shore Parkway East in Stanhope by the Sea

Location
- Country: Canada
- Province: Prince Edward Island

Highway system
- Provincial highways in Prince Edward Island
| ← Route 24 | → Route 26 |

Route 25 is a 18-kilometre (11 mi), two-lane, uncontrolled-access, secondary highway in central Prince Edward Island. Its southern terminus is at Route 2 in Marshfield, and its northern terminus is at Gulf Shore Parkway East in Stanhope by the Sea. The route is entirely in Queens County.

== Route description ==
The route begins at its southern terminus and heads north. It joins with Route 6 in Covehead and turns left later in Stanhope to leave the concurrency. It then heads northwest through Stanhope by the Sea where the route ends at its northern terminus.

== Route 25A ==
Route 25A
- Location: North Shore-Covehead
- Length: 1.8 km (1.1 mi)

Route 25A, also known as West Covehead Road, is the suffixed route of Route 25. It is 1.8 kilometres (1.1 mi) long and runs between Route 25 in North Shore and Route 6 in Covehead. Route 25A is an unposted route number.
