= Naufrage, Prince Edward Island =

Locality in Prince Edward Island, Canada

Coordinates: 46.467°N 62.418°W

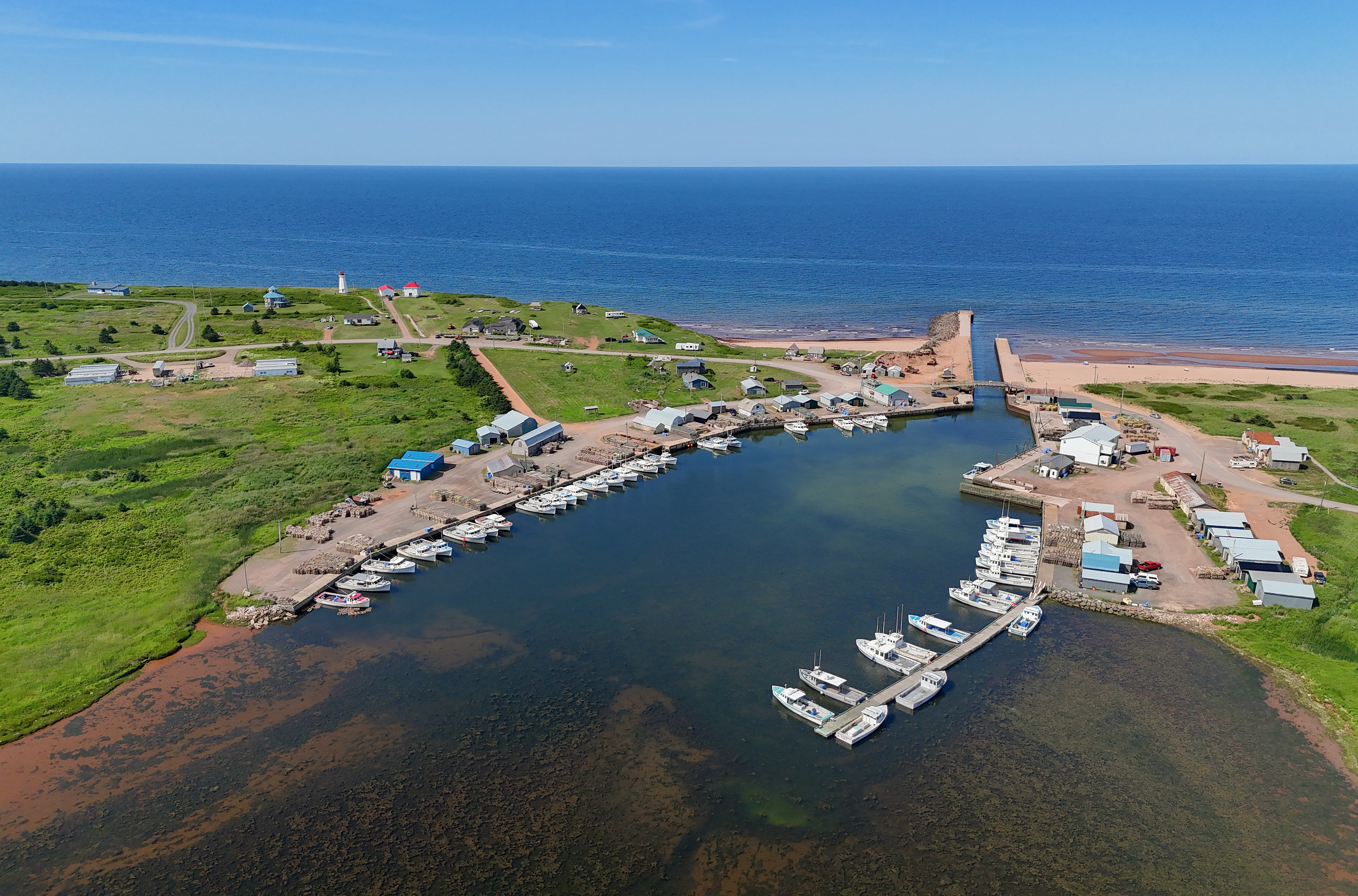
Aerial view

Naufrage is a community in Kings County, Prince Edward Island, Canada, in the northeast section of the province in Lot 43.

"Naufrage" is the French word for shipwreck. The name stems from the numerous shipwrecks that occurred in the area, starting with the arrival of European settlers in 1719.

Once a booming area of Irish Moss collection, Naufrage is known today for lobster and tuna fishing, and tourism.

== Settlement ==
Little is known about the early days of settlement in the Naufrage area. Prior to any French settlement there is evidence of Mi'Kmaq burial grounds near the Shipwreck Point Lighthouse. After French settlement due to shipwrecks, Scottish settlers arrived in 1771 and 1772. Apart from a cemetery on the west side of Naufrage harbour, little evidence remain of these earliest French residents.

== Shipwrecks ==
The name of the first French ship that brought settlers to the area is unknown today, and only its wreck date of 1719 remains. The Asia was lost off of Naufrage in 1839. Between November 1 and November 8, 1906, four vessels wrecked near the Shipwreck Point lighthouse. The Sovinto and the Orpheus were wrecked at Priest Pond, while the Olga sank at Black Bush (present-day Hermanville). The Turret Bell sank at Cable Head.

== Fishing and industry ==
Up until the middle of the 20th century, small scale fishing was done up and down the northern coast of the Prince Edward Island, with several vessels departing from 15 small ports. There were three lobster canneries located at Naufrage Harbour. Fisherman also caught, processed and cured herring, cod, mackerel, hake, and haddock. The canneries have closed, but Naufrage remains a popular place for lobster fishing, with over 100 boats fishing out of the harbour.

== Shipwreck Point Lighthouse ==
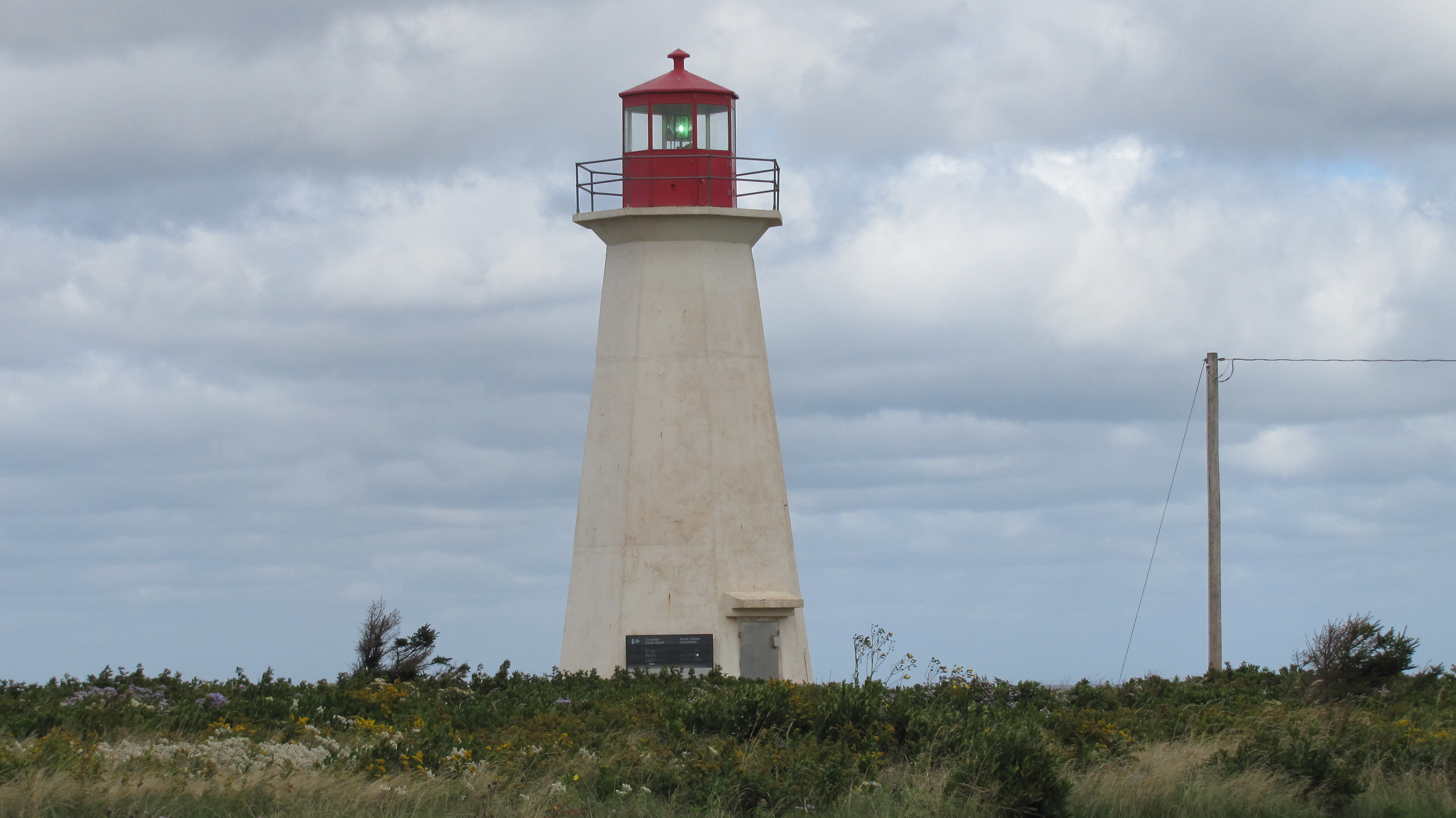
Shipwreck Point Lighthouse, overlooking Naufrage Harbour and the Gulf of St. Lawrence.

One notable feature of the Naufrage area is the Shipwreck Point Lighthouse. It was built in 1913 by the Anandale Lumber Company at a cost of $3,213.81 The original lighthouse was a square, two-storey structure that housed a fourth-order lens in its lantern room. The lower storeys provided living quarters for the lighthouse keeper and consisted of eight rooms. The lighthouse was painted white below, while the lens room was painted red. The first lighthouse keeper was Francis (Frank) MacKinnon. The lighthouse was 11.5m tall, and displayed a white flashing light.

In 1967, a new Shipwreck Point lighthouse was built slightly west of its original location, and its operation was automated. It is an octagonal tower, at a height of 13.5m. It is one of only two concrete lighthouses on the Island. The new Shipwreck Point lighthouse went into service on 27 September 1967. Its beacon exhibits a three-second flash followed by a two-second eclipse, a cycle that repeats every five seconds.

The original 1913 lighthouse is now privately owned.

== Naufrage today ==
Today Naufrage garners much attention as a tourist attraction during the summer months. It is home to the Shipwreck Point Cafe. Under a 2016 funding grant from the Government of Canada in partnership with ACOA, Naufrage received more than $76,000 to upgrade infrastructure at the harbour, including the addition of commercial kiosk (which currently is home to a small ice-cream shop), a shaded deck area which overlooks the beach, and public washrooms. In 2016 a renovation and expansion of the facilities at the Big Cape School was begun, providing similar amenities. As a part of this upgrade, the Red Rock Adventure Company was established to offer guided bike tours of the Naufrage area.
