= St. Peters Bay =

- Community
- Municipality of St. Peters Bay
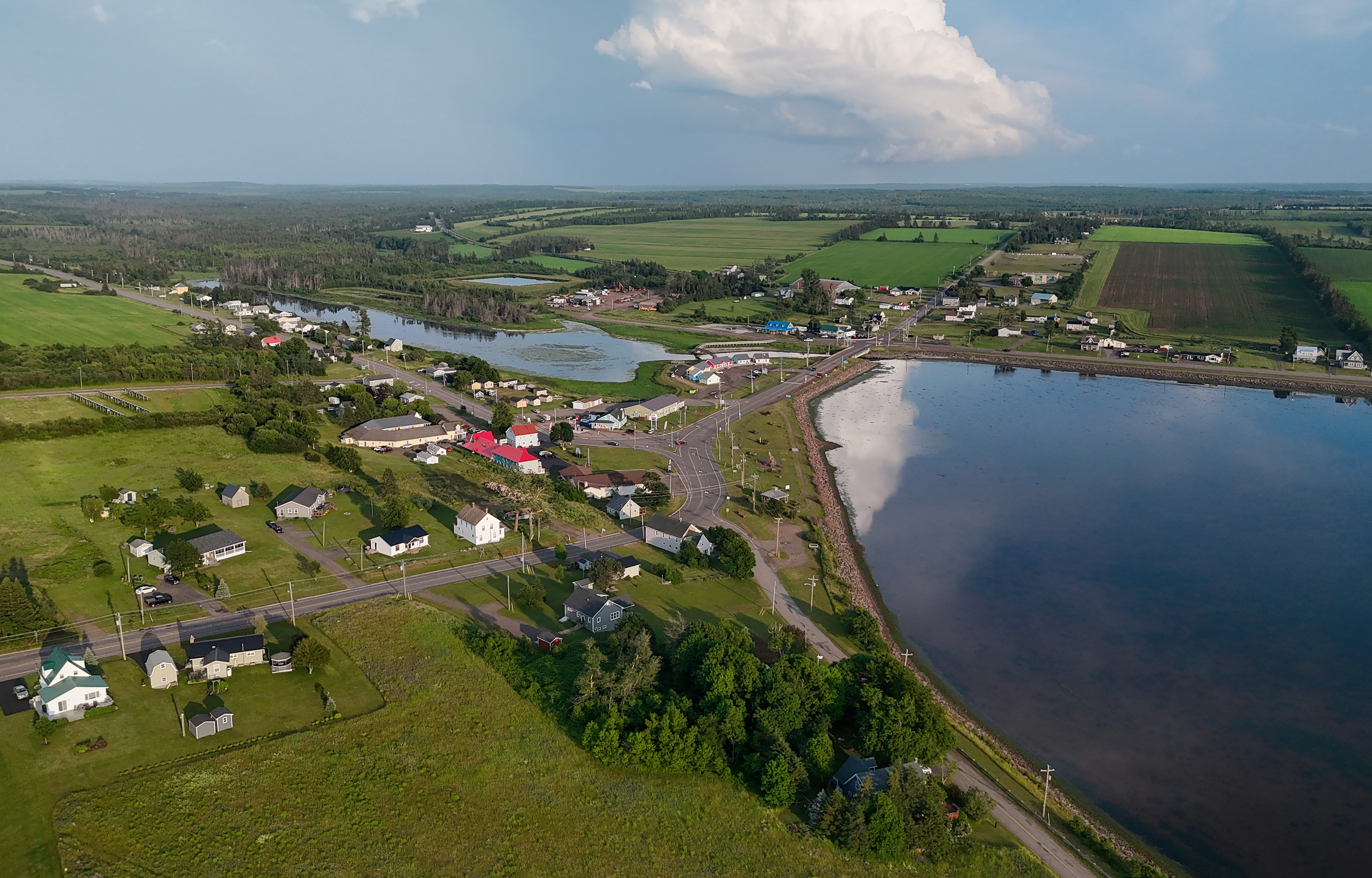

- St. Peters Bay in Prince Edward Island
- Coordinates: 46.417°N 62.581°W
- Country: Canada
- Province: Prince Edward Island
- County: Kings County
- Incorporated: 1953

Population (2011)
  - Total: 253
- Time zone: AST
  - Summer (DST): ADT
- Area code: 902
- Telephone Exchange: 961

St. Peters Bay is a municipality that holds community status in Prince Edward Island, Canada. It was incorporated in 1953. St. Peters Bay is well known for its annual Blueberry Festival and Parade, which draws in tourists and locals alike.

== Geography and climate ==
St. Peters Bay has a humid continental climate (Köppen Dfb). The average annual temperature in St. Peters Bay is 6.2 °C (43.2 °F). The average annual rainfall is 1,115.7 mm (43.93 in) with October as the wettest month. The temperatures are highest on average in July, at around 18.9 °C (66.0 °F), and lowest in February, at around −6.5 °C (20.3 °F). The highest temperature ever recorded in Maniwaki was 34.0 °C (93.2 °F) on 10 August 2001; the coldest temperature ever recorded was −34.5 °C (−30.1 °F) on 7 February 1993.

Climate data for St. Peters Bay Climate ID: 8300562; coordinates 46°27′01″N 62°34′33″W; elevation: 29.7 m (97 ft); WMO ID: 71310; 1991–2020 normals, extremes 1960–present
Month	Jan	Feb	Mar	Apr	May	Jun	Jul	Aug	Sep	Oct	Nov	Dec	Year
Record high humidex	21.1	14.5	24.8	27.8	33.6	38.4	39.9	39.0	38.4	35.5	25.8	21.7	39.9
Record high °C (°F)	17.8 (64.0)	14.8 (58.6)	23.6 (74.5)	26.4 (79.5)	31.5 (88.7)	33.0 (91.4)	33.3 (91.9)	34.0 (93.2)	33.0 (91.4)	27.5 (81.5)	22.0 (71.6)	17.9 (64.2)	34.0 (93.2)
Mean daily maximum °C (°F)	−2.1 (28.2)	−2.5 (27.5)	1.2 (34.2)	6.7 (44.1)	13.3 (55.9)	18.9 (66.0)	23.4 (74.1)	23.1 (73.6)	19.1 (66.4)	12.8 (55.0)	7.2 (45.0)	1.6 (34.9)	10.2 (50.4)
Daily mean °C (°F)	−6.0 (21.2)	−6.5 (20.3)	−2.5 (27.5)	2.8 (37.0)	8.6 (47.5)	14.3 (57.7)	18.9 (66.0)	18.8 (65.8)	14.9 (58.8)	9.2 (48.6)	3.9 (39.0)	−1.6 (29.1)	6.2 (43.2)
Mean daily minimum °C (°F)	−9.9 (14.2)	−10.5 (13.1)	−6.2 (20.8)	−1.1 (30.0)	3.9 (39.0)	9.6 (49.3)	14.4 (57.9)	14.4 (57.9)	10.8 (51.4)	5.7 (42.3)	0.7 (33.3)	−4.8 (23.4)	2.2 (36.0)
Record low °C (°F)	−30.0 (−22.0)	−34.5 (−30.1)	−27.8 (−18.0)	−16.1 (3.0)	−8.9 (16.0)	−3.9 (25.0)	1.7 (35.1)	0.0 (32.0)	−2.8 (27.0)	−7.5 (18.5)	−15.0 (5.0)	−25.0 (−13.0)	−34.5 (−30.1)
Record low wind chill	−39.0	−37.4	−30.9	−19.5	−9.1	−1.5	0.0	0.0	−1.8	−7.2	−21.1	−30.8	−39.0
Average precipitation mm (inches)	87.8 (3.46)	73.1 (2.88)	85.9 (3.38)	81.3 (3.20)	76.1 (3.00)	83.3 (3.28)	84.4 (3.32)	89.9 (3.54)	103.3 (4.07)	121.1 (4.77)	113.5 (4.47)	116.1 (4.57)	1,115.7 (43.93)
Average precipitation days (≥ 0.2 mm)	15.0	13.7	14.0	13.9	13.6	12.5	12.8	11.8	12.8	16.0	17.4	17.7	170.9
Average relative humidity (%) (at 1500 LST)	76.8	72.8	69.7	66.8	66.1	68.2	66.4	66.0	67.4	70.0	73.4	78.4	70.2
Source: Environment and Climate Change Canada

== Demographics ==
Federal census population history of St. Peters Bay
Year	Pop.	±%
1956	308	—
1961	321	+4.2%
1966	289	−10.0%
1971	370	+28.0%
1976	322	−13.0%
1981	335	+4.0%
1986	265	−20.9%
1991	284	+7.2%
1996	283	−0.4%
2001	267	−5.7%
2006	248	−7.1%
2011	253	+2.0%
2016	237	−6.3%
2021	231	−2.5%
Source: Statistics Canada

In the 2021 Census of Population conducted by Statistics Canada, St. Peters Bay had a population of 231 living in 111 of its 130 total private dwellings, a change of −2.5% from its 2016 population of 237. With a land area of 4.44 km^{2} (1.71 sq mi), it had a population density of 52.0/km^{2} (134.7/sq mi) in 2021.

== Attractions ==
- Confederation Trail
- St. Peter's Courthouse Theatre
- St. Peters Landing, shops that opened in 2005 after a major dredging and restructuring project surrounding the bay and the bridge

== Infrastructure ==
The community is served mainly by Prince Edward Island Route 2 and Prince Edward Island Route 16 with other areas of the province.

== See also ==
- List of communities in Prince Edward Island
