= Richmond, Prince Edward Island =

Locality in Prince Edward Island, Canada

Coordinates: 46.50800°N 63.99146°W

Location of Richmond within PEI

Richmond is a locality in the Canadian province of Prince Edward Island, located in Prince County.

Located in a farming area west of Summerside, the community is situated on Route 2 and until 1989 was served by CN Rail.
