= Harrington Research Farm =

Canadian agricultural research farm

Coordinates: 46.344105°N 63.162099°W

- Field of research: Agriculture
- Address: 1200 Brackley Point Road
- Location: Harrington, Prince Edward Island, Canada

The Harrington Research Farm is a government-run facility that is part of the Agriculture and Agri-Food Canada Charlottetown Research and Development Centre. Located in Harrington, Prince Edward Island, the farm's resources are focused on the advancement of Canadian agriculture.

== Potato research ==
PEI has long been an area of Canada that is known for growing quality island-grown potatoes. This has led to the potato industry investing in methods in which potatoes can grow better, and without disease. One disease in particular that was hampered the PEI potato producers in the past decade is the wire-worm. This spurred scientist Christine Noronha to create a wireworm trap which severely deterred the pest from affecting nearby potato crops.

== Organic research ==
Acreage at the facility has been certified organic, becoming the only research centre in Canada to do so.

== Location ==
The research farm is located north of Charlottetown on 1200 Brackley Point Road.
