= Lot 24, Prince Edward Island =

- Township
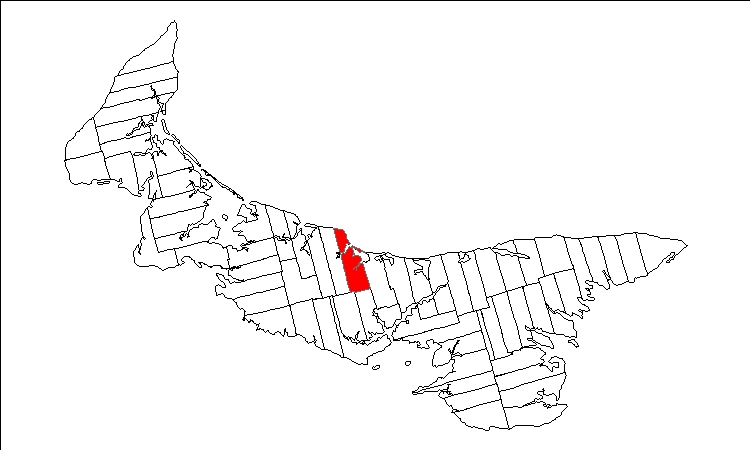
- Map of Prince Edward Island highlighting Lot 24
- Coordinates: 46°24′N 63°17′W
- Country: Canada
- Province: Prince Edward Island
- County: Queens County
- Parish: Charlotte Parish

Area
  - Total: 69.84 km^{2} (26.97 sq mi)

Population (2006)
  - Total: 1,572
  - Density: 22.5/km^{2} (58/sq mi)
- Time zone: UTC-4 (AST)
  - Summer (DST): UTC-3 (ADT)
- Canadian Postal code: C0A
- Area code: 902
- NTS Map: 011L06
- GNBC Code: BAERK

Lot 24 is a township in Queens County, Prince Edward Island, Canada. It is part of Charlotte Parish. Lot 24 was awarded to Charles Lee and Francis MacLeane in the 1767 land lottery. It was sold in arrears for quitrent in 1781 and a portion was granted to Loyalists in 1783.

== Communities ==
Incorporated municipalities:

- Miltonvale Park
- North Rustico
- Stanley Bridge, Hope River, Bayview, Cavendish and North Rustico

Civic address communities:

- Anglo Rustico
- Brookfield
- Cavendish
- Cymbria
- Ebenezer
- Greenvale
- Mayfield
- New Glasgow
- North Milton
- Oyster Bed
- Oyster Bed Bridge
- South Rustico
- Wheatley River
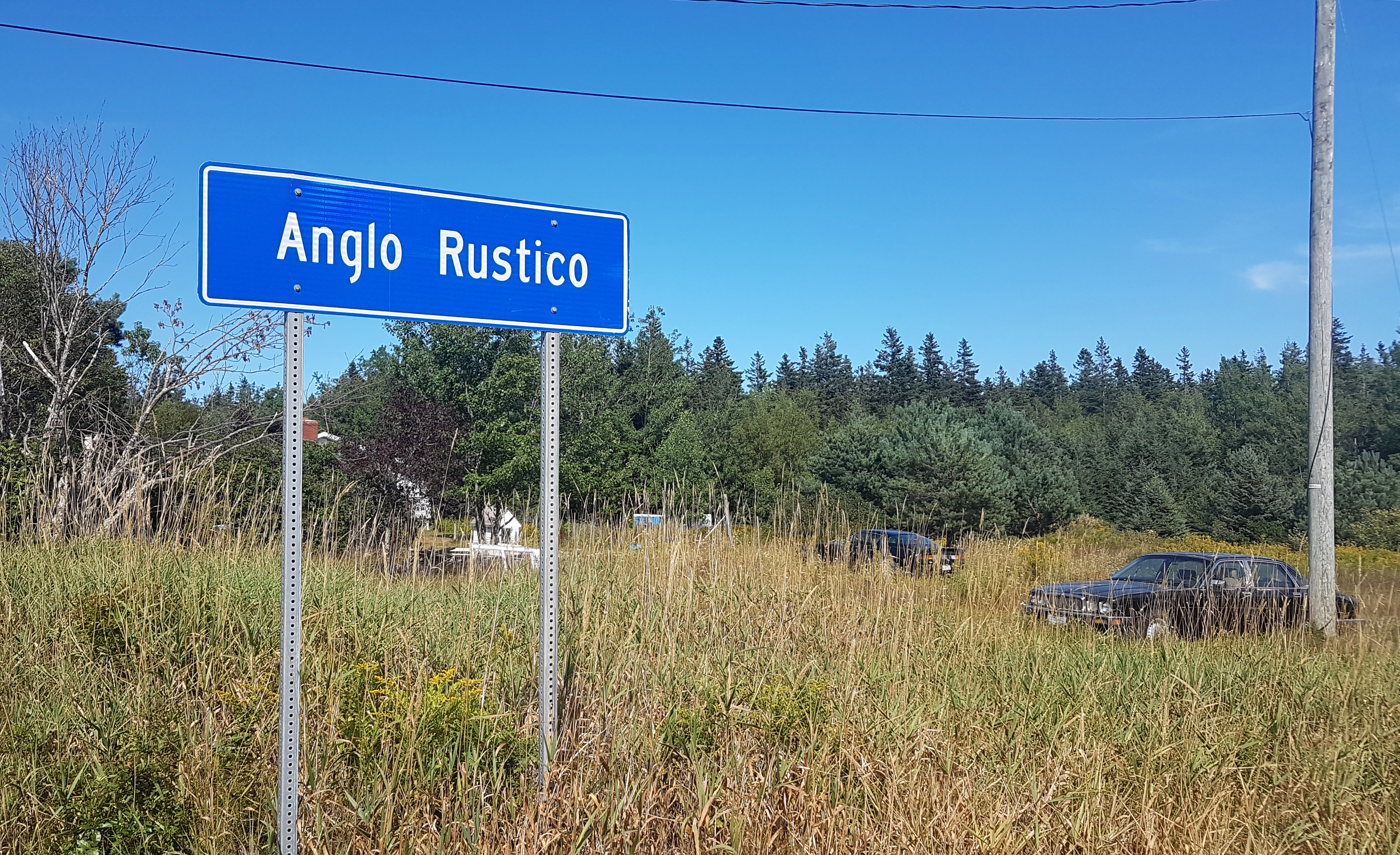
Anglo Rustico

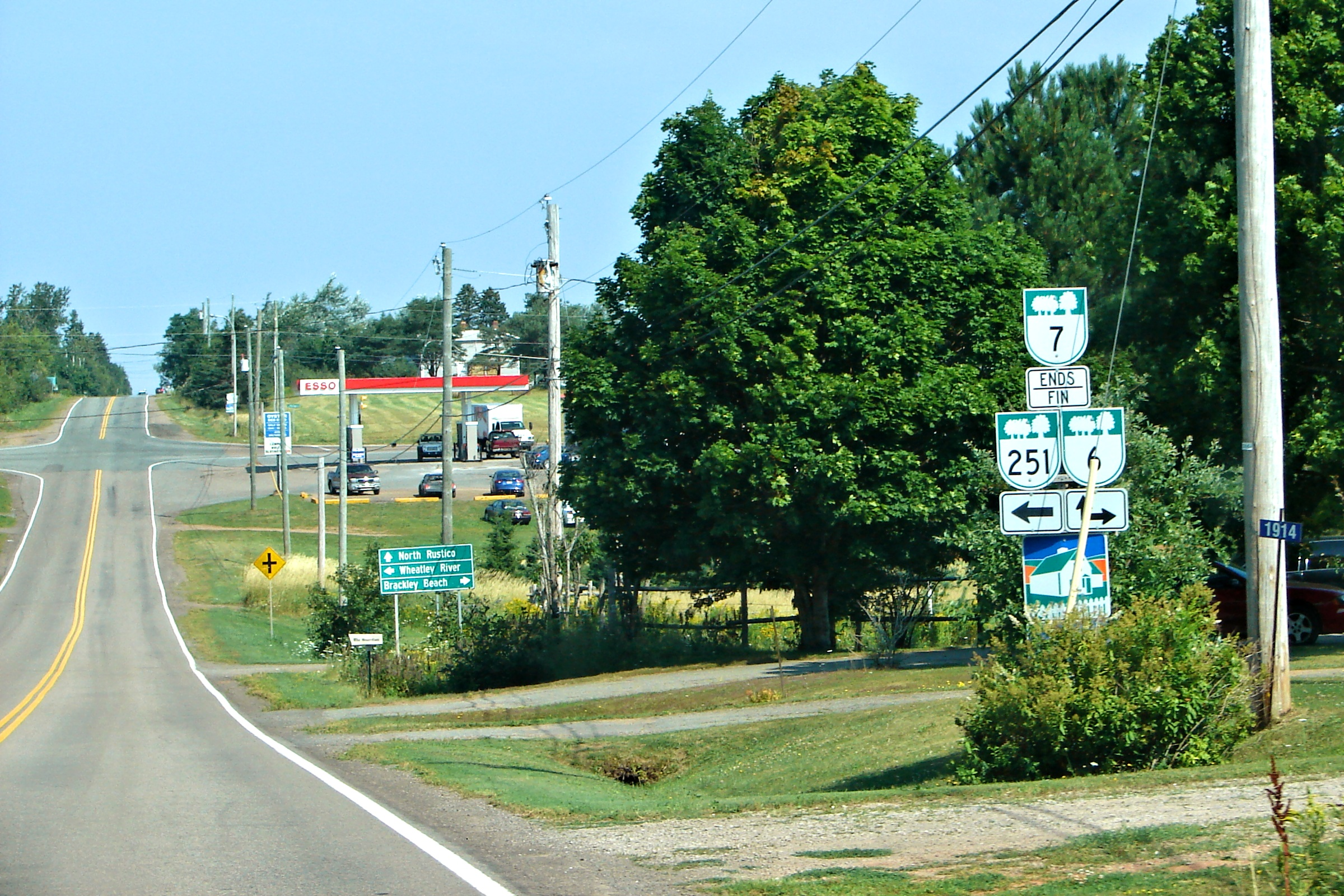
Oyster Bed Bridge

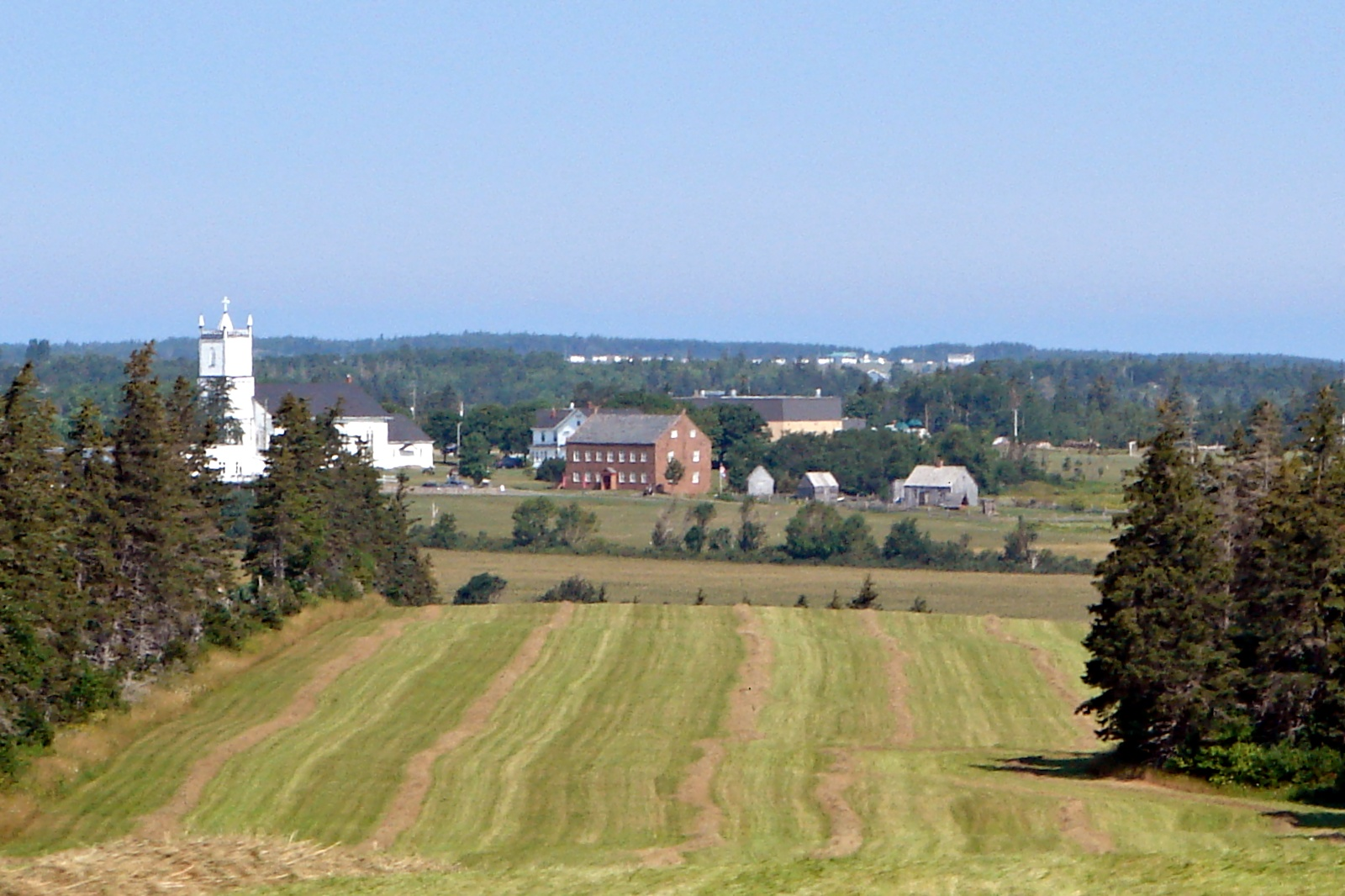
South Rustico

== Demographics ==
Historical population
Year	Pop.	±%
1871	2,356	—
1881	2,737	+16.2%
1891	2,615	−4.5%
1901	2,362	−9.7%
1911	2,192	−7.2%
1921	2,004	−8.6%
1931	1,827	−8.8%
1941	1,790	−2.0%
2006	1,572	−12.2%
