= Resort Municipality, Prince Edward Island =

Municipality in Prince Edward Island, Canada

Resort Municipality
- Resort municipality
- Resort Municipality of Stanley Bridge, Hope River, Bayview, Cavendish and North Rustico
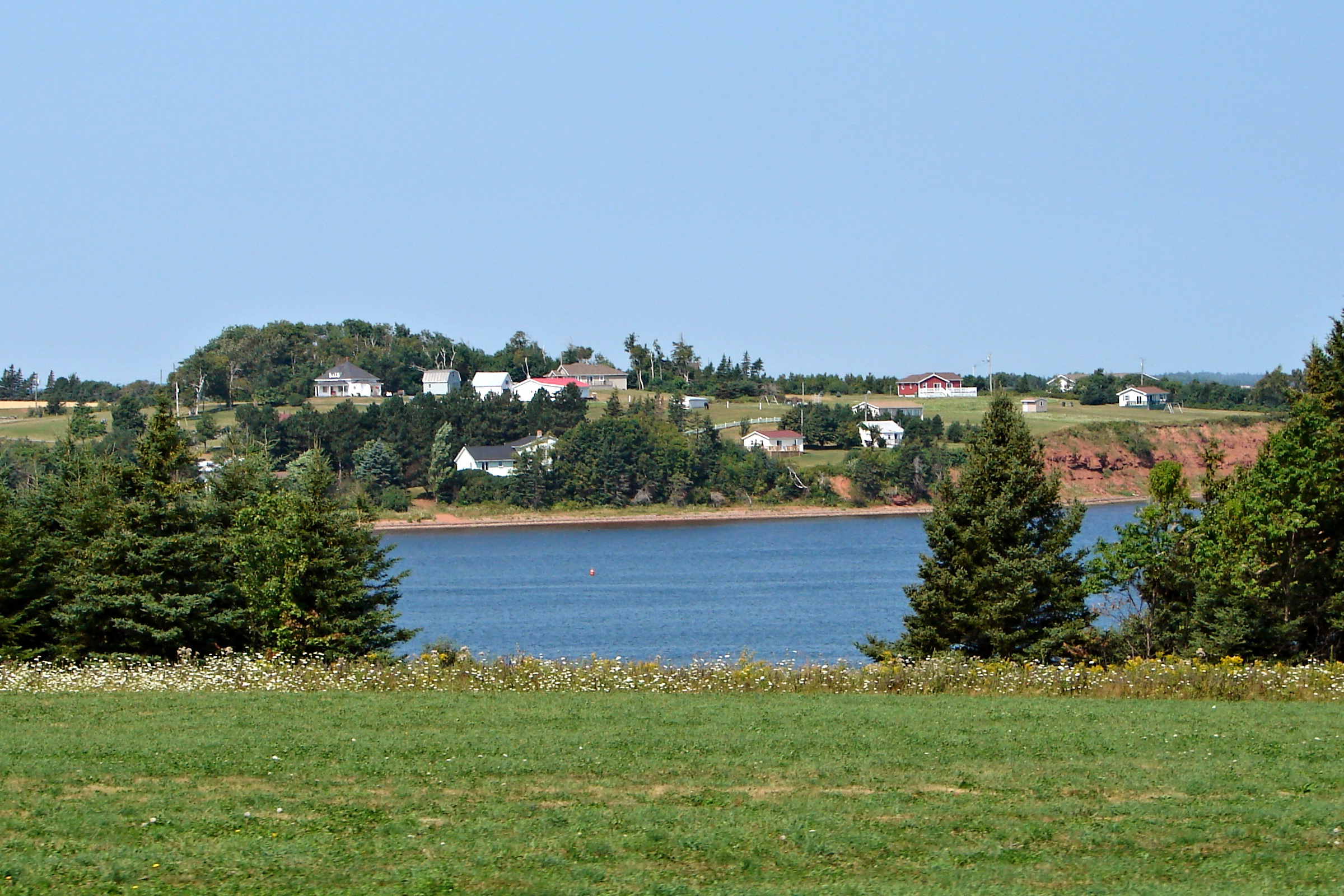
- Stanley Bridge

- Location within Prince Edward Island
- Coordinates: 46°29′N 63°23′W
- Country: Canada
- Province: Prince Edward Island
- County: Queens County
- Parish: Grenville, Charlotte
- Township: Lot 21, Lot 22, Lot 23, Lot 24
- Incorporated: 1990

Government
  - Type: Municipal Council
  - Chairperson: Matthew Jelley
  - Councillors: List: David Gauthier; Kay Hryckiw; Linda Lowther; Edmond Richard; Erna Watters; Gwen Wyand
  - CAO: Brenda MacDonald

Area
  - Total: 37.79 km^{2} (14.59 sq mi)

Population (2016)
  - Total: 328
  - Density: 8.7/km^{2} (23/sq mi)
- Time zone: UTC-4 (AST)
  - Summer (DST): UTC-3 (ADT)
- Canadian Postal code: C0A 1N0
- Area code: 902 (963 exchange)
- Website: Official website

Resort Municipality, officially named the Resort Municipality of Stanley Bridge, Hope River, Bayview, Cavendish and North Rustico, is a resort municipality in Prince Edward Island, Canada. It is the sole such municipality in the province. It was established in 1990.

== History ==
A rural resort area to the north and northwest of North Rustico, comprising several communities, was incorporated as the Resort Municipality of Stanley Bridge, Hope River, Bayview, Cavendish and North Rustico by order in council in 1990.

== Geography ==
Resort Municipality is located within Queens County approximately 35 km (22 mi) northwest of Charlottetown. It borders the Town of North Rustico and straddles several geographic levels in the province, including the townships of Lot 21, Lot 22, Lot 23 and Lot 24 as well as the parishes of Grenville and Charlotte.

Localities within Resort Municipality include Bayview, Cavendish, Stanley Bridge, and Green Gables. The municipal office is located in Cavendish at the intersection of Route 6 and Route 13.

== Demographics ==
Federal census population history of Resort Municipality
Year	Pop.	±%
1986	261	—
1991	256	−1.9%
1996	255	−0.4%
2001	267	+4.7%
2006	272	+1.9%
2011	266	−2.2%
2016	328	+23.3%
2021	359	+9.5%
Source: Statistics Canada

In the 2021 Census of Population conducted by Statistics Canada, Stanley Bridge, Hope River, Bayview, Cavendish and North Rustico had a population of 359 living in 149 of its 330 total private dwellings, a change of 12.9% from its 2016 population of 318. With a land area of 36.1 km^{2} (13.9 sq mi), it had a population density of 9.9/km^{2} (25.8/sq mi) in 2021.

== Government ==
Resort Municipality is governed by an elected council comprising a mayor and six councillors. The mayor of the current council is Lee Brammer while the remaining council seats are held by councillors George Clark-Dunning, Kay Hryckiw, Chris Robinson, Ryan Simpson, Ian Stewart and Catherine Peconi. The municipality's chief administrative officer is Brenda MacDonald.

Stanley Bridge, Hope River, Bayview, Cavendish and North Rustico federal election results
Year	Liberal		Conservative		New Democratic		Green	
2021	50%	120	30%	72	7%	16	12%	28
2019	39%	81	24%	51	5%	10	32%	66

Stanley Bridge, Hope River, Bayview, Cavendish and North Rustico provincial election results
Year	PC		Liberal		Green	
2019	53%	98	18%	33	27%	51
2015	45%	87	37%	71	9%	17
