= Hunter River (Prince Edward Island) =

Coordinates: 46°46′N 64°07′W

The Hunter River, informally nicknamed the "River Clyde", is a Canadian river in northwestern Queens County, Prince Edward Island.

From its source near Hartsville, the river flows northerly, becoming a tidal estuary at New Glasgow, an arm of Rustico Bay which gradually widens to approximately 750 metres (2,460 ft) wide. It discharges into the Gulf of St Lawrence. The river's total meander length is about 13 kilometres (8 mi), with an additional 8 kilometres (5 mi) of estuary.

The river runs through the communities of Hunter River, New Glasgow and North Rustico. There was at one time a ferry at Hunter River and the river was dammed in at least two locations to power mills. The headponds are still in existence.

The watershed covers approximately 9,000 hectares (22,000 acres).

The local Hunter-Clyde Watershed Group was established in 2000 to improve and maintain the health of the watershed's ecosystem.

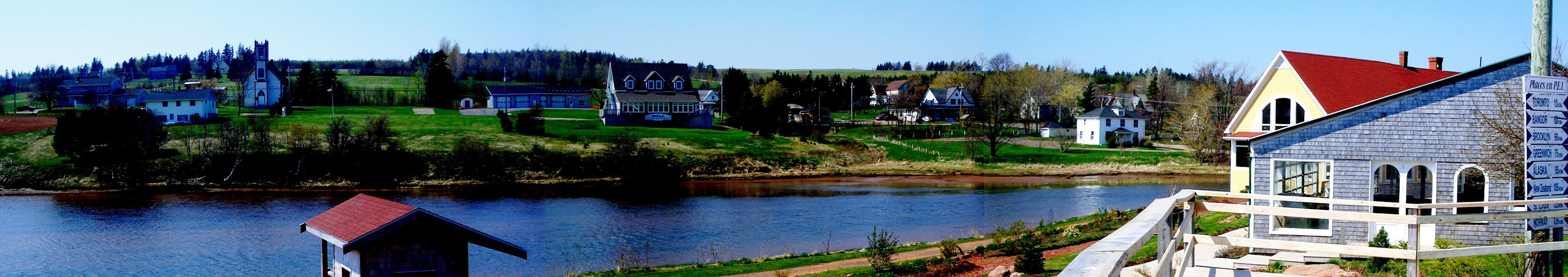
Panorama the Hunter River in New Glasgow

== See also ==
- List of rivers of Prince Edward Island
