= Harrington, Prince Edward Island =

Coordinates: 46.350°N 63.168°W

Harrington is an unincorporated area in the Queens County region of Prince Edward Island, Canada.

This small rural community neighbors Brackley Beach and is just north of Charlottetown. Harrington is home to Agriculture and Agri-Food Canada's Harrington Research Farm.
