= South Rustico, Prince Edward Island =

South Rustico
- Unincorporated Rural Area
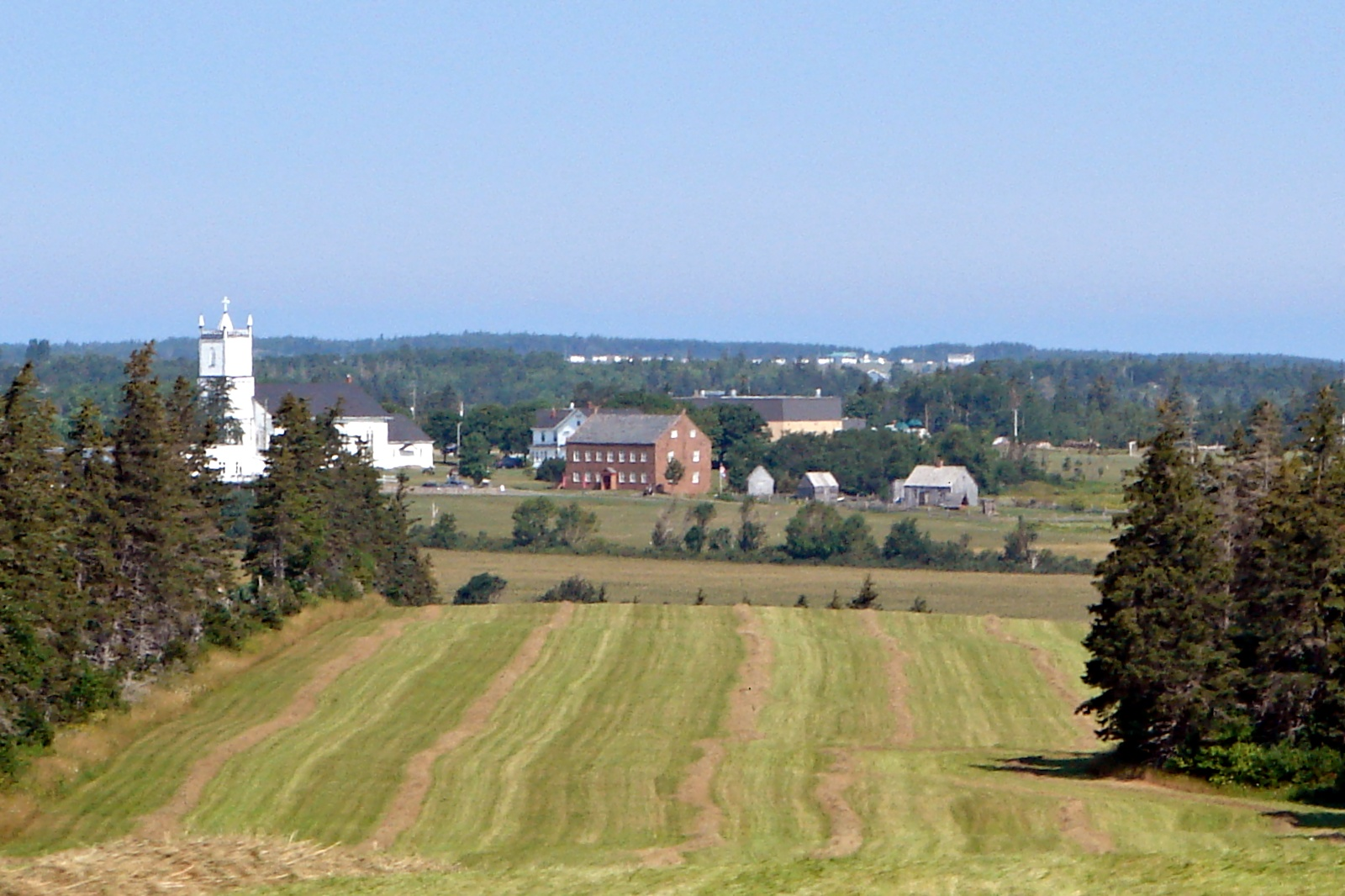
- South Rustico

- Location within Prince Edward Island
- Coordinates: 46.415757°N 63.291749°W
- Country: Canada
- Province: Prince Edward Island
- County: Queens County
- Parish: Greensville
- Lot: Lot 24
- Time zone: Atlantic (AST)
- Canadian Postal code: C0A 1N0
- Area code: 902
- NTS Map: 011L06
- GNBC Code: BACJG

South Rustico, formerly called Rustico, is an unincorporated rural community in the township of Lot 24, Queens County, Prince Edward Island, Canada.

South Rustico is located 6 kilometres (4 mi) south of North Rustico and 26 kilometres (16 mi) north of Charlottetown in the central part of the province on the north shore.
