= Cable Head, Prince Edward Island =

Unincorporated community in Canada

Coordinates: 46.4667°N 62.6167°W

Location of Cable Head in Prince Edward Island

Cable Head is an unincorporated community in Kings County, Prince Edward Island, Canada, north of St. Peters Bay, west of Goose River, and east of Greenwich, home of Greenwich National Park.

The official history of the geographic name Cable Head is that when the first Scots settlers came to this district, they found on the shore below the farm now owned by John Simmons, a piece of hemp cable, evidently from some vessel. From this incident they named the place in Gaelic "Ceann Cable" meaning 'Cable End.' The word Ceann means End, but it also means 'head.'. When English became the most common language, the name was translated in the form "Cable Head."

Cable Head is divided into 2 sections, Cable Head East and Cable Head West.

Cable Head is the home of the Cable Head Airpark, a seasonal airport that only operates during the summer.

Cable Head was home of Corporal George Palmer, who survived 46 months as a prisoner in Japanese POW Camps in World War II. A book, “Dark Side of the Sun” has been written about him by his grandson Michael Palmer.

Canadian playwright David French (1939-2010), most noted for his “Mercer Plays”, resided in Cable Head during the summers.

Cable Head has recently been nicknamed “Cable Hamptons”, due to the continuous construction of large summer homes on its beachfront.
