= Summerfield, Prince Edward Island =

Human settlement in Prince Edward Island, Canada

Coordinates: 46°24′0″N 63°33′0″W

Summerfield is a Canadian rural community in Queens County, Prince Edward Island.

It is located southeast of Kensington.
