= New Glasgow, Prince Edward Island =

Unincorporated area in Queens County, Prince Edward Island

Coordinates: 46°24′38″N 63°20′58″W

Location of New Glasgow, Prince Edward Island

New Glasgow is an unincorporated area located in Queens County in the central portion of Prince Edward Island, south-west of North Rustico. It is situated amongst the Hunter River.

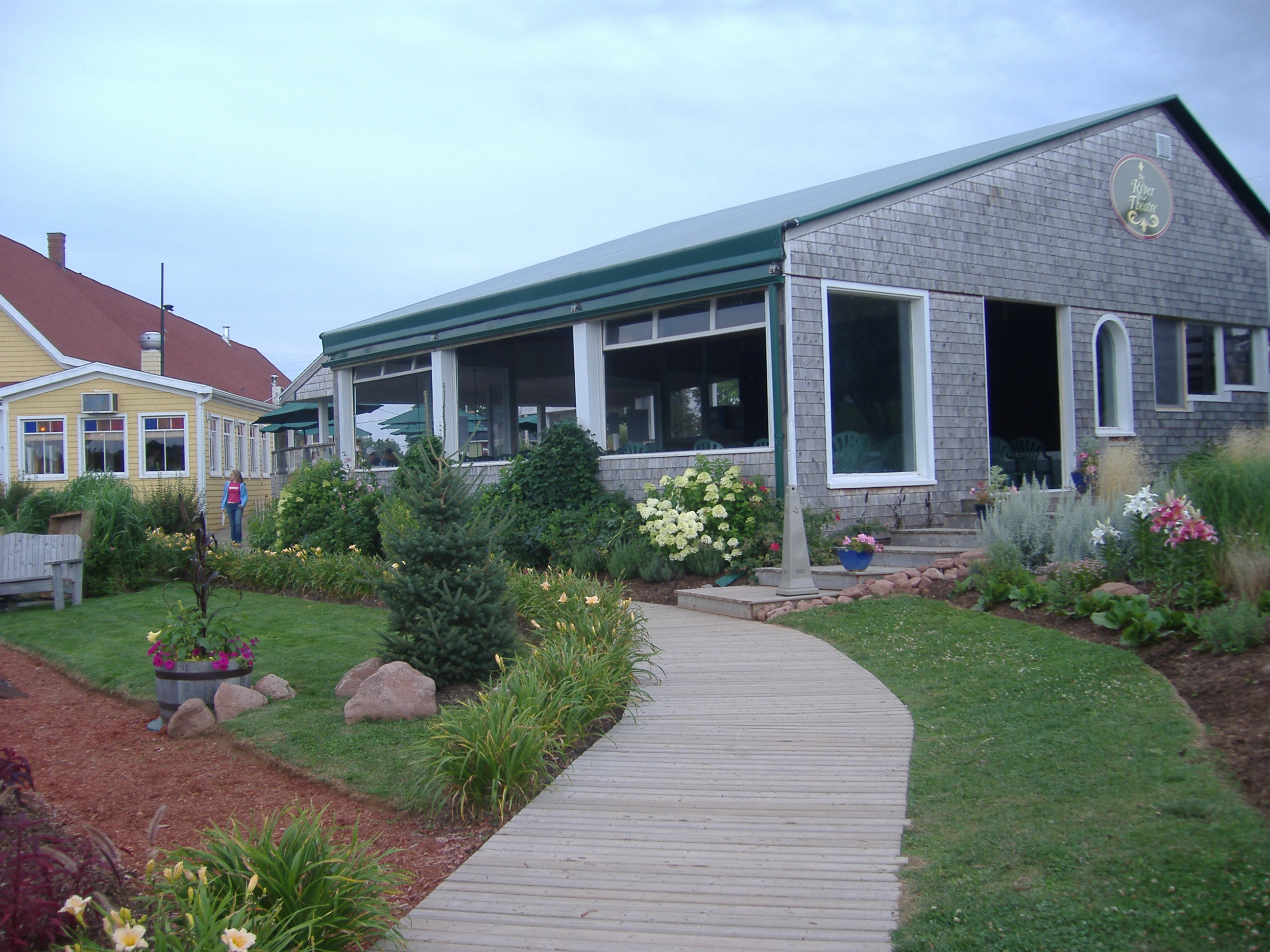
The Prince Edward Island Preserve Company

== Climate ==
Climate data for New Glasgow (1981–2010)
Month	Jan	Feb	Mar	Apr	May	Jun	Jul	Aug	Sep	Oct	Nov	Dec	Year
Record high °C (°F)	14.5 (58.1)	15.0 (59.0)	16.1 (61.0)	24.0 (75.2)	31.7 (89.1)	31.5 (88.7)	33.3 (91.9)	34.0 (93.2)	33.0 (91.4)	25.0 (77.0)	22.5 (72.5)	15.0 (59.0)	34.0 (93.2)
Mean daily maximum °C (°F)	−3.3 (26.1)	−2.7 (27.1)	1.1 (34.0)	6.9 (44.4)	14.0 (57.2)	19.5 (67.1)	23.5 (74.3)	23.2 (73.8)	18.8 (65.8)	12.4 (54.3)	6.2 (43.2)	0.4 (32.7)	10.0 (50.0)
Daily mean °C (°F)	−7.7 (18.1)	−7.3 (18.9)	−2.8 (27.0)	3.1 (37.6)	9.2 (48.6)	14.6 (58.3)	18.8 (65.8)	18.6 (65.5)	14.4 (57.9)	8.5 (47.3)	3.0 (37.4)	−3.3 (26.1)	5.8 (42.4)
Mean daily minimum °C (°F)	−12.1 (10.2)	−11.7 (10.9)	−6.7 (19.9)	−0.8 (30.6)	4.4 (39.9)	9.7 (49.5)	14.1 (57.4)	14.0 (57.2)	9.9 (49.8)	4.5 (40.1)	−0.3 (31.5)	−6.9 (19.6)	1.5 (34.7)
Record low °C (°F)	−32.0 (−25.6)	−34.5 (−30.1)	−27.0 (−16.6)	−13.9 (7.0)	−7.2 (19.0)	−1.5 (29.3)	3.5 (38.3)	2.8 (37.0)	−1.7 (28.9)	−7.8 (18.0)	−16.5 (2.3)	−25.5 (−13.9)	−34.5 (−30.1)
Average precipitation mm (inches)	120.0 (4.72)	86.8 (3.42)	95.6 (3.76)	97.1 (3.82)	101.9 (4.01)	98.3 (3.87)	78.6 (3.09)	87.5 (3.44)	107.4 (4.23)	122.9 (4.84)	129.3 (5.09)	132.5 (5.22)	1,257.9 (49.52)
Average rainfall mm (inches)	40.5 (1.59)	29.9 (1.18)	45.1 (1.78)	69.2 (2.72)	98.1 (3.86)	98.3 (3.87)	78.6 (3.09)	87.5 (3.44)	107.4 (4.23)	121.7 (4.79)	107.9 (4.25)	60.2 (2.37)	944.4 (37.18)
Average snowfall cm (inches)	79.5 (31.3)	56.9 (22.4)	50.5 (19.9)	27.9 (11.0)	3.8 (1.5)	0.0 (0.0)	0.0 (0.0)	0.0 (0.0)	0.0 (0.0)	1.2 (0.5)	21.4 (8.4)	72.3 (28.5)	313.6 (123.5)
Average precipitation days (≥ 0.2 mm)	15.9	12.4	14.8	14.8	15.0	13.2	12.7	12.2	13.3	15.5	17.7	17.8	175.2
Average rainy days (≥ 0.2 mm)	5.1	4.4	7.0	11.3	14.8	13.2	12.7	12.2	13.3	15.4	14.4	7.9	131.5
Average snowy days (≥ 0.2 cm)	13.0	9.9	10.4	5.3	0.68	0.0	0.0	0.0	0.0	0.48	5.1	12.5	57.3
Source: Environment Canada
