= Brackley Beach, Prince Edward Island =

Community in Prince Edward Island, Canada

Coordinates: 46°25′52″N 63°12′58″W

Location of Brackley Beach in PEI

The community of Brackley Beach, formerly Brackley Point, is a small Canadian rural farming community located in central Prince Edward Island on the province's north shore, approximately 10 km north of the community of Brackley, from which it derives its name.

Brackley Beach is bordered on the north by the Prince Edward Island National Park of Canada which is home to sand dunes, barrier islands and sandspits, beaches, sandstone cliffs, wetlands and forests. These diverse habitats provide a home for a variety of plants and animals, including the threatened Gulf of Saint Lawrence Aster and the endangered Piping Plover.

The Brackley Beach area became a popular vacation spot in the late 19th century, and its shoreline was designated as part of the national park in 1937. Activities include deep sea fishing, bike, canoe and kayak rentals, horseback riding, campgrounds, several restaurants and dairy bars as well as Prince Edward Island's only drive-in theater.
