= Hunter River, Prince Edward Island =

Hunter River
- Community
- Hunter River in Prince Edward Island
- Coordinates: 46.35497°N 63.34897°W
- Country: Canada
- Province: Prince Edward Island
- County: Queens County
- Parish: Grenville Parish
- Township: Lot 23
- Incorporated: 1974
- Community: 1983

Government
  - CAO: Sarah Weeks

Area
  - Total: 2.33 sq mi (6.04 km^{2})

Population (2021)
  - Total: 390
  - Density: 167/sq mi (64.5/km^{2})
- Time zone: UTC-4 (AST)
  - Summer (DST): UTC-3 (ADT)
- Canadian Postal code: C0A 1N0
- Area code: 902
- Telephone Exchanges: 621, 734, 964
- NTS Map: 011L06
- GNBC Code: BAEKC
- Website: Community Website

Hunter River is a municipality that holds community status in Prince Edward Island, Canada. It is located in Queens County southwest of North Rustico. It is situated on the Hunter River.

It has been suggested that Hunter River is represented in the works of Lucy Maud Montgomery as Bright River in the fictional region of Avonlea.

James Charles McGuigan, who became Archbishop of Toronto and a Cardinal, was born in Hunter River.

== Demographics ==
Federal census population history of Hunter River
Year	Pop.	±%
1971	311	—
1976	310	−0.3%
1981	322	+3.9%
1986	317	−1.6%
1991	356	+12.3%
1996	354	−0.6%
2001	354	+0.0%
2006	319	−9.9%
2011	294	−7.8%
2016	356	+21.1%
2021	390	+9.6%
Source: Statistics Canada

In the 2021 Census of Population conducted by Statistics Canada, Hunter River had a population of 390 living in 164 of its 170 total private dwellings, a change of 9.6% from its 2016 population of 356. With a land area of 6.04 km^{2} (2.33 sq mi), it had a population density of 64.6/km^{2} (167.2/sq mi) in 2021.
