= Stanhope, Prince Edward Island =

Coordinates: 46°24′24″N 63°06′27″W

Location of Stanhope in PEI

Stanhope is a Canadian rural community on the north shore of Prince Edward Island. Administratively, it is part of the Rural Municipality of North Shore.

Located within the township of Lot 34, Stanhope's population grows significantly during the summer cottage season. However, the year-round population has been increasing in recent years.

Stanhope borders Prince Edward Island National Park, and is home to Stanhope Beach as well as several scenic and popular walking trails.

== Climate ==
Climate data for Stanhope
Month	Jan	Feb	Mar	Apr	May	Jun	Jul	Aug	Sep	Oct	Nov	Dec	Year
Record high °C (°F)	15.5 (59.9)	14.7 (58.5)	16.5 (61.7)	23.5 (74.3)	31.1 (88.0)	32 (90)	33.3 (91.9)	33.6 (92.5)	33.1 (91.6)	28.7 (83.7)	22.5 (72.5)	16.7 (62.1)	33.6 (92.5)
Mean daily maximum °C (°F)	−2.8 (27.0)	−3 (27)	1.1 (34.0)	6.1 (43.0)	13.3 (55.9)	19.3 (66.7)	23.3 (73.9)	22.6 (72.7)	18.1 (64.6)	12.1 (53.8)	6.2 (43.2)	0.5 (32.9)	9.8 (49.6)
Mean daily minimum °C (°F)	−11.5 (11.3)	−11.4 (11.5)	−6.6 (20.1)	−0.9 (30.4)	4.6 (40.3)	10.6 (51.1)	15 (59)	14.7 (58.5)	10.7 (51.3)	5.2 (41.4)	0.2 (32.4)	−6.5 (20.3)	2 (36)
Record low °C (°F)	−30 (−22)	−33.2 (−27.8)	−24.8 (−12.6)	−14.4 (6.1)	−7.8 (18.0)	−0.8 (30.6)	5 (41)	4.4 (39.9)	0 (32)	−4.5 (23.9)	−13 (9)	−25.5 (−13.9)	−33.2 (−27.8)
Average precipitation mm (inches)	112.2 (4.42)	94 (3.7)	83 (3.3)	81.3 (3.20)	95.8 (3.77)	75.7 (2.98)	75 (3.0)	85.5 (3.37)	84 (3.3)	116.3 (4.58)	123.4 (4.86)	132.9 (5.23)	1,159.1 (45.63)
Source: Environment Canada
