= New London, Prince Edward Island =

New London
- Village
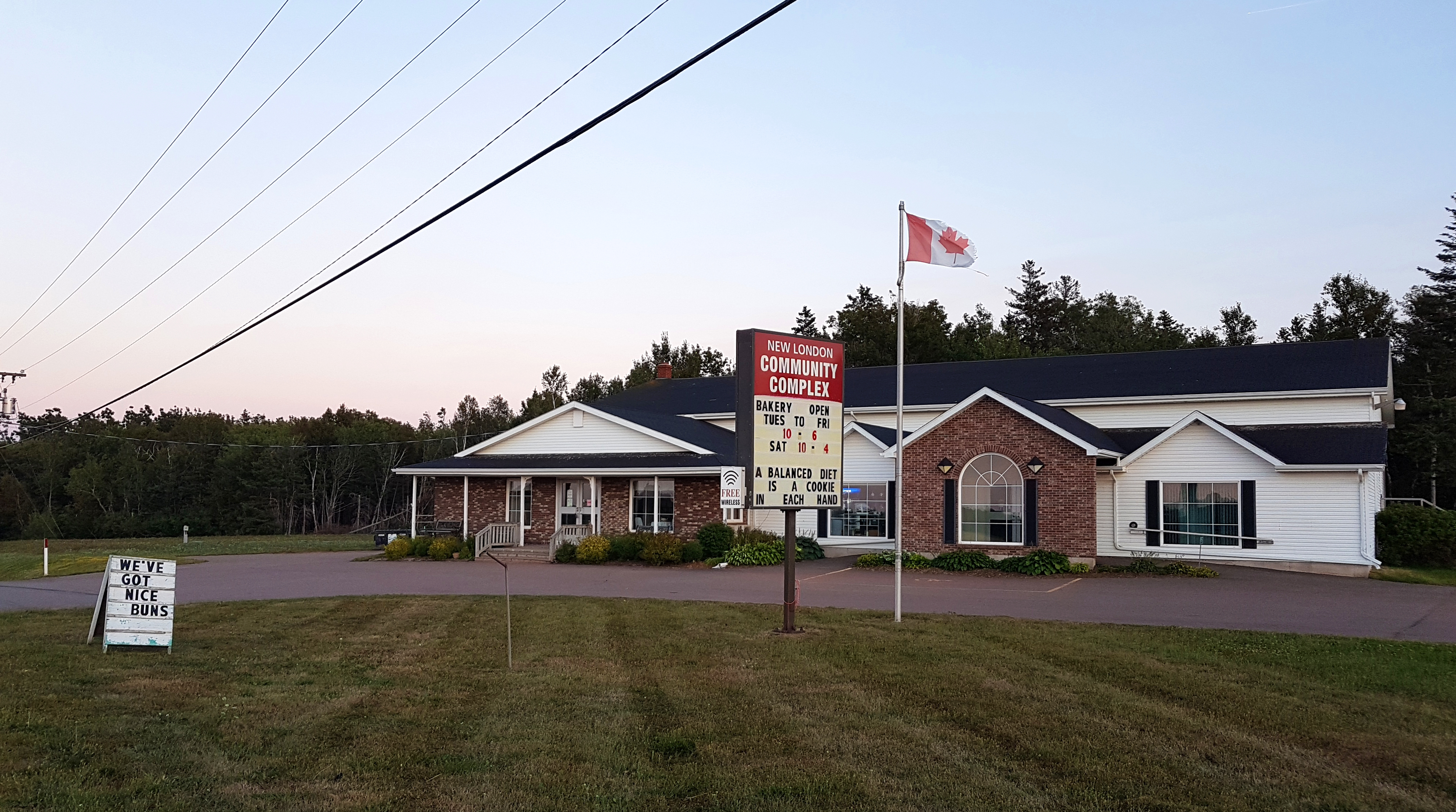

- Location of New London in Prince Edward Island
- Coordinates: 46°27′53″N 63°30′40″W
- Country: Canada
- Province: Prince Edward Island
- County: Queens

New London is a Canadian rural community located in Queens County, Prince Edward Island.

Situated in the township of Lot 21, halfway between Kensington and Cavendish, New London was formerly known as Clifton and previous to that, Graham's Corner.

New London is primarily a farming and fishing community with its neatly manicured fields and gently rolling hills providing pastoral scenery surrounding a busy harbour. In recent decades tourism has played an increasingly important role in the community's economy.

Lucy Maud Montgomery, one of Canada's most famous authors, was born in New London on November 30, 1874. She wrote 23 books, including a short-story collection and a poetry anthology, but is best known for Anne of Green Gables, published in 1908.

== History ==
Before the present New London village, there was a community called New London located at the mouth of Malpeque Bay, where the New London lighthouse is located at the end of Cape Road (close to French River). This community was settled by Robert Clark, an English Quaker merchant who owned Lot 21. He arrived in 1773 with grand plans to build a settlement to rival his native London.

One of Clark's early settlers was Benjamin Chappell, one of the founders of the Methodist faith on the island, who came to New London aboard the sailing ship The Snow Elizabeth in 1774. Chappell wrote a diary of his experiences, and described his first, harsh New London winter as being "... very short of provisions. No rum, no bread, no meat, no beer, no sugar and half an ox", and (on March 1), wrote that "the people in general through the want of bread seem to decline in their work."

The present New London (previously called New London South, then Clifton and before that, Graham's Corner) was settled by Scottish immigrants before 1859.
