= Lot 21, Prince Edward Island =

- Township
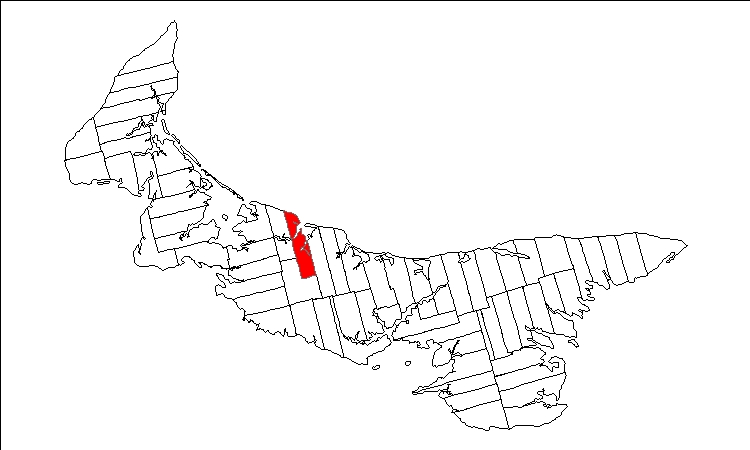
- Map of Prince Edward Island highlighting Lot 21
- Coordinates: 46°25′N 63°29′W
- Country: Canada
- Province: Prince Edward Island
- County: Queens County
- Parish: Greenville Parish

Area
  - Total: 76.77 km^{2} (29.64 sq mi)

Population (2006)
  - Total: 920
  - Density: 12/km^{2} (31/sq mi)
- Time zone: UTC-4 (AST)
  - Summer (DST): UTC-3 (ADT)
- Canadian Postal code: C0A
- Area code: 902
- NTS Map: 011L06
- GNBC Code: BAERH

Lot 21 is a township in Queens County, Prince Edward Island, Canada. It is part of Greenville Parish. Lot 21 was awarded to Hugh and Lauchlin MacLeane in the 1767 land lottery. Merchant Robert Clark became owner in 1775.

A local church, Geddie Memorial, is dedicated to Rev. John Geddie, a Presbyterian minister who preached there from 1838 to 1845, before becaming a missionary in Vanuatu.

== Communities ==
Incorporated municipalities:

- Stanley Bridge, Hope River, Bayview, Cavendish and North Rustico

Civic address communities:

- Fredericton
- French River
- Grahams Road
- Granville
- Millvale
- New London
- Park Corner
- Pleasant Valley
- South Granville
- Springbrook
- Springfield
- Stanley Bridge

== Demographics ==
Historical population
Year	Pop.	±%
1871	1,569	—
1881	1,871	+19.2%
1891	1,700	−9.1%
1901	1,532	−9.9%
1911	1,678	+9.5%
1921	1,105	−34.1%
1931	1,091	−1.3%
1941	1,038	−4.9%
2006	920	−11.4%
