= Kensington, Prince Edward Island =

Kensington
- Town
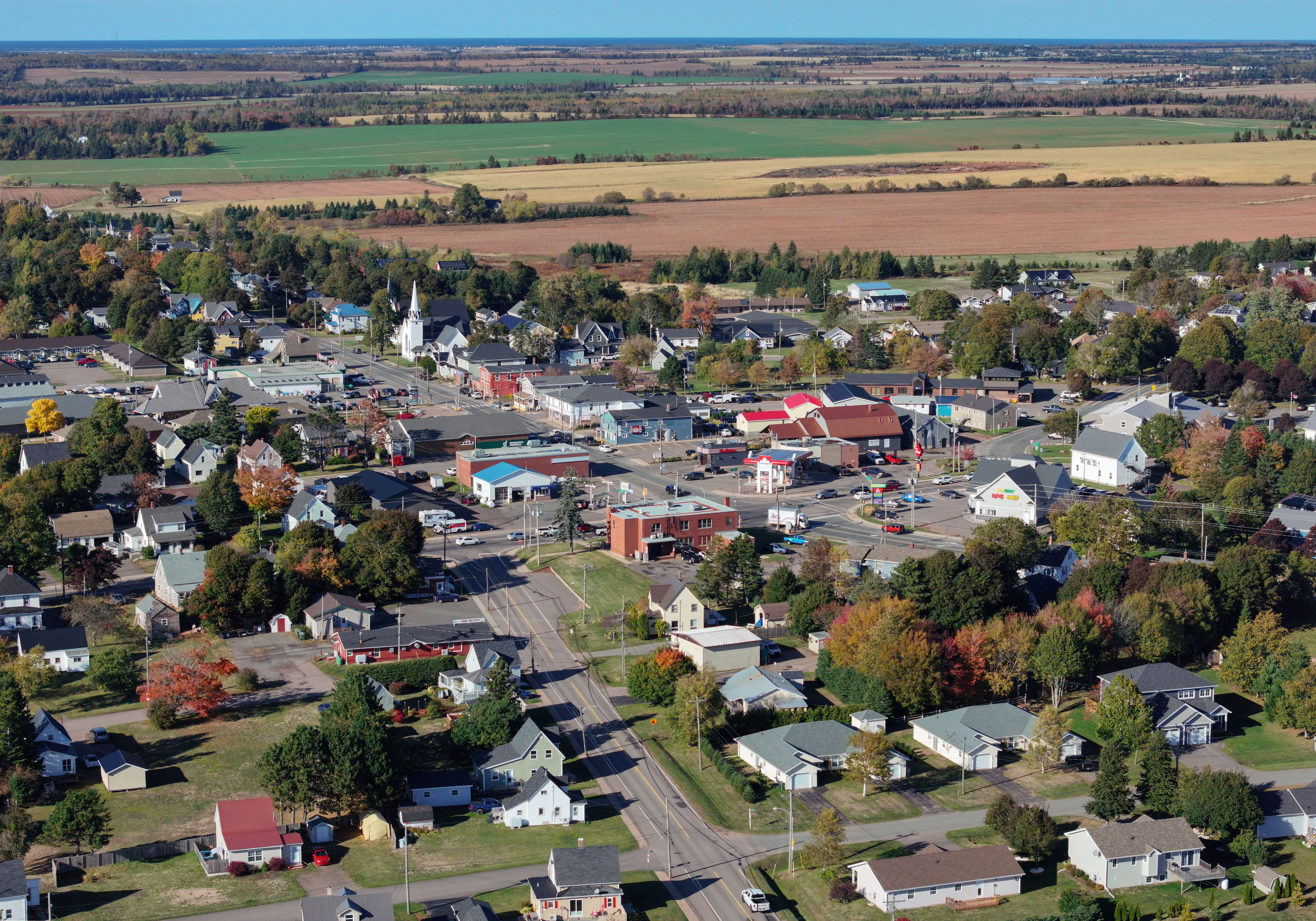

- Coat of arms
- Nickname: K'town
- Kensington in Prince Edward Island
- Coordinates: 46.43775°N 63.63564°W
- Country: Canada
- Province: Prince Edward Island
- County: Prince County
- Founded: 1824

Government
  - Mayor: Jeff Spencer
  - Councillors: Bonnie MacRae; Rodney Mann; Ivan Gallant; Wade Toombs; Tyler Doucette; Shawn McCarvill

Area
  - Total: 3.17 km^{2} (1.22 sq mi)
- Elevation: 35 m (115 ft)

Population (2021)
  - Total: 1,812
  - Density: 572/km^{2} (1,480/sq mi)
- Time zone: UTC-4 (Atlantic (AST))
  - Summer (DST): UTC-3 (ADT)
- Canadian Postal code: C0B 1M0
- Area code: 902 (836 exchange)
- NTS Map: 011L05
- GNBC Code: BABMQ
- Website: www.kensington.ca

Kensington is a Canadian town located in Prince County, Prince Edward Island. It is 15 km (9.3 mi) northeast of the city of Summerside. In 2021, its population was 1,812 and is seeing rapid growth thanks in part to a recently opened business park.

== History ==
The area was first known as Five Lanes End, as roads from five different communities converged at the point. It was renamed Barrett's Cross in 1824 after an early settler who established an inn in the area. In 1862, the town was renamed after Kensington Palace in London and it became a town after the Prince Edward Island Railway's mainline from Charlottetown to Summerside curved through the community. The town's former railyards are now rehabilitated as a tourist venue, with the former Kensington Railway Station designed by architect Charles Benjamin Chappell designated a National Historic Site of Canada in 1976.

== Demographics ==
Federal census population history of Kensington
Year	Pop.	±%
1921	556	—
1931	612	+10.1%
1941	767	+25.3%
1951	811	+5.7%
1956	854	+5.3%
1961	884	+3.5%
1966	1,022	+15.6%
1971	1,086	+6.3%
1976	1,150	+5.9%
1981	1,143	−0.6%
1986	1,105	−3.3%
1991	1,332	+20.5%
1996	1,383	+3.8%
2001	1,385	+0.1%
2006	1,485	+7.2%
2011	1,496	+0.7%
2016	1,619	+8.2%
2021	1,812	+11.9%
Source: Statistics Canada

In the 2021 Census of Population conducted by Statistics Canada, Kensington had a population of 1,812 living in 865 of its 897 total private dwellings, a change of 11.9% from its 2016 population of 1,619. With a land area of 3.17 km^{2} (1.22 sq mi), it had a population density of 571.6/km^{2} (1,480.5/sq mi) in 2021.

== Events ==
Aside from being a service centre for the surrounding farming, fishing and tourism areas, Kensington hosts many notable events throughout the year. These include the Kensington Harvest Festival, Community Gardens Ambassador Program, and many more.

== Education ==
Kensington has schools from Preschool to Secondary. It is part of the English Language School Board (formerly part of the Western School Board) District of schools. At the Preschool level there are numerous organizations such as Fun Times Kindergarten, Play School, Happy Days Playschool, and Kiddietown Day Care.

Kensington has one elementary school, Queen Elizabeth Elementary. Opened on December 3, 1976, Queen Elizabeth teaches kindergarten through grade 6. The school has two playgrounds, the front playground being used for the primary grades and the back playground for grades 4 through 6. The school contains a music room, gymnasium, French room, and library. Many extracurricular activities are offered to students, such as intramurals, choir, chess club, photography club and more.

It is also home to Kensington Intermediate Senior High School which teaches grades seven to twelve. KISH (as it is often abbreviated) offers many extracurricular programs and organizations such as the Gender Sexuality Alliance, the student council, sports teams (e.g. rugby, soccer, basketball and more), Travel and Tourism, Agriculture (known commonly as Aggies), concert and jazz band and much more.
