= Demographics of Prince Edward Island =

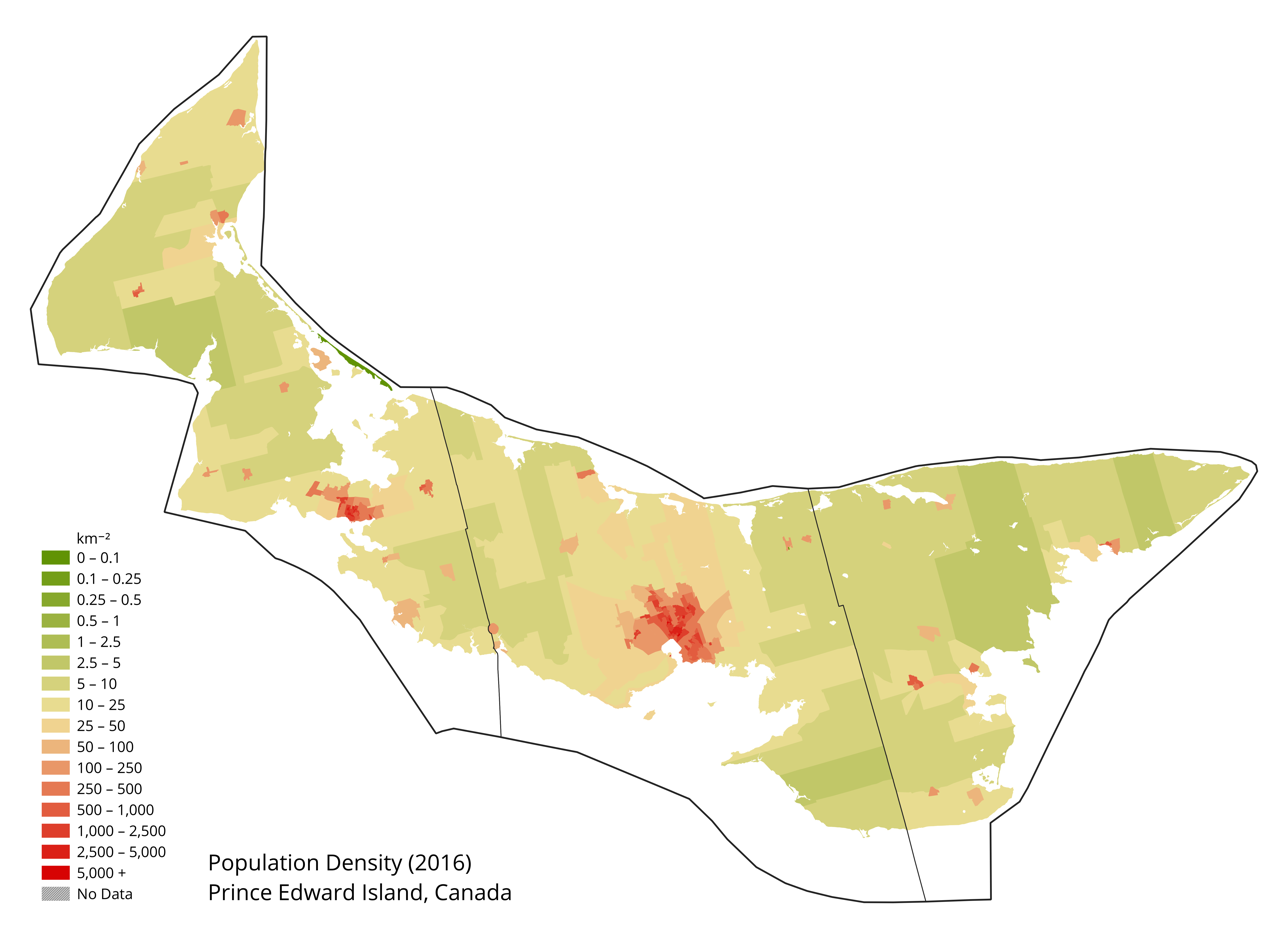
Canada Prince Edward Island Density 2016

Prince Edward Island is a Canadian province. According to the 2011 National Household Survey, the largest ethnic group consists of people of Scottish descent (39.2%), followed by English (31.1%), Irish (30.4%), French (21.1%), German (5.2%), and Dutch (3.1%) descent. Prince Edward Island is mostly a white community and there are few visible minorities. Chinese people are the largest visible minority group of Prince Edward Island, comprising 1.3% of the province's population. Almost half of respondents identified their ethnicity as "Canadian." Prince Edward Island is by a strong margin the most Celtic and specifically the most Scottish province in Canada and perhaps the most Scottish place (ethnically) in the world, outside Scotland. 38% of islanders claim Scottish ancestry, but this is an underestimate and it is thought that almost 50% of islanders have Scottish roots. When combined with Irish and Welsh, almost 80% of islanders are of some Celtic stock, albeit most families have resided in PEI for at least two centuries. Few places outside Europe can claim such a homogeneous Celtic ethnic background. The only other jurisdiction in North America with such a high percentage of British Isles heritage is Newfoundland.

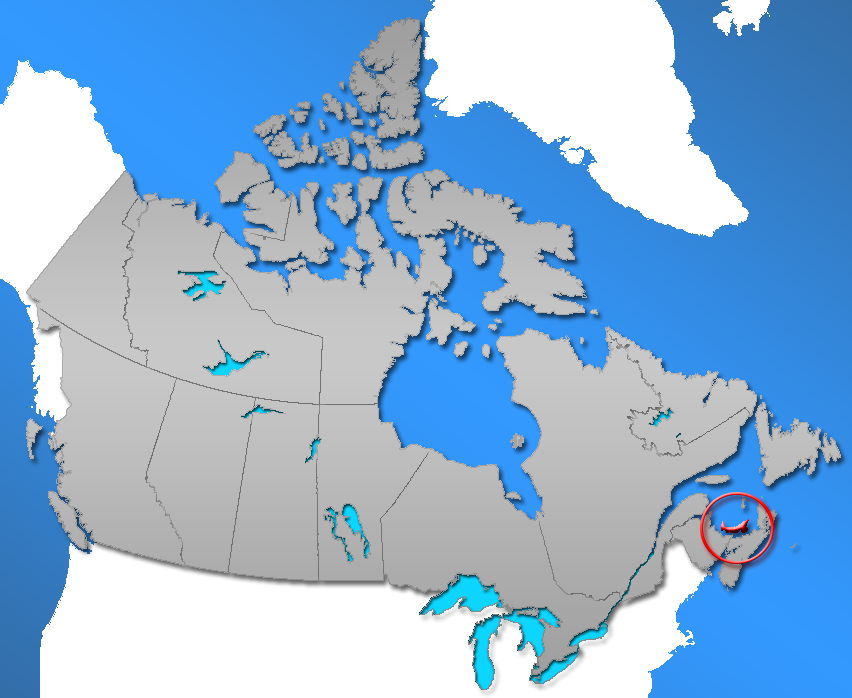
Demographics of Canada's provinces and territories

== Population history ==
View chart definition.

Population of Prince Edward Island since 1851
Year	Population	Mean annual % change	5-year % change	10-year % change	Rank among provinces
1850	62,678	n/a	n/a	n/a	5
1861	80,857	2.6	n/a	29.0	5
1871	94,021	1.5	n/a	16.3	5
1881	108,891	1.5	n/a	15.8	5
1891	109,078	0.017	n/a	0.2	6
1901	103,259	−0.55	n/a	-5.3	7
1911	93,728	−0.96	n/a	-9.2	9
1921	88,615	−0.56	n/a	-5.4	9
1931	88,038	−0.065	n/a	-0.7	9
1941	95,047	0.77	n/a	8.0	9
1951	98,429	0.35	n/a	3.6	10
1956	99,285	0.17	0.9	n/a	10
1961	104,629	1.1	5.4	6.3	10
1966	108,535	0.74	3.7	9.3	10
1971	111,635	0.56	2.9	6.7	10
1976	118,225	1.2	5.9	8.9	10
1981	122,506	0.7	3.6	9.7	10
1986	126,640	0.67	3.4	7.1	10
1991	129,765	0.49	2.5	5.9	10
1996	134,557	0.73	3.7	6.3	10
2001	135,294	0.11	0.5	4.2	10
2006	138,581	0.47	2.4	2.9	10
2011	140,204	0.25	1.2	3.6	10
2016	142,907	n/a	1.9	3.1	10
2021	154,331	n/a	n/a	n/a	n/a

Source: Statistics Canada

== Population geography ==
=== Census agglomerations ===
Source: Statistics Canada

City	2021	2016	2011	2006	Land Area (km^{2})	Density (/km^{2})
Charlottetown	78,858	71,821	64,487	59,325	1,112.43	70.9
Summerside	18,157	16,831	16,488	16,153	125.12	145.1

=== Cities and towns ===
All statistics according to 2016 Canadian census, unless otherwise specified

Town	Population	Population (2011)	Population ranking	Land Area (km^{2})	Area ranking	Density (/km^{2})	Density ranking
Alberton	1,145	1,135	7	4.52	6	253.5	8
Borden-Carleton	724	750	9	12.99	5	55.7	10
Charlottetown	36,094	34,562	1	44.34	1	814.1	1
Cornwall	5,348	5,162	4	28.19	3	189.7	9
Georgetown	555	675	10	1.59	10	348.1	6
Kensington	1,619	1,513	6	3.01	9	537.8	3
Montague	1,961	1,895	5	3.16	8	620.8	2
Souris	1,053	1,173	8	3.47	7	303.7	7
Stratford	9,706	8,574	3	22.53	4	430.8	5
Summerside	14,829	14,751	2	28.49	2	520.5	4

== Ethnic origins ==
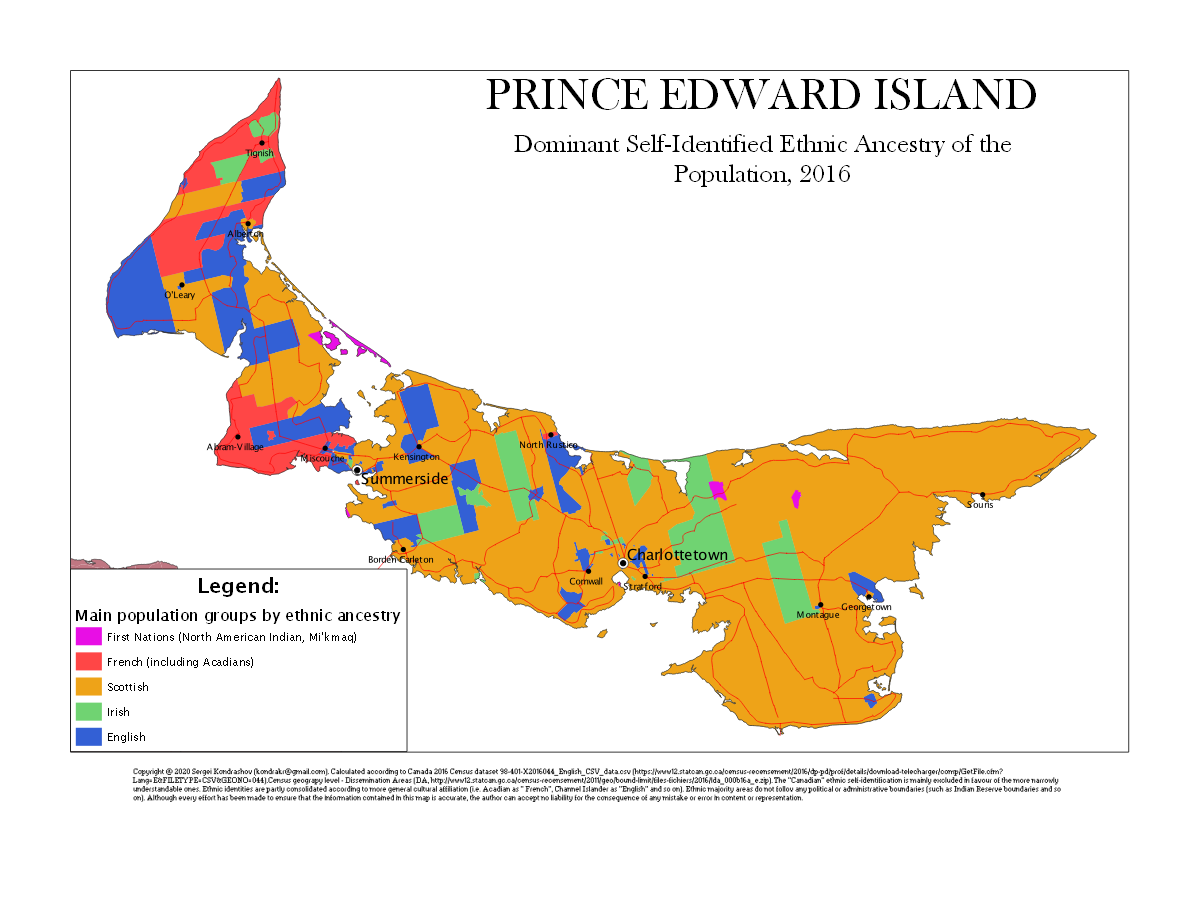
Dominant self-identified ethnic origin of the population of Prince Edward Island

Ethnic origin	Population	Percent
Canadian	60,000	44.98%
Scottish	50,700	38.01%
English	38,330	28.74%
Irish	37,170	27.87%
French	28,410	21.30%
German	5,400	4.05%
Dutch (Netherlands)	4,130	3.10%
Acadian	3,020	2.26%
North American Indian	2,360	1.77%
Welsh	1,440	1.08%
American (USA)	640	
Polish	615	
Italian	605	
Lebanese	525	
Danish	420	
Norwegian	325	
Ukrainian	320	
Swedish	315	
Belgian	240	
Métis	245	
Chinese	225	
Hungarian (Magyar)	225	
British, not included elsewhere	210	
Spanish	175	
Jewish	165	
Russian	160	
Swiss	145	
Finnish	135	
Inuit	120	

Information taken from the Canada 2001 Census..
* These percentages sum to more than 100% due to dual responses (e.g. "French-Canadian" generating an entry in both "French" and "Canadian" categories.) Groups with greater than 1,000 responses are included.

== Visible minorities and Indigenous peoples ==
Visible minority & Indigenous population in Prince Edward Island (1986–2021)
Group	Population	2021 census		2016 census		2011 census		2006 census		2001 census		1996 census		1991 census		1986 census	
Group	Population	Pop.	%	Pop.	%	Pop.	%	Pop.	%	Pop.	%	Pop.	%	Pop.	%	Pop.	%
Non-Indigenous / non-visible minority group	British Isles (Note: Including multiple responses.) (Note: 1996-present census populations for British Isles and French origins may be undercounts, due to the creation of the "Canadian" ethnic origin category. All citizens of Canada are classified as "Canadians" as defined by Canada's nationality laws. However, "Canadian" as an ethnic group has since 1996 been added to census questionnaires for possible ancestry. "Canadian" was included as an example on the English questionnaire and "Canadien" as an example on the French questionnaire. "The majority of respondents to this selection are from the eastern part of the country that was first settled. Respondents generally are visibly European (Anglophones and Francophones), however no-longer self identify with their ethnic ancestral origins. This response is attributed to a multitude or generational distance from ancestral lineage. Source 1: Jack Jedwab (April 2008). "Our 'Cense' of Self: the 2006 Census saw 1.6 million 'Canadian' Canadians Return to British and French origins" (PDF). Association for Canadian Studies. p. 2. Archived from the original (PDF) on 2 October 2011. "Virtually all persons who reported "Canadian" in 1996 had English or French as a mother tongue, were born in Canada and had both parents born inside Canada. This suggests that many of these respondents were people whose families have been in this country for several generations. In effect the "new Canadians" were persons that previously reported either British or French origins. Moreover in 1996 some 55% of people with both parents born in Canada reported Canadian (alone or in combination with other origins). By contrast, only 4% of people with both parents born outside Canada reported Canadian. Thus the Canadian response did not appeal widely to either immigrants or their children. Most important however was that nearly half of those persons reporting Canadian origin in 1996 were in Quebec this represented a majority of the mother tongue francophone population[...]In the 2001 Census, 11.7 million people, or 39% of the total population, reported Canadian as their ethnic origin, either alone or in combination with other origins. Some 4.9 million Quebecers out of 7.1 million individuals reported Canadian or "Canadien" thus accounting for nearly seven in ten persons (nearly eighty percent of francophones in Quebec)." Source 2: Don Kerr (2007). The Changing Face of Canada: Essential Readings in Population. Canadian Scholars' Press. pp. 313–317. ISBN 978-1-55130-322-2. Source 3: Jantzen (2006) Footnote 5: Note that Canadian and Canadien have been separated since the two terms mean different things. In English, it usually means someone whose family has been in Canada for multiple generations. In French it is referring to "Les Habitants", settlers of New France during the 17th and 18th centuries who earned their living primarily from agricultural labour. Source 4: Jantzen (2006): The reporting of French New World ancestries (Canadien, Québécois, and French-Canadian) is concentrated in the 4th+ generations; 79% of French-Canadian, 88% of Canadien and 90% of Québécois are in the 4th+generations category. Source 5: Jantzen (2005): According to Table 3, the 4th+ generations are highest because of a strong sense of belonging to their ethnic or cultural group among those respondents reporting the New World ancestries of Canadien and Québécois. Source 6: Jantzen (2006): For respondents of French and New World ancestries the pattern is different. Where generational data is available, it is possible to see that not all respondents reporting these ancestries report a high sense of belonging to their ethnic or cultural group. The high proportions are focused among those respondents that are in the 4th+ generations, and unlike with the British Isles example, the difference between the 2nd and 3rd generations to the 4th+ generation is more pronounced. Since these ancestries are concentrated in the 4th+ generations, their high proportions of sense of belonging to ethnic or cultural group push up the 4th+ generational results.)	89,155	59.25%	85,140	60.95%	91,780	66.81%	91,335	68.06%	84,315	63.21%	98,830	74.39%	110,155	85.99%	109,560	87.58%
Non-Indigenous / non-visible minority group	French	30,800	20.47%	29,440	21.08%	32,760	23.85%	30,880	23.01%	29,955	22.46%	31,780	23.92%	31,040	24.23%	28,700	22.94%
Non-Indigenous / non-visible minority group	Western European	12,175	8.09%	11,625	8.32%	11,625	8.46%	11,770	8.77%	9,335	7%	9,740	7.33%	10,045	7.84%	8,125	6.5%
Non-Indigenous / non-visible minority group	Southern European	3,600	2.39%	2,650	1.9%	2,370	1.73%	1,960	1.46%	1,335	1%	1,170	0.88%	970	0.76%	750	0.6%
Non-Indigenous / non-visible minority group	Eastern European	3,315	2.2%	3,030	2.17%	2,650	1.93%	2,260	1.68%	1,440	1.08%	1,535	1.16%	1,300	1.01%	950	0.76%
Non-Indigenous / non-visible minority group	European, n.i.e. & n.o.s.	2,475	1.64%	430	0.31%	300	0.22%	310	0.23%	3,190	2.39%	225	0.17%	175	0.14%	160	0.13%
Non-Indigenous / non-visible minority group	Northern European	2,275	1.51%	1,915	1.37%	2,155	1.57%	1,915	1.43%	1,290	0.97%	1,285	0.97%	865	0.68%	650	0.52%
Total non-Indigenous / non-visible minority population (Note: Single responses only unless otherwise specified.)		132,790	88.24%	130,300	93.28%	130,890	95.28%	130,650	97.35%	130,860	98.11%	130,415	98.16%	124,850	97.46%	122,515	97.94%
Visible minority (Note: Statistics Canada defines visible minorities as defined in the Employment Equity Act which defines visible minorities as "persons, other than Aboriginal peoples, who are non-Caucasian in race or non-white in colour".) group	South Asian	3,740	2.49%	925	0.66%	490	0.36%	135	0.1%	115	0.09%	140	0.11%	210	0.16%	255	0.2%
Visible minority group	Chinese	3,340	2.22%	2,565	1.84%	1,830	1.33%	255	0.19%	205	0.15%	345	0.26%	115	0.09%	190	0.15%
Visible minority group	Black	1,815	1.21%	825	0.59%	385	0.28%	645	0.48%	370	0.28%	265	0.2%	265	0.21%	355	0.28%
Visible minority group	Filipino	1,760	1.17%	670	0.48%	90	0.07%	30	0.02%	40	0.03%	40	0.03%	10	0.01%	0	0%
Visible minority group	Arab	1,130	0.75%	585	0.42%	200	0.15%	265	0.2%	170	0.13%	—N/a	—N/a	—N/a	—N/a	—N/a	—N/a
Visible minority group	Southeast Asian	1,040	0.69%	150	0.11%	205	0.15%	30	0.02%	45	0.03%	45	0.03%	25	0.02%	10	0.01%
Visible minority group	Latin American	590	0.39%	255	0.18%	235	0.17%	215	0.16%	75	0.06%	20	0.02%	95	0.07%	35	0.03%
Visible minority group	West Asian	290	0.19%	215	0.15%	345	0.25%	30	0.02%	20	0.01%	—N/a	—N/a	—N/a	—N/a	—N/a	—N/a
Visible minority group	Japanese	185	0.12%	110	0.08%	210	0.15%	65	0.05%	80	0.06%	95	0.07%	50	0.04%	0	0%
Visible minority group	Multiple visible minorities	175	0.12%	85	0.06%	70	0.05%	25	0.02%	20	0.01%	55	0.04%	10	0.01%	10	0.01%
Visible minority group	Visible minority, n.i.e.	125	0.08%	55	0.04%	75	0.05%	65	0.05%	30	0.02%	10	0.01%	10	0.01%	0	0%
Visible minority group	Korean	115	0.08%	210	0.15%	140	0.1%	70	0.05%	20	0.01%	50	0.04%	10	0.01%	0	0%
Visible minority group	Arab/West Asian	—N/a	—N/a	—N/a	—N/a	—N/a	—N/a	—N/a	—N/a	—N/a	—N/a	460	0.35%	570	0.44%	455	0.36%
Total visible minority population		14,305	9.51%	6,645	4.76%	4,255	3.1%	1,825	1.36%	1,180	0.88%	1,525	1.15%	1,340	1.05%	1,295	1.04%
Indigenous (Note: Statistics Canada defines Indigenous identity as persons who identify with the Indigenous Peoples of Canada.) group	First Nations	2,165	1.44%	1,875	1.34%	1,520	1.11%	1,230	0.92%	1,035	0.78%	780	0.59%	1,670 (Note: Including multiple Indigenous responses.)	1.3%	1,100	0.88%
Indigenous group	Métis	845	0.56%	710	0.51%	410	0.3%	385	0.29%	220	0.16%	110	0.08%	190	0.15%	135	0.11%
Indigenous group	Inuk (Inuit)	180	0.12%	75	0.05%	55	0.04%	30	0.02%	20	0.01%	10	0.01%	80	0.06%	20	0.02%
Indigenous group	Indigenous responses, n.i.e.	170	0.11%	60	0.04%	235	0.17%	75	0.06%	65	0.05%	—N/a	—N/a	—N/a	—N/a	—N/a	—N/a
Indigenous group	Multiple Indigenous responses	30	0.02%	15	0.01%	0	0%	10	0.01%	10	0.01%	10	0.01%	—N/a	—N/a	25	0.02%
Total Indigenous population		3,385	2.25%	2,740	1.96%	2,230	1.62%	1,730	1.29%	1,345	1.01%	915	0.69%	1,910	1.49%	1,280	1.02%
Total responses		150,480	97.5%	139,685	97.75%	137,375	97.98%	134,205	96.84%	133,385	98.59%	132,855	98.74%	128,100	98.72%	125,090	98.78%
Total population		154,331	100%	142,907	100%	140,204	100%	138,581	100%	135,294	100%	134,557	100%	129,765	100%	126,640	100%

== Languages ==
=== Knowledge of languages ===
Knowledge of official languages of Canada in Prince Edward Island (2016)
Language	Percent
English only	86.38%
French only	0.08%
English and French	12.65%
Neither English nor French	0.89%

The question on knowledge of languages allows for multiple responses. The following figures are from the 2021 Canadian Census and the 2016 Canadian Census, and lists languages that were selected by at least 0.5 per cent of respondents.

Knowledge of languages in Prince Edward Island
Language	2021		2016	
Language	Pop.	%	Pop.	%
English	149,525	99.36%	138,735	99.32%
French	19,445	12.92%	17,875	12.8%
Mandarin	2,940	1.95%	2,105	1.51%
Hindi	1,660	1.1%	165	0.12%
Tagalog	1,630	1.08%	615	0.44%
Punjabi	1,550	1.03%	185	0.13%
Spanish	1,425	0.95%	945	0.68%
Arabic	1,165	0.77%	650	0.47%
German	1,040	0.69%	570	0.41%
Vietnamese	785	0.52%	55	0.04%

=== Mother tongue ===
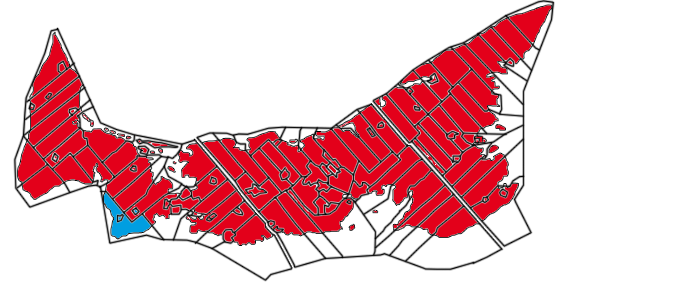
Mother tongue in Prince Edward Island (red: English, blue: French). The only part of the province to have a Francophone majority is the so-called Evangeline Region.

The 2006 Canadian census showed a population of 135,851. Of the 133,570 singular responses to the question concerning mother tongue the most commonly reported languages were:

Place	Language	Population	Percentage
1	English	125,260	93.78%
2	French	5,345	4.00%
3	Dutch	865	0.65%
4	German	275	0.21%
5	Spanish	220	0.16%
6	Chinese languages	190	0.14%
	Mandarin	45	0.03%
	Cantonese	15	0.01%
7	Arabic	150	0.11%
8	Hungarian	120	0.09%
9	Algonquian languages	95	0.07%
	Mi'kmaq	90	0.07%
10	Serbo-Croatian languages	85	0.07%
	Serbian	35	0.03%
	Croatian	20	0.01%
	Bosnian	15	0.01%
	Serbo-Croatian	15	0.01%
11	Japanese	80	0.06%
12	Bantu languages	70	0.05%
12	Polish	70	0.05%
14	Korean	65	0.05%
14	Scandinavian languages	65	0.05%
	Danish	40	0.03%
	Swedish	15	0.01%
	Icelandic	10	0.01%
16	Frisian	55	0.04%
16	Italian	55	0.04%
18	Flemish	40	0.03%
18	Hindi	40	0.03%
20	Creole	35	0.03%
20	Urdu	35	0.03%

There were also 30 single-language responses for Greek and Niger-Congo languages n.i.e.; 25 for Russian; 20 for Ukrainian; 15 for Finnish, Germanic languages n.i.e., Inuktitut, Maltese, Persian and Tagalog; and 10 for Czech, Estonian, Portuguese, Slovenian, Turkish and Vietnamese. In addition, there were also 105 responses of English and a non-official language; 25 of French and a non-official language; 495 of English and French; and 10 of English, French, and a non-official language. (Figures shown are for the number of single language responses and the percentage of total single-language responses.)

== Religion ==
The Roman Catholic Diocese of Charlottetown comprises the entire Island and is the second oldest English diocese in Canada. The Archdiocese of Kingston is the oldest.

Religious groups in Prince Edward Island (1981−2021)
Religious group	2021 Canadian census		2011 Canadian census		2001 Canadian census		1991 Canadian census		1981 Canadian census	
Religious group	Pop.	%	Pop.	%	Pop.	%	Pop.	%	Pop.	%
Christianity	101,755	67.62%	115,620	84.16%	123,805	92.82%	122,750	95.82%	117,675	97.07%
Irreligion	42,830	28.46%	19,820	14.43%	8,945	6.71%	4,880	3.81%	3,240	2.67%
Islam	1,720	1.14%	660	0.48%	195	0.15%	60	0.05%	70	0.06%
Hinduism	1,245	0.83%	205	0.15%	30	0.02%	25	0.02%	75	0.06%
Sikhism	1,165	0.77%	10	0.01%	0	0%	65	0.05%	0	0%
Buddhism	755	0.5%	560	0.41%	135	0.1%	60	0.05%	50	0.04%
Judaism	165	0.11%	100	0.07%	55	0.04%	85	0.07%	80	0.07%
Indigenous spirituality	75	0.05%	55	0.04%	50	0.04%	25	0.02%	0	0%
Other	765	0.51%	350	0.25%	160	0.12%	150	0.12%	35	0.03%
Total responses	150,480	97.5%	137,375	97.98%	133,385	98.59%	128,100	98.72%	121,225	98.95%
Total population	154,331	100%	140,204	100%	135,294	100%	129,765	100%	122,506	100%

== Migration ==
=== Immigration ===
Prince Edward Island immigration statistics (1841–2021)
Census year	Immigrant percentage	Immigrant population	Total responses	Total population	Source(s)
1841 Census of Prince Edward Island	32.98%	15,513	47,042	47,042	
1851 Census of Prince Edward Island	30.02%	18,819	62,678	62,678	
1861 Census of Prince Edward Island	22.05%	17,830	80,857	80,857	
1871 census of Prince Edward Island	14.62%	13,750	94,021	94,021	
1881 Canadian census	8.72%	9,494	108,891	108,891	
1891 Canadian census	5.87%	6,398	109,078	109,078	
1901 Canadian census	4.12%	4,253	103,259	103,259	
1911 Canadian census	2.75%	2,574	93,728	93,728	
1921 Canadian census	2.66%	2,365	88,815	88,815	
1931 Canadian census	3.17%	2,787	88,038	88,038	
1941 Canadian census	2.57%	2,439	95,047	95,047	
1951 Canadian census	2.61%	2,571	98,429	98,429	
1961 Canadian census	2.86%	2,992	104,629	104,629	
1971 Canadian census	3.32%	3,705	111,640	111,641	
1981 Canadian census	3.76%	4,555	121,220	122,506	
1986 Canadian census	3.46%	4,330	125,090	126,646	
1991 Canadian census	3.21%	4,110	128,100	129,765	
1996 Canadian census	3.31%	4,395	132,855	134,557	
2001 Canadian census	3.1%	4,140	133,385	135,294	
2006 Canadian census	3.56%	4,780	134,205	138,581	
2011 Canadian census	5.16%	7,085	137,375	140,204	
2016 Canadian census	6.4%	8,940	139,685	142,907	
2021 Canadian census	7.82%	11,765	150,480	154,331	

The 2021 census reported that immigrants (individuals born outside Canada) comprise 11,765 persons or 7.8 percent of the total population of Prince Edward Island.

Immigrants in Prince Edward Island by country of birth
Country of Birth	2021 census		2016 census		2011 census		2006 census		2001 census		1996 census		1991 census		1986 census		1981 census		1971 census		1961 census		1951 census		1941 census		1931 census	
Country of Birth	Pop.	%	Pop.	%	Pop.	%	Pop.	%	Pop.	%	Pop.	%	Pop.	%	Pop.	%	Pop.	%	Pop.	%	Pop.	%	Pop.	%	Pop.	%	Pop.	%
China & Taiwan	1,835 (Note: China: 1,675 / Taiwan: 160)	15.6%	1,915 (Note: China: 1,835 / Taiwan: 80)	21.4%	1,540 (Note: China: 1,490 / Taiwan: 50)	21.7%	75 (Note: China: 60 / Taiwan: 15)	1.6%	90 (Note: China: 90 / Taiwan: 0)	2.2%	115 (Note: China: 115 / Taiwan: 0)	2.6%	30 (Note: China: 30 / Taiwan: 0)	0.7%	45 (Note: China: 40 / Taiwan: 5)	1%	50 (Note: China: 10 / Taiwan: 40)	1.1%	15	0.4%	24	0.8%	26	1%	27	1.1%	24	0.9%
United Kingdom	1,385	11.8%	1,375	15.4%	1,260	17.8%	1,165	24.4%	1,050	25.4%	1,125	25.6%	1,175	28.6%	1,080	24.9%	1,345	29.5%	1,140	30.8%	959	32.1%	948	36.9%	622	25.5%	758	27.2%
United States	1,175	10%	1,205	13.5%	1,330	18.8%	1,255	26.3%	1,310	31.6%	1,260	28.7%	1,340	32.6%	1,600	37%	1,735	38.1%	1,295	35%	1,075	35.9%	1,117	43.4%	1,335	54.7%	1,380	49.5%
Philippines	1,010	8.6%	480	5.4%	50	0.7%	20	0.4%	25	0.6%	20	0.5%	0	0%	0	0%	0	0%	—N/a	—N/a	—N/a	—N/a	—N/a	—N/a	—N/a	—N/a	—N/a	—N/a
India	840	7.1%	225	2.5%	85	1.2%	55	1.2%	30	0.7%	60	1.4%	85	2.1%	95	2.2%	50	1.1%	80	2.2%	1	0%	5	0.2%	2	0.1%	6	0.2%
Syria & Lebanon	535 (Note: Syria: 400 / Lebanon: 135)	4.5%	300 (Note: Syria: 205 / Lebanon: 95)	3.4%	110 (Note: Syria: 50 / Lebanon: 60)	1.6%	100 (Note: Syria: 40 / Lebanon: 60)	2.1%	65 (Note: Syria: 10 / Lebanon: 55)	1.6%	140 (Note: Syria: 45 / Lebanon: 95)	3.2%	95 (Note: Syria: 30 / Lebanon: 65)	2.3%	125 (Note: Syria: 25 / Lebanon: 100)	2.9%	40	0.9%	—N/a	—N/a	—N/a	—N/a	—N/a	—N/a	47	1.9%	42	1.5%
Vietnam	525	4.5%	55	0.6%	70	1%	15	0.3%	15	0.4%	20	0.5%	0	0%	35	0.8%	100	2.2%	—N/a	—N/a	—N/a	—N/a	—N/a	—N/a	—N/a	—N/a	—N/a	—N/a
Netherlands	430	3.7%	470	5.3%	450	6.4%	495	10.4%	415	10%	465	10.6%	480	11.7%	445	10.3%	435	9.5%	310	8.4%	371	12.4%	116	4.5%	11	0.5%	16	0.6%
Former Yugoslavia	230	2%	150	1.7%	155	2.2%	145	3%	215	5.2%	90	2%	25	0.6%	10	0.2%	15	0.3%	15	0.4%	4	0.1%	3	0.1%	0	0%	0	0%
Germany & Austria	205 (Note: Germany: 185 / Austria: 20)	1.7%	270 (Note: Germany: 255 / Austria: 15)	3%	195 (Note: Germany: 195 / Austria: 0)	2.8%	240 (Note: Germany: 225 / Austria: 15)	5%	175 (Note: Germany: 155 / Austria: 20)	4.2%	240 (Note: Germany: 230 / Austria: 10)	5.5%	180 (Note: Germany: 170 / Austria: 10)	4.4%	270 (Note: Germany: 265 / Austria: 5)	6.2%	275 (Note: Germany: 260 / Austria: 15)	6%	330	8.9%	133	4.4%	23	0.9%	14	0.6%	17	0.6%
Iran	185	1.6%	230	2.6%	305	4.3%	15	0.3%	15	0.4%	15	0.3%	10	0.2%	0	0%	5	0.1%	—N/a	—N/a	—N/a	—N/a	—N/a	—N/a	—N/a	—N/a	—N/a	—N/a
Russia & Ukraine	180 (Note: Russia: 105 / Ukraine: 75)	1.5%	125 (Note: Russia: 80 / Ukraine: 45)	1.4%	50 (Note: Russia: 50 / Ukraine: 0)	0.7%	20 (Note: Russia: 10 / Ukraine: 10)	0.4%	20 (Note: Russia: 10 / Ukraine: 10)	0.5%	40 (Note: Includes total persons born in all republics of the Soviet Union.)	0.9%	10	0.2%	5	0.1%	20	0.4%	20	0.5%	46	1.5%	6	0.2%	8	0.3%	11	0.4%
France & Belgium	165 (Note: France: 110 / Belgium: 55)	1.4%	140 (Note: France: 55 / Belgium: 85)	1.6%	100 (Note: France: 35 / Belgium: 65)	1.4%	100 (Note: France: 20 / Belgium: 80)	2.1%	65 (Note: France: 45 / Belgium: 20)	1.6%	85 (Note: France: 45 / Belgium: 40)	1.9%	55 (Note: France: 30 / Belgium: 25)	1.3%	75 (Note: France: 25 / Belgium: 50)	1.7%	75 (Note: France: 25 / Belgium: 50)	1.6%	130	3.5%	61	2%	16	0.6%	6	0.2%	8	0.3%
Jamaica & Trinidad and Tobago	150 (Note: Jamaica: 125 / Trinidad and Tobago: 25)	1.3%	50 (Note: Jamaica: 30 / Trinidad and Tobago: 20)	0.6%	20 (Note: Jamaica: 20 / Trinidad and Tobago: 0)	0.3%	40 (Note: Jamaica: 30 / Trinidad and Tobago: 10)	0.8%	15 (Note: Jamaica: 15 / Trinidad and Tobago: 0)	0.4%	40 (Note: Jamaica: 30 / Trinidad and Tobago: 10)	0.9%	15 (Note: Jamaica: 15 / Trinidad and Tobago: 0)	0.4%	25 (Note: Jamaica: 5 / Trinidad and Tobago: 20)	0.6%	10	0.2%	10	0.3%	6 (Note: All individuals born in the British West Indies.)	0.2%	4	0.2%	10	0.4%	11	0.4%
Hong Kong	125	1.1%	100	1.1%	30	0.4%	25	0.5%	20	0.5%	100	2.3%	15	0.4%	25	0.6%	15	0.3%	—N/a	—N/a	—N/a	—N/a	—N/a	—N/a	—N/a	—N/a	—N/a	—N/a
South Africa	120	1%	65	0.7%	20	0.3%	25	0.5%	15	0.4%	10	0.2%	10	0.2%	5	0.1%	5	0.1%	—N/a	—N/a	3	0.1%	1	0%	2	0.1%	3	0.1%
Nigeria & Ghana	110 (Note: Nigeria: 110 / Ghana: 0)	0.9%	75 (Note: Nigeria: 65 / Ghana: 10)	0.8%	0	0%	0	0%	10 (Note: Nigeria: 10 / Ghana: 0)	0.2%	30 (Note: Nigeria: 20 / Ghana: 10)	0.7%	0	0%	5	0.1%	0	0%	—N/a	—N/a	—N/a	—N/a	—N/a	—N/a	—N/a	—N/a	—N/a	—N/a
Poland	95	0.8%	55	0.6%	40	0.6%	45	0.9%	50	1.2%	25	0.6%	50	1.2%	55	1.3%	20	0.4%	45	1.2%	23	0.8%	33	1.3%	3	0.1%	0	0%
Japan	90	0.8%	40	0.4%	90	1.3%	50	1%	40	1%	25	0.6%	10	0.2%	0	0%	0	0%	15	0.4%	1	0%	3	0.1%	0	0%	0	0%
Brazil	85	0.7%	20	0.2%	50	0.7%	0	0%	10	0.2%	10	0.2%	0	0%	10	0.2%	10	0.2%	—N/a	—N/a	—N/a	—N/a	—N/a	—N/a	—N/a	—N/a	—N/a	—N/a
Ireland	85	0.7%	50	0.6%	40	0.6%	20	0.4%	40	1%	50	1.1%	25	0.6%	30	0.7%	20	0.4%	80	2.2%	89	3%	79	3.1%	76	3.1%	152	5.5%
Bangladesh	85	0.7%	10	0.1%	30	0.4%	10	0.2%	10	0.2%	10	0.2%	0	0%	0	0%	0	0%	—N/a	—N/a	—N/a	—N/a	—N/a	—N/a	—N/a	—N/a	—N/a	—N/a
Pakistan	85	0.7%	50	0.6%	45	0.6%	10	0.2%	25	0.6%	10	0.2%	10	0.2%	45	1%	10	0.2%	10	0.3%	—N/a	—N/a	—N/a	—N/a	—N/a	—N/a	—N/a	—N/a
Portugal	80	0.7%	70	0.8%	30	0.4%	10	0.2%	20	0.5%	25	0.6%	15	0.4%	35	0.8%	35	0.8%	0	0%	—N/a	—N/a	—N/a	—N/a	—N/a	—N/a	—N/a	—N/a
Myanmar	80	0.7%	10	0.1%	25	0.4%	0	0%	10	0.2%	0	0%	0	0%	0	0%	0	0%	—N/a	—N/a	—N/a	—N/a	—N/a	—N/a	—N/a	—N/a	—N/a	—N/a
Italy	75	0.6%	65	0.7%	15	0.2%	15	0.3%	10	0.2%	20	0.5%	10	0.2%	30	0.7%	20	0.4%	10	0.3%	23	0.8%	2	0.1%	3	0.1%	5	0.2%
Scandinavia (Note: Includes Denmark, Finland, Iceland, Norway and Sweden.)	70	0.6%	95	1.1%	75	1.1%	85	1.8%	45	1.1%	50	1.1%	75	1.8%	50	1.2%	85	1.9%	50	1.3%	92	3.1%	67	2.6%	66	2.7%	112	4%
United Arab Emirates	70	0.6%	20	0.2%	0	0%	0	0%	0	0%	0	0%	—N/a	—N/a	—N/a	—N/a	—N/a	—N/a	—N/a	—N/a	—N/a	—N/a	—N/a	—N/a	—N/a	—N/a	—N/a	—N/a
Sri Lanka	65	0.6%	40	0.4%	45	0.6%	0	0%	0	0%	0	0%	0	0%	0	0%	0	0%	—N/a	—N/a	—N/a	—N/a	—N/a	—N/a	—N/a	—N/a	—N/a	—N/a
Australia & New Zealand	65	0.6%	25	0.3%	15	0.2%	130	2.7%	30	0.7%	20	0.5%	20	0.5%	25	0.6%	15	0.3%	15	0.4%	7	0.2%	7	0.3%	8	0.3%	8	0.3%
Morocco	60	0.5%	15	0.2%	0	0%	10	0.2%	10	0.2%	0	0%	0	0%	0	0%	5	0.1%	—N/a	—N/a	—N/a	—N/a	—N/a	—N/a	—N/a	—N/a	—N/a	—N/a
Bahamas	55	0.5%	10	0.1%	0	0%	0	0%	0	0%	20	0.5%	5	0.1%	0	0%	0	0%	—N/a	—N/a	—N/a	—N/a	—N/a	—N/a	—N/a	—N/a	—N/a	—N/a
Switzerland	55	0.5%	20	0.2%	20	0.3%	20	0.4%	20	0.5%	20	0.5%	60	1.5%	10	0.2%	30	0.7%	25	0.7%	4	0.1%	6	0.2%	7	0.3%	4	0.1%
Egypt	55	0.5%	70	0.8%	10	0.1%	10	0.2%	0	0%	25	0.6%	10	0.2%	35	0.8%	0	0%	—N/a	—N/a	—N/a	—N/a	—N/a	—N/a	—N/a	—N/a	—N/a	—N/a
El Salvador & Guatemala & Nicaragua	55 (Note: El Salvador: 40 / Guatemala: 15 / Nicaragua: 0)	0.5%	30 (Note: El Salvador: 0 / Guatemala: 30 / Nicaragua: 0)	0.3%	45 (Note: El Salvador: 45 / Guatemala: 0 / Nicaragua: 0)	0.6%	30 (Note: El Salvador: 30 / Guatemala: 0 / Nicaragua: 0)	0.6%	25 (Note: El Salvador: 0 / Guatemala: 25 / Nicaragua: 0)	0.6%	0	0%	55 (Note: El Salvador: 55 / Guatemala: 0 / Nicaragua: 0)	1.3%	0	0%	5	0.1%	—N/a	—N/a	—N/a	—N/a	—N/a	—N/a	—N/a	—N/a	—N/a	—N/a
Iraq	55	0.5%	20	0.2%	35	0.5%	10	0.2%	25	0.6%	10	0.2%	0	0%	0	0%	0	0%	—N/a	—N/a	—N/a	—N/a	—N/a	—N/a	—N/a	—N/a	—N/a	—N/a
Nepal	50	0.4%	115	1.3%	35	0.5%	0	0%	0	0%	0	0%	0	0%	0	0%	0	0%	—N/a	—N/a	—N/a	—N/a	—N/a	—N/a	—N/a	—N/a	—N/a	—N/a
Mexico	50	0.4%	20	0.2%	40	0.6%	10	0.2%	15	0.4%	10	0.2%	30	0.7%	0	0%	0	0%	—N/a	—N/a	—N/a	—N/a	—N/a	—N/a	—N/a	—N/a	—N/a	—N/a
Bulgaria	50	0.4%	0	0%	0	0%	0	0%	0	0%	0	0%	0	0%	0	0%	0	0%	—N/a	—N/a	—N/a	—N/a	—N/a	—N/a	0	0%	0	0%
Hungary	45	0.4%	60	0.7%	15	0.2%	40	0.8%	50	1.2%	35	0.8%	25	0.6%	20	0.5%	10	0.2%	0	0%	3	0.1%	7	0.3%	0	0%	3	0.1%
Kenya & Tanzania & Uganda	45 (Note: Kenya: 25 / Tanzania: 20 / Uganda: 0)	0.4%	30 (Note: Kenya: 10 / Tanzania: 10 / Uganda: 10)	0.3%	0	0%	15 (Note: Kenya: 15 / Tanzania: 0 / Uganda: 0)	0.3%	0	0%	0	0%	25 (Note: Kenya: 0 / Tanzania: 0 / Uganda: 25)	0.6%	5 (Note: Kenya: 0 / Tanzania: 5 / Uganda: 0)	0.1%	10	0.2%	—N/a	—N/a	—N/a	—N/a	—N/a	—N/a	—N/a	—N/a	—N/a	—N/a
South Korea	40	0.3%	100	1.1%	80	1.1%	70	1.5%	10	0.2%	15	0.3%	0	0%	0	0%	0	0%	—N/a	—N/a	—N/a	—N/a	—N/a	—N/a	—N/a	—N/a	—N/a	—N/a
Colombia	40	0.3%	55	0.6%	10	0.1%	70	1.5%	0	0%	0	0%	0	0%	0	0%	0	0%	—N/a	—N/a	—N/a	—N/a	—N/a	—N/a	—N/a	—N/a	—N/a	—N/a
Czech Republic & Slovakia	40	0.3%	40	0.4%	10	0.1%	25	0.5%	15	0.4%	35	0.8%	30	0.7%	15	0.3%	15	0.3%	15	0.4%	11	0.4%	12	0.5%	1	0%	3	0.1%
Saudi Arabia	40	0.3%	10	0.1%	25	0.4%	0	0%	0	0%	0	0%	—N/a	—N/a	—N/a	—N/a	—N/a	—N/a	—N/a	—N/a	—N/a	—N/a	—N/a	—N/a	—N/a	—N/a	—N/a	—N/a
Chile	35	0.3%	10	0.1%	10	0.1%	10	0.2%	20	0.5%	10	0.2%	10	0.2%	10	0.2%	10	0.2%	—N/a	—N/a	—N/a	—N/a	—N/a	—N/a	—N/a	—N/a	—N/a	—N/a
Malaysia & Singapore	30 (Note: Malaysia: 0 / Singapore: 30)	0.3%	45 (Note: Malaysia: 10 / Singapore: 35)	0.5%	25 (Note: Malaysia: 0 / Singapore: 25)	0.4%	0	0%	10 (Note: Malaysia: 0 / Singapore: 10)	0.2%	0	0%	10 (Note: Malaysia: 10 / Singapore: 0)	0.2%	5 (Note: Malaysia: 5 / Singapore: 0)	0.1%	—N/a	—N/a	—N/a	—N/a	—N/a	—N/a	—N/a	—N/a	—N/a	—N/a	—N/a	—N/a
Romania	30	0.3%	15	0.2%	25	0.4%	10	0.2%	10	0.2%	10	0.2%	10	0.2%	10	0.2%	5	0.1%	5	0.1%	2	0.1%	2	0.1%	0	0%	0	0%
Israel & Palestine	25	0.2%	30	0.3%	0	0%	30	0.6%	20	0.5%	40	0.9%	15	0.4%	0	0%	15	0.3%	—N/a	—N/a	—N/a	—N/a	—N/a	—N/a	—N/a	—N/a	—N/a	—N/a
DR Congo & Cameroon	15 (Note: DR Congo: 15 / Cameroon: 0)	0.1%	25 (Note: DR Congo: 15 / Cameroon: 10)	0.3%	0	0%	10 (Note: DR Congo: 0 / Cameroon: 10)	0.2%	0	0%	0	0%	0	0%	0	0%	0	0%	—N/a	—N/a	—N/a	—N/a	—N/a	—N/a	—N/a	—N/a	—N/a	—N/a
Total immigrants	11,765	7.8%	8,940	6.4%	7,085	5.2%	4,780	3.6%	4,140	3.1%	4,395	3.3%	4,110	3.2%	4,330	3.5%	4,555	3.8%	3,705	3.3%	2,992	2.9%	2,571	2.6%	2,439	2.6%	2,787	3.2%
Total responses	150,480	97.5%	139,685	97.7%	137,375	98%	134,205	96.8%	133,385	98.6%	132,855	98.7%	128,100	98.7%	125,090	98.8%	121,220	99%	111,640	100%	104,629	100%	98,429	100%	95,047	100%	88,038	100%
Total population	154,331	100%	142,907	100%	140,204	100%	138,581	100%	135,294	100%	134,557	100%	129,765	100%	126,646	100%	122,506	100%	111,641	100%	104,629	100%	98,429	100%	95,047	100%	88,038	100%

=== Recent immigration ===
The 2021 Canadian census counted a total of 4,860 people who immigrated to Prince Edward Island between 2016 and 2021.

Recent immigrants to Prince Edward Island by country of birth (2016 to 2021)
Country of birth	Population	% recent immigrants
China	1,170	24.1%
India	665	13.7%
Philippines	630	13%
Vietnam	475	9.8%
Syria	220	4.5%
United States	140	2.9%
United Kingdom	130	2.7%
Jamaica	105	2.2%
Nigeria	85	1.7%
Hong Kong	65	1.3%
Bahamas	55	1.1%
Brazil	50	1%
United Arab Emirates	50	1%
France	45	0.9%
Russia	45	0.9%
Bangladesh	45	0.9%
Iraq	40	0.8%
Taiwan	40	0.8%
Colombia	35	0.7%
Egypt	35	0.7%
Mexico	30	0.6%
Ukraine	30	0.6%
Italy	30	0.6%
South Africa	30	0.6%
Lebanon	30	0.6%
Total recent immigrants	4,860	100%

=== Interprovincial migration ===
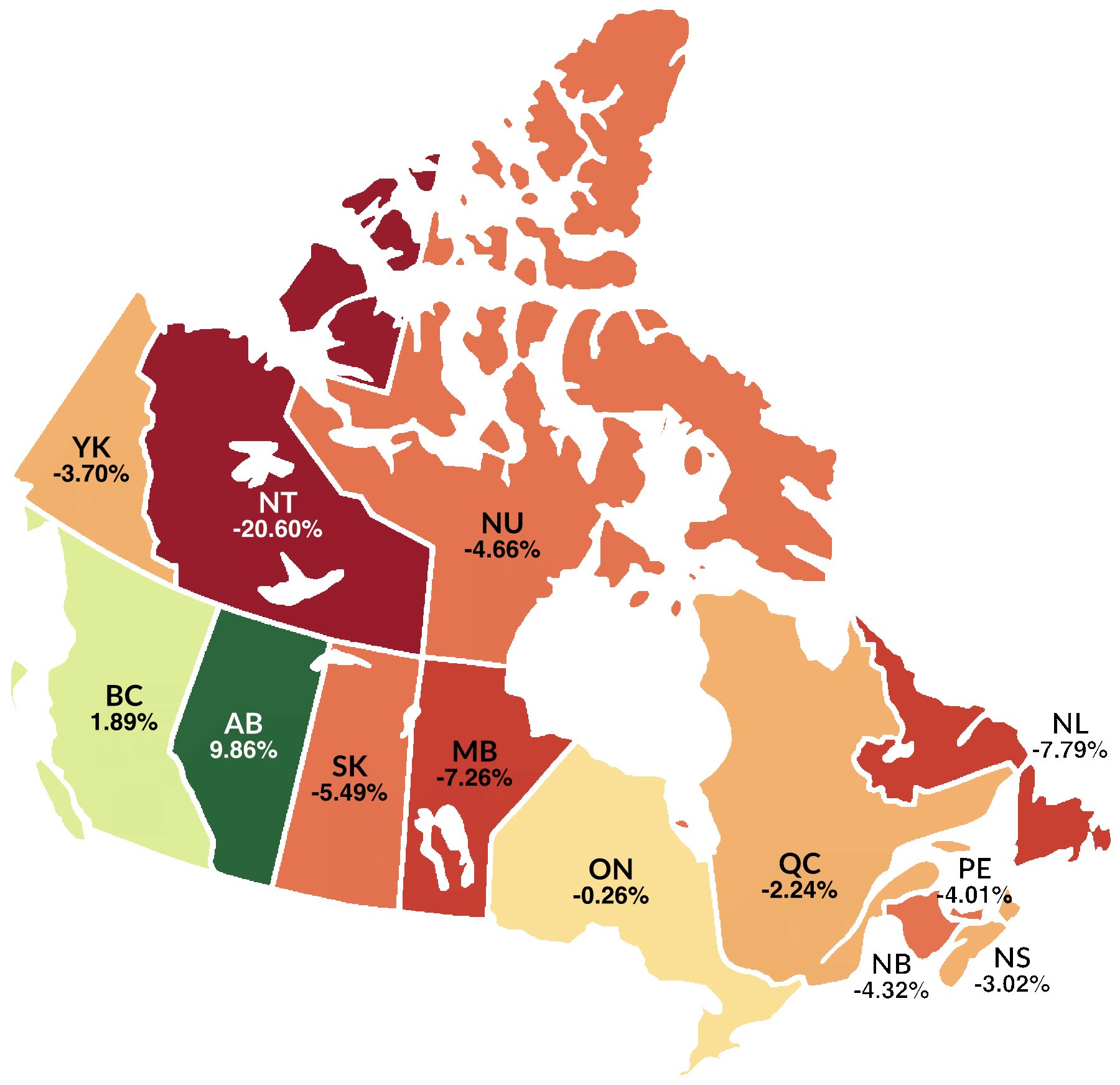
Net cumulative interprovincial migration per Province from 1997 to 2017, as a share of population of each Provinces

Since 1971, Prince Edward Island mostly had years of positive interprovincial migration. However, in the 2010s, it turned to the negative. This interprovincial migration exceeded all immigration to the province in 2015.

Interprovincial migration in Prince Edward Island
	In-migrants	Out-migrants	Net migration
2008–2009	2,522	3,058	−536
2009–2010	2,709	2,649	60
2010–2011	2,494	2,704	−210
2011–2012	2,620	3,238	−618
2012–2013	2,294	3,195	−901
2013–2014	2,198	3,139	−941
2014–2015	2,367	3,049	−682
2015–2016	2,874	2,844	30
2016–2017	3,124	2,680	444
2017–2018	3,193	3,016	177
2018–2019	3,922	3,793	129

Source: Statistics Canada

== See also ==
- Demographics of Canada
- Population of Canada by province and territory
