= Lot 19, Prince Edward Island =

Township in Canada

- Township
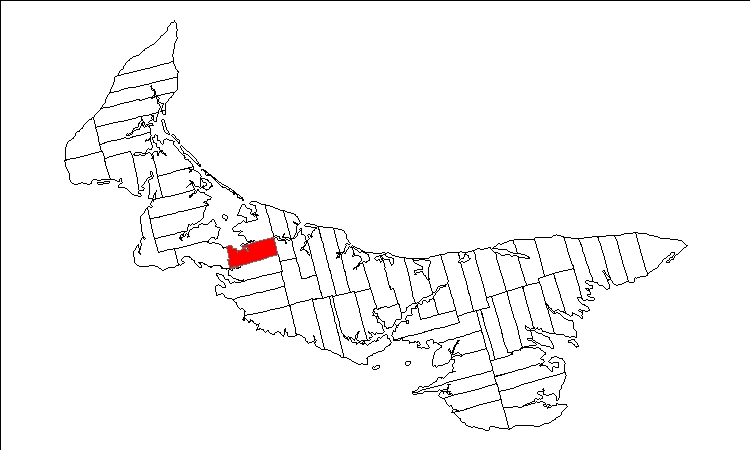
- Map of Prince Edward Island highlighting Lot 19
- Coordinates: 46°26′N 63°40′W
- Country: Canada
- Province: Prince Edward Island
- County: Prince County
- Parish: St. David's Parish

Area
  - Total: 65.70 km^{2} (25.37 sq mi)

Population (2011)
  - Total: 1,903
  - Density: 28.7/km^{2} (74/sq mi)
- Time zone: UTC-4 (AST)
  - Summer (DST): UTC-3 (ADT)
- Canadian Postal code: C0B
- Area code: 902
- NTS Map: 011L05
- GNBC Code: BAERF

Lot 19 is a township in Prince County, Prince Edward Island, Canada. It is part of St. David's Parish. Lot 19 was awarded to brothers John and Walter Patterson in the 1767 land lottery. One quarter was granted to Loyalists in 1783.

== Communities ==
Incorporated municipalities:

- Kensington
- Sherbrooke
- Summerside

Civic address communities:

- Burlington
- Clermont
- Kelvin Grove
- Kensington
- Margate
- New Annan
- Norboro
- Sherbrooke
- Summerside
- Travellers Rest
- Wilmot Valley

== Demographics ==
Historical population
Year	Pop.	±%
1871	1,371	—
1881	1,608	+17.3%
1891	1,753	+9.0%
1901	1,687	−3.8%
1911	1,519	−10.0%
1921	1,183	−22.1%
1931	1,194	+0.9%
1941	1,238	+3.7%
2001	1,775	+43.4%
2006	1,888	+6.4%
2011	1,886 (Note: revised)	−0.1%
2016	1,803	−4.4%

The unincorporated communities of Travellers Rest, New Annan, Wilmot Valley and Kelvin Grove in the western part of the township is one of the few areas in Prince County experiencing a modest rate of growth, largely due to their geographic proximity to the town of Kensington and the city of Summerside.
