= Lot 27, Prince Edward Island =

- Township
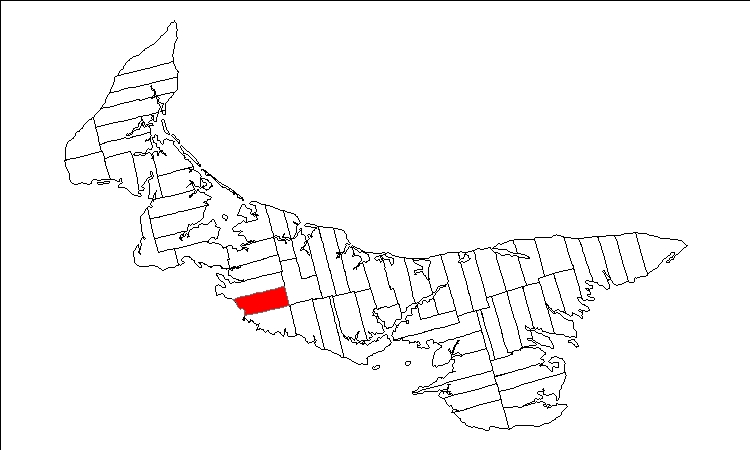
- Map of Prince Edward Island highlighting Lot 27
- Coordinates: 46°18′N 63°37′W
- Country: Canada
- Province: Prince Edward Island
- County: Prince County
- Parish: St. David's Parish.

Area
  - Total: 75.97 km^{2} (29.33 sq mi)

Population (2006)
  - Total: 780
  - Density: 10.3/km^{2} (27/sq mi)
- Time zone: UTC-4 (AST)
  - Summer (DST): UTC-3 (ADT)
- Canadian Postal code: C0A
- Area code: 902
- NTS Map: 011L05
- GNBC Code: BAERN

Lot 27 is a township in Prince County, Prince Edward Island, Canada. It is part of St. David's Parish. Lot 27 was awarded to merchants James Searle and John Russell Spence in the 1767 land lottery.

== Communities ==
Incorporated municipalities:

- Borden-Carleton
- Kinkora

Civic address communities:

- Albany
- Borden-Carleton
- Chelton
- Kinkora
- Maple Plains
- Middleton
- Mount Tryon
- North Carleton
- Searletown
- Shamrock

== Demographics ==
Historical population
Year	Pop.	±%
1871	1,269	—
1881	1,348	+6.2%
1891	1,425	+5.7%
1901	1,281	−10.1%
1911	1,113	−13.1%
1921	1,122	+0.8%
1931	1,258	+12.1%
1941	1,292	+2.7%
2006	780	−39.6%
