= Joseph Arsenault =

Joseph Arsenault may refer to:

- Joseph-Octave Arsenault (1828–1897), Canadian merchant and politician from Prince Edward Island
- Joseph-Félix Arsenault (1865–1947), Canadian merchant and politician, son of the above
- Joseph F. H. Arsenault (1866–1946), Canadian merchant and politician from Prince Edward Island
