= Lot 28, Prince Edward Island =

- Township
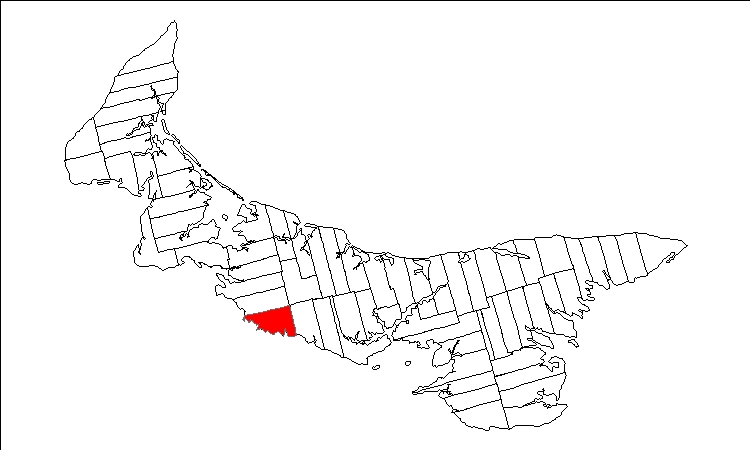
- Map of Prince Edward Island highlighting Lot 28
- Coordinates: 46°15′N 63°35′W
- Country: Canada
- Province: Prince Edward Island
- County: Prince County
- Parish: St. David's Parish.

Area
  - Total: 78.80 km^{2} (30.42 sq mi)

Population (2006)
  - Total: 813
  - Density: 10.3/km^{2} (27/sq mi)
- Time zone: UTC-4 (AST)
  - Summer (DST): UTC-3 (ADT)
- Canadian Postal code: C0A
- Area code: 902
- NTS Map: 011L05
- GNBC Code: BAERO

Lot 28 is a township in Prince County, Prince Edward Island, Canada. It is part of St. David's Parish. Lot 28 was awarded to Samuel Holland in the 1767 land lottery.

== Communities ==
Incorporated municipalities:

- Borden-Carleton
- Crapaud
- Victoria

Civic address communities:

- Albany
- Augustine Cove
- Borden-Carleton
- Cape Traverse
- Crapaud
- Lady Fane
- Maple Plains
- Mount Tryon
- North Tryon
- Tryon
- Victoria

== Demographics ==
Historical population
Year	Pop.	±%
1871	1,570	—
1881	1,692	+7.8%
1891	1,578	−6.7%
1901	1,620	+2.7%
1911	1,473	−9.1%
1921	1,471	−0.1%
1931	1,459	−0.8%
1941	1,361	−6.7%
2006	813	−40.3%
