= Lot 25, Prince Edward Island =

- Township
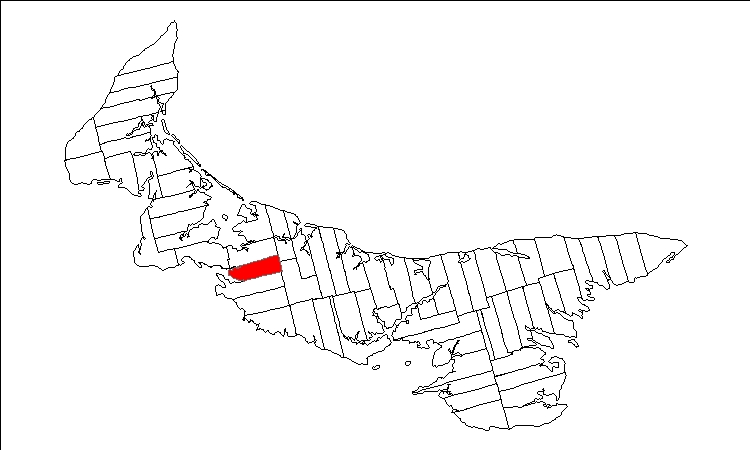
- Map of Prince Edward Island highlighting Lot 25
- Coordinates: 46°24′N 63°40′W
- Country: Canada
- Province: Prince Edward Island
- County: Prince County
- Parish: St. David's Parish.

Area
  - Total: 72.17 km^{2} (27.86 sq mi)

Population (2006)
  - Total: 1,156
  - Density: 16/km^{2} (41/sq mi)
- Time zone: UTC-4 (AST)
  - Summer (DST): UTC-3 (ADT)
- Canadian Postal code: C0A
- Area code: 902
- NTS Map: 011L05
- GNBC Code: BAERL

Lot 25 is a township in Prince County, Prince Edward Island, Canada. It is part of St. David's Parish. Lot 25 was awarded to Archibald Kennedy and James Campbell in the 1767 land lottery. One half was sold for arrears in quitrent in 1781.

== Communities ==
Incorporated municipalities:

- none

Civic address communities:

- Central Bedeque
- Freetown
- Kelvin Grove
- Lower Freetown
- Norboro
- North Bedeque
- South Freetown
- Springfield
- Wilmot Valley

== Demographics ==
Historical population
| Year | Pop. | ±% |
|---|---|---|
| 1871 | 925 | — |
| 1881 | 1,002 | +8.3% |
| 1891 | 1,017 | +1.5% |
| 1901 | 945 | −7.1% |
| 1911 | 804 | −14.9% |
| 1921 | 816 | +1.5% |
| 1931 | 919 | +12.6% |
| 1941 | 924 | +0.5% |
| 2006 | 1,156 | +25.1% |
