= Lot 13, Prince Edward Island =

Lot 13
- Township
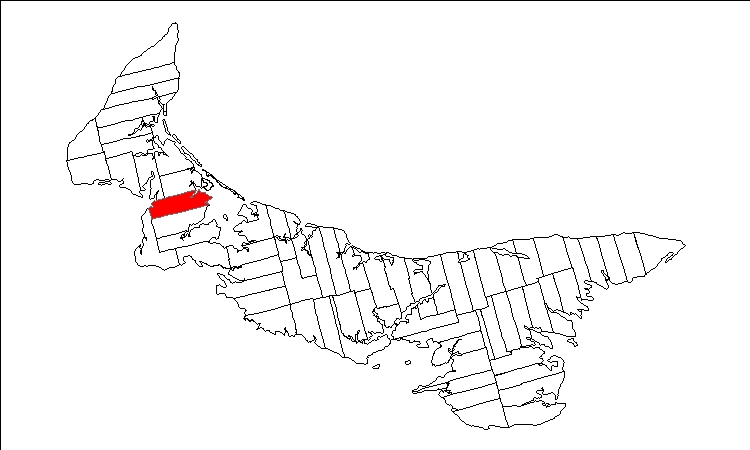
- Map of Prince Edward Island highlighting Lot 13
- Coordinates: 46°34′N 63°59′W
- Country: Canada
- Province: Prince Edward Island
- County: Prince County
- Parish: Richmond Parish

Area
  - Total: 89.07 km^{2} (34.39 sq mi)

Population (2006)
  - Total: 721
  - Density: 8.1/km^{2} (21/sq mi)
- Time zone: UTC-4 (AST)
  - Summer (DST): UTC-3 (ADT)
- Canadian Postal code: C0B
- Area code: 902
- NTS Map: 011L12
- GNBC Code: BAEQZ

Lot 13 is a township in Prince County, Prince Edward Island, Canada. It is part of Richmond Parish. Lot 13 was awarded to John Pownall, Secretary to the Lords of Trade in the 1767 land lottery; and passed to the Marquess of Hertford by 1796.

== Communities ==
Incorporated municipalities:

- Ellerslie-Bideford
- Lady Slipper
- Tyne Valley

Civic address communities:

- Birch Hill
- Ellerslie-Bideford
- Enmore
- Harmony
- Mount Pleasant
- Northam
- Port Hill
- Springhill
- Tyne Valley
- Victoria West

== Demographics ==
Historical population
Year	Pop.	±%
1871	1,103	—
1881	1,379	+25.0%
1891	1,379	+0.0%
1901	1,222	−11.4%
1911	1,170	−4.3%
1921	1,082	−7.5%
1931	1,058	−2.2%
1941	1,158	+9.5%
2006	721	−37.7%
