= Lot 14, Prince Edward Island =

Lot 14
- Township
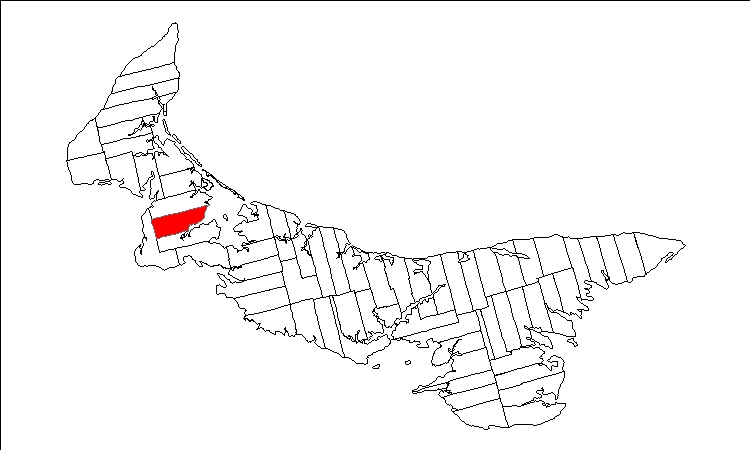
- Map of Prince Edward Island highlighting Lot 14
- Coordinates: 46°30′N 63°59′W
- Country: Canada
- Province: Prince Edward Island
- County: Prince County
- Parish: Richmond Parish

Area
  - Total: 87.96 km^{2} (33.96 sq mi)

Population (2006)
  - Total: 760
  - Density: 8.6/km^{2} (22/sq mi)
- Time zone: UTC-4 (AST)
  - Summer (DST): UTC-3 (ADT)
- Canadian Postal code: C0B
- Area code: 902
- NTS Map: 011L12
- GNBC Code: BAERA

Lot 14 is a township in Prince County, Prince Edward Island, Canada. It is part of Richmond Parish. Lot 14 was awarded to Captain John Campbell, RN in the 1767 land lottery.

== Communities ==
Incorporated municipalities:

- Lady Slipper

Civic address communities:

- Arlington
- Bayside
- Birch Hill
- Grand River
- Harmony
- Richmond
- St-Gilbert
- St-Hubert
- St-Philippe
- Urbainville
- Wellington Centre
- Wellington

== Demographics ==
Historical population
Year	Pop.	±%
1871	1,252	—
1881	1,433	+14.5%
1891	1,502	+4.8%
1901	1,488	−0.9%
1911	1,298	−12.8%
1921	1,152	−11.2%
1931	1,056	−8.3%
1941	1,114	+5.5%
2006	760	−31.8%
