= Lot 15, Prince Edward Island =

Township in Canada

Lot 15
- Township
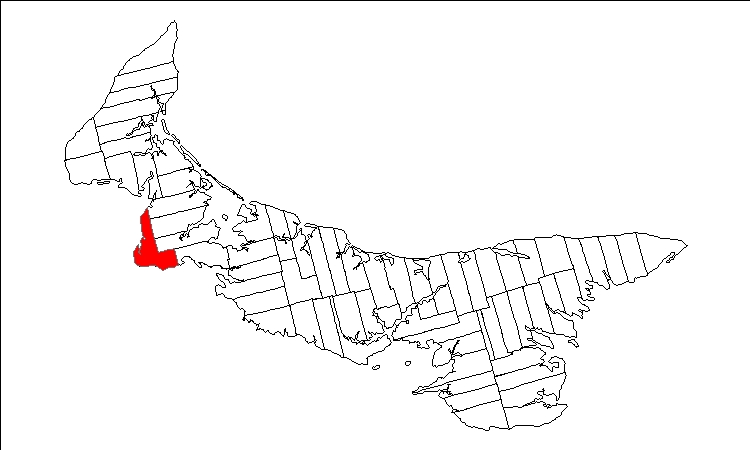
- Map of Prince Edward Island highlighting Lot 15
- Coordinates: 46°26′N 64°5′W
- Country: Canada
- Province: Prince Edward Island
- County: Prince County
- Parish: Richmond Parish

Area
  - Total: 94.58 km^{2} (36.52 sq mi)

Population (2016)
  - Total: 1,113
  - Density: 11.8/km^{2} (31/sq mi)
- Time zone: UTC-4 (AST)
  - Summer (DST): UTC-3 (ADT)
- Canadian Postal code: C0B
- Area code: 902
- NTS Map: 021I08
- GNBC Code: BAERB

Lot 15 is a township in Prince County, Prince Edward Island, Canada. It is part of Richmond Parish. Lot 15 was awarded to Guy Carleton, 1st Baron Dorchester in the 1767 land lottery.

The township is the only part of the province to have a Francophone majority. According to the 2016 Canadian Census, 780 declared that they spoke English and French, 10 declared they were French monolinguals, and 325 declared they were English monolinguals.

== Communities ==
Incorporated municipalities:

- Abrams Village
- St-Nicholas

Civic address communities:

- Abrams Village
- Baie-Egmont
- Cap-Egmont
- Maximeville
- Mont-Carmel
- St-Chrysostome
- St-Gilbert
- St-Nicholas
- St-Philippe
- St-Raphael
- St-Timothee
- Union Corner
- Urbainville
- Victoria West

== Demographics ==
Historical population
Year	Pop.	±%
1871	1,550	—
1881	1,908	+23.1%
1891	2,062	+8.1%
1901	2,516	+22.0%
1911	2,189	−13.0%
1921	1,630	−25.5%
1931	1,514	−7.1%
1941	1,665	+10.0%
2016	1,113	−33.2%
