= Joseph F. H. Arsenault =

Canadian politician

- Born: February 15, 1866; Urbainville, Lot 14
- Died: January 28, 1946

Joseph Félix H. Arsenault (February 15, 1866 – January 28, 1946) was a merchant and political figure in Prince Edward Island. He represented 3rd Prince in the Legislative Assembly of Prince Edward Island from 1904 to 1908 as a Liberal member.

== Biography ==
He was born in Urbainville, Lot 14, the son of Herbert Arsenault, and was educated in Egmont Bay. Arsenault lived in the United States for a few years before returning to the island and opening a general store and a lobster cannery. Arsenault was a justice of the peace. He was also a postmaster. He married Emily Bernard in 1892. Arsenault was an unsuccessful candidate in 1900, running against Joseph-Félix Arsenault. He was defeated by Aubin-Edmond Arsenault when he ran for reelection in 1908. Arsenault died in Charlottetown at the age of 79.
