= Lot 16, Prince Edward Island =

Township in Canada

Lot 16
- Township
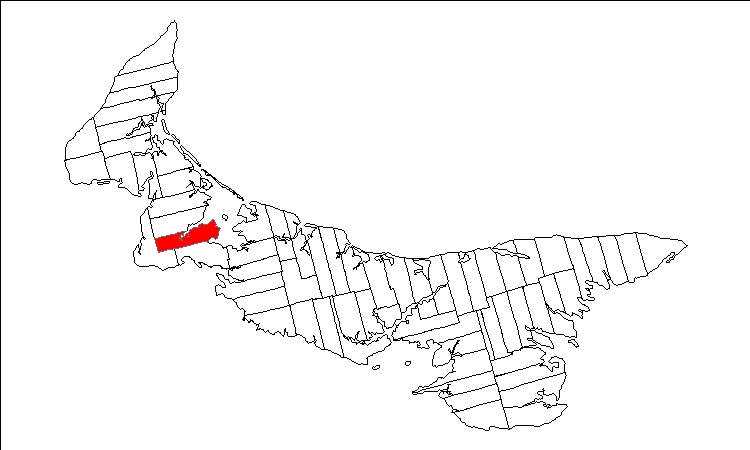
- Map of Prince Edward Island highlighting Lot 16
- Coordinates: 46°28′N 63°56′W
- Country: Canada
- Province: Prince Edward Island
- County: Prince County
- Parish: Richmond Parish

Area
  - Total: 78.93 km^{2} (30.48 sq mi)

Population (2006)
  - Total: 702
  - Density: 8.9/km^{2} (23/sq mi)
- Time zone: UTC-4 (AST)
  - Summer (DST): UTC-3 (ADT)
- Canadian Postal code: C0B
- Area code: 902

Lot 16 (pop. 550) is a township in Prince County, Prince Edward Island, Canada. It is part of Richmond Parish.

== Communities ==
Incorporated municipalities:

- St-Nicholas
- Wellington

Civic address communities:

- Belmont Lot 16
- Central Lot 16
- Miscouche
- Southwest Lot 16
- St-Nicholas
- St-Raphael
- Urbainville
- Wellington
- Wellington Centre

== History ==
Lot 16 was awarded to three junior officers in the 1767 land lottery; and one quarter was granted to Loyalists in 1775.

The communities of Belmont Lot 16, Central Lot 16 and Southwest Lot 16 are some of the few communities in the province that use part of Samuel Holland's original township designation in their geographic name.

The Belmont United Baptist Church is located in Belmont Lot 16 and the Central Lot 16 United Church is located in Central Lot 16. It also has three cemeteries (Methodist, United, and Baptist).

The Lot 16 Community Hall is located in Central Lot 16 and is a meeting place for community groups such as 4-H, Lot 16 Seniors Club, and the Women's Institute.

Belmont Provincial Park is located in Belmont Lot 16. It is a day-use park located at Winchester Cape, a headland extending off the south shore of Malpeque Bay.

== Economy ==
Agriculture is the main industry in Lot 16, with a large proportion of residents involved in primary agricultural production. The most popular commodities are dairy, beef, potato, and grain production. It is also home to a few small businesses that are primarily machinery related.

== Demographics ==
Historical population
Year	Pop.	±%
1871	934	—
1881	1,101	+17.9%
1891	1,333	+21.1%
1901	1,282	−3.8%
1911	1,045	−18.5%
1921	1,012	−3.2%
1931	1,035	+2.3%
1941	1,084	+4.7%
2006	702	−35.2%
