= Belmont, Prince Edward Island =

Coordinates: 46°29′41.1″N 63°49′13″W

- Rural Community
- Interactive map of Belmont, Prince Edward Island
- Country: Canada
- Province: Prince Edward Island
- County: Prince County
- Parish: North Parish
- Township: Lot 16
  - Summer (DST): UTC-3

Belmont (pop. 150) is a Canadian rural farming community located in the larger community of Lot 16 in central Prince County, Prince Edward Island. Lot 16 is actually three communities: Belmont, Central, and Southwest Lot 16, and is one of the last communities on Prince Edward Island to continue using their lot designation from the original Island survey by Samuel Holland in the 18th century.

The community is situated at the southwestern shore of Malpeque Bay and its primary industry is agriculture, notably dairy and beef cattle, as well as potato and grain crops.

Author Lucy Maud Montgomery taught at the Belmont School during the early 20th century. This one room schoolhouse now resides at Avonlea Village in Cavendish, PEI.

Residents of Belmont are largely of English, Scottish, Irish, and French ancestry, with recent immigrants from other backgrounds.

Belmont is also home to Belmont Provincial Park, a day-use park located at Winchester Cape, jutting into the bottom of Malpeque Bay alongside the Grand River, a salt-water estuary of Malpeque Bay. Lobster, mussels and oysters are fished along the coast of Belmont, but Belmont is not home to a harbour or wharf.

The only public building in Belmont is its only church, the Belmont United Baptist Church, which maintains a cemetery about 1 km away.
