= Cavendish Farms =

Private Canadian company owned by KC Irving family

- Company type: Private company
- Industry: Agribusiness
- Founded: 1980; 46 years ago
- Headquarters: Dieppe, New Brunswick, Canada
- Key people: James K. Irving (CEO)
- Parent: Irving Group
- Website: www.cavendishfarms.com

Cavendish Farms is a Canadian food processing company and subsidiary of the J. D. Irving group of companies. Its headquarters are in Dieppe, New Brunswick and potato processing plants in New Annan, Prince Edward Island, Lethbridge, Alberta, and Jamestown, North Dakota, and an appetizer plant in Wheatley, Ontario. It is the 4th largest processor of frozen potato products in North America. It was established in 1980. The New Annan facility employs about 700 people. It is one of the largest employers in Prince Edward Island. Cavendish Farms is the "largest private-sector employer in P.E.I." About 80 P.E.I. farmers grow potatoes for Cavendish Farms.

== Background ==
In 1980, Irving Group purchased C.M. Mclean potato and vegetable processing facility in PEI Canada and renamed it Cavendish Farms. In 2001, Cavendish Farms acquired its "first US processing plant in Jamestown, North Dakota". Cavendish Farms is part of the family-owned Irving Group of Companies established in 1882.

Cavendish Farms is the 4th largest processor of frozen potato products in North America, and the "largest private-sector employer" on P.E.I. Prince Edward Island is known for its potatoes—the potato industry employs—directly or indirectly— about 12% of the province's workforce, and contributes over $1 billion annually to the P.E.I. which represents 10.8% of the province's GDP. In 2013, about 88,000 acres of potatoes were grown in P.E.I. Of the three types of potatoes harvested table potatoes, seed potatoes, and processing potatoes, about 60% of P.E.I. are "manufactured into French fries, potato chips, and many other products."

By 2020, about 80 P.E.I. farmers grew potatoes for Cavendish Farms.

== Potato industry in Prince Edward Island ==
P.E.I.'s potato industry is the "biggest economic driver in the province". In 2017, P.E.I. had the " largest potato crop in Canada", according to Statistics Canada." "Processing potatoes into french fries and other frozen products represents up to 70 per cent of the industry."

== Ground water (Prince Edward Island) ==
Prince Edward Island implemented a moratorium on deep well irrigation in 2002, to protect its ground water supply. At an October 2015, P.E.I. Environmental Advisory Committee meeting to draft a Water Act, Leo Broderick with the Council of Canadians said that the Island needs to "legislate a ban on deep well irrigation to prevent long-term groundwater depletion".

The Ministry of Environment provides an online—both historical and real-time—of groundwater levels (GWLs) with data from 14 groundwater level observation wells across PEI: Baltic, Bear River, Bloomfield, Caledonia, Georgetown, Knutsford, Lakeside, New Dominion, New Zealand Road, Riverdale, Sleepyhollow, Souris Line Road, Souris River Road, St. Charles, Summerside GST, and York.

The major source of water supplies in Prince Edward Island—both industrial and potable—is groundwater from 260 watersheds that are "relatively small and non-contiguous." In the late 2010s, the agriculture sector's demand for supplemental irrigation, has presented several challenges for "water and resource managers". Because of the uneven topography of the island and its "relatively small and non-contiguous watersheds", "pumping groundwater has ... raised concerns for groundwater sustainability." In their January 2020 article in the journal Water, the authors write that an "inventory of groundwater is necessary for efficient water resource management, especially in relation to growing groundwater demands for agricultural use. It is neither feasible nor economical to install and manage monitoring groundwater wells in a place like Prince Edward Island, which consists of 260 watersheds for efficient water management."

By 2016, yields for P.E.I. process growers were not increasing at pace with other North American regions, according to P.E.I. Potato Board. In 2017, because of "limited availability of potatoes on the Island" the company imported 150 million pounds of potatoes in 2017 from New Brunswick, Manitoba, Alberta and Maine, according to Ron Clow, the General Manager of Cavendish Farms.

CBC News reported on May 14, 2018, that "French-fry giant Cavendish Farms" had "reiterated its desire to see the end of a moratorium on new high-capacity agricultural wells" which Irving said would help P.E.I. potato farmers "stay competitive". At the Greater Charlottetown Area Chamber of Commerce's annual general meeting, the company president, Robert K. Irving—who was the keynote speaker—said that without "supplemental irrigation" is needed when low rainfalls and drought-type conditions would mean below-average yields during potato growing season."

Potatoes are sensitive to soil water deficits compared to other crops such as wheat, and need frequent irrigation, especially while tubers are growing. With climate change, reduced rainfall in many areas is predicted to increase the need for irrigation of potato crops. Potatoes require 8.4 gallons of water needed to produce 100 grams of each crop, which is quite efficient compared to corn.

In July 2018, Cavendish Farms announced that because of a shortage of Island potatoes, they would be closing their fresh packaging facility in O’Leary and laying off 40 workers.

=== Covid-19 pandemic ===
P.E.I. farm owner, Douglas Campbell, who is District Director of the National Farmers Union, expressed concern that "family farms will disappear unless they are forced under the umbrella of the industrial sector, the processors and retailer. Farmers are often under pressure to use farm practices which they know are destructive. In PEI alone thousands of farm families have been pushed off the land."

During the COVID-19 pandemic, with inter-provincial borders already closed, Cavendish Farms said that because of a surplus of potatoes, that the "P.E.I. potato producers under contract to supply" Cavendish Farms with potatoes should "sell to other markets if they can".

Campbell raised concerns that the $4.7 million relief fund announced by the PEI Minister of Agriculture was largely "destined" for the Irving group of companies. When Cavendish Farms became aware that they had access to government pandemic relief funds, they told their potato producers under contract to supply, that they plan on taking "potatoes from the growers and produce marketable french fries".

In a May 2020, CBC interview, the United Potato Growers of Canada (UPG)'s general manager, Kevin MacIsaac, said that "french fry processors are asking their growers to plant anywhere from 15 to 35 per cent fewer" potatoes in 2020, which had resulted in a surplus of "80 million pounds of unsold seed potatoes". A veteran potato farmer from Grahams Road, P.E.I. who had farmed since the 1970s, said that he had "700,000 pounds of unsold seed potatoes in cold storage" that in a normal year would have yielded over "10 million pounds of potatoes in the fall, ready to be processed into french fries."

The province provided "$4.7 million to pay for shipping and storage of processed potatoes in order to have Cavendish Farms... use up existing stocks from Island growers". The P.E.I. Potato Board said that the provincial funds meant that 100 million pounds of P.E.I. potatoes were processed which "protected $13 million in revenues" for the potato producers, roughly 80 Island farmers.

=== Lands Protection Act ===
In 2019, the P.E.I. chapter of the National Farmers Union raised concerns that the spirit of the province's 1980s Lands Protection Act was not being respected as three farm corporations,—Galloway Farms Ltd., Long River Farms Ltd. and Indian River Farms Ltd.—all naming Mary Jean Irving, the daughter of KC Irving, and/or one or both of her two daughters, Rebecca and Elizabeth Irving, as shareholders and directors—submitted 32 applications to the Island Regulatory and Appeals Commission to "purchase parcels of land totalling 2,221 acres in the Summerside area currently owned by Brendel Farms Ltd." The Lands Protection Act "set limits on land ownership of 1,000 acres for individuals, and 3,000 acres for corporations." In response to the concerns, Mary Jean Irving said that she has been on the "Island and growing potatoes for 29 years" and her two daughters are also interested in farming. Irving said that "neither J. D. Irving group of companies, nor its subsidiary Cavendish Farms, were involved with the proposed land purchases".

=== Indian River Farms ===
Indian River Farms, which is also owned Irving group of companies, is managed by Elizabeth Irving, who is a fifth generation family member. Indian River Farms was established in 1992 and has a staff of about 20 to 49. Its main production is Irish potatoes. In the late 2010s, during a period of long stretches of dry weather" on the Island, potato growers in the area around Spring Valley, Prince Edward Island began to construct large holding ponds of water "seeking to improve potato yields". By 2019, Indian River Farms had seven large holding ponds near Spring Valley and were building more. Electric pumps housed in sheds feed ground water into the large ponds, some of which are constructed on "raised berms, above ground level". All are supplied with groundwater from "multiple low-capacity wells nearby" using electric pumps, housed in sheds. In a July 4, 2019 article in The Guardian, concerns were raised by some Islanders about the way in which large holding ponds in "the back country, away from people" were circumventing the spirit of the ban on new high-capacity agricultural wells on P.E.I. A concerned group of Islanders toured an irrigation pond in Spring Valley. Elizabeth Irving, who is a fifth generation family member of the 135-family Irving group and the manager of Indian River Farms said that a study undertaken by a hydrologist contracted by Indian River Farm, suggested that farming only uses "less than one percent of the annual recharge from surface runoff and precipitation".

== Locations ==
The company's head office is Dieppe, New Brunswick with sales offices in Toronto, Montreal, and Boston. Cavendish Farms has potato processing plants in New Annan, Prince Edward Island, Lethbridge, Alberta, and Jamestown, North Dakota, and an appetizer plant in Wheatley, Ontario.

=== New Annan, Prince Edward Island ===
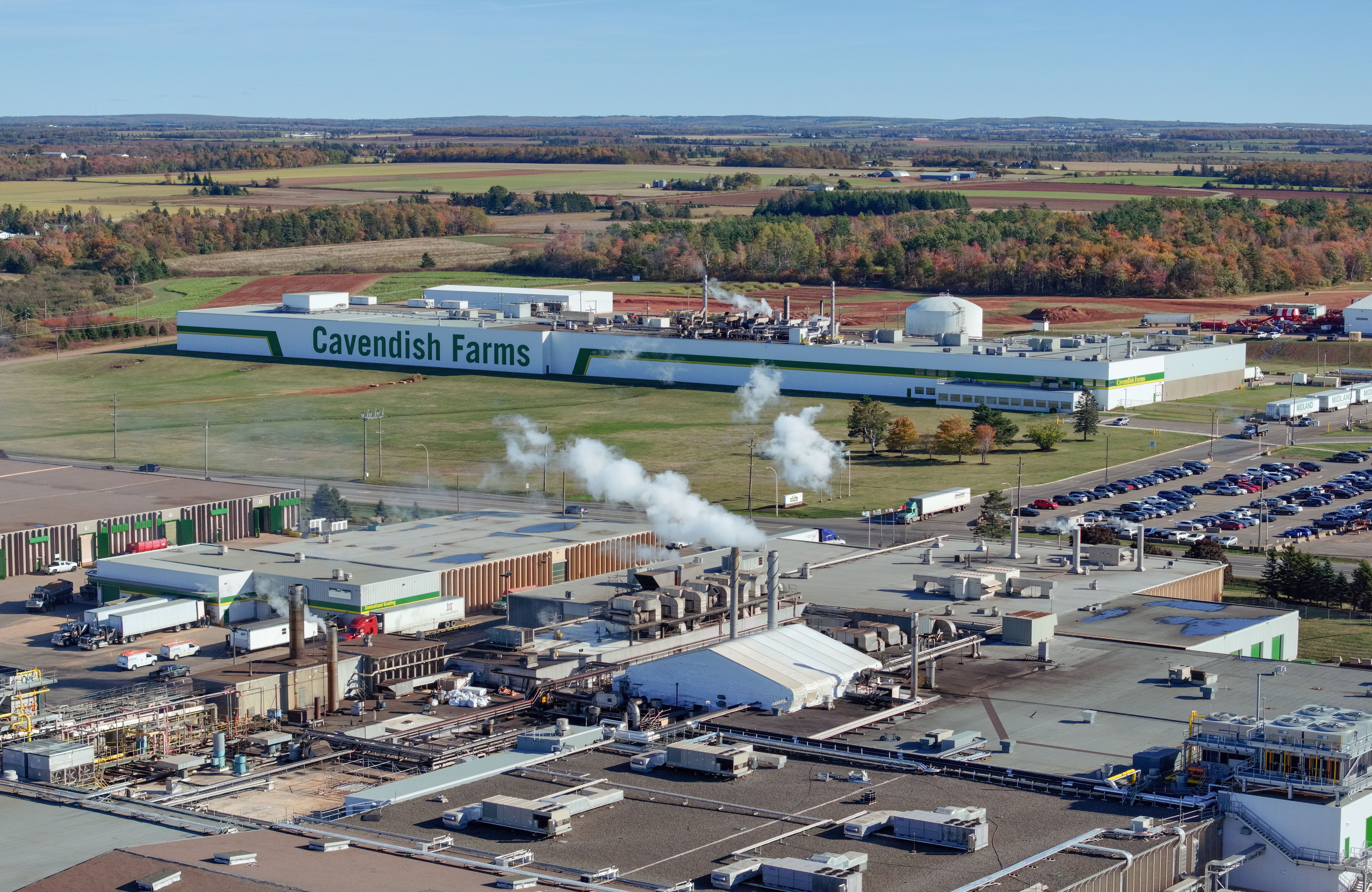
A potato-processing factory in Kensington, Prince Edward Island

By 2020, the New Annan facility, which employs 700, was "one of the largest employers in the Prince Edward Island" In 2017 the company constructed a "50 million pound refrigerated storage facility."

=== Jamestown, North Dakota ===
Cavendish Farms acquired facilities in Jamestown, North Dakota in 2001—its first processing plant.

=== Lethbridge ===
The company acquired a processing plant in Lethbridge, Alberta in 2013 and in 2017, opened a new frozen potato processing plant there.

== Partnerships ==
Cavendish Farms partnered with Holland College's Culinary Institute of Canada to establish the Cavendish Culinary Creation Center.

Yields for P.E.I. process growers were not increasing at pace with other North American regions, according to P.E.I. Potato Board. In May 2016, Cavendish Farms, its process growers, the government of PEI's Potato Board and the Department of Agriculture began a three-year Enhanced Agronomy Initiative, which is led by the Potato Board's Ryan Barrett. to "increase yields and profits." All four partners are jointly funding the Initiative, which will cost $180,000 a year for the three years. The growers funding is paid through a "special check-off on their processing contracts". The Initiative's steering committee also includes Agriculture and Agri-Food Canada and the Dalhousie Faculty of Agriculture representatives.

== See also ==
- J.D. Irving Limited
- K.C. Irving
- Irving Group of Companies
