= 1871 census of Prince Edward Island =

Last PEI census before joining Canada

1871 Census of Prince Edward Island
← 1861	April 1871	1881 →

General information
- Country: Prince Edward Island

Results
- Total population: 94,021 (▲16.2%)

The Census of Prince Edward Island (1871) was a detailed enumeration in the colony of Prince Edward Island, and the last to take place prior to joining Canada in 1873. The census took place in April 1871, and published on August 23, 1871. The total population count of Prince Edward Island in 1871 was 94,021. This was a 16.3% increase over the 1861 census of 80,857.

The previous census of Prince Edward Island was in 1861. The next census took place in 1881, after Prince Edward Island joined Canada as its seventh province.

== Census summary ==
A summary of information about Prince Edward Island.

Total population	94,021
Families	14,841
Men	47,121
Women	46,900

The 1871 census identified 79,948 non-Mi’kmaq people born on the island, 9,797 individuals born in the United Kingdom, 3,246 persons born elsewhere in the British Empire, 384 foreign-born persons, and 323 people of Mi'kmaq ethnicity. The remaining 323 Islanders did not provide a response.

The 1871 census also identified 322 people as "infirm":

- 64 people as blind
- 70 people as deaf and unable to speak ("deaf and dumb")
- 188 people as insane

== Population by county ==
County	1871 census	1861 census	1855 census	1848 census	% change 1861–1871	% change 1848–1871
Prince County	28,302	21,401	17,552	15,017	32.2	88.5
King's County	23,068	19,931	17,342	15,475	15.7	49.1
Queen's County	42,651	39,525	36,602	32,107	7.9	32.8
Prince Edward Island total	94,021	80,857	71,496	62,599	16.3	50.2

Two communities were individually enumerated in this census: Charlottetown (population 8,807), and Georgetown (population 1,056). For census purposes, the remainder of the colony was divided into thirteen districts, five in Prince County, and four each in Kings County and Queens County.

== See also ==
- History of Prince Edward Island
- Canadian Confederation
- Ethnic groups in Canada
- History of immigration to Canada
