= New Annan, Prince Edward Island =

New Annan
- rural unincorporated community
- Location within Prince Edward Island
- Coordinates: 46°25′10″N 63°42′42″W
- Country: Canada
- Province: Prince Edward Island
- County: Prince County
- Founded: 1800s
- Time zone: UTC-4 (Atlantic (AST))
  - Summer (DST): UTC-3 (ADT)
- Canadian Postal code: C1N
- NTS Map: 011L05
- GNBC Code: BABWL

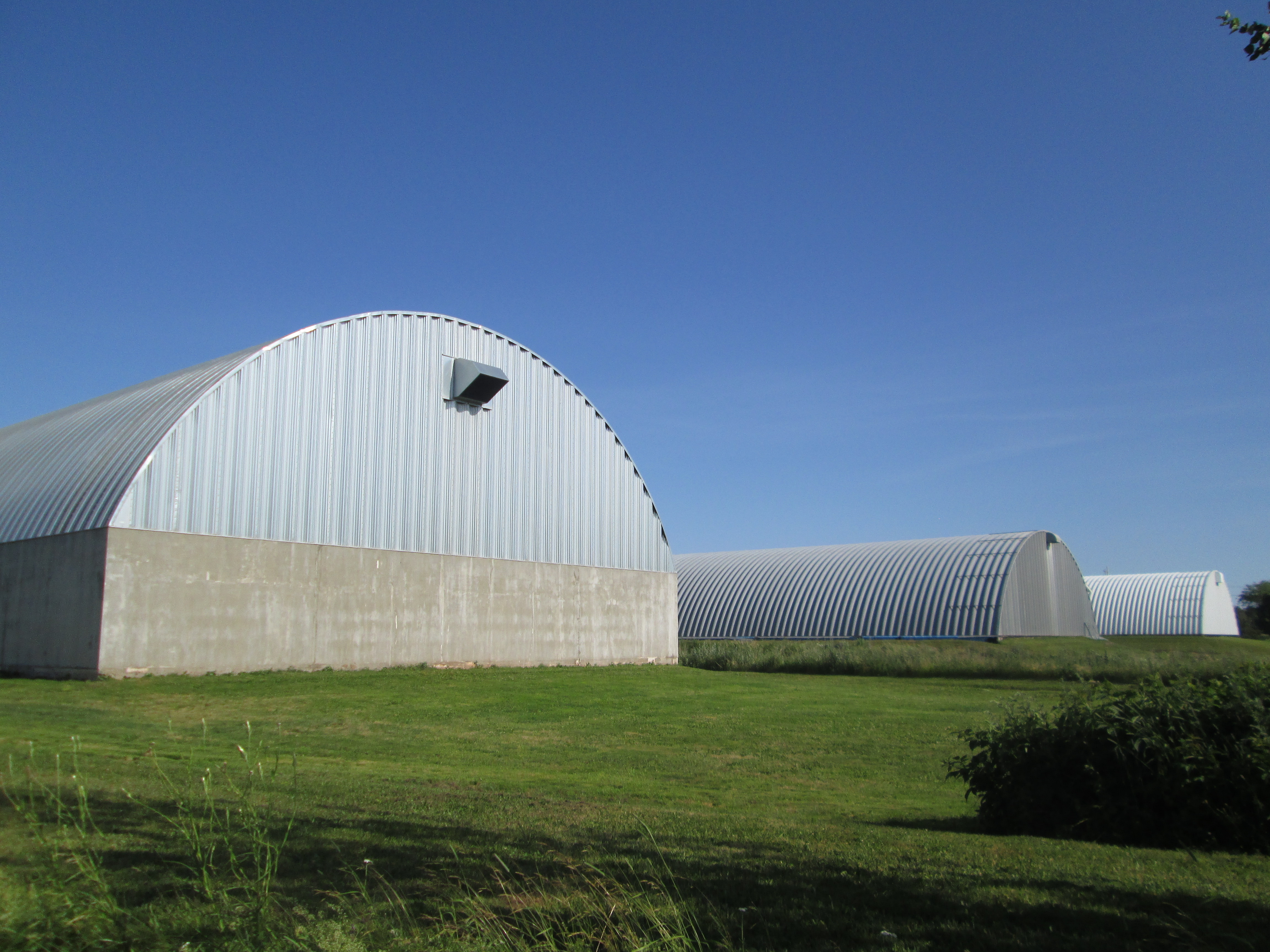

New Annan is a Canadian rural community located in Prince County, Prince Edward Island. It is named after Annan, Dumfries-shire, Scotland.

Cavendish Farms, Prince Edward Island's largest private sector employer, maintains two large frozen foods processing plants in New Annan.

An 1875 gazetteer refers to New Annan Mills as a "small village in Prince co. [County], 6 miles from Summerside. Pop.[Population] 80."

== November 2011 murder-suicide ==
On November 13, 2011, two people died in suspicious circumstances in New Annan. A car parked at the roadside with a man and a woman in it was found on Highway 2 in New Annan, between highways 110 and 120. The woman was dead due to stabbing and the man later died in hospital due to a self-inflicted stab wound.
