= Prince Royalty, Prince Edward Island =

Coordinates: 46°33′N 63°41′W

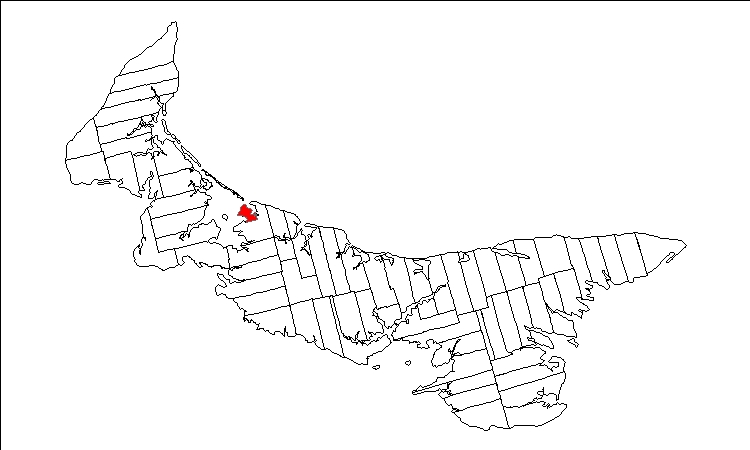

Prince Royalty (Prince's Town) is the royalty for Prince County, Prince Edward Island, Canada.

The township was supposed to host the county's shire town, named Princetown, and was surveyed for this purpose during the 1764 colonial survey undertaken by Capt. Samuel J. Holland.

The township is located on a peninsula extending into Malpeque Bay from adjacent Lot 18. Unfortunately, the shallow harbour made it unsuitable for a major port and the commercial centre of the county shifted to an area of Lot 17 township which fronted a sheltered harbour on the Northumberland Strait, which was later named Summerside.

Prince Royalty is part of St. David's Parish.

== History ==
With Prince Royalty being largely unused as a shire town, it saw limited rural settlement by farmers since the Crown, and not a landlord owned the territory, thus an active settlement scheme never transpired. A military road was constructed from the colonial capital at Charlottetown early on and was named the Princetown Road.

Princetown became a village on December 2, 1901, but downgraded its status to a settlement in 1925. The post office changed the community name from Princetown to Malpeque on November 16, 1945; the community of Princetown changed its name to Malpeque on March 13, 1947.

Malpeque's status was further downgraded to a hamlet in 1960 and was amalgamated into the larger community of Malpeque Bay in 1973, with Malpeque's status being a locality.

== See also ==
- Royal eponyms in Canada
