= Lady Slipper Drive =

Former scenic drive in Prince Edward Island, Canada

Coordinates: 46.390131°N 63.785051°W

The Lady Slipper Drive is a former scenic drive located in Prince County, Prince Edward Island, beginning and ending at Summerside.

The Lady Slipper Drive comprised numerous routes along coastal sections of Prince County and measured approximately 300 km in length. It was replaced in 2005 by the North Cape Coastal Drive.

Deriving its name from the Lady's Slipper orchid, the provincial floral emblem which grows in shaded forests, the signs marking the Lady Slipper Drive depicted a red orchid within a red frame on a square white background.

The Lady Slipper Drive was developed as a tourism marketing project during the 1970s in conjunction with the Blue Heron Drive in Queens County and the Kings Byway in Kings County.
