= Richmond Parish, Prince Edward Island =

Coordinates: 46°25′48.8″N 64°2′50.5″W

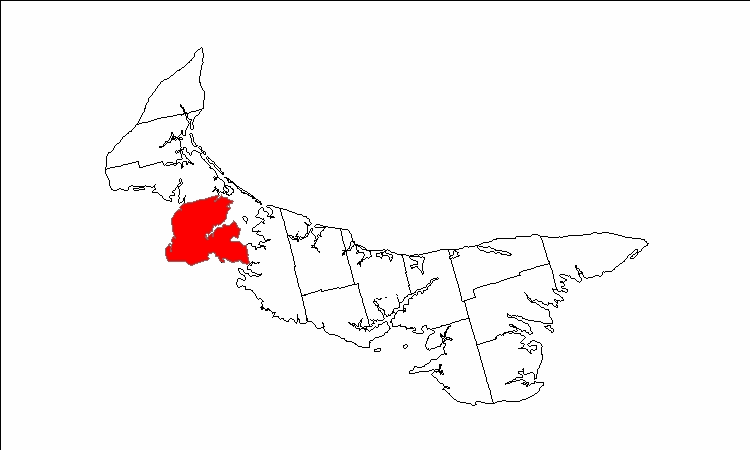

Richmond Parish (French: Paroisse Richmond) was created as a civil parish in Prince County, Prince Edward Island, Canada, during the Samuel Holland's 1764-1766 survey.

It contains the following townships:

- Lot 13
- Lot 14
- Lot 15
- Lot 16
- Lot 17
