= Joseph-Félix Arsenault =

Canadian politician

Member of Legislative Assembly of Prince Edward Island

Personal details
- Born: October 16, 1865 Abram Village
- Died: February 27, 1947 (aged 81)

Joseph-Félix "Joe-Félix" Arsenault (October 16, 1865 – February 27, 1947) was a merchant and political figure in Prince Edward Island, Canada. He represented 3rd Prince in the Legislative Assembly of Prince Edward Island from 1897 to 1904 as a Conservative member.

He was born in Abrams Village, the son of Joseph-Octave Arsenault and Gertrude Gaudet. He was educated there and at the College of Saint Joseph in Memramcook, New Brunswick. He married Gertrude Cormier. Arsenault operated a general store.

He was defeated by Joseph Félix H. Arsenault when he ran for reelection in 1904. In 1905, he left for Coleraine, Minnesota, where he worked for a mining company until 1913. He returned to Summerside and then moved to Charlottetown in 1917 to work for the Department of Internal Revenue. He operated a general store in Abrams Village from 1922 to 1925, then moved to Summerside, where he managed a general store. Arsenault died in Summerside at the age of 81.

His brother Aubin-Edmond Arsenault became premier for the province.
