= Water (journal) =

- Discipline: Hydrology
- Language: English

Publication details
- Publisher: MDPI
- Impact factor: 3.530 (2021)

Standard abbreviations
- ISO 4: Water
- NLM: Water (Basel)

Indexing
- ISSN: 2073-4441

Links
- Journal homepage; Online archive

Water is a scientific journal that covers water science and technology research. Topics of interest include water resources management, water quality & water scarcity etc. The journal is published by MDPI.

== Abstracting and indexing ==
The journal is abstracted and indexed for example in:

- AAGRIS
- CABI
- DOAJ
- Elsevier Databases (Scopus etc.)
- Web of Science

According to the Journal Citation Reports, the journal has a 2025 impact factor of 3.50.
