= Prince County, Prince Edward Island =

County in Prince Edward Island, Canada

Coordinates: 46°45′N 64°5′W

Prince County Comté de Prince (French)
- County
- Location of Prince County in Prince Edward Island
- Incorporated Towns & Municipalities: Summerside (city) Alberton (town); Borden-Carleton (town) Kensington (town) O'Leary (town); Tignish (town)
- Parishes: North Parish; Egmont Parish; Halifax Parish; Richmond Parish; St. David's Parish
- Townships and royalties: List: Prince Royalty, Lot 1, Lot 2, Lot 3, Lot 4, Lot 5, Lot 6, Lot 7, Lot 8, Lot 9, Lot 10, Lot 11, Lot 12, Lot 13, Lot 14, Lot 15, Lot 16, Lot 17, Lot 18, Lot 19, Lot 25, Lot 26, Lot 27, Lot 28

Area
  - Total: 1,979.21 km^{2} (764.18 sq mi)

Population (2021)
  - Total: 46,234
  - Density: 23.360/km^{2} (60.502/sq mi)
- Median income/capita: $30,609

Prince County is located in western Prince Edward Island, Canada. The county's defining geographic feature is Malpeque Bay, a sub-basin of the Gulf of St. Lawrence, which creates the narrowest portion of Prince Edward Island's landmass, an isthmus upon which the city of Summerside is located.

The geographic division created by Malpeque Bay is informally augmented by a socio-economic division between the more urban East Prince and rural West Prince, although the line of division generally varies. Much of Prince Edward Island's industrial base is concentrated in the eastern part of the county, with three large frozen French fry manufacturing plants, a potato chip manufacturing plant, and an aerospace industry located at a former air force base. Industrial farming for root crops such as potatoes accounts for the majority of rural economic activity, followed by fishing for shellfish such as lobster and crab.

The county was named by Capt. Samuel Holland in 1765 for George, Prince of Wales, who would later become King George IV (1762–1830). As such, Prince County's shire town was designated as Princetown, but the inferior harbour for Prince Royalty saw the settlement pattern change to give this honour to Summerside.

== History ==
The area today known as Prince County was first inhabited by the Mi’kmaq of Epikwik. The French would later colonise the area and between 1728 and 1758 many settled in the area between Malpeque Bay and Bedeque Bay. In 1758 the British captured Prince Edward Island and began to expel most of the Acadians; however British control over Prince County was tenuous and many of the Acadians were able to escape.

When the British were formally given control of Prince Edward Island in 1763 they began to establish feudal land divisions. Prince County was established in 1764 in honour of George, Prince of Wales, by Surveyor-General of North America Samuel Holland who would later in the 1767 Land Lottery be awarded Lot 28 in Prince County. According to the survey the Shire Town of Prince County was Originally intended to be ‘Princetown’ however due the poor status of its harbour the status was instead awarded to Summerside.

During the Second World War Prince County became a hub of military activity, several military bases were established during this time, Canadian Armed Forces Base Summerside, an airport and bombing-gunnery school at Mount Pleasant, an emergency landing strip and hangar at Wellington and a RADAR base in Tignish. Other locations like search and rescue stations at Alberton South and Tignish Run, and target areas at Higgins Wharf and on Hog Island.

== Demographics ==
Historical populations
Year	Pop.	±%
1871	28,302	—
1881	34,347	+21.4%
1891	36,470	+6.2%
1901	35,400	−2.9%
1911	32,779	−7.4%
1921	31,520	−3.8%
1931	31,500	−0.1%
1941	34,490	+9.5%
1991	43,241	+25.4%
1996	44,566	+3.1%
2001	44,495	−0.2%
2006	44,499	+0.0%
2011	44,348	−0.3%
2016	43,730	−1.4%

As a census division in the 2021 Census of Population conducted by Statistics Canada, Prince County had a population of 46,234 living in 19,660 of its 22,776 total private dwellings, a change of 5.3% from its 2016 population of 43,910. With a land area of 2,006.27 km^{2} (774.63 sq mi), it had a population density of 23.0/km^{2} (59.7/sq mi) in 2021.

== Transportation ==
=== Major highways ===
- Route 1 (TCH)
- Route 1A
- Route 2
- Route 6
- Route 8
- Route 10

=== Airports ===
Summerside-Slemon Park Airport

== Places ==
Cities

- Summerside

Towns

- Alberton
- Borden-Carleton
- Kensington
- O'Leary
- Tignish

Municipalities

- Abrams Village
- Bedeque and Area
- Central Prince
- Elmsdale
- Greenmount-Montrose
- Kinkora
- Linkletter
- Lot 11 and Area
- Malpeque Bay
- Miminegash
- Miscouche
- Sherbrooke
- St. Felix
- St. Louis
- Tignish Shore
- Tyne Valley
- Wellington

Unincorporated communities

- Albany
- Augustine Cove
- Belmont
- Port Hill
- Days Corner
- Richmond
- Union Corner

Indian reserves

- Lennox Island 1

== See also ==
- Lady Slipper Drive
- Royal eponyms in Canada
