= St. David's Parish, Prince Edward Island =

Coordinates: 46°19′24.7″N 63°44′22.1″W

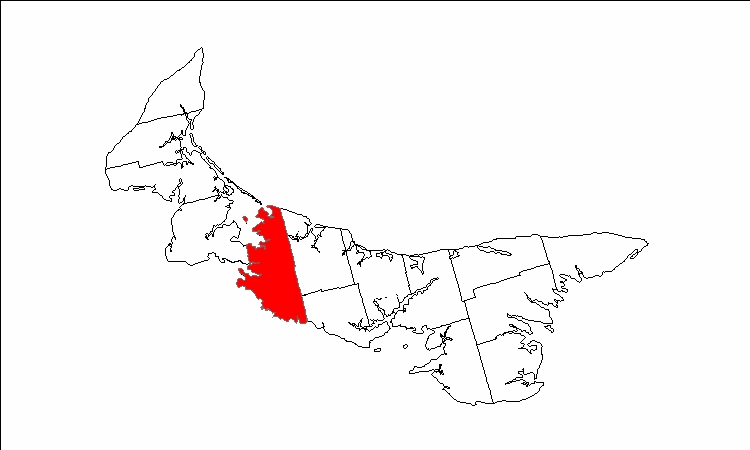

St. David's Parish was created as a civil parish in Prince County, Prince Edward Island, Canada, during the 1764–1766 survey of Samuel Holland.

It contains the following townships:

- Lot 18
- Lot 19
- Lot 25
- Lot 26
- Lot 27
- Lot 28

It also contains Prince Royalty.
