= Joseph-Octave Arsenault =

Canadian politician

The Hon. Joseph-Octave Arsenault
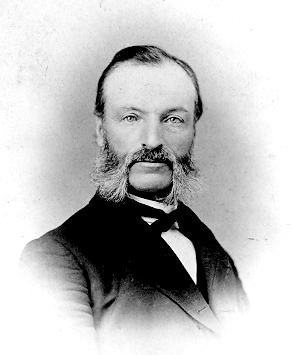

Senator for Prince Edward Island, Prince Edward Island
- In office February 18, 1895 – December 14, 1897
- Appointed by: Mackenzie Bowell

Member of the Legislative Assembly of Prince Edward Island for 3rd Prince
- In office 1873–1895

Personal details
- Born: August 5, 1828 Cascumpec, PEI
- Died: December 14, 1897 (aged 69) Abrams Village, PEI
- Party: Conservative
- Children: Aubin-Edmond Arsenault; Joseph-Félix Arsenault

Joseph-Octave Arsenault (August 5, 1828 – December 14, 1897) was a Canadian politician who was the first Acadian from Prince Edward Island to be named to the Senate of Canada.

Born in Cascumpec, Prince Edward Island, the son of Mélème Arsenault and Bibienne Poirier, he was a teacher, and later the owner of several businesses, including two general stores and a fish company. In 1867, he was elected to the Legislative Assembly of Prince Edward Island for the riding of 3rd Prince and served for 28 years. In 1895, he was appointed to the Senate representing the senatorial division of Prince Edward Island. He served until his death in Abram-Village in 1897.

In 1861, he married Gertrude Gaudet. They had nine children. His son Aubin-Edmond Arsenault was Premier of Prince Edward Island and his son Joseph-Félix Arsenault served in the provincial assembly.

Arsenault played an important role in organizing the first two Acadian national conventions which were held in Memramcook, New Brunswick in 1881 and Miscouche, Prince Edward Island in 1884.
