= Borden-Carleton =

- Town
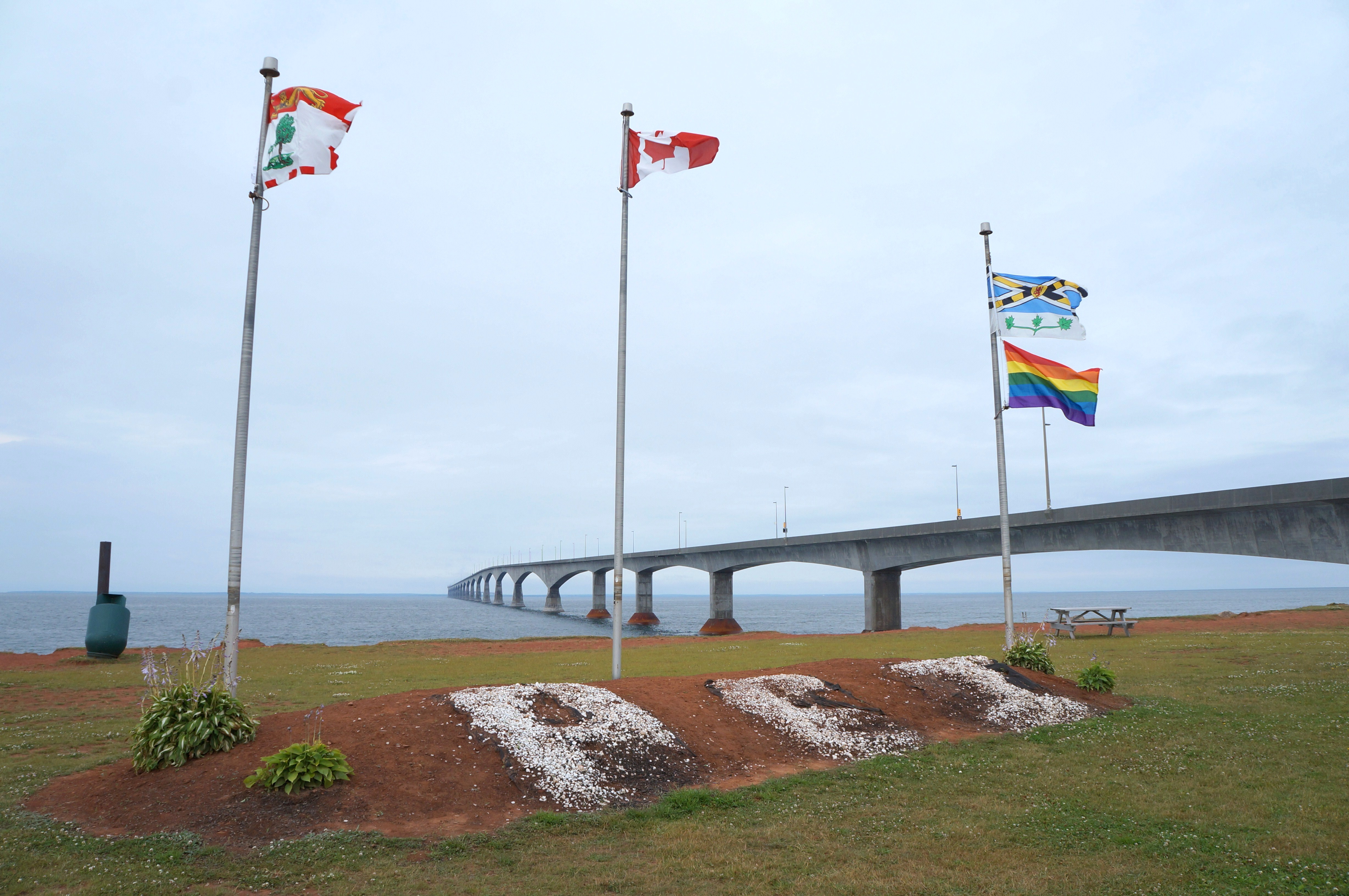

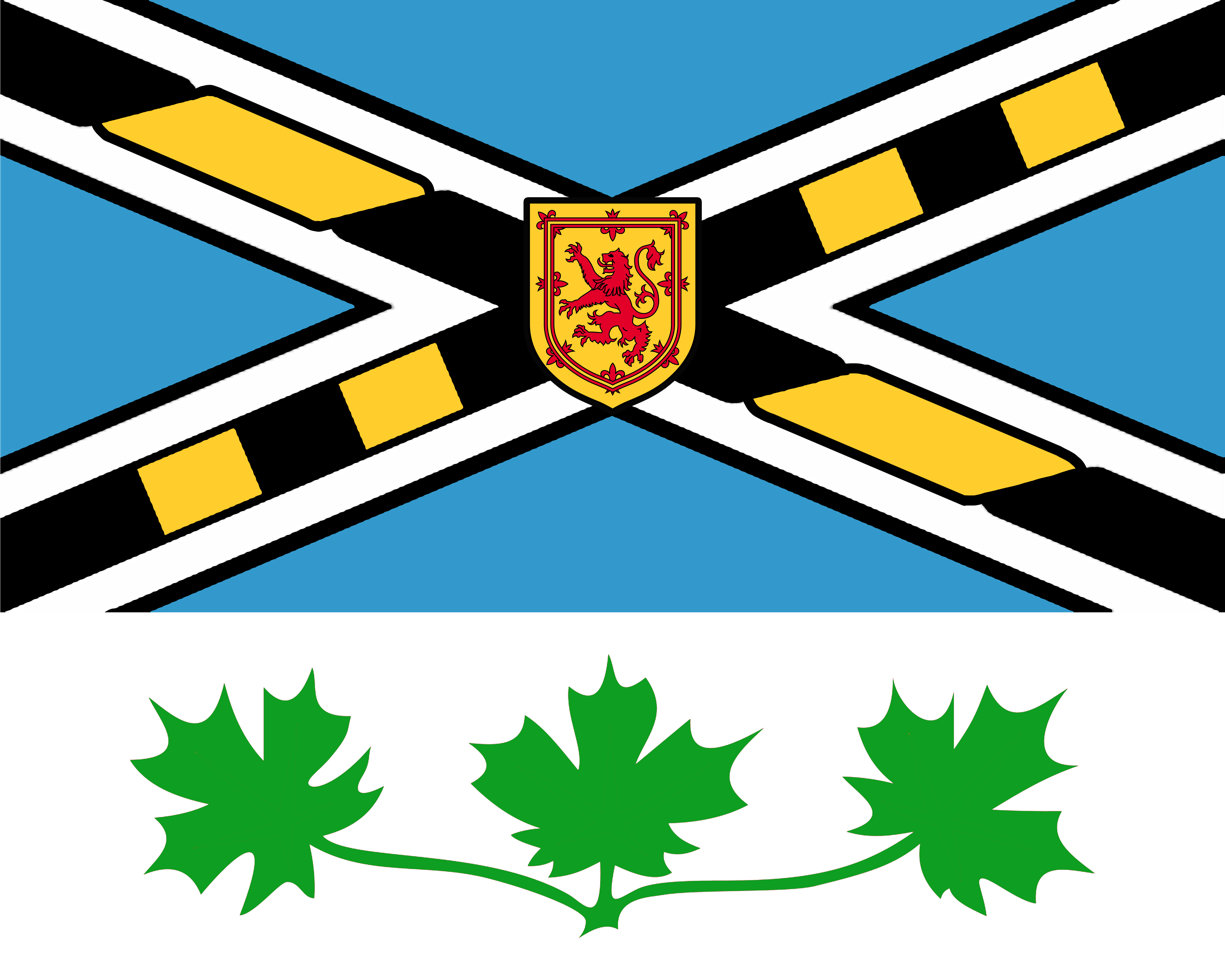
- Flag Coat of arms
- Motto: "We Are The Link"
- Location of Borden-Carleton in Prince Edward Island
- Coordinates: 46°15′N 63°41′W
- Country: Canada
- Province: Prince Edward Island
- County: Prince
- Parish: St. David's
- Township: Lot 28
- Community: April 12, 1995
- Town: July 31, 2012

Government
  - Type: Town council
  - Mayor: Randy Ahearn
  - Deputy Mayor: Larry Allen
  - Councillors: Ashley Steele; Nicole Arsenault; Barb Wood; Vacant; Vacant

Area
  - Land: 12.94 km^{2} (5.00 sq mi)

Population (2021)
  - Total: 788
  - Density: 60.9/km^{2} (158/sq mi)
- Time zone: AST
  - Summer (DST): ADT
- Canadian postal code: C0B 1X0
- Area code: 902
- Telephone Exchange: 437, 729, 855
- NTS Map: 011L05
- GNBC Code: BAALI
- Website: www.borden-carleton.ca

Borden-Carleton is a town in Prince County in the Canadian province of Prince Edward Island. It is situated on the south shore fronting on the Northumberland Strait. The town was originally incorporated as a community on April 12, 1995, through the amalgamation of the town of Borden and the community of Carleton. The town of Borden opted to demote its status to a community in light of a declining tax base with the pending completion of the Confederation Bridge and the closure of the Marine Atlantic ferry service. Borden-Carleton became a town on July 31, 2012.

== History ==
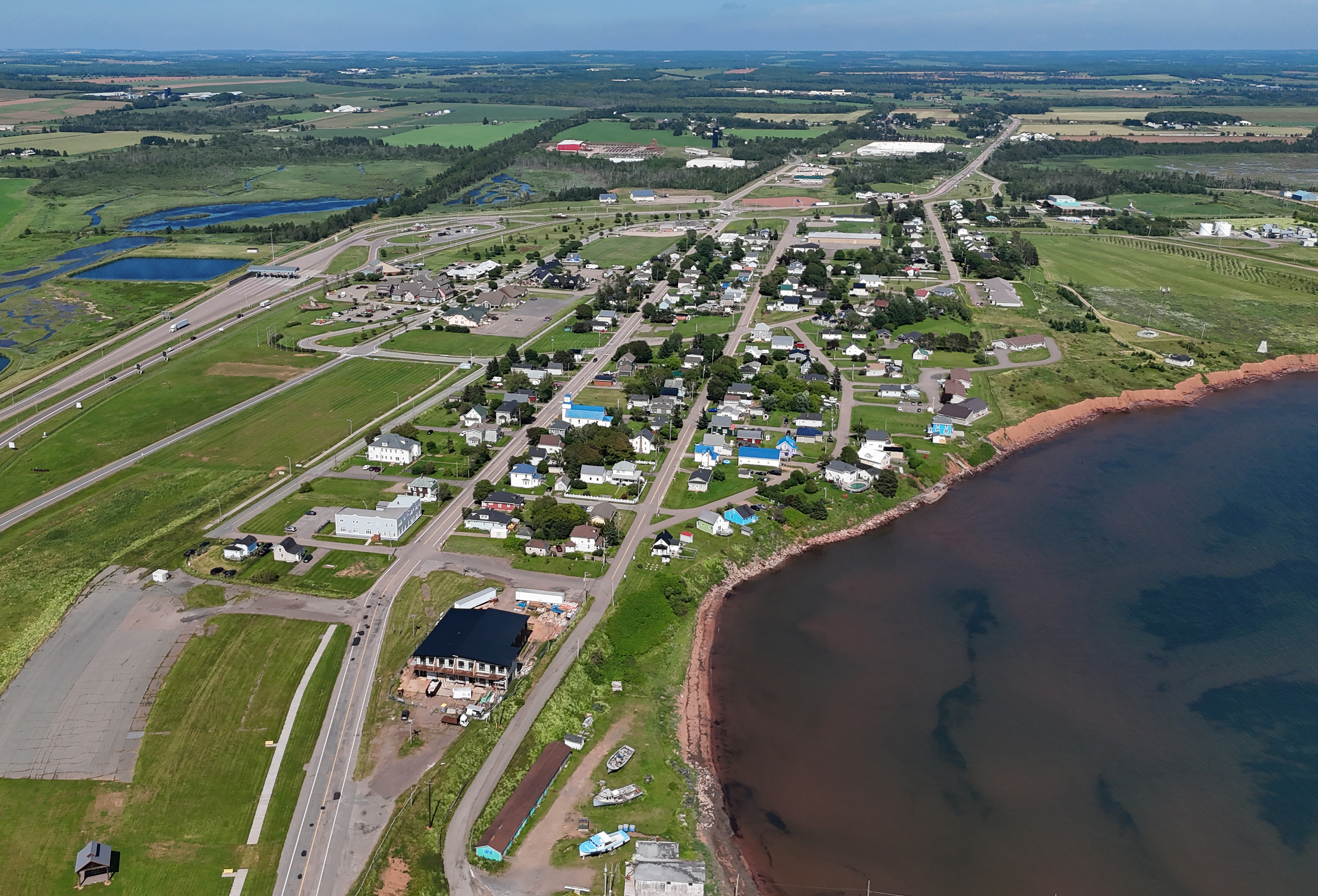
Aerial view of Borden

Borden traces its history to Prince Edward Island's requirements for transportation to mainland North America, whereas Carleton was a surrounding farming community to the north and west of the port.

Borden's development is related to the fall of fortunes for another nearby community during the First World War. A winter iceboat service crossed the Abegweit Passage between nearby Cape Traverse to Cape Tormentine, New Brunswick for many decades during the 19th century and early 20th century. The Prince Edward Island Railway built a line from its mainline near Emerald Junction to the Cape Traverse wharf to facilitate this traffic in the 1880s.

By the 20th century, the federal government began to face the reality of an unreliable winter iceboat service, which existed primarily due to the Dominion having failed to meet its obligation to provide "continuous steamship service" under the Prince Edward Island Terms of Union, when the province entered Confederation in 1873. As a result, the federal government announced in 1912 that it had commissioned the construction of a custom-designed railcar ferry, the SS Prince Edward Island at a shipyard in Newcastle upon Tyne, England.

The new ferry, to be operated by Canadian Government Railways (later merged into the Canadian National Railways system), was to operate from a new year-round port to be built at Carleton Point, several kilometres west of Cape Traverse; the harbour at Cape Traverse having been deemed unsuitable for a deep draught vessel due to siltation and the need for continuous dredging, despite being the most direct point on Prince Edward Island opposite Cape Tormentine.

The SS Prince Edward Island arrived in the Northumberland Strait in 1915 during the early years of the war but the port at Carleton Point had not been constructed, so the vessel operated in year-round service out of Charlottetown and Georgetown from 1915 until the port at Carleton Point was ready.

Meanwhile, the construction of the port and a modification of the Prince Edward Island Railway line between Emerald Junction to Cape Traverse required large amounts of equipment on land and water, as well as labourers. Some prisoners of war from the Central Powers that Canada and the Allies had jailed in the Maritimes were used in the railway construction, while the ferry pier and dock at Carleton Point was built using a large gantry constructed from Douglas Fir to sling armoured stone and pre-cast concrete caissons delivered by barge - some of which was salvaged from an abandoned wharf at nearby Tidnish, Nova Scotia for the Chignecto Marine Transport Railway that was abandoned in the 1890s.

The new port was commissioned in early 1917 when the SS Prince Edward Island began regular service from the new pier, carrying railway freight and passenger cars; she recorded 506 crossings to Cape Tormentine in that first year alone. The winter of 1917 saw a spectacular sight as dozens of houses and buildings that had been constructed in the port of Cape Traverse to the east were moved by horse and sleigh across the winter sea ice along the coast to the new port at Carleton Point. When the extension of the railway line to the new ferry port was completed, the remnant of the line running to Cape Traverse was abandoned.

In 1919, the community was incorporated as the town of Borden, taking its name from Prime Minister Sir Robert Borden, whose government was responsible for the decision to locate the ferry terminal at Carleton Point. The area outside of Borden retained the community name of Carleton.

Borden, or Port Borden, as it was frequently called, grew with the increased use of the ferry system. After the SS Prince Edward Island was modified by CNR in the 1920s to accept automobiles in addition to rail cars (after PEI legalized the use of automobiles), roads connecting to the port were improved.

In 1931, another vessel, the SS Charlottetown, joined the SS Prince Edward Island in handling the increased rail and road traffic using the ferry service. Most workers for CNR's ferry and railway yard in Borden lived in the town. After the loss of the SS Charlottetown in 1941, the now-elderly SS Prince Edward Island remained the only dedicated vessel on the ferry service through the remainder of the Second World War, aside from brief relief service by the SS Scotia or SS Scotia II from the Strait of Canso railcar ferry service.

In 1947, the QSMV Abegweit entered service and carried the ferry system through the 1950s but was quickly overwhelmed by the increase in automobile traffic, in addition to the constant rail traffic. The completion of the Trans-Canada Highway across PEI and the neighbouring Maritime provinces in the early 1960s saw Borden host a new automobile-only ferry, the MV Confederation, which was built in 1962. During the late 1960s, automobile traffic saw record growth. In 1968, CN stopped operating passenger trains on PEI, switching the service over to buses, and the ferry terminals and parking lots at Borden and Cape Tormentine were redesigned by CN to accommodate more cars and trucks; in Borden's case, part of its rail yard was used for this purpose, with the yard being redesigned in light of declining rail traffic and resulting in the town's original passenger station being demolished.

Throughout the 20th century, and going as far back as the latter 19th century before a ferry service was instituted, there had been discussions by various politicians about replacing the ferry service with a permanent crossing. Early proposals envisioned a railway tunnel under the Northumberland Strait but these evolved by the causeway-building craze of the 1950s (coupled with the development of the Trans-Canada Highway) into designs incorporating a causeway and tunnel beneath a navigation channel to carry rail and road traffic. Discussions and proposals were timed around federal elections and work on the land-based approach roads in New Brunswick and PEI for one proposal was actually undertaken in 1965 before all talk of a permanent crossing was shelved in light of scientific recommendations against a causeway (for navigation and environmental reasons). The federal government instead opted to expand the capacity of the existing ferry system.

The late 1960s saw a temporary relief vessel, the MV Lucy Maude Montgomery, enter service for several years, along with a much larger and more powerful icebreaking railcar ferry, the MV John Hamilton Gray, which entered service in 1968, retiring the SS Prince Edward Island after a record 51 years of service. New docks were constructed and more permanent vessels for the ferry service were ordered. In 1971 the sister ships MV Holiday Island and MV Vacationland entered service, and Borden processed record traffic on its ferry system in the lead-up to PEI's centennial year in 1973, after which the MV Confederation and MV Lucy Maude Montgomery were reassigned to other services and left Borden permanently.

In 1977, CN reorganized its ferry services in eastern Canada under a separate operating company named CN Marine; the new company immediately ordered a newly designed ferry to replace the MV Abegweit, which reached 30 years service that year. The new vessel, originally named MV Straitway but renamed MV Abegweit (after the original Abegweit was renamed MV Abby prior to being retired), entered service in 1982 and was the largest capacity ferry vessel to operate from Borden.

In 1986, CN Marine was renamed Marine Atlantic, to remove all traces of its link to the railway company. At the same time, discussion of a permanent crossing (a "Fixed Link" to the mainland) was revived by the federal government after it received several unsolicited proposals. CN abandoned all of its railway lines in PEI effective December 31, 1989, with the MV John Hamilton Gray hauling the last locomotives and cars off the Island on December 28. With the closure of the railway and the abandonment of the yard, the western side of Borden became an industrial brownfield during the early 1990s.

In 1992, it was announced that the Northumberland Strait Crossing Project, or the "Fixed Link", would be built and a Calgary company, Strait Crossing Incorporated (SCI), had been selected as the developer. SCI secured the use of the old Borden Elementary School (which had been replaced several years earlier by the Amherst Cove Consolidated School on the northern edge of town) and undertook drill core sampling for bridge pier locations through 1993. In 1994, a farm property on Amherst Head, immediately east of Borden, was purchased and a staging facility was constructed for building massive bridge components on shore. A large pier was built into the harbour to accommodate a heavy lift marine crane which would carry the components into the Northumberland Strait to be installed. Throughout the 1994–1996 period, Borden's local economy grew at an unprecedented rate with the influx of over 5,000 workers in the town of 800.

The longest-serving mayor of Borden was Gilbert Bell, who served from 1959 to 1986.

=== Confederation Bridge Project ===
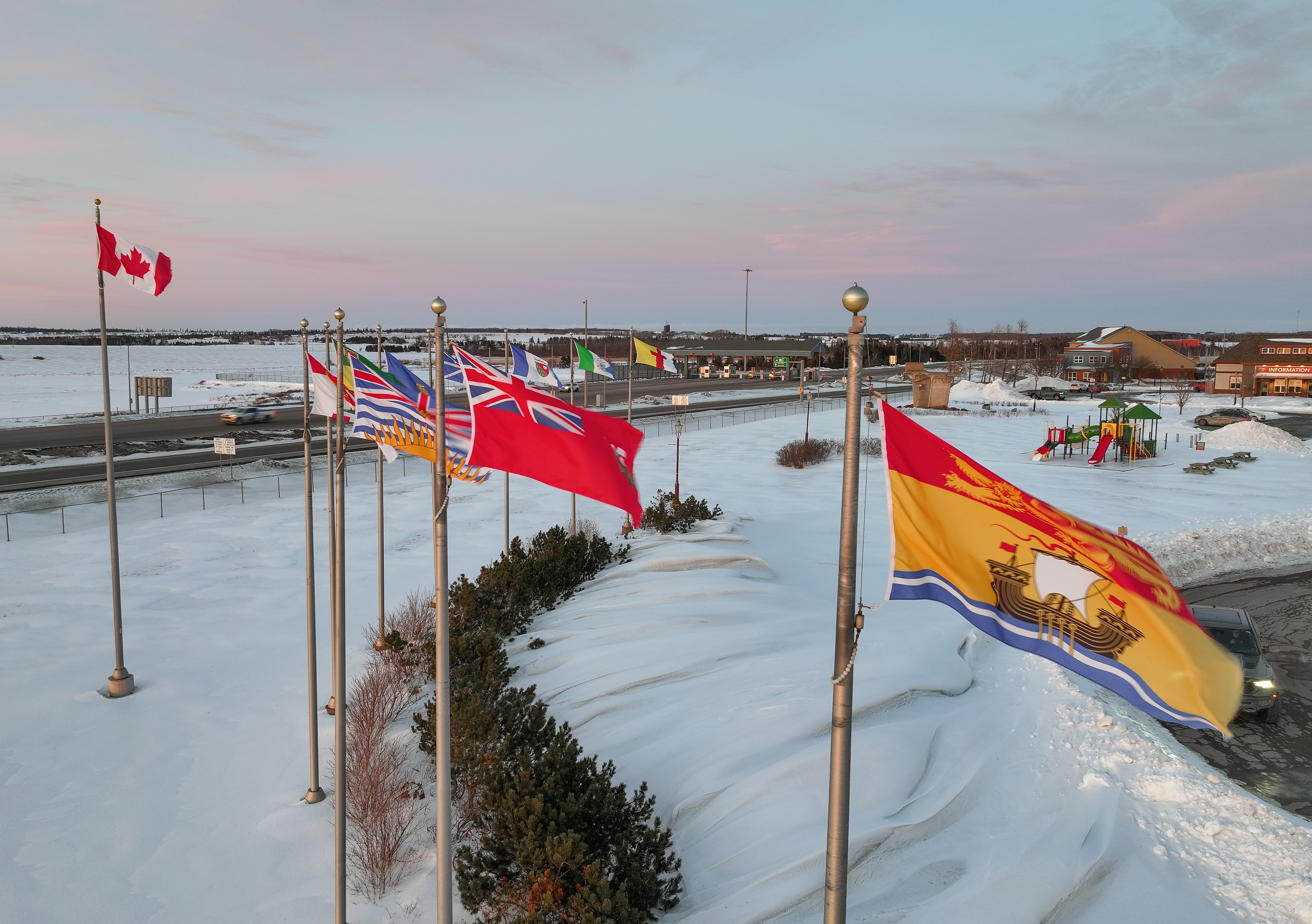
Canadian provincial and territory flags at Gateway Village

The project was named Confederation Bridge and upon its opening on May 31, 1997, the ferry service closed after 70 years of daily operation; the vessels were transferred to other services or sold off and the ferry wharves, terminals and other shore-based facilities were decommissioned and dismantled.

After the completion of the Confederation Bridge, Borden's economy shrank as the influx of workers left the town and province and as some of the laid-off or retired ferry workers moved away. The federal government provided "Fixed Link Adjustment Funds" which saw the development of a tourist shopping complex on the property of the former railway yard, which is now named "Gateway Village".

The adjustment funding also paid for the expansion of the town's industrial park to accommodate new manufacturing interests and today the majority of Borden residents are employed in local manufacturing or service industries or in the tourism sector. Major employers include Master Packaging (a subsidiary of J.D. Irving Limited), Silliker Glass (a glass supplier and Kawneer Aluminum fabricator), Confederation Cove Mussels, MacDougall Steel Erectors Inc, and Transcontinental Printing (division of Transcontinental Media).

There is an ongoing government effort to find a new use for the Amherst Head staging facility now abandoned by SCI since the completion of the Confederation Bridge construction project.

=== Borden-Carleton Fire Department ===
The Borden-Carleton Fire Department was established in 1929, formally being named the Borden Fire Department. The Fire Department serves the local areas of Borden-Carleton, Cape Traverse, Augustine Cove, North Carleton, Searletown, Albany Corner, and Tryon. The Fire Department operates off of an annual budget from Town Council which usually serves at about $50,000 per year. They also partake in different fundraisers throughout the year to help them buy new equipment.

They have a Fire Station on Borden Avenue, and operate out of a 4 bay station. It was renovated in 2015 to take over the former police departments spot in the same building. They have 4 trucks including a, 2005 Ford F-650 Rescue Van, 2004 GMC Pumper Truck, 2002 Tanker Truck (formerly a milk truck), and a 2014 Metalfab Pumper Truck. They operate under the command of Fire Chief Shawn Jessome, and Deputy Chief Larry Allen. The Fire Department has 22 active Firefighter's as well as 1 active Junior Firefighter. They are composed of 1 Fire Chief, 1 Deputy Chief, 3 Captains, and 17 Firefighters.

=== Borden-Carleton Police Department ===
The Town of Borden-Carleton had its own municipal police force for many years, before it was shut down by council in 2012. The department used to have a number of vehicles over the years, including a Jeep, and several Chevy Impalas over the years, and near the end of the forces time had a marked and unmarked Chevy impala. The force was run for many years by Police Chief Jamie Fox, and in the end they shared a police chief with the town of Kensington.

The Department cost the town over $230 000 dollars per year, which the council found was too much so they opted to go with a single RCMP Officer which only would cost $100,000.

== Areas ==
- Searletown
- North Carleton

== Demographics ==
Federal census population history of Borden-Carleton
Year	Pop.	±%
1991	1,056	—
1996	829	−21.5%
2001	798	−3.7%
2006	786	−1.5%
2011	750	−4.6%
2016	724	−3.5%
2021	788	+8.8%
Source: Statistics Canada

Federal census population history of Borden (pre-incorporation of Borden-Carleton)
Year	Pop.	±%
1921	199	—
1931	385	+93.5%
1941	512	+33.0%
1951	690	+34.8%
1956	712	+3.2%
1961	696	−2.2%
1966	714	+2.6%
1971	624	−12.6%
1976	589	−5.6%
1981	485	−17.7%
1986	514	+6.0%
1991	436	−15.2%
Source: Statistics Canada

In the 2021 Census of Population conducted by Statistics Canada, Borden-Carleton had a population of 788 living in 324 of its 365 total private dwellings, a change of 8.8% from its 2016 population of 724. With a land area of 12.94 km^{2} (5.00 sq mi), it had a population density of 60.9/km^{2} (157.7/sq mi) in 2021.
