= Urbainville, Prince Edward Island =

Community in Prince Edward Island, Canada

Coordinates: 46.463°N 64.038°W

Urbainville is a community in the Canadian province of Prince Edward Island, located in Lot 16 of Prince County, northwest of Summerside.
