= 1881 Canadian census =

Second regularly scheduled Canadian census

← 1871	April 4, 1881	1891 →

General information
- Country: Canada

Results
- Total population: 4,324,810 (▲ ~20%)

The Census of Canada 1880–81 marked the second regularly scheduled collection of national statistics of the Canadian population. The census took place on April 4, 1881, having been assented to via the Census Act on May 15, 1879. The total population count of Canada was 4,324,810. Dependent on the quoted figure, this is either a 24.1% increase from the 1871 census's 3,485,761, or a 17.2% increase from the 1871 estimate's 3,689,257.

The previous census was the 1871 census and the following census was the 1891 census.

== Canada by the numbers ==
A summary of information about Canada.

Total population	4,324,810
Total dwellings	753,017
Families	812,130
Men	2,188,854
Women	2,135,956

== Population by province ==
Province	1881 census	1871 census (Note: Inclusive of the estimates for Manitoba, British Columbia, and the North-West Territories.)	% change
Ontario	1,923,228	1,620,851	18.7
Quebec	1,359,027	1,191,516	14.1
Nova Scotia	440,572	387,800	13.6
New Brunswick	321,233	285,594	12.5
Prince Edward Island	108,891	N/A (Note: 94,021 in the 1871 census of Prince Edward Island.)	N/A (Note: 15.8% increase compared to the 1871 census of Prince Edward Island.)
Manitoba	65,954	25,228	161.4
British Columbia	49,459	36,247	36.4
Territories	56,446	48,000	17.6
Total	4,324,810	3,689,257 (Note: Excluding the estimates, the 1871 census figure is at 3,485,761.)	17.2

== See also ==
- Population and housing censuses by country
