= 1891 Canadian census =

Detailed enumeration of Canadian residents in 1891

← 1881	April 5, 1891	1901 →

General information
- Country: Canada

Results
- Total population: 4,833,239 (▲11.8%)

The Census of Canada 1890–91 was a detailed enumeration of the Canadian population. The census took place on April 5, 1891. The total population count of Canada was 4,833,239, an increase of 11.8% over the 1881 census of 4,324,810.

The previous census was the 1881 census and the following census was the 1901 census.

== Census summary ==
Information was collected on the following subjects, with nine "schedules" or census data collection forms associated with each subject:

1. Living persons
2. Deaths and public institutions
3. Real estate, orchard products, nurseries, vineyards and market gardens
4. Farm products
5. Live stock, animal products, home-made fabrics, furs, and farm labour
6. Industrial establishments
7. Forest products
8. Shipping and mining
9. Fisheries

== Canada by the numbers ==
A summary of information about Canada.

Total population	4,833,239
Total dwellings	877,586
Families	921,643
Men	2,460,471
Women	2,372,768

== Population by province ==
Province	1891 census	1881 census	% change
Ontario	2,114,321	1,923,228	9.9
Quebec	1,488,535	1,359,027	9.5
Nova Scotia	450,396	440,572	2.2
New Brunswick	321,263	321,233	0.0
Manitoba	152,506	65,954	131.2
Prince Edward Island	109,078	108,891	0.1
British Columbia	98,173	49,459	98.5
Territories	98,967	56,446	75.3
Total	4,833,239	4,324,810	11.8

== See also ==
- Population and housing censuses by country
