= List of Prince Edward Island provincial highways =

Prince Edward Island provincial highway system
- Standard highway markers for Prince Edward Island

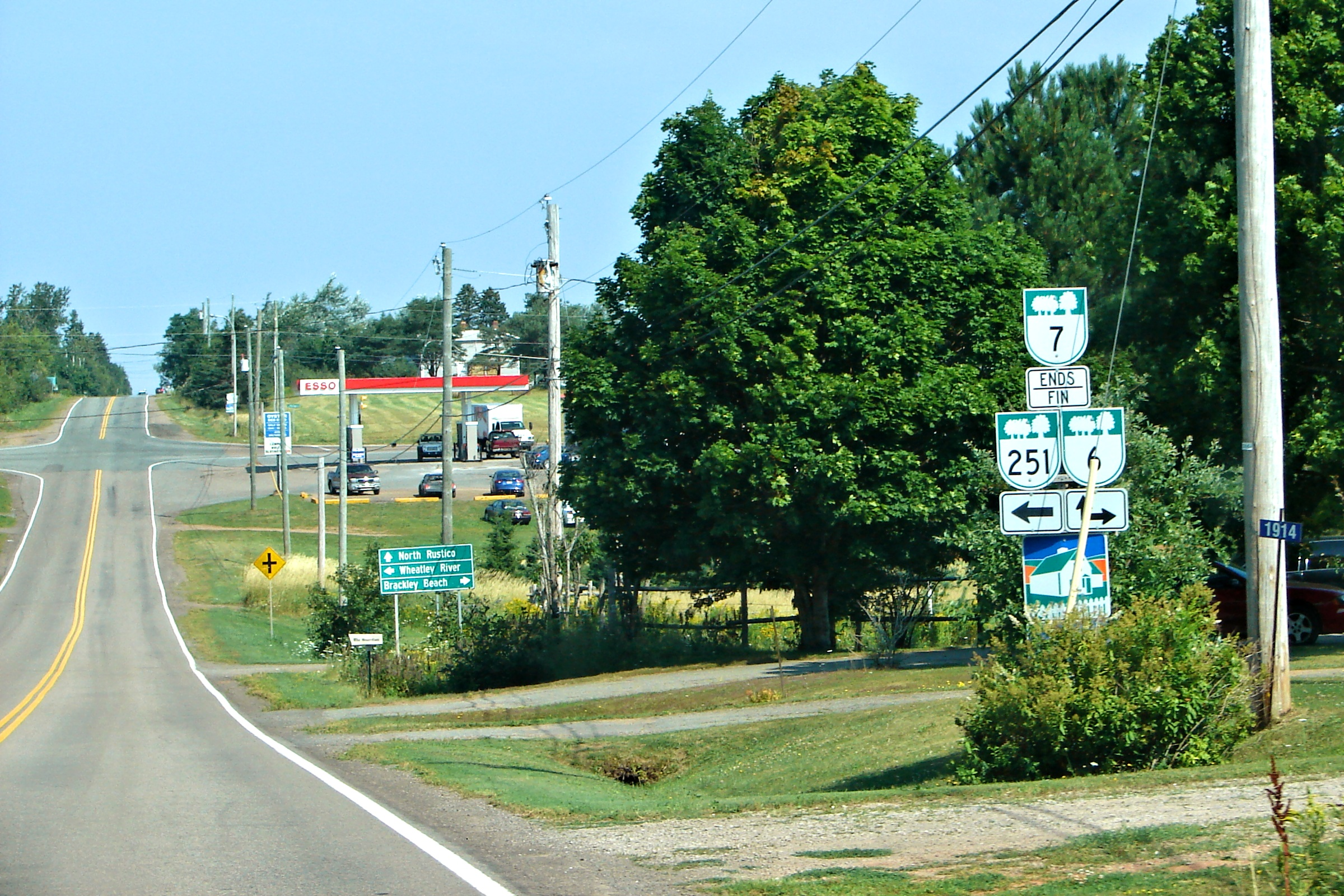
- Intersection of Routes 6, 7, and 251 at Oyster Bed Bridge

Highway names
- Provincial Highways: Prince Edward Island Highway XX (Hwy XX)

System links
- Provincial highways in Prince Edward Island

This is a list of numbered highways in the province of Prince Edward Island.

== Arterial highways ==
Prince Edward Island relies mostly on arterial roads for major inter-city routes. The only expressway in the entire province is the Cornwall Bypass which is entirely part of Route 1 (there are no full-fledged freeways). Another section of highway in the province designated a limited access road is part of the Charlottetown Perimeter Highway, between Upton Road and St. Peters Rd. Maximum speed limit on arterial highways is typically 90 km/h (56 mph).

Route	Length (km)	Length (mi)	Destinations	Notes
Route 1 (TCH)	119.8	74.4	Confederation Bridge at Borden-Carleton - Cornwall - Charlottetown - Stratford - Northumberland Ferries terminal at Wood Islands	Trans-Canada Highway
Route 1A	20.3	12.6	Route 1 at Albany - Central Bedeque - Route 2 at Travellers Rest (northeast of Summerside)	
Route 2	216	134	Tignish - Summerside - Kensington - Hunter River - Charlottetown - Morell - Souris	
Route 3	33	21	Cherry Valley - Pooles Corner - Georgetown	
Route 4	64.9	40.3	Route 1 at Wood Islands - Murray River - Montague - Pooles Corner - Cardigan - Route 2 at Dingwells Mills	Route 4 is designated an arterial highway for approximately 30 km (19 mi) from Route 2 in Dingwells Mills to Route 17 in Montague. The remainder is designated a collector highway.
Route 142	24.1	15.0	Route 2 at Woodstock - O'Leary	Route 142 is designated an arterial highway for approximately 4 km (2.5 mi) from Route 2 to the community of O'Leary. The remainder is designated a local highway.

== Collector highways ==
The province's collector roads are paved all-weather roads, with a maximum speed limit of 80 km/h (50 mph).

Route	Length (km)	Length (mi)	Destinations	Notes
Route 5	27.8	17.3	Cardigan - Elliotvale - Mount Albion	
Route 6	68.7	42.7	Bedford - Grand Tracadie - Brackley Beach - Cavendish - Kensington	
Route 7	9.9	6.2	Milton - Oyster Bed Bridge	
Route 8	21.5	13.4	Ross Corner - Freetown - New London	
Route 9	18.1	11.2	Long Creek - New Haven - Brookfield	
Route 10	23.2	14.4	Bedeque - Cape Traverse - Tryon	
Route 11	65.5	40.7	Mount Pleasant - Abram Village - Summerside	
Route 12	112	70	Miscouche - Tyne Valley - Portage - Alberton - North Cape	
Route 13	38	24	Crapaud - Hunter River - Cavendish	
Route 14	82.2	51.1	Coleman - West Point - Miminegash - Tignish	
Route 15	18.2	11.3	Sherwood (suburb of Charlottetown) - Brackley Beach	
Route 16	75	47	Souris - East Point - Naufrage - St. Peters	
Route 16A	4	2.5	South Lake - Elmira - North Lake	
Route 17	36.9	22.9	Murray River - Gaspereaux - Montague	
Route 17A	6.6	4.1	Cambridge - Sturgeon	
Route 18	23.9	14.9	High Bank - Beach Point - Murray River	
Route 18A	2.9	1.8	White Sands - Murray Harbour	
Route 19			Desable - Rocky Point - Cornwall	
Route 19A			Canoe Cove - New Dominion	
Route 20	32.3	20.1	Kensington - Malpeque - Park Corner - New London	
Route 21	30.9	19.2	Fanning Brook - Mount Herbert - Bunbury	
Route 22	28.6	17.8	Victoria Cross - St. Theresa - Mount Stewart	
Route 23	18.8	11.7	Wood Islands - Iona - Orwell	
Route 24	29.3	18.2	Murray River - Caledonia - Vernon River	
Route 25	18	11	Murray River - Caledonia - Vernon River	
Route 25A	1.8	1.1	Covehead - West Covehead	
Route 26	10.9	6.8	Crossroads (part of Stratford) - Pownal - Mount Albion	Formerly Route 1A
Route 27	7.5	4.7	Clyde River - Cornwall	Formerly Route 1 through the town of Cornwall

== Local routes ==
These are paved and unpaved local roads. The maximum speed limit 80 km/h (50 mph) but typical speed limits are 50–60 km/h (30-40 mph).

=== Prince County ===
Route	Length (km)	Length (mi)	Local names	Communities	Notes	References
Route 101	12.1	7.5	Irishtown Road	Kensington - Burlington - Irishtown - Park Corner		
Route 102	8.4	5.2	Memory Lane, Spring Valley Road	Darnley		
Route 103	7.5	4.7				
Route 104	13.9	8.6	Hamilton Road, Old Princetown Road	Indian River		
Route 105	5.3	3.3	Baseline Road, King Street	Malpeque Bay		
Route 106	6.2	3.9	Clermont Road			
Route 107	13.7	8.5	Blue Shank Road, Nineteen Road	Norboro - Kelvin Grove - Summerside		
Route 108	13.5	8.4	North Freetown Road	North Bedeque - Summerfield		
Route 109	13.8	8.6	Garden Drive, Kelvin Road, Scales Pond Road	Kensington - Mill Valley - Freetown - Kinkora		
Route 110	10.0	6.2	Cairns Road - MacIntyre Road - Mill Road			
Route 111	13.7	8.5	Middleton Road, Newton Road	Middleton - Newton		
Route 112	19.8	12.3	Searletown Road	Albany - Bedeque - Lower Bedeque		
Route 113	10.1	6.3	Drummond Road, Nodd Road	Emerald Junction - South Freetown		
Route 114	7.7	4.8	Maple Plains Road	Maple Plains		
Route 115	12.8	8.0	Mount Tryon Road, North Tryon Crossroad	Tryon - Albany		
Route 116	12.5	7.8	Causeway Road, Nelson Street, Sandy Point Road, Shore Road, Victoria Road	Tryon - Victoria - Hampton - South Melville		
Route 117	3.9	2.4	River Road	Augustine Cove		
Route 118	6.3	3.9	Murray Road, Noonan Shore Road, Dougay Road	Albany		
Route 119	6.9	4.3	Fernwood Road	Bedeque - Fernwood		
Route 120	9.1	5.7	Macmurdo Road, Steel Road, Waterview Road, Wilmot Valley Road	North Bedeque - New Annan		
Route 121	3.6	2.2	Central St	Summerside (Decommissioned)		
Route 122	3.3	2.1	Allen Road	Wellington		
Route 123	9.7	6.0	Belmont Road, Lyle Road	Rosehill		
Route 124	9.0	5.6	Egmont Bay Road, Mill Road, Sunset Drive, Wellington Road	Days Corner - Wellington - Urbainville - Abrams Village		
Route 125	5.6	3.5	Hackmatack Road			
Route 126	5.4	3.4	Saint Gilbert Road	Egmont Bay - Saint Gilbert		
Route 127	13.3	8.3	Macisaac Road	Grand River - Richmond - Saint Hubert - Saint Philip		
Route 128	6.2	3.9	Harmony Line	Harmony - Higgins Road		
Route 129	6.7	4.2	Higgins Road	Higgins Road - Saint Philip		
Route 130	4.4	2.7	Richards Road	Victoria West		
Route 131	11.6	7.2	Sunnyside Road	Cross River - Grand River - Arlington		
Route 132	9.7	6.0	Northam Road	Northam		
Route 133	6.4	4.0	Ellerslie Road	Mount Pleasant - Ellerslie		
Route 134	5.8	3.6	Mcneills Mills Road			
Route 135	9.4	5.8	Hall Road, Taddy Road	Harmony - Saint Gilbert - Saint Hubert		
Route 136	6.8	4.2	Mill Road	Cascumpec - Saint Anthony		
Route 137	3.9	2.4	Trout River Road	Carleton - Roxbury		
Route 138	15.6	9.7	Beaton Road	West Devon - Brae		
Route 139	6.4	4.0	Hamilton Road	Glenwood - Dunblane		
Route 140	14.1	8.8	Boulter Road, Buchanan Road	Coleman - Mount Royal - Glenwood		
Route 141	6.3	3.9	MacDougall Road, Stephen Road	West Point - Hamilton		
Route 142	24.1	15.0	Kelly Road, O'Leary Road	Kelly Road - Unionvale - O'Leary - Knutsford - Springfield West - West Cape		
Route 143	16.2	10.1	Coughlin Road, Howlan Road	Saint Anthony - Howlan - Forestview		
Route 144	10.4	6.5	Haliburton Road	Springfield West - Burton		
Route 145	20.9	13.0	Mill River East Road, Ohalloran Road	Bloomfield - Alberton		
Route 146	15.6	9.7	Duvar Road, Reserve Road, Strang Road	Duvar		
Route 147	9.4	5.8	Locke Road, Navoo Road	Cape Wolfe - Locke Road - Forestview		
Route 148	13.0	8.1	Gaspe Road, Jerry Road, Trainor Road	O'Leary - Duvar - Howlan - Bloomfield - Roseville		
Route 149	6.3	3.9	Piusville Road	Bloomfield		
Route 150	17.5	10.9	Dock Road	Alberton		
Route 151	12.8	8.0	Center Line Road	Saint Lawrence - Alma		
Route 152	25.4	15.8	Main Street, Northport Shore Road, Union Road	Northport - Alberton - Huntley - Profits Corner - Saint Edward		
Route 153	9.4	5.8	Greenmount Road	Tignish - Saint Felix - Greenmount -		
Route 154	4.0	2.5	Pridham Road	Montrose		
Route 155	5.7	3.5	Thompson Road	Pleasant View - Saint Louis		
Route 156	15.4	9.6	Back Settlement Road, Palmer Road	Saint Edward - Nail Pond		
Route 157	8.4	5.2	Deblois Road	Saint Peter and Saint Paul - DeBlois		
Route 158	8.1	5.0	Harper Road	Harper - Peterville - Leoville		
Route 159	4.5	2.8	Peter Road	Peterville		
Route 160	4.5	2.8	Ascension Road	Tignish - Nail Pond		
Route 161	4.3	2.7	Broderick Road			
Route 162	5.0	3.1	O'Rourke Road	Greenmount		
Route 163	7.7	4.8	East Bideford Road, Sweetgrass Trail	East Bideford - Lennox Island First Nation		
Route 164	11.3	7.0	Hebron Road, Lecky Road	Derby - Hebron		
Route 165	11.0	6.8	Cannontown Road	Saint Timothee - Abrams Village		
Route 166	5.1	3.2	Bideford Road	Bideford - Tyne Valley		
Route 167	6.1	3.8	Allen Road	Tyne Valley - Arlington		
Route 168	5.3	3.3	Canadian Road	Foxley River		
Route 169	6.6	4.1	Port Hill Station Road	Mount Pleasant - Tyne Valley		
Route 170	9.8	6.1	Brae Harbour Road, McKellar Road	Brae		
Route 171	6.4	4.0	Callbeck Road, Dunk River Road	Central Bedeque - Middleton		
Route 172	4.8	3.0	Fortune Cove Road	Fortune Cove		
Route 173	5.2	3.2	Milligan Wharf Road	Freeland		
Route 174	5.3	3.3	Murray Road	Freeland - Murray Road		
Route 175	6.3	3.9	Conway Road	Freeland		
Route 176	9.9	6.2	MacDonald Road, Ramsay Road, Shaw Road	Glenwood		
Route 177	7.2	4.5	Mont Carmel Road	Wellington - Mont-Carmel		
Route 178	4.4	2.7	Canada Road	Tyne Valley - Northam		
Route 179	4.6	2.9	Goodwin Road, Maple Leaf Lane			
Route 180	8.0	5.0	Barbara Weit Road, Locke Shore Road	Sherbrooke		
Route 181	3.1	1.9	Taylor Road	Summerside (Decommissioned)		
Route 182	7.8	4.8	Nelligan Road, Norway Road	Christopher Cross - Norway		

=== Queens County ===
Route	Length (km)	Length (mi)	Local names	Communities	Notes	References
Route 201	16.5	10.3	Greys Road	Wood Islands - Murray River		
Route 202	11.7	7.3	Douses Road, Pleasant Valley Road			
Route 203	9.2	5.7	Culloden Road	Culloden		
Route 204	12.5	7.8	Gairloch Road, Hon. J. Angus MacLean Road	Lewes		
Route 205	9.9	6.2	Colville Road	Ocean View - Garfield		
Route 206	14.7	9.1	Iona Road, Macrae Road	Belfast - Fodhla - Iona - Bellevue - Heatherdale		
Route 207	16.7	10.4	Garfield Road, Stewart Road	Garfield - Belfast - Eldon		
Route 208	7.0	4.3	Roseberry Road	Roseberry		
Route 209	10.9	6.8	Point Prim Road	Mount Buchanan - Point Prim		
Route 210	15.8	9.8	Kinross Road, Queens Road	Kinross - Montague		
Route 211	7.2	4.5	Newtown Road	Newtown Cross		
Route 212	9.9	6.2	Glencoe Road, Scentia Road, Vernon River Road	Glencoe - Vernon River		
Route 213	18.8	11.7	Five Houses Road, Monaghan Road	Lake Verde - Clarkin - Watervale - Augustus		
Route 214	12.6	7.8	Dromore Road, Dunphy Road, MacKinnon Point Road	Pisquid West		
Route 215	14.2	8.8	Bethel Road, Tarantum Road	Tarantum		
Route 216	9.0	5.6	Avondale Road	Avondale		
Route 217	6.0	3.7	French Village Road			
Route 218	23.9	14.9	Blooming Point Road, Point Deroche Road, Portage Road, Savage Harbour Road	Ten Mile House - Tracadie - Blooming Point - Point Deroche - Savage Harbour		
Route 219	7.0	4.3	Donaldston Road	Tracadie - Corran Ban		
Route 220	10.0	6.2	Hardy Mill Road, Pleasant Grove Road, Horne Cross Road	Grand Tracadie - Pleasant Grove - Union Road		
Route 221	11.7	7.3	Union Road	Brackley - Union Road - Brackley Beach		
Route 222	13.2	8.2	Friston Road, Suffolk Road, Vickerson Road	Suffolk - Pleasant Grove - Stanhope		
Route 223	12.8	8.0	Winsloe Road	Winsloe South - Oyster Bed		
Route 224	25.5	15.8	New Glasgow Road, St. Mary's Road	Milton - Wheatley River - New Glasgow - Stanley Bridge		
Route 225	33.4	20.8		Warren Grove - Hampshire - North Wiltshire - Stanchel - Kinkora - Middleton		
Route 226	8.2	5.1	Darlington Road	Darlington		
Route 227	13.3	8.3	Johnson Road, Junction Road	Darlington - Glen Valley		
Route 228	4.8	3.0	Bertram Road, Hazel Grove Road			
Route 229	6.2	3.9	Dougan Road, East Suffolk Road, Millcove Road	Millcove - Suffolk		
Route 230	6.5	4.0	Smith Road			
Route 231	28.2	17.5	Inkerman Road, Millvale Road	Crapaud - Breadalbane - Millvale		
Route 232	17.5	10.9	Branch Road, County Line Road	Emerald Junction		
Route 233	5.7	3.5	County Line Road			
Route 234	8.3	5.2	Burlington Road, English Church Road	Long River - Burlington		
Route 235	16.7	10.4	Kingston Road	Cornwall - Kingston - Emyvale		
Route 236	2.1	1.3	Lower Malpeque Road	Charlottetown	Though officially terminating at the city limits, Route 236 is signed for an additional 7 kilometres (4.3 mi) within Charlottetown, to the southern terminus of North River Road at Brighton Road.	
Route 237	10.4	6.5	Appin Road, McKenna Road	Emyvale		
Route 238	11.0	6.8	Campbellton Road, Fountain Road, Wigmore Road	Founds Mills - Campbellton		
Route 239	9.3	5.8	New Orleans Road, Trout River Road	St. Patrick's - Millvale		
Route 240	7.2	4.5	North Road			
Route 241	5.2	3.2	New London Road, Toronto Road	Toronto		
Route 242	5.7	3.5	Grand Pere Point Road	Cymbria - South Rustico		
Route 243	16.4	10.2	Buntain Road, Church Road, Millboro Road	Brookfield - Wheatley River - South Rustico - Anglo Rustico		
Route 244	10.1	6.3	Peters Road	Strathgartney		
Route 245	7.3	4.5	Riverdale Road	Strathgartney - Green Bay - Emyvale		
Route 246	23.8	14.8	Breadalbane Road, Dixon Road, Maplewood Road, South Melville Road	DeSable - South Melville - Kellys Cross - Stanchel - Breadalbane		
Route 247	11.3	7.0	Bannockburn Road, Clyde River Road	Clyde River - Kingston - Hampshire		
Route 248	13.8	8.6	Ferry Road, North York River Road, York Point Road	Cornwall - York Point - North River - Warren Grove		
Route 249	7.8	4.8	Eliot River Road, Quinn Road	Green Bay		
Route 250	4.1	2.5	Kentyre Road, Kilkenny Road			
Route 251	9.9	6.2	Bungay Road, Crooked Creek Road	Hunter River - Wheatley River - Oyster Bed Bridge		
Route 252	4.5	2.8	MacLauchlan Road, Macmillan Point Road			
Route 253				Decommissioned		
Route 254	10.2	6.3	Rattenbury Road	Springfield - Stanley Bridge		
Route 255	8.5	5.3	Byis Lane, MCannel Road, Simpson Lane			
Route 256	8.7	5.4	Crabbe Road, Loyalist Road, MacKenzie Road	Warren Grove - Miltonvale Park - Winsloe South		
Route 257	17.6	10.9	Cape Breton Road, Fort Augustus Road, Whites Road	Mermaid - Donagh - Watervale		
Route 258	3.2	2.0	New Glasgow - Rusticoville			
Route 259	5.1	3.2	Settlement Road			
Route 260	7.9	4.9	Corrigan Road, Frenchfort Road	Dunstaffnage		
Route 261	3.0	1.9	Camp Road			
Route 262	8.1	5.0	Long River Road, Marks Road	Park Corner - Long River		
Route 263	4.4	2.7	Howatt Road, River Road	French River		
Route 264	5.1	3.2	Fredericton Station Road	Fredericton - Glen Valley		
Route 265	8.4	5.2	Linwood Road, Upper Meadowbank Road	Meadowbank		
Route 266	8.6	5.3	St. Patricks Road			
Route 267	5.1	3.2	Earnscliffe Road	Earnscliffe		
Route 268	6.7	4.2	China Point Road	China Point		
Route 269	2.9	1.8	Line Road	North Rustico		
Route 270	6.4	4.0	McInnis Point Road			
Route 271			Anderson Road	Mount Stewart (Decommissioned)		
Route 272			Village Green Road	Decommissioned		

=== Kings County ===
Route	Length (km)	Length (mi)	Local names	Communities	Notes	References
Route 301	6.1	3.8	Munns Road	Eastern Kings		
Route 302	11.4	7.1	Baltic Road	Red Point - Baltic - Priest Pond		
Route 303	20.2	12.6	Father James Road, New Harmony Road	Little Harbour - St. Catherines - Baltic		
Route 304	19.1	11.9	Grant Road, Glen Road, Tarantum Road	Souris River - Eastern Kings - Elmira		
Route 305	12.5	7.8	Chapel Avenue, Souris Line Road	Souris - Hermanville		
Route 306	12.2	7.6	New Zealand Road	Gowanbrae		
Route 307	11.1	6.9	Bear River Road	Rollo Bay - Bear River		
Route 308	12.0	7.5	Saint Charles Road	New Acadia		
Route 309	12.4	7.7	Selkirk Road	St. Charles		
Route 310	23.7	14.7	Annandale Road	Central Kings - Poplar Point - Little Pond - Howe Bay - Eglington - Bay Fortune - Fortune Bridge		
Route 311	31.4	19.5	Primrose Road, Water Street	Cardigan		
Route 312	15.1	9.4	Sparrows Road, Strathcona Road	Strathcona - St. Peter's Bay		
Route 313	29.2	18.1	Cardigan Road, Greenwich Road	Cardigan - Cardross - Corraville - St. Peter's Bay - Greenwich		
Route 314	9.0	5.6	Little River Road			
Route 315	23.0	14.3	Wood Islands Road	Montague - Kilmuir - Wood Islands		
Route 316	14.3	8.9	Heatherdale Road, Whim Road	Heatherdale		
Route 317	15.3	9.5	Brooklyn Road, Line Road			
Route 318	14.1	8.8	Saint Mary's Road			
Route 319	10.2	6.3	Brudenell Point Road, Robinson Road	Montague - Robertson - Brudenell		
Route 320	30.5	19.0	Brothers Road, Campbell Road, Greenfield Road, Peakes Road, Sparrows Road	Montague - Peakes		
Route 321	25.1	15.6	Bangor Road, Chapel Road, Martinvale Road, Shepard Road, Wharf Road	Cardigan - Cardross - Morell		
Route 322	13.1	8.1	Byrnes Road, Green Meadows Road, Little Flower Ave	Green Meadows - Morell		
Route 323	18.8	11.7	St. Patrick Road, Stanhope Road			
Route 324	17.1	10.6	Peters Road	Alliston		
Route 325	17.4	10.8	County Line Road, Dundee Road	Valleyfield - Uigg		
Route 326	12.0	7.5	Douses Road, Valleyfield Road	Montague - Valleyfield		
Route 327	9.0	5.6	Albion Road	Mount Hope - Albion Cross		
Route 328	8.6	5.3	Clay Road			
Route 329	8.5	5.3	Hazelgreen Road			
Route 330	5.4	3.4	Lower Rollo Bay Road	Lower Rollo Bay		
Route 331	8.1	5.0	Church Road			
Route 332	8.8	5.5	Fortune Road	Bay Fortune - Red House - Dingwells Mills		
Route 333	6.1	3.8	Elm Road, Macleod Road	Corraville		
Route 334	2.5	1.6	Woodville Road			
Route 335	2.8	1.7	Saint Catherines Road	Souris - St. Catherines		
Route 336	9.3	5.8		Cable Head - Greenwich		
Route 337	12.6	7.8	Milburn Road	Dingwell - Corraville		
Route 338	4.0	2.5	Upton Road			
Route 339	5.6	3.5	Gay Road, Ward Road	Strathcona		
Route 340	4.3	2.7	Fortune Wharf Road	Fortune Bridge - Fortune Harbour		
Route 341	4.6	2.9	France Road	Poplar Point		
Route 342	8.2	5.1	North Royalty Road	Georgetown - Montague Junction		
Route 343	4.2	2.6	Kayes Road, Stone Arch Road	Georgetown		
Route 344	4.1	2.5	Melrose Road, Portage Road			
Route 345	6.9	4.3	Benjies Road			
Route 346				Decommissioned		
Route 347	7.1	4.4	Chemin Panmure Island	Gaspereaux - Panmure Island		
Route 348	12.1	7.5	Gladstone Road, Livingstone Road	High Bank - Murray River		
Route 349	11.8	7.3	Comptons Road			
Route 350	12.4	7.7	Canavoy Road, Creek Road, Lakeside Road	Canavoy		
Route 351	7.7	4.8	South Main Street	Mount Stewart		
Route 352	12.5	7.8	Barr Road, Douglas Station Road, MacEwen's Creek Road	Canavoy - Green Meadows		
Route 353	10.4	6.5	Riverside Drive, South Montague Road	Montague		
Route 354	7.1	4.4	Dalmaney Road, Nielson Road	Heatherdale		
Route 355	12.9	8.0	Lorne Valley Road			
Route 356	8.8	5.5	Collins Road, Nicholson Road, Power Road			
Route 357	6.9	4.3	Goose River Road, Mickle Macum Road, Mill Road	Selkirk		
Route 358	5.5	3.4	Souris River Road	Souris - Souris River		
