= Prince Edward Island Route 1 =

Highway in Prince Edward Island

Route 1
- Trans-Canada Highway; Highway of Heroes
- Route 1 highlighted in red.

Route information
- Maintained by Prince Edward Island Department of Transportation and Infrastructure Renewal
- Length: 119.6 km (74.3 mi)

Major junctions
- West end: To Route 16 (TCH) at the Confederation Bridge
- Route 1A in Albany; Route 2 in Charlottetown; Route 3 in Mount Mellick
- East end: To Hwy 106 (TCH) at the Wood Islands ferry dock

Location
- Country: Canada
- Province: Prince Edward Island
- Counties: Prince, Queens
- Major cities: Charlottetown

Highway system
- Provincial highways in Prince Edward Island
← Route 358	→ Route 1A

Route 1 is a 120-kilometre (75 mi) long provincial highway that serves as the Prince Edward Island section of the Trans-Canada Highway. Route 1 traverses the southern shores of Prince Edward Island, from the Confederation Bridge in Borden-Carleton to the Wood Islands ferry dock, and bypasses the provincial capital, Charlottetown. It is an uncontrolled access 2-lane highway with a maximum speed limit of 90 km/h (55 mph), except within towns and urban areas.

== Route description ==
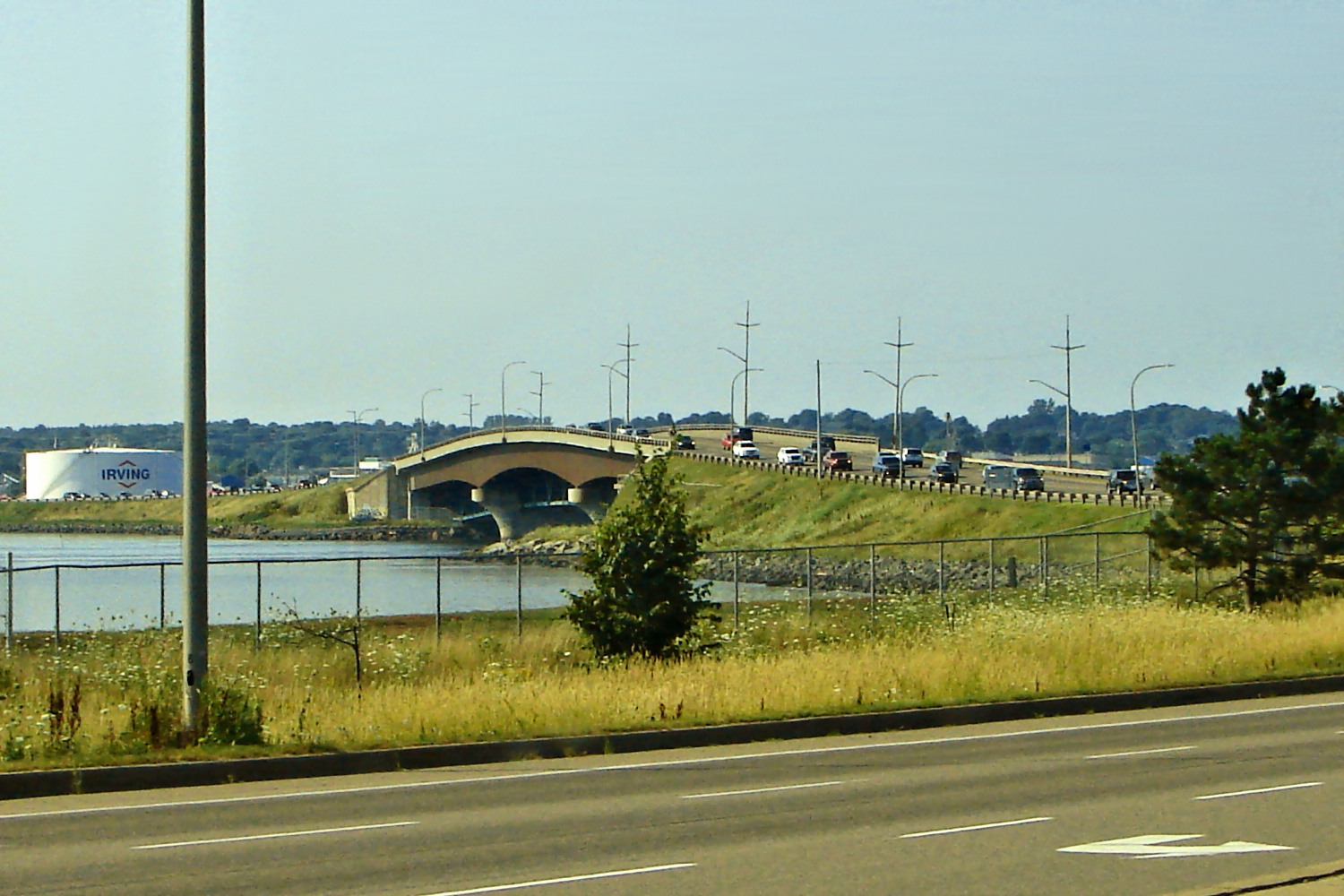
Route 1 at the Hillsborough River Bridge

Route 1 serves several towns and communities along the southern shore of Prince Edward Island, as well as bypassing the provincial capital, Charlottetown. The route begins at an intersection in Borden-Carleton at the northern end of the Confederation Bridge (the bridge itself and its approach roads are unnumbered federal roads). The bridge crosses the Northumberland Strait to New Brunswick, where the highway becomes New Brunswick Route 16. Travelling eastward, a spur route, Route 1A, branches north towards Summerside. The highway continues meandering east through the communities of Crapaud and Bonshaw, and bypasses Clyde River and Cornwall before crossing the waterway dividing the North River and Graham Rogers Lake into Charlottetown.

Within Charlottetown, Route 1 jogs north along Upton Road then east onto the Charlottetown Perimeter Highway, a four-lane controlled access road bypassing the city. The highway is partially concurrent with Route 2 and includes a displaced left turn intersection with the St. Peter's Highway. The road continues towards the city centre before turning and crossing the Hillsborough River on the Hillsborough River Bridge into Stratford. From there the route travels south near the shore of the Northumberland Strait to Wood Islands. Vehicles can continue via the Northumberland Ferries Limited ferry to Nova Scotia Highway 106 at Caribou, Nova Scotia.

Route 1 features the only grade-separated interchanges in the province: a trumpet interchange with the spur Route 1A in Albany, and double roundabout diamond interchanges at Route 27 in New Haven and Route 19 in Cornwall.

== History ==
On May 17, 2010, construction began on upgrades to the Charlottetown Perimeter Highway. This work was completed later that year on October 15. Route 1 was then transferred from its old routing along University Avenue and Grafton Street onto the new highway.

A proposal to realign Route 1 through Strathgartney Provincial Park west of Charlottetown was met with significant public opposition in 2011. Construction started on a revised route avoiding the park, dubbed Plan B by opponents, in October 2012. Environmentalists protesting at the work site caused construction to be halted for several days. Darcie Lanthier, then interim leader of the P.E.I. Green Party, was arrested and several protesters charged with trespassing before construction resumed. The realignment opened to traffic on September 23, 2013. The protest group, which became known as Stop Plan B, monitored construction throughout the project and returned in October 2015 to plant trees along the new alignment.

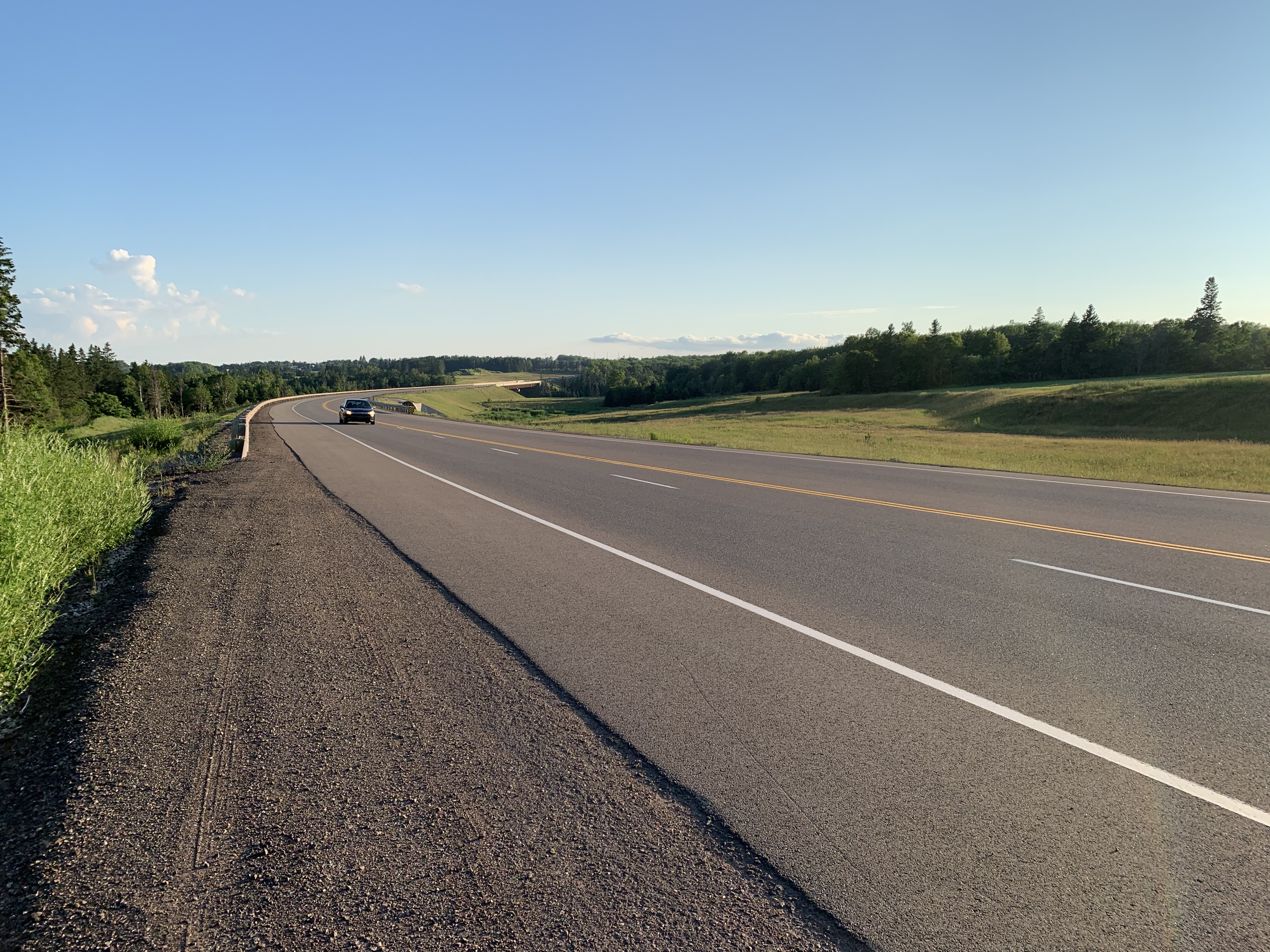
Route 1 on the Cornwall Perimeter Highway

On September 6, 2016, construction began on the Cornwall Perimeter Highway, a new alignment bypassing the town of Cornwall to the north. Construction was mostly complete and the new bypass opened to traffic on October 1, 2019. Upon its opening, the former alignment was renumbered Route 27. The town plans to develop the former arterial highway into a commercial thoroughfare and community hub.

== Major intersections ==
County	Location	km	mi	Destinations	Notes
Northumberland Strait (Abegweit Passage)		−9.2– −1.7	−5.7– −1.1	Confederation Bridge (toll leaving PEI); Route 16 (TCH) continues in New Brunswick	
Prince	Borden-Carleton	−0.7	−0.43	Toll booth (westbound only)	
Prince	Borden-Carleton	0.0	0.0	Borden Avenue (west) / Dickie Road (east)	West of this point the Confederation Bridge toll booths and approach ramps are under federal jurisdiction.
Prince	Borden-Carleton	1.8	1.1	Route 10 – Bedeque, Cape Traverse	
Prince	Albany	6.0	3.7	Route 1A north – Summerside	Interchange
Prince	North Tryon	11.1	6.9	Route 115 (Mount Tryon Road) – Mount Tryon	Intersections offset; 35 m (115 ft) concurrency
Prince		12.5	7.8	Route 232 north (Branch Road)	
Prince	Tryon	13.9	8.6	Route 10 west – Augustine Cove	
Queens	Crapaud	17.1	10.6	Route 13 north / Route 231 north – Cavendish	
Queens	Hampton	21.9	13.6	Route 116 (Shore Road / Sandy Point Road) – Victoria, South Melville	
Queens	DeSable	25.9	16.1	Route 19 south (Canoe Cove Road) / Route 246 north (South Melville Road) – Meadowbank, Stanchel	
Queens	Green Road	28.4	17.6	Route 237 north (Appin Road)	
Queens	Strathgartney	34.3	21.3	Route 245 north (Riverdale Road) – Riverdale, Emyvale	
Queens	New Haven	37.2	23.1	Route 9 north (Colville Road) – Elmwood, Kingston	West end of Route 9 concurrency
Queens	New Haven	37.6	23.4	Route 9 south (West River Road) – St. Catherines, Long Creek	East end of Route 9 concurrency
Queens	Clyde River	39.7	24.7	Route 27 east (Dog River Road) to Route 247 / Route 265 – Clyde River, Cornwall	Interchange, west end of Cornwall Perimeter Highway
Queens	Cornwall	45.1	28.0	To Route 19 / Cornwall Road – Cornwall	Interchange
Queens	Cornwall	47.3	29.4	Route 27 west (Main Street) – Cornwall; Route 248 (Warren Grove Road / York Point Road) – Milton	Roundabout, east end of Cornwall Perimeter Highway
Queens		47.7– 48.5	29.6– 30.1	North River Causeway crossing the North River and Graham Rogers Lake	
Queens	Charlottetown	49.1	30.5	Upton Road / Maypoint Road / Capital Drive	Roundabout; Route 1 branches north onto Upton Road
Queens	Charlottetown	50.2	31.2	Upton Road / Charlottetown Perimeter Highway	Roundabout; Route 1 branches east onto Charlottetown Perimeter Highway
Queens	Charlottetown	52.0	32.3	Route 2 west (Malpeque Road) – Kensington, Summerside	West end of Route 2 concurrency
Queens	Charlottetown	53.7	33.4	Route 15 north (Brackley Point Road) – Charlottetown Airport, Brackley Beach	
Queens	Charlottetown	55.2	34.3	Route 2 east (St. Peters Road) – Souris, Îles de la Madeleine	East end of Route 2 concurrency, displaced left turn
Queens	Charlottetown	59.1	36.7	Grafton Street / Water Street	Route 1 branches east onto Hillsborough Bridge
Queens		59.4– 60.7	36.9– 37.7	Hillsborough River Bridge crossing the Hillsborough River	
Queens	Stratford	61.1	38.0	Route 21 north (Hopeton Road) – Bunbury	
Queens	Stratford	63.1	39.2	Route 26 (Georgetown Road) – Tea Hill, Alexandria, Pownal	Roundabout
Queens	Mount Albion	71.7	44.6	Route 5 east (48 Road) – Cardigan	
Queens	Mount Mellick	74.0	46.0	Route 26 west (Pownal Road) / Route 272 east (Village Green Road) – Pownal, Village Green	
Queens	Mount Mellick	76.7	47.7	Route 3 east (Georgetown Road) – Georgetown	
Queens	Cherry Valley	78.4	48.7	Route 270 north (McInnis Point Road) – Earnscliffe, China Point	
Queens		83.2	51.7	Route 212 north (Vernon River Road) / Scentia Road – Vernon River	
Queens	Orwell	86.5	53.7	Route 210 east (Kinross Road) to Route 23 south – Kinross, Montague, Uigg	
Queens		92.0	57.2	Route 211 north (Newton Road) – Newton Cross	
Queens	Eldon	94.3	58.6	Route 207 south (Garfield Road)	
Queens		96.5	60.0	Route 209 west (Point Prim Road) – Mount Buchanan, Point Prim	
Queens	South Pinette	103.3	64.2	Route 208 east (Roseberry Road) – Roseberry	
Queens	Flat River	107.5	66.8	Route 261 east (Camp Road)	
Queens	Belle River	110.3	68.5	Route 202 (Douses Road) – Iris, Stewart Point	
Queens		110.9	68.9	Route 201 east (Greys Road) – Hopefield	
Queens		115.1	71.5	Route 207 north (Stewart Road) – Melville	
Queens	Wood Islands	117.8	73.2	Route 315 north (Wood Islands Road) – Montague	
Queens	Wood Islands	118.0	73.3	Route 4 east (Shore Road) – Murray River, Murray Harbour	
Queens	Wood Islands	119.3	74.1	Wood Islands Ferry Terminal	
Northumberland Strait				Northumberland Ferries Limited ferry to Caribou, Nova Scotia	
Northumberland Strait				Hwy 106 (TCH)	Continuation in Nova Scotia
1.000 mi = 1.609 km; 1.000 km = 0.621 mi: Concurrency terminus; Tolled

== See also ==
Trans-Canada Highway
Previous route NB Route 16	Route 1	Next route NS Highway 106
