= Prince Edward Island Route 225 =

Highway in Prince Edward Island, Canada

Route 225

Route information
- Maintained by Prince Edward Island Department of Transportation and Infrastructure Renewal
- Length: 33.4 km (20.8 mi)

Major junctions
- East end: To Route 248 in the Warren Grove
- Route 9 in North Wiltshire; Route 13 in North Wiltshire; Route 231 in Breadalbane
- West end: To Route 1A at MIddleton

Location
- Country: Canada
- Province: Prince Edward Island
- Counties: Prince, Queens

Highway system
- Provincial highways in Prince Edward Island
← Route 224	→ Route 226

Route 225 is a 33.4-kilometre (20.8 mi), two-lane, uncontrolled-access, secondary highway in central Prince Edward Island. Route 225 passes through the hilly central portion of Queens County, parallel to and roughly halfway between the Trans-Canada Highway (Route 1) and Route 2. Its speed limit is 80 km/h (50 mph) except within several villages along the route.

== Route description ==
From east to west, the route begins at an intersection with Route 248 near the community of Warren Grove. It proceeds slightly northeast through the communities of Hampshire and North Wiltshire, then turns due east at Hartsville. It then passes through Springton, Stanchel, and Rose Valley. At Shamrock the route enters Prince County and shortly thereafter the rural municipality of Kinkora. The route terminates at Route 1A in the community of Middleton.

== Major intersections ==
County	Location	km	mi	Destinations	Notes
Queens	Warren Grove	0.0	0.0	Route 248 (North York River Road)	5 km (3.1 mi) to Charlottetown via Route 248, Route 1
Queens	Warren Grove	0.9	0.56	Route 256 (Loyalist Road)	
Queens	Hampshire	4.7	2.9	Route 247 (Bannockburn Road)	
Queens	North Wiltshire	5.4	3.4	Route 9 (Colville Road)	
Queens	North Wiltshire	9.1	5.7	Route 226 (Darlington Road)	
Queens	North Wiltshire	10.9	6.8	Route 244 (Peters Road)	
Queens	North Wiltshire	12.3	7.6	Route 13 (Dock Rd / Hopedale Road)	
Queens	North Wiltshire	16.6	10.3	Route 264 (Fredericton Station Road)	
Queens	Stanchel	19.7	12.2	Route 246 (Dixon Road / Maplewood Road)	
Queens	Breadalbane	22.1	13.7	Route 231 (Inkerman Road)	
Queens	Shamrock	25.4	15.8	Route 232 (County Line Road)	
Prince	Kinkora	28.9	18.0	Route 114 (Maple Plains Road)	
Prince	Kinkora	30.5	19.0	Route 109 (Somerset Street / Scales Pond Road)	
Prince	Middleton	33.4	20.8	Route 1A	12 km (7.5 mi) to Summerside via Route 1A; 12 km (7.5 mi) to Confederation Bridge via Route 1A, Route 1
1.000 mi = 1.609 km; 1.000 km = 0.621 mi: Concurrency terminus
