= Prince Edward Island Route 1A =

Highway in Prince Edward Island

Route 1A
- Route 1A highlighted in red.

Route information
- Auxiliary route of Route 1 (TCH)
- Maintained by Prince Edward Island Department of Transportation and Infrastructure Renewal
- Length: 20.2 km (12.6 mi)

Major junctions
- South end: Route 1 (TCH) in Albany
- North end: Route 2 near Summerside

Location
- Country: Canada
- Province: Prince Edward Island
- Counties: Prince
- Major cities: Summerside

Highway system
- Provincial highways in Prince Edward Island
| ← Route 1 (TCH) | → Route 2 |

Route 1A is a 20-kilometre (12 mi) long provincial highway in central Prince Edward Island. The route is a spur route of the Route 1 which connects the Trans-Canada Highway near Borden-Carleton and the Confederation Bridge with the city of Summerside. It is an uncontrolled access 2-lane highway with a maximum speed limit of 90 km/h (55 mph) and is considered a "Core route" of Canada's National Highway System. Route 1A is unnamed except for the portion within Summerside city limits, where it is known as Read Drive.

== Major intersections ==
The entire route is in Prince County.

| Location | km | mi | Destinations | Notes |
|---|---|---|---|---|
| Albany | 0.0 | 0.0 | Route 1 (TCH) – Borden-Carleton, Confederation Bridge, Crapaud, Charlottetown | Interchange |
| Albany | 0.7 | 0.43 | Route 112 north (Junction Road) | |
| | 1.3 | 0.81 | Route 115 (Mount Tyron Road) – Searletown, Mount Tyron | |
| Middletown | 5.0 | 3.1 | Route 225 east (Anderson Road) – Kinkora | |
| Middletown | 5.3 | 3.3 | Route 111 (Newton Road / Middletown Road) | Intersections offset; 50 m (160 ft) concurrency |
| | 6.4 | 4.0 | Route 171 north (Dunk River Road) to Route 110 – Lower Freetown | |
| | 9.5 | 5.9 | Route 10 south (North Carlton Road Extension) – Searletown | |
| Central Bedeque | 10.1 | 6.3 | Route 171 (Dunk River Road / Callbeck Street) – Bedeque, Freetown | |
| | 12.5 | 7.8 | Route 8 east (Freetown Road) – Lower Freetown, New London | |
| | 13.0 | 8.1 | Route 120 north (MacMurdo Road) | |
| | 16.2 | 10.1 | Route 181 east (Taylor Road) | |
| Summerside | 17.1 | 10.6 | Route 107 east (Blue Shank Road) – Norboro, Kelvin Grove | |
| Summerside | 18.4 | 11.4 | Route 11 west (Water Street) | |
| Travellers Rest | 20.2 | 12.6 | Route 2 (All Weather Highway) – Summerside, Tignish, Kensington, Charlottetown | Roundabout |
1.000 mi = 1.609 km; 1.000 km = 0.621 mi: Concurrency terminus
