= Prince Edward Island Route 4 =

Highway in Prince Edward Island, Canada

Route 4

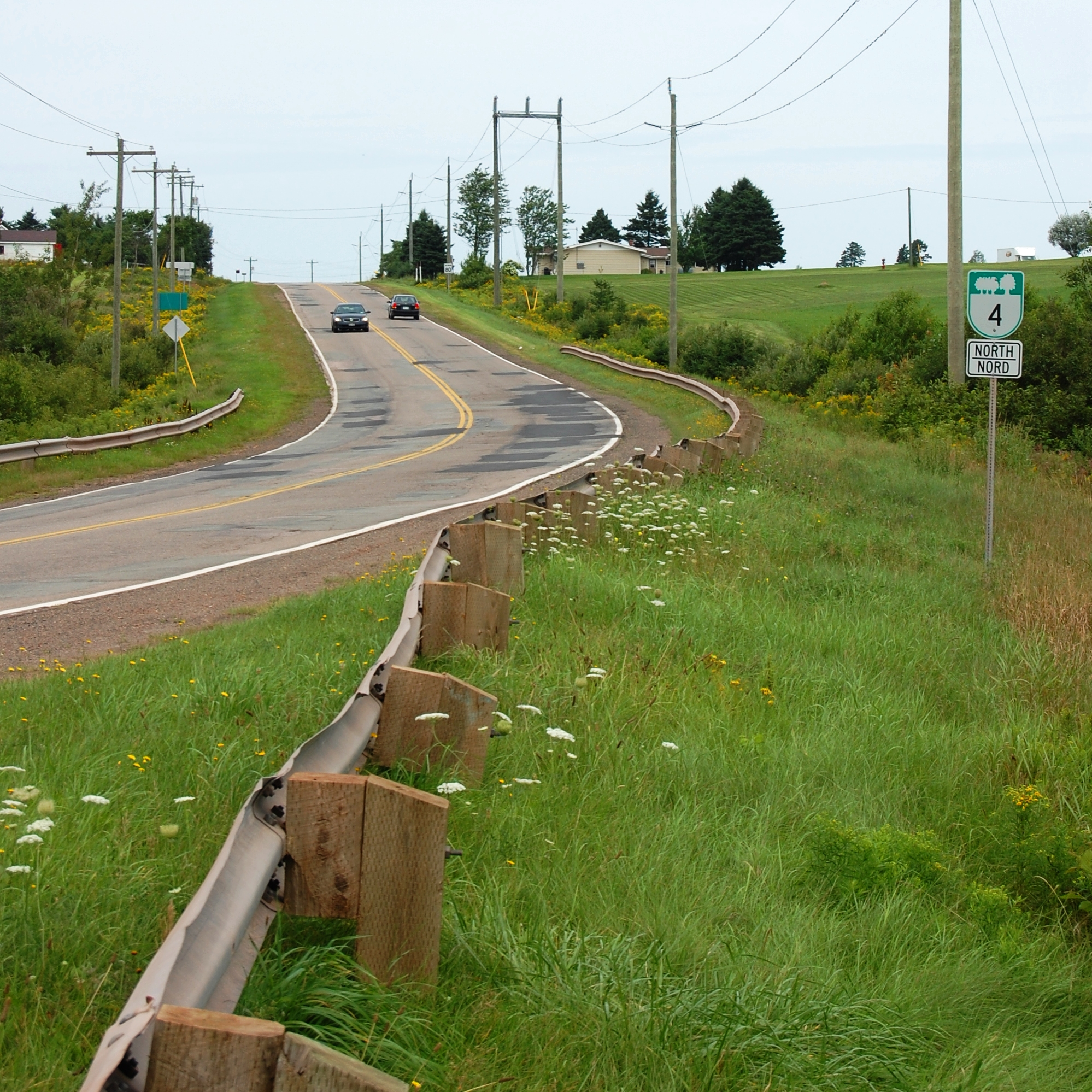
- Route 4 near Cardigan

Route information
- Maintained by Transportation and Public Works
- Length: 64.9 km (40.3 mi)

Major junctions
- South end: Route 1 (TCH) at Wood Islands
- Route 24 in Murray River Route 17 at Murray River and Montague; Route 3 near Montague Route 5 near Cardigan
- North end: Route 2 at Dingwells Mills

Location
- Country: Canada
- Province: Prince Edward Island
- Counties: Kings, Queens

Highway system
- Provincial highways in Prince Edward Island
← Route 3	→ Route 5

Route 4 is a 63 km (39 mi) long, two-lane uncontrolled access secondary highway in eastern Prince Edward Island, Canada. In runs east from the Trans-Canada Highway (Route 1) at Wood Islands along the Northumberland Strait to Route 18 the settlement of High Bank, where it turns north and passes through Murray River and Montague before ending at Route 2 at Dingwells Mills. Its maximum speed limit is 90 km/h (56 mph).

Route 4 is designated an arterial highway for approximately 30 kilometres (19 mi) from Route 2 in Dingwells Mills to Route 17 in Montague; the remainder is designated a collector highway.

== Names ==
Route 4 has several local names:

- Shore Road (Wood Islands to High Bank)
- Normans Road (High Bank to Murray River)
- Commercial Road (Murray River to Montague)
- A.A. Macdonald Highway (Montague to Pooles Corner)
- Alleys Mill Road (Pooles Corner to Cardigan)
- Seven Mile Road (Cardigan to Dundas)
- Dundas Road (Dundas to Dingwells Mills)

== Major intersections ==
From south to north:

County	Location	km	mi	Destinations	Notes
Queens	Wood Islands	0.0	0.0	To Route 1 (TCH) / Route 315 north (Wood Islands Road) – Montague, Charlottetown, Caribou (via ferry)	Southern terminus
Queens		6.1	3.8	Route 325 north (County Line Road)	
Kings	High Bank	10.8	6.7	Route 348 north (Livingston Road)	
Kings		12.4	7.7	Route 18 east (Cape Bear Road) – Murray Harbour	
Kings	Murray River	17.1	10.6	Route 18 west (Cape Bear Road) – Murray Harbour	Signed as Route 18 west but heads east
Kings	Murray River	17.6	10.9	Route 348 (Gladstone Road / MacInnis Street Road)	Intersections offset, 30 m (100 ft) concurrency
Kings	Murray River	17.9	11.1	Route 202 west (Riverside Drive)	
Kings	Murray River	18.3	11.4	Route 24 – Vernon River, Dover	Roundabout
Kings		19.1	11.9	Route 17 east – Point Pleasant	
Kings	Alliston	23.3	14.5	Route 324 (Peters Road)	
Kings	St. Marys Road	26.1	16.2	Route 318 (St. Marys Road)	
Kings	Milltown Cross	28.4	17.6	Route 317 (Brooklyn Road / Line Road)	
Kings	Commercial Cross	31.2	19.4	Route 316 (Heatherdale Road / Whim Road)	Intersections offset, 40 m (130 ft) concurrency
Kings	Montague	33.9	21.1	Route 315 south – Wood Islands Road	
Kings	Montague	34.6	21.5	Route 326 (Valleyfield Road / Dousse Road) – Valleyfield, Lower Montague	Roundabout
Kings	Montague	35.4	22.0	Route 17 east (Main Street) – Lower Montague	
Kings	Montague	35.7	22.2	Route 353 west (Riverside Drive)	
Kings	Montague	36.2	22.5	Route 210 west (Queens Road)	
Kings	Montague	36.8	22.9	Route 319 east (Robertson Road)	
Kings		39.4	24.5	Route 319 east (Brundenell Point Road)	
Kings		40.0	24.9	Route 356 north (Power Road)	
Kings	Pooles Corner	41.0	25.5	Route 3 – Charlottetown, Georgetown	Roundabout
Kings		44.2	27.5	Route 5 west / Shore Road – Mount Albion, Cardigan	
Kings		44.5	27.7	Route 329 north (Hazelgreen Road)	
Kings		45.5	28.3	Route 313 north (Cardigan Road)	
Kings		46.6	29.0	Route 321 south (Chapel Road) – Cardigan	South end of Route 321 concurrency
Kings		47.1	29.3	Route 321 north (Shepard Road)	North end of Route 321 concurrency
Kings	Primrose	54.4	33.8	Route 312 north (Strathcona Road)	
Kings	Primrose	54.8	34.1	Route 311 south (Primrose Road)	
Kings	Bridgetown	56.4	35.0	Route 312 north (Strathcona Road)	
Kings	Dundas	58.1	36.1	Route 310 south (Annandale Road)	
Kings	Dundas	58.4	36.3	Route 314 east (Little River Road)	
Kings	Albion Cross	60.7	37.7	Route 327 (Albion Road)	
Kings	Dingwell Mills	64.9	40.3	Route 2 / Route 332 south (Fortune Road) – Charlottetown, Souris, Red House	Northern terminus
1.000 mi = 1.609 km; 1.000 km = 0.621 mi: Concurrency terminus
