= Prince Edward Island Route 248 =

Highway in Prince Edward Island

Route 248

Route information
- Maintained by Prince Edward Island Department of Transportation and Infrastructure Renewal
- Length: 13.9 km (8.6 mi)

Major junctions
- West end: Route 27 in Cornwall
- Route 1 (TCH) in Cornwall
- North end: Route 2 in Miltonvale Park

Location
- Country: Canada
- Province: Prince Edward Island
- Counties: Queens

Highway system
- Provincial highways in Prince Edward Island
| ← Route 247 | → Route 249 |

Prince Edward Island Route 248 (also known as Route 248) is a 13.9-kilometre (8.6 mi) long north–south collector highway and local road in Queens County, Prince Edward Island. Route 248 begins at an intersection with Route 27 in the community of Cornwall just east of Route 19. The route parallels MacEwens Creek and the North River through farms and suburbs northeast of Cornwall into the village of Miltonvale Park, where it terminates at a junction with Route 2. The route also serves as the main road through the community of Warren Grove.

== Route description ==
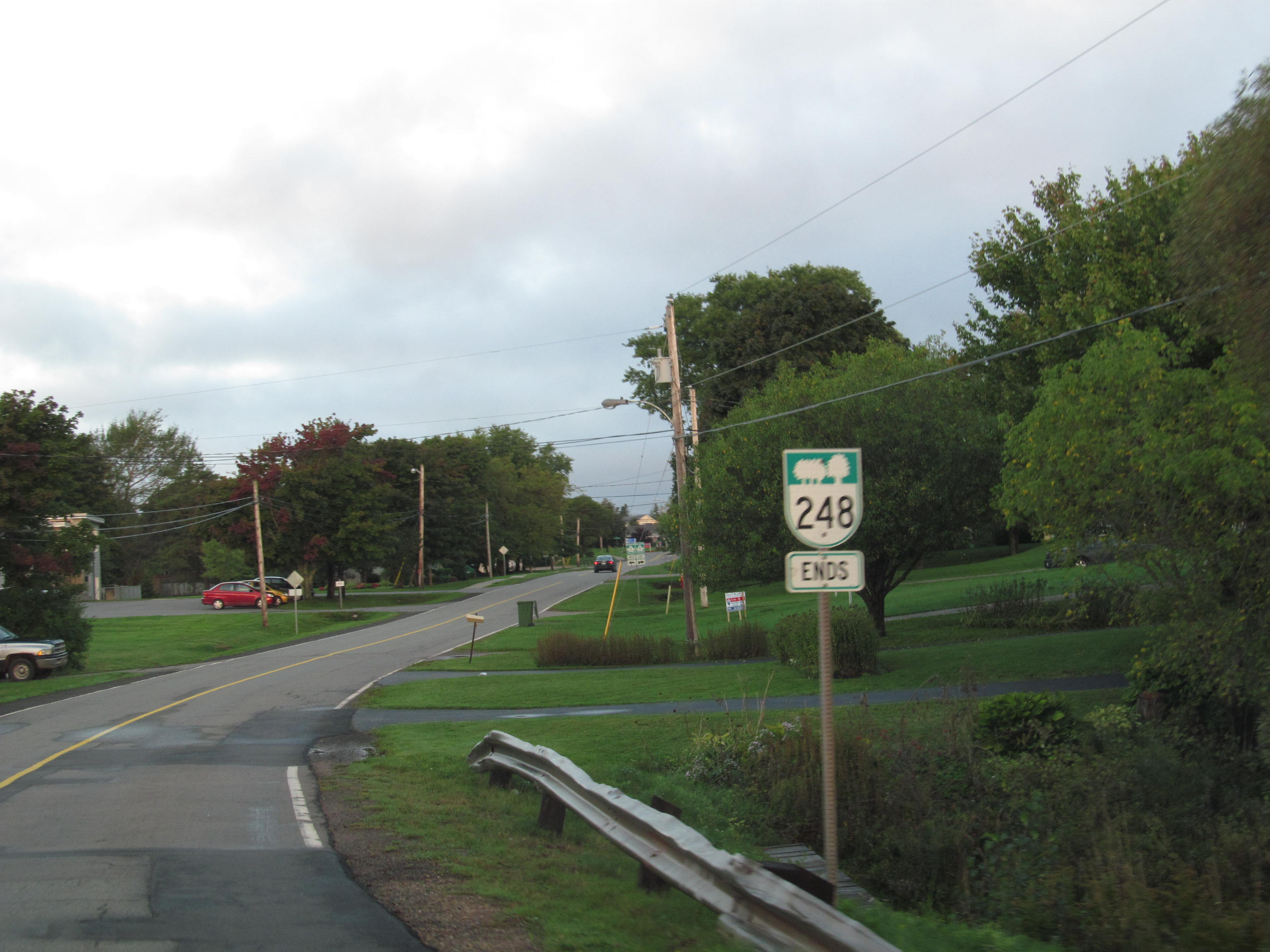
Route 248 approaching its western terminus at Route 27 in the community of Cornwall

Route 248 begins at an intersection with Route 27 (Main Street) in the community of Cornwall. Route 248 proceeds eastward through Cornwall along Ferry Road, a two-lane residential street. Crossing over Mill Creek, the route leaves Cornwall, continuing east through the flat lands near Charlottetown. Paralleling McEwens Creek, Ferry Road reaches a junction with York Point Road, where Route 248 turns north on York Point. Crossing through a rural section of Cornwall, the route runs north along the North River, soon reaching a commercial section of the town, where it enters an at-grade roundabout with Routes 1 and 27, and continues north as Warren Grove Road.

Just north of the roundabout, the route intersects with the eastern terminus of Route 235 (Kingston Road). After Route 235, Route 248 crosses northwest into the town of Warren Grove, where it becomes North York River Road, a two-lane rural road. Paralleling the North River, Route 248 bends northward into a fork with the terminus of Route 225. North of Route 225, Route 248 continues north, no longer designated a collector highway, through the town of Warren Grove, soon crossing into the village of Miltonvale Park. Retaining the North York River Road moniker, Route 248 reaches the shores of the North River, crossing between the river and numerous residences on the southbound lanes.

After a curve to the northeast, the route crosses over the river and runs northeast into a junction with Route 2. This junction serves as the northern terminus of Route 248, just west of the center of Miltonvale Park.

== Major intersections ==
The entire route is in Queens County.

| Location | km | mi | Destinations | Notes |
|---|---|---|---|---|
| Cornwall | 0.0 | 0.0 | Route 1 (TCH) | |
| Cornwall | 7.6 | 4.7 | Route 1 (TCH) / Route 27 (Main Street) | Roundabout |
| Cornwall | 7.7 | 4.8 | Route 235 (Kingston Road) | Eastern terminus of Route 235 |
| Warren Grove | 10.9 | 6.8 | Route 225 | Eastern terminus of Route 225 |
| Miltonvale Park | 13.9 | 8.6 | Route 2 | |
1.000 mi = 1.609 km; 1.000 km = 0.621 mi
