= Prince Edward Island Route 24 =

Highway in Prince Edward Island, Canada

Route 24
- Dover Road; Murray Harbour Road

Route information
- Maintained by the Department of Transportation, Infrastructure, and Energy
- Length: 29.3 km (18.2 mi)

Major junctions
- South end: Route 4 in Murray River
- Route 315 in Caledonia
- North end: Route 3 in Vernon River

Location
- Country: Canada
- Province: Prince Edward Island
- Counties: Kings, Queens

Highway system
- Provincial highways in Prince Edward Island
← Route 23	→ Route 25

Route 24, also known as Dover Road and Murray Harbour Road, is a 29.3-kilometre (18.2 mi), two-lane, uncontrolled-access, secondary highway in Prince Edward Island. Its southern terminus is at Route 4 in Murray River and its northern terminus is at Route 3 in Vernon River. The route is in Kings and Queens counties.

== Route description ==
The route begins at its southern terminus and heads northwest, where it meets with Route 204 for a short east–west concurrency. It then crosses the county line between Kings and Queens counties, continues northwest, and ends at its northern terminus.

== Junction list ==
County	Location	km	mi	Junction	Notes
Kings	Murray River	0.0	0.0	Route 4	Southern terminus of route
Kings	Dover	6.0	3.7	Route 324	Eastern terminus of concurrency with Route 324
Kings	Dover	7.4	4.6	Route 324	Western terminus of concurrency with Route 324
Queens	Caledonia	10.2	6.3	Route 315	
Queens	Caledonia	13.5	8.4	Route 317	
Queens	Caledonia	13.8	8.6	Route 205	
Queens	Bellevue	16.5	10.3	Route 206	
Queens	Bellevue	18.7	11.6	Route 326	
Queens	Kinross	20.3	12.6	Route 211	
Queens	Kinross	22.4	13.9	Route 210	Southern terminus of concurrency with Route 210
Queens	Uigg	23.4	14.5	Route 210	Northern terminus of concurrency with Route 210
Queens	Uigg	23.8	14.8	Route 325	
Queens	Vernon River	28.3	17.6	Route 212	
Queens	Vernon River	29.3	18.2	Route 3	Northern terminus of route
