= Prince Edward Island Route 9 =

Highway in Prince Edward Island, Canada

Route 9

Route information
- Maintained by Department of Transportation, Infrastructure, and Energy
- Length: 18.1 km (11.2 mi)

Major junctions
- South end: Route 19A in Long Creek
- Route 247 in Clyde River; Route 1 (TCH) in Bonshaw; Route 235 in Kingston; Route 225 in Hampshire
- North end: Route 2 in North Wiltshire

Location
- Country: Canada
- Province: Prince Edward Island
- Counties: Queens

Highway system
- Provincial highways in Prince Edward Island
← Route 8	→ Route 10

Route 9 is a 13.1 km (8.1 mi), two-lane, uncontrolled-access, secondary highway in central Prince Edward Island. Its southern terminus is at Route 19A in Clyde River and its northern terminus is at Route 2 in North Wiltshire.

== Route description ==
The route begins at its southern terminus and heads north, turns right, and goes over the Clyde River. It then turns left in Bonshaw for a 400 m (1,300 ft) concurrency with Route 1. Turning right to leave the concurrency, it continues north until it reaches its northern terminus.
