= Prince Edward Island Route 13 =

Highway in Prince Edward Island, Canada

Route 13
- Hopedale Road
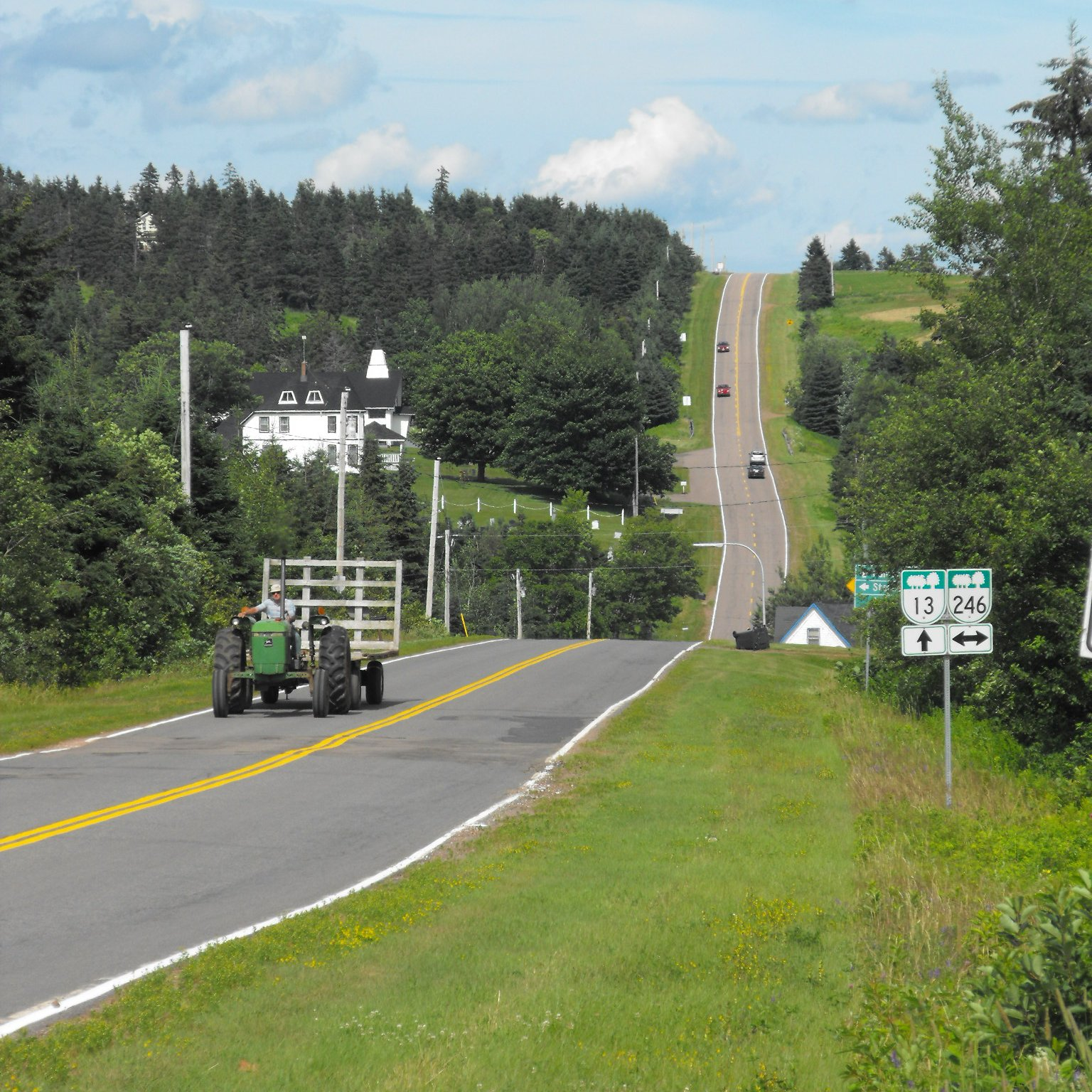

Route information
- Maintained by Transportation and Public Works
- Length: 38.8 km (24.1 mi)

Major junctions
- South end: Route 1 (TCH) in Crapaud
- Route 2 in Hunter River; Route 6 in Cavendish
- North end: Prince Edward Island National Park

Location
- Country: Canada
- Province: Prince Edward Island
- Counties: Queens

Highway system
- Provincial highways in Prince Edward Island
← Route 12	→ Route 14

Route 13 is a 39 km (24 mi) two-lane uncontrolled access secondary highway traversing the central portion of Prince Edward Island, Canada in a more or less north–south direction between Crapaud and Cavendish. It passes through a mainly rural area of Prince Edward Island. A portion of Route 13 (south of Hunter River) is commonly called the "Hopalong Road."

There is an important intersection with Route 2 at Hunter River. There are minor intersections with Route 225 in the rural community of Hopedale (where it is called Hopedale Road), Route 246 in Kellys Cross and Route 224 in New Glasgow. Route 13 intersects with Route 235 (Kingston Road) east of Brookvale. In Cavendish it intersects with Route 6 and terminates at Gulf Shore Road inside Prince Edward Island National Park.

== Major intersections ==
The entire route is in Queens County.

Location	km	mi	Destinations	Notes
Crapaud	0.0	0.0	Route 1 (TCH) – Borden-Carleton, Charlottetown	Southern terminus
Crapaud	0.08	0.050	Route 231 north (Inkerman Road)	
Kellys Cross	6.9	4.3	Route 246 (Maplewood Road / South Melville Road)	
	12.1	7.5	Route 235 east (Kingston Road)	
	15.2	9.4	Route 225 – Kinkora, North Wiltshire	
	16.6	10.3	Route 227 (Johnston Road)	
Hunter River	21.4	13.3	Route 2 – Summerside, Charlottetown	
Hunter River	21.9	13.6	Route 251 east (Bungay Road)	
	27.1	16.8	Route 224 west (St. Marys Road)	South end of Route 224 concurrency
New Glasgow	28.0	17.4	Route 224 east (New Glasgow Road) to Route 258 north	North end of Route 224 concurrency
Mayfield	32.7	20.3	Route 269 east (Line Road) – North Rustico	
	33.5	20.8	Route 241 west – Toronto	
Cavendish	37.7	23.4	Route 6 (Cavendish Road) – Stanley Bridge, Kensington, North Rustico	
Prince Edward Island National Park	38.8	24.1	West Gulf Shore Parkway	Northern terminus; roadway continues east
1.000 mi = 1.609 km; 1.000 km = 0.621 mi: Concurrency terminus; Route transition
