= John Bonnell =

Canadian politician

John Cranston Bonnell

Assemblyman for 4th Kings
- In office December 4, 1972 – 1974
- Preceded by: Lorne Bonnell
- Succeeded by: Charles Fraser

Personal details
- Born: January 23, 1929 Hopefield, Prince Edward Island
- Died: May 31, 1980 (aged 51)
- Party: Liberal

John Cranston Bonnell (January 23, 1929 - May 31, 1980) was a Canadian politician, who represented the electoral district of 4th Kings in the Legislative Assembly of Prince Edward Island from 1972 to 1974.

He was first elected to the legislature in a by-election on December 4, 1972, after the seat was made vacant by his brother Lorne Bonnell's appointment to the Senate of Canada. He served until the 1974 election, in which he did not run for another term.

John and Lorne Bonnell were the grandsons of Mark Bonnell, who represented the same electoral district in the 1920s.

Bonnell graduated from Dalhousie University with a medical degree in 1960, and practiced as a physician in Montague, Bedeque and Charlottetown. He later specialized in the treatment of arthritis, and eventually became director of the Prince Edward Island Rehabilitation Centre.

He briefly moved to Okolona, Mississippi in 1979 to start a new medical practice there, but returned to Prince Edward Island in April 1980 after falling ill. He died on May 31, 1980, in Murray River.
