= Prince Edward Island Route 3 =

Highway in Prince Edward Island, Canada

Route 3

Route information
- Maintained by Transportation and Public Works
- Length: 33 km (21 mi)

Major junctions
- West end: Route 1 (TCH) near Cherry Valley
- Route 24 at Vernon River; Route 22 at New Perth; Route 4 near Montague
- East end: Georgetown

Location
- Country: Canada
- Province: Prince Edward Island
- Counties: Queens, Prince

Highway system
- Provincial highways in Prince Edward Island
← Route 2	→ Route 4

Route 3 is a 33 km (21 mi) long, two-lane uncontrolled access secondary highway in Prince Edward Island, Canada. Its maximum speed limit is 90 km/h (55 mph).

Route 3, also known locally as the Montague Road or the Georgetown Road, connects the most populated part of Kings County (the Montague-Georgetown area) with Charlottetown.

== Major intersections ==
County	Location	km	mi	Destinations	Notes
Queens		0.0	0.0	Route 1 (TCH) – Wood Islands, Charlottetown	
Queens		5.3	3.3	Route 213 north (Monaghan Road)	
Queens	Vernon River	7.2	4.5	Route 216 north (Avondale Road)	
Queens	Vernon River	7.6	4.7	Route 24 south – Murray River	
Queens		10.3	6.4	Route 212 west (Glencoe Road)	
Kings	Summerville	13.9	8.6	Route 151 south (Greenfield Road)	West end of Route 151 concurrency
Kings	Summerville	14.2	8.8	Route 151 north (Brothers Road)	East end of Route 151 concurrency
Kings	New Perth	17.3– 17.4	10.7– 10.8	Route 22 (Baldwins Road / Union Road) – Mount Stewart	Intersections offset; 140 m (460 ft) concurrency
Kings		20.4	12.7	Route 356 north (Collins Road)	West end of Route 356 concurrency
Kings		20.7	12.9	Route 356 south (Power Road)	East end of Route 356 concurrency
Kings	Pooles Corner	22.1	13.7	Route 4 – Souris, Montague	Roundabout
Kings		25.6	15.9	Route 321 north (Wharf Road)	
Kings		29.5	18.3	Route 343 east (Keyes Road)	
Kings	Georgetown	32.1	19.9	Route 342 west (Royalty Road)	
Kings	Georgetown	33.4	20.8	dead end	
1.000 mi = 1.609 km; 1.000 km = 0.621 mi: Concurrency terminus
