= Prince Edward Island Route 27 =

Highway in Prince Edward Island

Route 27
- Dog River Road; Main Street

Route information
- Maintained by the Department of Transportation, Infrastructure, and Energy
- Length: 7.6 km (4.7 mi)

Major junctions
- West end: Route 1 (TCH) in Clyde River
- East end: Route 1 (TCH) / Route 248 in Cornwall

Location
- Country: Canada
- Province: Prince Edward Island
- Counties: Queens

Highway system
- Provincial highways in Prince Edward Island
← Route 26	→ Route 101

Route 27, also known as Main Street and Dog River Road, is a 7.5-kilometre (4.7 mi), two-lane, uncontrolled-access, secondary highway in central Prince Edward Island. Route 27 was created upon the opening of a new alignment of Route 1 bypassing the town of Cornwall on October 21, 2019. The route is entirely in Queens County.

== Route description ==
The route constitutes the former alignment of Route 1 through the town of Cornwall. The route diverges from Route 1 at an interchange east of the community of New Haven and proceeds eastward through the Clyde River valley into Cornwall, constituting the town's main street. The road curves northward at an intersection with Route 19 and continues through the town and farmland to the northeast. The route ends at a roundabout intersection with routes 1 and 248 in the community of North River.

== Major intersections ==
The entire route is in Queens County.

Location	km	mi	Destinations	Notes
Clyde River	0.0	0.0	Route 1 (TCH) – Borden-Carleton, Charlottetown	Interchange
Clyde River	0.8– 1.0	0.50– 0.62	Route 247 (Bannockburn Road / Clyde River Road)	Intersections offset, 130 m (430 ft) concurrency
Clyde River	2.1	1.3	Route 265 south (Upper Meadowbank Road)	
Cornwall	3.9	2.4	Route 19 south (Meadowbank Road) / Cornwall Road	
Cornwall	4.0	2.5	Route 248 east (Ferry Road)	
Cornwall	7.6	4.7	Route 1 (TCH) – Borden-Carleton, Charlottetown; Route 248 (Warren Grove Road / York Point Road) – Milton	Roundabout
1.000 mi = 1.609 km; 1.000 km = 0.621 mi: Concurrency terminus
