= Prince Edward Island Route 10 =

Highway in Prince Edward Island, Canada

Route 10

Route information
- Maintained by Department of Transportation, Infrastructure, and Energy
- Length: 23.2 km (14.4 mi)

Major junctions
- West end: Route 1A in Bedeque and Area
- Route 112 in Albany; Route 118 in Borden-Carleton; Route 1 (TCH) in Borden-Carleton; Route 115 in Albany
- East end: Route 1 (TCH) in Tryon

Location
- Country: Canada
- Province: Prince Edward Island
- Counties: Prince

Highway system
- Provincial highways in Prince Edward Island
← Route 9	→ Route 11

Route 10 is a 23.2 km (14.4 mi), two-lane, uncontrolled-access, secondary provincial highway in western Prince Edward Island, Canada. Its western terminus is at Route 1A in Bedeque and Area and its eastern terminus is at Route 1 in Tryon.

== Route description ==
The route begins at its western terminus and heads south, snaking its way to Borden-Carleton. It then turns southeast and goes to Cape Traverse. It then goes eastward until it reached its eastern terminus in Tryon.

== Places along route ==
- Borden-Carleton
- Cape Traverse
- Augustine Cove
- Tyron
