= Prince Edward Island Route 315 =

Road in Prince Edward Island, Canada

Route 315
- Wood Islands Road

Route information
- Maintained by the Department of Transportation, Infrastructure, and Energy
- Length: 23.1 km (14.4 mi)

Major junctions
- South end: Route 1 (TCH) in Wood Islands
- Route 201 in Wood Islands; Route 23 in Wood Islands; Route 202 in Culloden; Route 203 in Culloden; Route 204 in Lewes; Route 24 / Route 318 / Route 325 in Lewes; Route 317 in Heatherdale; Route 316 in Heatherdale
- North end: Route 4 in Montague

Location
- Country: Canada
- Province: Prince Edward Island
- Counties: Queens, Kings

Highway system
- Provincial highways in Prince Edward Island
← Route 314	→ Route 316

Route 315, also known as Wood Islands Road, is a 23.1-kilometre (14.4 mi), two-lane, uncontrolled-access, local highway in Prince Edward Island. Its southern terminus is at Route 1 in Wood Islands, and its northern terminus is at Route 4 in Montague. It generally forms a straight line between the termini. The route is in Queens and Kings counties.
