= Prince Edward Island Route 321 =

Road in Prince Edward Island, Canada

Route 321

Route information
- Maintained by the Department of Transportation, Infrastructure, and Energy
- Length: 25.1 km (15.6 mi)

Major junctions
- South end: Route 3 in Lot 53
- Route 311 in Cardigan; Route 4 in Cardigan; Route 313 in Cardross; Route 320 in Riverton
- North end: Route 2 in Morell

Location
- Country: Canada
- Province: Prince Edward Island
- Counties: Kings

Highway system
- Provincial highways in Prince Edward Island
← Route 320	→ Route 322

Route 321 is a 25.1-kilometre (15.6 mi), two-lane, uncontrolled-access, local highway in eastern Prince Edward Island. Its southern terminus is at Route 3 in Lot 53 and its northern terminus is at Route 2 in Morell. The route is entirely in Kings County.

== Route description ==
The route begins at its southern terminus and heads north, crossing the Cardigan River. It joins Route 4 for a 450-metre (1,480 ft) concurrency before continuing north. It then curves east and then curves back north before ending at its northern terminus.
