= Prince Edward Island Route 17 =

Highway in Prince Edward Island, Canada

Route 17
- Point Pleasant Road

Route information
- Maintained by the Department of Transportation, Infrastructure, and Energy
- Length: 36.9 km (22.9 mi)

Major junctions
- South end: Route 4 in Murray River
- Route 17A in Murray Harbour North; Route 17A in Gaspereaux
- North end: Route 4 in Montague

Location
- Country: Canada
- Province: Prince Edward Island
- Counties: Kings

Highway system
- Provincial highways in Prince Edward Island
← Route 16	→ Route 18

Route 17, known along some sections as Point Pleasant Road, is a 36.9-kilometre (22.9 mi), two-lane, uncontrolled-access, secondary highway in eastern Prince Edward Island. Its southern terminus is at Route 4 in Murray River and its northern terminus is at Route 4 in Montague. The route is entirely in Kings County.

== Route description ==
The route begins at its southern terminus and heads northeast to North Murray Harbour, where it takes a right turn. It then goes north through Gaspereaux before heading northwest to its northern terminus.

== Major intersections ==
County	Location	km	mi	Junction	Notes
Kings	Murray River	0.0	0.0	Route 4	
Kings	North Murray Harbour	8.5	5.3	Route 17A	
Kings	Gaspereaux	16.5	10.3	Route 324	
Kings	Gaspereaux	18.1	11.2	Route 347	
Kings	Gaspereaux	23.9	14.9	Route 17A	
Kings	Albion	24.9	15.5	Route 317	
Kings	Albion	28.3	17.6	Route 316	
Kings	Montague	35.9	22.3	Route 326	
Kings	Montague	36.9	22.9	Route 4	

== Route 17A ==
Route 17A
- Location: North Murray Harbour-Gaspereaux
- Length: 6.6 km (4.1 mi)

Route 17A, also known as Cambridge Road, is the suffixed route of Route 17. It is 6.6 kilometres (4.1 mi) long and runs between North Murray Harbour and Gaspereaux. The route intersects Route 324 and Route 318.
