= Lot 26, Prince Edward Island =

- Township
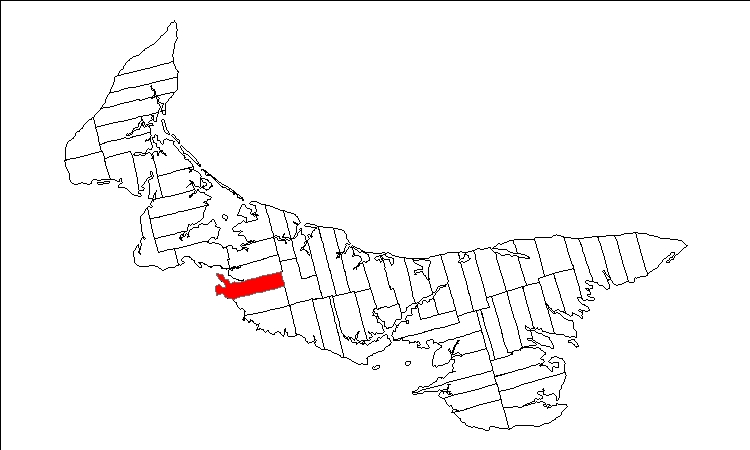
- Map of Prince Edward Island highlighting Lot 26
- Coordinates: 46°20′N 63°40′W
- Country: Canada
- Province: Prince Edward Island
- County: Prince County
- Parish: St. David's Parish.

Area
  - Total: 89.02 km^{2} (34.37 sq mi)

Population (2006)
  - Total: 942
  - Density: 10.6/km^{2} (27/sq mi)
- Time zone: UTC-4 (AST)
  - Summer (DST): UTC-3 (ADT)
- Canadian Postal code: C0A
- Area code: 902
- NTS Map: 011L05
- GNBC Code: BAERM

Lot 26 is a township in Prince County, Prince Edward Island, Canada. It is part of St. David's Parish. Lot 26 was awarded to Robert Stewart and Peter Gordon in the 1767 land lottery. One half was sold for arrears in quitrent in 1781 and one quarter was granted to Loyalists in 1783.

== Communities ==
Incorporated municipalities:

- Bedeque
- Central Bedeque

Civic address communities:

- Bedeque
- Central Bedeque
- Chelton
- Emerald
- Fernwood
- Freetown
- Lower Bedeque
- Lower Freetown
- Middleton
- Newton
- Searletown
- South Freetown

== Demographics ==
Historical population
| Year | Pop. | ±% |
|---|---|---|
| 1871 | 1,295 | — |
| 1881 | 1,346 | +3.9% |
| 1891 | 1,278 | −5.1% |
| 1901 | 1,202 | −5.9% |
| 1911 | 1,252 | +4.2% |
| 1921 | 1,278 | +2.1% |
| 1931 | 1,281 | +0.2% |
| 1941 | 1,348 | +5.2% |
| 2006 | 942 | −30.1% |
