= Prince Edward Island Route 18 =

Highway in Prince Edward Island, Canada

Route 18
- Cape Bear Road

Route information
- Maintained by the Department of Transportation, Infrastructure, and Energy
- Length: 23.9 km (14.9 mi)

Major junctions
- South end: Route 4 in High Bank
- Route 18A in Guernsey Cove; Route 18A in Murray Harbour
- North end: Route 4 in Murray River

Location
- Country: Canada
- Province: Prince Edward Island
- Counties: Kings

Highway system
- Provincial highways in Prince Edward Island
← Route 17	→ Route 19

Route 18, also known as Cape Bear Road, is a 23.9 kilometres (14.9 mi), two-lane, uncontrolled-access, secondary highway in eastern Prince Edward Island. Its southern terminus is at Route 4 in High Bank and its northern terminus is at Route 4 in Murray River. The route is entirely in Kings County.

== Route description ==
The route begins at its southern terminus and goes west to Guernsey Cove, where it turns right and continues northwest. The route turns left and then curves left in Beach Point to head southwest to a right turn in Murray Harbour. The route then goes west to its northern terminus.

== Route 18A ==
Route 18A
- Location: Guernsey Cove-Murray Harbour
- Length: 2.9 km (1.8 mi)

Route 18A, also known as Robertson Road, is the suffixed route of Route 18. It is 2.9 kilometres (1.8 mi) long and runs between Guernsey Cove and Murray Harbour. The route has no major intersections except for its terminuses with Route 18.
