= Prince Edward Island Route 5 =

Highway in Prince Edward Island, Canada

Route 5
- 48 Road
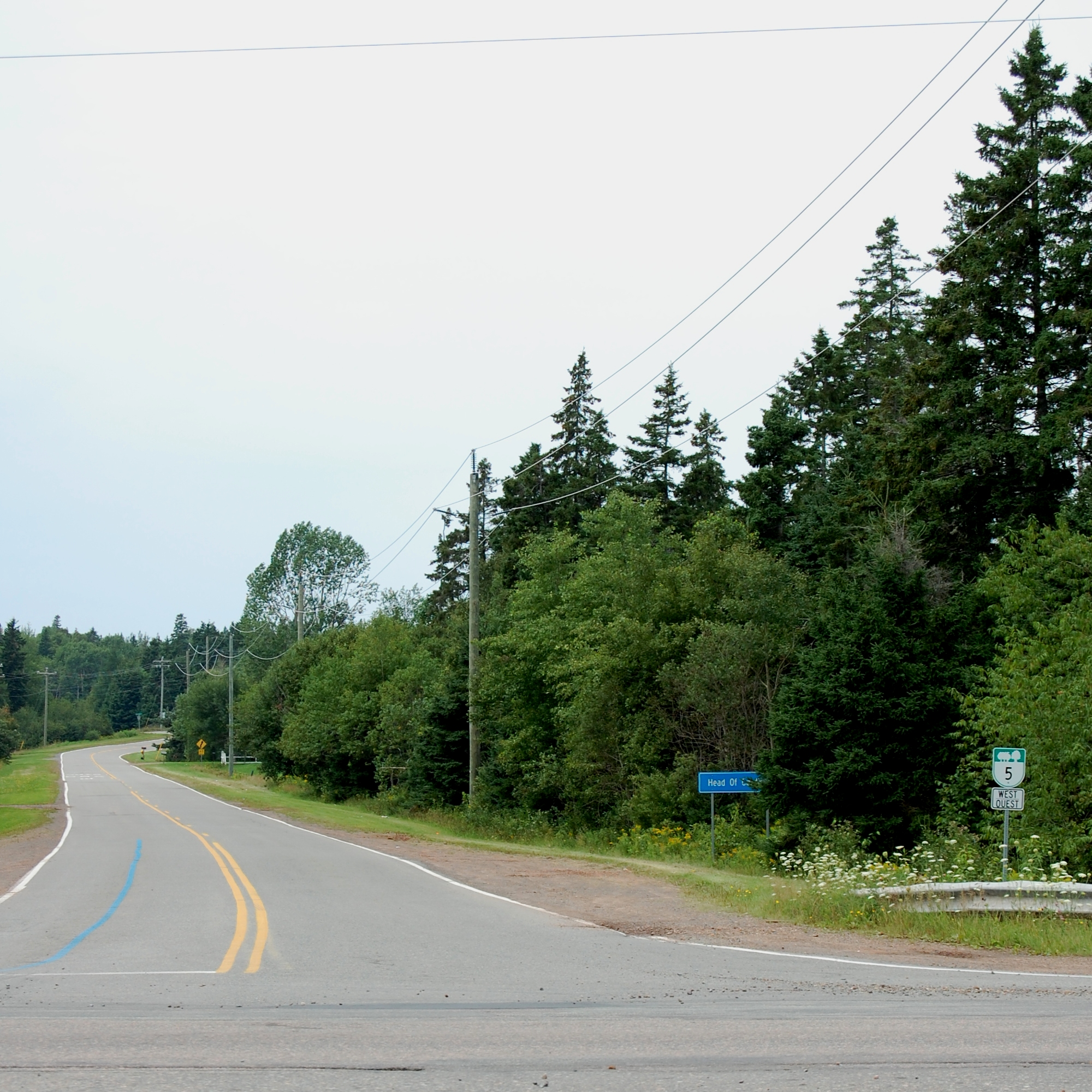

Route information
- Maintained by Prince Edward Island Transportation and Public Works
- Length: 27.8 km (17.3 mi)

Major junctions
- West end: Route 1 (TCH) at Mount Albion
- Route 213; Route 216; Route 320; Route 323; Route 22; Route 356
- East end: Route 4 near Cardigan

Location
- Country: Canada
- Province: Prince Edward Island
- Counties: Kings, Queens

Highway system
- Provincial highways in Prince Edward Island
← Route 4	→ Route 6

Prince Edward Island Route 5, known locally as 48 Road, is a highway in eastern Prince Edward Island.

Route 5 begins at the Trans Canada Highway, Prince Edward Island Highway 1 bearing east. It passes the junctions with Robertson Road and Klondike Road, arriving at Monaghan Road or Route 213 at km 7.5 (mi 4.7). Routes 5 and 213 form a concurrency for 0.3 kilometers (0.2 mi) in a southward direction. Junction Route 216, Avondale Road is at km 12.0 (mi 7.5). Route 5 passes the junction with Gauls Road, Fariville Road, till the junction with Route 213, Brothers Road at km 16.4 (mi 10.2), within Kings County. At km 18.5 (mi 11.5), Route 5 meets with the intersection of Route 323, Curran Road. At km 18.5 (mi 11.5), Route 5 makes the intersection with Route 22. Route 5 continues west meeting Old Mt. Stewart Road and Route 356 at a 5 corners intersection. Route 5 continues in a south east direction passing Johnston Road, and Straghbohgle Road before ending at km 27.8 (mi 17.3), Route 4.

== See also ==
- List of Prince Edward Island provincial highways
