= Grand Tracadie =

Grand Tracadie may refer to:

- Grand Tracadie, Prince Edward Island, a community in Prince Edward Island, Canada
- Regional Municipality of Grand Tracadie–Sheila, a regional municipality in New Brunswick, Canada
