= Prince Edward Island Route 23 =

Highway in Prince Edward Island, Canada

Route 23
- Selkirk Road

Route information
- Maintained by the Department of Transportation, Infrastructure, and Energy
- Length: 18.8 km (11.7 mi)

Major junctions
- South end: Route 315 in Wood Islands
- Route 202 in Wood Islands; Route 203 in Culloden; Route 204 in Lewes; Route 205 in Ocean View; Route 206 in Iona; Route 211 in Newtown Cross
- North end: Route 210 in Orwell

Location
- Country: Canada
- Province: Prince Edward Island
- Counties: Queens

Highway system
- Provincial highways in Prince Edward Island
← Route 22	→ Route 24

Route 23, also known as Selkirk Road, is a 18.8-kilometre (11.7 mi), two-lane, uncontrolled-access, secondary highway in central Prince Edward Island. Its southern terminus is at Route 315 in Wood Islands and its northern terminus is at Route 210 in Orwell. The route is entirely in Queens County and it is generally a straight line between its termini.
