= Prince Edward Island Route 21 =

Highway in Prince Edward Island, Canada

Route 21
- Bunbury Road; Fort Augustus Road

Route information
- Maintained by the Department of Transportation, Infrastructure, and Energy
- Length: 30.9 km (19.2 mi)

Major junctions
- West end: Route 1 (TCH) in Southport
- Route 215 in Mermaid; Route 257 in Mermaid; Route 215 in Glenfinnan; Route 213 in Augustus; Route 214 in Pisquid West; Route 22 in Maple Hill
- East end: Route 323 in Fanning Brook

Location
- Country: Canada
- Province: Prince Edward Island
- Counties: Queens, Kings

Highway system
- Provincial highways in Prince Edward Island
← Route 20	→ Route 22

Route 21, also known as Bunbury Road and Fort Augustus Road, is a 30.9 km (19.2 mi), two-lane, uncontrolled-access, secondary highway in central Prince Edward Island. Its western terminus is at Route 1 in Southport and its eastern terminus is at Route 323 in Fanning Brook. The route is in Queens and Kings counties.

== Route description ==
The route begins in Stratford at an intersection with Route 1, heading east as Hopeton Road. The route continues east as Bunbury Road and crosses Fullerton Creek, leading to a roundabout with Route 215. The route proceeds north from the roundabout as Fort Augustus Road before turning to the east again at Mermaid. The route then crosses several more rivers, including the Pisquid River, and intersects Route 22 (Mount Stewart Road) at Pisquid. The route continues eastward as an unpaved rural road, ending at Route 323 (Saint Patrick's Road).
