= Prince Edward Island Route 22 =

Highway in Prince Edward Island, Canada

Route 22

Route information
- Maintained by the Department of Transportation, Infrastructure, and Energy
- Length: 28.6 km (17.8 mi)

Major junctions
- South end: Route 210 / Route 320 in Montague
- Route 3 in New Perth; Route 5 in 48 Road; Route 323 in Saint Theresa; Route 320 in Saint Theresa; Route 21 in Maple Hill; Route 351 in Mount Stewart
- North end: Route 2 in Mount Stewart

Location
- Country: Canada
- Province: Prince Edward Island
- Counties: Kings, Queens

Highway system
- Provincial highways in Prince Edward Island
← Route 21	→ Route 23

Route 22 is a 28.6 km (17.8 mi), two-lane, uncontrolled-access, secondary highway in eastern Prince Edward Island. Its southern terminus is at Route 210 and Route 320 in Montague and its northern terminus is at Route 2 in Mount Stewart. The route is in Kings and Queens counties.

== Route description ==
The route begins at its southern terminus and goes north to Saint Theresa where it curves to go towards the northwest. It reaches Mount Stewart, crosses the Hillsborough River, and ends at its northern terminus.
