= Bedeque and Area =

- Community
- Municipality of Bedeque and Area
- Bedeque and Area in Prince Edward Island
- Coordinates: 46.339°N 63.714°W
- Country: Canada
- Province: Prince Edward Island
- County: Prince County
- Parish: St David's
- Lot: Lot 26
- Incorporated: November 17, 2014

Government
  - Mayor: Matthew Bowness
  - Deputy Mayor: Karen Ashley-Neill
  - CAO: Kevin McKenna
  - Councillors: Rob Green; Barry Stewart; Savannah Perkins-Berniquez; Derrick Blacquiere; Andrew David

Area
  - Total: 2.26 km^{2} (0.87 sq mi)

Population (2021)
  - Total: 311
  - Density: 137.5/km^{2} (356/sq mi)
- Time zone: AST
  - Summer (DST): ADT
- Canadian postal code: C0B 1G0
- Area code: 902
- Telephone Exchange: 887

Bedeque and Area (/bəˈdɛk/) is a municipality that holds community status in Prince Edward Island, Canada. It was formed through the amalgamation of the communities of Bedeque and Central Bedeque on November 17, 2014.

== Demographics ==
Federal census population history of Bedeque and Area
Year	Pop.	±%
2011	310	—
2016	302	−2.6%
2021	311	+3.0%
Source: Statistics Canada

In the 2021 Census of Population conducted by Statistics Canada, Bedeque and Area had a population of 311 living in 123 of its 132 total private dwellings, a change of 3% from its 2016 population of 302. With a land area of 2.26 km^{2} (0.87 sq mi), it had a population density of 137.6/km^{2} (356.4/sq mi) in 2021.

== See also ==
- List of communities in Prince Edward Island
