= Mark Bonnell =

Canadian politician

Mark H. Bonnell

Councillor for 4th Kings
- In office 1922–1923
- Preceded by: William G. Sutherland
- Succeeded by: Albert Prowse

Personal details
- Born: June 7, 1860 Lamaline, Newfoundland
- Died: March 22, 1945 (aged 84)
- Party: Liberal

Mark H. Bonnell (June 7, 1860 – March 22, 1945) was a Canadian politician, who represented the electoral district of 4th Kings in the Legislative Assembly of Prince Edward Island from 1922 to 1923. He was a member of the Prince Edward Island Liberal Party.

Originally from Lamaline, Newfoundland, Bonnell was a sea captain and farmer. He was elected to the legislature in a by-election in 1922 following the death in office of William G. Sutherland, but was defeated in the 1923 election.

Two of his grandsons, Lorne Bonnell and John Bonnell, also represented the same electoral district between 1951 and 1974; Lorne Bonnell also served in the Senate of Canada.
