= Pleasant Grove, Prince Edward Island =

Pleasant Grove
- Community
- Municipality of Pleasant Grove
- Pleasant Grove in Prince Edward Island
- Coordinates: 46.363°N 63.077°W
- Country: Canada
- Province: Prince Edward Island
- County: Queens County
- Incorporated: 1980

Population (2011)
  - Total: 496
- Time zone: AST
  - Summer (DST): ADT
- Area code: 902
- Telephone Exchange: 887

Pleasant Grove was a municipality that held community status in Prince Edward Island, Canada. It was incorporated in 1980. On September 28, 2018, it was merged into the municipality of North Shore.

== See also ==
- List of communities in Prince Edward Island
