= Joseph Thomas Roche =

Rev. Joseph Thomas Roche
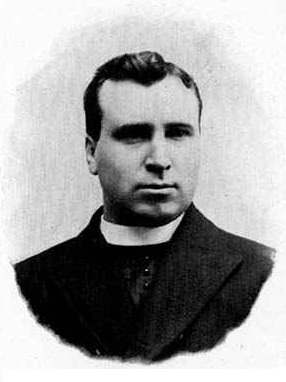

Orders
- Ordination: December 17, 1892

Personal details
- Born: January 3, 1865 Iona, Prince Edward Island

Rev. Joseph Thomas Roche was an author and a Roman Catholic priest.

== Early life ==
Roche was born in Iona, Prince Edward Island, Canada on January 3, 1865. He was the son of Michael Roche and Hannah Murphy. He attended Prince of Wales College and Ottawa University (Degree of LL.D., 1907). His theological studies were made at St. Mary's Seminary, Emmitsburg, Maryland.

One of the founders of the Catholic Church Extension Society of the United States and was elected the first vice-president on October 16, 1905.

He was Editor of the Catholic Register and Extension in Toronto, Ontario, Canada.

== Books Written by Rev. Joseph Thomas Roche ==
- Our Lady of Guadalupe (1902)
- The Ought to be's (1906)
- St. Anthony of Padua (1907)
- The Business Side of Religion (1908)
- The Obligation of Hearing Mass on Sundays and Holy Days (1910)
- Masses for the Dead (1911)
- Around the World (1912)
