= Augustine Cove =

Locality in Prince Edward Island, Canada

Coordinates: 46°13′30″N 63°36′29″W

- unincorporated area
- Interactive map of Augustine Cove
- Federal riding: Malpeque
- Provincial riding: Borden-Kinkora

Augustine Cove is an unincorporated area in Prince County, Prince Edward Island, Canada. The community is located on Prince Edward Island Route 10.

== Politics ==
Augustine Cove is part of the Malpeque riding for elections to the House of Commons of Canada.

Location of Augustine Cove within PEI

== Notable people ==
- Matt MacFarlane, politician
