= Prince Edward Island Route 26 =

Highway in Prince Edward Island

Route 26
- Georgetown Road; Pownal Road

Route information
- Maintained by the Department of Transportation, Infrastructure, and Energy
- Length: 11.3 km (7.0 mi)

Major junctions
- West end: Route 1 (TCH) in Stratford
- East end: Route 1 (TCH) in Waterside

Location
- Country: Canada
- Province: Prince Edward Island
- Counties: Queens

Highway system
- Provincial highways in Prince Edward Island
← Route 25A	→ Route 27

Route 26, also known as Georgetown Road and Pownal Road, is an 11.3-kilometre (7.0 mi), two-lane, uncontrolled-access, secondary highway in central Prince Edward Island. The route is entirely in Queens County.

== Route description ==
The route begins in the town of Stratford at a roundabout with Route 1. The road leads south to the community of Tea Hill, where it curves to the east. Traveling alongside the Northumberland Strait, the route passes Alexandria and Pownal before ending at Route 1 in Waterside.
