= Lorne Bonnell =

Canadian politician

The Honourable Lorne Bonnell

Senator for Murray River, Prince Edward Island
- In office November 4, 1971 – January 4, 1998
- Appointed by: Pierre Trudeau

MLA (Assemblyman) for 4th Kings
- In office April 26, 1951 – November 15, 1971
- Preceded by: Daniel MacRae
- Succeeded by: John Bonnell

Personal details
- Born: Mark Lorne Bonnell; January 4, 1923 Hopefield, Prince Edward Island
- Died: October 9, 2006 (aged 83) Charlottetown, Prince Edward Island
- Party: Liberal

Mark Lorne Bonnell (January 4, 1923 – October 9, 2006) was a Canadian physician, provincial politician and senator.

Born in Hopefield, Prince Edward Island, the son of Lottie and Harry Bonnell, he received his Doctor of Medicine from Dalhousie University in 1949. He practiced medicine in Murray River.

In 1951, he was elected to the Legislative Assembly of Prince Edward Island representing the district of 4th Kings. A member of the Prince Edward Island Liberal Party, he was re-elected in 1955, 1959, 1962, 1966, and 1970. He was the Minister of Health, Minister of Welfare, Minister Tourist Development, and Minister Responsible for Housing. His grandfather, Mark Bonnell, was also a member of the Legislative Assembly of Prince Edward Island.

In 1971, he was appointed to the senate representing the senatorial division of Murray River, Prince Edward Island. A Liberal, he retired at the mandatory age of 75 in 1998. His brother John Bonnell succeeded him in a by-election as MLA for 4th Kings.

In 2001, he was awarded an honorary degree from the University of Prince Edward Island.

He died at the Queen Elizabeth Hospital in Charlottetown on October 9, 2006.
