= Hampton, Prince Edward Island =

Canadian rural community

Coordinates: 46.217°N 63.467°W

Location of Hampton in Prince Edward Island

Hampton is a small Canadian rural community located in southwestern Queens County, Prince Edward Island.

Situated immediately east of Crapaud in the township of Lot 29, Hampton functions as a small highway service centre.

The area was named in 1865 by Mrs. James MacPhail, who came from New Brunswick, possibly Hampton in Kings County. The community had its own post office between 1875 and 1968. It was established as a civic address community in 2000.

Notable documented family histories include that of the Myers family and Ferguson family.

In 2002, Peter Bevan-Baker, who later became the Leader of the Official Opposition, settled in Hampton after moving from Scotland via Ontario.

“Ellen’s Diary, by an Island Farmer’s Wife” was a regular column written by Margaret MacQuarrie Dixon that was featured in The Guardian newspaper from 1945 to 1963. Margaret also later detailed her childhood on a farm in Hampton, PEI, and her first years as a school teacher in “Going Home” (Willams & Crue, Summerside PEI, 1979).

In 1907, a siting of “Hampton’s Phantom Ship” was reported by two residents of Charlottetown. This siting is embedded in a larger story of the Ghost Ship of Northumberland Strait.

== Businesses ==
- A Kennedy & Co. Ltd.
- Beachside Bed & Breakfast
- Blue Spruces Cottages
- Coastal Escape PEI
- Hampton Haven Cottages
- Hampton Irving Service Station
- Island Sun Cottages
- Island Sun Kennels
- McLure's Cottage By The Sea
- Summer Zephyr
- Redcliffe Beach House

== Maps ==
- Map of Hampton [ Hampton is located between Victoria and Desable]
