= Emyvale, Prince Edward Island =

Coordinates: 46°16′37″N 63°21′53″W

Emyvale, Prince Edward Island is an unincorporated community in Queens County, Prince Edward Island, Canada north east of Crapaud.
