= Prince Edward Island Route 19 =

Highway in Prince Edward Island, Canada

Route 19

Route information
- Maintained by Prince Edward Island Department of Transportation and Infrastructure Renewal
- Length: 44.5 km (27.7 mi)

Major junctions
- West end: Route 1 (TCH) in DeSable
- Route 19A at New Dominion and Canoe Cove
- East end: Route 27 in Cornwall

Location
- Country: Canada
- Province: Prince Edward Island
- Counties: Queens

Highway system
- Provincial highways in Prince Edward Island
← Route 18	→ Route 20

Route 19 is a secondary highway, that runs along the shoreline of the Northumberland Strait in Queens County, Prince Edward Island, Canada. There are two lanes, one going in either direction. The highway begins in the community of Desable and ends in the town of Cornwall via Rocky Point.

== Points of interest ==
- Argyle Shore Provincial Park
- Port La-Joye / Fort Amherst, National Historic Site

== Route 19A ==
Route 19A
- Location: Canoe Cove−New Dominion
- Length: 6.6 km (4.1 mi)

Route 19A (also known as Canoe Cove Road and Long Creek Road) is a secondary provincial highway located in Queens County, Prince Edward Island, Canada. The highway begins in Canoe Cove as a more direct route towards Cornwall, as Route 19 veers off towards Rocky Point. Route 19A meets up with route 19 again just before crossing the West River into Meadowbank.
