= North Shore, Prince Edward Island =

North Shore
- Rural municipality
- Municipality of North Shore
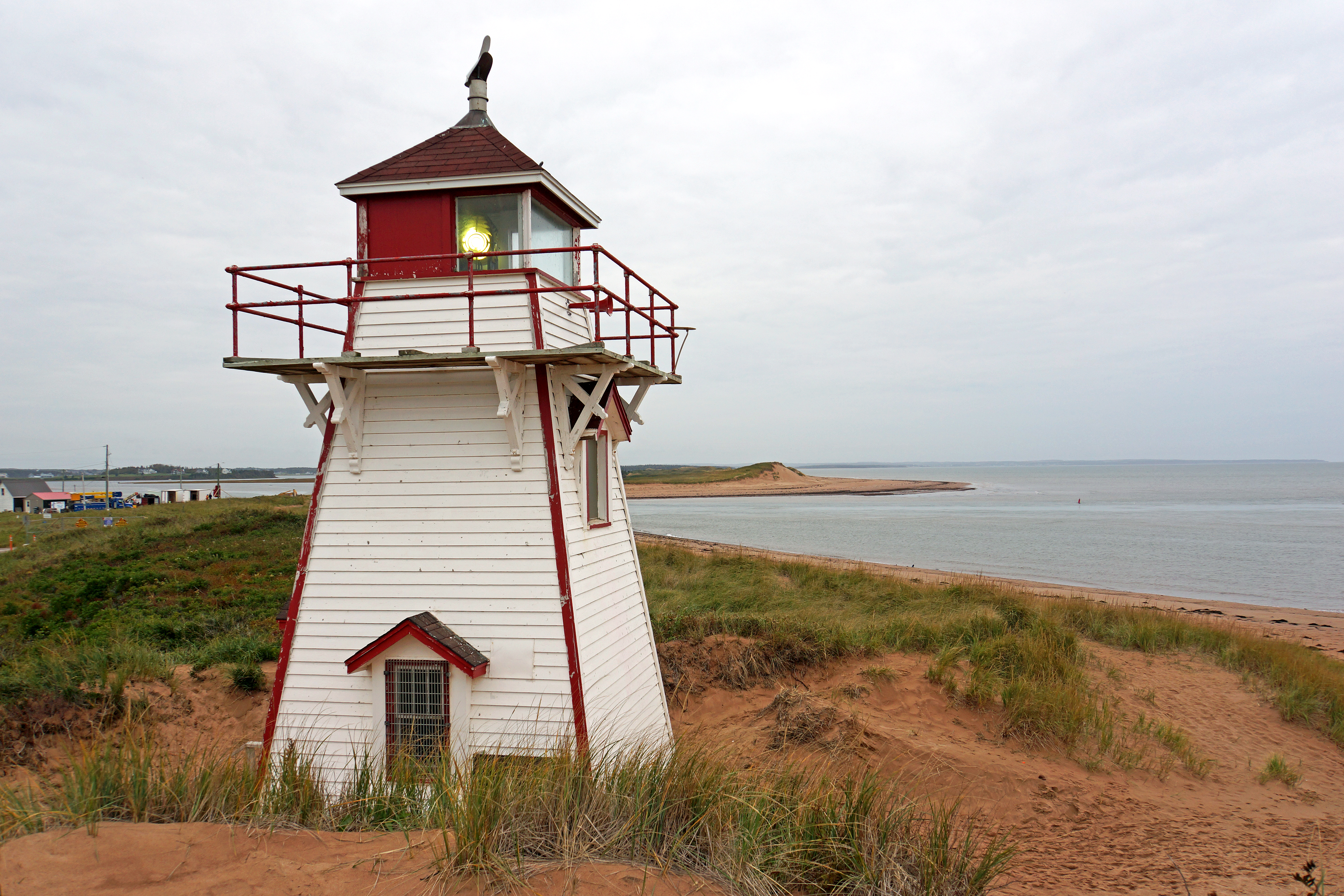
- Covehead Harbour Lighthouse

- North Shore in Prince Edward Island
- Coordinates: 46.376°N 63.008°W
- Country: Canada
- Province: Prince Edward Island
- County: Queens County
- Lot: Lot 34
- Incorporated: 1974
- Amalgamated: September 28, 2018
- Time zone: AST
  - Summer (DST): ADT
- Area code: 902
- Website: Official website

North Shore is a rural municipality within Queens County in Prince Edward Island that was incorporated on September 28, 2018, through an amalgamation of three municipalities. The municipalities that amalgamated were the rural municipalities of Grand Tracadie, North Shore, and Pleasant Grove.

== History ==
The original Rural Municipality of North Shore was incorporated in 1974.

== Communities ==
- Covehead
- Covehead Road
- Grand Tracadie
- Pleasant Grove
- Stanhope
- West Covehead

== Demographics ==
Federal census population history of North Shore
Year	Pop.	±%
2016	2,152	—
2021	2,500	+16.2%
Source: Statistics Canada

In the 2021 Census of Population conducted by Statistics Canada, North Shore had a population of 2,500 living in 981 of its 1,358 total private dwellings, a change of 16.2% from its 2016 population of 2,152. With a land area of 71.13 km^{2} (27.46 sq mi), it had a population density of 35.1/km^{2} (91.0/sq mi) in 2021.

Name	Former municipal status	Original incorporation year	2016 Census of Population				
Name	Former municipal status	Original incorporation year	Population (2016)	Population (2011)	Change	Land area (km^{2})	Population density
Grand Tracadie	Rural municipality	1984	294	293	+0.3%	12.2	24.1/km^{2}
North Shore	Rural municipality	1974	1,294	1,112	+16.4%	45.4	28.5/km^{2}
Pleasant Grove	Rural municipality	1980	492	496	−0.8%	13.6	36.2/km^{2}
Total former municipalities	–	–	2,080	1,901	+9.4%	71.4	29.1/km^{2}

== Government ==
The Rural Municipality of North Shore was first governed by an interim council comprising an interim mayor (Gordon Ellis) and fifteen interim councillors. The first election for a mayor and six councillors (one for each of six wards) was on November 5, 2018. resulting in the election of a Mayor (Gerard Watts) and six councillors.

North Shore federal election results
Year	Liberal		Conservative		New Democratic		Green	
2021	48%	771	30%	494	8%	131	12%	187
2019	46%	691	24%	366	7%	104	23%	354

North Shore provincial election results
Year	PC		Liberal		Green	
2019	35%	470	41%	551	23%	306
2015	25%	304	59%	717	8%	94
