= York Point, Prince Edward Island =

Coordinates: 46°12′51.4″N 63°9′49.3″W

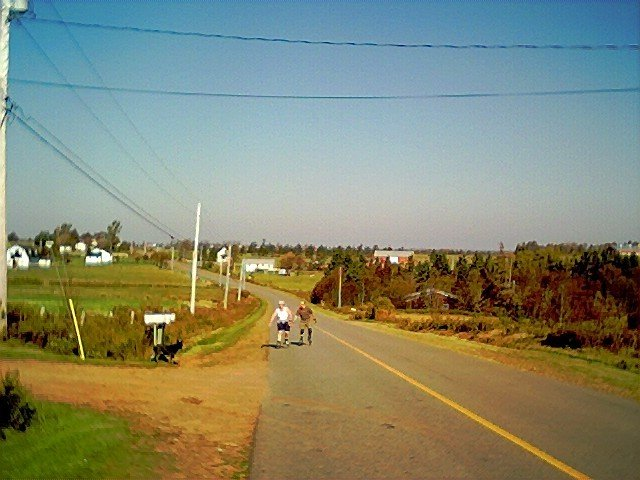
York Point Road, 2003

York Point is an unincorporated Canadian community in Queens County, Prince Edward Island.

In 1996 it was amalgamated into the town of Cornwall.

The community is centred on the York Point Road, which runs to North Point, a point of land formed by tidal inlets of the North (Yorke) River and the West (Elliot) River on the western side of Charlottetown Harbour.
