= Corraville, Prince Edward Island =

Unincorporated community in Canada

Coordinates: 46.20°N 62.50°W

Corraville is an unincorporated community in Prince Edward Island, Canada. The community is in Kings County in the eastern part of the Province, SW. of St. Peters.

Location of Corraville
