= Central Bedeque =

- Former community
- Central Bedeque in Prince Edward Island
- Coordinates: 46.340°N 63.703°W
- Country: Canada
- Province: Prince Edward Island
- County: Prince County
- Parish: St David's
- Lot: Lot 26
- Adopted: 1925
- Recognized: 1944
- Incorporated: 1966
- Amalgamated: November 17, 2014

Population (2001)
  - Total: 186
- Time zone: AST
  - Summer (DST): ADT
- Canadian postal code: C0B 1G0
- Area code: 902
- Telephone Exchange: 887
- NTS Map: 11L5 Summerside
- GNBC Code: BAECM

Central Bedeque is a former municipality that previously held community status in the Canadian province of Prince Edward Island. It was dissolved through its amalgamation with the Community of Bedeque on November 17, 2014, to create the Community of Bedeque and Area. It is located north of Borden-Carleton within Lot 26, Prince County. Its primary industry is agriculture.

== History ==
The name, Central Bedeque, was first adopted in 1925, and was confirmed in 1944. It was established as a village in 1966. Its former names were the Strong's Corner, and the Weatherbie's Corner until the name was changed to Central Bedeque when it was incorporated.

Federal census population history of Central Bedeque
Year	Pop.	±%
1971	213	—
1976	193	−9.4%
1981	185	−4.1%
1986	199	+7.6%
1991	181	−9.0%
1996	182	+0.6%
2001	186	+2.2%
2006	149	−19.9%
2011	167	+12.1%
2016	159	−4.8%
Source: Statistics Canada

== Geography ==
Central Bedeque is located northwest of Borden-Carleton in the central part of the province on the south shore (fronting the Northumberland Strait), and is on the Dunk River.

Central Bedeque traces its name to neighbouring Bedeque (which it also shares with neighbouring North Bedeque and Lower Bedeque). The name "Bedeque" may be a corruption of a term used by the Mi'kmaq Nation with several meanings such as "sunny camping place" or "the hot place".
