= Morell, Prince Edward Island =

Morell
- Rural municipality
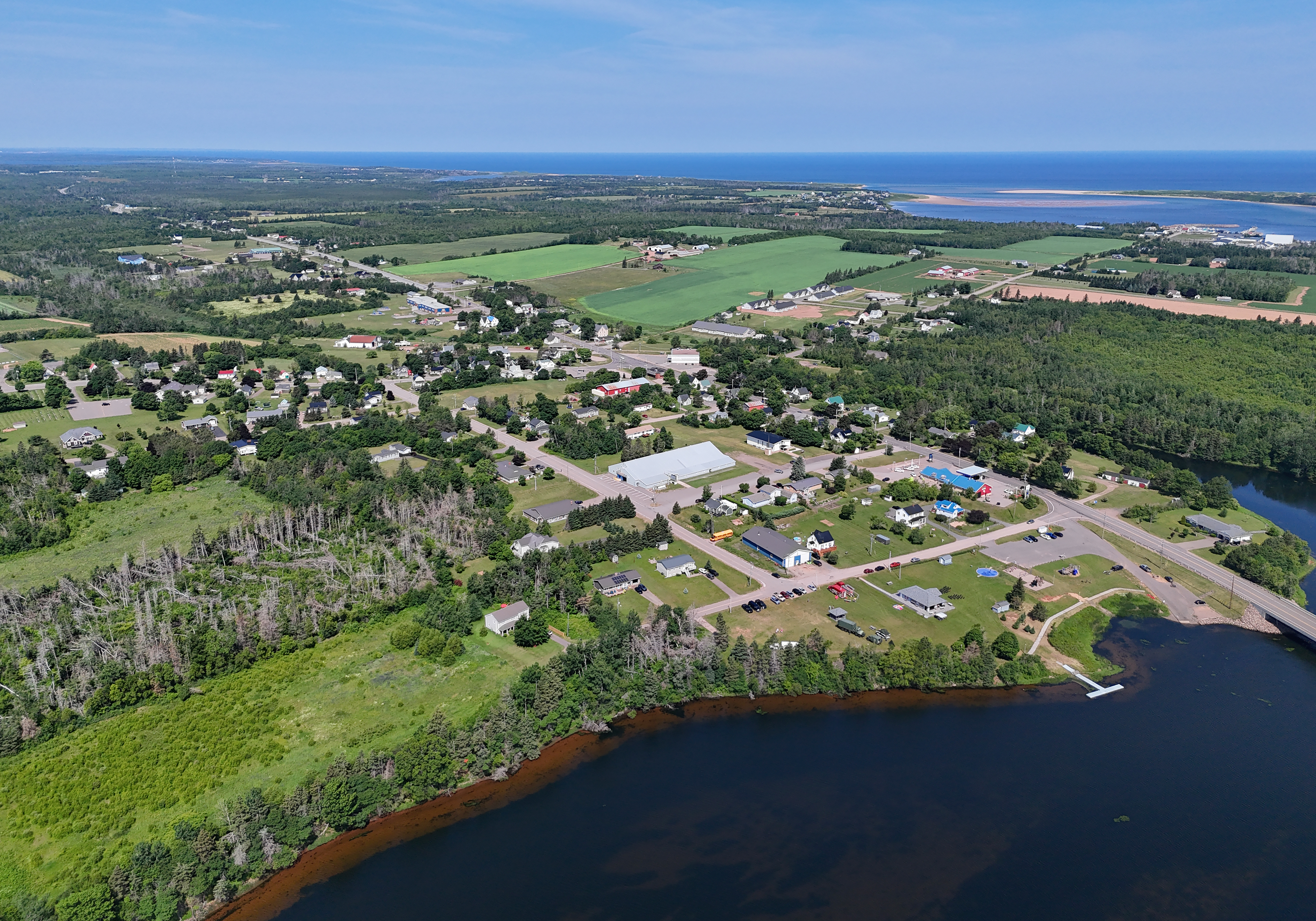

- Morell in Prince Edward Island
- Coordinates: 46.416°N 62.706°W
- Country: Canada
- Province: Prince Edward Island
- County: Kings County

Government
  - Mayor: Danny Kelly
  - CAO: Dianne Burland

Area
  - Land: 1.52 km^{2} (0.59 sq mi)

Population
  - Total: 316
- Time zone: AST
  - Summer (DST): ADT
- Area code: 902

Morell is a rural municipality in Prince Edward Island, Canada. It is located in Kings County east of Bristol.

Morell is located on St. Peter's Bay, two kilometres inland from St. Peter's Bay, a sub-basin of the Gulf of St. Lawrence. The local economy is centred on farming (wild blueberry farms), fishing (Lobster), aquaculture (Mussels), and tourism. It was incorporated in 1953.

Most of the area residents are of Scottish, English, Irish, or French descent. The first inhabitants of the community of Morell were Maritime Archaic Indians followed by the Mi'kmaq Nation. The Morell River was known to the Mi'kmaq as Pogooseemkekseboo, meaning "clam ground river".

The community was named for Jean Francois Morel who settled in the area in 1720-21, having arrived from Saint-Malo, France. Local attractions include the nearby Rodd Crowbush Golf & Beach Resort.

== Demographics ==
Federal census population history of Morell
Year	Pop.	±%
1956	309	—
1961	387	+25.2%
1966	393	+1.6%
1971	387	−1.5%
1976	350	−9.6%
1981	347	−0.9%
1986	359	+3.5%
1991	349	−2.8%
1996	336	−3.7%
2001	332	−1.2%
2006	306	−7.8%
2011	313	+2.3%
2016	297	−5.1%
2021	269	−9.4%
Source: Statistics Canada

In the 2021 Census of Population conducted by Statistics Canada, Morell had a population of 269 living in 119 of its 131 total private dwellings, a change of −9.4% from its 2016 population of 297. With a land area of 1.49 km^{2} (0.58 sq mi), it had a population density of 180.5/km^{2} (467.6/sq mi) in 2021.
