= Culloden, Prince Edward Island =

Settlement in Prince Edward Island, Canada

Coordinates: 46.0166°N 62.78333°W

Location of Culloden in Prince Edward Island

Culloden is a settlement in southeastern Queens County, Prince Edward Island.

Named in honour of Culloden Moor, Inverness-shire, Scotland, the location of the Battle of Culloden. A post office was opened in the community in 1906.
