= Grand Tracadie, Prince Edward Island =

Grand Tracadie
- Community
- Municipality of Grand Tracadie
- Grand Tracadie in Prince Edward Island
- Coordinates: 46.393°N 63.053°W
- Country: Canada
- Province: Prince Edward Island
- County: Queens County
- Incorporated: 1984

Population (2011)
  - Total: 293
- Time zone: AST
  - Summer (DST): ADT
- Area code: 902
- Telephone Exchange: 887

Grand Tracadie was a municipality that holds community status in Prince Edward Island, Canada. It was incorporated in 1984. The village itself was located in the central portion of Prince Edward Island. On September 28, 2018, it was merged with the municipality of North Shore. Grand Tracadie finds itself partly in a National Park of Canada. It is close to Charlottetown, the cultural hub of P.E.I.

== Hotel Acadia and Acadia Spring ==
The Hotel Acadia was a well known beach and wellness resort that operated for 12 seasons. The hotel opened its doors in the spring of 1894. This establishment contributed toward Tracadie Beach being known as a health resort for those "run down" by overwork and strain.

The hotel burned down on August 6, 1906.

The Hotel was known for its excellent Acadian cuisine. This popular cuisine consisted of many fresh fish including: mackerel, codfish, haddock, lobster, clams, salmon, trout and other sea and harbour fish. The use of local meats, fruits and vegetables laid the ground work for what was to become known as folk food.

== See also ==
- List of communities in Prince Edward Island
