= Iona, Prince Edward Island =

Coordinates: 46.098°N 62.804°W

Location of Iona in Prince Edward Island

Iona is a settlement in southern Queens County, Prince Edward Island.

== Notable people ==
- Joseph Thomas Roche (1892–after 1912), author and a Roman Catholic priest
