= Uigg, Prince Edward Island =

Location of Uigg in Prince Edward Island

Uigg is a settlement in Prince Edward Island.
