= Warren Grove =

- Community
- Municipality of Warren Grove
- Warren Grove in Prince Edward Island
- Coordinates: 46.278°N 63.219°W
- Country: Canada
- Province: Prince Edward Island
- County: Queens County
- Incorporated: 1985

Area
  - Land: 10.18 km^{2} (3.93 sq mi)

Population (2021)
  - Total: 374
  - Density: 35/km^{2} (91/sq mi)
- Time zone: AST
  - Summer (DST): ADT
- Area code: 902

Warren Grove is a municipality that holds community status in Prince Edward Island, Canada. It was incorporated in 1985.

== Demographics ==
Federal census population history of Warren Grove
Year	Pop.	±%
1986	289	—
1991	296	+2.4%
1996	295	−0.3%
2001	332	+12.5%
2006	341	+2.7%
2011	367	+7.6%
2016	356	−3.0%
2021	374	+5.1%
Source: Statistics Canada

In the 2021 Canadian census conducted by Statistics Canada, Warren Grove had a population of 374 living in 137 of its 141 total private dwellings, a change of 5.1% from its population reported in the 2016 Canadian census of 356. With a land area of 10.16 km^{2} (3.92 sq mi), it had a population density of 36.8/km^{2} (95.3/sq mi) in 2021.

== See also ==
- List of communities in Prince Edward Island
