= Albany, Prince Edward Island =

Coordinates: 46.286°N 63.661°W

Location of Albany within PEI

Albany is a Canadian settlement in Prince County, Prince Edward Island. An unincorporated area, it observes Atlantic Standard Time (AST). Like most of the island and parts of Nova Scotia and Prince Edward Island it falls under the 902 area code. The postal codes starting with C0B address most if not all of Albany.

== Local Business ==
Albany features a number of farmers and small businesses, such as a local community center with a small bar. The local Club formerly the Albany Lions Club is run by a group of volunteers and opens weekly on Friday nights only. The club is also rented out regularly for private events. There is also a postal office.
