= Miltonvale Park =

- Community
- Municipality of Miltonvale Park
- Miltonvale Park in Prince Edward Island
- Coordinates: 46.318°N 63.237°W
- Country: Canada
- Province: Prince Edward Island
- County: Queens County
- Incorporated: 1974

Population (2021)
  - Total: 1,191
- Time zone: AST
  - Summer (DST): ADT
- Area code: 902

Miltonvale Park is a municipality that holds community status in Prince Edward Island, Canada. It was incorporated in 1974.

== Demographics ==
Federal census population history of Miltonvale Park
Year	Pop.	±%
1981	941	—
1986	1,080	+14.8%
1991	1,106	+2.4%
1996	1,242	+12.3%
2001	1,185	−4.6%
2006	1,163	−1.9%
2011	1,153	−0.9%
2016	1,148	−0.4%
2021	1,196	+4.2%
Source: Statistics Canada

In the 2021 Census of Population conducted by Statistics Canada, Miltonvale Park had a population of 1,196 living in 484 of its 501 total private dwellings, a change of 3.3% from its 2016 population of 1,158. With a land area of 35.13 km^{2} (13.56 sq mi), it had a population density of 34.0/km^{2} (88.2/sq mi) in 2021.

== See also ==
- List of communities in Prince Edward Island
