= Clyde River, Prince Edward Island =

Clyde River
- Rural municipality
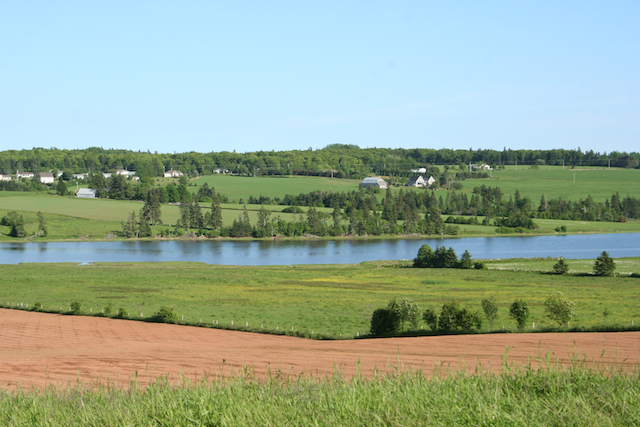
- Clyde River

- Clyde River in Prince Edward Island
- Coordinates: 46.224°N 63.255°W
- Country: Canada
- Province: Prince Edward Island
- County: Queens County
- Time zone: AST
  - Summer (DST): ADT
- Area code: 902

Clyde River is a rural municipality in Prince Edward Island, Canada. Clyde River is located in Queens County in the central part of Prince Edward Island and just 15 minutes away from Charlottetown. The original community name was Dog River (changed to Clyde River sometime around 1864). It was named after the River Clyde in Scotland. Heritage is predominantly Scottish and English.

== Demographics ==
Federal census population history of Clyde River
Year	Pop.	±%
1981	490	—
1986	523	+6.7%
1991	554	+5.9%
1996	601	+8.5%
2001	581	−3.3%
2006	618	+6.4%
2011	576	−6.8%
2016	653	+13.4%
2021	614	−6.0%
Source: Statistics Canada

In the 2021 Census of Population conducted by Statistics Canada, Clyde River had a population of 614 living in 252 of its 271 total private dwellings, a change of −6% from its 2016 population of 653. With a land area of 15.93 km^{2} (6.15 sq mi), it had a population density of 38.5/km^{2} (99.8/sq mi) in 2021.

== Attractions ==
Clyde River Presbyterian Church

The land for the church was purchased in 1856 by Angus MacFadyen with the construction of the church starting shortly after. The church was first opened by Rev. James Allen. In 1870 the congregation experienced remarkable growth with in the church therefore a section was added onto the church to sit the growing congregation. In the early days of the church Burnside Presbyterian was a part of the New London congregation. Over the years the church has been a part of the Queen's Square congregation, West River and Brookfield congregation. Then in 1938 Nine Mile Creek, Canoe Cove and Churchill united with Clyde River to form the Central Parish charge. In 2009 the Central Parish consists of Clyde River and Canoe Cove with Churchill being a memorial church in the parish. Today there is worship service every Sunday at 11:00 am and Sunday School for children.

Stone House

The Stone House was built from Island sandstone in 1842, located adjacent to the Trans Canada High Way in Clyde River, PEI. In 1843, the property was purchased by Ambrose Lane and the house was used as hunting lodge. After the passing of the owner in 1853, the house had various owners. In the 1970s the house was purchase by the Atwell family. Now the Stone House is referred to as the Atwell House. The house is one of eight remaining sandstone homes that were constructed in the 1800s. The house is unique because if the 21 inch cavity walls, the size and placement of the windows and doors, the Island sandstone construction, the interior arrangement of rooms and the dormer of the front elevation.

Clyde River Pioneer Cemetery

The cemetery is located on the bank of the Clyde River approximately half of a kilometre from the Clyde River Road. The cemetery is respected because of its historical association with the early Scottish pioneers to the surrounding area and for the association of the history to the Baptist faith. The site is enclosed by a fence and trees. To date there is approximately 19 gravestones that are on the site. The families laid to rest at the Cemetery include: Harvey, Henderson, Livingston, Maclean, Murray and Wares. The first burial took place in 1842 and the last took place in 1908. The community of Clyde River has worked hard to maintain the up keeping of the site. In 1995 a sign was installed indicating the cemetery.

Livingston House

The Livingston House was built on the Clyde River Road in 1840. Until the mid 1900s the house was home to three generations. At the time the house had eight bedroom. In 1999 Wanda Livingston and her husband Eric MacPhail undertook significant renovations to the house earning them the PEI Museum and Heritage Foundation awards in 1999. Today the Nelson family owns the house and they have done renovations to make their home modern while preserving its original special features.

Murchison Place Park

In June 2007 the Murchison Place was opened as beautiful sun-safe community playground and park. The park is located on the corner of the Clyde River Road and Trans Canada Highway. The land was donated to the community from the family of Dr. and Mrs. A.J. Murchison. To restore the land a 2-year plan was put into place to haul away broken trees, remnants of old building to landscape the property. To make the park a safe environment for children a fence was built around the perimeter of the property. Green spaces of the park got planned in to trees, shrubs and perennials. Students in the community built a gazebo, deck, bird houses and picnic tables for the park. Community volunteers in the community helped build a 700 feet wooden walking trail. The trail around the park and the ramp to the gazebo ensure that the park is wheelchair accessible. After the park was officially open work sill continued with the construction of a play park, tree house, adult swings and a basketball court. The community works together to maintain the park as there is annually spring and fall cleans up. Today many events are held in the Park such as Sunday school classes, family picnics, community socials, art and music shows which offers something for all ages in the community.

Clyde River Baptist Church

The Baptist Church is Clyde River was built on a piece of land purchased from John Murray on the Clyde River Road. The church first opened on January 22, 1893 and still worships every Sunday at 10:00 am.

Riverview Community Centre

The Riverview Community used to be the school house in Clyde River. Now the building acts as Clyde River's community centre. The building was maintained and owned by the Clyde River Women's Institute for many years but is now under the ownership of the Community of Clyde River. The centre is used to host Women's Institute meetings and functions, community social gatherings and Council meetings.
