= Lot 48, Prince Edward Island =

- Township
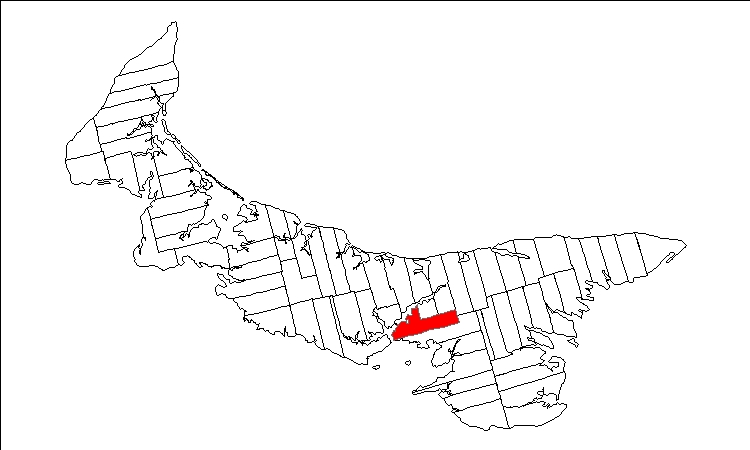
- Map of Prince Edward Island highlighting Lot 48
- Coordinates: 46°14′N 62°58′W
- Country: Canada
- Province: Prince Edward Island
- County: Queens County,
- Parish: Bedford Parish

Area
  - Total: 27.70 sq mi (71.75 km^{2})

Population (2006)
  - Total: 1,791
  - Density: 65/sq mi (25/km^{2})
- Time zone: UTC-4 (AST)
  - Summer (DST): UTC-3 (ADT)
- Canadian Postal code: C0A
- Area code: 902
- NTS Map: 011L02
- GNBC Code: BAESI

Lot 48 is a township in Queens County, Prince Edward Island, Canada. It is part of Bedford Parish. Lot 48 was awarded to Samuel Touchet and Lieutenant-Colonel James Cunningham in the 1767 land lottery.

The township includes the communities of Bethel, Mermaid, Mount Albion and Mount Herbert.
