= Bedeque =

Dissolved Canadian municipality

Coordinates: 46.337°N 63.724°W

Location of Bedeque in Prince Edward Island

Bedeque (/bəˈdɛk/) is a former municipality that previously held community status in the Canadian province of Prince Edward Island. It was dissolved through its amalgamation with the Community of Central Bedeque on November 17, 2014 to create the Community of Bedeque and Area.

Federal census population history of Bedeque
Year	Pop.	±%
1976	156	—
1981	162	+3.8%
1986	158	−2.5%
1991	151	−4.4%
1996	148	−2.0%
2001	154	+4.1%
2006	139	−9.7%
2011	143	+2.9%
2016	143	+0.0%
Source: Statistics Canada

== See also ==
- List of communities in Prince Edward Island
