= Kinkora, Prince Edward Island =

Kinkora
- Rural municipality
- Kinkora in Prince Edward Island
- Coordinates: 46.322°N 63.603°W
- Country: Canada
- Province: Prince Edward Island
- County: Prince County

Population (2021)
  - Total: 388
- Time zone: AST
  - Summer (DST): ADT
- Area code: 902

Kinkora is a rural municipality in Prince Edward Island, Canada.

== Demographics ==
Federal census population history of Kinkora
Year	Pop.	±%
1956	266	—
1961	271	+1.9%
1966	268	−1.1%
1971	272	+1.5%
1976	278	+2.2%
1981	283	+1.8%
1986	256	−9.5%
1991	253	−1.2%
1996	321	+26.9%
2001	315	−1.9%
2006	326	+3.5%
2011	339	+4.0%
2016	336	−0.9%
2021	388	+15.5%
Source: Statistics Canada

In the 2021 Census of Population conducted by Statistics Canada, Kinkora had a population of 388 living in 161 of its 169 total private dwellings, a change of 15.5% from its 2016 population of 336. With a land area of 3.97 km^{2} (1.53 sq mi), it had a population density of 97.7/km^{2} (253.1/sq mi) in 2021.
