= Lot 29, Prince Edward Island =

- Township
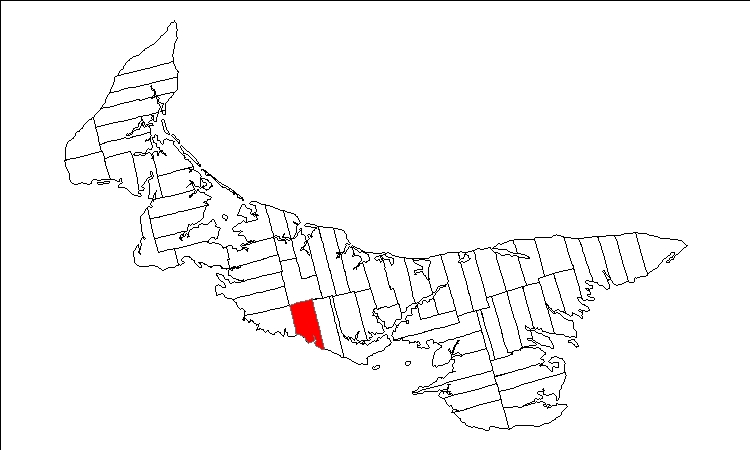
- Map of Prince Edward Island highlighting Lot 29
- Coordinates: 46°15′N 63°27′W
- Country: Canada
- Province: Prince Edward Island
- County: Queens County
- Parish: Hillsboro.

Area
  - Total: 83.65 km^{2} (32.30 sq mi)

Population (2006)
  - Total: 935
  - Density: 10.3/km^{2} (27/sq mi)
- Time zone: UTC-4 (AST)
  - Summer (DST): UTC-3 (ADT)
- Canadian Postal code: C0A
- Area code: 902
- NTS Map: 011L03
- GNBC Code: BAERP

Lot 29 is a township in Queens County, Prince Edward Island, Canada. It is part of Hillsboro Parish. Lot 29 was awarded to Admiral Charles Saunders in the 1767 land lottery.

== Communities ==
Incorporated municipalities:

- Crapaud
- Victoria

Civic address communities:

- Argyle Shore
- Crapaud
- DeSable
- Hampton
- Inkerman
- Kellys Cross
- South Melville
- Stanchel
- Westmoreland
- Victoria

== Demographics ==
Historical population
| Year | Pop. | ±% |
|---|---|---|
| 1871 | 1,957 | — |
| 1881 | 2,096 | +7.1% |
| 1891 | 1,970 | −6.0% |
| 1901 | 1,787 | −9.3% |
| 1911 | 1,500 | −16.1% |
| 1921 | 1,429 | −4.7% |
| 1931 | 1,217 | −14.8% |
| 1941 | 1,283 | +5.4% |
| 2006 | 935 | −27.1% |
