= Vernon River, Prince Edward Island =

Coordinates: 46.206°N 62.842°W

Location of Vernon River in Prince Edward Island

Vernon River is a settlement in Queens County, Prince Edward Island. Population of 38 people.
