= Murray River, Prince Edward Island =

Murray River
- Rural municipality
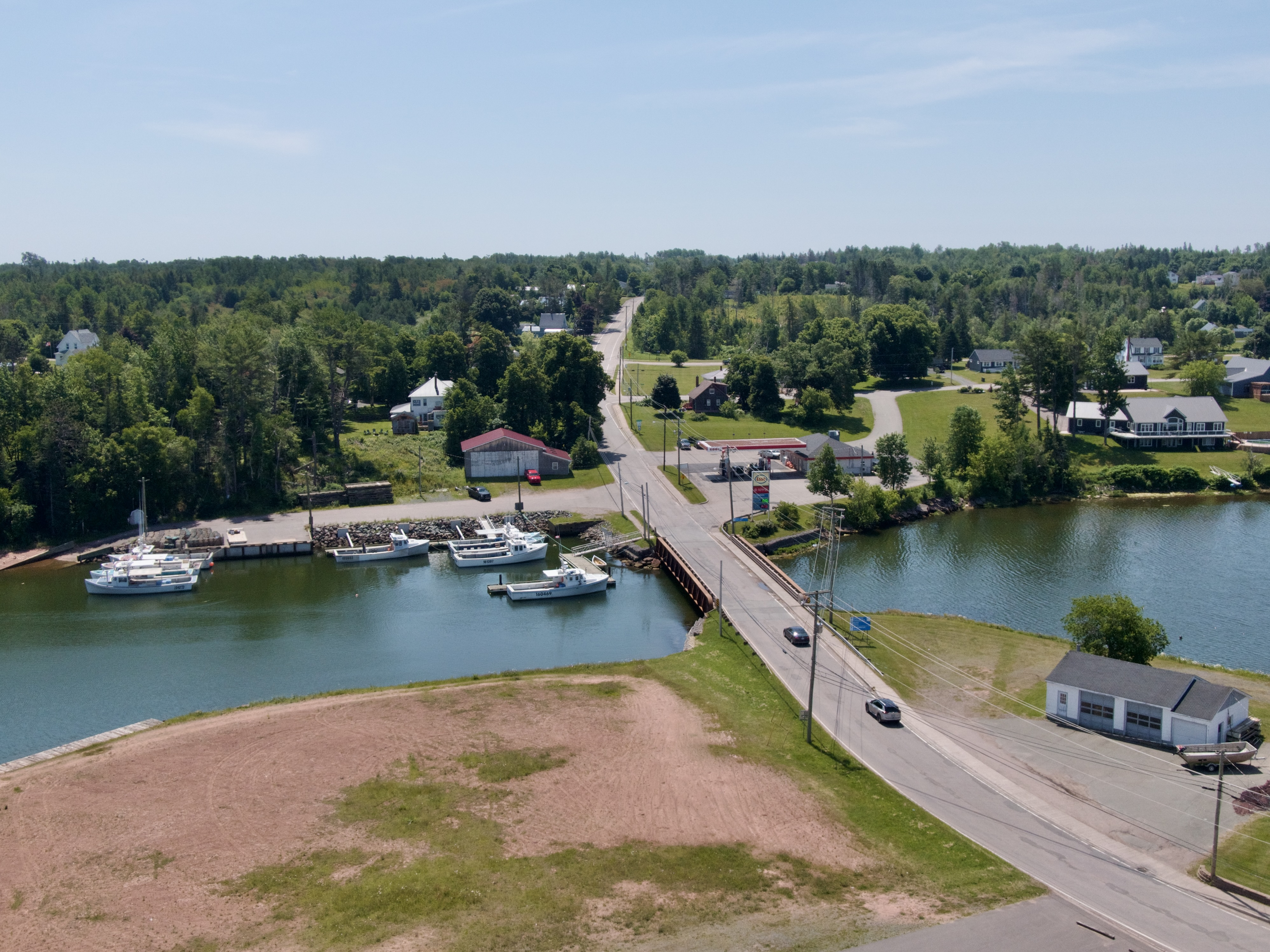

- Murray River in Prince Edward Island
- Coordinates: 46.017°N 62.616°W
- Country: Canada
- Province: Prince Edward Island
- County: Kings County

Population (2021)
  - Total: 337
- Time zone: AST
  - Summer (DST): ADT
- Area code: 902
- Telephone Exchange: 741 962

Murray River is a rural municipality in Prince Edward Island, Canada. It is located in Kings County.

Located in the southeast corner of the province, Murray River is bisected by a river of the same name. The community is located at the end of navigation on the river and hosts a small wharf for fishing and recreational vessel.

== Demographics ==
Federal census population history of Murray River
| Year | Pop. | ±% |
|---|---|---|
| 1956 | 450 | — |
| 1961 | 504 | +12.0% |
| 1966 | 522 | +3.6% |
| 1971 | 478 | −8.4% |
| 1976 | 463 | −3.1% |
| 1981 | 439 | −5.2% |
| 1986 | 476 | +8.4% |
| 1991 | 485 | +1.9% |
| 1996 | 420 | −13.4% |
| 2001 | 435 | +3.6% |
| 2006 | 430 | −1.1% |
| 2011 | 334 | −22.3% |
| 2016 | 304 | −9.0% |
| 2021 | 337 | +10.9% |
Source: Statistics Canada

In the 2021 Census of Population conducted by Statistics Canada, Murray River had a population of 337 living in 156 of its 182 total private dwellings, a change of 10.9% from its 2016 population of 304. With a land area of 1.54 km^{2} (0.59 sq mi), it had a population density of 218.8/km^{2} (566.8/sq mi) in 2021.

== Notable people ==
- Lorne Bonnell, former senator
- Brad Richards, former NHL player
- Brandon Gormley, professional ice hockey player
