= List of historic places in Kings County, Prince Edward Island =

This article is a list of historic places in Kings County, Prince Edward Island entered on the Canadian Register of Historic Places, whether they are federal, provincial, or municipal.

== List of historic places ==
Name	Address	Coordinates	Government recognition (CRHP №)	Wikidata ID	Image
The A.A. Building	577 Main Street; Montague PE	46°09′48″N 62°38′43″W	Prince Edward Island (8994)		Upload Photo
Aitken House	28 St. Andrews Point Road; Lower Montague PE	46°10′11″N 62°33′33″W	Prince Edward Island (12019)		Upload Photo
All Saints Roman Catholic Church	4279 Chapel Road - Route 321; Cardigan PE	46°14′33″N 62°37′20″W	Prince Edward Island (11344)		Upload Photo
Annandale Rear Range Lighthouse	Lighthouse Road; Annandale PE	46°16′00″N 62°26′17″W	Prince Edward Island (22597)		
Beck's Furniture and Appliances	18 Water Street; Montague PE	46°09′52″N 62°38′44″W	Prince Edward Island (9051)		Upload Photo
Edward Blaisdell Home	591 Main Street; Montague PE	46°09′47″N 62°38′37″W	Prince Edward Island (9055)		Upload Photo
Blanchard Cottage	35 Burkes Lane; Fortune PE	46°20′00″N 62°20′46″W	Prince Edward Island (15126)		Upload Photo
Brehaut-Beck House	3611 Cape Bear Road - Route 18; Guernsey Cove PE	45°58′33″N 62°31′13″W	Prince Edward Island (15901)		Upload Photo
John and Jocelyn Brothers Home	341 Shore Road; Cardigan PE	46°13′51″N 62°37′18″W	Prince Edward Island (10745)		Upload Photo
Bruce Road Pioneer Grave	Bruce Road - Route 349; Glenwilliam PE	46°02′40″N 62°38′52″W	Prince Edward Island (16061)		Upload Photo
Brudenell Community Centre	415 Brudenell Point Road - Route 319; Brudenell PE	46°11′28″N 62°37′46″W	Prince Edward Island (12098)		Upload Photo
Brudenell Island Pioneer Cemetery	Brudenell Island; Georgetown Royalty PE	46°11′48″N 62°34′45″W	Prince Edward Island (11659)		Upload Photo
John Burck House	580 Main Street; Montague PE	46°09′49″N 62°38′42″W	Prince Edward Island (8863)		Upload Photo
Caledonia Presbyterian Church	2064 Murray Harbour Road, Rte. 24; Caledonia PE	46°03′41″N 62°42′41″W	Prince Edward Island (18704)		Upload Photo
Anna Campbell Home	5692 Sparrows Road, Route 320; Victoria Cross PE	46°09′35″N 62°40′37″W	Prince Edward Island (10742)		Upload Photo
The Cannery at Basin Head Fisheries Museum	336 Basin Head Road; Basin Head PE	46°22′43″N 62°06′33″W	Prince Edward Island (7436)		Upload Photo
Cape Bear Lighthouse	42 Black Brook Road; Beach Point PE	46°00′13″N 62°27′28″W	Federal (11034, (21134), Prince Edward Island (19728)		
Cardigan Craft Centre	358 Shore Road; Cardigan PE	46°13′50″N 62°37′14″W	Prince Edward Island (10731)		Upload Photo
Chester's Barber Shop and Laurie's Beauty Salon	571 Main Street; Montague PE	46°09′48″N 62°38′46″W	Prince Edward Island (9151)		Upload Photo
Church of Christ	513 Main Street; Montague PE	46°10′16″N 62°39′05″W	Prince Edward Island (8841)		Upload Photo
Clow House	27 Mink River Road; Murray Harbour North PE	46°02′59″N 62°31′13″W	Prince Edward Island (19409)		Upload Photo
Edgar and Brenda Dewar Home	135 Dewars Road; Roseneath PE	46°12′04″N 62°38′52″W	Prince Edward Island (11973)		Upload Photo
Gordon Douglas House	13 Water Street; Georgetown PE	46°10′48″N 62°32′13″W	Prince Edward Island (11514)		Upload Photo
East Point Fog Alarm Building	East Point PE	46°27′08″N 61°58′18″W	Prince Edward Island (19205)		
Mary Elliot Home	11 Sunset Lane; Lower Montague PE	46°10′08″N 62°33′46″W	Prince Edward Island (10729)		Upload Photo
Elmira Railway Station	457 Elmira Road, Route 16A; Elmira PE	46°26′24″N 62°03′52″W	Prince Edward Island (4604)		
English Church Cemetery	Murray Harbour Road - Route 18; Murray Harbour South PE	46°00′14″N 62°31′14″W	Prince Edward Island (12844)		Upload Photo
Former Murray River United Church	9328 Main Street North; Murray River PE	46°00′59″N 62°36′54″W	Prince Edward Island (16441)		Upload Photo
Garden of the Gulf Museum	564 Main Street; Montague PE	46°09′50″N 62°38′50″W	Prince Edward Island (9318)		
Karen and Ron Garrett Home	13 Parkman Avenue; Montague PE	46°09′45″N 62°38′51″W	Prince Edward Island (11503)		Upload Photo
Georgetown Inn	62 Richmond Street; Georgetown PE	46°10′53″N 62°31′59″W	Prince Edward Island (1662)		Upload Photo
The Goff House	5127 Launching Road, Route 311; Woodville Mills PE	46°14′25″N 62°31′02″W	Prince Edward Island (5307)		Upload Photo
Government of Canada Building, Montague	551 Main Street North; Montague PE	46°09′56″N 62°38′57″W	Federal (11085), Prince Edward Island (19432)		Upload Photo
The Graphic Office	567 Main Street; Montague PE	46°09′49″N 62°38′50″W	Prince Edward Island (8910)		Upload Photo
Francis Hebert Machine Shop	45 Victoria Street; Georgetown PE	46°11′02″N 62°31′50″W	Prince Edward Island (11328)		Upload Photo
Holy Trinity Anglican Church	93 Grafton Street; Georgetown PE	46°10′59″N 62°31′49″W	Prince Edward Island (12046)		
Dan and Janet Hughes Home	615 Main Street; Montague PE	46°09′44″N 62°38′25″W	Prince Edward Island (8958)		Upload Photo
The Hyndman Building	543 Main Street; Montague PE	46°09′58″N 62°38′58″W	Prince Edward Island (8978)		Upload Photo
The Jackson House	601 Main Street; Montague PE	46°09′46″N 62°38′34″W	Prince Edward Island (9662)		Upload Photo
Kings County Courthouse	60 Kent Street; Georgetown PE	46°11′03″N 62°32′00″W	Prince Edward Island (7442)		
Knox's Dam	Route 320; Victoria Cross PE	46°09′31″N 62°40′31″W	Prince Edward Island (12038)		Upload Photo
Knox's Dam Bed and Breakfast	442 South Montague Road - Route 353; Victoria Cross PE	46°09′31″N 62°40′27″W	Prince Edward Island (12025)		
Launching 1790 Pioneer Cemetery	St. Michael's Lane; Launching PE	46°12′49″N 62°24′44″W	Prince Edward Island (16021)		Upload Photo
Launching Pioneer Cemetery	Primrose Road - Route 311; Launching PE	46°13′15″N 62°25′52″W	Prince Edward Island (12261)		Upload Photo
Lewis and Clara Ann Lavandier House	86 Grafton Street; Georgetown PE	46°10′58″N 62°31′52″W	Prince Edward Island (11401)		Upload Photo
Fred W. LeLacheur House	210 Route 18A; Murray Harbour PE	45°59′39″N 62°31′42″W	Prince Edward Island (15906)		Upload Photo
Lime Kiln - Zita Boudreault Property	651 Route 17; Lower Montague PE	46°10′24″N 62°36′24″W	Prince Edward Island (11369)		Upload Photo
Lime Kiln - Former Campbell Property	494 Route 17; Lower Montague PE	46°09′52″N 62°36′53″W	Prince Edward Island (15921)		Upload Photo
Little Sands United Church	11352 Shore Road, Route 4 Little Sands PE	45°57′58″N 62°38′45″W	Prince Edward Island (5255)		Upload Photo
Lubbert and Beaulieu Home	608 Main Street; Montague PE	46°09′47″N 62°38′30″W	Prince Edward Island (9136)		Upload Photo
The Mabon House	600 Main Street; Montague PE	46°09′47″N 62°38′33″W	Prince Edward Island (8937)		Upload Photo
Peter MacCallum House	89 Bay Shore Road; St. Peter's Bay PE	46°25′08″N 62°35′01″W	Prince Edward Island (1944)		Upload Photo
MacDonald House	65 Water Street; Georgetown PE	46°10′51″N 62°31′55″W	Prince Edward Island (11441)		Upload Photo
Dr. Gus MacDonald House	8 Church Avenue; Souris PE	46°21′17″N 62°15′16″W	Prince Edward Island (19661)		Upload Photo
Joe and Nora MacDonald Home	64 Pleasant Street; Cardigan PE	46°14′02″N 62°37′03″W	Prince Edward Island (11554)		Upload Photo
John A. MacDonald Store	4557 Wharf Road; Cardigan PE	46°13′51″N 62°37′07″W	Prince Edward Island (19169)		Upload Photo
Dr. Roddie MacDonald House	5707 St. Peters Road, Rte. 2 St. Peters Bay PE	46°24′53″N 62°35′07″W	Prince Edward Island (20485)		Upload Photo
MacEachern Barn	7737 Northside Road; Priests Pond PE	46°28′33″N 62°09′09″W	Prince Edward Island (19744)		Upload Photo
MacKay Pioneer Cemetery	Cemetery Road; Murray Harbour PE	46°00′22″N 62°30′48″W	Prince Edward Island (16043)		Upload Photo
The MacLaren Building	514 Main Street; Montague PE	46°10′11″N 62°39′02″W	Prince Edward Island (9059)		Upload Photo
Shirley MacNeill Home	117 Chestnut Street; Montague PE	46°09′46″N 62°38′46″W	Prince Edward Island (8893)		Upload Photo
Charles and Vicky Mahar Home	126 Grafton Street; Georgetown PE	46°11′01″N 62°31′39″W	Prince Edward Island (10703)		Upload Photo
Therese Mair House	20 Kent Street; Georgetown PE	46°10′54″N 62°31′56″W	Prince Edward Island (11204)		Upload Photo
Timothy Mair House	12 Kent Street; Georgetown PE	46°10′51″N 62°31′55″W	Prince Edward Island (12071)		Upload Photo
Archibald Matheson House	142 Albion Road, Route 327; Albion Cross PE	46°19′42″N 62°29′03″W	Prince Edward Island (1661)		Upload Photo
Matthew House	15 Breakwater Street; Souris PE	46°21′10″N 62°15′05″W	Prince Edward Island (19170)		Upload Photo
Matthew and McLean Heritage Building	95 Main Street; Souris PE	46°21′17″N 62°15′12″W	Prince Edward Island (5983)		Upload Photo
McLean House Inn	16 Washington Street; Souris PE	46°21′13″N 62°15′13″W	Prince Edward Island (18476)		Upload Photo
McNichol-Best House	57 Owens Wharf Road; Cardigan PE	46°13′50″N 62°36′54″W	Prince Edward Island (20525)		Upload Photo
Harvey Moore Wildlife Centre	7096 Commercial Road - Route 4 Milltown Cross PE	46°06′42″N 62°37′34″W	Prince Edward Island (12361)		Upload Photo
David and Catherine Morrison Home	610 Main Street; Montague PE	46°09′46″N 62°38′29″W	Prince Edward Island (9103)		Upload Photo
Duncan Munn Property	11533 Shore Road - Route 4 Little Sands PE	45°57′55″N 62°39′26″W	Prince Edward Island (15817)		Upload Photo
The Munroe House	41 Riverside Drive; Montague PE	46°09′46″N 62°39′15″W	Prince Edward Island (9160)		Upload Photo
Kenneth A. Murphy House	892 Route 17; Lower Montague PE	46°09′49″N 62°35′28″W	Prince Edward Island (11297)		Upload Photo
Murray River Pioneer Cemetery	Pioneer Cemetery Road; Murray River PE	46°00′37″N 62°35′32″W	Prince Edward Island (12834)		Upload Photo
Kent and Lyda Myers Home	2654 Route 3 New Perth PE	46°12′41″N 62°40′36″W	Prince Edward Island (12072)		Upload Photo
Manfred and Christian Ohlandt Property	58-62 Grafton Street; Georgetown PE	46°10′56″N 62°32′00″W	Prince Edward Island (11284)		Upload Photo
Panmure Island Lighthouse	Lighthouse Road; Montague PE	46°08′41″N 62°28′03″W	Federal (20731), Prince Edward Island (19723)		
Panmure Island Pioneer Cemetery	Lot 61; Panmure Island PE	46°08′17″N 62°30′07″W	Prince Edward Island (12205)		Upload Photo
Doug and Maureen Panting Home	625 Main Street; Montague PE	46°09′43″N 62°38′14″W	Prince Edward Island (9697)		Upload Photo
Terry Parker Home	13 Richmond Street; Georgetown PE	46°10′51″N 62°32′14″W	Prince Edward Island (10732)		Upload Photo
Perreault / Parent House	598 Main Street; Montague PE	46°09′48″N 62°38′34″W	Prince Edward Island (10736)		Upload Photo
The Pine's Bed and Breakfast	31 Riverside Drive; Montague PE	46°09′49″N 62°39′08″W	Prince Edward Island (9092)		Upload Photo
George Poole Home	430 Lower Montague Road; Lower Montague PE	46°10′11″N 62°33′43″W	Prince Edward Island (10725)		Upload Photo
Kenny and Annette Power House	612 Main Street; Montague PE	46°09′46″N 62°38′27″W	Prince Edward Island (9665)		Upload Photo
Samuel Prowse House	1278 Main Street; Murray Harbour PE	46°00′20″N 62°31′29″W	Prince Edward Island (15809)		Upload Photo
Red Bank Pioneer Cemetery	195 North Lake Harbour Road; North Lake PE	46°28′00″N 62°04′22″W	Prince Edward Island (16006)		Upload Photo
Silas Sewell Robertson Farm House	2937 East Point Road - Route 16; Kingsboro PE	46°23′53″N 62°05′37″W	Prince Edward Island (9288)		Upload Photo
Jean-Pierre Roma at Three Rivers National Historic Site of Canada	Brudenell PE	46°10′54″N 62°33′36″W	Federal (8459)		Upload Photo
Alvin Roy House	619 Main Street; Montague PE	46°09′44″N 62°38′21″W	Prince Edward Island (9669)		Upload Photo
St. Alexis Mission	Cemetery Road; Rollo Bay East PE	46°21′06″N 62°19′04″W	Prince Edward Island (1884)		Upload Photo
St. Andrew's Point Pioneer Cemetery	St. Andrew's Point Road; Lower Montague PE	46°09′32″N 62°31′37″W	Prince Edward Island (11600)		Upload Photo
St. Andrew's Presbyterian Church	268 Shore Road; Cardigan PE	46°13′57″N 62°37′30″W	Prince Edward Island (10722)		Upload Photo
St. David's United Church	50 Grafton Street; Georgetown PE	46°10′56″N 62°32′03″W	Prince Edward Island (11965)		Upload Photo
St. Margaret of Scotland Pioneer Cemetery	Bear Shore Road; St. Margarets PE	46°28′01″N 62°23′02″W	Prince Edward Island (13172)		Upload Photo
St. Mary's Roman Catholic Church	1 Longworth Street; Souris PE	46°21′34″N 62°15′11″W	Prince Edward Island (19171)		
St. Paul's Roman Catholic Church	1133 Cambridge Road - Route 17A; Sturgeon PE	46°06′26″N 62°32′01″W	Prince Edward Island (11275)		Upload Photo
St. Peter's Bay United Church	5781 St. Peter's Road - Route 2 St. Peter's Bay PE	46°24′50″N 62°35′25″W	Prince Edward Island (9666)		Upload Photo
St. Peter's Courthouse	5697 St. Peters Road, Rte 2 St. Peter's Bay PE	46°24′53″N 62°35′05″W	Prince Edward Island (20877)		Upload Photo
St. Peters Harbour Lighthouse	Lighthouse Road; St. Peter's Harbour PE	46°26′33″N 62°44′51″W	Federal (21013)		
Sir Isaac's Restaurant and Mister Gabe's Pub	576 Main Street; Montague PE	46°09′49″N 62°38′44″W	Prince Edward Island (8877)		Upload Photo
Ruby Smith Home	2965 Route 3 New Perth PE	46°12′42″N 62°41′48″W	Prince Edward Island (12092)		Upload Photo
Trent Sorrey House	599 Main Street; Montague PE	46°09′46″N 62°38′34″W	Prince Edward Island (9146)		Upload Photo
Souris Historic Lighthouse	134 Breakwater Street; Souris PE	46°20′47″N 62°14′47″W	Federal (10646), Prince Edward Island (18696)		
Souris Town Hall	75 Main Street; Souris PE	46°21′18″N 62°15′18″W	Prince Edward Island (18705)		Upload Photo
The Station	1 Station Street; Montague PE	46°09′53″N 62°38′54″W	Prince Edward Island (9374)		Upload Photo
Donald B. Taylor and Arlene Smith Home	73 Water Street; Georgetown PE	46°10′52″N 62°31′53″W	Prince Edward Island (11492)		Upload Photo
Tír na nÓg Inn	5749 St. Peters Road; St. Peter's Bay PE	46°24′51″N 62°35′18″W	Prince Edward Island (6275)		Upload Photo
Tower East Point Light Station	East Point PE	46°27′10″N 61°58′16″W	Federal (11479), Prince Edward Island (19729)		
Underhay House	1610 Route 310; Eglington PE	46°18′35″N 62°22′43″W	Prince Edward Island (19147)		Upload Photo
Marc and Janice Vandaele, Maple Lane B&B	1540 Whim Road - Route 316; Commercial Cross PE	46°07′30″N 62°38′41″W	Prince Edward Island (11520)		Upload Photo
Elizabeth Watson Home	20 Wood Islands Road; Montague PE	46°09′42″N 62°38′41″W	Prince Edward Island (8853)		Upload Photo
Joan Watson and Jackie Lavers Home	614 Main Street; Montague PE	46°09′46″N 62°38′25″W	Prince Edward Island (9375)		Upload Photo
Windows on the Water Restaurant	558 Main Street; Montague PE	46°09′54″N 62°38′55″W	Prince Edward Island (8949)		Upload Photo
Yeo House	569 Main Street; Montague PE	46°09′48″N 62°38′44″W	Prince Edward Island (9373)		Upload Photo

== See also ==
- List of historic places in Prince Edward Island
- List of National Historic Sites of Canada in Prince Edward Island
- Heritage Places Protection Act
