= Georgetown, Prince Edward Island =

Georgetown
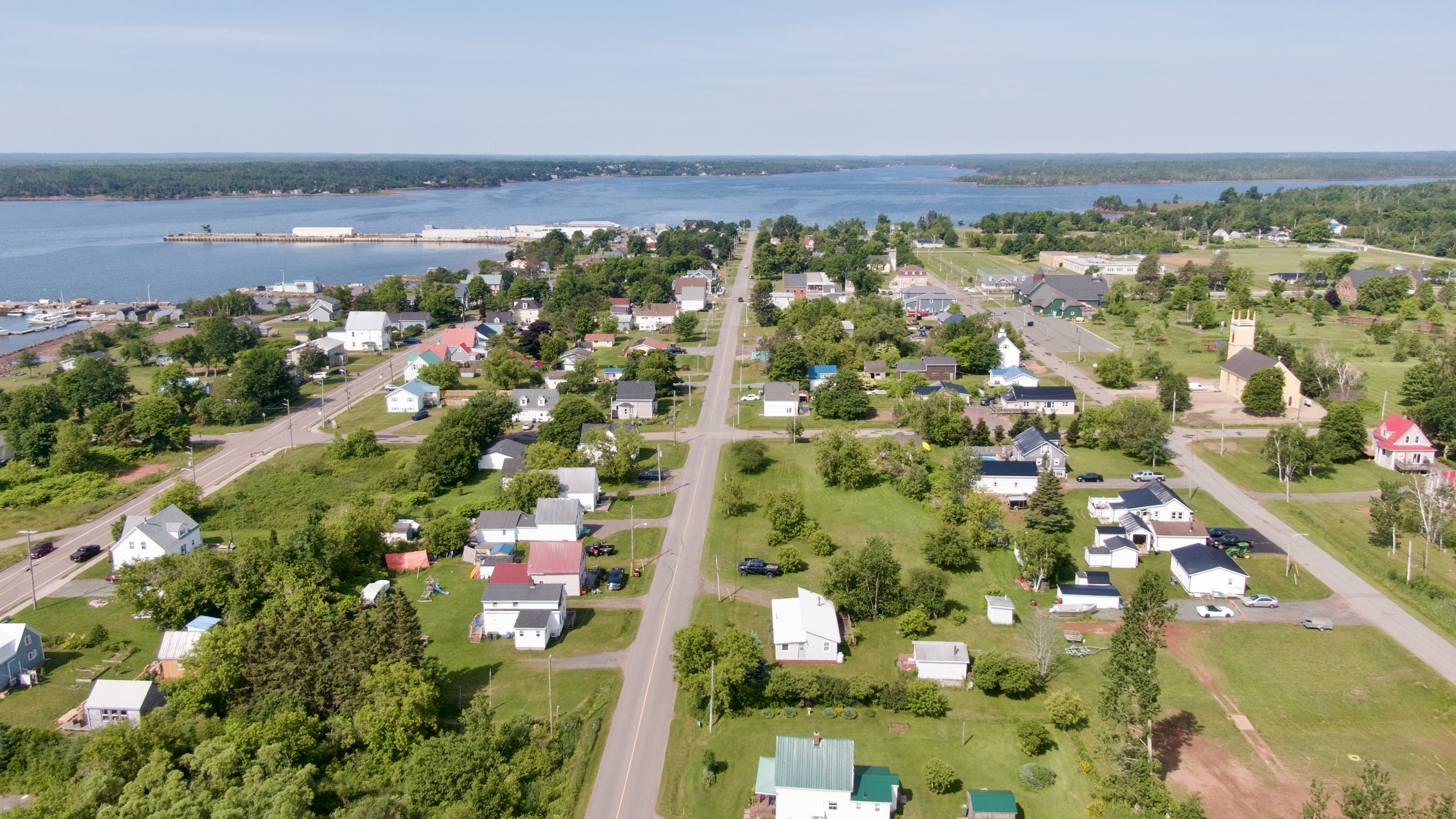
- Skyline of Georgetown

- Georgetown in Prince Edward Island
- Coordinates: 46°11′05″N 62°32′01″W
- Country: Canada
- Province: Prince Edward Island
- County: Kings County
- Founded: 1732
- Incorporated: 1912
- Amalgamated: September 28, 2018

Area
  - Land: 1.59 km^{2} (0.61 sq mi)

Population (2021)
  - Total: 544
  - Density: 348.1/km^{2} (902/sq mi)
- Time zone: UTC−4 (AST)
  - Summer (DST): UTC−3 (ADT)
- Canadian postal code: C0A 1L0
- Area code: 902
- Telephone Exchange: 652
- NTS Map: 011L02
- GNBC Code: BABDH

Georgetown is a community located within the municipality of Three Rivers in Kings County, Prince Edward Island, Canada. It is the Capital of Kings County. Previously incorporated as a town, it was amalgamated with the town of Montague, the rural municipalities of Brudenell, Cardigan, Lorne Valley, Lower Montague, and Valleyfield, and portions of three adjacent unincorporated areas in 2018 to create the town of Three Rivers.

== History ==
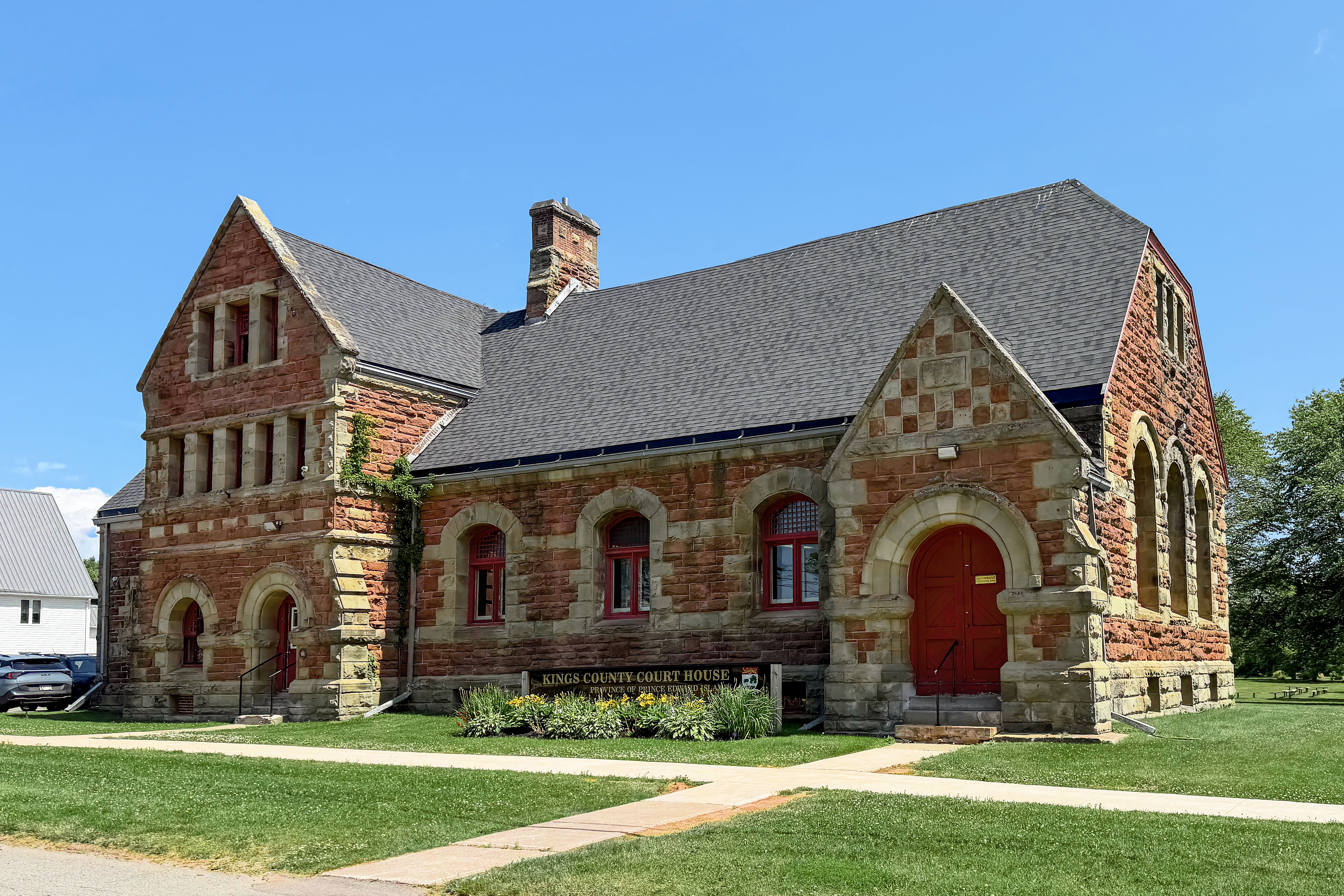
Georgetown, being the shiretown for Kings County, has the county's only provincial court house. It was erected in 1887.

This area of eastern Prince Edward Island traces its history of human settlement to the Mi'kmaq Nation, which long inhabited the area. These people were referred to as Epegoitnag and for them, the region was an Acadian forest. It had wild game, as well as fruit, berries and wild nuts for gathering, and plentiful marine resources in the nearby rivers and Northumberland Strait. The land in this area was called Samkook, which translates to 'the land of the sandy shore'.

Georgetown lies opposite Brudenell Point, which divides the Brudenell River to the north from the Montague River to the south. Brudenell Point was the location of the first permanent Acadian settlement; French colonists called the island Île-Saint-Jean. Here, entrepreneur Jean Pierre Roma landed in 1732 with approximately 100 settlers, to begin a commercial settlement to grow food and catch fish for provisioning the French military garrison at Fortress of Louisbourg on Île-Royale (now Cape Breton Island). French settlers called the area Trois-Rivieres (Three Rivers). In conflict over control of the region, British colonists burned the village in 1745, at the same time that they took control of Port-la-Joye.

Following the transfer of control of Acadia to Britain after it defeated France in the Seven Years' War in 1763, Captain Samuel Holland selected the entirety of Cardigan Point for the capital of Kings County, in a survey conducted for the Crown. He designated it as the township of Kings Royalty.

The county capital was to be named Georgetown in honour of King George III. The settlement was oriented on magnetic north, and a broad street network was designed.

Present-day Georgetown's collection of heritage buildings mostly dates to the late Victorian Era, when the community was at the height of its importance in the wooden shipbuilding industry. As one of the most important ports in the colony of Prince Edward Island, the port was selected in 1870 to be the eastern terminus of the Prince Edward Island Railway (PEIR). It also became a steamship terminal, with connections to the Intercolonial Railway on the mainland at Pictou, Nova Scotia. Georgetown's harbour was frequently the only port on the island that was usable during the winter months, because of prevailing wind and tide directions. (This was before the construction of the Canso Causeway altered sea ice patterns in the Northumberland Strait).

On September 28, 2018, the Town of Georgetown amalgamated with the Town of Montague, five nearby rural municipalities – Brudenell, Cardigan, Lorne Valley, Lower Montague, and Valleyfield – and portions of three adjacent unincorporated areas.

Georgetown is the birthplace of Prince Edward Island's 33rd Premier Dennis King.

== Geography ==
Georgetown, Capital of Kings County, was developed on an 8-kilometre-long peninsula formed by the Cardigan and Brudenell rivers, along with Georgetown Harbour. This peninsula forms part of the township of Georgetown Royalty, Prince Edward Island and extends into Cardigan Bay, a sub-basin of the Northumberland Strait to the east.

Georgetown Harbour is a deep natural harbour (nearly 11 metres). It lies to the south of the community at the confluence of the Brudenell River and the Montague River.

=== Climate ===
Climate data for Alliston (approximately 9.2 Km away from Georgetown)
Month	Jan	Feb	Mar	Apr	May	Jun	Jul	Aug	Sep	Oct	Nov	Dec	Year
Record high °C (°F)	15.0 (59.0)	15.0 (59.0)	18.3 (64.9)	26.1 (79.0)	30.6 (87.1)	32.8 (91.0)	33.9 (93.0)	36.1 (97.0)	32.2 (90.0)	25.0 (77.0)	21.1 (70.0)	17.8 (64.0)	36.1 (97.0)
Mean daily maximum °C (°F)	−2 (28)	−1.9 (28.6)	2.5 (36.5)	7.1 (44.8)	14.7 (58.5)	20.8 (69.4)	23.9 (75.0)	23.5 (74.3)	18.7 (65.7)	12.3 (54.1)	6.5 (43.7)	1.2 (34.2)	10.6 (51.1)
Daily mean °C (°F)	−6.6 (20.1)	−6.6 (20.1)	−1.9 (28.6)	2.9 (37.2)	9.4 (48.9)	15.3 (59.5)	19.1 (66.4)	18.6 (65.5)	14.1 (57.4)	8.4 (47.1)	3.0 (37.4)	−2.8 (27.0)	6.1 (43.0)
Mean daily minimum °C (°F)	−11.3 (11.7)	−11.2 (11.8)	−6.2 (20.8)	−1.3 (29.7)	4.1 (39.4)	9.7 (49.5)	14.1 (57.4)	13.8 (56.8)	9.5 (49.1)	4.4 (39.9)	−0.5 (31.1)	−6.9 (19.6)	1.5 (34.7)
Record low °C (°F)	−31 (−24)	−26.7 (−16.1)	−27.8 (−18.0)	−15 (5)	−6.7 (19.9)	−3.9 (25.0)	2.0 (35.6)	4.4 (39.9)	−0.6 (30.9)	−6.1 (21.0)	−13.3 (8.1)	−23.9 (−11.0)	−31 (−24)
Average precipitation mm (inches)	96.3 (3.79)	72.7 (2.86)	78.7 (3.10)	92.4 (3.64)	87.7 (3.45)	90.0 (3.54)	93.6 (3.69)	87.8 (3.46)	112.2 (4.42)	122.6 (4.83)	120.2 (4.73)	127.9 (5.04)	1,182.2 (46.54)
Average rainfall mm (inches)	42.6 (1.68)	30.2 (1.19)	41.2 (1.62)	68.5 (2.70)	86.1 (3.39)	90.0 (3.54)	93.6 (3.69)	87.8 (3.46)	112.2 (4.42)	120.5 (4.74)	106.8 (4.20)	83.6 (3.29)	963.1 (37.92)
Average snowfall cm (inches)	53.8 (21.2)	42.5 (16.7)	37.5 (14.8)	24.0 (9.4)	1.6 (0.6)	0.0 (0.0)	0.0 (0.0)	0.0 (0.0)	0.0 (0.0)	2.1 (0.8)	13.4 (5.3)	44.7 (17.6)	219.5 (86.4)
Average precipitation days (≥ 0.2 mm)	13.4	10.6	12.7	14.7	14.1	12.2	12.1	11.6	14.3	16.2	15.8	15.9	163.5
Average rainy days (≥ 0.2 mm)	5.8	4.6	7.9	11.8	14.0	12.2	12.1	11.6	14.3	16.0	14.2	9.8	134.3
Average snowy days (≥ 0.2 cm)	9.0	7.3	6.7	4.4	0.18	0.0	0.0	0.0	0.0	0.28	2.9	8.4	39.1
Source: Environment Canada

== Demographics ==
Federal census population history of Georgetown
Year	Pop.	±%
1921	719	—
1931	679	−5.6%
1941	769	+13.3%
1951	762	−0.9%
1956	754	−1.0%
1961	744	−1.3%
1966	826	+11.0%
1971	767	−7.1%
1976	732	−4.6%
1981	737	+0.7%
1986	729	−1.1%
1991	716	−1.8%
1996	732	+2.2%
2001	721	−1.5%
2006	634	−12.1%
2011	675	+6.5%
2016	555	−17.8%
2021	544	−2.0%
Source: Statistics Canada

== Infrastructure ==
The Port of Georgetown is a deep water harbour in Cardigan Bay on the east coast of Prince Edward Island, south of the Port of Souris. The port remains ice-free from April 15 through December 31. Shipping through winter is not required by any of the current clientele. Georgetown is approximately 100 km from the port of Charlottetown, the capital of the province.

The PEIR mainline from Georgetown extended through Montague Junction (where a spur was built to service nearby Montague) to Mount Stewart and on to Royalty Junction (connection to Charlottetown), Summerside and Alberton.

== Economy ==
In the 20th century, Georgetown's industrial base diversified to include the island's only shipyard, East Isle Shipyard. Now owned by J.D. Irving Limited (JDI), it is well known for its construction of tugboats, such as Atlantic Spruce, Atlantic Oak, and the Royal Canadian Navy's Glen class tugs.

The community is also home to the Island's largest saw mill (also owned by JDI). A major seasonal employer is a seafood plant, operated by Seafood 2000 and originally constructed by National Sea Products Limited.

== Local attractions ==
- Georgetown is adjacent to Brudenell River Provincial Park, which hosts a campground and tourist accommodations. Two of the province's top golf courses, Brudenell River Golf Course and Dundarave Golf Course, are at the Brudenell River Resort.
- A lit boardwalk along the water has benches, lookouts, a gazebo, and access to the beach.
- The Confederation Trail passes through Georgetown, offering water views, and good conditions for walking or cycling.
- 10 historical buildings are listed in Georgetown. A walking tour is available for visitors to show these and other buildings of interest.
- A.A. Macdonald Memorial Park is the largest garden in Prince Edward Island. it commemorates Andrew Archibald Macdonald, one of Canada's Fathers of Confederation. In 2015 it was nominated as one of Canada's Great Places.

== See also ==
- Royal eponyms in Canada
