= Valleyfield, Prince Edward Island =

Valleyfield
- Community
- Municipality of Valleyfield
- Valleyfield in Prince Edward Island
- Coordinates: 46.129°N 62.733°W
- Country: Canada
- Province: Prince Edward Island
- County: Kings County
- Incorporated: 1974

Population (2011)
  - Total: 672
- Time zone: AST
  - Summer (DST): ADT
- Area code: 902

Valleyfield was a municipality that held community status in Prince Edward Island, Canada. It was incorporated in 1974. On September 28, 2018, it was merged with six other municipalities (Georgetown, Montague, Brudenell, Cardigan, Lorne Valley, and Lower Montague) and adjacent unincorporated areas to create the town of Three Rivers.

== See also ==
- List of communities in Prince Edward Island
