= Lorne Valley =

- Community
- Municipality of Lorne Valley
- Lorne Valley in Prince Edward Island
- Coordinates: 46.268°N 62.685°W
- Country: Canada
- Province: Prince Edward Island
- County: Kings County
- Incorporated: 1978

Population (2011)
  - Total: 106
- Time zone: AST
  - Summer (DST): ADT
- Area code: 902
- Telephone Exchange: 887

Lorne Valley was a municipality that held a community status in Prince Edward Island, Canada. It was incorporated in 1978. On September 28, 2018, it was combined with six other municipalities (Georgetown, Montague, Brudenell, Cardigan, Lower Montague, and Valleyfield) to create the town of Three Rivers.

== See also ==
- List of communities in Prince Edward Island
