= Poole's Corner Provincial Park =

Provincial park of Prince Edward Island, Canada

Coordinates: 46°12′33.9″N 62°35′20″W

Poole's Corner Provincial Park is a provincial park in eastern Prince Edward Island, Canada. It is located southeast of Cardigan and northeast of Montague.
