= Brudenell River Provincial Park =

Provincial park of Prince Edward Island, Canada

Coordinates: 46°12′34.5″N 62°35′18.8″W

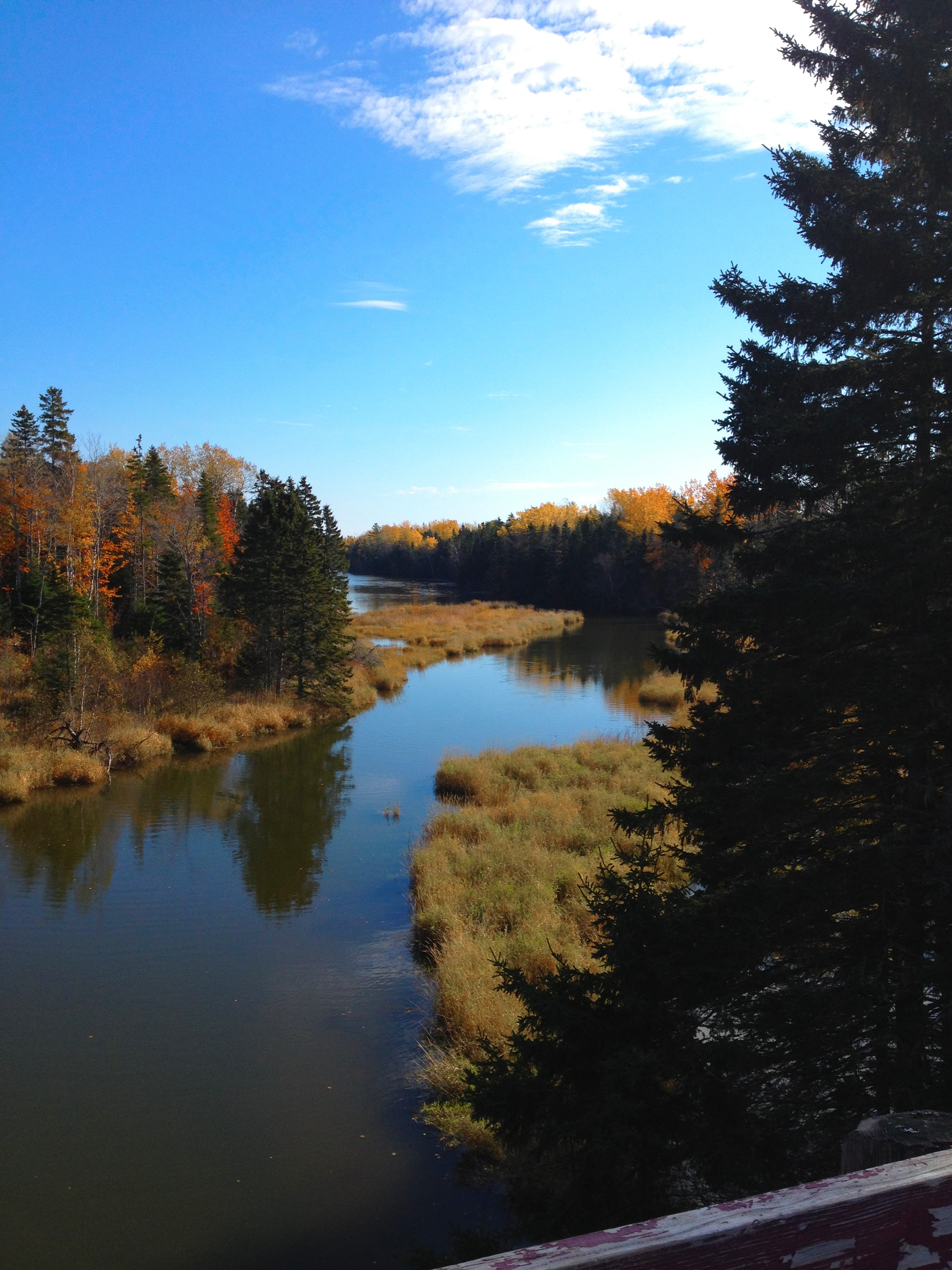
- The Confederation Trail in Brudenell River Provincial Park

- Location within Prince Edward Island
- Location: Prince Edward Island, Canada

Brudenell River Provincial Park is a provincial park in Prince Edward Island, Canada. It lies on the north side of the Brudenell River. Brudenell River is the largest provincial park in eastern Prince Edward Island. Some of its land is used by Rodd Brudenell River Resort. It has two public 18-hole golf courses, Brudenell River Golf Course and Dundarave Golf Course.
