= Lower Montague, Prince Edward Island =

Human settlement in Canada

Coordinates: 46°10′11″N 62°33′39″W

Lower Montague was a municipality that held community status in Prince Edward Island, Canada. It was located to the east of Montague.

The Community of Lower Montague was incorporated in 1974. The first inhabitants of the Island and the area later called Lower Montague were the First Nations Mi’kmag people who came to the Island seasonally and established summer camps. They called the island Abegweit or "resting on the wave". They mostly harvested the richness of forest, field and sea. An Indian burial site reportedly exists along the water's edge and the intersection with the Thornton Road.

Lower Montague formed the major part of Lot 59, which has a population of 1285 (2006 Census).

On September 28, 2018, it was merged with six other municipalities (two towns – Georgetown, Montague, Brudenell, Cardigan, Lorne Valley, and Valleyfield) to create the town of Three Rivers.
