= Hugh MacDonald (poet) =

Canadian poet and children's writer

- Born: 1945 (age 80–81)
- Occupation: Author
- Writing career
- Genres: Children's literature, poetry, fiction

Hugh MacDonald (born 1945) is a Canadian poet and children's writer and editor who lives in Montague, Prince Edward Island. Among his many awards are the L.M. Montgomery Children's Literature Award, 1990 and the 2004 Award for Distinguished Contribution to the Literary Arts on Prince Edward Island. He was appointed Poet Laureate for Prince Edward Island effective 1 January 2010 by the provincial legislature for a period of three years.

== Works ==
- Chung Lee Loves Lobsters – 1992
- Looking for Mother – 1995
- The Digging of Deep Wells – 1997
- Tossed Like Weeds from the Garden – 1999
- Landmarks: An Anthology of New Atlantic Canadian Poetry of the Land ed. with Brent MacLaine – 2001
- A Bountiful Harvest: 15 Years of the Island Literary Awards – 2002
- Cold Against the Heart – 2003
- Letting Go: An Anthology of Loss and Survival – 2005
- Murder at Mussel Cove – 2005
- Crosby and Me – 2010
- Chung Lee Loves Lobsters – 2011
- This is a Love Song – 2011
- I is for Island: A Prince Edward Island Alphabet – 2012
- The Last Wild Boy – 2013
- Morgan's Boat Ride −2014
- And All The Stars Shall fall-2017
