= Brudenell River Golf Course =

Golf course in Brudenell PEI, Canada

- Location within Prince Edward Island
- 46°12′29″N 62°35′47″W

Club information
- Location: Brudenell, Prince Edward Island
- Established: 1969
- Type: Public
- Owner: Province of Prince Edward Island
- Tota holes: 18
- Website: https://peisfinestgolf.com/brudenell/
- Designed by: C. E. Robbie Robinson
- Par: 72
- Length: 6055
- Course rating: 69.4
- Slope rating: 134

Brudenell River Golf Course is a public golf course located in Brudenell, Prince Edward Island. The course is an eighteen-hole course built by the provincial government of Prince Edward Island and was originally opened in 1969. The course gets its name from the Brudenell River, which is part of The Three Rivers, as several of the courses holes lie along the river. The Brudenell River Golf Course shares the practice grounds and clubhouse with its sister course Dundarave Golf Course.

== History ==
The Brudenell River golf course started out as a nine-hole course at the location of the current course. In the late 60s, a member of the Legislative Assembly, Lorne Bonnell, in conjunction with a group of the course's regulars, built the current course. The provincial government expanded the course to 18 holes with the intent of drawing tourism to the Eastern region of Prince Edward Island. The full 18-hole golf course officially opened in 1969.

In 2007, the provincial government began looking to sell the Brudenell River Golf course, along with the other three courses it owns. The reasoning behind the decision was the large expenditure of taxpayer money on course maintenance; losses from the four courses totaled $858,900 in the 2014-2015 golf season. Tourism Minister Robert Henderson was quoted as saying, "Obviously, when you're on the floor of the estimates [committee] … and you're saying you invested in this stuff, sometimes comments get made that maybe that would have been better spent on an X-ray machine or books," in relation to the government's decision to sell the courses. As of the 2015 golf season, no sale had been completed and the course is still maintained by the provincial government.

== Course ==
Brudenell River is one of Prince Edward Island's top golf courses. It has been awarded as one of the top 50 golf courses in Canada, and Top 6 Best Golf Resorts in Canada by Score Golf. The course lies beside the Brudenell River, which is part of The Three Rivers and from which the course receives its name. This course has a nontraditional par format, containing six par-3s, six par-4s and six par-5s. It shares practice grounds, clubhouse and intertwines with its sister course Dundarave Golf Course to make a 36-hole facility.

== Scorecard ==
Brudenell River
Tee	Rating/Slope	1	2	3	4	5	6	7	8	9	Out	10	11	12	13	14	15	16	17	18	In	Total
Blue	72.6/137	395	455	172	490	163	490	197	550	390	3302	135	466	390	370	185	555	225	553	360	3239	6541
White	69.4/134	375	434	161	460	135	475	180	503	322	3045	131	434	360	322	174	529	170	536	354	3010	6055
Red	72.5/130	325	348	140	390	90	395	131	425	278	2522	94	360	299	256	150	420	150	472	281	2482	5004
Par		4	4	3	5	3	5	3	5	4	36	3	5	4	4	3	5	3	5	4	36	72
SI		11	1	15	9	17	5	7	3	13		18	12	2	14	10	8	16	4	6

== See also ==
- List of golf courses in Prince Edward Island
