= Atlantic Spruce =

Ship built in 1995

History

Canada
- Name: Atlantic Spruce
- Owner: J.D. Irving Limited
- Builder: East Isle Shipyard, Georgetown
- Commissioned: 1997
- In service: March 10, 1995
- Identification: IMO number: 9174555; MMSI number: 316001070; Callsign: CFD7836
- Status: Active

General characteristics
- Type: Tugboat
- Tonnage: 392 GT
- Length: 30.8 m (101 ft)
- Beam: 11.14 m (36.5 ft)
- Draft: 4.78 m (15.7 ft)
- Depth: 5.21 m (17.1 ft)
- Propulsion: Two Caterpillar diesel engines
- Speed: 12-13 knots
- Capacity: 271 tons (fuel)
- Crew: 7

Atlantic Spruce is a fire fighting tug with a Robert Allan Design tug made from steel, equipped with fire fighting (FIFI-1) The original Atlantic Spruce was the first tug of her kind built in Georgetown PEI. Since her launch, there have been many tugs built with the same design and Atlantic Spruce continues the Irving-owned Atlantic Towing tradition of naming their tugs after trees; Atlantic Fir, Atlantic Hemlock, Atlantic Cedar, Atlantic Oak, and Atlantic Willow.

== Construction ==
Atlantic Spruce was first built in January 1995 at the East Isle shipyard in Georgetown, PEI, by J.D. Irving Limited. She was first registered on February 23, 1995, and was in service on March 10, 1995. On April 21, 1997, she departed Halifax and was sold to Johannes østensjødy in Haugesund, Norway.She was renamed Felix and continues to work in northwestern Europe. The second Atlantic Spruce, #4 of the series, was launched in 1997 as part of Atlantic Towing and was based in Point Tupper, Nova Scotia.

Atlantic Spruce was the first tug of a series of tugs built with a Robert Allan Design, powered by twin Rolls-Royce- Aquamaster ASD (azimuthing stern drive), with 4000 to 6000 bhp. She was the start of a new series of tugs built following the same design as hers, such as Atlantic Oak, Atlantic Fir and Atlantic Hemlock, built in the same shipyard as Atlantic Spruce. The run of 36 tugs based on Atlantic Spruce design represents the most successful line of tugs made in Eastern Canada. The first series of tugs are 4000 hp without a skeg. Next came the 5000 hp tugs with skegs and finally 5500–6000 series of three tugs built for LNG terminal work, also built with a skeg for escort work.

All tugs were built with Cat engines

The Atlantic Spruce has been working in Saint John as a harbour tug for a number of years

== Voyage to Mexico ==
Atlantic Towing's Atlantic Spruce was on her way to Vera Cruz, Mexico, on September 24–26, 1997. She was previously stationed at Statia Terminals in Port Hawkesbury. She was the second Atlantic tug to go to Mexico.

== Working in Venezuela ==
The present Atlantic Spruce was also at one time chartered out to an oil terminal in eastern Venezuela
