= Jean Pierre Roma =

French settler

Jean Pierre Roma was a French settler from the 18th century who settled at Three Rivers Roma in 1732 which is now a National Historic Site of Canada. It is located within what is now the small community of Brudenell, Prince Edward Island. The province was then called Ile St. Jean by the French to establish a trade operation.
