= Atlantic Oak =

Nova Scotian tug boat

History

Canada
- Name: Atlantic Oak
- Builder: East Isle Shipyard, Georgetown
- Launched: 2004
- Home port: Halifax
- Identification: IMO number: 9295672; MMSI number: 316004240; Callsign: CFH8951
- Status: Active

General characteristics
- Class & type: Tug
- Length: 28.79 m (94.5 ft)
- Beam: 11.14 m (36.5 ft)
- Draught: 5.24 m (17.2 ft)
- Propulsion: Twin screw
- Speed: 13 kn (24 km/h; 15 mph)

Atlantic Oak is a tug boat based out of Halifax, Nova Scotia. The boat is owned by Atlantic Towing Limited, which is owned by Irving Shipbuilding. Atlantic Oak was built by East Isle Shipyard Ltd. in Prince Edward Island and was commissioned in 2004. One of the boat's duties in the Harbour is to assist in launches at the Halifax Shipyard. The boat guides many tankers and bulk freighters along with other large ships into port.

== General characteristics ==
Atlantic Oak is a Z-drive class, with two Aquamaster US 225, Twin screw tug built to a design first used for the tug Atlantic Spruce. The boat has two Caterpillar 3516 HD engines with a top speed of 13 Knots. The boat carries on-board firefighting equipment and has an 80 tonne deck capacity. The boat is 28.79 metres (94.5 ft) long, 11.14 metres (36.5 ft) wide and draws 5.24 5.24 metres (17.2 ft).

== Notable events ==
In 2008 the dredging barge Shovel Master capsized after experiencing rough seas while being towed by Atlantic Larch from Saint John to Halifax for a refit. The crew were rescued by a CH-149 Cormorant search and rescue helicopter shortly before the barge capsized near Yarmouth. Atlantic Oak towed the capsized, but still floating barge, for only 150m before it sank, spilling thousands of gallons of diesel fuel, hydraulic fluid and waste oil.

On Jan 15th, 2013 the boat was seen guiding the damaged HMCS Athabaskan into dock at the NC jetty in Halifax.
