= List of rivers of Prince Edward Island =

This is a list of rivers and creeks located on the island of Prince Edward Island.

Despite the fact that many are called rivers, their freshwater portions are not large enough to warrant this name. These watercourses are more correctly categorized as streams, with the majority of their length being tidal inlets or estuaries where the small amount of fresh water interchanges with salt water from the Gulf of St. Lawrence or Northumberland Strait.

- Atlantic watershed
  - Gulf of Saint Lawrence watershed
    - Anderson River
    - Cat River
    - Barbara River
    - Battis River
    - Bear River
    - Beatons River
    - Bedeque River
    - Belle River
    - Bentick River
    - Bideford River
    - Big Pierre Jacques River
    - Black River
    - Brudenell River
    - Boughton River
    - Bradshaw River
    - Brae River
    - Brooks River
    - Cape Traverse River
    - Cardigan River
    - Cow River
    - Crooked River
    - Cross River
    - Desable River
    - Dirty River
    - Dock River
    - Dunk River
    - Enmore River
    - Flat River
    - Fortune River
    - Fox River
    - Foxley River
    - French River
    - George river
    - Goodwood River
    - Goose River
    - Grand River
    - Greek River
    - Haldiman River
    - Hay River
    - Hills River
    - Hillsborough (East) River
      - Johnstons River
      - Pisquid River
      - Glenfinnan River
    - Hollow River
    - Hope River
    - Hunter River
    - Huntley River
    - Indian River
    - Jacques River
    - Kildare River
    - Little Pierre Jacques River
    - Long River
    - MacDonalds River
    - Marie River
    - Mary River
    - McAskill River
    - Midgell River
    - Mill River
    - Miminegash River
    - Mink River
    - Mitchell River
    - Montague River
    - Montrose River
    - Morell River
    - Murray River
    - Naufrage River
    - Newtown River
    - North (Yorke) River
    - Oak River
    - Orwell River
    - Ox River
    - Oyster River
    - Percival River
    - Pinette River
    - Platte River
    - Portage River
    - Seal River
    - Sheep River
    - Shipyard River
    - Smelt River
    - Souris River
    - Southwest River
    - St. Peters River
    - Stanley River
      - Founds River
    - Sturgeon River
    - Tignish River
    - Trout River
    - Tryon River
    - Valleyfield River
    - Vernon River
    - West (Elliot) River
      - Clyde River
    - Westmoreland River
    - Wheatley River
    - Wilmot River
    - Winter River, source of drinking water for Charlottetown

== See also ==
- List of rivers of Canada
