= Montague, Prince Edward Island =

Montague
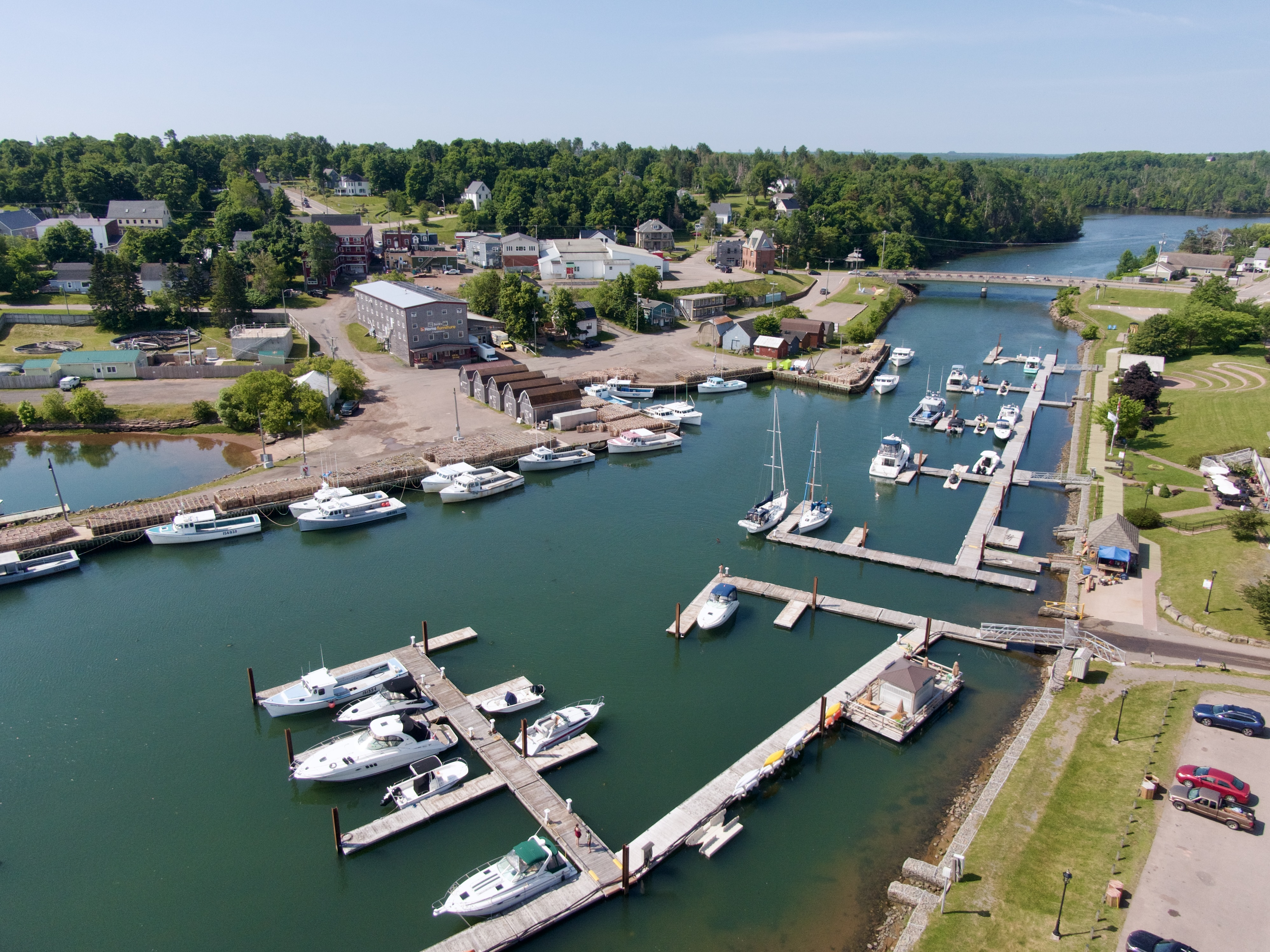
- Montague marina and skyline

- Flag Seal
- Motto: Prosper Fair Montague
- Location of Montague in PEI
- Coordinates: 46°10′11″N 62°39′14″W
- Country: Canada
- Province: Prince Edward Island
- County: Kings County
- Founded: 1732
- Incorporated: April 26, 1917
- Amalgamated: September 28, 2018

Area
  - City: 3.16 km^{2} (1.22 sq mi)
- Elevation: 28 m (92 ft)

Population (2021)
  - City: 2,027
  - Density: 620.8/km^{2} (1,608/sq mi)
  - Metro: 6,011
  - Change (2011-16): ▲3.4%
- Time zone: UTC−4 (Atlantic (AST))
  - Summer (DST): UTC−3 (ADT)
- Postal code: C0A 1R0
- Area code: 902
- Telephone Exchange: 313 326 361 784 838 846 969
- NTS Map: 011L02
- GNBC Code: BABTL
- Website: Official website

Montague is a community within the Town of Three Rivers in Kings County, Prince Edward Island, Canada. Previously incorporated as a town, it amalgamated with the Town of Georgetown, the rural municipalities of Brudenell, Cardigan, Lorne Valley, Lower Montague, and Valleyfield, and portions of three adjacent unincorporated areas in September 2018 to form the Town of Three Rivers.

Montague is the largest population centre in the county and straddles the Montague River which is the dividing line between the townships of Lot 52 and Lot 59. The community functions as a regional service centre for the eastern end of the province, supporting two supermarkets, three hardware stores, a number of independent businesses, and several fast food restaurants, banks, and car dealerships.

== General information ==
Montague is home to the Kings County Memorial Hospital, provincial government offices, and the Montague Curling Club, along with an elementary, intermediate and regional high school. A number of older homes and commercial buildings have been replaced with new, suburban style development along Main Street, particularly in the north end. A large scale redevelopment of the community's waterfront has taken place in recent years.

The community is located 44 km east of Charlottetown and 15 km southwest of Georgetown.

== History ==
In 1732, Jean-Pierre Roma, an Acadian French merchant, settled a site a few miles east of present-day Montague that he called Trois Rivieres, now The Three Rivers. It is now a designated historic site, which brings to life his story and how he established there an international trading post. Its interpretive centre is open from the last week of June to the last week of September each year. Unfortunately for him and his business, the French Army on Ile St. Jean were to be defeated by the British in 1745, in an act of ethnic cleansing in which the Acadian population was deported and lost all their earthly goods.

At the time of Samuel Holland's survey in the 1760s, Georgetown was designated as the shire town of Kings County. The Montague River was the southernmost of three rivers draining the area. Eventually Lower Montague, Montague Road and Montague Bridge were named after the river. The river itself traces its name to either George Brudenell, 4th Earl of Cardigan (later George Montagu, 1st Duke of Montagu), John Montagu, 4th Earl of Sandwich, or Montague Wilmot, Governor of Nova Scotia (which then included St. John's Island - present-day Prince Edward Island) at the time of Holland's survey.

The Garden of the Gulf Museum (c. 1887 to 1888) is on the Canadian Register of Historic Places.

=== Recent events ===
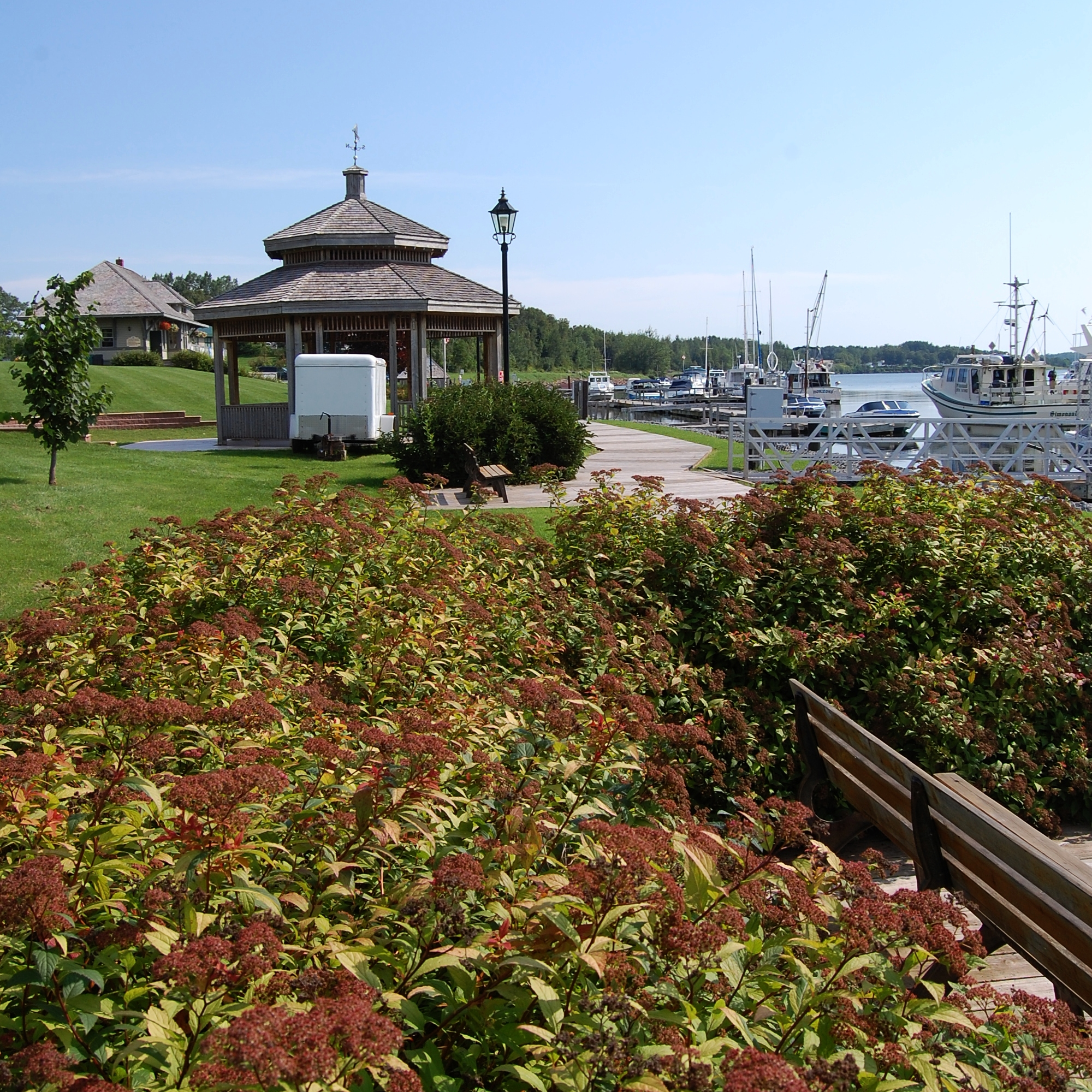
Montague waterfront

Montague is notable as the first community to combine a Wendy's restaurant and a Tim Hortons franchise under one roof. In 1992, the owner of both franchises in Prince Edward Island, Daniel P. Murphy, opened a new outlet for both brands in the same building in the community. He invited Ron Joyce and Wendy's chairman Dave Thomas to the grand opening, where the two executives met for the first time and established an immediate rapport. Murphy's success with the combined operation led to an agreement resulting in a merger of Wendy's and Tim Hortons (TDL Group) in 1995.

Montague has had several modest property developments in recent decades, consisting of several subdivisions, as well as new big box retail and institutional buildings.

The bridge carrying Route 4 across the Montague River was replaced in December 2007.

The Cavendish Farms Wellness Centre opened in 2009 on the southern edge of the community beside the existing Atlantic Fitness Centre East complex. This facility includes an Olympic sized hockey arena, municipal offices, meeting rooms, two indoor walking tracks and the local library.

In early 2010, the provincial Department of Fisheries, Aquaculture and Rural Development relocated from Charlottetown to a new building in downtown Montague.

Montague Regional High School opened for the 2010–2011 school year at the southern edge of the community on Valleyfield Road.

In 2011, the intersection of the Wood Islands Rd (Route 4) and the Valleyfield Rd (Route 326) was replaced by Kings County's first roundabout.

In 2014, the 30-room Riverhouse Inn hotel opened, and Aspin Kemp & Associates' world headquarters relocated to Montague, along with the relocation of a construction facility for the marine supply company to nearby Poole's Corner.

The same year, Montague also received $320,000 of federal and provincial funding for cultural development, which was used in the construction of a waterfront art gallery, park construction, and the installation of several historic murals throughout the community.

In July 2016, the Montague local council elicited controversy when it voted 2-4 against a request to fly the pride flag during pride month.

On September 28, 2018, the Town of Montague amalgamated with the Town of Georgetown, five nearby rural municipalities – Brudenell, Cardigan, Lorne Valley, Lower Montague, and Valleyfield, and portions of three adjacent unincorporated areas to form the Town of Three Rivers.

== Demographics ==
Federal census population history of Montague
Year	Pop.	±%
1921	706	—
1931	803	+13.7%
1941	769	−4.2%
1951	1,068	+38.9%
1956	1,152	+7.9%
1961	1,126	−2.3%
1966	1,289	+14.5%
1971	1,608	+24.7%
1976	1,827	+13.6%
1981	1,957	+7.1%
1986	1,994	+1.9%
1991	1,901	−4.7%
1996	1,995	+4.9%
2001	1,945	−2.5%
2006	1,802	−7.4%
2011	1,895	+5.2%
2016	1,961	+3.5%
2021	2,027	+3.4%
Source: Statistics Canada

== Government ==
As of September 28, 2018, Montague is governed by the Town of Three Rivers. The Kings District of the Royal Canadian Mounted Police (RCMP) serve the community from their headquarters just north of Montague, with one officer exclusively serving the community.

== Culture ==
Montague celebrates its birthday the first week after Canada day every year with an annual tradition called Montague Days, with activities including midway, buskers, soap box derby, Miss Montague contest, a pet parade, a parade (missed in 2007 due to construction of the bridge) and a fireworks display on the Montague Waterfront to wrap up the weekend long festival. The Montague Waterfront also plays host to musical acts and various other activities all weekend long. The gazebo at the waterfront was constructed by local carpenter, Shane Phillip MacDonald. He described it as his magnum opus.

== Education ==
Montague is home to three English Language School Board schools:

- Montague Consolidated School
- Montague Intermediate School
- Montague Regional High School

The provincial community college, Holland College, has a location in the Down East Mall, in a wing named the "Montague Centre."

== Sports ==
Montague is home to several sports teams and recreation programs. It has running tracks, recreational trails, parks, and playing fields for soccer, rugby, football, field hockey, softball and baseball. The community also has a swimming pool and fitness centre along with basketball courts and nearby tennis courts. The Eastern Eagles Soccer Complex, on the southern edge of the community, is home to the regional soccer teams, the Eastern Eagles. The Eastern Eagles host a soccer tournament for other teams on Prince Edward Island and those from out of province every summer. In 2009, the Cavendish Farms Wellness Centre opened, giving a new home to the Montague Norsemen hockey teams and replacing the aging Iceland Arena. It also gave Montague junior B and senior hockey teams, the Montague Maniacs and Montague Marines. The community is also home to the Montague Curling Club, which takes in curlers from all of Kings County. Montague Regional High School and Montague Intermediate School are also home to many male and female sports teams.

== Climate ==
Montague has a humid continental climate (Dfb) with short, warm summers with cool nights and long, cold, and wet winters.

Climate data for Montague
Month	Jan	Feb	Mar	Apr	May	Jun	Jul	Aug	Sep	Oct	Nov	Dec	Year
Record high °C (°F)	11.8 (53.2)	12.5 (54.5)	22.6 (72.7)	23.3 (73.9)	32 (90)	33.2 (91.8)	36.3 (97.3)	33.9 (93.0)	32.7 (90.9)	24.4 (75.9)	21.2 (70.2)	15.6 (60.1)	36.3 (97.3)
Mean daily maximum °C (°F)	−3.4 (25.9)	−3 (27)	1.2 (34.2)	6.7 (44.1)	14 (57)	19.6 (67.3)	23.6 (74.5)	22.9 (73.2)	18 (64)	11.9 (53.4)	5.6 (42.1)	−0.3 (31.5)	9.7 (49.5)
Mean daily minimum °C (°F)	−12.3 (9.9)	−11.7 (10.9)	−6.8 (19.8)	−1.1 (30.0)	4.7 (40.5)	10.2 (50.4)	14.5 (58.1)	14.2 (57.6)	9.8 (49.6)	4.4 (39.9)	−0.9 (30.4)	−8 (18)	1.4 (34.5)
Record low °C (°F)	−29.9 (−21.8)	−26.1 (−15.0)	−23.9 (−11.0)	−13.4 (7.9)	−5 (23)	0 (32)	6.7 (44.1)	4.4 (39.9)	−0.1 (31.8)	−5.6 (21.9)	−13.3 (8.1)	−25.6 (−14.1)	−29.9 (−21.8)
Average precipitation mm (inches)	100.1 (3.94)	75.1 (2.96)	83.8 (3.30)	79.7 (3.14)	94 (3.7)	84.4 (3.32)	84.8 (3.34)	88.3 (3.48)	91.7 (3.61)	94.5 (3.72)	96.7 (3.81)	105 (4.1)	1,078 (42.4)
Source: Environment Canada

== Attractions ==
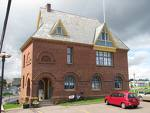
Garden of the Gulf Museum

Montague's main attraction is the community itself, aptly named "Montague the Beautiful" for its tree-lined streets, tranquil river and stately buildings. Other draws include the Garden of the Gulf Museum (the oldest museum in the province), the Canada Tree, the Montague Curling Club, Cavendish Farms Wellness Centre, Montague Regional High School, the Down East Mall, Station Street Adventure Company, and Gillis' Drive-In Restaurant (in Brudenell). Montague is also a starting point of the Confederation Trail, linking many communities across P.E.I. The former train station has been renovated into a café, gift shop and information centre, looking out over the river.

== Economy ==
Like much of the province, the area's three main industries are fishing, farming and tourism. Montague is home to many independent businesses, along with several chains primarily in the North End. Several large employers include the new Department of Fisheries, Aquaculture and Rural Development, the Provincial Addictions Centre, Vital Statistics, On-Line Support, Shoppers Drug Mart, Mariner Seafoods, Cavendish Farms potato processing plant in Pooles Corner, Real Atlantic Superstore, and Sobeys. The community itself has no designated industrial areas, however neighbouring communities, notably Pooles Corner, have several industrial businesses.

Montague has a public wharf located in Lower Montague on the South shore of the Montague River at Wightmans Point Road.

The region's weekly newspaper, the Eastern Graphic, is based in Montague.

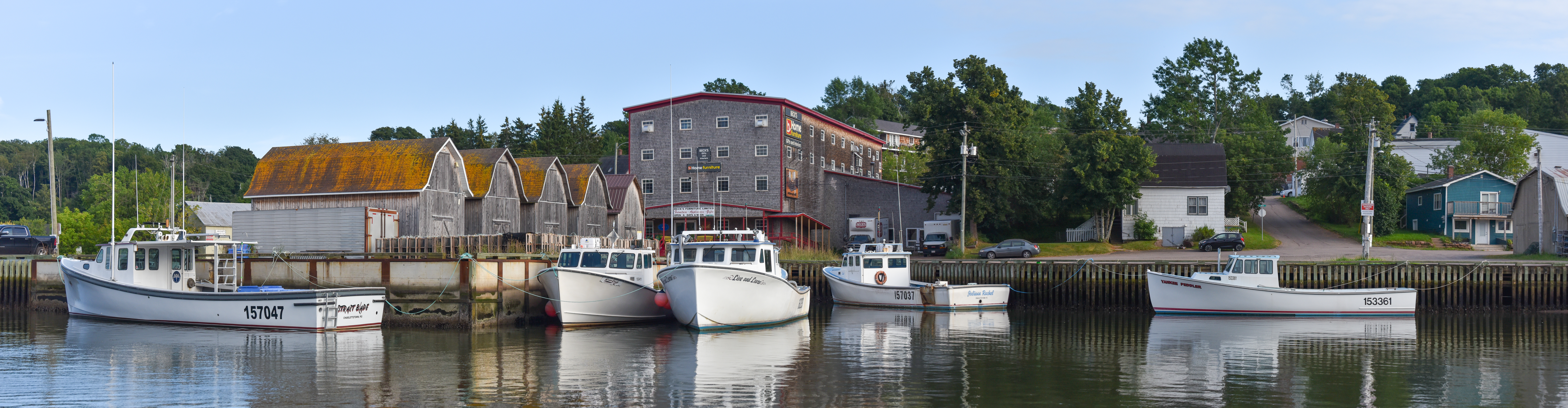
Fishing boats in Montague Harbor

== Neighbourhoods ==
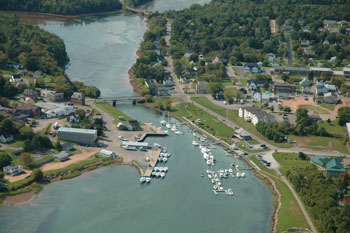
Aerial view of Montague

"Greater Montague," which includes outlying areas outside the actual community, has a population of over 6,000. It comprises several neighbourhoods, including:

- Brudenell
- Downtown Montague
- Lower Montague
- North End
- Pooles Corner
- South End
- Valleyfield
- Victoria Cross

== Notable people ==
- William Bennett Campbell, 24th Premier of PEI
- Hugh MacDonald, poet
- Brooke Miller, singer, songwriter and musician
