= Three Rivers, Prince Edward Island =

Three Rivers
- Town
- Town of Three Rivers
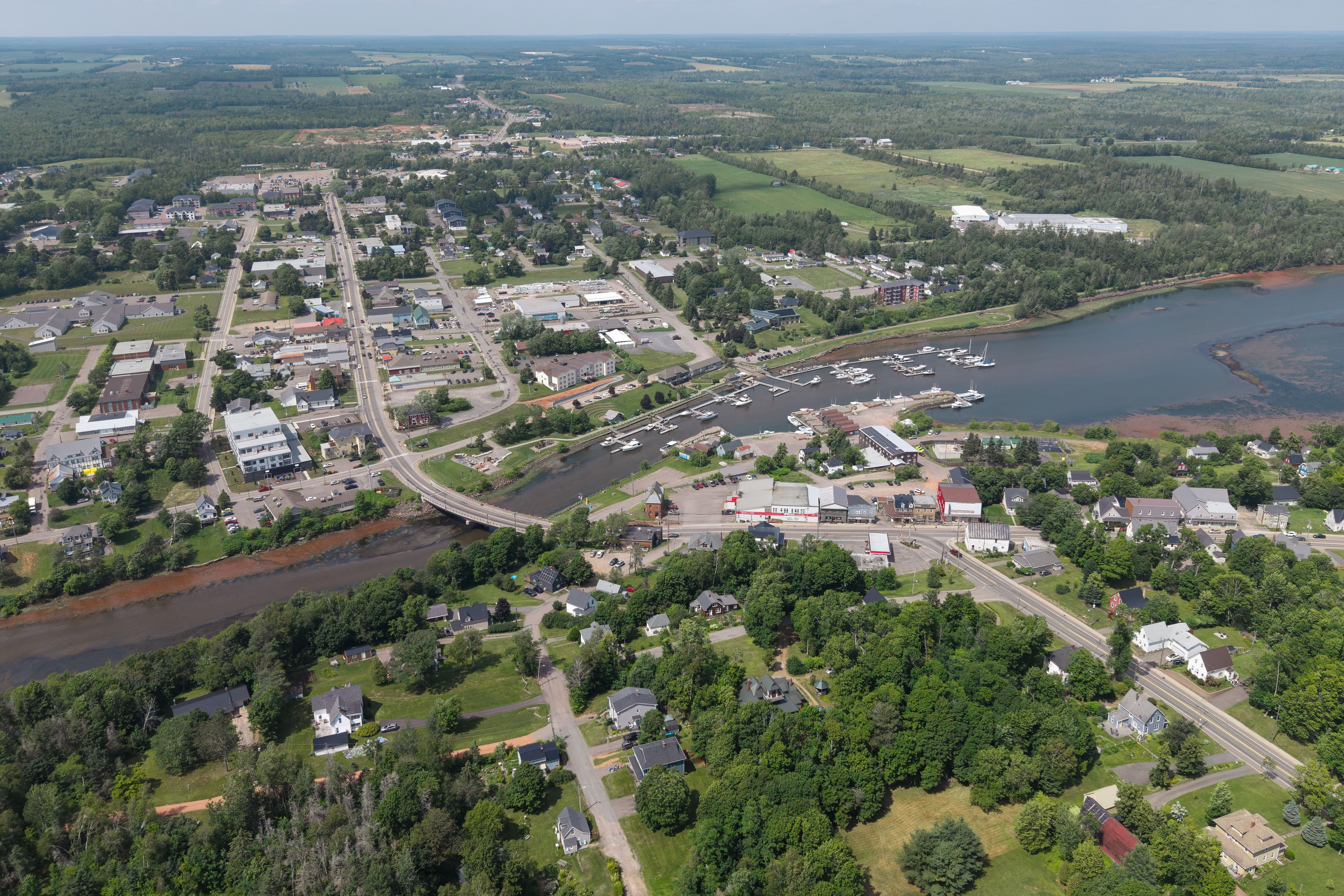
- Montague, the largest community in Three Rivers

- Location of Three Rivers in Prince Edward Island
- Coordinates: 46°11′53″N 62°37′16″W
- Country: Canada
- Province: Prince Edward Island
- County: Kings County

Government
  - Type: Town council

Area
  - Land: 431.47 km^{2} (166.59 sq mi)
- Highest elevation: 13 m (43 ft)
- Lowest elevation: 0 m (0 ft)

Population (2021)
  - Total: 7,883
  - Density: 18.3/km^{2} (47/sq mi)
- Time zone: UTC-4 (AST)
  - Summer (DST): UTC-3 (ADT)
- Area code: 902
- Website: www.threeriverspei.com

Three Rivers is a town within Kings County in Prince Edward Island, Canada, that was incorporated on September 28, 2018, through an amalgamation of seven municipalities and adjacent unincorporated areas. The municipalities that were amalgamated included two towns – Georgetown and Montague – and five rural municipalities – Brudenell, Cardigan, Lorne Valley, Lower Montague, and Valleyfield.

== Demographics ==
Federal census population history of Three Rivers
Year	Pop.	±%
2016	7,169	—
2021	7,883	+10.0%
Source: Statistics Canada

In the 2021 Census of Population conducted by Statistics Canada, Three Rivers had a population of 7,883 living in 3,246 of its 3,936 total private dwellings, a change of 10% from its 2016 population of 7,169. With a land area of 431.47 km^{2} (166.59 sq mi), it had a population density of 18.3/km^{2} (47.3/sq mi) in 2021.

Name	Former municipal status	Original incorporation year	2016 Census of Population				
Name	Former municipal status	Original incorporation year	Population (2016)	Population (2011)	Change	Land area (km^{2})	Population density
Brudenell	Rural municipality	1973	371	362	+2.5%	20.4	18.2/km^{2}
Cardigan	Rural municipality	1954	269	332	−19.0%	5.12	52.5/km^{2}
Georgetown	Town	1912	555	675	−17.8%	1.59	349.1/km^{2}
Lorne Valley	Rural municipality	1978	95	106	−10.4%	17.7	5.4/km^{2}
Lower Montague	Rural municipality	1974	598	665	−10.1%	21.8	27.4/km^{2}
Montague	Town	1917	1,961	1,895	+3.5%	3.16	620.6/km^{2}
Valleyfield	Rural municipality	1974	670	672	−0.3%	78.6	8.5/km^{2}
Total former municipalities	–	–	4,519	4,707	−4.0%	148.37	30.5/km^{2}

== Government ==
The Town of Three Rivers was governed by an interim council comprising an interim mayor (Merrill Scott) and ten interim councillors. Seven of these interim councillors were the former mayors of the two towns and the five rural municipalities that were amalgamated to incorporate the Town of Three Rivers, while the three others were provincially-appointed representatives of the previously unincorporated areas. The first election for a mayor and twelve councillors was held on November 5, 2018, resulting in Edward MacAulay being selected as mayor and Jane King, Alan Munro, Gerard Holland, Ronnie Nicholson, Cameron MacLean, David McGrath, Cindy MacLean, Cody Jenkins, Isaac MacIntyre, Debbie Johnston, John MacFarlane and Wayne Spin as council members.

Three byelections took place between the 2018 and 2022 elections. MacIntyre resigned and his seat was won by Paul Morrison. Spin's resignation led to a byelection won by Larry Creed. Nicholson later resigned and was replaced by Hannah Martens.

As of the November 2022 municipal election, the size of council was reduced from 12 to 8. Johnston was elected as mayor and Munro, MacLean, Jenkins and MacFarlane remained on council. Spin returned to the fold while Anne Van Donkersgoed, John Van Dyke and Martina MacDonald were newly elected.
