= Dundarave Golf Course =

Golf course in Brudenell PEI, Canada

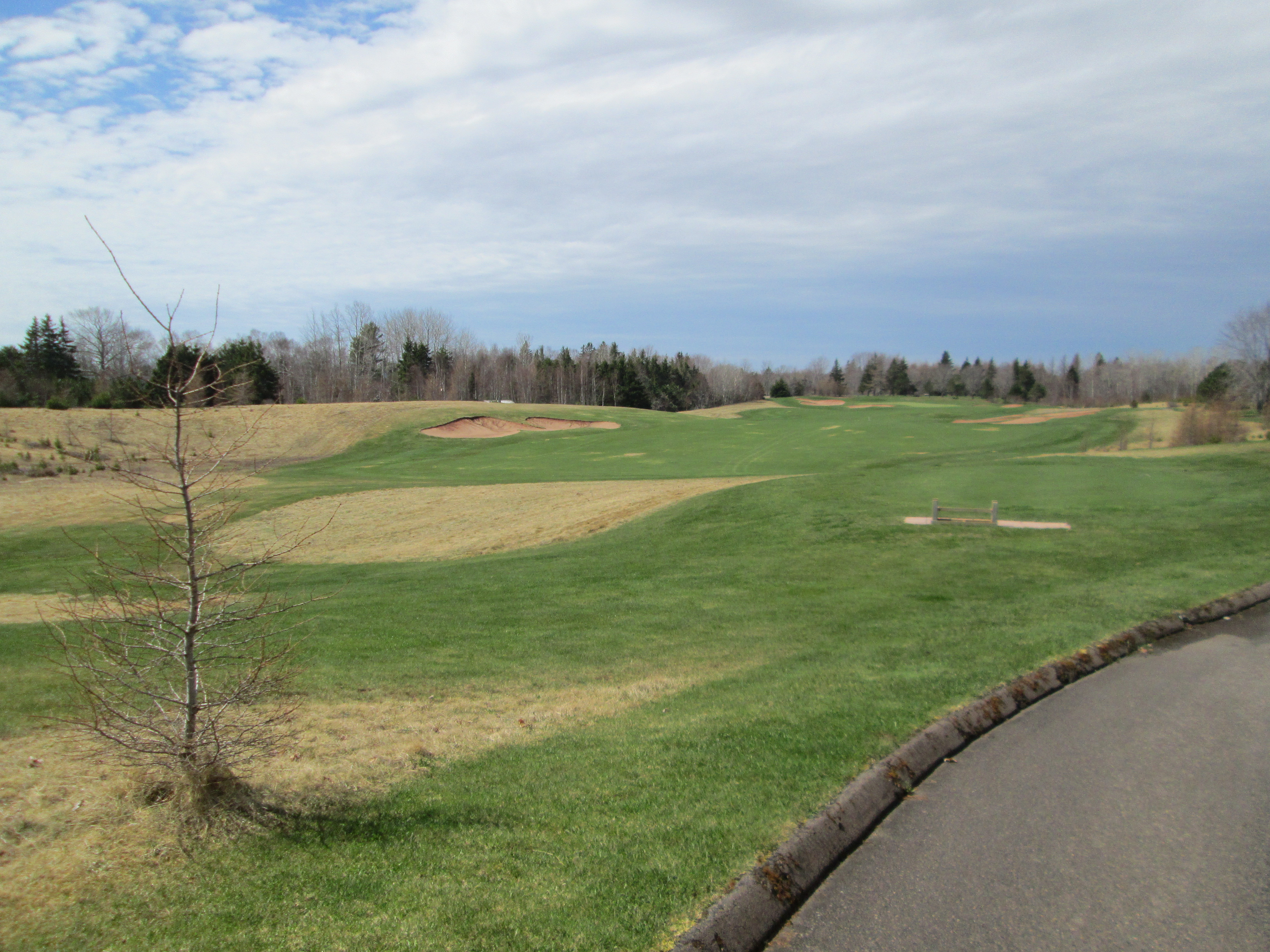

- Location within Prince Edward Island
- 46°12′31″N 62°36′20″W

Club information
- Location: Brudenell, Prince Edward Island
- Established: 1999
- Type: Public
- Owner: Province of Prince Edward Island
- Tota holes: 18
- Website: https://peisfinestgolf.com/dundarave/
- Designed by: Dr. Michael Hurdzan and Dana Fry
- Par: 72
- Length: 7089
- Course rating: 76.2
- Slope rating: 139

Dundarave Golf Course is a public golf course located in Brudenell, Prince Edward Island. The red sandstone based course was designed by two architects, Dr. Michael Hurdzan and Dana Fry, and opened July 15, 1999. Dundarave has hosted golfers Jack Nicklaus and Tom Watson during the 2006 Making the Connection - Legends of Golf event. Dunadrave Golf Course shares the practice grounds and clubhouse with its sister course Brudenell River Golf Course.

== History ==
Dundarave Golf Course opened on July 15, 1999 after being delayed for about a month. The delay in opening of the course was a result of the dry weather which caused the grass to grow slower than expected. The course was designed by two different award-winning architects, Dr. Michael Hurdzan and Dana Fry. It was designed as an expansion to the Brudenell River Resort and is intertwined throughout its sister course Brudenell River Golf Course.

In 2007, the provincial government began looking to sell the Dundarave Golf course, along with the other three courses it owns. The reasoning behind the decision was the large expenditure of taxpayer money on course maintenance; losses from the four courses totaled $858,900 in the 2014-2015 golf season. Tourism Minister Robert Henderson was quoted saying "Obviously, when you’re on the floor of the estimates [committee] … and you’re saying you invested in this stuff, sometimes comments get made that maybe that would have been better spent on an X-ray machine or books," in relation to the government's decision to sell the courses. As of the 2015 golf season, no sale had been completed and the course is still maintained by the provincial government.

== Course ==
The course is an eighteen-hole championship golf course that is located on the Brudenell River. Dundarave Golf Course is among the top courses on Prince Edward Island, it has been rated among the best golf courses in Canada and has been rated 4 1/2 stars by SCORE Golf. It was designed to exhibit the uniqueness of Prince Edward Island's red sandstone and has a particular bunker pattern containing 120 different red sand bunkers. The fairways on this course tend to be wide, while the holes snake through the woods and along the Brudenell River.

== Events ==
=== Making the Connection - Legends of Golf ===
In 2006 Dundarave golf course hosted the Making the Connection - Legends of Golf, an event created by IMG Canada and Tourism PEI in conjunction with The Heart and Stroke Foundation of Canada to raise awareness of high cholesterol and the risk of heart disease and stroke. The event took place on June 19-20th and featured a playoff between legends of golf Jack Nicklaus and Tom Watson, along with a long drive exhibition by Jason Zuback. The event was broadcast both nationally and internationally and was commentated by PGA colour commentator David Feherty and PEI golfer Lorie Kane.

=== 2016 P.E.I. Amateur Golf Championship ===
In July 2016 Dundarave Golf Course hosted the 2016 P.E.I. Amateur Golf Championship. The tournament was a three-round event with handicap divisions for both men and women, with the winners of tournament being the players to represent PEI at the Atlantic Golf Championship.

== Scorecard ==
Dundarave
Tee	Rating/Slope	1	2	3	4	5	6	7	8	9	Out	10	11	12	13	14	15	16	17	18	In	Total
Black	M-76.2/139	388	538	462	558	162	420	228	384	421	3561	499	410	456	446	208	457	325	205	522	3528	7089
Gold	M-74.3/135	364	510	442	536	141	403	205	351	342	3294	465	372	435	416	192	433	292	204	503	3312	6606
White	M-71/132	327	469	374	506	124	366	161	324	314	3009	429	350	352	364	158	415	271	174	468	3019	6028
Green	L-67.9/121	293	454	330	457	111	335	120	272	289	2661	402	307	305	329	130	315	230	145	433	2596	5257
Red	L-64.9/112	270	398	330	420	97	305	120	248	285	2446	378	281	305	299	111	283	201	124	392	2374	4820
Par		4	5	4	5	3	4	3	4	4	36	5	4	4	4	3	4	4	3	5	36	72
SI		7	15	1	13	17	5	11	9	3		16	8	2	4	12	6	10	18	14

== See also ==
- List of golf courses in Prince Edward Island
