= The Three Rivers (Prince Edward Island) =

Coordinates: 46°12′34″N 62°35′19″W

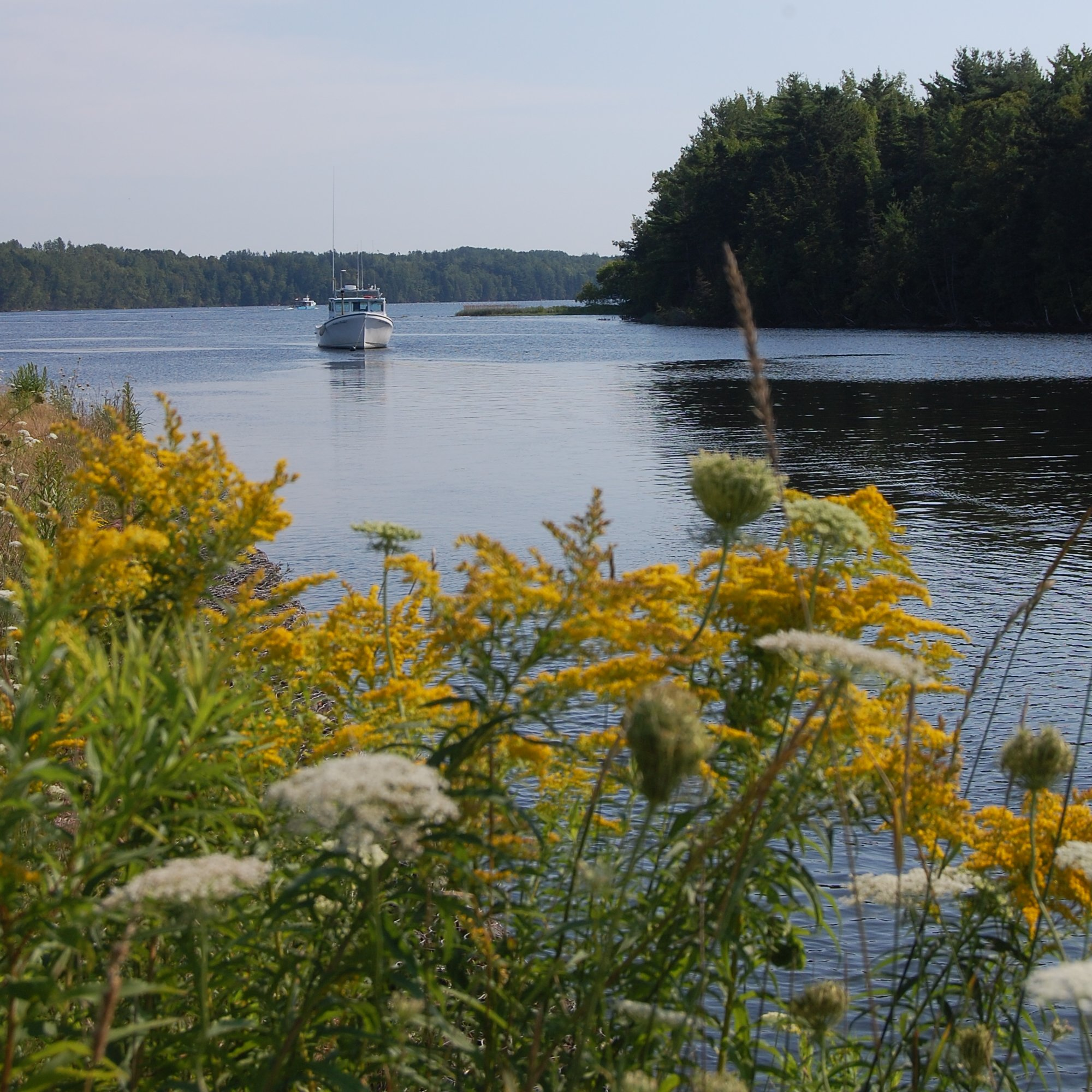
Vessel on the Cardigan River, one of the Three Rivers of eastern Prince Edward Island

The Three Rivers are the three tidal estuaries in eastern Prince Edward Island, Canada. The water bodies are the Brudenell, Cardigan and Montague rivers, which in 2004 were included on the list of outstanding Canadian Heritage Rivers. The rivers are navigable by canoe for 52 kilometres (32 mi).

There are several communities situated on the river system including Montague, Cardigan and Georgetown. The Brudenell River Provincial Park is situated on the north side of the Brudenell.

== See also ==
- List of rivers of Prince Edward Island
