= Cardigan, Prince Edward Island =

Municipality in Prince Edward Island

Coordinates: 46°14′00″N 62°37′00″W

Cardigan
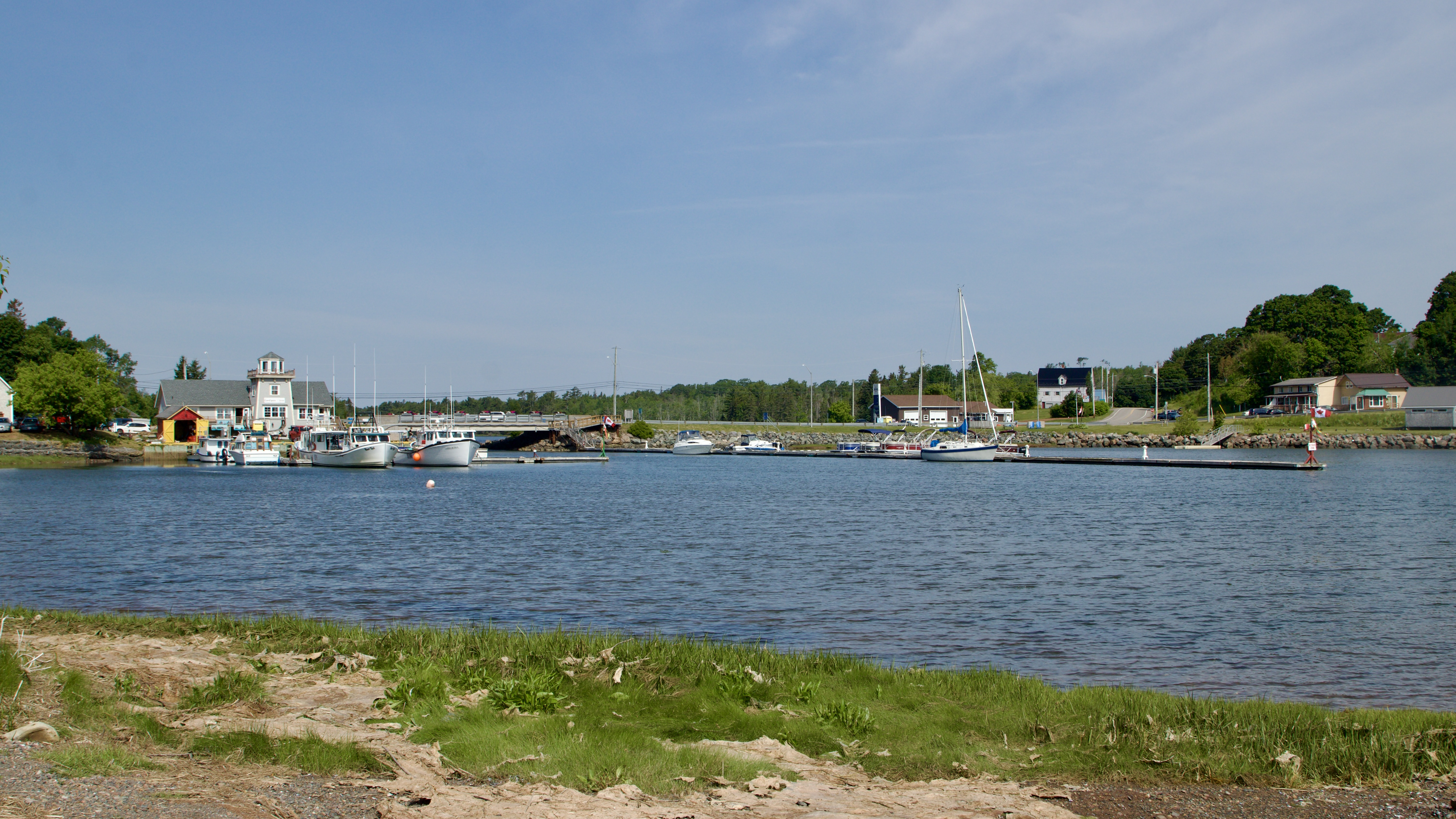
- Skyline of Cardigan, 2025
- Interactive map of Cardigan
- Country: Canada
- Province: Prince Edward Island

Area (2016)
  - Land: 5.12 km^{2} (1.98 sq mi)

Population (2021)
  - Total: 254
  - Density: 52.5/km^{2} (136/sq mi)
- Time zone: UTC−04:00 (UTC)

Cardigan (2016 pop.: 269) was a municipality that held community status in Prince Edward Island, Canada. It was a fishing community in eastern Kings County.

The community was named by Welsh farmers, later it was thought to be named after James Brudenell, 5th Earl of Cardigan, later Duke of Montague. Situated on the Cardigan River and originally named Cardigan Bridge, the community started and grew as a result of the shipbuilding industry and lumber trade.

Today the community's primary industry is manufacturing, followed by fishing, most notably lobster, mussels and clams.

The community is also home to Canada's smallest library.

On September 28, 2018, it was combined with six other municipalities and adjacent unincorporated areas to create the town of Three Rivers.

Federal census population history of Cardigan
Year	Pop.	±%
1956	218	—
1961	193	−11.5%
1966	263	+36.3%
1971	266	+1.1%
1976	313	+17.7%
1981	321	+2.6%
1986	346	+7.8%
1991	359	+3.8%
1996	371	+3.3%
2001	382	+3.0%
2006	374	−2.1%
2011	332	−11.2%
2016	269	−19.0%
2021	254	−5.6%
Source: Statistics Canada

== Attractions ==
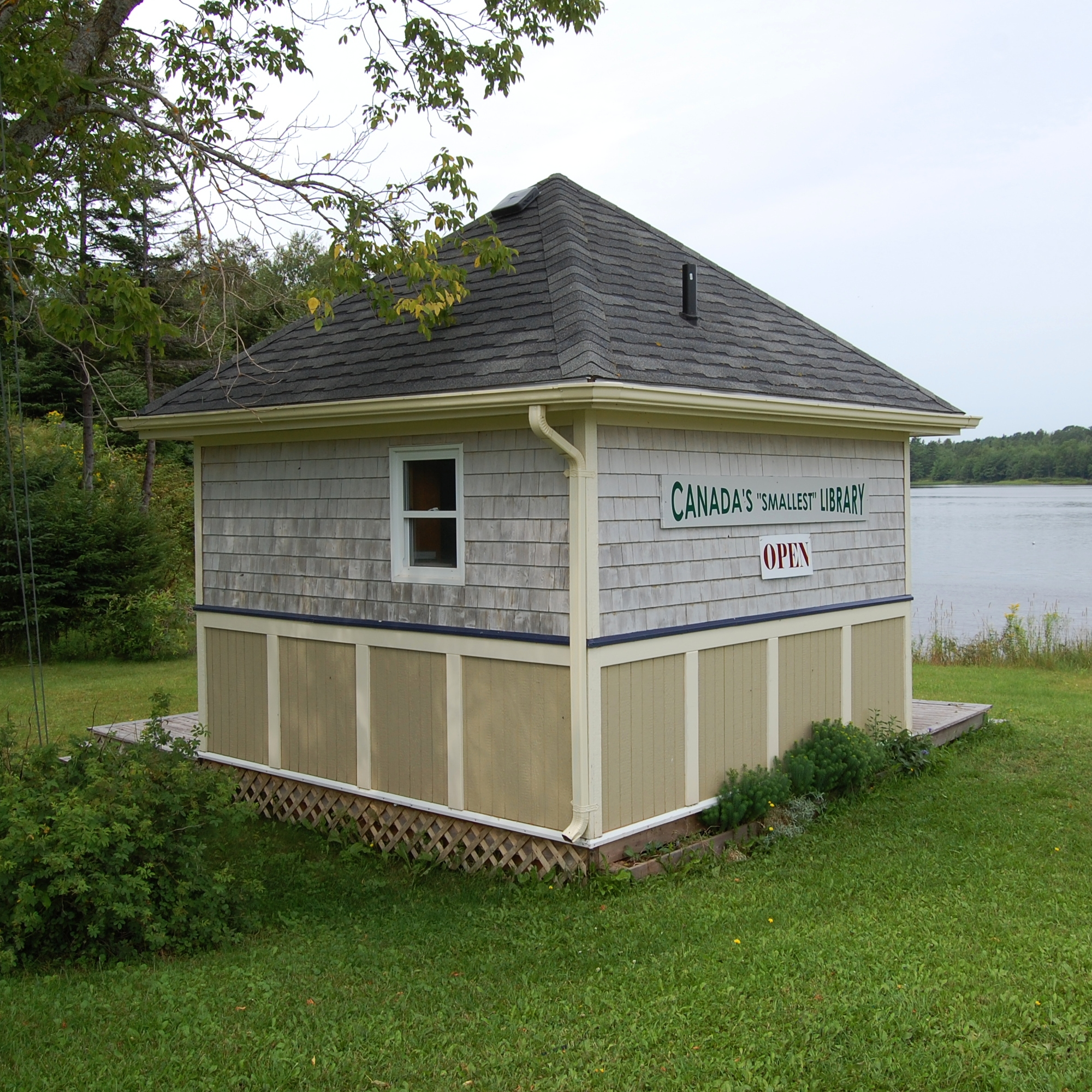
Canada's Smallest Library in Cardigan

- Canada's Smallest Library
- Cardigan River Heritage Centre
- Shipbuilding Museum
- Cardigan Marina
- Cardigan ball fields
