= Brudenell, Prince Edward Island =

Municipality in Prince Edward Island

Coordinates: 46°11′35″N 62°38′19″W

Brudenell (/ˈbruːdənɛl/ BROO-də-nel) was a municipality that held community status in Prince Edward Island, Canada. It was located along the Brudenell and Montague rivers.

Brudenell Point, located at the confluence of the two rivers, was the site of the Jean Pierre Roma Acadian settlement in the 18th century, the first here by French colonists. This small portion of Brudenell is now a National Historic Site of Canada called Roma Three Rivers. This French settlement built several significant roads on the island (which they called Isle St. Jean). These are still used today. After taking control of this territory from the French after the Seven Years' War, the English burned the settlement to the ground.

Later that same piece of land was resettled, mostly by ethnic British. In 1829 Andrew Archibald Macdonald was born here, later considered the "Father of Confederation" in Canada.

On September 28, 2018, Brudenell was merged with six other municipalities and adjacent unincorporated areas to form the town of Three Rivers.
