= U Sports curling championships =

Canadian university sports tournament

U Sports/Curling Canada University Curling Championships
- Established: 2008
- 2026 host city: Regina, Saskatchewan
- 2026 arena: Callie Curling Club

Current champions (2026)
- Men: (Alberta) Calgary Dinos
- Women: (Newfoundland and Labrador) Memorial Sea-Hawks

Current edition
- 2026 U Sports/Curling Canada University Curling Championships

The U Sports Curling Championships is a Canadian university curling tournament conducted by U Sports, to determine a national champion. The tournament involves the champions from each of Canada's four regional sports conferences. The event is sanctioned and held in association with Curling Canada.

== Results ==
Year	Men's champion	Team	Women's champion	Team	Host
2008	(Ontario) Wilfrid Laurier Golden Hawks	Mike Anderson, Bill Francis, Paul Arkilander, Matthew Mapletoft	(Ontario) Wilfrid Laurier Golden Hawks	Hollie Nicol, Danielle Inglis, Laura Hickey, Hilary McDermott, Erica Butler	Waterloo, Ontario (University of Waterloo)
2009	(Saskatchewan) Regina Cougars	Chris Busby, Jason Obst, Justin Mihalicz, Brad Wallin	(Ontario) Wilfrid Laurier Golden Hawks	Hollie Nicol, Danielle Inglis, Laura Hickey, Hilary McDermott	Montreal, Quebec
2010	(Ontario) Queen's Gaels	Jonathan Beuk, Andrew Inouye, Chadd Vandermade, Scott Chadwick	(Saskatchewan) Regina Cougars	Brooklyn Lemon, Chelsey Peterson, Ashley Green, Nicole Lang	Edmonton, Alberta (University of Alberta)
2011	(Newfoundland and Labrador) Memorial Sea-Hawks	Colin Thomas, Cory Schuh, Chris Ford, Spencer Wicks	(Ontario) Wilfrid Laurier Golden Hawks	Laura Crocker, Sarah Wilkes, Jen Gates, Cheryl Kreviazuk	St. John's, Newfoundland and Labrador (Memorial University)
2012	Alberta Golden Bears	Brendan Bottcher, Mick Lizmore, Brad Thiessen, Karrick Martin, Parker Konschuh	(Ontario) Wilfrid Laurier Golden Hawks	Laura Crocker, Sarah Wilkes, Jen Gates, Pamela Feldkamp, Cheryl Kreviazuk	Welland, Ontario (Brock University)
2013	(Ontario) Waterloo Warriors	Jake Walker, Edward Cyr, Jordan Moreau, James Freeman, Nathan Ransom	Manitoba Bisons	Breanne Meakin, Ashley Howard, Selena Kaatz, Krysten Karwacki	Kamloops, British Columbia (Thompson Rivers University)
2014	Manitoba Bisons	Matt Dunstone, Dan Grant, Chris Gallant, Jim Coleman, Jordan Smith	(Ontario) Carleton Ravens	Jamie Sinclair, Lauren Horton, Lynn Kreviazuk, Jessica Armstrong, Sarah Armstrong	Regina, Saskatchewan (University of Regina)
2015	Alberta Golden Bears	Thomas Scoffin, Evan Asmussen, Jason Ginter, Andrew O’Dell, Brayden Power	Alberta Pandas	Kelsey Rocque, Taylor McDonald, Claire Tully, Alison Kotylak, Taylore Theroux	Waterloo, Ontario (Wilfrid Laurier University)
2016	(Ontario) Wilfrid Laurier Golden Hawks	Aaron Squires, Richard Krell, Spencer Nuttall, Fraser Reid, Russell Cuddie	Alberta Pandas	Kelsey Rocque, Danielle Schmiemann, Taylor McDonald, Taylore Theroux, Kristen Streifel	Kelowna, British Columbia (UBC Okanagan)
2017	(Newfoundland and Labrador) Memorial Sea-Hawks	Adam Boland, Stephen Trickett, Zach Young, Evan Kearley	(Ontario) Laurentian Voyageurs	Krysta Burns, Megan Smith, Sara Guy, Laura Masters	Thunder Bay, Ontario (Lakehead University)
2018	Alberta Golden Bears	Karsten Sturmay, Tristan Steinke, Jason Ginter, Chris Kennedy	Alberta Pandas	Kristen Streifel, Danielle Schmiemann, Selena Sturmay, Jesse Iles	Leduc, Alberta (University of Alberta)
2019	(Ontario) Carleton Ravens	Cameron Goodkey, Mackenzie Calwell, Morgan Calwell, Brendan Acorn	(Ontario) Laurentian Voyageurs	Kira Brunton, Megan Smith, Alyssa Denyer, Emma Johnson, Mikaela Cheslock	Fredericton, New Brunswick (University of New Brunswick)
2020	(Ontario) Wilfrid Laurier Golden Hawks	Matthew Hall, John Willsey, Jordie Lyon-Hatcher, Graham Singer, Adam Vincent	Alberta Pandas	Selena Sturmay, Abby Marks, Kate Goodhelpsen, Paige Papley, Catherine Clifford	Portage la Prairie, Manitoba
2021	Cancelled due to COVID-19 (coronavirus) pandemic				
2022	Cancelled due to COVID-19 (coronavirus) pandemic				
2023	(Ontario) Wilfrid Laurier Golden Hawks	Sam Mooibroek, Kibo Mulima, Wyatt Small, Ben Pearce, Codie Harris	Alberta Pandas	Serena Gray-Withers, Catherine Clifford, Brianna Cullen, Zoe Cinnamon, Gracelyn Richards	Sudbury, Ontario (Laurentian University)
2024	(Saskatchewan) Regina Cougars	Josh Bryden, Adam Bukurak, Carter Williamson, Ryan Grabarczyk, Ayden Wittmire	Alberta Pandas	Serena Gray-Withers, Catherine Clifford, Brianna Cullen, Zoe Cinnamon	Fredericton, New Brunswick (University of New Brunswick)
2025	(Ontario) Wilfrid Laurier Golden Hawks	Kibo Mulima, Wyatt Small, Wyatt Wright, Nathan Kim, Adam Moor	(Ontario) Wilfrid Laurier Golden Hawks	Emma Artichuk, Sarah Bailey, Scotia Maltman, Tori Zemmelink, Logan Shaw	Lethbridge, Alberta (University of Lethbridge)
2026	(Alberta) Calgary Dinos	Kenan Wipf, Ky Macaulay, Ethan Drysdale, Spencer Else	(Newfoundland and Labrador) Memorial Sea-Hawks	Cailey Locke, Hayley Gushue, Emily Neary, Sitaye Penney	Regina, Saskatchewan (University of Regina)

== See also ==
- Atlantic University Sport Curling Championships
