= 2025 Atlantic University Sport Curling Championships =

2025 AUS Curling Championships presented by Bell
- Host city: Halifax, Nova Scotia
- Arena: Mayflower Curling Club
- Dates: January 2–5
- Men's winner: (Newfoundland and Labrador) Memorial Sea-Hawks
- Curling club: St. John's CC, St. John's
- Skip: Simon Perry
- Third: Nicholas Codner
- Second: Brayden Snow
- Lead: Sean O'Leary
- Coach: Glen Goss
- Finalist: (New Brunswick) UNB Reds (Stewart)
- Women's winner: (Nova Scotia) Dalhousie Tigers
- Curling club: Halifax CC, Halifax
- Skip: Allyson MacNutt
- Third: Rebecca Regan
- Second: Grace McCusker
- Lead: Cate Fitzgerald
- Alternate: Cally Moore
- Coach: Mary Mattatall
- Finalist: (Nova Scotia) St. Francis Xavier X-Women (Rafuse)

The 2025 Atlantic University Sport Curling Championships presented by Bell were held from January 2 to 5 at the Mayflower Curling Club in Halifax, Nova Scotia. The top two men's and women's teams qualified for the 2025 U Sports/Curling Canada University Curling Championships in Lethbridge, Alberta. The event was hosted by Saint Mary's University.

In the men's final, the Memorial Sea-Hawks won their second AUS title, stealing a 6–5 victory from the UNB Reds. It was a second title for Memorial University of Newfoundland who last won the title eight years prior in 2017. The win also snapped a six-year title streak from the Dalhousie Tigers who missed the playoffs in a shocking result.

In the women's final, the Dalhousie Tigers reclaimed the championship title by downing the St. Francis Xavier X-Women 7–2 in the final. The Tigers previously won four straight AUS titles before losing the final in 2024. The reigning champions, the UNB Reds, lost in the semifinal to Dalhousie.

== Men ==
=== Teams ===
The teams are listed as follows:

Team	Skip	Third	Second	Lead	Alternate	University
Dalhousie Tigers	Nathan Gray	Owen McPherson	Caelan McPherson	David McCurdy	Owain Fisher	(Nova Scotia) Dalhousie University
Memorial Sea-Hawks	Simon Perry	Nicholas Codner	Brayden Snow	Sean O'Leary		(Newfoundland and Labrador) Memorial University of Newfoundland
Saint Mary's Huskies	Tye Dacey (Fourth)	Sean Flemming (Skip)		Evyn Tibbetts		(Nova Scotia) Saint Mary's University
St. Francis Xavier X-Men	Logan Pugsley	Sam Goodine	Brett Carter	Wyatt Schofield	Andrew Roberts	(Nova Scotia) St. Francis Xavier University
UNB Reds	Jamie Stewart	Sean Beland	Aden Kavanaugh	Loris Elliott	Luke Robichaud	University of New Brunswick
UPEI Panthers	Chase MacMillan (Fourth)	Jack MacFadyen (Skip)	Luke Butler	Liam Kelly		University of Prince Edward Island

=== Round robin standings ===
Final Round Robin Standings

Key
Teams to Playoffs

Team	Skip	W	L	PF	PA	EW	EL	BE	SE
(Newfoundland and Labrador) Memorial Sea-Hawks	Simon Perry	4	1	31	18	21	12	0	12
(New Brunswick) UNB Reds	Jamie Stewart	4	1	31	15	19	13	2	9
(Prince Edward Island) UPEI Panthers	Jack MacFadyen	3	2	22	27	14	15	1	6
(Nova Scotia) Dalhousie Tigers	Nathan Gray	3	2	34	22	16	15	2	6
(Nova Scotia) Saint Mary's Huskies	Sean Flemming	1	4	18	36	11	20	1	3
(Nova Scotia) St. Francis Xavier X-Men	Logan Pugsley	0	5	16	34	13	19	3	3

=== Round robin results ===
All draw times are listed in Atlantic Time (UTC−03:00).

==== Draw 1 ====
Thursday, January 2, 2:00 pm

Sheet 4	1	2	3	4	5	6	7	8	Final
(Newfoundland and Labrador) Memorial Sea-Hawks (Perry)	2	1	1	0	2	1	0	X	7
(Nova Scotia) St. Francis Xavier X-Men (Pugsley)	0	0	0	2	0	0	2	X	4

Sheet 5	1	2	3	4	5	6	7	8	9	Final
(Prince Edward Island) UPEI Panthers (MacFadyen)	3	0	0	3	0	0	0	1	1	8
(Nova Scotia) Dalhousie Tigers (Gray)	0	0	4	0	0	2	1	0	0	7

Sheet 6	1	2	3	4	5	6	7	8	Final
(New Brunswick) UNB Reds (Stewart)	1	4	0	2	2	1	X	X	10
(Nova Scotia) Saint Mary's Huskies (Flemming)	0	0	2	0	0	0	X	X	2

==== Draw 2 ====
Friday, January 3, 9:00 am

Sheet 1	1	2	3	4	5	6	7	8	Final
(Nova Scotia) Dalhousie Tigers (Gray)	1	1	1	2	0	2	X	X	7
(Newfoundland and Labrador) Memorial Sea-Hawks (Perry)	0	0	0	0	2	0	X	X	2

Sheet 2	1	2	3	4	5	6	7	8	Final
(Nova Scotia) Saint Mary's Huskies (Flemming)	1	1	0	0	2	0	4	X	8
(Nova Scotia) St. Francis Xavier X-Men (Pugsley)	0	0	1	1	0	2	0	X	4

Sheet 3	1	2	3	4	5	6	7	8	Final
(New Brunswick) UNB Reds (Stewart)	0	1	0	1	0	2	1	X	5
(Prince Edward Island) UPEI Panthers (MacFadyen)	0	0	1	0	1	0	0	X	2

==== Draw 3 ====
Friday, January 3, 2:00 pm

Sheet 4	1	2	3	4	5	6	7	8	Final
(Prince Edward Island) UPEI Panthers (MacFadyen)	0	1	1	2	0	3	X	X	7
(Nova Scotia) Saint Mary's Huskies (Flemming)	0	0	0	0	2	0	X	X	2

Sheet 5	1	2	3	4	5	6	7	8	Final
(Newfoundland and Labrador) Memorial Sea-Hawks (Perry)	0	2	1	0	1	1	1	X	6
(New Brunswick) UNB Reds (Stewart)	1	0	0	2	0	0	0	X	3

Sheet 6	1	2	3	4	5	6	7	8	Final
(Nova Scotia) St. Francis Xavier X-Men (Pugsley)	0	1	0	1	1	0	1	X	4
(Nova Scotia) Dalhousie Tigers (Gray)	0	0	6	0	0	1	0	X	7

==== Draw 4 ====
Saturday, January 4, 9:00 am

Sheet 1	1	2	3	4	5	6	7	8	Final
(Nova Scotia) St. Francis Xavier X-Men (Pugsley)	0	0	0	1	0	1	0	X	2
(New Brunswick) UNB Reds (Stewart)	2	0	1	0	1	0	3	X	7

Sheet 2	1	2	3	4	5	6	7	8	Final
(Newfoundland and Labrador) Memorial Sea-Hawks (Perry)	2	1	3	2	3	X	X	X	11
(Prince Edward Island) UPEI Panthers (MacFadyen)	0	0	0	0	0	X	X	X	0

Sheet 3	1	2	3	4	5	6	7	8	Final
(Nova Scotia) Saint Mary's Huskies (Flemming)	0	0	1	0	1	0	X	X	2
(Nova Scotia) Dalhousie Tigers (Gray)	2	0	0	1	0	7	X	X	10

==== Draw 5 ====
Saturday, January 4, 2:00 pm

Sheet 4	1	2	3	4	5	6	7	8	Final
(Nova Scotia) Dalhousie Tigers (Gray)	0	1	0	1	0	1	0	0	3
(New Brunswick) UNB Reds (Stewart)	0	0	3	0	1	0	1	1	6

Sheet 5	1	2	3	4	5	6	7	8	Final
(Nova Scotia) St. Francis Xavier X-Men (Pugsley)	0	0	0	0	1	1	0	X	2
(Prince Edward Island) UPEI Panthers (MacFadyen)	1	2	1	0	0	0	1	X	5

Sheet 6	1	2	3	4	5	6	7	8	Final
(Nova Scotia) Saint Mary's Huskies (Flemming)	0	1	1	0	0	0	2	0	4
(Newfoundland and Labrador) Memorial Sea-Hawks (Perry)	1	0	0	1	1	1	0	1	5

=== Playoffs ===
Semifinal			Final
			1	(Newfoundland and Labrador) Memorial Sea-Hawks	6
2	(New Brunswick) UNB Reds	6	2	(New Brunswick) UNB Reds	5
3	(Prince Edward Island) UPEI Panthers	4

==== Semifinal ====
Sunday, January 5, 9:00 am

Sheet 3	1	2	3	4	5	6	7	8	Final
(New Brunswick) UNB Reds (Stewart)	0	2	0	0	1	1	1	1	6
(Prince Edward Island) UPEI Panthers (MacFadyen)	0	0	2	2	0	0	0	0	4

==== Final ====
Sunday, January 5, 2:00 pm

Sheet 4	1	2	3	4	5	6	7	8	Final
(Newfoundland and Labrador) Memorial Sea-Hawks (Perry)	2	0	0	0	0	2	1	1	6
(New Brunswick) UNB Reds (Stewart)	0	0	2	2	1	0	0	0	5

== Women ==
=== Teams ===
The teams are listed as follows:

Team	Skip	Third	Second	Lead	Alternate	University
Dalhousie Tigers	Allyson MacNutt	Rebecca Regan	Grace McCusker	Cate Fitzgerald	Cally Moore	(Nova Scotia) Dalhousie University
Mount Allison Mounties	Olivia Wynter	Mya Pugsley	Lauren Guayder	Emma Gould	Molly Jones	(New Brunswick) Mount Allison University
Saint Mary's Huskies	Abby Slauenwhite	Ella Wilson			Emma Butler	(Nova Scotia) Saint Mary's University
St. Francis Xavier X-Women	Abby Rafuse	Deidra Fraser	Natalie MacKinnon	Ace MacDonald	Hanna Manthorne	(Nova Scotia) St. Francis Xavier University
UNB Reds	Jenna Campbell	Carly A. Smith	Carly L. Smith	Rebecca Watson	Kirsten Donovan	University of New Brunswick

=== Round robin standings ===
Final Round Robin Standings

Key
Teams to Playoffs

Team	Skip	W	L	PF	PA	EW	EL	BE	SE
(Nova Scotia) St. Francis Xavier X-Women	Abby Rafuse	3	1	34	16	15	11	3	7
(Nova Scotia) Dalhousie Tigers	Allyson MacNutt	3	1	25	19	15	11	0	5
(New Brunswick) UNB Reds	Jenna Campbell	3	1	34	16	16	11	0	6
(New Brunswick) Mount Allison Mounties	Olivia Wynter	1	3	16	34	10	16	1	5
(Nova Scotia) Saint Mary's Huskies	Abby Slauenwhite	0	4	15	39	10	17	0	3

=== Round robin results ===
All draw times are listed in Atlantic Time (UTC−03:00).

==== Draw 1 ====
Thursday, January 2, 2:00 pm

Sheet 2	1	2	3	4	5	6	7	8	Final
(Nova Scotia) St. Francis Xavier X-Women (Rafuse)	0	0	0	4	1	3	2	X	10
(New Brunswick) Mount Allison Mounties (Wynter)	0	2	2	0	0	0	0	X	4

Sheet 3	1	2	3	4	5	6	7	8	Final
(New Brunswick) UNB Reds (Campbell)	2	3	0	2	3	2	X	X	12
(Nova Scotia) Saint Mary's Huskies (Slauenwhite)	0	0	1	0	0	0	X	X	1

==== Draw 2 ====
Friday, January 3, 9:00 am

Sheet 4	1	2	3	4	5	6	7	8	Final
(New Brunswick) Mount Allison Mounties (Wynter)	0	0	0	0	1	0	0	X	1
(Nova Scotia) Dalhousie Tigers (MacNutt)	1	0	1	3	0	1	1	X	7

Sheet 5	1	2	3	4	5	6	7	8	Final
(Nova Scotia) Saint Mary's Huskies (Slauenwhite)	0	0	0	1	1	1	0	X	3
(Nova Scotia) St. Francis Xavier X-Women (Rafuse)	2	2	1	0	0	0	4	X	9

==== Draw 3 ====
Friday, January 3, 2:00 pm

Sheet 2	1	2	3	4	5	6	7	8	Final
(New Brunswick) Mount Allison Mounties (Wynter)	0	0	2	0	1	0	X	X	3
(New Brunswick) UNB Reds (Campbell)	3	2	0	2	0	3	X	X	10

Sheet 3	1	2	3	4	5	6	7	8	Final
(Nova Scotia) Dalhousie Tigers (MacNutt)	0	0	0	1	1	0	0	X	2
(Nova Scotia) St. Francis Xavier X-Women (Rafuse)	0	2	3	0	0	1	3	X	9

==== Draw 4 ====
Saturday, January 4, 9:00 am

Sheet 4	1	2	3	4	5	6	7	8	Final
(Nova Scotia) St. Francis Xavier X-Women (Rafuse)	0	0	1	0	0	3	0	2	6
(New Brunswick) UNB Reds (Campbell)	0	2	0	1	3	0	1	0	7

Sheet 5	1	2	3	4	5	6	7	8	Final
(Nova Scotia) Dalhousie Tigers (MacNutt)	6	0	2	0	2	0	X	X	10
(Nova Scotia) Saint Mary's Huskies (Slauenwhite)	0	1	0	2	0	1	X	X	4

==== Draw 5 ====
Saturday, January 4, 2:00 pm

Sheet 2	1	2	3	4	5	6	7	8	Final
(New Brunswick) UNB Reds (Campbell)	0	1	0	2	0	0	2	0	5
(Nova Scotia) Dalhousie Tigers (MacNutt)	1	0	1	0	1	2	0	1	6

Sheet 3	1	2	3	4	5	6	7	8	Final
(Nova Scotia) Saint Mary's Huskies (Slauenwhite)	3	0	0	0	0	2	2	0	7
(New Brunswick) Mount Allison Mounties (Wynter)	0	1	1	1	2	0	0	3	8

=== Playoffs ===
Semifinal			Final
			1	(Nova Scotia) St. Francis Xavier X-Women	2
2	(Nova Scotia) Dalhousie Tigers	6	2	(Nova Scotia) Dalhousie Tigers	7
3	(New Brunswick) UNB Reds	4

==== Semifinal ====
Sunday, January 5, 9:00 am

Sheet 4	1	2	3	4	5	6	7	8	Final
(Nova Scotia) Dalhousie Tigers (MacNutt)	0	0	2	0	0	3	0	1	6
(New Brunswick) UNB Reds (Campbell)	0	1	0	1	1	0	1	0	4

==== Final ====
Sunday, January 5, 2:00 pm

Sheet 3	1	2	3	4	5	6	7	8	Final
(Nova Scotia) St. Francis Xavier X-Women (Rafuse)	0	0	0	2	0	0	0	X	2
(Nova Scotia) Dalhousie Tigers (MacNutt)	0	3	1	0	1	1	1	X	7
