= Atlantic University Sport Curling Championships =

- Established: 2015
- 2026 host city: Fredericton, New Brunswick
- 2026 arena: Capital Winter Club

Current champions (2026)
- Men: (Newfoundland and Labrador) Memorial Sea-Hawks
- Women: (Newfoundland and Labrador) Memorial Sea-Hawks

The Atlantic University Sport Curling Championships are an annual curling tournament held between club curling teams from member schools. Depending on the year, the top two or three men's and women's team qualify for the U Sports curling championships.

The inaugural event was held in 2015 and was hosted in Montague, Prince Edward Island by the University of Prince Edward Island. Since then, the championship has been held annually, excluding the 2020–21 season when it was cancelled due to the COVID-19 pandemic.

The Dalhousie Tigers have dominated the event on both the men's and women's sides. The men's team have won seven of the eleven titles while the women's team have picked up six. The only other men's teams to have won the AUS championship are the UNB Reds and the Memorial Sea-Hawks while on the women's side, the Saint Mary's Huskies, St. Francis Xavier X-Women, Mount Allison Mounties, UNB Reds and Memorial Sea-Hawks have each won one title.

== Champions ==
Year	Men's champion	Women's champion	Host
2015	(New Brunswick) UNB Reds	(Nova Scotia) Saint Mary's Huskies	Montague CC, Montague ( University of Prince Edward Island)
2016	(Nova Scotia) Dalhousie Tigers	(Nova Scotia) Dalhousie Tigers	Highlander CC, St. Andrews ( (Nova Scotia) St. Francis Xavier University)
2017	(Newfoundland and Labrador) Memorial Sea-Hawks	(Nova Scotia) St. Francis Xavier X-Women	Truro CC, Truro (AUS)
2018	(Nova Scotia) Dalhousie Tigers	(New Brunswick) Mount Allison Mounties	Capital WC, Fredericton ( University of New Brunswick)
2019	(Nova Scotia) Dalhousie Tigers	(Nova Scotia) Dalhousie Tigers	St. John's CC, St. John's ( (Newfoundland and Labrador) Memorial University of Newfoundland)
2020	(Nova Scotia) Dalhousie Tigers	(Nova Scotia) Dalhousie Tigers	CFB Halifax CC, Halifax ( (Nova Scotia) Saint Mary's University)
2021	Cancelled due to the COVID-19 pandemic.		
2022	(Nova Scotia) Dalhousie Tigers	(Nova Scotia) Dalhousie Tigers	Windsor CC, Windsor ( (Nova Scotia) Saint Mary's University)
2023	(Nova Scotia) Dalhousie Tigers	(Nova Scotia) Dalhousie Tigers	Capital WC, Fredericton ( University of New Brunswick)
2024	(Nova Scotia) Dalhousie Tigers	(New Brunswick) UNB Reds	Montague CC, Montague ( University of Prince Edward Island)
2025	(Newfoundland and Labrador) Memorial Sea-Hawks	(Nova Scotia) Dalhousie Tigers	Mayflower CC, Halifax ( (Nova Scotia) Saint Mary's University)
2026	(Newfoundland and Labrador) Memorial Sea-Hawks	(Newfoundland and Labrador) Memorial Sea-Hawks	Capital WC, Fredericton ( University of New Brunswick)
