= 2024 Atlantic University Sport Curling Championships =

2024 AUS Curling Championships presented by Bell
- Host city: Montague, Prince Edward Island
- Arena: Montague Curling Club
- Dates: February 8–11
- Men's winner: (Nova Scotia) Dalhousie Tigers
- Curling club: Halifax CC, Halifax
- Skip: Owen Purcell
- Third: Ethan Young
- Second: David McCurdy
- Lead: Caelan McPherson
- Alternate: Owen McPherson
- Coach: Anthony Purcell
- Finalist: (Nova Scotia) Saint Mary's Huskies (Mosher)
- Women's winner: (New Brunswick) UNB Reds
- Curling club: Capital WC, Fredericton
- Skip: Jenna Campbell
- Third: Carly Smith
- Second: Véronique Carroll
- Lead: Rebecca Watson
- Alternate: Kirsten Donovan
- Coach: Wayne Tallon
- Finalist: (Nova Scotia) Dalhousie Tigers (MacNutt)

The 2024 Atlantic University Sport Curling Championships presented by Bell were held from February 8 to 11 at the Montague Curling Club in Montague, Prince Edward Island. The top two men's and women's teams qualified for the 2024 U Sports/Curling Canada University Curling Championships in Fredericton, New Brunswick, hosted by the University of New Brunswick who received an automatic berth as the hosts. Because the UNB Reds women's team qualified for the final, a third-place game was held to determine the second qualifying team.

In the men's final, the Dalhousie Tigers won their seventh AUS title by defeating the Saint Mary's Huskies 8–5. As the UNB men's team lost the semifinal, no third-place game was held. Both Dalhousie and Saint Mary's qualified for U Sports.

In the women's final, the UNB Reds won their first AUS championship, defeating the defending champions Dalhousie Tigers 5–4 in an extra end. The third-place game saw the Mount Allison Mounties steal in a double extra end to down the Saint Mary's Huskies 8–7. Both Dalhousie and Mount Allison qualified for the U Sport championship.

== Men ==
=== Teams ===
The teams are listed as follows:

Team	Skip	Third	Second	Lead	Alternate	University
Dalhousie Tigers	Owen Purcell	Ethan Young	David McCurdy	Caelan McPherson	Owen McPherson	(Nova Scotia) Dalhousie University
Saint Mary's Huskies	Nick Mosher	Benjamin Currie	Chris Churchill	Craig Weagle		(Nova Scotia) Saint Mary's University
St. Francis Xavier X-Men	Logan Pugsley	Ryan Smith	Sam Goodine	Andrew Roberts	Wyatt Schofield	(Nova Scotia) St. Francis Xavier University
UNB Reds	Jamie Stewart	Sean Beland	James Carr	Loris Elliott	Luke Wilson	University of New Brunswick
UPEI Panthers	Jack MacFadyen	Chase MacMillan	Liam Kelly	Robert Shaw		University of Prince Edward Island

=== Round robin standings ===
Final Round Robin Standings

Key
Teams to Playoffs

Team	Skip	W	L	PF	PA	EW	EL	BE	SE
(Nova Scotia) Dalhousie Tigers	Owen Purcell	3	1	26	13	15	8	0	10
(Nova Scotia) Saint Mary's Huskies	Nick Mosher	3	1	21	19	13	10	3	5
(New Brunswick) UNB Reds	Jamie Stewart	2	2	21	18	11	12	3	5
(Nova Scotia) St. Francis Xavier X-Men	Logan Pugsley	1	3	14	22	10	14	2	4
(Prince Edward Island) UPEI Panthers	Jack MacFadyen	1	3	15	25	9	14	1	3

=== Round robin results ===
All draw times are listed in Atlantic Time (UTC−03:00).

==== Draw 1 ====
Thursday, February 8, 9:00 am

Sheet 3	1	2	3	4	5	6	7	8	Final
(Nova Scotia) Dalhousie Tigers (Purcell)	1	1	0	0	0	0	X	X	2
(New Brunswick) UNB Reds (Stewart)	0	0	3	1	1	2	X	X	7

==== Draw 2 ====
Thursday, February 8, 2:00 pm

Sheet 4	1	2	3	4	5	6	7	8	Final
(Nova Scotia) St. Francis Xavier X-Men (Pugsley)	0	2	0	1	0	1	0	0	4
(Nova Scotia) Saint Mary's Huskies (Mosher)	1	0	1	0	0	0	1	2	5

==== Draw 3 ====
Thursday, February 8, 7:00 pm

Sheet 1	1	2	3	4	5	6	7	8	Final
(Nova Scotia) Dalhousie Tigers (Purcell)	2	1	1	0	1	2	X	X	7
(Nova Scotia) St. Francis Xavier X-Men (Pugsley)	0	0	0	1	0	0	X	X	1

Sheet 2	1	2	3	4	5	6	7	8	Final
(New Brunswick) UNB Reds (Stewart)	0	2	0	0	0	0	3	0	5
(Nova Scotia) Saint Mary's Huskies (Mosher)	0	0	2	1	1	2	0	1	7

==== Draw 4 ====
Friday, February 9, 9:00 am

Sheet 2	1	2	3	4	5	6	7	8	Final
(Nova Scotia) St. Francis Xavier X-Men (Pugsley)	2	0	2	1	1	0	2	X	8
(Prince Edward Island) UPEI Panthers (MacFadyen)	0	2	0	0	0	1	0	X	3

==== Draw 6 ====
Friday, February 9, 7:00 pm

Sheet 3	1	2	3	4	5	6	7	8	Final
(Nova Scotia) Saint Mary's Huskies (Mosher)	1	0	2	0	0	4	X	X	7
(Prince Edward Island) UPEI Panthers (MacFadyen)	0	0	0	1	0	0	X	X	1

Sheet 4	1	2	3	4	5	6	7	8	Final
(New Brunswick) UNB Reds (Stewart)	0	4	0	0	1	0	2	X	7
(Nova Scotia) St. Francis Xavier X-Men (Pugsley)	0	0	0	0	0	1	0	X	1

==== Draw 7 ====
Saturday, February 10, 9:00 am

Sheet 1	1	2	3	4	5	6	7	8	Final
(Nova Scotia) Saint Mary's Huskies (Mosher)	0	0	2	0	0	0	X	X	2
(Nova Scotia) Dalhousie Tigers (Purcell)	2	0	0	2	3	2	X	X	9

Sheet 2	1	2	3	4	5	6	7	8	Final
(Prince Edward Island) UPEI Panthers (MacFadyen)	0	3	1	0	0	2	2	X	8
(New Brunswick) UNB Reds (Stewart)	0	0	0	1	1	0	0	X	2

==== Draw 8 ====
Saturday, February 10, 2:00 pm

Sheet 4	1	2	3	4	5	6	7	8	Final
(Prince Edward Island) UPEI Panthers (MacFadyen)	0	0	1	0	2	0	X	X	3
(Nova Scotia) Dalhousie Tigers (Purcell)	2	2	0	3	0	1	X	X	8

=== Playoffs ===
Semifinals
1	(Nova Scotia) Dalhousie Tigers	9
4	(Nova Scotia) St. Francis Xavier X-Men	3
2	(Nova Scotia) Saint Mary's Huskies	8
3	(New Brunswick) UNB Reds	3

Gold medal game
1	(Nova Scotia) Dalhousie Tigers	6
2	(Nova Scotia) Saint Mary's Huskies	5

==== Semifinals ====
Sunday, February 11, 9:00 am

Sheet 1	1	2	3	4	5	6	7	8	Final
(Nova Scotia) Saint Mary's Huskies (Mosher)	1	0	3	0	4	0	X	X	8
(New Brunswick) UNB Reds (Stewart)	0	1	0	1	0	1	X	X	3

Sheet 2	1	2	3	4	5	6	7	8	Final
(Nova Scotia) Dalhousie Tigers (Purcell)	1	0	2	1	3	0	2	X	9
(Nova Scotia) St. Francis Xavier X-Men (Pugsley)	0	2	0	0	0	1	0	X	3

==== Gold medal game ====
Sunday, February 11, 1:00 pm

Sheet 3	1	2	3	4	5	6	7	8	Final
(Nova Scotia) Dalhousie Tigers (Purcell)	1	0	1	0	2	1	0	1	6
(Nova Scotia) Saint Mary's Huskies (Mosher)	0	1	0	2	0	0	2	0	5

== Women ==
=== Teams ===
The teams are listed as follows:

Team	Skip	Third	Second	Lead	Alternate	University
Dalhousie Tigers	Allyson MacNutt	Lindsey Burgess	Grace McCusker	Cate Fitzgerald	Marlise Carter	(Nova Scotia) Dalhousie University
Memorial Sea-Hawks	Sarah McNeil Lamswood	Kate Paterson	Izzy Paterson	Emily Neary		(Newfoundland and Labrador) Memorial University of Newfoundland
Mount Allison Mounties	Olivia Wynter	Cerys Fisher	– (Note: Mount Allison played with three players.)	Lauren Sallaj		(New Brunswick) Mount Allison University
Saint Mary's Huskies	Maria Fitzgerald	Abby Slauenwhite	Ella Wilson	Emma Butler		(Nova Scotia) Saint Mary's University
St. Francis Xavier X-Women	Abby Rafuse	Deidra Fraser	Hanna Manthorne	Ace MacDonald	Kate Steele	(Nova Scotia) St. Francis Xavier University
UNB Reds	Jenna Campbell	Carly Smith	Véronique Carroll	Rebecca Watson	Kirsten Donovan	University of New Brunswick
UPEI Panthers	Sophie Blades	Sydney Howatt	Rachel MacLean	Lexie Murray	Beth Stokes	University of Prince Edward Island

=== Round robin standings ===
Final Round Robin Standings

Key
Teams to Playoffs

Team	Skip	W	L	PF	PA	EW	EL	BE	SE
(Nova Scotia) Dalhousie Tigers	Allyson MacNutt	6	0	42	22	26	16	2	9
(New Brunswick) Mount Allison Mounties	Olivia Wynter	4	2	39	23	22	18	2	7
(New Brunswick) UNB Reds	Jenna Campbell	4	2	30	29	21	18	1	6
(Nova Scotia) Saint Mary's Huskies	Maria Fitzgerald	3	3	25	34	18	23	2	8
(Prince Edward Island) UPEI Panthers	Sophie Blades	3	3	29	26	22	21	1	6
(Newfoundland and Labrador) Memorial Sea-Hawks	Sarah McNeil Lamswood	1	5	26	34	21	23	2	7
(Nova Scotia) St. Francis Xavier X-Women	Abby Rafuse	0	6	17	40	13	24	3	2

=== Round robin results ===
All draw times are listed in Atlantic Time (UTC−03:00).

==== Draw 1 ====
Thursday, February 8, 9:00 am

Sheet 1	1	2	3	4	5	6	7	8	Final
(Nova Scotia) Saint Mary's Huskies (Fitzgerald)	0	1	0	0	0	2	0	X	3
(Nova Scotia) Dalhousie Tigers (MacNutt)	2	0	0	2	1	0	2	X	7

Sheet 2	1	2	3	4	5	6	7	8	Final
(Newfoundland and Labrador) Memorial Sea-Hawks (McNeil Lamswood)	1	1	1	0	0	0	0	X	3
(New Brunswick) UNB Reds (Campbell)	0	0	0	3	0	2	3	X	8

Sheet 4	1	2	3	4	5	6	7	8	Final
(New Brunswick) Mount Allison Mounties (Wynter)	0	1	0	0	0	1	0	X	2
(Prince Edward Island) UPEI Panthers (Blades)	1	0	2	1	1	0	1	X	6

==== Draw 2 ====
Thursday, February 8, 2:00 pm

Sheet 1	1	2	3	4	5	6	7	8	Final
(Nova Scotia) St. Francis Xavier X-Women (Rafuse)	0	1	0	0	2	0	1	0	4
(Prince Edward Island) UPEI Panthers (Blades)	1	0	2	0	0	2	0	0	5

Sheet 2	1	2	3	4	5	6	7	8	Final
(New Brunswick) Mount Allison Mounties (Wynter)	3	0	1	2	1	2	X	X	9
(Nova Scotia) Saint Mary's Huskies (Fitzgerald)	0	1	0	0	0	0	X	X	1

Sheet 3	1	2	3	4	5	6	7	8	Final
(New Brunswick) UNB Reds (Campbell)	0	0	0	1	0	0	X	X	1
(Nova Scotia) Dalhousie Tigers (MacNutt)	2	1	2	0	2	1	X	X	8

==== Draw 3 ====
Thursday, February 8, 7:00 pm

Sheet 3	1	2	3	4	5	6	7	8	Final
(Nova Scotia) St. Francis Xavier X-Women (Rafuse)	0	2	0	0	0	0	1	X	3
(Newfoundland and Labrador) Memorial Sea-Hawks (McNeil Lamswood)	1	0	0	1	0	3	0	X	5

==== Draw 4 ====
Friday, February 9, 9:00 am

Sheet 1	1	2	3	4	5	6	7	8	Final
(New Brunswick) Mount Allison Mounties (Wynter)	0	2	0	1	2	2	X	X	7
(Nova Scotia) St. Francis Xavier X-Women (Rafuse)	0	0	1	0	0	0	X	X	1

Sheet 3	1	2	3	4	5	6	7	8	Final
(Prince Edward Island) UPEI Panthers (Blades)	2	1	0	0	0	0	2	X	5
(Nova Scotia) Saint Mary's Huskies (Fitzgerald)	0	0	2	1	1	2	0	X	6

Sheet 4	1	2	3	4	5	6	7	8	9	Final
(Nova Scotia) Dalhousie Tigers (MacNutt)	0	2	1	1	0	0	2	0	1	7
(Newfoundland and Labrador) Memorial Sea-Hawks (McNeil Lamswood)	1	0	0	0	2	2	0	1	0	6

==== Draw 5 ====
Friday, February 9, 2:00 pm

Sheet 2	1	2	3	4	5	6	7	8	Final
(Nova Scotia) St. Francis Xavier X-Women (Rafuse)	0	0	1	1	0	0	0	X	2
(Nova Scotia) Dalhousie Tigers (MacNutt)	1	0	0	0	1	2	4	X	8

Sheet 3	1	2	3	4	5	6	7	8	9	Final
(Newfoundland and Labrador) Memorial Sea-Hawks (McNeil Lamswood)	1	0	1	0	1	0	2	0	0	5
(New Brunswick) Mount Allison Mounties (Wynter)	0	1	0	1	0	1	0	2	1	6

Sheet 4	1	2	3	4	5	6	7	8	Final
(Nova Scotia) Saint Mary's Huskies (Fitzgerald)	0	0	0	0	1	0	2	0	3
(New Brunswick) UNB Reds (Campbell)	1	0	1	1	0	1	0	1	5

==== Draw 6 ====
Friday, February 9, 7:00 pm

Sheet 2	1	2	3	4	5	6	7	8	Final
(Prince Edward Island) UPEI Panthers (Blades)	0	1	0	0	2	0	1	0	4
(New Brunswick) UNB Reds (Campbell)	1	0	0	1	0	1	0	2	5

==== Draw 7 ====
Saturday, February 10, 9:00 am

Sheet 4	1	2	3	4	5	6	7	8	Final
(New Brunswick) UNB Reds (Campbell)	1	0	1	0	1	3	2	X	8
(Nova Scotia) St. Francis Xavier X-Women (Rafuse)	0	1	0	1	0	0	0	X	2

==== Draw 8 ====
Saturday, February 10, 2:00 pm

Sheet 1	1	2	3	4	5	6	7	8	Final
(Nova Scotia) Dalhousie Tigers (MacNutt)	0	0	2	0	2	1	0	2	7
(New Brunswick) Mount Allison Mounties (Wynter)	0	2	0	3	0	0	1	0	6

Sheet 2	1	2	3	4	5	6	7	8	Final
(Prince Edward Island) UPEI Panthers (Blades)	0	0	2	1	0	0	1	1	5
(Newfoundland and Labrador) Memorial Sea-Hawks (McNeil Lamswood)	1	1	0	0	1	1	0	0	4

Sheet 3	1	2	3	4	5	6	7	8	Final
(Nova Scotia) Saint Mary's Huskies (Fitzgerald)	2	0	0	1	0	1	2	1	7
(Nova Scotia) St. Francis Xavier X-Women (Rafuse)	0	1	2	0	2	0	0	0	5

==== Draw 9 ====
Saturday, February 10, 7:00 pm

Sheet 1	1	2	3	4	5	6	7	8	Final
(Newfoundland and Labrador) Memorial Sea-Hawks (McNeil Lamswood)	1	1	0	0	0	1	0	0	3
(Nova Scotia) Saint Mary's Huskies (Fitzgerald)	0	0	0	1	1	0	1	2	5

Sheet 2	1	2	3	4	5	6	7	8	Final
(New Brunswick) UNB Reds (Campbell)	1	0	0	1	0	1	X	X	3
(New Brunswick) Mount Allison Mounties (Wynter)	0	1	2	0	6	0	X	X	9

Sheet 3	1	2	3	4	5	6	7	8	9	Final
(Nova Scotia) Dalhousie Tigers (MacNutt)	1	0	1	0	2	0	0	0	1	5
(Prince Edward Island) UPEI Panthers (Blades)	0	1	0	1	0	1	0	1	0	4

=== Playoffs ===
Semifinals
1	(Nova Scotia) Dalhousie Tigers	7
4	(Nova Scotia) Saint Mary's Huskies	1
2	(New Brunswick) Mount Allison Mounties	4
3	(New Brunswick) UNB Reds	6

Gold medal game
1	(Nova Scotia) Dalhousie Tigers	4
3	(New Brunswick) UNB Reds	5
Bronze medal game
4	(Nova Scotia) Saint Mary's Huskies	7
2	(New Brunswick) Mount Allison Mounties	8

==== Semifinals ====
Sunday, February 11, 9:00 am

Sheet 3	1	2	3	4	5	6	7	8	Final
(New Brunswick) Mount Allison Mounties (Wynter)	0	2	0	0	1	1	0	0	4
(New Brunswick) UNB Reds (Campbell)	1	0	1	1	0	0	2	1	6

Sheet 4	1	2	3	4	5	6	7	8	Final
(Nova Scotia) Dalhousie Tigers (MacNutt)	1	1	0	3	1	1	X	X	7
(Nova Scotia) Saint Mary's Huskies (Fitzgerald)	0	0	1	0	0	0	X	X	1

==== Bronze medal game ====
Sunday, February 11, 1:00 pm

Sheet 1	1	2	3	4	5	6	7	8	9	10	Final
(Nova Scotia) Saint Mary's Huskies (Fitzgerald)	3	0	1	0	1	2	0	0	0	0	7
(New Brunswick) Mount Allison Mounties (Wynter)	0	3	0	1	0	0	2	1	0	1	8

==== Gold medal game ====
Sunday, February 11, 1:00 pm

Sheet 2	1	2	3	4	5	6	7	8	9	Final
(Nova Scotia) Dalhousie Tigers (MacNutt)	2	0	0	1	0	0	0	1	0	4
(New Brunswick) UNB Reds (Campbell)	0	1	0	0	1	1	1	0	1	5
