= Catherine Clifford =

Canadian curler

- Curler
- Born: February 11, 2000 (age 26); Chauvin, Alberta

Team
- Curling club: Saville Community SC, Edmonton, AB
- Skip: Serena Gray-Withers
- Third: Catherine Clifford
- Second: Laura Walker
- Lead: Zoe Cinnamon

Curling career
- Member Association: Alberta
- Top CTRS ranking: 5th (2025–26)
Medal record
Curling
Representing Canada
World University Games
Bronze medal – third place	2025 Turin	Team

Catherine Clifford (born February 11, 2000) is a Canadian curler from Chauvin, Alberta. She currently plays third on Team Serena Gray-Withers. She was named as the flagbearer for Team Canada at the 2025 Winter World University Games.

== Career ==
=== Youth ===
Clifford made her first provincial junior final in 2017 as third for Abby Marks, losing 10–5 to Kayla Skrlik. The following season, Clifford skipped her own team to a 4–3 record before falling to Selena Sturmay in a tiebreaker.

After graduating high school, Clifford was recruited to the University of Alberta Pandas curling team where she played third on the junior team led by Marks. In their first season together, the team, with Paige Papley and Jamie Scott on the front end, won the Alberta junior championship. This qualified them for the 2020 Canadian Junior Curling Championships where they finished where they finished 6–4 through the round robin and championship pools, tying them for third. The team then won two tiebreakers and the semifinal before coming up short to Manitoba's Mackenzie Zacharias in the final, settling for silver. Later that season, Clifford joined the Pandas varsity team as their alternate at the 2020 U Sports/Curling Canada University Curling Championships. After going 6–1 in the round robin, the team won both their semifinal and gold medal matches to secure the title.

Because of a change in dates for the Canadian Junior championships during the 2020–21 season, Curling Canada selected the athletes that would represent Canada at the 2021 World Junior Curling Championships. Clifford was chosen for this team, alongside teammates Marks, Scott and Brianna Cullen. However, the world championship was cancelled due to the COVID-19 pandemic.

=== Women's ===
Aged out of juniors, Clifford continued competing with Marks and Papley as they picked up Selena Sturmay as their new skip. This team saw moderate success together, reaching the final of the Avonair Alberta Curling Series event and the semifinals of the Red Deer Curling Classic and Thistle ACS event. They also qualified for the 2022 Alberta Scotties Tournament of Hearts as the excel points leader where they finished in seventh with a 2–5 record. They ended their season with a victory at the Alberta Curling Tour Championship.

For the 2022–23 season, Clifford joined the Serena Gray-Withers rink at third with Brianna Cullen and Zoe Cinnamon rounding out the team. This new lineup found immediate success, winning the inaugural U25 NextGen Classic and earning a berth into Curling Canada's NextGen Program. On the women's tour, the team found considerable success as a new team, winning the second event of the Alberta Curling Series and reaching the quarterfinals of the 2022 Saville Shoot-Out and the DeKalb Superspiel. They also competed in the 2022 Tour Challenge Tier 2 Grand Slam of Curling event where they finished 1–3. In the new year, the team represented the Alberta Pandas at the 2023 U Sports/Curling Canada University Curling Championships. Building on their success from the women's tour, the team reached the playoffs with a 4–3 record before defeating the Memorial Sea-Hawks and the Dalhousie Tigers in the semifinal and gold medal games to secure the title. Also during the 2022–23 season, Clifford won the 2022 World University Games Qualifier as third for Marks and the team went on to represent Canada at the 2023 Winter World University Games where they finished with a 4–5 record, missing the playoffs.

To begin the 2023–24 season, Team Gray-Withers defended their title at the U25 NextGen Classic. They also had a strong showing in their first tour event, the 2023 Saville Shootout, defeating the likes of Kerri Einarson and Gim Eun-ji en route to a semifinal finish. Because they won the U Sport title the season before, the team earned a berth into the 2023 PointsBet Invitational. There, they lost in the first round to Isabelle Ladouceur. Back on tour, the team reached the semifinals at the Saville Grand Prix and Ladies Alberta Open, however, failed to reach the playoffs at five other tour events, including the 2023 Tour Challenge Tier 2. Despite this, they earned enough points to qualify for the 2024 Alberta Scotties Tournament of Hearts. Entering as the second seeds, Team Gray-Withers had a strong performance, finishing the round robin with a 5–2 record and qualifying for the playoffs. They then faced Kayla Skrlik in the semifinal where they lost 9–8 in an extra end. To end the season, the team played in the 2024 U Sports/Curling Canada University Curling Championships after securing the Canada West title. There, the team ran the table with a perfect 9–0 record to secure their second consecutive title and qualify as Team Canada for the 2025 Winter World University Games the following season. Brianna Cullen left the team following the season and was replaced at second by Lindsey Burgess.

After climbing the ranks the last two seasons, Team Gray-Withers fell from ninth to twenty-fifth in the Canadian rankings during the 2024–25 season. This began with a third place finish at the U25 NextGen Classic after falling to Taylor Reese-Hansen in the semifinal. Following this, the team missed the playoffs at seven straight tour events, including the 2024 Tour Challenge Tier 2, and lost in the first round of the 2024 PointsBet Invitational. They turned things around in December by winning the second Alberta Curling Series event. The team then competed in the World University Games where they finished 7–2 through the round robin to advance to the playoffs. They then lost 6–5 to Japan's Yuina Miura in the semifinal but bounced back to beat Norway's Torild Bjørnstad in the bronze medal game. After failing to qualify for the 2025 U Sports/Curling Canada University Curling Championships due to a fourth place finish at the Canada West championship, the team ended the season by winning the Best of the West U30 event.

The 2025–26 season was a breakthrough season for the Gray-Withers rink as they climbed to number five on the CTRS standings. In August, the team won their third NextGen Classic title, defeating Mélodie Forsythe in the final. They then reached the semifinals of the 2025 Saville Shootout once again, losing out to Gim Eun-ji. The team then won back-to-back events at the Saville U25 Challenge and McKee Homes Fall Curling Classic before claiming the inaugural U25 Tour Challenge Grand Slam title. In November, the team lost in the final of the DeKalb Superspiel to Miyu Ueno and reached the semifinals of the Crestwood Anniversary Showdown. They also made it to the quarterfinals of the 2025 Canadian Open Tier 2 where they were defeated by Taylor Reese-Hansen. With all their playoff appearances throughout the fall, the team entered the 2026 Alberta Women's Curling Championship as the number one seeds and qualified for the playoffs through the A side, defeating second seed Selena Sturmay. They then beat Sturmay again in the 1 vs. 2 game to qualify for the final where they'd meet Sturmay for a third time. After giving up a steal of two in the third end, the team trailed throughout the rest of the game, ultimately losing 9–5 and finishing second. Team Gray-Withers ended their season at the Karuizawa International where they finished fourth. In March, the team announced they would be parting ways with Burgess and adding Laura Walker as their new second for the 2026–27 season.

== Personal life ==
Clifford attended the University of Alberta where she studied kinesiology before completing her Masters in public health.

== Teams ==
Season	Skip	Third	Second	Lead
2016–17	Kelsie Leeder	Kelsey Dixon	Catherine Clifford	Sara Paulgaard
2017–18	Abby Marks	Catherine Clifford	Jamie Scott	Olivia Jones
2018–19	Catherine Clifford	Jamie Scott	Kim Bonneau	Sarah Clifford
2019–20	Abby Marks	Catherine Clifford	Paige Papley	Jamie Scott
2020–21	Abby Marks	Catherine Clifford	Paige Papley	Jamie Scott
2021–22	Selena Sturmay	Abby Marks	Catherine Clifford	Paige Papley
2022–23	Serena Gray-Withers	Catherine Clifford	Brianna Cullen	Zoe Cinnamon
2023–24	Serena Gray-Withers	Catherine Clifford	Brianna Cullen	Zoe Cinnamon
2024–25	Serena Gray-Withers	Catherine Clifford	Lindsey Burgess	Zoe Cinnamon
2025–26	Serena Gray-Withers	Catherine Clifford	Lindsey Burgess	Zoe Cinnamon
2026–27	Serena Gray-Withers	Catherine Clifford	Laura Walker	Zoe Cinnamon
