= 2024 U Sports/Curling Canada University Curling Championships =

2024 U Sports/Curling Canada Championships
- Host city: Fredericton, New Brunswick
- Arena: Aitken University Centre & Capital Winter Club
- Dates: March 12–16
- Men's winner: (Saskatchewan) Regina Cougars
- Curling club: Callie Curling Club, Regina
- Skip: Josh Bryden
- Third: Adam Bukurak
- Second: Carter Williamson
- Lead: Ryan Grabarczyk
- Alternate: Ayden Wittmire
- Coach: Jamie Schneider
- Finalist: (Nova Scotia) Dalhousie Tigers (Purcell)
- Women's winner: Alberta Pandas
- Curling club: Saville Community Sports Centre, Edmonton
- Skip: Serena Gray-Withers
- Third: Catherine Clifford
- Second: Brianna Cullen
- Lead: Zoe Cinnamon
- Coach: Amanda St. Laurent
- Finalist: (Ontario) Waterloo Warriors (Evans)

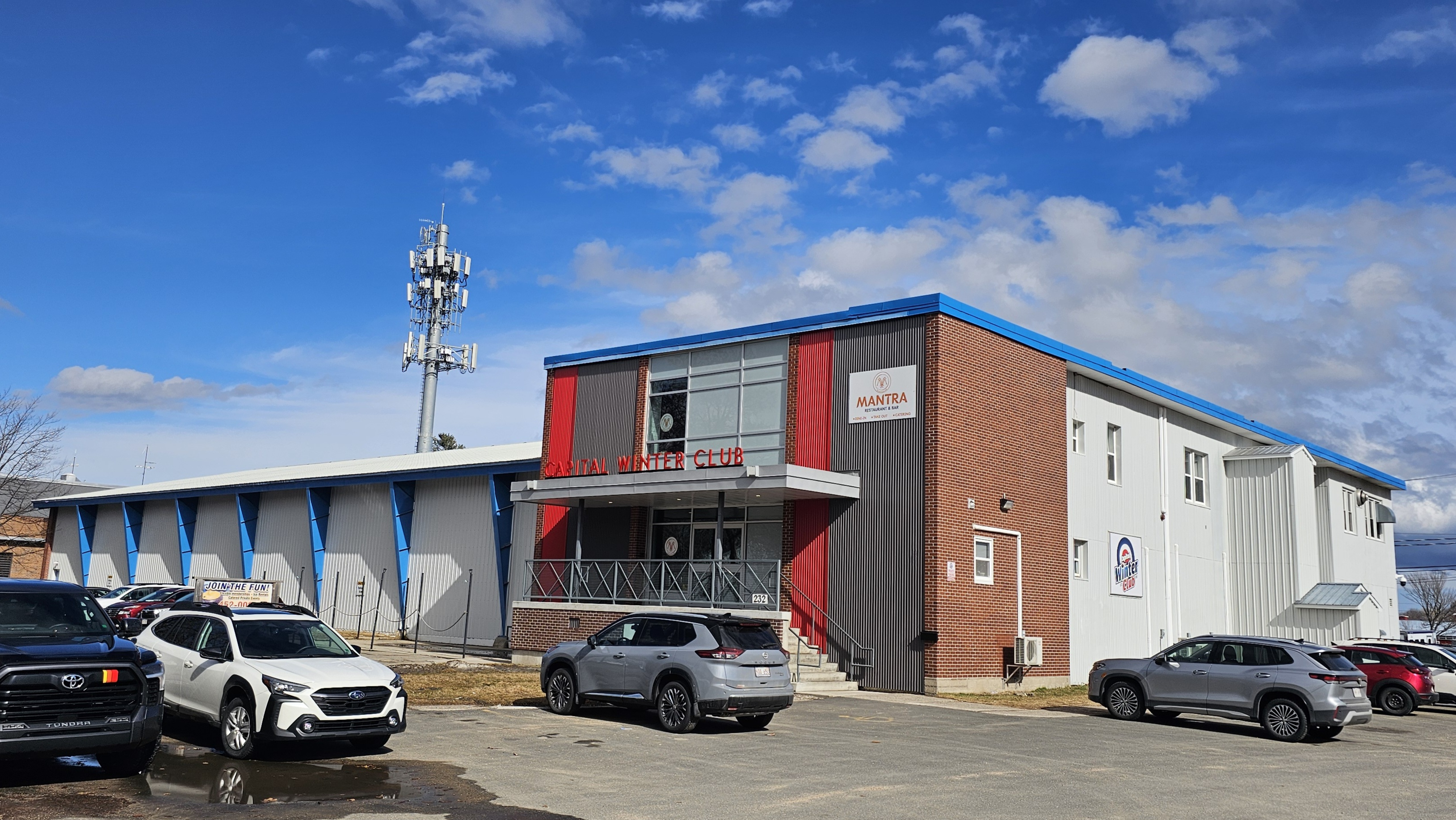
The Capital Winter Club in 2026

The 2024 U Sports/Curling Canada University Championships was held from March 12 to 16 at the Aitken University Centre and the Capital Winter Club in Fredericton, New Brunswick. The host university of the event was the University of New Brunswick. The event was held in conjunction with the 2024 CCAA/Curling Canada College Curling Championships, the Canadian college curling championship.

== Men ==
=== Qualification ===
The following universities qualified to participate in the 2024 U Sports/Curling Canada University Curling Championships:

Region	Vacancies	Qualified
Host	1	(New Brunswick) UNB Reds
Canada West Universities Athletic Association	2	Alberta Golden Bears (Saskatchewan) Regina Cougars
Ontario University Athletics	3	(Ontario) Wilfrid Laurier Golden Hawks (Ontario) Brock Badgers (Ontario) Guelph Gryphons
Atlantic University Sport	2	(Nova Scotia) Dalhousie Tigers (Nova Scotia) Saint Mary's Huskies
TOTAL	8	

=== Teams ===
The teams are listed as follows:

Team	Skip	Third	Second	Lead	Alternate	University
Alberta Golden Bears	Johnson Tao	Jaedon Neuert	Benjamin Morin	Andrew Nowell		University of Alberta
Brock Badgers	Owen Henry	Victor Pietrangelo	Sean Kirkland	Patrick Sipura	Daniel Krowchuk	(Ontario) Brock University
Dalhousie Tigers	Owen Purcell	Owen McPherson	David McCurdy	Caelan McPherson	Ethan Young	(Nova Scotia) Dalhousie University
Guelph Gryphons	Jayden King	Dylan Niepage	Gavin Lydiate	Daniel Del Conte	Carter Bryant	(Ontario) University of Guelph
Regina Cougars	Josh Bryden	Adam Bukurak	Carter Williamson	Ryan Grabarczyk	Ayden Wittmire	(Saskatchewan) University of Regina
Saint Mary's Huskies	Nick Mosher	Benjamin Currie	Chris Churchill	Craig Weagle		(Nova Scotia) Saint Mary's University
UNB Reds	Jamie Stewart	Sean Beland	James Carr	Loris Elliott	Luke Wilson	University of New Brunswick
Wilfrid Laurier Golden Hawks	Sam Mooibroek	Kibo Mulima	Wyatt Small	Ben Pearce	Codie Harris	(Ontario) Wilfrid Laurier University

=== Round robin standings ===
Final Round Robin Standings

Key
Teams to Playoffs

Team	Skip	W	L	PF	PA	EW	EL	BE	SE
Alberta Golden Bears	Johnson Tao	6	1	53	29	35	21	1	15
(Ontario) Wilfrid Laurier Golden Hawks	Sam Mooibroek	5	2	53	33	33	24	4	10
(Nova Scotia) Dalhousie Tigers	Owen Purcell	5	2	49	44	27	24	9	6
(Saskatchewan) Regina Cougars	Josh Bryden	4	3	42	39	26	27	5	10
(New Brunswick) UNB Reds	Jamie Stewart	3	4	44	50	23	31	4	7
(Ontario) Guelph Gryphons	Jayden King	3	4	39	43	24	25	7	9
(Nova Scotia) Saint Mary's Huskies	Nick Mosher	1	6	41	56	27	34	1	11
(Ontario) Brock Badgers	Owen Henry	1	6	33	60	23	32	8	4

Round Robin Summary Table
Pos.	Team	(Alberta) UAB	(Ontario) BRO	(Nova Scotia) DAL	(Ontario) GUE	(Saskatchewan) REG	(Nova Scotia) SMU	(New Brunswick) UNB	(Ontario) WLU	Record
1	Alberta Golden Bears	—	7–4	8–9	6–4	6–3	8–4	12–1	6–4	6–1
8	(Ontario) Brock Badgers	4–7	—	5–11	7–6	6–8	5–10	2–9	4–9	1–6
3	(Nova Scotia) Dalhousie Tigers	9–8	11–5	—	2–9	8–4	10–3	7–6	2–9	5–2
6	(Ontario) Guelph Gryphons	4–6	6–7	9–2	—	5–8	7–5	2–10	6–5	3–4
4	(Saskatchewan) Regina Cougars	3–6	8–6	4–8	8–5	—	6–5	9–2	4–7	4–3
7	(Nova Scotia) Saint Mary's Huskies	4–8	10–5	3–10	5–7	5–6	—	9–10	5–10	1–6
5	(New Brunswick) UNB Reds	1–12	9–2	6–7	10–2	2–9	10–9	—	6–9	3–4
2	(Ontario) Wilfrid Laurier Golden Hawks	4–6	9–4	9–2	5–6	7–4	10–5	9–6	—	5–2

=== Round robin results ===
All draws are listed in Atlantic Time (UTC−04:00).

==== Draw 2 ====
Tuesday, March 12, 9:00 pm

Sheet B	1	2	3	4	5	6	7	8	9	10	Final
(Saskatchewan) Regina Cougars (Bryden)	0	0	2	0	0	1	0	0	1	0	4
(Ontario) Wilfrid Laurier Golden Hawks (Mooibroek) 🔨	1	1	0	0	1	0	1	2	0	1	7

Sheet D	1	2	3	4	5	6	7	8	9	10	Final
(Ontario) Guelph Gryphons (King)	1	1	0	0	1	0	2	1	0	1	7
(Nova Scotia) Saint Mary's Huskies (Mosher) 🔨	0	0	0	1	0	1	0	0	3	0	5

Sheet G	1	2	3	4	5	6	7	8	9	10	Final
(Ontario) Brock Badgers (Henry)	0	0	1	0	0	0	1	0	X	X	2
(New Brunswick) UNB Reds (Stewart) 🔨	2	0	0	0	2	1	0	4	X	X	9

Sheet H	1	2	3	4	5	6	7	8	9	10	11	Final
(Nova Scotia) Dalhousie Tigers (Purcell) 🔨	0	1	0	2	2	0	0	1	0	2	1	9
Alberta Golden Bears (Tao)	0	0	1	0	0	2	3	0	2	0	0	8

==== Draw 4 ====
Wednesday, March 13, 12:30 pm

Sheet B	1	2	3	4	5	6	7	8	9	10	Final
(Nova Scotia) Saint Mary's Huskies (Mosher)	1	0	1	0	0	1	0	0	X	X	3
(Nova Scotia) Dalhousie Tigers (Purcell) 🔨	0	3	0	2	2	0	2	1	X	X	10

Sheet C	1	2	3	4	5	6	7	8	9	10	Final
(New Brunswick) UNB Reds (Stewart)	0	0	0	0	2	0	0	0	X	X	2
(Saskatchewan) Regina Cougars (Bryden) 🔨	2	1	1	0	0	2	2	1	X	X	9

Sheet E	1	2	3	4	5	6	7	8	9	10	Final
(Ontario) Wilfrid Laurier Golden Hawks (Mooibroek)	0	3	1	0	2	3	0	0	X	X	9
(Ontario) Brock Badgers (Henry) 🔨	1	0	0	2	0	0	1	0	X	X	4

Sheet G	1	2	3	4	5	6	7	8	9	10	Final
Alberta Golden Bears (Tao)	0	0	0	2	0	0	2	1	0	1	6
(Ontario) Guelph Gryphons (King) 🔨	0	0	2	0	0	2	0	0	0	0	4

==== Draw 6 ====
Wednesday, March 13, 8:30 pm

Sheet A	1	2	3	4	5	6	7	8	9	10	Final
Alberta Golden Bears (Tao) 🔨	3	2	1	1	3	1	0	1	X	X	12
(New Brunswick) UNB Reds (Stewart)	0	0	0	0	0	0	1	0	X	X	1

Sheet C	1	2	3	4	5	6	7	8	9	10	Final
(Nova Scotia) Dalhousie Tigers (Purcell)	0	2	0	0	4	2	1	0	2	X	11
(Ontario) Brock Badgers (Henry) 🔨	3	0	1	0	0	0	0	1	0	X	5

Sheet F	1	2	3	4	5	6	7	8	9	10	Final
(Nova Scotia) Saint Mary's Huskies (Mosher)	0	0	0	1	0	2	0	2	0	X	5
(Ontario) Wilfrid Laurier Golden Hawks (Mooibroek) 🔨	1	2	1	0	2	0	2	0	2	X	10

Sheet H	1	2	3	4	5	6	7	8	9	10	Final
(Ontario) Guelph Gryphons (King)	0	0	2	1	0	1	0	0	1	X	5
(Saskatchewan) Regina Cougars (Bryden) 🔨	0	3	0	0	0	0	3	2	0	X	8

==== Draw 8 ====
Thursday, March 14, 12:30 pm

Sheet A	1	2	3	4	5	6	7	8	9	10	Final
(Saskatchewan) Regina Cougars (Bryden)	0	0	0	1	0	2	0	1	0	X	4
(Nova Scotia) Dalhousie Tigers (Purcell) 🔨	0	0	3	0	1	0	2	0	2	X	8

Sheet D	1	2	3	4	5	6	7	8	9	10	Final
(Ontario) Wilfrid Laurier Golden Hawks (Mooibroek)	0	0	0	0	1	1	0	0	2	0	4
Alberta Golden Bears (Tao) 🔨	1	1	0	1	0	0	1	1	0	1	6

Sheet E	1	2	3	4	5	6	7	8	9	10	Final
(New Brunswick) UNB Reds (Stewart) 🔨	2	0	0	0	3	2	0	0	0	3	10
(Nova Scotia) Saint Mary's Huskies (Mosher)	0	1	3	0	0	0	2	1	2	0	9

Sheet F	1	2	3	4	5	6	7	8	9	10	11	Final
(Ontario) Brock Badgers (Henry)	1	2	0	0	2	1	0	0	0	0	1	7
(Ontario) Guelph Gryphons (King) 🔨	0	0	1	0	0	0	2	1	1	1	0	6

==== Draw 10 ====
Thursday, March 14, 8:30 pm

Sheet C	1	2	3	4	5	6	7	8	9	10	Final
(Nova Scotia) Saint Mary's Huskies (Mosher)	0	0	0	1	0	2	0	1	0	X	4
Alberta Golden Bears (Tao) 🔨	0	1	1	0	3	0	2	0	1	X	8

Sheet D	1	2	3	4	5	6	7	8	9	10	Final
(Ontario) Brock Badgers (Henry) 🔨	0	0	0	0	2	2	0	0	2	0	6
(Saskatchewan) Regina Cougars (Bryden)	0	0	0	2	0	0	2	3	0	1	8

Sheet E	1	2	3	4	5	6	7	8	9	10	Final
(Nova Scotia) Dalhousie Tigers (Purcell)	0	0	0	0	2	0	X	X	X	X	2
(Ontario) Guelph Gryphons (King) 🔨	4	0	5	0	0	0	X	X	X	X	9

Sheet H	1	2	3	4	5	6	7	8	9	10	Final
(Ontario) Wilfrid Laurier Golden Hawks (Mooibroek) 🔨	2	0	1	1	0	0	3	1	0	1	9
(New Brunswick) UNB Reds (Stewart)	0	1	0	0	3	0	0	0	2	0	6

==== Draw 11 ====
Friday, March 15, 8:30 am

Sheet A	1	2	3	4	5	6	7	8	9	10	Final
(Nova Scotia) Saint Mary's Huskies (Mosher)	1	1	0	0	5	1	0	1	1	X	10
(Ontario) Brock Badgers (Henry) 🔨	0	0	1	2	0	0	2	0	0	X	5

Sheet B	1	2	3	4	5	6	7	8	9	10	Final
(Ontario) Guelph Gryphons (King)	0	0	2	0	0	0	0	X	X	X	2
(New Brunswick) UNB Reds (Stewart) 🔨	0	3	0	2	2	1	2	X	X	X	10

Sheet F	1	2	3	4	5	6	7	8	9	10	Final
Alberta Golden Bears (Tao)	0	0	1	1	0	2	0	1	1	X	6
(Saskatchewan) Regina Cougars (Bryden) 🔨	0	1	0	0	2	0	0	0	0	X	3

Sheet G	1	2	3	4	5	6	7	8	9	10	Final
(Nova Scotia) Dalhousie Tigers (Purcell)	0	1	0	0	1	0	0	X	X	X	2
(Ontario) Wilfrid Laurier Golden Hawks (Mooibroek) 🔨	2	0	1	0	0	2	4	X	X	X	9

==== Draw 13 ====
Friday, March 15, 4:30 pm

Sheet A	1	2	3	4	5	6	7	8	9	10	Final
(Ontario) Guelph Gryphons (King)	0	0	0	2	0	2	0	1	0	1	6
(Ontario) Wilfrid Laurier Golden Hawks (Mooibroek) 🔨	2	0	0	0	1	0	1	0	1	0	5

Sheet B	1	2	3	4	5	6	7	8	9	10	11	Final
Alberta Golden Bears (Tao) 🔨	1	0	0	0	2	0	0	0	1	0	3	7
(Ontario) Brock Badgers (Henry)	0	0	0	1	0	0	1	1	0	1	0	4

Sheet F	1	2	3	4	5	6	7	8	9	10	11	Final
(New Brunswick) UNB Reds (Stewart)	0	0	0	2	0	1	1	1	0	1	0	6
(Nova Scotia) Dalhousie Tigers (Purcell) 🔨	0	0	2	0	2	0	0	0	2	0	1	7

Sheet G	1	2	3	4	5	6	7	8	9	10	Final
(Saskatchewan) Regina Cougars (Bryden) 🔨	0	1	1	0	0	0	0	1	2	1	6
(Nova Scotia) Saint Mary's Huskies (Mosher)	0	0	0	1	1	2	1	0	0	0	5

=== Playoffs ===
Semifinal
1	Alberta Golden Bears	5
4	(Saskatchewan) Regina Cougars	7
2	(Ontario) Wilfrid Laurier Golden Hawks	3
3	(Nova Scotia) Dalhousie Tigers	8

Final
4	(Saskatchewan) Regina Cougars	8
3	(Nova Scotia) Dalhousie Tigers	5
Bronze medal game
1	Alberta Golden Bears	9
2	(Ontario) Wilfrid Laurier Golden Hawks	7

==== Semifinals ====
Saturday, March 16, 9:30 am

Sheet D	1	2	3	4	5	6	7	8	9	10	Final
Alberta Golden Bears (Tao) 🔨	0	2	0	1	0	0	2	0	0	0	5
(Saskatchewan) Regina Cougars (Bryden)	1	0	1	0	0	2	0	1	1	1	7

Sheet E	1	2	3	4	5	6	7	8	9	10	Final
(Ontario) Wilfrid Laurier Golden Hawks (Mooibroek) 🔨	0	0	0	1	0	2	0	0	X	X	3
(Nova Scotia) Dalhousie Tigers (Purcell)	2	1	1	0	0	0	1	3	X	X	8

==== Bronze medal game ====
Saturday, March 16, 2:30 pm

Sheet H	1	2	3	4	5	6	7	8	9	10	Final
Alberta Golden Bears (Tao) 🔨	5	0	1	0	0	1	0	0	0	2	9
(Ontario) Wilfrid Laurier Golden Hawks (Mooibroek)	0	2	0	1	1	0	3	0	0	0	7

==== Final ====
Saturday, March 16, 2:30 pm

Sheet C	1	2	3	4	5	6	7	8	9	10	Final
(Saskatchewan) Regina Cougars (Bryden)	0	0	0	1	0	2	0	5	0	X	8
(Nova Scotia) Dalhousie Tigers (Purcell) 🔨	0	1	0	0	1	0	1	0	2	X	5

=== Final standings ===
Place	Team
1st place, gold medalist(s)	(Saskatchewan) Regina Cougars
2nd place, silver medalist(s)	(Nova Scotia) Dalhousie Tigers
3rd place, bronze medalist(s)	Alberta Golden Bears
4	(Ontario) Wilfrid Laurier Golden Hawks
5	(New Brunswick) UNB Reds
6	(Ontario) Guelph Gryphons
7	(Nova Scotia) Saint Mary's Huskies
8	(Ontario) Brock Badgers

== Women ==
=== Qualification ===
The following universities qualified to participate in the 2024 U Sports/Curling Canada University Curling Championships:

Region	Vacancies	Qualified
Host	1	(New Brunswick) UNB Reds
Canada West Universities Athletic Association	2	Alberta Pandas (British Columbia) Victoria Vikes
Ontario University Athletics	3	(Ontario) Laurentian Voyageurs (Ontario) McMaster Marauders (Ontario) Waterloo Warriors
Atlantic University Sport	2	(Nova Scotia) Dalhousie Tigers (New Brunswick) Mount Allison Mounties
TOTAL	8	

=== Teams ===
The teams are listed as follows:

Team	Skip	Third	Second	Lead	Alternate	University
Alberta Pandas	Serena Gray-Withers	Catherine Clifford	Brianna Cullen	Zoe Cinnamon		University of Alberta
Dalhousie Tigers	Allyson MacNutt	Lindsey Burgess	Grace McCusker	Cate Fitzgerald	Marlise Carter	(Nova Scotia) Dalhousie University
Laurentian Voyageurs	Bella Croisier	Piper Croisier	Mya Smith	Britney Malette	Valerie Ouimet	(Ontario) Laurentian University
McMaster Marauders	Maddy Warriner	Evelyn Robert	Clara Dissanayake	Anastasia Cornea	Sydney Taylor	(Ontario) McMaster University
Mount Allison Mounties	Olivia Wynter	Cerys Fisher	Lauren Guyader	Lauren Sallaj		(New Brunswick) Mount Allison University
UNB Reds	Jenna Campbell	Carly Smith	Véronique Carroll	Rebecca Watson	Kirsten Donovan	University of New Brunswick
Victoria Vikes	Mahra Harris	Meredith Cole	Gabby Brissette	Elizabeth Bowles		(British Columbia) University of Victoria
Waterloo Warriors	Celia Evans	Shannon Warriner	Julia Evans	Violet French		(Ontario) University of Waterloo

=== Round robin standings ===
Final Round Robin Standings

Key
Teams to Playoffs

Team	Skip	W	L	PF	PA	EW	EL	BE	SE
Alberta Pandas	Serena Gray-Withers	7	0	65	35	33	28	1	9
(New Brunswick) UNB Reds	Jenna Campbell	4	3	49	47	30	31	2	6
(Ontario) Waterloo Warriors	Celia Evans	4	3	49	48	28	32	2	7
(Nova Scotia) Dalhousie Tigers	Allyson MacNutt	4	3	55	43	35	26	2	14
(Ontario) McMaster Marauders	Maddy Warriner	3	4	52	50	31	31	4	9
(Ontario) Laurentian Voyageurs	Bella Croisier	3	4	44	54	28	30	0	6
(British Columbia) Victoria Vikes	Mahra Harris	2	5	40	51	30	30	4	8
(New Brunswick) Mount Allison Mounties	Olivia Wynter	1	6	40	66	25	32	4	8

Round Robin Summary Table
Pos.	Team	(Alberta) UAB	(Nova Scotia) DAL	(Ontario) LTN	(Ontario) MAC	(New Brunswick) MTA	(New Brunswick) UNB	(British Columbia) VIC	(Ontario) WAT	Record
1	Alberta Pandas	—	7–6	10–5	10–8	12–2	9–6	8–4	9–4	7–0
4	(Nova Scotia) Dalhousie Tigers	6–7	—	8–6	8–5	10–1	6–11	9–4	8–9	4–3
6	(Ontario) Laurentian Voyageurs	5–10	6–8	—	3–10	6–4	6–8	11–10	7–4	3–4
4	(Ontario) McMaster Marauders	8–10	5–8	10–3	—	7–4	8–6	5–7	9–12	3–4
8	(New Brunswick) Mount Allison Mounties	2–12	1–10	4–6	4–7	—	6–7	10–9	6–10	1–6
2	(New Brunswick) UNB Reds	6–9	11–6	8–6	6–8	7–6	—	5–10	6–2	4–3
7	(British Columbia) Victoria Vikes	4–8	4–9	10–11	7–5	9–10	10–5	—	3–8	2–5
3	(Ontario) Waterloo Warriors	4–9	9–8	4–7	12–9	10–6	2–6	8–3	—	4–3

=== Round robin results ===
All draws are listed in Atlantic Time (UTC−04:00).

==== Draw 1 ====
Tuesday, March 12, 4:30 pm

Sheet B	1	2	3	4	5	6	7	8	9	10	Final
(Ontario) Waterloo Warriors (Evans)	0	1	0	3	0	3	1	2	0	2	12
(Ontario) McMaster Marauders (Warriner) 🔨	3	0	1	0	3	0	0	0	2	0	9

Sheet D	1	2	3	4	5	6	7	8	9	10	11	Final
(British Columbia) Victoria Vikes (Harris) 🔨	1	0	3	0	2	0	1	2	0	1	0	10
(Ontario) Laurentian Voyageurs (Croisier)	0	2	0	2	0	3	0	0	3	0	1	11

Sheet G	1	2	3	4	5	6	7	8	9	10	Final
(New Brunswick) Mount Allison Mounties (Wynter) 🔨	0	0	1	0	0	0	0	0	X	X	1
(Nova Scotia) Dalhousie Tigers (MacNutt)	2	1	0	1	0	1	3	2	X	X	10

Sheet H	1	2	3	4	5	6	7	8	9	10	Final
Alberta Pandas (Gray-Withers) 🔨	2	0	2	0	1	0	3	1	0	X	9
(New Brunswick) UNB Reds (Campbell)	0	2	0	2	0	1	0	0	1	X	6

==== Draw 3 ====
Wednesday, March 13, 8:30 am

Sheet B	1	2	3	4	5	6	7	8	9	10	Final
(Ontario) Laurentian Voyageurs (Croisier)	0	0	1	0	2	0	1	1	0	X	5
Alberta Pandas (Gray-Withers) 🔨	2	3	0	1	0	1	0	0	3	X	10

Sheet C	1	2	3	4	5	6	7	8	9	10	Final
(Nova Scotia) Dalhousie Tigers (MacNutt)	1	0	2	1	0	0	1	1	0	2	8
(Ontario) Waterloo Warriors (Evans) 🔨	0	1	0	0	2	3	0	0	3	0	9

Sheet E	1	2	3	4	5	6	7	8	9	10	Final
(Ontario) McMaster Marauders (Warriner) 🔨	1	0	2	1	1	0	0	2	0	X	7
(New Brunswick) Mount Allison Mounties (Wynter)	0	1	0	0	0	1	1	0	1	X	4

Sheet G	1	2	3	4	5	6	7	8	9	10	Final
(New Brunswick) UNB Reds (Campbell)	0	0	3	0	1	0	0	1	0	X	5
(British Columbia) Victoria Vikes (Harris) 🔨	0	2	0	1	0	2	3	0	2	X	10

==== Draw 5 ====
Wednesday, March 13, 4:30 pm

Sheet A	1	2	3	4	5	6	7	8	9	10	Final
(New Brunswick) UNB Reds (Campbell)	0	1	0	2	0	3	2	0	3	X	11
(Nova Scotia) Dalhousie Tigers (MacNutt) 🔨	2	0	1	0	2	0	0	1	0	X	6

Sheet C	1	2	3	4	5	6	7	8	9	10	Final
Alberta Pandas (Gray-Withers) 🔨	2	0	2	4	1	0	3	X	X	X	12
(New Brunswick) Mount Allison Mounties (Wynter)	0	1	0	0	0	1	0	X	X	X	2

Sheet F	1	2	3	4	5	6	7	8	9	10	Final
(Ontario) Laurentian Voyageurs (Croisier)	0	0	0	1	0	0	0	2	X	X	3
(Ontario) McMaster Marauders (Warriner) 🔨	0	0	3	0	2	3	2	0	X	X	10

Sheet H	1	2	3	4	5	6	7	8	9	10	Final
(British Columbia) Victoria Vikes (Harris)	0	1	0	0	1	1	0	0	0	X	3
(Ontario) Waterloo Warriors (Evans) 🔨	1	0	2	2	0	0	1	0	2	X	8

==== Draw 7 ====
Thursday, March 14, 8:30 am

Sheet A	1	2	3	4	5	6	7	8	9	10	Final
(Ontario) Waterloo Warriors (Evans)	0	1	0	1	0	0	1	1	0	X	4
Alberta Pandas (Gray-Withers) 🔨	2	0	4	0	0	2	0	0	1	X	9

Sheet D	1	2	3	4	5	6	7	8	9	10	Final
(Ontario) McMaster Marauders (Warriner) 🔨	0	1	0	1	3	0	2	1	0	X	8
(New Brunswick) UNB Reds (Campbell)	0	0	4	0	0	1	0	0	1	X	6

Sheet E	1	2	3	4	5	6	7	8	9	10	Final
(Nova Scotia) Dalhousie Tigers (MacNutt) 🔨	2	0	1	0	0	0	2	2	0	1	8
(Ontario) Laurentian Voyageurs (Croisier)	0	2	0	1	2	0	0	0	1	0	6

Sheet F	1	2	3	4	5	6	7	8	9	10	Final
(New Brunswick) Mount Allison Mounties (Wynter) 🔨	4	0	0	1	1	0	0	1	2	1	10
(British Columbia) Victoria Vikes (Harris)	0	4	3	0	0	1	1	0	0	0	9

==== Draw 9 ====
Thursday, March 14, 4:30 pm

Sheet C	1	2	3	4	5	6	7	8	9	10	Final
(Ontario) Laurentian Voyageurs (Croisier) 🔨	1	1	0	2	0	1	0	0	1	0	6
(New Brunswick) UNB Reds (Campbell)	0	0	1	0	1	0	3	2	0	1	8

Sheet D	1	2	3	4	5	6	7	8	9	10	Final
(New Brunswick) Mount Allison Mounties (Wynter)	0	1	0	2	1	0	0	2	0	X	6
(Ontario) Waterloo Warriors (Evans) 🔨	1	0	2	0	0	2	1	0	4	X	10

Sheet E	1	2	3	4	5	6	7	8	9	10	Final
Alberta Pandas (Gray-Withers) 🔨	1	0	2	0	0	3	0	0	2	X	8
(British Columbia) Victoria Vikes (Harris)	0	1	0	0	1	0	1	1	0	X	4

Sheet H	1	2	3	4	5	6	7	8	9	10	Final
(Ontario) McMaster Marauders (Warriner) 🔨	1	0	0	1	1	0	2	0	0	0	5
(Nova Scotia) Dalhousie Tigers (MacNutt)	0	2	1	0	0	2	0	1	1	1	8

==== Draw 12 ====
Friday, March 15, 12:30 pm

Sheet A	1	2	3	4	5	6	7	8	9	10	Final
(Ontario) Laurentian Voyageurs (Croisier)	0	0	0	1	0	0	3	0	2	X	6
(New Brunswick) Mount Allison Mounties (Wynter) 🔨	0	1	0	0	0	2	0	1	0	X	4

Sheet B	1	2	3	4	5	6	7	8	9	10	Final
(British Columbia) Victoria Vikes (Harris)	0	0	0	2	0	1	0	1	X	X	4
(Nova Scotia) Dalhousie Tigers (MacNutt) 🔨	0	1	0	0	3	0	5	0	X	X	9

Sheet F	1	2	3	4	5	6	7	8	9	10	Final
(New Brunswick) UNB Reds (Campbell) 🔨	0	1	0	1	0	1	1	1	1	X	6
(Ontario) Waterloo Warriors (Evans)	0	0	1	0	1	0	0	0	0	X	2

Sheet G	1	2	3	4	5	6	7	8	9	10	Final
Alberta Pandas (Gray-Withers)	1	0	2	0	1	2	0	0	4	0	10
(Ontario) McMaster Marauders (Warriner) 🔨	0	1	0	3	0	0	1	2	0	1	8

==== Draw 14 ====
Friday, March 15, 8:30 pm

Sheet A	1	2	3	4	5	6	7	8	9	10	Final
(British Columbia) Victoria Vikes (Harris)	0	0	0	1	0	1	2	0	2	1	7
(Ontario) McMaster Marauders (Warriner) 🔨	0	1	1	0	1	0	0	2	0	0	5

Sheet B	1	2	3	4	5	6	7	8	9	10	Final
(New Brunswick) UNB Reds (Campbell) 🔨	1	0	0	2	0	0	0	0	1	3	7
(New Brunswick) Mount Allison Mounties (Wynter)	0	2	0	0	1	1	1	1	0	0	6

Sheet F	1	2	3	4	5	6	7	8	9	10	Final
(Nova Scotia) Dalhousie Tigers (MacNutt) 🔨	1	0	0	0	0	2	1	0	1	1	6
Alberta Pandas (Gray-Withers)	0	3	1	1	1	0	0	1	0	0	7

Sheet G	1	2	3	4	5	6	7	8	9	10	Final
(Ontario) Waterloo Warriors (Evans) 🔨	0	0	3	0	0	0	0	1	0	X	4
(Ontario) Laurentian Voyageurs (Croisier)	0	0	0	1	1	2	1	0	2	X	7

=== Playoffs ===
Semifinal
1	Alberta Pandas	8
4	(Nova Scotia) Dalhousie Tigers	3
2	(New Brunswick) UNB Reds	7
3	(Ontario) Waterloo Warriors	12

Final
1	Alberta Pandas	10
3	(Ontario) Waterloo Warriors	7
Bronze medal game
4	(Nova Scotia) Dalhousie Tigers	9
2	(New Brunswick) UNB Reds	2

==== Semifinals ====
Saturday, March 16, 9:30 am

Sheet C	1	2	3	4	5	6	7	8	9	10	Final
Alberta Pandas (Gray-Withers) 🔨	2	0	0	0	2	2	0	0	2	X	8
(Nova Scotia) Dalhousie Tigers (MacNutt)	0	0	0	0	0	0	2	1	0	X	3

Sheet H	1	2	3	4	5	6	7	8	9	10	Final
(New Brunswick) UNB Reds (Campbell) 🔨	1	0	3	0	1	0	2	0	X	X	7
(Ontario) Waterloo Warriors (Evans)	0	5	0	2	0	2	0	3	X	X	12

==== Bronze medal game ====
Saturday, March 16, 2:30 pm

Sheet G	1	2	3	4	5	6	7	8	9	10	Final
(Nova Scotia) Dalhousie Tigers (MacNutt) 🔨	1	1	0	3	4	0	X	X	X	X	9
(New Brunswick) UNB Reds (Campbell)	0	0	1	0	0	1	X	X	X	X	2

==== Final ====
Saturday, March 16, 2:30 pm

Sheet D	1	2	3	4	5	6	7	8	9	10	Final
Alberta Pandas (Gray-Withers) 🔨	0	0	2	0	3	0	3	0	0	2	10
(Ontario) Waterloo Warriors (Evans)	1	1	0	1	0	1	0	1	2	0	7

=== Final standings ===
Place	Team
1st place, gold medalist(s)	Alberta Pandas
2nd place, silver medalist(s)	(Ontario) Waterloo Warriors
3rd place, bronze medalist(s)	(Nova Scotia) Dalhousie Tigers
4	(New Brunswick) UNB Reds
5	(Ontario) McMaster Marauders
6	(Ontario) Laurentian Voyageurs
7	(British Columbia) Victoria Vikes
8	(New Brunswick) Mount Allison Mounties
