= Zoe Cinnamon =

Canadian curler

- Curler
- Born: January 27, 2002 (age 24); Calgary, Alberta

Team
- Curling club: Saville Community SC, Edmonton, AB
- Skip: Serena Gray-Withers
- Third: Catherine Clifford
- Second: Laura Walker
- Lead: Zoe Cinnamon
- Mixed doubles partner: Johnson Tao

Curling career
- Member Association: Alberta
- Top CTRS ranking: 5th (2025–26)
Medal record
Curling
Representing Canada
World University Games
| Bronze medal – third place | 2025 Turin | Team |
Representing Alberta
Canadian Mixed Doubles Championship
| Silver medal – second place | 2026 Surrey | Mixed doubles |

Zoe Cinnamon (born January 27, 2002, in Calgary) is a Canadian curler from Cochrane, Alberta. She currently plays lead on Team Serena Gray-Withers and mixed doubles with Johnson Tao.

== Career ==
=== Youth ===
Cinnamon skipped her own team through her teen years, winning back-to-back high school provincial titles in 2018 and 2019. In 2020, skipping teammates Myla Plett, Raelyn Helston and Lauren Miller, she lost in the final of the Alberta provincial junior championship to Abby Marks.

After graduating high school, Cinnamon was recruited to the University of Alberta Pandas curling team where she played third on the junior team led by Serena Gray-Withers. In 2022, with Brianna Cullen and Anna Munroe on the front end, the team won the Alberta junior championship, defeating Olivia Jones 6–5 in the provincial final. This qualified the team for the 2022 Canadian Junior Curling Championships where they finished 5–3 in the round robin, enough to qualify for the playoffs. They then lost 7–4 to Ontario's Emily Deschenes in the quarterfinals, eliminating them in fifth place.

=== Women's ===
Aged out of juniors, Munroe left the team and was replaced by Catherine Clifford who joined at the third position, shifting Cinnamon to lead. This new lineup found immediate success, winning the inaugural U25 NextGen Classic and earning a berth into Curling Canada's NextGen Program. On the women's tour, the team found considerable success as a new team, winning the second event of the Alberta Curling Series and reaching the quarterfinals of the 2022 Saville Shoot-Out and the DeKalb Superspiel. They also competed in the 2022 Tour Challenge Tier 2 Grand Slam of Curling event where they finished 1–3. In the new year, the team represented the Alberta Pandas at the 2023 U Sports/Curling Canada University Curling Championships. Building on their success from the women's tour, the team reached the playoffs with a 4–3 record before defeating the Memorial Sea-Hawks and the Dalhousie Tigers in the semifinal and gold medal games to secure the title. Also during the 2022–23 season, Cinnamon joined Team Kelsey Rocque as their alternate at the 2023 Alberta Scotties Tournament of Hearts. The team missed the playoffs with a 4–3 record.

To begin the 2023–24 season, Team Gray-Withers defended their title at the U25 NextGen Classic. They also had a strong showing in their first tour event, the 2023 Saville Shootout, defeating the likes of Kerri Einarson and Gim Eun-ji en route to a semifinal finish. Because they won the U Sport title the season before, the team earned a berth into the 2023 PointsBet Invitational. There, they lost in the first round to Isabelle Ladouceur. Back on tour, the team reached the semifinals at the Saville Grand Prix and Ladies Alberta Open, however, failed to reach the playoffs at five other tour events, including the 2023 Tour Challenge Tier 2. Despite this, they earned enough points to qualify for the 2024 Alberta Scotties Tournament of Hearts. Entering as the second seeds, Team Gray-Withers had a strong performance, finishing the round robin with a 5–2 record and qualifying for the playoffs. They then faced Kayla Skrlik in the semifinal where they lost 9–8 in an extra end. To end the season, the team played in the 2024 U Sports/Curling Canada University Curling Championships after securing the Canada West title. There, the team ran the table with a perfect 9–0 record to secure their second consecutive title and qualify as Team Canada for the 2025 Winter World University Games the following season. Brianna Cullen left the team following the season and was replaced at second by Lindsey Burgess.

After climbing the ranks the last two seasons, Team Gray-Withers fell from ninth to twenty-fifth in the Canadian rankings during the 2024–25 season. This began with a third place finish at the U25 NextGen Classic after falling to Taylor Reese-Hansen in the semifinal. Following this, the team missed the playoffs at seven straight tour events, including the 2024 Tour Challenge Tier 2, and lost in the first round of the 2024 PointsBet Invitational. They turned things around in December by winning the second Alberta Curling Series event. The team then competed in the World University Games where they finished 7–2 through the round robin to advance to the playoffs. They then lost 6–5 to Japan's Yuina Miura in the semifinal but bounced back to beat Norway's Torild Bjørnstad in the bronze medal game. After failing to qualify for the 2025 U Sports/Curling Canada University Curling Championships due to a fourth place finish at the Canada West championship, the team ended the season by winning the Best of the West U30 event.

The 2025–26 season was a breakthrough season for the Gray-Withers rink as they climbed to number five on the CTRS standings. In August, the team won their third NextGen Classic title, defeating Mélodie Forsythe in the final. They then reached the semifinals of the 2025 Saville Shootout once again, losing out to Gim Eun-ji. The team then won back-to-back events at the Saville U25 Challenge and McKee Homes Fall Curling Classic before claiming the inaugural U25 Tour Challenge Grand Slam title. In November, the team lost in the final of the DeKalb Superspiel to Miyu Ueno and reached the semifinals of the Crestwood Anniversary Showdown. They also made it to the quarterfinals of the 2025 Canadian Open Tier 2 where they were defeated by Taylor Reese-Hansen. With all their playoff appearances throughout the fall, the team entered the 2026 Alberta Women's Curling Championship as the number one seeds and qualified for the playoffs through the A side, defeating second seed Selena Sturmay. They then beat Sturmay again in the 1 vs. 2 game to qualify for the final where they'd meet Sturmay for a third time. After giving up a steal of two in the third end, the team trailed throughout the rest of the game, ultimately losing 9–5 and finishing second. Team Gray-Withers ended their season at the Karuizawa International where they finished fourth. In March, the team announced they would be parting ways with Burgess and adding Laura Walker as their new second for the 2026–27 season.

=== Mixed doubles ===
Cinnamon found her first success in mixed doubles during the 2024–25 season with partner Johnson Tao. At the U25 NextGen Classic, the team reached the semifinals where they lost to Mackenzie Arbuckle and Aaron Macdonell. They also teamed up for an unbeaten run at the end of the season to win the World Open U25 Mixed Doubles Championship.

The following season, the pair made it to the semifinal round of the Saville Mixed Doubles Classic and finished 2–3 at the NextGen Classic. In the new year, the team had another strong showing at the Alberta mixed doubles championship, going undefeated to claim the provincial title. At the 2026 Canadian Mixed Doubles Curling Championship, the duo finished first in their pool with a 5–1 record, earning a direct bye to the quarterfinal round. They then came from behind in both their quarterfinal and semifinal matches to eliminate Melissa Adams and Alex Robichaud and Katie Ford and Oliver Campbell. This qualified them for the championship game where they came up short against teammate Serena Gray-Withers and Victor Pietrangelo 10–9, despite scoring six in the opening end.

To start the 2026–27 season, Cinnamon and Tao got their revenge on Gray-Withers and Pietrangelo by beating them in the final of the U25 NextGen Classic.

== Personal life ==
Cinnamon was born in Calgary and grew up in Cochrane, Alberta. She attended the University of Alberta where she was a bachelor of science student, majoring in earth & atmospheric science and minoring in human geography. She previously graduated from Cochrane High School. Her brother Max is also a curler.

== Teams ==
| Season | Skip | Third | Second | Lead |
|---|---|---|---|---|
| 2016–17 | Zoe Cinnamon | Elspeth Cooper | Avery Ingham | Keely Isinghood |
| 2017–18 | Zoe Cinnamon | Justine Hagey | Bell Cooper | Raelyn Helston |
| 2018–19 | Zoe Cinnamon | Justine Hagey | Elspeth Cooper | Raelyn Helston |
| 2019–20 | Zoe Cinnamon | Myla Plett | Raelyn Helston | Lauren Miller |
| 2020–21 | Serena Gray-Withers | Zoe Cinnamon | Brianna Cullen | Emma Wiens |
| 2021–22 | Serena Gray-Withers | Zoe Cinnamon | Brianna Cullen | Anna Munroe |
| 2022–23 | Serena Gray-Withers | Catherine Clifford | Brianna Cullen | Zoe Cinnamon |
| 2023–24 | Serena Gray-Withers | Catherine Clifford | Brianna Cullen | Zoe Cinnamon |
| 2024–25 | Serena Gray-Withers | Catherine Clifford | Lindsey Burgess | Zoe Cinnamon |
| 2025–26 | Serena Gray-Withers | Catherine Clifford | Lindsey Burgess | Zoe Cinnamon |
| 2026–27 | Serena Gray-Withers | Catherine Clifford | Laura Walker | Zoe Cinnamon |
