= Serena Gray-Withers =

Canadian curler

- Curler
- Born: July 22, 2001 (age 25); Winnipeg, Manitoba

Team
- Curling club: Saville Community SC, Edmonton, AB
- Skip: Serena Gray-Withers
- Third: Catherine Clifford
- Second: Laura Walker
- Lead: Zoe Cinnamon
- Mixed doubles partner: Victor Pietrangelo

Curling career
- Member Association: Manitoba (2016–2020); Alberta (2020–present)
- World Mixed Doubles Championship: 1 (2027)
- Top CTRS ranking: 5th (2025–26)
Medal record
Curling
Representing Canada
World University Games
| Bronze medal – third place | 2025 Turin | Team |
Representing Alberta
Canadian Mixed Doubles Championship
| Gold medal – first place | 2026 Surrey | Mixed doubles |

Serena Marguerite Gray-Withers (born July 22, 2001, in Winnipeg) is a Canadian curler from Edmonton, Alberta. She currently skips her own team out of the Saville Community Sports Centre. She also plays mixed doubles with Victor Pietrangelo.

== Career ==
=== Juniors ===
Gray-Withers won her first provincial championship at the 2020 Manitoba U18 championship, playing third for Meghan Walter. This would have qualified the team for the 2020 Canadian U18 Curling Championship, however, the event was cancelled due to the COVID-19 pandemic. Also that season, she skipped her team junior team of Kathryn and Brianna Cullen and Lane Prokopowich to the finals of the U21 provincial championship where she lost to Mackenzie Zacharias who went on to win the 2020 Canadian and World Junior Championships.

After graduating high school, Gray-Withers was recruited to the University of Alberta Pandas where she began skipping the junior team. In 2022, she led her team of Zoe Cinnamon, Brianna Cullen and Anna Munroe to victory at the Alberta junior championship, defeating Olivia Jones 6–5 in the provincial final. This qualified the team for the 2022 Canadian Junior Curling Championships where they finished 5–3 in the round robin, enough to qualify for the playoffs. They then lost 7–4 to Ontario's Emily Deschenes in the quarterfinals, eliminating them in fifth place.

=== Women's ===
Aged out of juniors, Munroe left the team and was replaced by Catherine Clifford who joined at the third position, shifting Cinnamon to lead. This new lineup found immediate success, winning the inaugural U25 NextGen Classic and earning a berth into Curling Canada's NextGen Program. On the women's tour, the team found considerable success as a new team, winning the second event of the Alberta Curling Series and reaching the quarterfinals of the 2022 Saville Shoot-Out and the DeKalb Superspiel. They also competed in the 2022 Tour Challenge Tier 2 Grand Slam of Curling event where they finished 1–3. In the new year, Gray-Withers joined the Abby Marks rink as their alternate at the 2023 Winter World University Games after the team won the 2022 World University Games Qualifier. There, the team finished 4–5 through the round robin, not enough to advance to the playoffs. At the end of the season, Gray-Withers skipped the Pandas at the 2023 U Sports/Curling Canada University Curling Championships. Building on their success from the women's tour, the team reached the playoffs with a 4–3 record before defeating the Memorial Sea-Hawks and the Dalhousie Tigers in the semifinal and gold medal games to secure the title.

To begin the 2023–24 season, Team Gray-Withers defended their title at the U25 NextGen Classic. They also had a strong showing in their first tour event, the 2023 Saville Shootout, defeating the likes of Kerri Einarson and Gim Eun-ji en route to a semifinal finish. Because they won the U Sport title the season before, the team earned a berth into the 2023 PointsBet Invitational. There, they lost in the first round to Isabelle Ladouceur. Back on tour, the team reached the semifinals at the Saville Grand Prix and Ladies Alberta Open, however, failed to reach the playoffs at five other tour events, including the 2023 Tour Challenge Tier 2. Despite this, they earned enough points to qualify for the 2024 Alberta Scotties Tournament of Hearts, their first appearance at the provincial women's championship. Entering as the second seeds, Team Gray-Withers had a strong performance, finishing the round robin with a 5–2 record and qualifying for the playoffs. They then faced Kayla Skrlik in the semifinal where they lost 9–8 in an extra end. To end the season, the team played in the 2024 U Sports/Curling Canada University Curling Championships after securing the Canada West title. There, the team ran the table with a perfect 9–0 record to secure their second consecutive title and qualify as Team Canada for the 2025 Winter World University Games the following season. Brianna Cullen left the team following the season and was replaced at second by Lindsey Burgess.

After climbing the ranks the last two seasons, Team Gray-Withers fell from ninth to twenty-fifth in the Canadian rankings during the 2024–25 season. This began with a third place finish at the U25 NextGen Classic after falling to Taylor Reese-Hansen in the semifinal. Following this, the team missed the playoffs at seven straight tour events, including the 2024 Tour Challenge Tier 2, and lost in the first round of the 2024 PointsBet Invitational. They turned things around in December by winning the second Alberta Curling Series event. The team then competed in the World University Games where they finished 7–2 through the round robin to advance to the playoffs. They then lost 6–5 to Japan's Yuina Miura in the semifinal but bounced back to beat Norway's Torild Bjørnstad in the bronze medal game. After failing to qualify for the 2025 U Sports/Curling Canada University Curling Championships due to a fourth place finish at the Canada West championship, the team ended the season by winning the Best of the West U30 event.

The 2025–26 season was a breakthrough season for the Gray-Withers rink as they climbed to number five on the CTRS standings. In August, the team won their third NextGen Classic title, defeating Mélodie Forsythe in the final. They then reached the semifinals of the 2025 Saville Shootout once again, losing out to Gim Eun-ji. The team then won back-to-back events at the Saville U25 Challenge and McKee Homes Fall Curling Classic before claiming the inaugural U25 Tour Challenge Grand Slam title. In November, the team lost in the final of the DeKalb Superspiel to Miyu Ueno and reached the semifinals of the Crestwood Anniversary Showdown. They also made it to the quarterfinals of the 2025 Canadian Open Tier 2 where they were defeated by Taylor Reese-Hansen. With all their playoff appearances throughout the fall, the team entered the 2026 Alberta Women's Curling Championship as the number one seeds and qualified for the playoffs through the A side, defeating second seed Selena Sturmay. They then beat Sturmay again in the 1 vs. 2 game to qualify for the final where they'd meet Sturmay for a third time. After giving up a steal of two in the third end, the team trailed throughout the rest of the game, ultimately losing 9–5 and finishing second. Team Gray-Withers ended their season at the Karuizawa International where they finished fourth. In March, the team announced they would be parting ways with Burgess and adding Laura Walker as their new second for the 2026–27 season.

=== Mixed doubles ===
Gray-Withers found her first success in mixed doubles in 2022 with partner Andrew Gittis. At the U25 NextGen Classic, the team reached the semifinals where they lost to Paige Papley and Evan van Amsterdam. Later during the 2022–23 season, she won the Alberta U21 Mixed Doubles Championship with Ky Macaulay. Two seasons later, Gray-Withers teamed up with Andrew Nowell to reach the quarterfinals of the U25 NextGen Classic and the semifinals of the World Open U25 Mixed Doubles Championship.

For the 2025–26 season, Gray-Withers joined forces with Victor Pietrangelo who previously won two NextGen titles and a bronze medal at the Winter University Games in mixed doubles. This pair had a strong start to the season, winning the 2025 U25 NextGen Classic with an undefeated 8–0 record. They then played in the Saville Mixed Doubles Classic where they had an undefeated run until the final, losing to eventual Olympic silver medalists Cory Thiesse and Korey Dropkin. In March, the duo played in the 2026 Canadian Mixed Doubles Curling Championship after earning enough points to qualify through the Canadian Mixed Doubles rankings. Through the round robin, the pair finished with a 4–2 record, enough to qualify for the knockout round. After beating Nancy Martin and Rylan Kleiter in the round of 12, they came from behind in both their quarterfinal and semifinal matches to eliminate Kira Brunton and Jacob Horgan and Rachel Homan and Brendan Bottcher. This qualified them for the championship game against teammate Zoe Cinnamon and Johnson Tao where Gray-Withers and Pietrangelo gave up six points in the first end. Despite this, the pair pulled off their third straight come from behind victory, scoring three in the eighth end to win the game 10–9 and earn the right to represent Canada at the 2027 World Mixed Doubles Curling Championship.

To start the 2026–27 season, Gray-Withers and Pietrangelo lost in a rematch to Cinnamon and Tao in the final of the U25 NextGen Classic.

== Personal life ==
Gray-Withers was born in Winnipeg and grew up in Rosewood, Manitoba. She attended St. Mary's Academy. She currently resides in Edmonton. She attended the University of Alberta where she was a bachelor of commerce & marketing student.

== Grand Slam record ==
Key
| C | Champion |
| F | Lost in Final |
| SF | Lost in Semifinal |
| QF | Lost in Quarterfinals |
| R16 | Lost in the round of 16 |
| Q | Did not advance to playoffs |
| T2 | Played in Tier 2 event |
| DNP | Did not participate in event |
| N/A | Not a Grand Slam event that season |

| Event | 2022–23 | 2023–24 | 2024–25 | 2025–26 | 2026–27 |
|---|---|---|---|---|---|
| Invitational | T2 | T2 | T2 | U25 | DNP |
| Masters | DNP | DNP | DNP | DNP | Q |
| Open | DNP | DNP | DNP | T2 | |

== Teams ==
| Season | Skip | Third | Second | Lead |
|---|---|---|---|---|
| 2016–17 | Serena Gray-Withers | Erica Wiebe | Caitlyn Labossiere | Jada Pantel |
| 2017–18 | Serena Gray-Withers | Erica Wiebe | Caitlyn Labossiere | Jada Pantel |
| 2018–19 | Serena Gray-Withers | Kathryn Cullen | Brianna Cullen | Lane Prokopowich |
| 2019–20 | Serena Gray-Withers | Kathryn Cullen | Brianna Cullen | Lane Prokopowich |
| 2020–21 | Serena Gray-Withers | Zoe Cinnamon | Brianna Cullen | Emma Wiens |
| 2021–22 | Serena Gray-Withers | Zoe Cinnamon | Brianna Cullen | Anna Munroe |
| 2022–23 | Serena Gray-Withers | Catherine Clifford | Brianna Cullen | Zoe Cinnamon |
| 2023–24 | Serena Gray-Withers | Catherine Clifford | Brianna Cullen | Zoe Cinnamon |
| 2024–25 | Serena Gray-Withers | Catherine Clifford | Lindsey Burgess | Zoe Cinnamon |
| 2025–26 | Serena Gray-Withers | Catherine Clifford | Lindsey Burgess | Zoe Cinnamon |
| 2026–27 | Serena Gray-Withers | Catherine Clifford | Laura Walker | Zoe Cinnamon |
