= 2025 U Sports/Curling Canada University Curling Championships =

2025 U Sports/Curling Canada Championships
- Host city: Lethbridge, Alberta
- Arena: Lethbridge Curling Club
- Dates: February 24–28
- Men's winner: (Ontario) Wilfrid Laurier Golden Hawks
- Skip: Kibo Mulima
- Third: Wyatt Small
- Second: Wyatt Wright
- Lead: Nathan Kim
- Alternate: Adam Moor
- Coach: Matthew Wilkinson
- Finalist: (Ontario) Carleton Ravens (Nicholls)
- Women's winner: (Ontario) Wilfrid Laurier Golden Hawks
- Skip: Emma Artichuk
- Third: Sarah Bailey
- Second: Scotia Maltman
- Lead: Tori Zemmelink
- Alternate: Logan Shaw
- Coach: John Gabel
- Finalist: (Ontario) McMaster Marauders (Fitzgerald)

The 2025 U Sports/Curling Canada University Championships were held from February 24 to 28 at the Lethbridge Curling Club in Lethbridge, Alberta. The host university of the event was the University of Lethbridge. The event was held in conjunction with the 2025 CCAA/Curling Canada College Curling Championships, the Canadian college curling championship.

== Men ==
=== Qualification ===
The following universities qualified to participate in the 2025 U Sports/Curling Canada University Curling Championships:

Region	Vacancies	Qualified
Host	1	(Alberta) Lethbridge Pronghorns
Canada West Universities Athletic Association	2	(Saskatchewan) Regina Cougars (Alberta) Calgary Dinos
Ontario University Athletics	3	(Ontario) Carleton Ravens (Ontario) Wilfrid Laurier Golden Hawks (Ontario) Brock Badgers
Atlantic University Sport	2	(Newfoundland and Labrador) Memorial Sea-Hawks (New Brunswick) UNB Reds
TOTAL	8	

=== Teams ===
The teams are listed as follows:

Team	Skip	Third	Second	Lead	Alternate	University
Brock Badgers	Owen Henry	Victor Pietrangelo	Graham Dix	Patrick Sipura	Daniel Krowchuk	(Ontario) Brock University
Calgary Dinos	Kenan Wipf	Ky Macaulay	Michael Keenan	Max Cinnamon	Ethan Drysdale	(Alberta) University of Calgary
Carleton Ravens	Owen Nicholls	Jordan McNamara	Jack Ragan	Jacob Clarke	Philip Burgess	(Ontario) Carleton University
Lethbridge Pronghorns	Sam Nygaard	Brad Pike	Ryan Hennessey	Keaton Zeidell	Ethan Taylor	(Alberta) University of Lethbridge
Memorial Sea-Hawks	Simon Perry	Nicholas Codner	Brayden Snow	Sean O'Leary		(Newfoundland and Labrador) Memorial University of Newfoundland
Regina Cougars	Josh Bryden	Adam Bukurak	Carter Williamson	Ayden Wittmire	Ryan Grabarczyk	(Saskatchewan) University of Regina
UNB Reds	Jamie Stewart	Sean Beland	Aden Kavanaugh	Loris Elliott	Luke Robichaud	University of New Brunswick
Wilfrid Laurier Golden Hawks	Kibo Mulima	Wyatt Small	Wyatt Wright	Nathan Kim	Adam Moor	(Ontario) Wilfrid Laurier University

=== Round robin standings ===
Final Round Robin Standings

Key
Teams to Playoffs

Team	Skip	W	L	W–L	PF	PA	EW	EL	BE	SE	LSD
(Newfoundland and Labrador) Memorial Sea-Hawks	Simon Perry	5	2	1–0	40	26	24	19	6	9	550.5
(Ontario) Wilfrid Laurier Golden Hawks	Kibo Mulima	5	2	0–1	52	31	27	17	1	10	355.4
(New Brunswick) UNB Reds	Jamie Stewart	4	3	2–1; 1–0	36	39	22	22	3	6	477.8
(Ontario) Carleton Ravens	Owen Nicholls	4	3	2–1; 0–1	40	34	23	21	2	7	492.3
(Alberta) Calgary Dinos	Kenan Wipf	4	3	1–2; 1–0	40	34	20	19	4	7	689.5
(Ontario) Brock Badgers	Owen Henry	4	3	1–2; 0–1	36	28	19	18	10	5	416.9
(Saskatchewan) Regina Cougars	Josh Bryden	2	5	–	31	40	17	24	7	3	758.0
(Alberta) Lethbridge Pronghorns	Sam Nygaard	0	7	–	19	62	15	27	2	3	1554.3

Round Robin Summary Table
Pos.	Team	(Ontario) BRO	(Alberta) CGY	(Ontario) CAR	(Alberta) LET	(Newfoundland and Labrador) MUN	(Saskatchewan) REG	(New Brunswick) UNB	(Ontario) WLU	Record
6	(Ontario) Brock Badgers	—	3–8	4–7	12–1	4–3	4–2	6–1	3–6	4–3
5	(Alberta) Calgary Dinos	8–3	—	4–9	7–1	4–8	7–2	4–6	6–5	4–3
4	(Ontario) Carleton Ravens	7–4	9–4	—	8–2	2–5	5–4	4–9	5–6	4–3
8	(Alberta) Lethbridge Pronghorns	1–12	1–7	2–8	—	4–7	6–9	3–6	2–13	0–7
1	(Newfoundland and Labrador) Memorial Sea-Hawks	3–4	8–4	5–2	7–4	—	6–3	5–6	6–3	5–2
7	(Saskatchewan) Regina Cougars	2–4	2–7	4–5	9–6	3–6	—	7–3	4–9	2–5
3	(New Brunswick) UNB Reds	1–6	6–4	9–4	6–3	6–5	3–7	—	5–10	4–3
2	(Ontario) Wilfrid Laurier Golden Hawks	6–3	5–6	6–5	13–2	3–6	9–4	10–5	—	5–2

=== Round robin results ===
All draws are listed in Mountain Time (UTC−07:00).

==== Draw 2 ====
Monday, February 24, 9:00 pm

Sheet B	1	2	3	4	5	6	7	8	Final
(New Brunswick) UNB Reds (Stewart)	0	1	0	2	0	2	0	X	5
(Ontario) Wilfrid Laurier Golden Hawks (Mulima)	2	0	2	0	1	0	5	X	10

Sheet D	1	2	3	4	5	6	7	8	Final
(Newfoundland and Labrador) Memorial Sea-Hawks (Perry)	3	0	0	0	3	1	0	X	7
(Alberta) Lethbridge Pronghorns (Nygaard)	0	0	1	1	0	0	2	X	4

Sheet G	1	2	3	4	5	6	7	8	9	Final
(Saskatchewan) Regina Cougars (Bryden)	0	2	0	2	0	0	0	0	0	4
(Ontario) Carleton Ravens (Nicholls)	0	0	1	0	2	0	0	1	1	5

Sheet H	1	2	3	4	5	6	7	8	Final
(Ontario) Brock Badgers (Henry)	0	0	1	0	0	2	0	X	3
(Alberta) Calgary Dinos (Wipf)	0	0	0	2	2	0	4	X	8

==== Draw 4 ====
Tuesday, February 25, 12:30 pm

Sheet B	1	2	3	4	5	6	7	8	Final
(Alberta) Lethbridge Pronghorns (Nygaard)	0	0	0	0	0	1	X	X	1
(Alberta) Calgary Dinos (Wipf)	2	1	2	1	1	0	X	X	7

Sheet C	1	2	3	4	5	6	7	8	Final
(Ontario) Carleton Ravens (Nicholls)	1	0	2	0	1	0	0	X	4
(New Brunswick) UNB Reds (Stewart)	0	3	0	3	0	2	1	X	9

Sheet E	1	2	3	4	5	6	7	8	Final
(Ontario) Wilfrid Laurier Golden Hawks (Mulima)	2	0	2	0	1	0	4	X	9
(Saskatchewan) Regina Cougars (Bryden)	0	0	0	1	0	3	0	X	4

Sheet G	1	2	3	4	5	6	7	8	Final
(Ontario) Brock Badgers (Henry)	0	1	0	0	1	0	0	2	4
(Newfoundland and Labrador) Memorial Sea-Hawks (Perry)	0	0	1	1	0	1	0	0	3

==== Draw 6 ====
Tuesday, February 25, 8:30 pm

Sheet A	1	2	3	4	5	6	7	8	Final
(Ontario) Brock Badgers (Henry)	1	0	0	0	2	0	1	0	4
(Ontario) Carleton Ravens (Nicholls)	0	1	1	1	0	3	0	1	7

Sheet C	1	2	3	4	5	6	7	8	Final
(Alberta) Calgary Dinos (Wipf)	0	0	6	0	0	1	X	X	7
(Saskatchewan) Regina Cougars (Bryden)	0	1	0	1	0	0	X	X	2

Sheet F	1	2	3	4	5	6	7	8	Final
(Alberta) Lethbridge Pronghorns (Nygaard)	0	0	1	0	0	1	X	X	2
(Ontario) Wilfrid Laurier Golden Hawks (Mulima)	4	2	0	2	5	0	X	X	13

Sheet H	1	2	3	4	5	6	7	8	Final
(Newfoundland and Labrador) Memorial Sea-Hawks (Perry)	1	0	0	0	3	0	1	0	5
(New Brunswick) UNB Reds (Stewart)	0	1	0	2	0	1	0	2	6

==== Draw 8 ====
Wednesday, February 26, 12:30 pm

Sheet A	1	2	3	4	5	6	7	8	Final
(New Brunswick) UNB Reds (Stewart)	0	2	0	0	2	0	2	X	6
(Alberta) Calgary Dinos (Wipf)	1	0	0	1	0	2	0	X	4

Sheet D	1	2	3	4	5	6	7	8	Final
(Ontario) Wilfrid Laurier Golden Hawks (Mulima)	0	0	2	0	2	0	0	2	6
(Ontario) Brock Badgers (Henry)	1	0	0	2	0	0	0	0	3

Sheet E	1	2	3	4	5	6	7	8	Final
(Ontario) Carleton Ravens (Nicholls)	4	1	0	0	3	0	X	X	8
(Alberta) Lethbridge Pronghorns (Nygaard)	0	0	2	0	0	0	X	X	2

Sheet F	1	2	3	4	5	6	7	8	Final
(Saskatchewan) Regina Cougars (Bryden)	0	0	2	0	0	0	1	0	3
(Newfoundland and Labrador) Memorial Sea-Hawks (Perry)	1	1	0	1	0	2	0	1	6

==== Draw 10 ====
Wednesday, February 26, 8:30 pm

Sheet C	1	2	3	4	5	6	7	8	Final
(Alberta) Lethbridge Pronghorns (Nygaard)	0	1	0	0	0	0	X	X	1
(Ontario) Brock Badgers (Henry)	4	0	0	2	2	4	X	X	12

Sheet D	1	2	3	4	5	6	7	8	Final
(Saskatchewan) Regina Cougars (Bryden)	0	0	2	0	0	0	2	3	7
(New Brunswick) UNB Reds (Stewart)	1	1	0	0	1	0	0	0	3

Sheet E	1	2	3	4	5	6	7	8	Final
(Alberta) Calgary Dinos (Wipf)	0	2	1	0	0	1	0	X	4
(Newfoundland and Labrador) Memorial Sea-Hawks (Perry)	1	0	0	3	0	0	4	X	8

Sheet H	1	2	3	4	5	6	7	8	Final
(Ontario) Wilfrid Laurier Golden Hawks (Mulima)	1	0	1	0	2	1	0	1	6
(Ontario) Carleton Ravens (Nicholls)	0	2	0	2	0	0	1	0	5

==== Draw 11 ====
Thursday, February 27, 8:30 am

Sheet A	1	2	3	4	5	6	7	8	Final
(Alberta) Lethbridge Pronghorns (Nygaard)	1	0	2	0	2	1	0	0	6
(Saskatchewan) Regina Cougars (Bryden)	0	3	0	2	0	0	2	2	9

Sheet B	1	2	3	4	5	6	7	8	Final
(Newfoundland and Labrador) Memorial Sea-Hawks (Perry)	0	1	1	2	0	0	0	1	5
(Ontario) Carleton Ravens (Nicholls)	0	0	0	0	1	1	0	0	2

Sheet F	1	2	3	4	5	6	7	8	Final
(Ontario) Brock Badgers (Henry)	3	0	2	0	0	1	X	X	6
(New Brunswick) UNB Reds (Stewart)	0	1	0	0	0	0	X	X	1

Sheet G	1	2	3	4	5	6	7	8	Final
(Alberta) Calgary Dinos (Wipf)	0	0	4	0	0	2	0	0	6
(Ontario) Wilfrid Laurier Golden Hawks (Mulima)	0	1	0	1	1	0	1	1	5

==== Draw 13 ====
Thursday, February 27, 4:30 pm

Sheet A	1	2	3	4	5	6	7	8	Final
(Newfoundland and Labrador) Memorial Sea-Hawks (Perry)	2	0	0	0	0	0	2	2	6
(Ontario) Wilfrid Laurier Golden Hawks (Mulima)	0	2	0	0	1	0	0	0	3

Sheet B	1	2	3	4	5	6	7	8	Final
(Ontario) Brock Badgers (Henry)	0	0	2	2	0	0	0	X	4
(Saskatchewan) Regina Cougars (Bryden)	0	0	0	0	1	0	1	X	2

Sheet F	1	2	3	4	5	6	7	8	Final
(Ontario) Carleton Ravens (Nicholls)	0	4	0	2	0	3	X	X	9
(Alberta) Calgary Dinos (Wipf)	0	0	2	0	2	0	X	X	4

Sheet G	1	2	3	4	5	6	7	8	Final
(New Brunswick) UNB Reds (Stewart)	2	2	0	1	1	0	0	X	6
(Alberta) Lethbridge Pronghorns (Nygaard)	0	0	1	0	0	1	1	X	3

=== Playoffs ===
Semifinal
1	(Newfoundland and Labrador) Memorial Sea-Hawks	3
4	(Ontario) Carleton Ravens	6
2	(Ontario) Wilfrid Laurier Golden Hawks	8
3	(New Brunswick) UNB Reds	2

Final
4	(Ontario) Carleton Ravens	4
2	(Ontario) Wilfrid Laurier Golden Hawks	7
Bronze medal game
1	(Newfoundland and Labrador) Memorial Sea-Hawks	6
3	(New Brunswick) UNB Reds	5

==== Semifinals ====
Friday, February 28, 9:30 am

Sheet C	1	2	3	4	5	6	7	8	Final
(Ontario) Wilfrid Laurier Golden Hawks (Mulima)	2	1	2	0	0	3	X	X	8
(New Brunswick) UNB Reds (Stewart)	0	0	0	0	2	0	X	X	2

Sheet D	1	2	3	4	5	6	7	8	Final
(Newfoundland and Labrador) Memorial Sea-Hawks (Perry)	0	1	0	1	0	0	1	0	3
(Ontario) Carleton Ravens (Nicholls)	1	0	2	0	0	2	0	1	6

==== Bronze medal game ====
Friday, February 28, 2:30 pm

Sheet G	1	2	3	4	5	6	7	8	Final
(Newfoundland and Labrador) Memorial Sea-Hawks (Perry)	1	1	0	2	0	2	0	0	6
(New Brunswick) UNB Reds (Stewart)	0	0	1	0	1	0	2	1	5

==== Final ====
Friday, February 28, 2:30 pm

Sheet E	1	2	3	4	5	6	7	8	Final
(Ontario) Carleton Ravens (Nicholls)	0	2	0	1	0	0	1	0	4
(Ontario) Wilfrid Laurier Golden Hawks (Mulima)	1	0	2	0	2	1	0	1	7

=== Final standings ===
Place	Team
1st place, gold medalist(s)	(Ontario) Wilfrid Laurier Golden Hawks
2nd place, silver medalist(s)	(Ontario) Carleton Ravens
3rd place, bronze medalist(s)	(Newfoundland and Labrador) Memorial Sea-Hawks
4	(New Brunswick) UNB Reds
5	(Alberta) Calgary Dinos
6	(Ontario) Brock Badgers
7	(Saskatchewan) Regina Cougars
8	(Alberta) Lethbridge Pronghorns

== Women ==
=== Qualification ===
The following universities qualified to participate in the 2025 U Sports/Curling Canada University Curling Championships:

Region	Vacancies	Qualified
Host	1	(Alberta) Lethbridge Pronghorns
Canada West Universities Athletic Association	2	(Saskatchewan) Regina Cougars (British Columbia) Thompson Rivers WolfPack
Ontario University Athletics	3	(Ontario) McMaster Marauders (Ontario) Wilfrid Laurier Golden Hawks (Ontario) Guelph Gryphons
Atlantic University Sport	2	(Nova Scotia) Dalhousie Tigers (Nova Scotia) St. Francis Xavier X-Women
TOTAL	8	

=== Teams ===
The teams are listed as follows:

Team	Skip	Third	Second	Lead	Alternate	University
Dalhousie Tigers	Allyson MacNutt	Rebecca Regan	Grace McCusker	Cate Fitzgerald	Cally Moore	(Nova Scotia) Dalhousie University
Guelph Gryphons	Jillian Uniacke	Abbey Parkinson	Liana Flanagan	Monica Tanguay	Sarah Wood	(Ontario) University of Guelph
Lethbridge Pronghorns	Cameron Kuzma	Elspeth Cooper	Sheyenne Funk	Jayla Robertson	Ainsley Gillis	(Alberta) University of Lethbridge
McMaster Marauders	Rachel Steele (Fourth)	Evelyn Robert	Maggie Fitzgerald (Skip)	Clara Dissanayake	Sydney Taylor	(Ontario) McMaster University
Regina Cougars	Chloe Johnston	Chantel Hoag	Tesa Silversides	Hannah Rugg	Lauren Speidel	(Saskatchewan) University of Regina
St. Francis Xavier X-Women	Abbygail Rafuse	Deidra Fraser	Natalie MacKinnon	Ace MacDonald	Hanna Manthorne	(Nova Scotia) St. Francis Xavier University
Thompson Rivers WolfPack	Holly Hafeli	Jorja Kopytko	Hannah O'Neil	Natalie Hafeli		(British Columbia) Thompson Rivers University
Wilfrid Laurier Golden Hawks	Emma Artichuk	Sarah Bailey	Scotia Maltman	Tori Zemmelink	Logan Shaw	(Ontario) Wilfrid Laurier University

=== Round robin standings ===
Final Round Robin Standings

Key
Teams to Playoffs

Team	Skip	W	L	W–L	PF	PA	EW	EL	BE	SE	LSD
(Ontario) Wilfrid Laurier Golden Hawks	Emma Artichuk	7	0	–	51	15	28	10	10	14	339.6
(British Columbia) Thompson Rivers WolfPack	Holly Hafeli	5	2	–	45	31	25	20	1	12	505.8
(Ontario) McMaster Marauders	Maggie Fitzgerald	4	3	1–0	40	36	19	23	1	7	637.7
(Nova Scotia) Dalhousie Tigers	Allyson MacNutt	4	3	0–1	45	37	25	27	2	8	683.5
(Ontario) Guelph Gryphons	Jillian Uniacke	3	4	1–0	33	42	22	23	3	8	610.5
(Saskatchewan) Regina Cougars	Chloe Johnston	3	4	0–1	33	33	22	22	3	7	463.5
(Alberta) Lethbridge Pronghorns	Cameron Kuzma	1	6	1–0	21	55	16	28	1	3	734.7
(Nova Scotia) St. Francis Xavier X-Women	Abbygail Rafuse	1	6	0–1	28	47	19	23	6	4	684.9

Round Robin Summary Table
Pos.	Team	(Nova Scotia) DAL	(Ontario) GUE	(Alberta) LET	(Ontario) MAC	(Saskatchewan) REG	(Nova Scotia) SFX	(British Columbia) TRU	(Ontario) WLU	Record
4	(Nova Scotia) Dalhousie Tigers	—	8–4	9–2	5–7	6–7	5–4	8–6	4–7	4–3
5	(Ontario) Guelph Gryphons	4–8	—	7–2	2–8	6–4	9–5	3–6	2–9	3–4
7	(Alberta) Lethbridge Pronghorns	2–9	2–7	—	4–9	2–8	6–5	4–10	1–7	1–6
3	(Ontario) McMaster Marauders	7–5	8–2	9–4	—	4–6	9–2	3–10	0–7	4–3
6	(Saskatchewan) Regina Cougars	7–6	4–6	8–2	6–4	—	2–6	4–5	2–4	3–4
8	(Nova Scotia) St. Francis Xavier X-Women	4–5	5–9	5–6	2–9	6–2	—	2–6	4–10	1–6
2	(British Columbia) Thompson Rivers WolfPack	6–8	6–3	10–4	10–3	5–4	6–2	—	2–7	5–2
1	(Ontario) Wilfrid Laurier Golden Hawks	7–4	9–2	7–1	7–0	4–2	10–4	7–2	—	7–0

=== Round robin results ===
All draws are listed in Mountain Time (UTC−07:00).

==== Draw 1 ====
Monday, February 24, 3:30 pm

Sheet B	1	2	3	4	5	6	7	8	9	Final
(Nova Scotia) St. Francis Xavier X-Women (Rafuse)	0	0	1	0	0	1	0	2	0	4
(Nova Scotia) Dalhousie Tigers (MacNutt)	0	1	0	0	2	0	1	0	1	5

Sheet D	1	2	3	4	5	6	7	8	Final
(Ontario) McMaster Marauders (Fitzgerald)	0	1	0	0	2	1	4	X	8
(Ontario) Guelph Gryphons (Uniacke)	0	0	0	2	0	0	0	X	2

Sheet G	1	2	3	4	5	6	7	8	Final
(Saskatchewan) Regina Cougars (Johnston)	3	1	0	0	3	0	1	X	8
(Alberta) Lethbridge Pronghorns (Kuzma)	0	0	1	0	0	1	0	X	2

Sheet H	1	2	3	4	5	6	7	8	Final
(Ontario) Wilfrid Laurier Golden Hawks (Artichuk)	0	1	3	0	0	2	1	X	7
(British Columbia) Thompson Rivers WolfPack (Hafeli)	0	0	0	2	0	0	0	X	2

==== Draw 3 ====
Tuesday, February 25, 8:30 am

Sheet B	1	2	3	4	5	6	7	8	Final
(Ontario) Guelph Gryphons (Uniacke)	0	0	0	2	0	0	0	0	2
(Ontario) Wilfrid Laurier Golden Hawks (Artichuk)	0	0	1	0	1	1	1	5	9

Sheet C	1	2	3	4	5	6	7	8	Final
(Alberta) Lethbridge Pronghorns (Kuzma)	1	0	3	0	0	0	1	1	6
(Nova Scotia) St. Francis Xavier X-Women (Rafuse)	0	1	0	0	3	1	0	0	5

Sheet E	1	2	3	4	5	6	7	8	Final
(Nova Scotia) Dalhousie Tigers (MacNutt)	1	0	1	2	0	0	2	0	6
(Saskatchewan) Regina Cougars (Johnston)	0	3	0	0	1	1	0	2	7

Sheet G	1	2	3	4	5	6	7	8	Final
(British Columbia) Thompson Rivers WolfPack (Hafeli)	3	0	4	1	1	1	X	X	10
(Ontario) McMaster Marauders (Fitzgerald)	0	3	0	0	0	0	X	X	3

==== Draw 5 ====
Tuesday, February 25, 4:30 pm

Sheet A	1	2	3	4	5	6	7	8	Final
(British Columbia) Thompson Rivers WolfPack (Hafeli)	4	0	2	1	1	0	2	X	10
(Alberta) Lethbridge Pronghorns (Kuzma)	0	1	0	0	0	3	0	X	4

Sheet C	1	2	3	4	5	6	7	8	Final
(Ontario) Wilfrid Laurier Golden Hawks (Artichuk)	0	0	2	0	0	0	0	2	4
(Saskatchewan) Regina Cougars (Johnston)	0	1	0	1	0	0	0	0	2

Sheet F	1	2	3	4	5	6	7	8	Final
(Ontario) Guelph Gryphons (Uniacke)	1	0	1	0	1	1	0	X	4
(Nova Scotia) Dalhousie Tigers (MacNutt)	0	4	0	1	0	0	3	X	8

Sheet H	1	2	3	4	5	6	7	8	Final
(Ontario) McMaster Marauders (Fitzgerald)	0	4	0	3	2	0	X	X	9
(Nova Scotia) St. Francis Xavier X-Women (Rafuse)	0	0	1	0	0	1	X	X	2

==== Draw 7 ====
Wednesday, February 26, 8:30 am

Sheet A	1	2	3	4	5	6	7	8	Final
(Nova Scotia) St. Francis Xavier X-Women (Rafuse)	0	0	1	0	2	1	0	X	4
(Ontario) Wilfrid Laurier Golden Hawks (Artichuk)	3	0	0	3	0	0	4	X	10

Sheet D	1	2	3	4	5	6	7	8	Final
(Nova Scotia) Dalhousie Tigers (MacNutt)	2	0	0	0	3	0	1	2	8
(British Columbia) Thompson Rivers WolfPack (Hafeli)	0	0	2	1	0	3	0	0	6

Sheet E	1	2	3	4	5	6	7	8	Final
(Alberta) Lethbridge Pronghorns (Kuzma)	1	0	0	0	1	0	0	X	2
(Ontario) Guelph Gryphons (Uniacke)	0	1	2	1	0	1	2	X	7

Sheet F	1	2	3	4	5	6	7	8	Final
(Saskatchewan) Regina Cougars (Johnston)	0	2	0	2	1	1	0	X	6
(Ontario) McMaster Marauders (Fitzgerald)	1	0	1	0	0	0	2	X	4

==== Draw 9 ====
Wednesday, February 26, 4:30 pm

Sheet C	1	2	3	4	5	6	7	8	Final
(Ontario) Guelph Gryphons (Uniacke)	0	0	1	1	0	1	0	X	3
(British Columbia) Thompson Rivers WolfPack (Hafeli)	2	2	0	0	1	0	1	X	6

Sheet D	1	2	3	4	5	6	7	8	Final
(Saskatchewan) Regina Cougars (Johnston)	1	0	0	0	0	1	0	X	2
(Nova Scotia) St. Francis Xavier X-Women (Rafuse)	0	0	3	0	1	0	2	X	6

Sheet E	1	2	3	4	5	6	7	8	Final
(Ontario) Wilfrid Laurier Golden Hawks (Artichuk)	0	3	1	1	1	1	X	X	7
(Ontario) McMaster Marauders (Fitzgerald)	0	0	0	0	0	0	X	X	0

Sheet H	1	2	3	4	5	6	7	8	Final
(Nova Scotia) Dalhousie Tigers (MacNutt)	2	0	1	1	0	2	3	X	9
(Alberta) Lethbridge Pronghorns (Kuzma)	0	1	0	0	1	0	0	X	2

==== Draw 12 ====
Thursday, February 27, 12:30 pm

Sheet A	1	2	3	4	5	6	7	8	Final
(Ontario) Guelph Gryphons (Uniacke)	0	3	0	0	0	1	1	1	6
(Saskatchewan) Regina Cougars (Johnston)	1	0	0	3	0	0	0	0	4

Sheet B	1	2	3	4	5	6	7	8	Final
(Ontario) McMaster Marauders (Fitzgerald)	0	0	3	0	4	2	X	X	9
(Alberta) Lethbridge Pronghorns (Kuzma)	1	1	0	2	0	0	X	X	4

Sheet F	1	2	3	4	5	6	7	8	Final
(British Columbia) Thompson Rivers WolfPack (Hafeli)	0	0	3	1	0	2	0	X	6
(Nova Scotia) St. Francis Xavier X-Women (Rafuse)	0	0	0	0	1	0	1	X	2

Sheet G	1	2	3	4	5	6	7	8	Final
(Ontario) Wilfrid Laurier Golden Hawks (Artichuk)	1	0	0	1	1	1	2	1	7
(Nova Scotia) Dalhousie Tigers (MacNutt)	0	3	1	0	0	0	0	0	4

==== Draw 14 ====
Thursday, February 27, 8:30 pm

Sheet A	1	2	3	4	5	6	7	8	9	Final
(Ontario) McMaster Marauders (Fitzgerald)	0	0	2	1	1	0	1	0	2	7
(Nova Scotia) Dalhousie Tigers (MacNutt)	0	2	0	0	0	1	0	2	0	5

Sheet B	1	2	3	4	5	6	7	8	Final
(British Columbia) Thompson Rivers WolfPack (Hafeli)	0	1	1	1	0	2	0	0	5
(Saskatchewan) Regina Cougars (Johnston)	1	0	0	0	1	0	1	1	4

Sheet F	1	2	3	4	5	6	7	8	Final
(Alberta) Lethbridge Pronghorns (Kuzma)	0	0	1	0	0	0	X	X	1
(Ontario) Wilfrid Laurier Golden Hawks (Artichuk)	0	3	0	1	3	0	X	X	7

Sheet G	1	2	3	4	5	6	7	8	Final
(Nova Scotia) St. Francis Xavier X-Women (Rafuse)	0	0	2	1	0	2	0	X	5
(Ontario) Guelph Gryphons (Uniacke)	2	2	0	0	1	0	4	X	9

=== Playoffs ===
Semifinal
1	(Ontario) Wilfrid Laurier Golden Hawks	9
4	(Nova Scotia) Dalhousie Tigers	4
2	(British Columbia) Thompson Rivers WolfPack	4
3	(Ontario) McMaster Marauders	5

Final
1	(Ontario) Wilfrid Laurier Golden Hawks	5
3	(Ontario) McMaster Marauders	4
Bronze medal game
4	(Nova Scotia) Dalhousie Tigers	6
2	(British Columbia) Thompson Rivers WolfPack	5

==== Semifinals ====
Friday, February 28, 9:30 am

Sheet E	1	2	3	4	5	6	7	8	Final
(Ontario) Wilfrid Laurier Golden Hawks (Artichuk)	2	1	0	2	0	0	0	4	9
(Nova Scotia) Dalhousie Tigers (MacNutt)	0	0	3	0	0	1	0	0	4

Sheet H	1	2	3	4	5	6	7	8	Final
(British Columbia) Thompson Rivers WolfPack (Hafeli)	1	0	1	0	0	1	0	1	4
(Ontario) McMaster Marauders (Fitzgerald)	0	2	0	0	2	0	1	0	5

==== Bronze medal game ====
Friday, February 28, 2:30 pm

Sheet B	1	2	3	4	5	6	7	8	Final
(Nova Scotia) Dalhousie Tigers (MacNutt)	0	1	0	0	2	1	2	0	6
(British Columbia) Thompson Rivers WolfPack (Hafeli)	1	0	0	3	0	0	0	1	5

==== Final ====
Friday, February 28, 2:30 pm

Sheet D	1	2	3	4	5	6	7	8	Final
(Ontario) Wilfrid Laurier Golden Hawks (Artichuk)	0	2	0	1	1	0	0	1	5
(Ontario) McMaster Marauders (Fitzgerald)	0	0	2	0	0	2	0	0	4

=== Final standings ===
Place	Team
1st place, gold medalist(s)	(Ontario) Wilfrid Laurier Golden Hawks
2nd place, silver medalist(s)	(Ontario) McMaster Marauders
3rd place, bronze medalist(s)	(Nova Scotia) Dalhousie Tigers
4	(British Columbia) Thompson Rivers WolfPack
5	(Ontario) Guelph Gryphons
6	(Saskatchewan) Regina Cougars
7	(Alberta) Lethbridge Pronghorns
8	(Nova Scotia) St. Francis Xavier X-Women
