= Lindsey Burgess =

Canadian curler

- Curler
- Born: July 21, 1999 (age 27); Williams Lake, British Columbia

Team
- Curling club: Halifax CC, Halifax, NS
- Skip: Christina Black
- Third: Jill Brothers
- Second: Marlee Powers
- Lead: Lindsey Burgess
- Alternate: Karlee Everist

Curling career
- Member Association: Nova Scotia (2014–2024; 2026–present); Alberta (2024–2026)
- Top CTRS ranking: 5th (2025–26)
Medal record
Women's curling
Representing Canada
World Junior Curling Championships
Gold medal – first place	2018 Aberdeen

Lindsey Burgess (born July 21, 1999 in Williams Lake, British Columbia) is a Canadian curler from Edmonton, Alberta. She currently plays lead on Team Christina Black. As a junior, Burgess won a gold medal at the 2018 World Junior Curling Championships with skip Kaitlyn Jones. She was the 2020 Female Athlete of the Year for Nova Scotia curling.

== Career ==
=== Juniors ===
Burgess played on a couple teams from 2014 to 2017 before joining the Kaitlyn Jones rink for the 2017–18 season. They won the New Scotland Clothing Ladies Cashspiel and had a quarterfinal finish at the Spitfire Arms Cash Spiel on the World Curling Tour. They would also win the Nova Scotia junior championship and represent Nova Scotia at the 2018 Canadian Junior Curling Championships, Burgess' first national appearance. At nationals they did not stumble, finishing the round robin and championship pool with a 9–1 record, sending them to the final. They defeated Quebec 5–3 to claim Nova Scotia's fifth title in the women's competition. They would continue their impressive play at the 2018 World Junior Curling Championships in Aberdeen, Scotland posting a 7–2 round robin record. They successfully knocked off China and Sweden in the playoff round to win the gold medal. They finished their season at the 2018 Humpty's Champions Cup slam event where they went 0–4.

The following season, the team was invited to play in the 2018 Masters Grand Slam of Curling event as the sponsors exemption. Despite this, they finished the round robin with a 3–1 record, beating Rachel Homan, Kerri Einarson and Silvana Tirinzoni with their only loss coming to Tracy Fleury. They couldn't continue their momentum into the playoffs however, falling to Chelsea Carey in the quarterfinals. Team Jones would win the Nova Scotia junior championship once again this season, sending them to the national championship for a second time. They qualified for the playoffs once again but had to go through the semifinal to advance to the final. Unfortunately, they lost to British Columbia's Sarah Daniels and would not advance.

Team Jones disbanded after the season as Kaitlyn Jones was aging out of juniors. Karlee Burgess and Lauren Lenentine moved to Manitoba and Burgess joined a new team with Taylour Stevens skipping. They easily won the provincial junior title this year, going undefeated through the event. At nationals, Team Stevens finished 8–2 throughout pool play, clinching them a playoff berth. Things wouldn't go their way in the semifinal however, losing to Alberta's Abby Marks in an extra end. Later that year, Burgess competed for Dalhousie at the 2020 U Sports/Curling Canada University Curling Championships where they finished fifth. Burgess aged out of juniors the following season and reunited with her former skip Kaitlyn Jones. They brought on Jessica Daigle, Brigitte MacPhail and Kaitlin Fralic to their team.

=== Women's ===
After a few seasons in Nova Scotia, during the 2024–25 season, Burgess would leave the province and join Alberta's Team Serena Gray-Withers as second, alongside Catherine Clifford and Zoe Cinnamon. This new team began the year with a third place finish at the U25 NextGen Classic after falling to Taylor Reese-Hansen in the semifinal. Following this, the team missed the playoffs at seven straight tour events, including the 2024 Tour Challenge Tier 2, and lost in the first round of the 2024 PointsBet Invitational. They turned things around in December, however, by winning the second Alberta Curling Series event. They also won their final event of the season, the Best of the West U30 event.

The 2025–26 season was a breakthrough season for the Gray-Withers rink as they climbed to number five on the CTRS standings. In August, the team won the NextGen Classic title, defeating Mélodie Forsythe in the final. They then reached the semifinals of the 2025 Saville Shootout where they lost to Gim Eun-ji. The team then won back-to-back events at the Saville U25 Challenge and McKee Homes Fall Curling Classic before claiming the inaugural U25 Tour Challenge Grand Slam title. In November, the team lost in the final of the DeKalb Superspiel to Miyu Ueno and reached the semifinals of the Crestwood Anniversary Showdown. They also made it to the quarterfinals of the 2025 Canadian Open Tier 2 where they were defeated by Taylor Reese-Hansen. With all their playoff appearances throughout the fall, the team entered the 2026 Alberta Women's Curling Championship as the number one seeds and qualified for the playoffs through the A side, defeating second seed Selena Sturmay. They then beat Sturmay again in the 1 vs. 2 game to qualify for the final where they'd meet Sturmay for a third time. After giving up a steal of two in the third end, the team trailed throughout the rest of the game, ultimately losing 9–5 and finishing second. Team Gray-Withers ended their season at the Karuizawa International where they finished fourth. After two seasons together, Team Gray-Withers would announce that they were "making a change at the second position", and Burgess would be leaving the team. On April 17, 2026, it was announced that Burgess would be returning to Nova Scotia to take over the lead position on Christina Black's team for the 2026-27 season in place of Karlee Everist, who is expecting her second child in October and will be assuming alternate duties for the season.

== Personal life ==
Burgess attended Dalhousie University. Her cousin, Karlee Burgess, played on her gold medal-winning team in 2018. She is employed as a geologist.

== Teams ==
Season	Skip	Third	Second	Lead	Alternate
2014–15	Mandi Newhook	Cassie Cocks	Lindsey Burgess	Hannah Brush	
2015–16	Mandi Newhook	Cassie Cocks	Lindsey Burgess	Hannah Brush	
2016–17	Kirsten Lind (Fourth)	Lindsey Burgess	Julie Carson	Carina McKay-Saturnino (Skip)	
2017–18	Kaitlyn Jones	Kristin Clarke	Karlee Burgess	Lindsey Burgess	
2018–19	Kaitlyn Jones	Lauren Lenentine	Karlee Burgess	Lindsey Burgess	
2019–20	Taylour Stevens	Lindsey Burgess	Kate Callaghan	Cate Fitzgerald	
2020–21	Kaitlyn Jones	Jessica Daigle	Brigitte MacPhail	Lindsey Burgess	Kaitlin Fralic
2021–22	Jessica Daigle	Kristin Clarke	Lindsey Burgess	Emma Logan	
2022–23	Jessica Daigle	Kirsten Lind	Lindsey Burgess	Emma Logan	
2023–24	Jessica Daigle	Mary Myketyn-Driscoll	Marlee Powers	Lindsey Burgess	
2023–24	Jessica Daigle	Marlee Powers	Lindsey Burgess	Katie Vandenborre	
2024–25	Serena Gray-Withers	Catherine Clifford	Lindsey Burgess	Zoe Cinnamon	
2025–26	Serena Gray-Withers	Catherine Clifford	Lindsey Burgess	Zoe Cinnamon	
2026–27	Christina Black	Jill Brothers	Marlee Powers	Lindsey Burgess	Karlee Everist
