= St. Francis Xavier X-Men and X-Women =

Athletic teams of St. Francis Xavier University

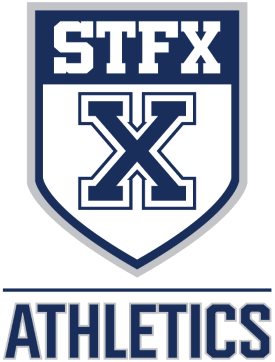
- University: St. Francis Xavier University
- Association: U Sports
- Conference: Atlantic University Sport
- Athletic director: Leo MacPherson
- Location: Antigonish, Nova Scotia
- Varsity teams: 12 (6 men's, 6 women's)
- Football stadium: StFX Stadium
- Basketball arena: Amelia Saputo Centre
- Ice hockey arena: Charles V. Keating Centre
- Soccer stadium: StFX Stadium
- Outdoor track and field venue: StFX Stadium
- Colours: Blue, White, and Silver
- Website: www.goxgo.ca
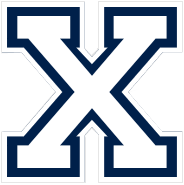

The St. Francis Xavier X-Men and X-Women are the men's and women's athletic teams that represent St. Francis Xavier University in Antigonish, Nova Scotia, Canada. Their primary home turf is the Amelia Saputo Centre for Healthy Living, located on the University's campus.

== History ==
In 1966, the X-Men Football team won the College Bowl (now the Vanier Cup) as top university football team in Canada. The X-Men Basketball program has won 3 CIS Championships (1993, 2000, and 2001) and in 2004, the X-Men Hockey team won their first CIS Championship. In 2011, the X-Women Hockey team placed 2nd at the CIS Championships in Ottawa and in 2016, the X-Men hockey team were runners-up in the CIS Championships in Halifax.

In 2006, the X-Women Rugby team became the first female StFX varsity team to win a CIS Championship, as 10-time defending AUS Rugby Champions. In 2008, the team placed 2nd at the CIS Championships in Lethbridge, Alberta after capturing their 12th consecutive AUS Championship. The team has a total of five National Championships, having won a fifth title in 2016 in Victoria, BC. and 17 consecutive conference championships from 1997 until 2014.

Between 2006 and 2016 the X-Men Cross Country team won 9 AUS Championships, including 6 consecutively and 2 CIS medals. In 2017 it was announced that alumnus, CIS Champion, and Olympian Eric Gillis would become head coach.

== Varsity teams ==
The X-Men & X-Women compete in:

Men's sports	Women's sports
Basketball	Basketball
Cross country	Cross country
Ice hockey	Ice hockey
Football	Rugby
Soccer	Soccer
Track and field	Track and field

=== Football ===
The X-Men football program has been in operation since 1954. They were the first Atlantic conference team to win a Vanier Cup national championship in 1966 and have also finished as runner-ups in the 1996 game. The team has won 16 Jewett Trophy conference championships.

=== Men's ice hockey ===
St. Francis Xavier formed its first varsity ice hockey team in 1905. That season the X-Men competed with other local colleges for the inaugural Hewson Cup, donated by E.E. Hewson. Rules stipulated that the first team to win the trophy three times would be allowed to keep the cup. SFX proceeded to win the title in the first three years of contention and lay permanent claim to the trophy.

=== Women's ice hockey ===
The X-Women ice hockey team has participated in the Atlantic University Sport conference since the sport was established in the CIAU in 1997. The program has won 11 AUS conference championships with the most recent coming in 2020. Nationally, the program's best finish was in 2011 when they finished as national runners-up.

== Facilities ==
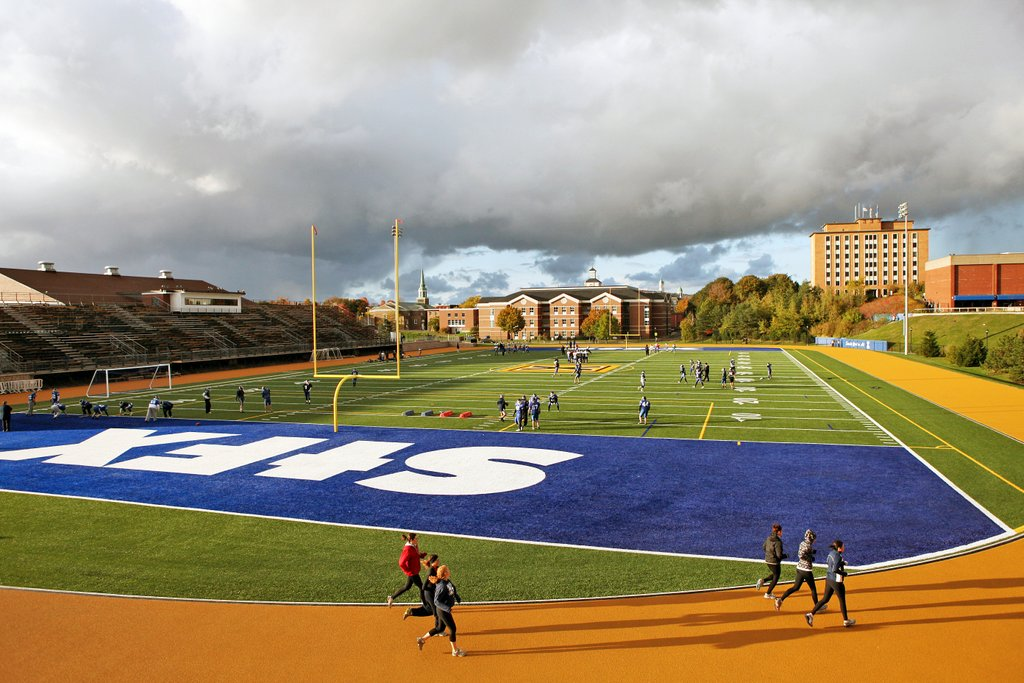
StFX Stadium with its pitch and running track

Venue	Sport(s)	Ref.
StFX Stadium	Football; Soccer; Rugby; Track and field	
Charles V. Keating Centre Arenas	Ice hockey	
Amelia Saputo Centre	Basketball	
