= Memorial Sea-Hawks =

Athletic teams of Memorial University

- University: Memorial University of Newfoundland
- U Sports: Atlantic University Sport
- Athletic director: Karen Murphy
- Location: St. John's, Newfoundland and Labrador
- Varsity teams: 24
- Basketball arena: Memorial Fieldhouse
- Soccer stadium: King George V Park
- Mascot: Sammy
- Nickname: Sea-Hawks
- Colours: Claret and White
- Website: www.goseahawks.ca
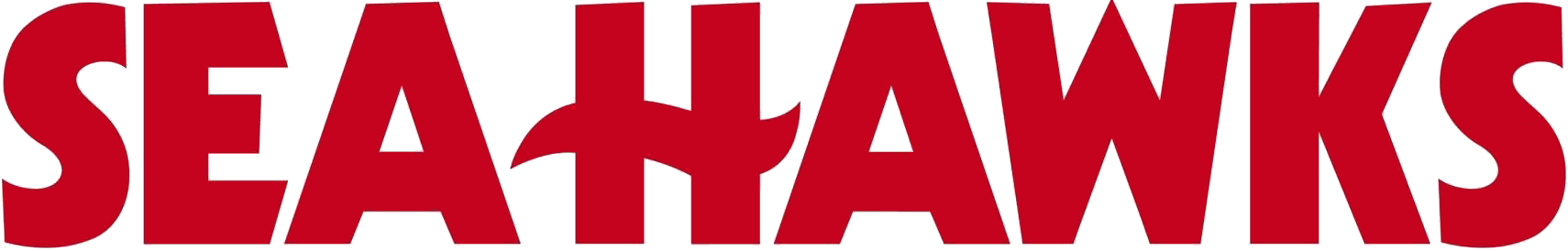

The Memorial Sea-Hawks are the athletic teams that represent Memorial University of Newfoundland in St. John's, Newfoundland and Labrador, Canada. There are varsity teams in men's and women's basketball, cross-country, soccer, swimming, and volleyball which compete in U Sports. Curling, track and field and wrestling are also available as club sports.

The university's teams were originally named the Beothuks, after the original inhabitants of Newfoundland, but was changed in 1990 when that name was deemed inappropriate.

== Varsity teams ==
Men's sports	Women's sports
Basketball	Basketball
Cross country	Cross country
Soccer	Soccer
Swimming	Swimming
Volleyball	Volleyball

== Former teams ==
- Ice hockey (men's)
