= 2026 Canadian Mixed Doubles Curling Championship =

Curling tournament

- Host city: Surrey, British Columbia
- Arena: Cloverdale Curling Club
- Dates: March 21–27
- Winner: (Alberta) (Ontario) Gray-Withers / Pietrangelo
- Curling club: Saville Community SC, Edmonton & Niagara Falls CC, Niagara Falls
- Female: Serena Gray-Withers
- Male: Victor Pietrangelo
- Finalist: (Alberta) Cinnamon / Tao

The 2026 Canadian Mixed Doubles Curling Championship was being held from March 21 to 27 at the Cloverdale Curling Club in Surrey, British Columbia, which marks the first time the Canadian Mixed Doubles national championship will be hosted by British Columbia. The winning pair of Serena Gray-Withers and Victor Pietrangelo will represent Canada at the 2027 World Mixed Doubles Curling Championship.

The format of the championship featured twenty-eight teams split into four pools, each playing a six-game round-robin with 12 teams advancing to the single knockout playoffs. The four pool winners will earn byes directly into the quarterfinals, while the teams with the following eight best records, regardless of the pool, compete in the qualification playoff games.

== Qualification process ==
Teams qualified for the championship are as follows:

Means of Qualification	Vacancies	Qualified
2025 CMDCC semifinalists	~~4~~ 2 (Note: Reigning Champions Lott / Lott declined their berth as Colton Lott will be representing Canada at the 2026 World Men's Curling Championship. Team Brunton / Horgan, who were also semifinalists representing Northern Ontario in the 2025 Championship, qualified as Team Ontario provincial champions for the 2026 Championship. These two extra spots were allotted to teams based on CMDR rankings.)	(Nova Scotia) Powers / Saunders (New Brunswick) Adams / Robichaud
2026 MD Provincial/Territorial Champions	14	(Alberta) Cinnamon / Tao (British Columbia) Loken / Tanaka (Manitoba) Arbuckle / Macdonell (New Brunswick) Watson / Beland (Newfoundland and Labrador) Wiseman / Smith (Northern Ontario) Wright / Sinclair (Northwest Territories) Wainman / Saturnino (Nova Scotia) Christianson / Mosher (Nunavut) Hulme / Van Strien (Ontario) Brunton / Horgan (Prince Edward Island) Lenentine / MacFayden (Quebec) Sanscartier / Caron (Saskatchewan) Martin / Kleiter (Yukon) Goncalves / Williams
2025/26 CMDR Top 10 non-qualified teams	~~10~~ 12	(Alberta) Peterman / Gallant (Ontario) Ford / Campbell (Ontario) Neil / McDonald (Ontario) Craig / Craig (Alberta) Homan / Bottcher (Quebec) Gionest / Desjardins (Ontario) Weeks / Steep (British Columbia) Woo / Wenzek (Ontario) Jones / Laing (Alberta) (Ontario) Gray-Withers / Pietrangelo (Quebec) Tremblay / Lanoue (Ontario) Nathan / Nathan
TOTAL	28	

== Teams ==
The teams are listed as follows:

Female	Male	Province(s) / Territory	Club(s)
Melissa Adams	Alex Robichaud	New Brunswick	Capital WC, Fredericton
Mackenzie Arbuckle	Aaron Macdonell	Manitoba	St. Vital CC, Winnipeg
Kira Brunton	Jacob Horgan	Ontario	Ottawa H&GC, Ottawa
Marie Christianson	Nick Mosher	Nova Scotia	Halifax CC, Halifax
Zoe Cinnamon	Johnson Tao	Alberta	Saville Community SC, Edmonton
Riley Craig	Brendan Craig	Ontario	St. Catharines G&CC, St. Catharines
Katie Ford	Oliver Campbell	Ontario	KW Granite Club, Waterloo
Anne-Sophie Gionest	Robert Desjardins	Quebec	CC Riverbend, Alma & CC Chicoutimi, Chicoutimi
Aline Goncalves	Tyler Williams	Yukon	Whitehorse CC, Whitehorse
Serena Gray-Withers	Victor Pietrangelo	Alberta / Ontario	Saville Community SC, Edmonton & Niagara Falls CC, Niagara Falls
Rachel Homan	Brendan Bottcher	Alberta	Sherwood Park CC, Sherwood Park & Saville Community SC, Edmonton
Connie Hulme	Peter Van Strien	Nunavut	Iqaluit CC, Iqaluit
Jennifer Jones	Brent Laing	Ontario	Barrie CC, Barrie
Ella Lenentine	Jack MacFadyen	Prince Edward Island	Cornwall CC, Cornwall
Sarah Loken	Cody Tanaka	British Columbia	Victoria CC, Victoria & Tsawwassen CC, Delta
Nancy Martin	Rylan Kleiter	Saskatchewan	Martensville CC, Martensville
McKenna Nathan	Tanner Nathan	Ontario	Sarnia G&CC, Point Edward
Laura Neil	Scott McDonald	Ontario	St. Thomas CC, St. Thomas
Jocelyn Peterman	Brett Gallant	Alberta	The Glencoe Club, Calgary
Marlee Powers	Luke Saunders	Nova Scotia	Halifax CC, Halifax
Sophie Sanscartier	Maxandre Caron	Quebec	CC Boucherville, Boucherville
Kelly Tremblay	Pierre Lanoue	Quebec	CC Boucherville, Boucherville & CC Nairn, Clermont
Reese Wainman	Nick Saturnino	Northwest Territories	Inuvik CC, Inuvik
Rebecca Watson	Sean Beland	New Brunswick	Capital WC, Fredericton
Terri Weeks	Samuel Steep	Ontario	KW Granite Club, Waterloo
Jessica Wiseman	Greg Smith	Newfoundland and Labrador	St. John's CC, St. John's
Courtney Woo	Daniel Wenzek	British Columbia	Langley CC, Langley & Cloverdale CC, Surrey
Lily Wright	Brayden Sinclair	Northern Ontario	Kakabeka Falls CC, Kakabeka Falls

== Round robin standings ==
Final Round Robin Standings

Key
Teams to Playoffs

Pool A	W	L	LSD
(Alberta) Cinnamon / Tao	5	1	36.90
(Alberta) Homan / Bottcher	5	1	35.25
(Ontario) Craig / Craig	3	3	23.53
(Alberta) Peterman / Gallant	3	3	27.30
(Northern Ontario) Wright / Sinclair	3	3	39.89
(Quebec) Tremblay / Lanoue	2	4	21.99
(Prince Edward Island) Lenentine / MacFayden	0	6	58.09

Pool B	W	L	LSD
(Quebec) Sanscartier / Caron	5	1	42.39
(Ontario) Neil / McDonald	4	2	24.20
(Ontario) Weeks / Steep	4	2	39.91
(Ontario) Jones / Laing	3	3	21.39
(New Brunswick) Watson / Beland	3	3	25.96
(British Columbia) Loken / Tanaka	2	4	25.16
(Yukon) Goncalves / Williams	0	6	78.99

Pool C	W	L	LSD
(Ontario) Ford / Campbell	6	0	42.87
(Alberta) (Ontario) Gray-Withers / Pietrangelo	4	2	30.82
(Saskatchewan) Martin / Kleiter	4	2	37.03
(Quebec) Gionest / Desjardins	3	3	25.62
(Northwest Territories) Wainman / Saturnino	2	4	73.83
(Ontario) Nathan / Nathan	2	4	78.59
(Nova Scotia) Christianson / Mosher	0	6	141.55

Pool D	W	L	LSD
(Ontario) Brunton / Horgan	6	0	29.50
(New Brunswick) Adams / Robichaud	5	1	37.08
(Nova Scotia) Powers / Saunders	3	3	24.04
(Manitoba) Arbuckle / Macdonell	3	3	32.58
(Newfoundland and Labrador) Wiseman / Smith	3	3	45.60
(British Columbia) Woo / Wenzek	1	5	30.42
(Nunavut) Hulme / Van Strien	0	6	101.56

== Round robin results ==
All draws are listed in Pacific Time (UTC−07:00).

=== Draw 1 ===
Saturday, March 21, 6:00 pm

Sheet A	1	2	3	4	5	6	7	8	Final
(Nova Scotia) Christianson / Mosher	0	0	1	0	0	0	0	X	1
(Ontario) Ford / Campbell 🔨	2	1	0	1	3	2	1	X	10

Sheet B	1	2	3	4	5	6	7	8	Final
(Ontario) Craig / Craig	0	3	2	0	1	0	0	3	9
(Quebec) Tremblay / Lanoue 🔨	1	0	0	4	0	1	1	0	7

Sheet C	1	2	3	4	5	6	7	8	Final
(Quebec) Sanscartier / Caron	0	0	0	1	1	3	3	0	8
(Ontario) Jones / Laing 🔨	5	1	2	0	0	0	0	1	9

Sheet D	1	2	3	4	5	6	7	8	Final
(New Brunswick) Adams / Robichaud 🔨	4	2	0	0	0	5	X	X	11
(Newfoundland and Labrador) Wiseman / Smith	0	0	3	1	1	0	X	X	5

Sheet E	1	2	3	4	5	6	7	8	Final
(Ontario) Nathan / Nathan	1	1	0	3	0	2	0	X	7
(Quebec) Gionest / Desjardins 🔨	0	0	4	0	6	0	2	X	12

=== Draw 2 ===
Saturday, March 21, 9:00 pm

Sheet A	1	2	3	4	5	6	7	8	Final
(Alberta) (Ontario) Gray-Withers / Pietrangelo 🔨	4	1	2	3	3	0	X	X	13
(Northwest Territories) Wainman / Saturnino	0	0	0	0	0	1	X	X	1

Sheet B	1	2	3	4	5	6	7	8	Final
(Ontario) Neil / McDonald 🔨	5	4	1	0	0	2	X	X	12
(Yukon) Goncalves / Williams	0	0	0	1	2	0	X	X	3

Sheet C	1	2	3	4	5	6	7	8	Final
(Alberta) Cinnamon / Tao 🔨	3	1	1	0	3	0	0	X	8
(Alberta) Peterman / Gallant	0	0	0	2	0	2	1	X	5

Sheet D	1	2	3	4	5	6	7	8	Final
(Ontario) Brunton / Horgan 🔨	0	2	0	4	0	3	X	X	9
(British Columbia) Woo / Wenzek	1	0	1	0	1	0	X	X	3

Sheet E	1	2	3	4	5	6	7	8	Final
(Prince Edward Island) Lenentine / MacFayden	1	1	0	0	0	2	0	X	4
(Northern Ontario) Wright / Sinclair 🔨	0	0	1	1	3	0	2	X	7

=== Draw 3 ===
Sunday, March 22, 10:00 am

Sheet A	1	2	3	4	5	6	7	8	Final
(British Columbia) Loken / Tanaka 🔨	0	1	0	0	4	0	0	0	5
(New Brunswick) Watson / Beland	1	0	1	2	0	2	1	1	8

Sheet C	1	2	3	4	5	6	7	8	Final
(Alberta) Homan / Bottcher	3	1	1	0	2	0	5	X	12
(Ontario) Craig / Craig 🔨	0	0	0	3	0	1	0	X	4

Sheet D	1	2	3	4	5	6	7	8	Final
(Nunavut) Hulme / Van Strien	0	0	0	0	0	0	X	X	0
(Nova Scotia) Powers / Saunders 🔨	4	1	2	1	3	3	X	X	14

Sheet E	1	2	3	4	5	6	7	8	Final
(Ontario) Ford / Campbell	1	2	0	2	0	1	1	1	8
(Saskatchewan) Martin / Kleiter 🔨	0	0	1	0	4	0	0	0	5

=== Draw 4 ===
Sunday, March 22, 1:00 pm

Sheet A	1	2	3	4	5	6	7	8	Final
(Nova Scotia) Christianson / Mosher 🔨	1	1	0	0	1	1	0	X	4
(Quebec) Gionest / Desjardins	0	0	2	2	0	0	1	X	5

Sheet B	1	2	3	4	5	6	7	8	9	Final
(Ontario) Jones / Laing 🔨	0	1	0	1	0	2	0	2	0	6
(Ontario) Weeks / Steep	2	0	1	0	1	0	2	0	1	7

Sheet C	1	2	3	4	5	6	7	8	Final
(Yukon) Goncalves / Williams	0	0	0	0	0	0	X	X	0
(British Columbia) Loken / Tanaka 🔨	1	1	2	1	1	1	X	X	7

Sheet D	1	2	3	4	5	6	7	8	Final
(Newfoundland and Labrador) Wiseman / Smith	0	1	1	2	0	4	0	X	8
(Manitoba) Arbuckle / Macdonell 🔨	3	0	0	0	1	0	1	X	5

Sheet E	1	2	3	4	5	6	7	8	Final
(Quebec) Tremblay / Lanoue 🔨	2	0	2	1	0	2	2	X	9
(Alberta) Cinnamon / Tao	0	2	0	0	2	0	0	X	4

=== Draw 5 ===
Sunday, March 22, 4:00 pm

Sheet A	1	2	3	4	5	6	7	8	Final
(Prince Edward Island) Lenentine / MacFayden	0	0	1	0	1	0	1	X	3
(Alberta) Peterman / Gallant 🔨	2	1	0	1	0	3	0	X	7

Sheet B	1	2	3	4	5	6	7	8	Final
(Ontario) Nathan / Nathan 🔨	0	0	1	2	1	0	3	0	7
(Alberta) (Ontario) Gray-Withers / Pietrangelo	1	2	0	0	0	2	0	1	6

Sheet C	1	2	3	4	5	6	7	8	Final
(Nova Scotia) Powers / Saunders 🔨	2	0	2	1	0	1	2	X	8
(British Columbia) Woo / Wenzek	0	2	0	0	1	0	0	X	3

Sheet D	1	2	3	4	5	6	7	8	9	Final
(New Brunswick) Watson / Beland 🔨	0	1	0	0	0	4	0	1	0	6
(Quebec) Sanscartier / Caron	1	0	1	1	1	0	2	0	2	8

Sheet E	1	2	3	4	5	6	7	8	Final
(Nunavut) Hulme / Van Strien	0	0	1	0	0	1	X	X	2
(New Brunswick) Adams / Robichaud 🔨	3	4	0	3	4	0	X	X	14

=== Draw 6 ===
Sunday, March 22, 7:00 pm

Sheet A	1	2	3	4	5	6	7	8	Final
(Northern Ontario) Wright / Sinclair 🔨	0	1	0	0	0	2	0	0	3
(Alberta) Homan / Bottcher	1	0	1	2	1	0	1	1	7

Sheet B	1	2	3	4	5	6	7	8	Final
(Manitoba) Arbuckle / Macdonell 🔨	0	1	0	1	0	1	0	X	3
(Ontario) Brunton / Horgan	1	0	4	0	1	0	2	X	8

Sheet C	1	2	3	4	5	6	7	8	9	Final
(Ontario) Ford / Campbell 🔨	0	0	1	1	1	0	2	0	4	9
(Quebec) Gionest / Desjardins	1	1	0	0	0	2	0	1	0	5

Sheet D	1	2	3	4	5	6	7	8	Final
(Northwest Territories) Wainman / Saturnino	0	1	0	0	0	0	X	X	1
(Saskatchewan) Martin / Kleiter 🔨	5	0	2	2	1	2	X	X	12

Sheet E	1	2	3	4	5	6	7	8	Final
(Ontario) Weeks / Steep 🔨	0	0	1	1	0	1	0	0	3
(Ontario) Neil / McDonald	1	1	0	0	1	0	1	1	5

=== Draw 7 ===
Monday, March 23, 10:00 am

Sheet A	1	2	3	4	5	6	7	8	Final
(Alberta) Cinnamon / Tao	1	0	3	0	0	3	0	2	9
(Ontario) Craig / Craig 🔨	0	3	0	2	1	0	2	0	8

Sheet B	1	2	3	4	5	6	7	8	Final
(Newfoundland and Labrador) Wiseman / Smith 🔨	1	1	0	1	1	0	0	0	4
(Nova Scotia) Powers / Saunders	0	0	1	0	0	3	1	2	7

Sheet C	Final
(Nova Scotia) Christianson / Mosher	L
(Ontario) Nathan / Nathan 🔨	W

Sheet D	1	2	3	4	5	6	7	8	Final
(Quebec) Tremblay / Lanoue	0	0	0	1	0	0	0	X	1
(Alberta) Peterman / Gallant 🔨	1	2	1	0	1	2	0	X	7

Sheet E	1	2	3	4	5	6	7	8	Final
(Ontario) Jones / Laing	0	2	0	1	0	0	0	X	3
(British Columbia) Loken / Tanaka 🔨	1	0	1	0	1	2	2	X	7

=== Draw 8 ===
Monday, March 23, 1:00 pm

Sheet A	1	2	3	4	5	6	7	8	Final
(New Brunswick) Adams / Robichaud	1	0	0	5	0	2	0	1	9
(British Columbia) Woo / Wenzek 🔨	0	1	1	0	1	0	4	0	7

Sheet B	1	2	3	4	5	6	7	8	Final
(Alberta) Homan / Bottcher	0	1	0	4	1	3	X	X	9
(Prince Edward Island) Lenentine / MacFayden 🔨	1	0	2	0	0	0	X	X	3

Sheet C	1	2	3	4	5	6	7	8	9	Final
(Alberta) (Ontario) Gray-Withers / Pietrangelo	1	0	1	0	1	0	3	0	1	7
(Saskatchewan) Martin / Kleiter 🔨	0	3	0	1	0	1	0	1	0	6

Sheet D	1	2	3	4	5	6	7	8	9	Final
(Ontario) Neil / McDonald	1	3	0	2	0	1	0	3	0	10
(New Brunswick) Watson / Beland 🔨	0	0	2	0	5	0	3	0	1	11

Sheet E	1	2	3	4	5	6	7	8	Final
(Quebec) Sanscartier / Caron	1	2	0	3	0	2	X	X	8
(Yukon) Goncalves / Williams 🔨	0	0	2	0	1	0	X	X	3

=== Draw 9 ===
Monday, March 23, 4:00 pm

Sheet A	1	2	3	4	5	6	7	8	Final
(Manitoba) Arbuckle / Macdonell	0	3	1	1	0	0	4	X	9
(Nova Scotia) Powers / Saunders 🔨	2	0	0	0	2	1	0	X	5

Sheet B	1	2	3	4	5	6	7	8	9	Final
(Ontario) Weeks / Steep	0	1	0	1	1	0	2	1	3	9
(British Columbia) Loken / Tanaka 🔨	2	0	2	0	0	2	0	0	0	6

Sheet C	1	2	3	4	5	6	7	8	Final
(Nunavut) Hulme / Van Strien	0	0	2	0	0	0	X	X	2
(Ontario) Brunton / Horgan 🔨	2	3	0	6	3	3	X	X	17

Sheet D	1	2	3	4	5	6	7	8	Final
(Northern Ontario) Wright / Sinclair	0	1	0	3	1	0	0	3	8
(Ontario) Craig / Craig 🔨	2	0	2	0	0	1	1	0	6

Sheet E	1	2	3	4	5	6	7	8	Final
(Northwest Territories) Wainman / Saturnino	0	0	0	0	0	0	X	X	0
(Ontario) Ford / Campbell 🔨	2	2	3	3	1	3	X	X	14

=== Draw 10 ===
Monday, March 23, 7:00 pm

Sheet A	1	2	3	4	5	6	7	8	Final
(Quebec) Sanscartier / Caron	1	1	0	3	4	1	X	X	10
(Ontario) Neil / McDonald 🔨	0	0	2	0	0	0	X	X	2

Sheet B	1	2	3	4	5	6	7	8	Final
(Ontario) Brunton / Horgan 🔨	1	0	5	1	0	0	4	X	11
(New Brunswick) Adams / Robichaud	0	3	0	0	2	1	0	X	6

Sheet C	1	2	3	4	5	6	7	8	Final
(Prince Edward Island) Lenentine / MacFayden 🔨	1	0	2	0	0	1	0	0	4
(Alberta) Cinnamon / Tao	0	2	0	3	1	0	2	1	9

Sheet D	Final
(Saskatchewan) Martin / Kleiter 🔨	W
(Nova Scotia) Christianson / Mosher	L

Sheet E	1	2	3	4	5	6	7	8	Final
(Quebec) Gionest / Desjardins 🔨	0	0	1	0	0	0	X	X	1
(Alberta) (Ontario) Gray-Withers / Pietrangelo	1	3	0	1	1	2	X	X	8

=== Draw 11 ===
Tuesday, March 24, 10:00 am

Sheet A	1	2	3	4	5	6	7	8	Final
(Yukon) Goncalves / Williams	1	0	1	0	0	1	0	X	3
(Ontario) Jones / Laing 🔨	0	1	0	2	1	0	4	X	8

Sheet B	1	2	3	4	5	6	7	8	Final
(Northwest Territories) Wainman / Saturnino 🔨	2	3	0	2	0	0	2	1	10
(Ontario) Nathan / Nathan	0	0	1	0	5	1	0	0	7

Sheet C	1	2	3	4	5	6	7	8	Final
(British Columbia) Woo / Wenzek	0	4	0	0	3	0	2	0	9
(Newfoundland and Labrador) Wiseman / Smith 🔨	1	0	3	1	0	3	0	4	12

Sheet D	1	2	3	4	5	6	7	8	Final
(Alberta) Peterman / Gallant	2	0	3	2	0	5	X	X	12
(Northern Ontario) Wright / Sinclair 🔨	0	1	0	0	1	0	X	X	2

Sheet E	1	2	3	4	5	6	7	8	Final
(Alberta) Homan / Bottcher 🔨	1	1	0	0	2	1	0	1	6
(Quebec) Tremblay / Lanoue	0	0	1	2	0	0	1	0	4

=== Draw 12 ===
Tuesday, March 24, 1:00 pm

Sheet A	1	2	3	4	5	6	7	8	Final
(Ontario) Craig / Craig 🔨	1	3	1	0	6	0	X	X	11
(Prince Edward Island) Lenentine / MacFayden	0	0	0	1	0	2	X	X	3

Sheet B	1	2	3	4	5	6	7	8	Final
(British Columbia) Loken / Tanaka 🔨	0	0	0	1	0	3	0	X	4
(Quebec) Sanscartier / Caron	2	1	1	0	1	0	4	X	9

Sheet C	1	2	3	4	5	6	7	8	Final
(Ontario) Weeks / Steep	0	4	1	0	0	1	0	X	6
(New Brunswick) Watson / Beland 🔨	1	0	0	1	1	0	1	X	4

Sheet D	1	2	3	4	5	6	7	8	Final
(Ontario) Ford / Campbell	1	0	1	0	2	0	1	1	6
(Alberta) (Ontario) Gray-Withers / Pietrangelo 🔨	0	1	0	1	0	2	0	0	4

Sheet E	1	2	3	4	5	6	7	8	Final
(Manitoba) Arbuckle / Macdonell 🔨	3	1	5	0	0	4	X	X	13
(Nunavut) Hulme / Van Strien	0	0	0	1	1	0	X	X	2

=== Draw 13 ===
Tuesday, March 24, 4:00 pm

Sheet A	1	2	3	4	5	6	7	8	Final
(Nova Scotia) Powers / Saunders 🔨	0	0	0	1	0	0	3	X	4
(New Brunswick) Adams / Robichaud	2	2	1	0	1	1	0	X	7

Sheet B	1	2	3	4	5	6	7	8	Final
(Quebec) Gionest / Desjardins 🔨	1	0	2	1	0	2	1	0	7
(Saskatchewan) Martin / Kleiter	0	3	0	0	2	0	0	3	8

Sheet C	1	2	3	4	5	6	7	8	Final
(Ontario) Jones / Laing	0	1	1	0	1	1	0	0	4
(Ontario) Neil / McDonald 🔨	1	0	0	3	0	0	2	1	7

Sheet D	1	2	3	4	5	6	7	8	Final
(Alberta) Cinnamon / Tao	2	1	0	2	0	0	1	2	8
(Alberta) Homan / Bottcher 🔨	0	0	1	0	1	3	0	0	5

Sheet E	1	2	3	4	5	6	7	8	Final
(Newfoundland and Labrador) Wiseman / Smith	0	0	0	0	0	1	X	X	1
(Ontario) Brunton / Horgan 🔨	2	2	1	1	1	0	X	X	7

=== Draw 14 ===
Tuesday, March 24, 7:00 pm

Sheet A	1	2	3	4	5	6	7	8	Final
(Ontario) Ford / Campbell 🔨	1	1	1	0	0	2	0	0	5
(Ontario) Nathan / Nathan	0	0	0	1	1	0	1	1	4

Sheet B	1	2	3	4	5	6	7	8	Final
(Yukon) Goncalves / Williams	1	0	1	0	0	0	1	X	3
(New Brunswick) Watson / Beland 🔨	0	2	0	2	2	1	0	X	7

Sheet C	1	2	3	4	5	6	7	8	Final
(Quebec) Tremblay / Lanoue 🔨	0	1	2	0	4	0	2	0	9
(Northern Ontario) Wright / Sinclair	1	0	0	3	0	1	0	5	10

Sheet D	1	2	3	4	5	6	7	8	Final
(British Columbia) Woo / Wenzek 🔨	2	4	2	2	3	0	X	X	13
(Nunavut) Hulme / Van Strien	0	0	0	0	0	1	X	X	1

Sheet E	Final
(Nova Scotia) Christianson / Mosher	L
(Northwest Territories) Wainman / Saturnino 🔨	W

=== Draw 15 ===
Wednesday, March 25, 10:00 am

Sheet A	1	2	3	4	5	6	7	8	Final
(Northwest Territories) Wainman / Saturnino	0	2	0	2	0	0	3	0	7
(Quebec) Gionest / Desjardins 🔨	2	0	3	0	1	1	0	1	8

Sheet B	1	2	3	4	5	6	7	8	Final
(Northern Ontario) Wright / Sinclair 🔨	1	0	3	0	1	0	3	0	8
(Alberta) Cinnamon / Tao	0	4	0	2	0	3	0	1	10

Sheet C	1	2	3	4	5	6	7	8	Final
(New Brunswick) Adams / Robichaud 🔨	0	3	0	1	2	0	1	2	9
(Manitoba) Arbuckle / Macdonell	1	0	2	0	0	2	0	0	5

Sheet D	1	2	3	4	5	6	7	8	Final
(Quebec) Sanscartier / Caron	0	1	0	1	2	2	0	0	6
(Ontario) Weeks / Steep 🔨	2	0	1	0	0	0	1	1	5

Sheet E	1	2	3	4	5	6	7	8	Final
(Alberta) Peterman / Gallant	0	0	1	0	2	0	1	X	4
(Ontario) Craig / Craig 🔨	3	1	0	4	0	1	0	X	9

=== Draw 16 ===
Wednesday, March 25, 1:00 pm

Sheet A	1	2	3	4	5	6	7	8	Final
(Ontario) Neil / McDonald 🔨	0	0	1	0	1	2	1	1	6
(British Columbia) Loken / Tanaka	1	1	0	2	0	0	0	0	4

Sheet B	Final
(Alberta) (Ontario) Gray-Withers / Pietrangelo 🔨	W
(Nova Scotia) Christianson / Mosher	L

Sheet C	1	2	3	4	5	6	7	8	9	Final
(Ontario) Brunton / Horgan	0	0	2	0	3	0	1	0	1	7
(Nova Scotia) Powers / Saunders 🔨	1	1	0	1	0	2	0	1	0	6

Sheet D	1	2	3	4	5	6	7	8	Final
(Prince Edward Island) Lenentine / MacFayden	0	0	0	0	3	0	X	X	3
(Quebec) Tremblay / Lanoue 🔨	5	2	2	2	0	1	X	X	12

Sheet E	1	2	3	4	5	6	7	8	Final
(New Brunswick) Watson / Beland 🔨	1	0	0	0	1	1	1	0	4
(Ontario) Jones / Laing	0	3	1	2	0	0	0	1	7

=== Draw 17 ===
Wednesday, March 25, 4:00 pm

Sheet A	1	2	3	4	5	6	7	8	Final
(Nunavut) Hulme / Van Strien	2	0	0	0	0	0	X	X	2
(Newfoundland and Labrador) Wiseman / Smith 🔨	0	6	4	1	2	3	X	X	16

Sheet B	1	2	3	4	5	6	7	8	9	Final
(British Columbia) Woo / Wenzek	2	0	0	0	4	0	1	0	0	7
(Manitoba) Arbuckle / Macdonell 🔨	0	1	2	1	0	2	0	1	2	9

Sheet C	1	2	3	4	5	6	7	8	Final
(Alberta) Peterman / Gallant 🔨	1	0	0	2	0	1	0	X	4
(Alberta) Homan / Bottcher	0	2	1	0	1	0	3	X	7

Sheet D	1	2	3	4	5	6	7	8	Final
(Ontario) Weeks / Steep 🔨	0	0	2	3	0	2	0	X	7
(Yukon) Goncalves / Williams	1	1	0	0	1	0	1	X	4

Sheet E	1	2	3	4	5	6	7	8	Final
(Saskatchewan) Martin / Kleiter 🔨	1	2	2	0	2	0	1	X	8
(Ontario) Nathan / Nathan	0	0	0	2	0	2	0	X	4

== Playoffs ==
Qualification Games
8	(Alberta) (Ontario) Gray-Withers / Pietrangelo	10
9	(Saskatchewan) Martin / Kleiter	2
5	(Alberta) Homan / Bottcher	11
12	(Ontario) Craig / Craig	5
7	(Ontario) Neil / McDonald	7
10	(Ontario) Weeks / Steep	6
6	(New Brunswick) Adams / Robichaud	8
11	(Ontario) Jones / Laing	5

Quarterfinals
1	(Ontario) Brunton / Horgan	7
8	(Alberta) (Ontario) Gray-Withers / Pietrangelo	8
4	(Quebec) Sanscartier / Caron	4
5	(Alberta) Homan / Bottcher	8
2	(Ontario) Ford / Campbell	7
7	(Ontario) Neil / McDonald	5
3	(Alberta) Cinnamon / Tao	11
6	(New Brunswick) Adams / Robichaud	9

Semifinals
8	(Alberta) (Ontario) Gray-Withers / Pietrangelo	6
5	(Alberta) Homan / Bottcher	4
2	(Ontario) Ford / Campbell	9
3	(Alberta) Cinnamon / Tao	11

Final
8	(Alberta) (Ontario) Gray-Withers / Pietrangelo	10
3	(Alberta) Cinnamon / Tao	9

=== Qualification games ===
Thursday, March 26, 1:00 pm

Sheet A	1	2	3	4	5	6	7	8	Final
(Alberta) (Ontario) Gray-Withers / Pietrangelo	0	1	2	4	1	0	2	X	10
(Saskatchewan) Martin / Kleiter 🔨	1	0	0	0	0	1	0	X	2

Sheet B	1	2	3	4	5	6	7	8	Final
(New Brunswick) Adams / Robichaud 🔨	2	1	0	1	0	2	0	2	8
(Ontario) Jones / Laing	0	0	2	0	1	0	2	0	5

Sheet C	1	2	3	4	5	6	7	8	Final
(Alberta) Homan / Bottcher 🔨	2	4	0	2	0	3	X	X	11
(Ontario) Craig / Craig	0	0	2	0	3	0	X	X	5

Sheet D	1	2	3	4	5	6	7	8	Final
(Ontario) Neil / McDonald 🔨	4	0	1	1	0	0	0	1	7
(Ontario) Weeks / Steep	0	2	0	0	1	1	2	0	6

=== Quarterfinals ===
Thursday, March 26, 7:00 pm

Sheet A	1	2	3	4	5	6	7	8	Final
(Quebec) Sanscartier / Caron	0	1	0	0	1	0	2	0	4
(Alberta) Homan / Bottcher 🔨	2	0	2	1	0	1	0	2	8

Sheet B	1	2	3	4	5	6	7	8	Final
(Ontario) Ford / Campbell 🔨	0	1	0	2	0	1	1	2	7
(Ontario) Neil / McDonald	1	0	1	0	3	0	0	0	5

Sheet C	1	2	3	4	5	6	7	8	Final
(Ontario) Brunton / Horgan 🔨	1	0	4	0	1	0	1	0	7
(Alberta) (Ontario) Gray-Withers / Pietrangelo	0	1	0	1	0	2	0	4	8

Sheet D	1	2	3	4	5	6	7	8	Final
(Alberta) Cinnamon / Tao	0	2	0	2	1	0	3	3	11
(New Brunswick) Adams / Robichaud 🔨	3	0	3	0	0	3	0	0	9

=== Semifinals ===
Friday, March 27, 9:30 am

Sheet C	1	2	3	4	5	6	7	8	Final
(Alberta) (Ontario) Gray-Withers / Pietrangelo	1	0	1	0	1	0	1	2	6
(Alberta) Homan / Bottcher 🔨	0	2	0	1	0	1	0	0	4

Sheet D	1	2	3	4	5	6	7	8	Final
(Ontario) Ford / Campbell 🔨	4	2	0	2	0	0	1	0	9
(Alberta) Cinnamon / Tao	0	0	2	0	4	1	0	4	11

=== Final ===
Friday, March 27, 1:00 pm

Sheet D	1	2	3	4	5	6	7	8	Final
(Alberta) (Ontario) Gray-Withers / Pietrangelo	0	3	1	0	2	1	0	3	10
(Alberta) Cinnamon / Tao 🔨	6	0	0	2	0	0	1	0	9
