= Sabrevois =

Sabrevois may refer to several places in Québec, Canada:

- Sabrevois, a village of Sainte-Anne-de-Sabrevois (parish municipality), MRC Le Haut-Richelieu Regional County Municipality, Montérégie
- Sabrevois Park, public park of Boucherville (City), Montérégie
- Sabrevois River, stream in Boucherville (City), Montérégie
- Seigneurie Sabrevois, Saint-Sébastien (Municipalité), MRC Le Haut-Richelieu Regional County Municipality, Montérégie
- Sainte-Anne-de-Sabrevois, municipality MRC Le Haut-Richelieu Regional County Municipality, Montérégie
