= Marien =

Marien may refer to:

- Domkirche St. Marien (English: St. Mary's Cathedral), the modern Roman Catholic cathedral in Sankt Georg, Hamburg, Germany
- Mariendom (Hamburg) (English: St. Mary's Cathedral), the ancient cathedral in Altstadt, Hamburg, Holy Roman Empire, demolished between 1804 and 1807
- Mariendom (English: St. Mary's Cathedral), the Roman Catholic cathedral of Speyer, Palatinate, Germany
- Marien Ngouabi University, the only state-funded university in the Republic of Congo
- Marién, a chiefdom of Hispaniola
- Saint-Marien, commune in the Creuse department in central France
- Sankt Marien, municipality in the district Linz-Land in Upper Austria, Austria
- Stade Joseph Marien, multi-use stadium in Brussels, Belgium, named after the sports administrator Joseph Marien (died 1933)

== People ==
- Marien Tailhandier (1665–1738), soldier-surgeon after his arrival in Canada in 1685
- Frank Marien (1890–1936), Australian editor of Smith's Weekly
- Joseph Marien (1900–1950), Belgian Olympic runner
- Marien Oulton Dreyer (1911–1980)
- Marcel Mariën (1920–1993), Belgian surrealist (later Situationist), poet, essayist, photographer, collagist, filmmaker
- Léopold Marien (1934–2018), former Belgian decathlete
- Marien Ngouabi (or N'Gouabi, 1938–1977), military President of the Republic of the Congo from 1969 to 1977
- Robert Marien (born 1955), Québécois (Canadian) actor, singer, and songwriter
- Marien Michel Ngouabi (born 1980), Congolese former swimmer
- Hanna Mariën (born 1982), Belgian sprinter who specializes in the 200 metres
- Rudi Mariën, Belgian scientist and businessman
