= Super cyclone =

The term super cyclone (or supercyclone) may refer to:

- 1999 Odisha cyclone, a strong tropical storm
- Cyclone Amphan, a strong tropical storm that affected mainly West Bengal in May 2020
- St-Just Super-Cyclone, a Canadian homebuilt aircraft design
- Any large tropical cyclone
- Super Cyclone, a 2012 film from The Asylum studio written and directed by Liz Adams
