= St-Just Cyclone =

Canadian amateur-built aircraft

Cyclone
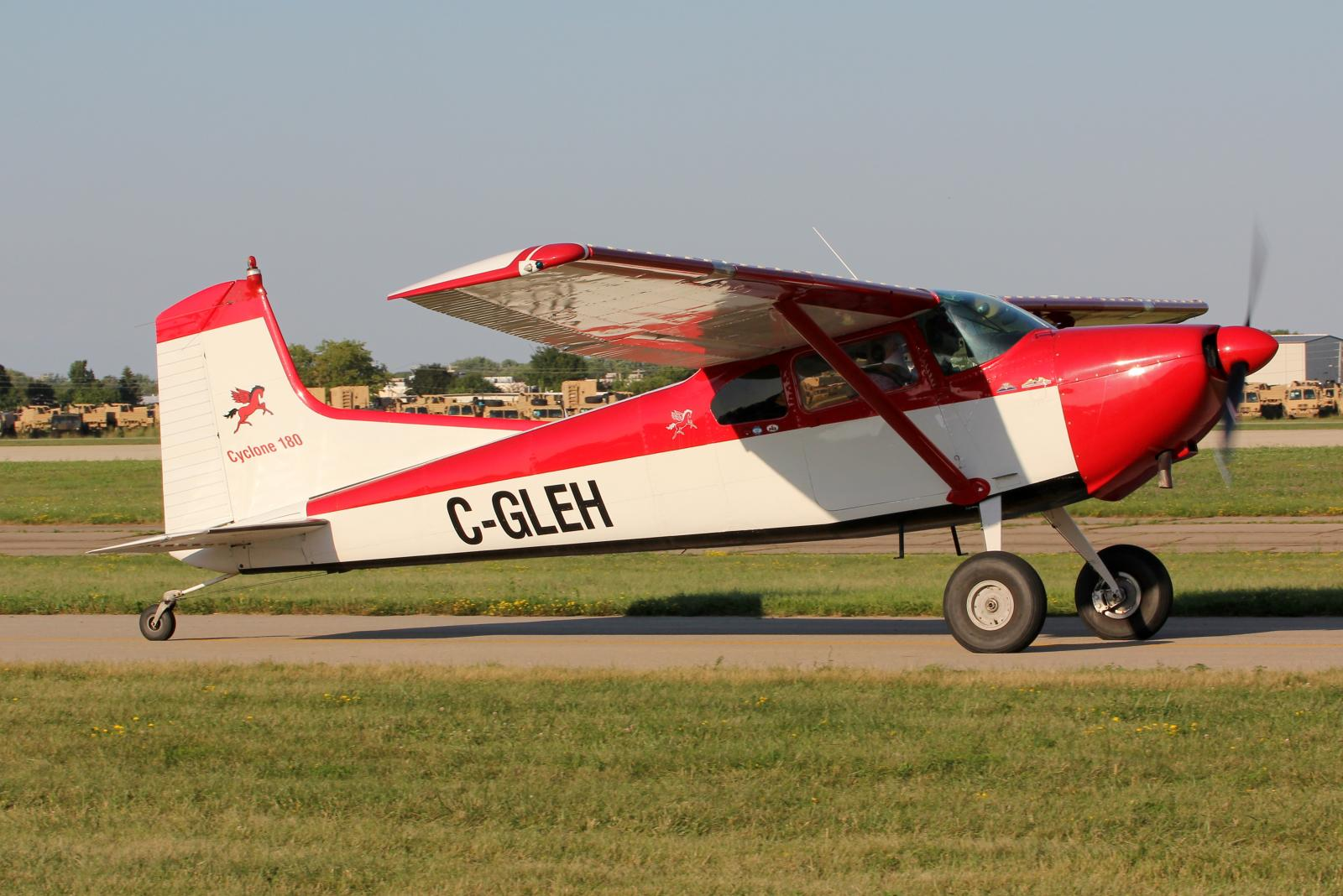

General information
- Type: Homebuilt aircraft
- National origin: Canada
- Manufacturer: St-Just Aviation
- Status: Production completed
- Number built: At least 26

History
- Introduction date: 1992
- First flight: 1992
- Developed from: Cessna 180
- Variant: St-Just Super-Cyclone

The St-Just Cyclone, also called the St-Just Cyclone 180, is a Canadian homebuilt aircraft that was designed and produced by St-Just Aviation of Mirabel, Quebec. The company has since moved to Boucherville, Quebec. While it was available, the aircraft was supplied as a kit and in the form of plans for amateur construction.

The Cyclone was later developed into the higher gross weight (3,500 lb (1,600 kg)) St-Just Super-Cyclone, which superseded it in production.

In 2021, the rights to the Cyclone aircraft were acquired by Bushliner Aircraft LLC of Granite Falls, WA.

== Design and development ==
The Cyclone is a replica of the Cessna 180 that incorporates modifications and improvements, such as an extended wing span, greater wing area and vertically hinged doors. It features a strut-braced high-wing, a four-seat enclosed cabin accessed via doors, fixed conventional landing gear and a single engine in tractor configuration.

The aircraft is made from sheet aluminum, with the kit airframe parts preformed with pilot holes to allow construction without the use of jigs. Its 38.00 ft (11.6 m) span wing employs a NACA 2412 airfoil, mounts flaps and has a wing area of 181.00 sq ft (16.815 m^{2}). The acceptable power range is 200 to 250 hp (149 to 186 kW) and the standard engine used is the 230 hp (172 kW) Continental O-470.

The Cyclone has a typical empty weight of 1,700 lb (770 kg) and a gross weight of 3,000 lb (1,400 kg), giving a useful load of 1,300 lb (590 kg).

The manufacturer estimated the construction time from the supplied kit as 2000 hours.

== Operational history ==
In December 2013, 23 examples were registered in Canada with Transport Canada and three in the United States with the Federal Aviation Administration.

== Specifications (Cyclone) ==
Data from AeroCrafter

General characteristics

- Crew: one
- Capacity: three passengers
- Length: 26 ft 0 in (7.92 m)
- Wingspan: 38 ft 0 in (11.58 m)
- Wing area: 181.00 sq ft (16.815 m^{2})
- Airfoil: NACA 2412
- Empty weight: 1,700 lb (771 kg)
- Gross weight: 3,000 lb (1,361 kg)
- Powerplant: 1 × Continental O-470 six cylinder, air-cooled, four stroke aircraft engine, 230 hp (170 kW)
- Propellers: 2-bladed constant speed propeller

Performance

- Maximum speed: 170 mph (270 km/h, 150 kn)
- Cruise speed: 158 mph (254 km/h, 137 kn)
- Stall speed: 37 mph (60 km/h, 32 kn) flaps down
- Range: 870 mi (1,400 km, 760 nmi)
- Service ceiling: 18,000 ft (5,500 m)
- Rate of climb: 1,300 ft/min (6.6 m/s)
- Wing loading: 16.6 lb/sq ft (81 kg/m^{2})
