= Rivière aux Pins (Boucherville) =

- Location within Quebec

Location
- Countries: Canada
- Province: Quebec
- Administrative region: Montérégie

Physical characteristics
- Source: Urban stream
  - location: Boucherville
  - coordinates: 45.248075°N 73.434861°W
  - elevation: 10 m (33 ft)
- Mouth: Saint Lawrence River
  - location: Boucherville
  - coordinates: 45.64778°N 73.44583°W
  - elevation: 7 m (23 ft)
- Length: 5.7 km (3.5 mi)

Basin features
- Tributaries
  - right: Ruisseau des Frênes

The rivière aux Pins (English: Pine River) is a tributary of the south shore of the Saint Lawrence River, flowing in the city of Boucherville, in the administrative region of Montérégie, southwest of province of Quebec, in Canada.

The intermediate part of this watercourse delimits the agricultural area and the urban area of Boucherville.

The river surface is generally frozen from mid-December to the end of March. Safe circulation on the ice is generally done from the end of December to the beginning of March. The water level of the river varies with the seasons and the precipitation.

== Geography ==
The main hydrographic slopes neighboring the Rivière aux Pins are:

- north side: Saint-Charles River (Varennes), Pays Brûlé stream;
- east side: La Grande Décharge, Narbonne stream;
- south side: Sabrevois River;
- west side: St. Lawrence River.

The Rivière aux Pins rises in the heart of the town of Boucherville along rue de la Rivière-aux-Pins which delimits the west side of the Parc de la Rivière-aux-Pins. This river flows over 5.7 kilometres (3.5 mi), with a drop of 3 metres (9.8 ft), according to the following segments:

- 4.2 kilometres (2.6 mi) northwards in an urban area between the railroad (located on the west side) and the route 132 (located on the east side) where it collects the Frênes stream (coming from the south-east), up to the railway;
- 1.5 kilometres (0.93 mi) north-west in an agricultural zone and crossing a marsh in Parc de la Frayère, to its mouth.

The mouth of the Pins river is located on the southeast bank of the St. Lawrence River, facing the southern sector of the Varennes islands, at the place called "La Frayère", either:

- 3.2 kilometres (2.0 mi) east of the shore of Pointe-aux-Trembles;
- 3.1 kilometres (1.9 mi) upstream of the mouth of the Saint-Charles River (Varennes);
- 8.1 kilometres (5.0 mi) north of the Louis-Hippolyte Lafontaine Bridge–Tunnel.

== Toponymy ==
This descriptive designation refers to the red and white pines that once inhabited its banks. This designation was attributed to him at the end of the 17th century. The watercourse was also designated "Rivière De Muy", the name of a fief conceded in 1695 and located near its mouth.

The toponym "Rivière aux Pins" was formalized on December 5, 1968, at the Commission de toponymie du Québec.

== See also ==
- List of rivers of Quebec
