= Noveko International =

Noveko International (TSX: EKO) was a Canadian corporation based in Boucherville, Quebec. It made antimicrobial air filters, antimicrobial surgical masks and respirators, hand sanitizers, and portable ultrasound machines. It has a patent for the antimicrobial technology used in their air filters and face masks. The company was involved in a dispute with five former employees who left to set up Industrie Orkan, accusing the former employees of disloyal competition, while the employees claimed that the company still owed unpaid salaries and commissions.

Its shares were traded on the Toronto Stock Exchange since July 2008 until it failed to meet listing requirements in July 2013.

In October 2014, the company announced that it planned to make a proposal under the Bankruptcy and Insolvency Act.
