= St-Just Aviation =

Canadian amateur-built aircraft manufacturer

- Company type: Privately held company
- Industry: Aerospace
- Fate: Out of business
- Headquarters: Boucherville, Quebec, Canada
- Products: Kit aircraft

St-Just Aviation is a Canadian aircraft manufacturer based in Boucherville, Quebec, a suburb of Montreal. The company specializes in the design and manufacture of aircraft kits for bushplane operations, based on Cessna designs. The company was originally located in Mirabel.

By 2023 the company had ceased business and the Super Cyclone kit production moved to Bushliner Aircraft Manufacturing of Granite Falls, Washington, who were building it under the name Bushliner 1850EX.

== Aircraft ==
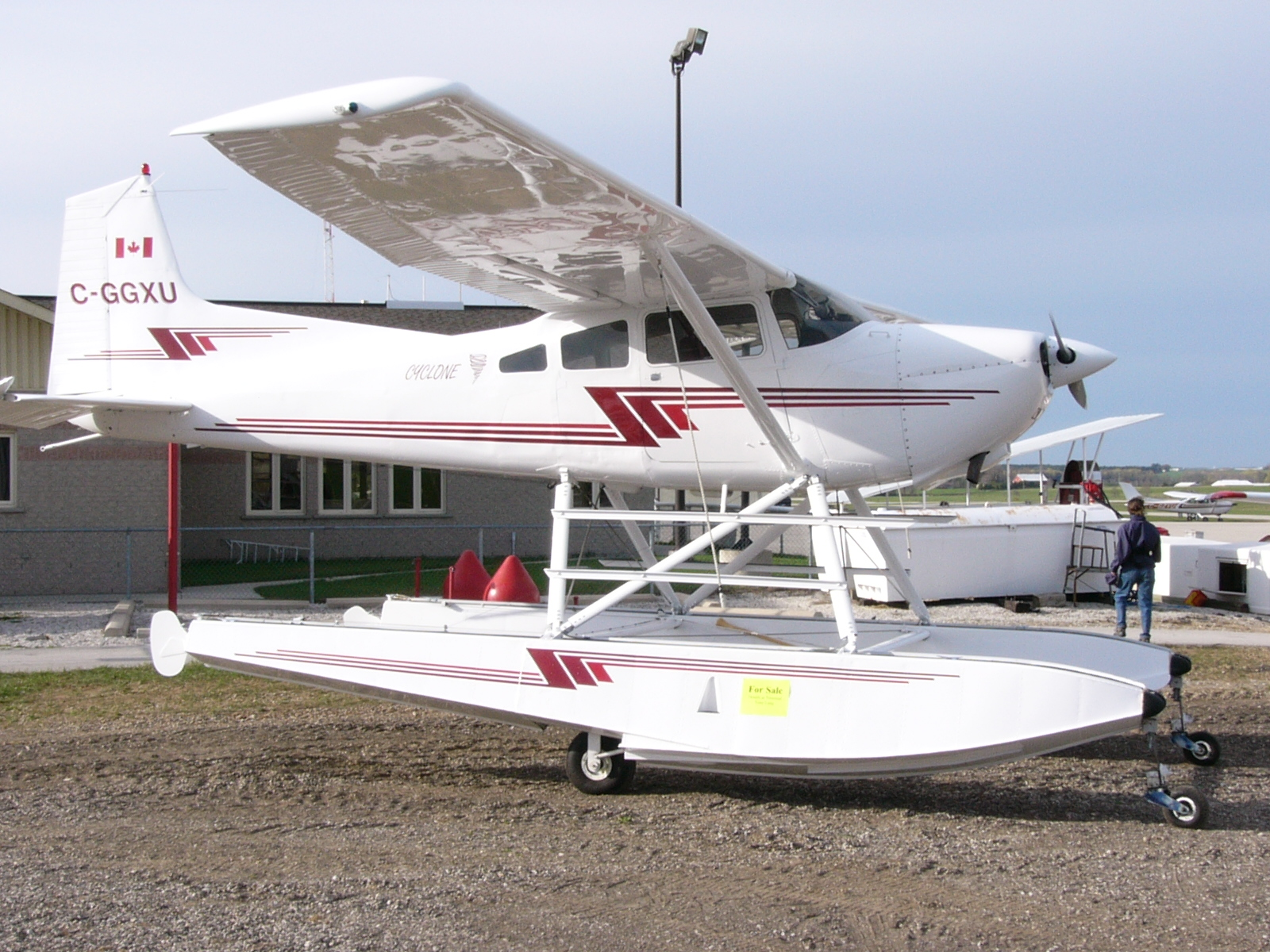
St-Just Super-Cyclone on amphibious floats

Summary of aircraft built by St-Just Aviation
Model name	First flight	Number built	Type
St-Just Cyclone	1992	26 (2013)	bush aircraft
St-Just Super-Cyclone	1999	7 (2013)	bush aircraft
