= Saint-Charles River (Varennes) =

Location
- Countries: Canada
- Province: Quebec
- Administrative region: Montérégie
- Regional County Municipality: Marguerite-D'Youville Regional County Municipality

Physical characteristics
- Source: Little lake on a golf club
  - location: Varennes
  - coordinates: 45.72036°N 73.32266°W
  - elevation: 31 m (102 ft)
- Mouth: Saint Lawrence River
  - location: Varennes
  - coordinates: 45.64778°N 73.44583°W
  - elevation: 7 m (23 ft)
- Length: 13.9 km (8.6 mi)

Basin features
- Tributaries
  - left: (upstream) Pays Brûlé stream, Petit Bois ditch, Geoffrion-Riendeau stream, Garand stream
  - right: (upstream) Baronnie-Picardie creek.

The rivière Saint-Charles is a tributary of the south shore of the Saint Lawrence River, flowing in the city of Varennes, in the Marguerite-D'Youville Regional County Municipality, in the administrative region of Montérégie, southwest of province of Quebec, to Canada.

The lower course of the Saint-Charles river more or less delimits the urban part of Varennes passing on the south side. The intermediate and upper parts flow in agricultural area.

The river surface is generally frozen from mid-December to the end of March. Safe circulation on the ice is generally done from the end of December to the beginning of March. The water level of the river varies with the seasons and the precipitation.

== Geography ==
The main hydrographic slopes neighboring the Saint-Charles River are:

- north side: Notre-Dame stream;
- east side: Le Grand Ruisseau, Richelieu River;
- south side: Rivière aux Pins (Boucherville), Sabrevois River;
- west side: Notre-Dame stream, St. Lawrence River.

The Rivière aux Pins rises at the mouth of a small lake (length: 0.35 kilometres (0.22 mi); altitude: 31 metres (102 ft)) set up in the heart of a golf course. This river flows over 13.9 kilometres (8.6 mi), with a drop of 24 metres (79 ft), according to the following segments:

- 7.1 kilometres (4.4 mi) first on 0.4 kilometres (0.25 mi) towards the northwest crossing in the golf course, then on 6.7 kilometres (4.2 mi) towards the south -west in agricultural area to Autoroute 30;
- 6.8 kilometres (4.2 mi) first towards the west in the agricultural zone, then towards the south-west passing in small serpentines on the south side of the limit of the urban zone of Varennes, collecting the Ditch of the Petit Bois (coming from the south), crossing route 132 and branching north-west at the end of the segment, to its mouth.

The mouth of the Saint-Charles river is located on the southeast bank of the Saint Lawrence River heart of the city of Varennes, opposite Île Sainte-Thérèse, either:

- 1.4 kilometres (0.87 mi) east of the shore of Île Sainte-Thérèse;
- 3.1 kilometres (1.9 mi) downstream of the mouth of the Rivière aux Pins (Boucherville);
- 11.1 kilometres (6.9 mi) north of the Louis-Hippolyte Lafontaine Bridge–Tunnel.

== Toponymy ==
The toponym "Rivière aux Pins" was formalized on December 5, 1968, at the Commission de toponymie du Québec.

== See also ==
- List of rivers of Quebec
