= St-Just Super-Cyclone =

Canadian amateur-built aircraft

Super-Cyclone
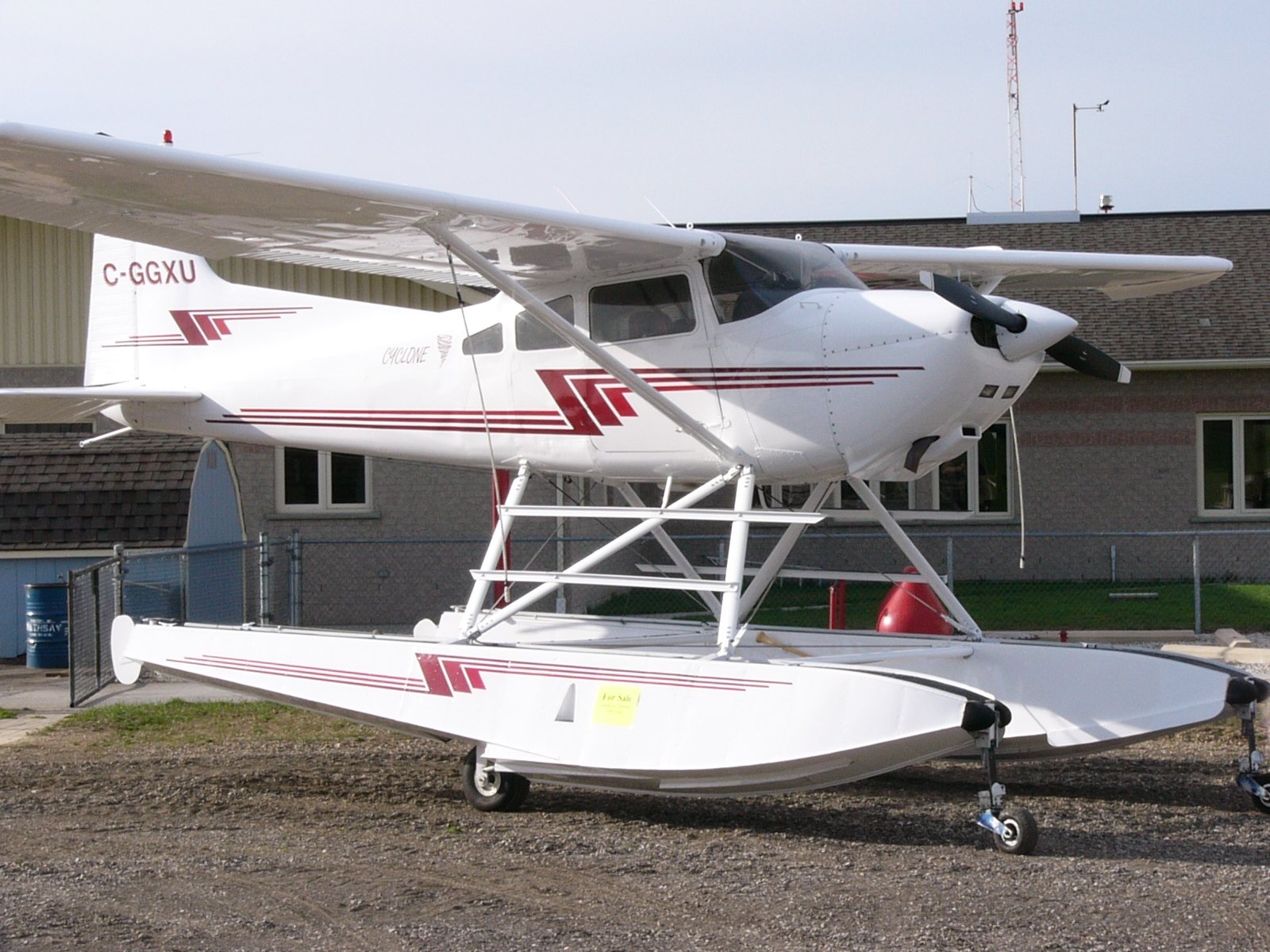

General information
- Type: Amateur-built aircraft
- National origin: Canada
- Manufacturer: St-Just Aviation; Bushliner Aircraft Manufacturing
- Status: In production (2023)
- Number built: At least 7 (2013)

History
- Introduction date: 1999
- First flight: 1999
- Developed from: St-Just Cyclone, Cessna 180 and Cessna 185

The St-Just Super-Cyclone is a Canadian amateur-built aircraft that was at one time produced by St-Just Aviation of Boucherville, Quebec. By 2023 production had passed to Bushliner Aircraft Manufacturing of Granite Falls, Washington who were building it as the Bushliner 1850EX. The aircraft is supplied as plans or as a kit for amateur construction.

== Design and development ==
The Super-Cyclone is a development of the earlier St-Just Cyclone and is based on the Cessna 180 and Cessna 185 airframe design. The kit manufacturer terms it "a replica" of the Cessna designs. Like the 180/185 it features a strut-braced high-wing, a four-seat enclosed cabin accessed via doors, fixed conventional landing gear, skis or floats and a single engine in tractor configuration.

The aircraft is made from sheet 2024-T3 aluminum, with some parts made from 6061-T6 and 7075-T6. Its 38.1 ft (11.6 m) extended-span wing employs a NACA 2412 airfoil, has an area of 191 sq ft (17.7 m^{2}) and mounts large Fowler flaps. The aircraft can be equipped with engines ranging from 200 to 350 hp (149 to 261 kW). The standard engine used is the 300 hp (224 kW) Continental IO-520 four-stroke powerplant. The design includes improvements over the Cessna, including vertically hinged doors and longer span flaps combined with shorter span ailerons, in a similar manner to the Cessna 206.

== Operational history ==
In March 2017 there were seven Super-Cyclones on the Transport Canada Civil Aircraft Register and one registered with the US Federal Aviation Administration.

== Specifications (Super-Cyclone) ==
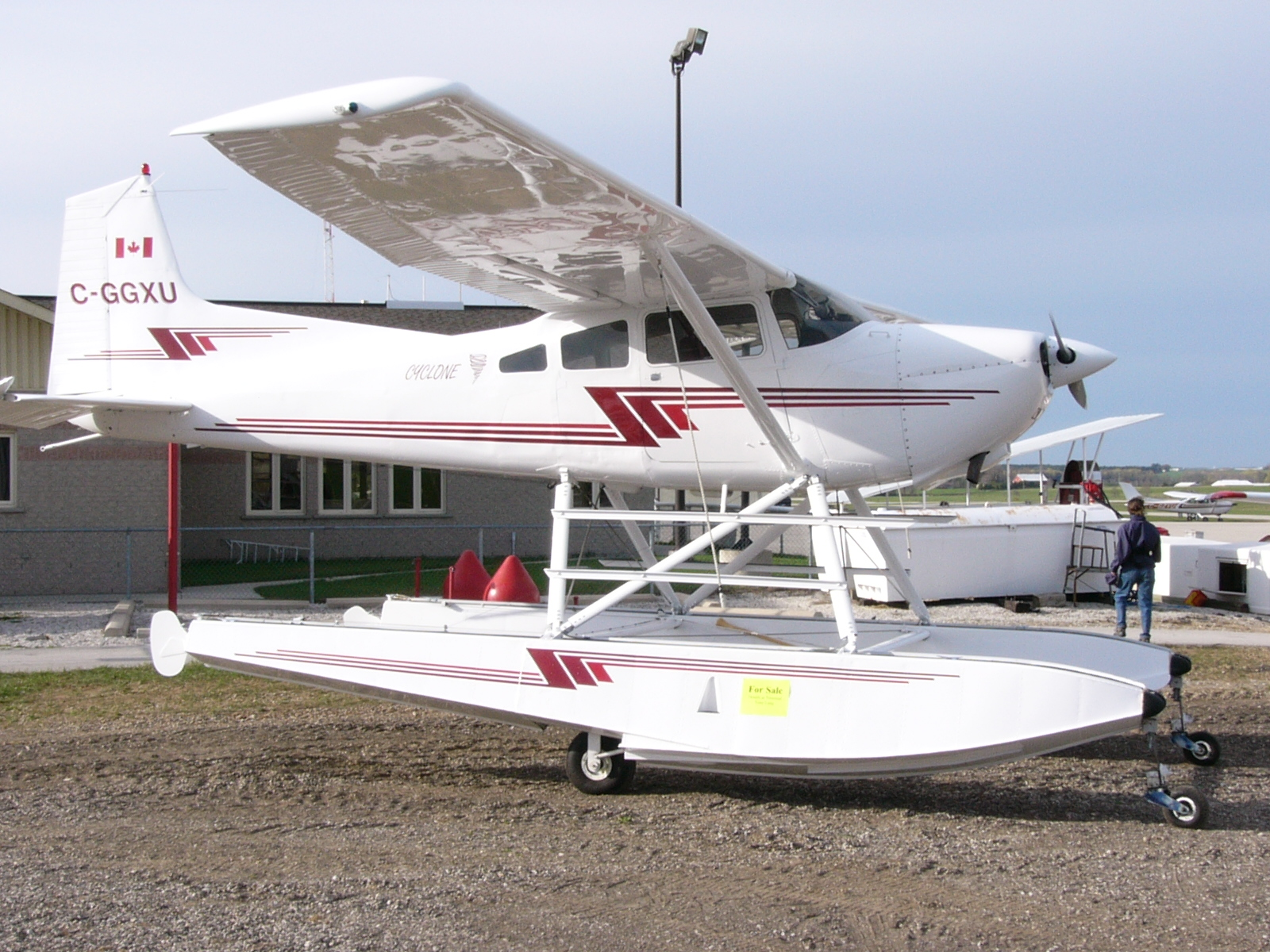
St-Just Super-Cyclone on amphibious floats

Data from Bayerl, Kitplanes and St-Just Aviation

General characteristics

- Crew: one
- Capacity: four passengers
- Length: 38 ft (12 m)
- Wingspan: 38 ft 1 in (11.6 m)
- Wing area: 191.0 sq ft (17.74 m^{2})
- Empty weight: 1,800 lb (816 kg)
- Gross weight: 3,500 lb (1,588 kg)
- Fuel capacity: 340 litres (75 imp gal; 90 US gal)
- Powerplant: 1 × Continental IO-520 six cylinder, air-cooled, four stroke aircraft engine, 300 hp (220 kW)
- Propellers: 3-bladed constant speed

Performance

- Maximum speed: 170 mph (280 km/h, 150 kn)
- Cruise speed: 165 mph (265 km/h, 143 kn)
- Stall speed: 43 mph (70 km/h, 38 kn)
- Range: 1,200 mi (1,900 km, 1,000 nmi)
- Rate of climb: 1,600 ft/min (8.1 m/s)
- Wing loading: 18.3 lb/sq ft (89.5 kg/m^{2})
