= 2026 World Mixed Doubles Qualification Event (October) =

- Host city: Lafayette, Colorado, United States
- Arena: Rock Creek Curling
- Dates: October 2–8
- Qualifiers: United States; Latvia; France

The 2026 World Mixed Doubles Qualification Event is a curling event that was held from October 2 to 8, 2026 at Rock Creek Curling in Lafayette, Colorado, United States. This event qualified three teams (United States, Latvia, and France) for the 2027 World Mixed Doubles Curling Championship in Lohja, Finland in January 2027. This was an open event, opened to any Member Association who has not already qualified for the 2027 World Championship through their placement at the 2026 World Mixed Doubles Curling Championship or Finland, who pre-qualified as host of the 2027 World Mixed Doubles Curling Championship.

== Teams ==
The teams are as follows:

Austria	Belgium	Brazil	Chinese Taipei
Female: Hannah Augustin; Male: Martin Reichel	Female: Annemiek Huiskamp; Male: Pim van Vlaenderen	Female: Elen Sumi; Male: Sergio Vilela	Female: Amanda Chou; Male: Brendon Liu
England	France	Guyana	Hong Kong
Female: Marianna Ward; Male: Matthew Waring	Female: Stéphanie Barbarin; Male: Wilfrid Coulot	Female: Farzana Hussain; Male: Rayad Husain	Female: Ling-Yue Hung; Male: Jason Chang
India	Ireland	Kenya	Latvia
Female: Richa Patel; Male: Sudheer Reddy	Female: Emily Whelan; Male: Kyle Paradis	Female: Mary Kinyua; Male: Walter Wanjala	Female: Katrīna Gaidule; Male: Roberts Reinis Buncis
Mexico	Nigeria	Pakistan	Philippines
Female: Danielle Serra; Male: Diego Tompkins	Female: Jasmin Hashi; Male: Harold Woods III	Female: Sabena Islam; Male: Kaamraan Islam	Female: Kyra Manayan; Male: Alexei dela Peña
Poland	Portugal	Puerto Rico	Romania
Female: Klaudia Wajda; Male: Konrad Stych	Female: Arlete Rodrigues; Male: Benjamin Silva	Female: Linda Crank; Male: Robert Fisher	Female: Valentina Banghi; Male: Allen Coliban
Slovakia	Slovenia	Spain	Turkey
Female: Paulina Hajduk; Male: Jan Horáček	Female: Ema Kavčič; Male: Štefan Sever	Female: Paula Olivan Salvador; Male: Mikel Unanue	Female: Melisa Cömert; Male: Selahattin Eșer
Ukraine	United States		
Female: Oleksandra Kononenko; Male: Yaroslav Shchur	Female: Cory Thiesse; Male: Korey Dropkin		

== Round robin standings ==
Final Round Robin Standings

Key
Teams to Playoffs

Group A	W	L	W–L	DSC
United States	8	0	–	18.008
Poland	7	1	–	18.708
Austria	6	2	–	73.550
Slovakia	5	3	–	58.783
Pakistan	3	5	1–1	43.900
Hong Kong	3	5	1–1	78.325
Nigeria	3	5	1–1	94.133
Philippines	1	7	–	54.325
India	0	8	–	88.300

Group B	W	L	W–L	DSC
France	7	0	–	40.450
Chinese Taipei	6	1	–	68.808
Mexico	5	2	–	52.383
Turkey	3	4	1–1	52.333
Ireland	3	4	1–1	60.142
Belgium	3	4	1–1	74.208
Portugal	1	6	–	95.583
Puerto Rico	0	7	–	145.367

Group C	W	L	W–L	DSC
Latvia	8	0	–	38.950
Ukraine	5	3	2–2	27.950
Spain	5	3	2–2	36.308
England	5	3	2–2	39.250
Slovenia	5	3	2–2	49.833
Guyana	5	3	2–2	103.817
Romania	2	6	–	110.792
Brazil	1	7	–	108.283
Kenya	0	8	–	160.475

Ranking of 3rd Place Teams	Group	DSC
Spain	C	36.308
Mexico	B	52.383
Austria	A	73.550

Group A Round Robin Summary Table
Pos.	Country	Austria	Hong Kong	India	Nigeria	Pakistan	Philippines	Poland	Slovakia	United States	Record
3	Austria	—	10–5	8–2	11–6	7–5	12–5	4–7	11–4	2–9	6–2
6	Hong Kong	5–10	—	12–6	6–7	6–3	8–2	3–8	3–10	1–11	3–5
9	India	2–8	6–12	—	4–7	4–9	6–7	2–13	3–11	3–8	0–8
7	Nigeria	6–11	7–6	7–4	—	1–12	10–1	4–10	2–11	1–16	3–5
5	Pakistan	5–7	3–6	9–4	12–1	—	7–2	4–6	5–10	1–11	3–5
8	Philippines	5–12	2–8	7–6	1–10	2–7	—	1–8	5–7	2–12	1–7
2	Poland	7–4	8–3	13–2	10–4	6–4	8–1	—	10–3	2–9	7–1
4	Slovakia	4–11	10–3	11–3	11–2	10–5	7–5	3–10	—	3–15	5–3
1	United States	9–2	11–1	8–3	16–1	11–1	12–2	9–2	15–3	—	8–0

Group B Round Robin Summary Table
Pos.	Country	Belgium	Chinese Taipei	France		Mexico	Portugal	Puerto Rico	Turkey	Record
6	Belgium	—	3–8	1–12	6–5	3–8	9–5	11–8	2–9	3–4
2	Chinese Taipei	8–3	—	1–10	9–4	7–4	7–4	7–3	7–5	6–1
1	France	12–1	10–1	—	8–5	8–2	12–4	13–0	12–3	7–0
5	Ireland	5–6	4–9	5–8	—	6–9	9–3	7–1	7–3	3–4
3	Mexico	8–3	4–7	2–8	9–6	—	10–4	12–2	9–6	5–2
7	Portugal	5–9	4–7	4–12	3–9	4–10	—	9–1	3–13	1–6
8	Puerto Rico	8–11	3–7	0–13	1–7	2–12	1–9	—	2–14	0–7
4	Turkey	9–2	5–7	3–12	3–7	6–9	13–3	14–2	—	3–4

Group C Round Robin Summary Table
Pos.	Country	Brazil	England	Guyana	Kenya	Latvia	Romania	Slovenia	Spain	Ukraine	Record
8	Brazil	—	4–10	0–13	10–3	0–7	3–10	2–10	2–12	1–7	1–7
4	England	10–4	—	5–6	14–1	6–9	8–4	9–4	6–5	5–9	5–3
6	Guyana	13–0	6–5	—	16–1	5–11	10–5	3–8	10–3	7–9	5–3
9	Kenya	3–10	1–14	1–16	—	0–22	0–14	1–16	1–12	3–15	0–8
1	Latvia	7–0	9–6	11–5	22–0	—	14–1	8–1	14–2	7–3	8–0
7	Romania	10–3	4–8	5–10	14–0	1–14	—	1–8	3–11	2–14	2–6
5	Slovenia	10–2	4–9	8–3	16–1	1–8	8–1	—	4–8	9–5	5–3
3	Spain	12–2	5–6	3–10	12–1	2–14	11–3	8–4	—	9–4	5–3
2	Ukraine	7–1	9–5	9–7	15–3	3–7	14–2	5–9	4–9	—	5–3

== Round robin results ==
All draw times are listed in Mountain Time Zone (UTC-07:00).

=== Draw 1 ===
Friday, October 2, 9:00

Sheet A	1	2	3	4	5	6	7	8	Final
France 🔨	0	2	3	3	3	1	X	X	12
Belgium	1	0	0	0	0	0	X	X	1

Sheet B	1	2	3	4	5	6	7	8	Final
India	0	0	0	1	2	0	0	X	3
United States 🔨	2	1	1	0	0	3	1	X	8

Sheet C	1	2	3	4	5	6	7	8	Final
Hong Kong 🔨	0	4	0	2	1	1	X	X	8
Philippines	1	0	1	0	0	0	X	X	2

Sheet D	1	2	3	4	5	6	7	8	Final
Guyana	1	0	2	2	0	0	X	X	5
Latvia 🔨	0	1	0	0	6	4	X	X	11

Sheet E	1	2	3	4	5	6	7	8	Final
Nigeria	0	2	0	0	0	0	0	X	2
Slovakia 🔨	4	0	1	1	2	1	2	X	11

=== Draw 2 ===
Friday, October 2, 13:00

Sheet A	1	2	3	4	5	6	7	8	Final
Poland 🔨	1	0	3	0	2	0	1	X	7
Austria	0	1	0	1	0	2	0	X	4

Sheet C	1	2	3	4	5	6	7	8	Final
Ireland	1	1	0	0	2	0	0	0	4
Chinese Taipei 🔨	0	0	3	1	0	1	1	3	9

Sheet D	1	2	3	4	5	6	7	8	Final
Kenya	0	1	0	1	0	0	1	X	3
Brazil 🔨	2	0	1	0	6	1	0	X	10

Sheet E	1	2	3	4	5	6	7	8	Final
Romania	0	2	0	0	1	0	0	X	3
Spain 🔨	4	0	2	1	0	2	2	X	11

Sheet F	1	2	3	4	5	6	7	8	Final
Mexico 🔨	4	0	1	1	0	4	2	X	12
Puerto Rico	0	1	0	0	1	0	0	X	2

=== Draw 3 ===
Friday, October 2, 18:00

Sheet A	1	2	3	4	5	6	7	8	Final
Slovakia	0	4	2	0	0	4	X	X	10
Hong Kong 🔨	1	0	0	1	1	0	X	X	3

Sheet B	1	2	3	4	5	6	7	8	Final
France 🔨	1	2	0	6	0	3	X	X	12
Portugal	0	0	2	0	2	0	X	X	4

Sheet C	1	2	3	4	5	6	7	8	Final
India	0	1	1	0	2	0	0	X	4
Pakistan 🔨	5	0	0	1	0	2	1	X	9

Sheet D	1	2	3	4	5	6	7	8	Final
Philippines 🔨	0	0	0	1	0	0	X	X	1
Nigeria	3	1	1	0	4	1	X	X	10

Sheet E	1	2	3	4	5	6	7	8	Final
Ukraine 🔨	0	1	0	0	1	0	1	0	3
Latvia	1	0	1	1	0	1	0	3	7

Sheet F	1	2	3	4	5	6	7	8	Final
Slovenia	0	0	0	2	1	1	0	X	4
England 🔨	1	4	3	0	0	0	1	X	9

=== Draw 4 ===
Saturday, October 3, 9:00

Sheet A	1	2	3	4	5	6	7	8	Final
United States 🔨	1	1	2	0	5	2	X	X	11
Pakistan	0	0	0	1	0	0	X	X	1

Sheet B	1	2	3	4	5	6	7	8	Final
Guyana	0	2	0	3	1	1	0	0	7
Ukraine 🔨	3	0	4	0	0	0	1	1	9

Sheet C	1	2	3	4	5	6	7	8	Final
Austria 🔨	4	0	3	0	0	1	2	1	11
Nigeria	0	2	0	3	1	0	0	0	6

Sheet E	1	2	3	4	5	6	7	8	Final
Hong Kong 🔨	2	0	4	0	1	0	5	X	12
India	0	1	0	1	0	4	0	X	6

=== Draw 5 ===
Saturday, October 3, 12:30

Sheet A	1	2	3	4	5	6	7	8	Final
Mexico 🔨	0	1	1	0	1	0	1	0	4
Chinese Taipei	1	0	0	4	0	1	0	1	7

Sheet B	1	2	3	4	5	6	7	8	Final
Ireland 🔨	2	2	0	1	0	0	0	0	5
Belgium	0	0	1	0	1	2	1	1	6

Sheet C	1	2	3	4	5	6	7	8	Final
Latvia 🔨	5	4	4	4	2	3	X	X	22
Kenya	0	0	0	0	0	0	X	X	0

Sheet E	1	2	3	4	5	6	7	8	Final
Slovakia	0	0	0	2	0	1	0	X	3
Poland 🔨	1	1	1	0	1	0	6	X	10

Sheet F	1	2	3	4	5	6	7	8	Final
Portugal 🔨	2	0	0	0	0	1	0	X	3
Turkey	0	6	1	1	1	0	4	X	13

=== Draw 6 ===
Saturday, October 3, 16:00

Sheet A	1	2	3	4	5	6	7	8	Final
Guyana	0	2	0	1	1	0	1	1	6
England 🔨	1	0	2	0	0	2	0	0	5

Sheet B	1	2	3	4	5	6	7	8	Final
Spain 🔨	0	4	4	2	0	2	X	X	12
Brazil	1	0	0	0	1	0	X	X	2

Sheet D	1	2	3	4	5	6	7	8	Final
Austria	2	1	1	0	0	2	0	1	7
Pakistan 🔨	0	0	0	1	2	0	2	0	5

Sheet E	1	2	3	4	5	6	7	8	9	Final
Slovenia 🔨	2	1	0	0	0	1	0	1	4	9
Ukraine	0	0	1	2	1	0	1	0	0	5

Sheet F	1	2	3	4	5	6	7	8	Final
India 🔨	0	2	0	0	0	3	1	0	6
Philippines	1	0	1	1	2	0	0	2	7

=== Draw 7 ===
Saturday, October 3, 19:30

Sheet A	1	2	3	4	5	6	7	8	Final
Latvia 🔨	4	2	2	3	0	3	X	X	14
Romania	0	0	0	0	1	0	X	X	1

Sheet B	1	2	3	4	5	6	7	8	Final
Poland 🔨	3	2	0	3	1	0	1	X	10
Nigeria	0	0	1	0	0	3	0	X	4

Sheet C	1	2	3	4	5	6	7	8	Final
United States 🔨	1	2	0	4	2	2	X	X	11
Hong Kong	0	0	1	0	0	0	X	X	1

Sheet D	1	2	3	4	5	6	7	8	Final
Turkey	0	0	0	2	0	1	0	X	3
France 🔨	3	2	2	0	2	0	3	X	12

Sheet E	1	2	3	4	5	6	7	8	Final
Belgium 🔨	0	1	0	1	0	1	0	X	3
Chinese Taipei	3	0	3	0	1	0	1	X	8

=== Draw 8 ===
Sunday, October 4, 9:00

Sheet A	1	2	3	4	5	6	7	8	Final
Austria	2	0	3	0	3	0	4	X	12
Philippines 🔨	0	1	0	3	0	1	0	X	5

Sheet B	1	2	3	4	5	6	7	8	Final
Ukraine 🔨	3	2	3	0	4	1	2	X	15
Kenya	0	0	0	3	0	0	0	X	3

Sheet C	1	2	3	4	5	6	7	8	Final
Pakistan 🔨	0	0	1	0	3	1	0	0	5
Slovakia	1	2	0	4	0	0	2	1	10

Sheet D	1	2	3	4	5	6	7	8	Final
Mexico	1	0	4	3	0	1	1	X	10
Portugal 🔨	0	2	0	0	2	0	0	X	4

=== Draw 9 ===
Sunday, October 4, 12:30

Sheet A	1	2	3	4	5	6	7	8	Final
Slovenia 🔨	0	1	0	0	2	0	1	X	4
Spain	2	0	1	1	0	4	0	X	8

Sheet B	1	2	3	4	5	6	7	8	Final
Belgium 🔨	2	0	2	0	0	1	0	6	11
Puerto Rico	0	2	0	3	1	0	2	0	8

Sheet C	1	2	3	4	5	6	7	8	Final
Nigeria	1	1	1	0	0	2	1	1	7
India 🔨	0	0	0	3	1	0	0	0	4

Sheet D	1	2	3	4	5	6	7	8	Final
Hong Kong	0	0	0	1	2	0	0	X	3
Poland 🔨	2	2	1	0	0	1	2	X	8

Sheet E	1	2	3	4	5	6	7	8	Final
Guyana 🔨	0	4	1	0	4	0	1	X	10
Romania	2	0	0	1	0	2	0	X	5

Sheet F	1	2	3	4	5	6	7	8	Final
England 🔨	0	4	2	1	0	0	3	X	10
Brazil	1	0	0	0	1	2	0	X	4

=== Draw 10 ===
Sunday, October 4, 16:00

Sheet A	1	2	3	4	5	6	7	8	Final
Turkey	0	0	1	0	2	0	0	X	3
Ireland 🔨	1	1	0	2	0	1	2	X	7

Sheet C	1	2	3	4	5	6	7	8	Final
France 🔨	2	0	2	1	2	1	X	X	8
Mexico	0	2	0	0	0	0	X	X	2

Sheet D	1	2	3	4	5	6	7	8	Final
Slovakia	0	0	3	0	0	1	X	X	4
Austria 🔨	4	3	0	1	3	0	X	X	11

Sheet E	1	2	3	4	5	6	7	8	Final
Philippines	0	0	0	1	0	1	X	X	2
Pakistan 🔨	2	2	2	0	1	0	X	X	7

Sheet F	1	2	3	4	5	6	7	8	Final
Chinese Taipei 🔨	2	0	2	0	3	0	0	X	7
Portugal	0	1	0	1	0	1	1	X	4

=== Draw 11 ===
Sunday, October 4, 19:30

Sheet A	1	2	3	4	5	6	7	8	Final
Kenya	0	0	1	0	0	0	X	X	1
Guyana 🔨	4	3	0	3	2	4	X	X	16

Sheet B	1	2	3	4	5	6	7	8	Final
England 🔨	1	0	1	1	0	3	0	X	6
Latvia	0	3	0	0	5	0	1	X	9

Sheet C	1	2	3	4	5	6	7	8	Final
Ukraine	0	0	1	2	0	1	0	X	4
Spain 🔨	4	1	0	0	2	0	2	X	9

Sheet D	1	2	3	4	5	6	7	8	Final
Romania 🔨	0	0	0	1	0	0	X	X	1
Slovenia	1	3	2	0	1	1	X	X	8

Sheet E	1	2	3	4	5	6	7	8	Final
Poland	0	2	0	0	0	0	X	X	2
United States 🔨	2	0	2	2	2	1	X	X	9

=== Draw 12 ===
Monday, October 5, 9:00

Sheet B	1	2	3	4	5	6	7	8	Final
Hong Kong	1	0	1	1	0	2	0	X	5
Austria 🔨	0	4	0	0	3	0	3	X	10

Sheet D	1	2	3	4	5	6	7	8	Final
Chinese Taipei	0	0	2	1	2	2	0	X	7
Turkey 🔨	2	1	0	0	0	0	2	X	5

Sheet E	1	2	3	4	5	6	7	8	Final
Portugal 🔨	3	2	1	1	1	0	1	X	9
Puerto Rico	0	0	0	0	0	1	0	X	1

Sheet F	1	2	3	4	5	6	7	8	Final
France 🔨	1	0	0	3	0	1	3	X	8
Ireland	0	2	1	0	2	0	0	X	5

=== Draw 13 ===
Monday, October 5, 12:30

Sheet A	1	2	3	4	5	6	7	8	Final
Spain	0	0	1	0	0	1	0	X	2
Latvia 🔨	4	2	0	1	2	0	5	X	14

Sheet B	1	2	3	4	5	6	7	8	Final
Philippines	1	0	0	0	0	3	0	1	5
Slovakia 🔨	0	2	1	2	1	0	1	0	7

Sheet C	1	2	3	4	5	6	7	8	Final
Kenya	0	0	0	1	0	0	X	X	1
Slovenia 🔨	2	2	3	0	4	5	X	X	16

Sheet D	1	2	3	4	5	6	7	8	Final
Poland 🔨	5	1	3	0	0	4	X	X	13
India	0	0	0	1	1	0	X	X	2

Sheet E	1	2	3	4	5	6	7	8	Final
Brazil	0	0	0	0	0	0	X	X	0
Guyana 🔨	5	2	3	1	1	1	X	X	13

Sheet F	1	2	3	4	5	6	7	8	Final
Nigeria	0	0	0	0	0	1	X	X	1
United States 🔨	4	3	3	5	1	0	X	X	16

=== Draw 14 ===
Monday, October 5, 16:00

Sheet A	1	2	3	4	5	6	7	8	Final
Belgium	1	2	0	0	0	0	0	0	3
Mexico 🔨	0	0	2	1	1	1	1	2	8

Sheet D	1	2	3	4	5	6	7	8	Final
England 🔨	4	0	0	0	0	0	1	X	5
Ukraine	0	3	2	1	2	1	0	X	9

Sheet E	1	2	3	4	5	6	7	8	Final
Chinese Taipei 🔨	0	0	0	0	0	1	X	X	1
France	1	2	1	4	2	0	X	X	10

Sheet F	1	2	3	4	5	6	7	8	Final
Pakistan 🔨	0	0	1	0	0	1	1	X	3
Hong Kong	2	1	0	2	1	0	0	X	6

=== Draw 15 ===
Monday, October 5, 19:30

Sheet A	1	2	3	4	5	6	7	8	Final
India	0	0	1	1	0	1	0	X	3
Slovakia 🔨	3	1	0	0	4	0	3	X	11

Sheet B	1	2	3	4	5	6	7	8	Final
Brazil 🔨	1	0	0	1	0	0	1	X	3
Romania	0	5	3	0	1	1	0	X	10

Sheet C	1	2	3	4	5	6	7	8	Final
Philippines	0	0	0	1	0	0	X	X	1
Poland 🔨	2	2	1	0	2	1	X	X	8

Sheet D	1	2	3	4	5	6	7	8	Final
Puerto Rico	0	0	0	0	0	0	1	X	1
Ireland 🔨	1	1	2	1	1	1	0	X	7

Sheet E	1	2	3	4	5	6	7	8	Final
United States 🔨	1	0	3	1	1	3	X	X	9
Austria	0	2	0	0	0	0	X	X	2

Sheet F	1	2	3	4	5	6	7	8	Final
Latvia 🔨	3	0	1	1	0	1	2	X	8
Slovenia	0	1	0	0	2	0	0	X	3

=== Draw 16 ===
Tuesday, October 6, 9:00

Sheet B	1	2	3	4	5	6	7	8	Final
Turkey 🔨	2	0	0	1	0	3	0	X	6
Mexico	0	1	2	0	2	0	4	X	9

Sheet C	1	2	3	4	5	6	7	8	Final
Spain 🔨	0	1	0	0	1	1	0	X	3
Guyana	1	0	5	1	0	0	3	X	10

Sheet D	1	2	3	4	5	6	7	8	Final
Portugal	0	1	0	0	0	4	0	0	5
Belgium 🔨	2	0	1	2	2	0	1	1	9

Sheet E	1	2	3	4	5	6	7	8	Final
England 🔨	6	2	2	1	3	0	X	X	14
Kenya	0	0	0	0	0	1	X	X	1

=== Draw 17 ===
Tuesday, October 6, 12:30

Sheet A	1	2	3	4	5	6	7	8	Final
Puerto Rico	0	0	0	0	0	0	X	X	0
France 🔨	2	2	2	2	4	1	X	X	13

Sheet B	1	2	3	4	5	6	7	8	Final
Pakistan	0	0	1	2	0	0	1	0	4
Poland 🔨	2	1	0	0	1	1	0	1	6

Sheet C	1	2	3	4	5	6	7	8	Final
Slovakia	0	0	0	3	0	0	X	X	3
United States 🔨	3	2	2	0	4	4	X	X	15

Sheet D	1	2	3	4	5	6	7	8	Final
Nigeria 🔨	1	0	1	0	1	1	0	3	7
Hong Kong	0	2	0	1	0	0	3	0	6

Sheet E	1	2	3	4	5	6	7	8	Final
Latvia 🔨	1	1	1	1	1	2	X	X	7
Brazil	0	0	0	0	0	0	X	X	0

Sheet F	1	2	3	4	5	6	7	8	Final
Ukraine 🔨	3	4	4	1	0	2	X	X	14
Romania	0	0	0	0	2	0	X	X	2

=== Draw 18 ===
Tuesday, October 6, 16:00

Sheet A	1	2	3	4	5	6	7	8	Final
Ireland 🔨	0	1	0	0	6	1	1	X	9
Portugal	1	0	1	1	0	0	0	X	3

Sheet B	1	2	3	4	5	6	7	8	Final
Slovenia	2	0	1	3	0	1	1	X	8
Guyana 🔨	0	1	0	0	2	0	0	X	3

Sheet C	1	2	3	4	5	6	7	8	Final
Turkey 🔨	1	0	3	0	3	2	X	X	9
Belgium	0	1	0	1	0	0	X	X	2

Sheet D	1	2	3	4	5	6	7	8	9	Final
Spain 🔨	1	1	0	1	0	1	0	1	0	5
England	0	0	1	0	3	0	1	0	1	6

Sheet F	1	2	3	4	5	6	7	8	Final
Austria 🔨	1	1	3	1	0	1	1	X	8
India	0	0	0	0	2	0	0	X	2

=== Draw 19 ===
Tuesday, October 6, 19:30

Sheet A	1	2	3	4	5	6	7	8	Final
Romania 🔨	4	3	1	2	1	3	X	X	14
Kenya	0	0	0	0	0	0	X	X	0

Sheet B	1	2	3	4	5	6	7	8	Final
Puerto Rico	0	2	0	0	0	0	1	X	3
Chinese Taipei 🔨	2	0	1	2	1	1	0	X	7

Sheet C	1	2	3	4	5	6	7	8	Final
Brazil 🔨	0	0	0	0	0	1	X	X	1
Ukraine	1	2	1	1	2	0	X	X	7

Sheet D	1	2	3	4	5	6	7	8	Final
United States 🔨	5	3	3	0	1	0	X	X	12
Philippines	0	0	0	1	0	1	X	X	2

Sheet E	1	2	3	4	5	6	7	8	Final
Pakistan 🔨	0	4	1	2	0	5	X	X	12
Nigeria	1	0	0	0	0	0	X	X	1

=== Draw 20 ===
Wednesday, October 7, 10:00

Sheet A	1	2	3	4	5	6	7	8	Final
Brazil	1	0	0	0	0	1	X	X	2
Slovenia 🔨	0	5	1	1	3	0	X	X	10

Sheet C	1	2	3	4	5	6	7	8	Final
Romania 🔨	0	0	1	0	0	0	3	X	4
England	1	1	0	4	1	1	0	X	8

Sheet D	1	2	3	4	5	6	7	8	Final
Ireland 🔨	4	0	1	1	0	0	0	0	6
Mexico	0	1	0	0	2	1	2	3	9

Sheet E	1	2	3	4	5	6	7	8	Final
Puerto Rico	0	2	0	0	0	0	X	X	2
Turkey 🔨	4	0	4	1	2	3	X	X	14

Sheet F	1	2	3	4	5	6	7	8	Final
Kenya	0	1	0	0	0	0	X	X	1
Spain 🔨	3	0	2	4	1	2	X	X	12

== Playoffs ==
Quarterfinals
1	United States	9
8	Mexico	2
4	Poland	7
5	Ukraine	4
3	France	15
6	Chinese Taipei	2
2	Latvia	8
7	Spain	6

Semifinals
1	United States	8
4	Poland	6
3	France	5
2	Latvia	8

Final
1	United States	8
2	Latvia	6
Third place
4	Poland	6
3	France	7

=== Quarterfinals ===
Wednesday, October 7, 16:00

Sheet B	1	2	3	4	5	6	7	8	Final
Poland 🔨	2	0	1	2	0	2	0	X	7
Ukraine	0	1	0	0	1	0	2	X	4

Sheet C	1	2	3	4	5	6	7	8	Final
United States 🔨	2	0	2	1	1	0	3	X	9
Mexico	0	1	0	0	0	1	0	X	2

Sheet D	1	2	3	4	5	6	7	8	Final
Latvia 🔨	1	0	4	0	0	3	0	0	8
Spain	0	1	0	1	1	0	1	2	6

Sheet E	1	2	3	4	5	6	7	8	Final
France 🔨	5	1	3	0	4	2	X	X	15
Chinese Taipei	0	0	0	2	0	0	X	X	2

=== Semifinals ===
Thursday, October 8, 10:00

Sheet B	1	2	3	4	5	6	7	8	9	Final
France	0	1	1	0	0	2	1	0	0	5
Latvia 🔨	1	0	0	1	1	0	0	2	3	8

Sheet E	1	2	3	4	5	6	7	8	Final
United States 🔨	1	2	1	0	1	0	0	3	8
Poland	0	0	0	1	0	4	1	0	6

=== Third Place Game ===
Thursday, October 8, 15:00

Sheet D	1	2	3	4	5	6	7	8	Final
Poland	1	1	0	1	0	2	1	0	6
France 🔨	0	0	1	0	4	0	0	2	7

=== Final ===
Thursday, October 8, 15:00

Sheet C	1	2	3	4	5	6	7	8	Final
United States	0	1	1	1	0	3	0	2	8
Latvia 🔨	1	0	0	0	4	0	1	0	6
