= Antoine Ménard, dit Lafontaine =

Canadian politician and building contractor

Antoine Ménard, dit Lafontaine (April 2, 1744 – April 17, 1825) was a building contractor and political figure in Lower Canada.

He was born in Boucherville in 1744. Ménard was elected to the Legislative Assembly of Lower Canada for Kent in 1796 and was re-elected in 1800.

He died in Boucherville in 1825.

His grandson, Louis-Hippolyte Lafontaine, was an important figure in the development of responsible government in the province.
