= Marien Tailhandier =

Marien Tailhandier, (b. 1665 – d. 1738 or 1739), was a French soldier, surgeon and judge in New France

Born in Clermont, France, Tailhandier was the son of Antoine Tailhander, an attorney in the Auvergne region of France.

Marien Tailhandier arrived in Quebec in 1685. On 8 January 1688, he married Madeline Baudry in Boucherville, Quebec. The couple would eventually have two daughters. At that time of his marriage, Tailhandier was a surgeon and soldier in the company of M. Daneau de Muy. That same year, he became a notary.

In 1699, Tailhandier was appointed as notary, judge and clerk of the seigneurial court in Boucherville. During this period, he continued practicing surgery. In 1702, Tailhandier received a commission as a royal notary and a clerk of court.

Tailhandier's last official act was recorded in 1730, and he was resported as deceased sometime in 1738 or 1739.
