= Sabrevois River =

Location
- Countries: Canada
- Province: Quebec
- Administrative region: Montérégie

Physical characteristics
- Source: Bras des Terres Jaunes (creek)
  - location: Boucherville
  - coordinates: 45.62025°N 73.39876°W
  - elevation: 23 m (75 ft)
- Mouth: Saint Lawrence River
  - location: Boucherville
  - coordinates: 45.59917°N 73.45944°W
  - elevation: 7 m (23 ft)
- Length: 6.5 km (4.0 mi)

Basin features
- Tributaries
  - right: Bras des terres Noires (creek)

The Sabrevois River (French: rivière Sabrevois, pronounced [ʁivjɛʁ sabʁəvwa]) is a tributary of the south shore of the St. Lawrence River, flowing in the city of Boucherville, in the administrative region of Montérégie, southwest of province of Quebec, in Canada.

The upper part of this watercourse crosses the agricultural zone between autoroute 30 and route 132. This upper part is mainly accessible via the chemin du rang Lustucru. The lower part passes the urban area of Boucherville by cutting De Montbrun street, De Montarville boulevard and route 132.

The river surface is generally frozen from mid-December to the end of March. Safe circulation on the ice is generally done from the end of December to the beginning of March. The water level of the river varies with the seasons and the precipitation.

== Geography ==
The main hydrographic slopes neighboring the Sabrevois river are:

- north side: Rivière aux Pins (Boucherville), Saint-Charles River, Pays Brûlé stream;
- east side: La Grande Décharge, Narbonne stream;
- South side:
- west side: St. Lawrence River.

The Sabrevois river begins next to the railway, in an agricultural zone in the northeast part of the territory of the town of Boucherville. It is mainly fed by the stream "Bras des Terres Jaunes".

The Sabrevois river flows on 6.5 kilometres (4.0 mi), with a drop of 16 metres (52 ft), according to the following segments:

- 2.8 kilometres (1.7 mi) to the southwest in the agricultural zone, by collecting the Bras des Terres Noires stream (coming from the north), to De Montbrun street;
- 2.0 kilometres (1.2 mi) to the southwest in an urban area, passing in Parc de Mortagne, forming a hook west, passing in the Sabrevois Park, and passing on North side of Anne-Marie-Lemay Park, to De Montarville street;
- 1.7 kilometres (1.1 mi) to the west passing in Bois-de-Brouage Park, crossing route 132 and passing on South side of Parc De La Broquerie, to its mouth.

The mouth of the Pins River is located on the southeast shore of the St. Lawrence River, opposite the Sainte-Marguerite Island, either:

- 3.9 kilometres (2.4 mi) east of the shore of Pointe-aux-Trembles;
- 5.5 kilometres (3.4 mi) upstream of the mouth of the Rivière aux Pins (Boucherville);
- 2.7 kilometres (1.7 mi) north of the Louis-Hippolyte Lafontaine Bridge–Tunnel.

== Toponymy ==
This toponym evokes the memory of Jacques-Charles de Sabrevois (Gamarde-les-Bains, France, around 1667 - Montreal, 1727), officer in the French troops, arrived in New France in 1685. Sabrevois was commander in Detroit and in fort de Chambly under the French regime. He married Jeanne Boucher, daughter of Pierre Boucher, lord of Boucherville.

The toponym "Sabrevois river" was formalized on December 18, 1986, at the Commission de toponymie du Québec.

== See also ==
- List of rivers of Quebec
