= 2027 World Mixed Doubles Curling Championship =

2027 edition of the World Mixed Doubles Curling Championship

- Host city: Lohja, Finland
- Arena: Kisakallio Sports Institute
- Dates: January 4–10

The 2027 World Mixed Doubles Curling Championship will be held from January 4 to 10 at the Kisakallio Sports Institute in Lohja, Finland.

As part of the 2026–2030 Olympic cycle restructuring, the event was moved from the end of the season in April to the start of January. The format went unchanged, however, with the 2026 World Mixed Doubles Qualification Event held in October 2026 to qualify the final three teams for the championship.

== Qualification ==
The following nations qualified to participate in the 2027 World Mixed Doubles Curling Championship:

Means of Qualification	Vacancies	Qualified
Host Nation	1	Finland
2026 World Mixed Doubles Curling Championship	16	Australia; Sweden; Canada; Italy; Japan; Scotland; Estonia; Switzerland; Norway; South Korea; Czech Republic; China; Netherlands; Germany; Hungary; New Zealand
2026 World Mixed Doubles Qualification Event	3	United States; Latvia; France
TOTAL	20	

== Teams ==
The teams are listed as follows:

Australia	Canada	China	Czech Republic
Female: Jessica Wytrychowski; Male: Dean Hewitt	Female: Serena Gray-Withers; Male: Victor Pietrangelo	Female: Male:	Female: Julie Zelingrová; Male: Vít Chabičovský
Estonia	Finland	France	Germany
Female: Karoliine Kaare; Male: Harri Lill	Female: Male:	Female: Male:	Female: Vera Tiuliakova; Male: Sixten Totzek
Hungary	Italy	Japan	Latvia
Female: Male:	Female: Male:	Female: Tori Koana; Male: Go Aoki	Female: Katrīna Gaidule; Male: Roberts Reinis Buncis
Netherlands	New Zealand	Norway	Scotland
Female: Lisenka Bomas; Male: Wouter Gösgens	Female: Jessica Michels; Male: Ben Smith	Female: Male:	Female: Vicky Drummond; Male: Euan Kyle
South Korea	Sweden	Switzerland	United States
Female: Kang Bo-bae; Male: Kim Hak-jun	Female: Therese Westman; Male: Robin Ahlberg	Female: Male:	Female: Cory Thiesse; Male: Korey Dropkin

== Round robin standings ==
Key
Teams to Playoffs
Teams to Relegation Playoff
Teams relegated to Qualification Event

Group A	Athletes	W	L	W–L	PF	PA	EW	EL	BE	SE	S%	DSC
Australia	Jessica Wytrychowski / Dean Hewitt	0	0	–	0	0	0	0	0	0	%	0.00
Canada	Serena Gray-Withers / Victor Pietrangelo	0	0	–	0	0	0	0	0	0	%	0.00
China		0	0	–	0	0	0	0	0	0	%	0.00
Czech Republic	Julie Zelingrová / Vít Chabičovský	0	0	–	0	0	0	0	0	0	%	0.00
Finland		0	0	–	0	0	0	0	0	0	%	0.00
France		0	0	–	0	0	0	0	0	0	%	0.00
New Zealand	Jessica Michels / Ben Smith	0	0	–	0	0	0	0	0	0	%	0.00
Norway		0	0	–	0	0	0	0	0	0	%	0.00
Sweden	Therese Westman / Robin Ahlberg	0	0	–	0	0	0	0	0	0	%	0.00
Switzerland		0	0	–	0	0	0	0	0	0	%	0.00

Group B	Athletes	W	L	W–L	PF	PA	EW	EL	BE	SE	S%	DSC
Estonia	Karoliine Kaare / Harri Lill	0	0	–	0	0	0	0	0	0	%	0.00
Germany	Vera Tiuliakova / Sixten Totzek	0	0	–	0	0	0	0	0	0	%	0.00
Hungary		0	0	–	0	0	0	0	0	0	%	0.00
Italy		0	0	–	0	0	0	0	0	0	%	0.00
Japan	Tori Koana / Go Aoki	0	0	–	0	0	0	0	0	0	%	0.00
Latvia	Katrīna Gaidule / Roberts Reinis Buncis	0	0	–	0	0	0	0	0	0	%	0.00
Netherlands	Lisenka Bomas / Wouter Gösgens	0	0	–	0	0	0	0	0	0	%	0.00
Scotland	Vicky Drummond / Euan Kyle	0	0	–	0	0	0	0	0	0	%	0.00
South Korea	Kang Bo-bae / Kim Hak-jun	0	0	–	0	0	0	0	0	0	%	0.00
United States	Cory Thiesse / Korey Dropkin	0	0	–	0	0	0	0	0	0	%	0.00

Group A Round Robin Summary Table
Pos.	Country	Australia	Canada	China	Czech Republic	Finland	France	New Zealand	Norway	Sweden	Switzerland	Record
1	Australia	—	D9	D5	D3	D17	D11	D15	D13	D1	D7	0–0
1	Canada	D9	—	D11	D7	D15	D17	D1	D5	D3	D13	0–0
1	China	D5	D11	—	D1	D3	D9	D17	D7	D13	D15	0–0
1	Czech Republic	D3	D7	D1	—	D5	D13	D9	D15	D11	D17	0–0
1	Finland	D17	D15	D3	D5	—	D1	D13	D9	D7	D11	0–0
1	France	D11	D17	D9	D13	D1	—	D7	D3	D15	D5	0–0
1	New Zealand	D15	D1	D17	D9	D13	D7	—	D11	D5	D3	0–0
1	Norway	D13	D5	D7	D15	D9	D3	D11	—	D17	D1	0–0
1	Sweden	D1	D3	D13	D11	D7	D15	D5	D17	—	D9	0–0
1	Switzerland	D7	D13	D15	D17	D11	D5	D3	D1	D9	—	0–0

Group B Round Robin Summary Table
Pos.	Country	Estonia	Germany	Hungary	Italy	Japan	Latvia	Netherlands	Scotland	South Korea	United States	Record
1	Estonia	—	D4	D8	D18	D12	D14	D6	D10	D16	D2	0–0
1	Germany	D4	—	D10	D8	D2	D12	D18	D16	D14	D6	0–0
1	Hungary	D8	D10	—	D14	D4	D18	D16	D2	D6	D12	0–0
1	Italy	D18	D8	D14	—	D10	D6	D12	D4	D2	D16	0–0
1	Japan	D12	D2	D4	D10	—	D16	D8	D6	D18	D14	0–0
1	Latvia	D14	D12	D18	D6	D16	—	D2	D8	D4	D10	0–0
1	Netherlands	D6	D18	D16	D12	D8	D2	—	D14	D10	D4	0–0
1	Scotland	D10	D16	D2	D4	D6	D8	D14	—	D12	D18	0–0
1	South Korea	D16	D14	D6	D2	D18	D4	D10	D12	—	D8	0–0
1	United States	D2	D6	D12	D16	D14	D10	D4	D18	D8	—	0–0

== Round robin results ==
All draw times are listed in Eastern European Time (UTC+02:00).

=== Draw 1 ===
Monday, January 4, 4:30 pm

Sheet A	1	2	3	4	5	6	7	8	Final
France									0
Finland									0

Sheet B	1	2	3	4	5	6	7	8	Final
Sweden (Westman / Ahlberg)									0
Australia (Wytrychowski / Hewitt)									0

Sheet C	1	2	3	4	5	6	7	8	Final
Canada (Gray-Withers / Pietrangelo)									0
New Zealand (Michels / Smith)									0

Sheet D	1	2	3	4	5	6	7	8	Final
Czech Republic (Zelingrová / Chabičovský)									0
China									0

Sheet E	1	2	3	4	5	6	7	8	Final
Norway									0
Switzerland									0

=== Draw 2 ===
Monday, January 4, 8:00 pm

Sheet A	1	2	3	4	5	6	7	8	Final
Latvia (Gaidule / Buncis)									0
Netherlands (Bomas / Gösgens)									0

Sheet B	1	2	3	4	5	6	7	8	Final
Japan (Koana / Aoki)									0
Germany (Tiuliakova / Totzek)									0

Sheet C	1	2	3	4	5	6	7	8	Final
Hungary									0
Scotland (Drummond / Kyle)									0

Sheet D	1	2	3	4	5	6	7	8	Final
Estonia (Kaare / Lill)									0
United States (Thiesse / Dropkin)									0

Sheet E	1	2	3	4	5	6	7	8	Final
South Korea (Kang / Kim)									0
Italy									0

=== Draw 3 ===
Tuesday, January 5, 9:00 am

Sheet A	1	2	3	4	5	6	7	8	Final
Australia (Wytrychowski / Hewitt)									0
Czech Republic (Zelingrová / Chabičovský)									0

Sheet B	1	2	3	4	5	6	7	8	Final
Finland									0
China									0

Sheet C	1	2	3	4	5	6	7	8	Final
Norway									0
France									0

Sheet D	1	2	3	4	5	6	7	8	Final
Switzerland									0
New Zealand (Michels / Smith)									0

Sheet E	1	2	3	4	5	6	7	8	Final
Sweden (Westman / Ahlberg)									0
Canada (Gray-Withers / Pietrangelo)									0

=== Draw 4 ===
Tuesday, January 5, 12:30 pm

Sheet A	1	2	3	4	5	6	7	8	Final
Germany (Tiuliakova / Totzek)									0
Estonia (Kaare / Lill)									0

Sheet B	1	2	3	4	5	6	7	8	Final
Netherlands (Bomas / Gösgens)									0
United States (Thiesse / Dropkin)									0

Sheet C	1	2	3	4	5	6	7	8	Final
South Korea (Kang / Kim)									0
Latvia (Gaidule / Buncis)									0

Sheet D	1	2	3	4	5	6	7	8	Final
Italy									0
Scotland (Drummond / Kyle)									0

Sheet E	1	2	3	4	5	6	7	8	Final
Japan (Koana / Aoki)									0
Hungary									0

=== Draw 5 ===
Tuesday, January 5, 4:00 pm

Sheet A	1	2	3	4	5	6	7	8	Final
New Zealand (Michels / Smith)									0
Sweden (Westman / Ahlberg)									0

Sheet B	1	2	3	4	5	6	7	8	Final
France									0
Switzerland									0

Sheet C	1	2	3	4	5	6	7	8	Final
Finland									0
Czech Republic (Zelingrová / Chabičovský)									0

Sheet D	1	2	3	4	5	6	7	8	Final
Canada (Gray-Withers / Pietrangelo)									0
Norway									0

Sheet E	1	2	3	4	5	6	7	8	Final
Australia (Wytrychowski / Hewitt)									0
China									0

=== Draw 6 ===
Tuesday, January 5, 7:30 pm

Sheet A	1	2	3	4	5	6	7	8	Final
Scotland (Drummond / Kyle)									0
Japan (Koana / Aoki)									0

Sheet B	1	2	3	4	5	6	7	8	Final
Latvia (Gaidule / Buncis)									0
Italy									0

Sheet C	1	2	3	4	5	6	7	8	Final
Netherlands (Bomas / Gösgens)									0
Estonia (Kaare / Lill)									0

Sheet D	1	2	3	4	5	6	7	8	Final
Hungary									0
South Korea (Kang / Kim)									0

Sheet E	1	2	3	4	5	6	7	8	Final
Germany (Tiuliakova / Totzek)									0
United States (Thiesse / Dropkin)									0

=== Draw 7 ===
Wednesday, January 6, 10:00 am

Sheet A	1	2	3	4	5	6	7	8	Final
China									0
Norway									0

Sheet B	1	2	3	4	5	6	7	8	Final
Canada (Gray-Withers / Pietrangelo)									0
Czech Republic (Zelingrová / Chabičovský)									0

Sheet C	1	2	3	4	5	6	7	8	Final
Switzerland									0
Australia (Wytrychowski / Hewitt)									0

Sheet D	1	2	3	4	5	6	7	8	Final
New Zealand (Michels / Smith)									0
France									0

Sheet E	1	2	3	4	5	6	7	8	Final
Finland									0
Sweden (Westman / Ahlberg)									0

=== Draw 8 ===
Wednesday, January 6, 2:00 pm

Sheet A	1	2	3	4	5	6	7	8	Final
United States (Thiesse / Dropkin)									0
South Korea (Kang / Kim)									0

Sheet B	1	2	3	4	5	6	7	8	Final
Hungary									0
Estonia (Kaare / Lill)									0

Sheet C	1	2	3	4	5	6	7	8	Final
Italy									0
Germany (Tiuliakova / Totzek)									0

Sheet D	1	2	3	4	5	6	7	8	Final
Scotland (Drummond / Kyle)									0
Latvia (Gaidule / Buncis)									0

Sheet E	1	2	3	4	5	6	7	8	Final
Netherlands (Bomas / Gösgens)									0
Japan (Koana / Aoki)									0

=== Draw 9 ===
Wednesday, January 6, 6:00 pm

Sheet A	1	2	3	4	5	6	7	8	Final
Canada (Gray-Withers / Pietrangelo)									0
Australia (Wytrychowski / Hewitt)									0

Sheet B	1	2	3	4	5	6	7	8	Final
Norway									0
Finland									0

Sheet C	1	2	3	4	5	6	7	8	Final
France									0
China									0

Sheet D	1	2	3	4	5	6	7	8	Final
Sweden (Westman / Ahlberg)									0
Switzerland									0

Sheet E	1	2	3	4	5	6	7	8	Final
Czech Republic (Zelingrová / Chabičovský)									0
New Zealand (Michels / Smith)									0

=== Draw 10 ===
Thursday, January 7, 9:00 am

Sheet A	1	2	3	4	5	6	7	8	Final
Hungary									0
Germany (Tiuliakova / Totzek)									0

Sheet B	1	2	3	4	5	6	7	8	Final
South Korea (Kang / Kim)									0
Netherlands (Bomas / Gösgens)									0

Sheet C	1	2	3	4	5	6	7	8	Final
Latvia (Gaidule / Buncis)									0
United States (Thiesse / Dropkin)									0

Sheet D	1	2	3	4	5	6	7	8	Final
Japan (Koana / Aoki)									0
Italy									0

Sheet E	1	2	3	4	5	6	7	8	Final
Estonia (Kaare / Lill)									0
Scotland (Drummond / Kyle)									0

=== Draw 11 ===
Thursday, January 7, 12:30 pm

Sheet A	1	2	3	4	5	6	7	8	Final
Norway									0
New Zealand (Michels / Smith)									0

Sheet B	1	2	3	4	5	6	7	8	Final
Australia (Wytrychowski / Hewitt)									0
France									0

Sheet C	1	2	3	4	5	6	7	8	Final
Czech Republic (Zelingrová / Chabičovský)									0
Sweden (Westman / Ahlberg)									0

Sheet D	1	2	3	4	5	6	7	8	Final
China									0
Canada (Gray-Withers / Pietrangelo)									0

Sheet E	1	2	3	4	5	6	7	8	Final
Switzerland									0
Finland									0

=== Draw 12 ===
Thursday, January 7, 4:00 pm

Sheet A	1	2	3	4	5	6	7	8	Final
South Korea (Kang / Kim)									0
Scotland (Drummond / Kyle)									0

Sheet B	1	2	3	4	5	6	7	8	Final
Germany (Tiuliakova / Totzek)									0
Latvia (Gaidule / Buncis)									0

Sheet C	1	2	3	4	5	6	7	8	Final
Estonia (Kaare / Lill)									0
Japan (Koana / Aoki)									0

Sheet D	1	2	3	4	5	6	7	8	Final
United States (Thiesse / Dropkin)									0
Hungary									0

Sheet E	1	2	3	4	5	6	7	8	Final
Italy									0
Netherlands (Bomas / Gösgens)									0

=== Draw 13 ===
Thursday, January 7, 7:30 pm

Sheet A	1	2	3	4	5	6	7	8	Final
Sweden (Westman / Ahlberg)									0
China									0

Sheet B	1	2	3	4	5	6	7	8	Final
Switzerland									0
Canada (Gray-Withers / Pietrangelo)									0

Sheet C	1	2	3	4	5	6	7	8	Final
New Zealand (Michels / Smith)									0
Finland									0

Sheet D	1	2	3	4	5	6	7	8	Final
Norway									0
Australia (Wytrychowski / Hewitt)									0

Sheet E	1	2	3	4	5	6	7	8	Final
France									0
Czech Republic (Zelingrová / Chabičovský)									0

=== Draw 14 ===
Friday, January 8, 10:00 am

Sheet A	1	2	3	4	5	6	7	8	Final
Japan (Koana / Aoki)									0
United States (Thiesse / Dropkin)									0

Sheet B	1	2	3	4	5	6	7	8	Final
Italy									0
Hungary									0

Sheet C	1	2	3	4	5	6	7	8	Final
Scotland (Drummond / Kyle)									0
Netherlands (Bomas / Gösgens)									0

Sheet D	1	2	3	4	5	6	7	8	Final
South Korea (Kang / Kim)									0
Germany (Tiuliakova / Totzek)									0

Sheet E	1	2	3	4	5	6	7	8	Final
Latvia (Gaidule / Buncis)									0
Estonia (Kaare / Lill)									0

=== Draw 15 ===
Friday, January 8, 2:00 pm

Sheet A	1	2	3	4	5	6	7	8	Final
Finland									0
Canada (Gray-Withers / Pietrangelo)									0

Sheet B	1	2	3	4	5	6	7	8	Final
Czech Republic (Zelingrová / Chabičovský)									0
Norway									0

Sheet C	1	2	3	4	5	6	7	8	Final
China									0
Switzerland									0

Sheet D	1	2	3	4	5	6	7	8	Final
France									0
Sweden (Westman / Ahlberg)									0

Sheet E	1	2	3	4	5	6	7	8	Final
New Zealand (Michels / Smith)									0
Australia (Wytrychowski / Hewitt)									0

=== Draw 16 ===
Friday, January 8, 6:00 pm

Sheet A	1	2	3	4	5	6	7	8	Final
Netherlands (Bomas / Gösgens)									0
Hungary									0

Sheet B	1	2	3	4	5	6	7	8	Final
Estonia (Kaare / Lill)									0
South Korea (Kang / Kim)									0

Sheet C	1	2	3	4	5	6	7	8	Final
United States (Thiesse / Dropkin)									0
Italy									0

Sheet D	1	2	3	4	5	6	7	8	Final
Latvia (Gaidule / Buncis)									0
Japan (Koana / Aoki)									0

Sheet E	1	2	3	4	5	6	7	8	Final
Scotland (Drummond / Kyle)									0
Germany (Tiuliakova / Totzek)									0

=== Draw 17 ===
Saturday, January 9, 9:00 am

Sheet A	1	2	3	4	5	6	7	8	Final
Czech Republic (Zelingrová / Chabičovský)									0
Switzerland									0

Sheet B	1	2	3	4	5	6	7	8	Final
China									0
New Zealand (Michels / Smith)									0

Sheet C	1	2	3	4	5	6	7	8	Final
Sweden (Westman / Ahlberg)									0
Norway									0

Sheet D	1	2	3	4	5	6	7	8	Final
Australia (Wytrychowski / Hewitt)									0
Finland									0

Sheet E	1	2	3	4	5	6	7	8	Final
Canada (Gray-Withers / Pietrangelo)									0
France									0

=== Draw 18 ===
Saturday, January 9, 12:30 pm

Sheet A	1	2	3	4	5	6	7	8	Final
Estonia (Kaare / Lill)									0
Italy									0

Sheet B	1	2	3	4	5	6	7	8	Final
United States (Thiesse / Dropkin)									0
Scotland (Drummond / Kyle)									0

Sheet C	1	2	3	4	5	6	7	8	Final
Japan (Koana / Aoki)									0
South Korea (Kang / Kim)									0

Sheet D	1	2	3	4	5	6	7	8	Final
Germany (Tiuliakova / Totzek)									0
Netherlands (Bomas / Gösgens)									0

Sheet E	1	2	3	4	5	6	7	8	Final
Hungary									0
Latvia (Gaidule / Buncis)									0

== Relegation playoff ==
Saturday, January 9, 7:00 pm

Team	1	2	3	4	5	6	7	8	Final
									0
									0

Player percentages
Total	Total

Team	1	2	3	4	5	6	7	8	Final
									0
									0

Player percentages
Total	Total

== Playoffs ==
Qualification games
B2
A3
A2
B3

Semifinals
A1
B1

Final
Bronze medal game

=== Qualification Games ===
Saturday, January 9, 7:00 pm

Team	1	2	3	4	5	6	7	8	Final
									0
									0

Player percentages
Total	Total

Team	1	2	3	4	5	6	7	8	Final
									0
									0

Player percentages
Total	Total

=== Semifinals ===
Sunday, January 10, 9:00 am

Team	1	2	3	4	5	6	7	8	Final
									0
									0

Player percentages
Total	Total

Team	1	2	3	4	5	6	7	8	Final
									0
									0

Player percentages
Total	Total

=== Bronze medal game ===
Sunday, January 10, 3:00 pm

Team	1	2	3	4	5	6	7	8	Final
									0
									0

Player percentages
Total	Total

=== Final ===
Sunday, January 10, 3:00 pm

Team	1	2	3	4	5	6	7	8	Final
									0
									0

Player percentages
Total	Total

== Final standings ==
Key
Teams relegated to 2027 World Mixed Doubles Qualification Event

Place	Team
1st place, gold medalist(s)	
2nd place, silver medalist(s)	
3rd place, bronze medalist(s)	
4	
5	
6	
7	
8	
9	
10	
11	
12	
13	
14	
15	
16	
17	
18	
19	
20	
