= Boucherville =

- City
- Ville de Boucherville
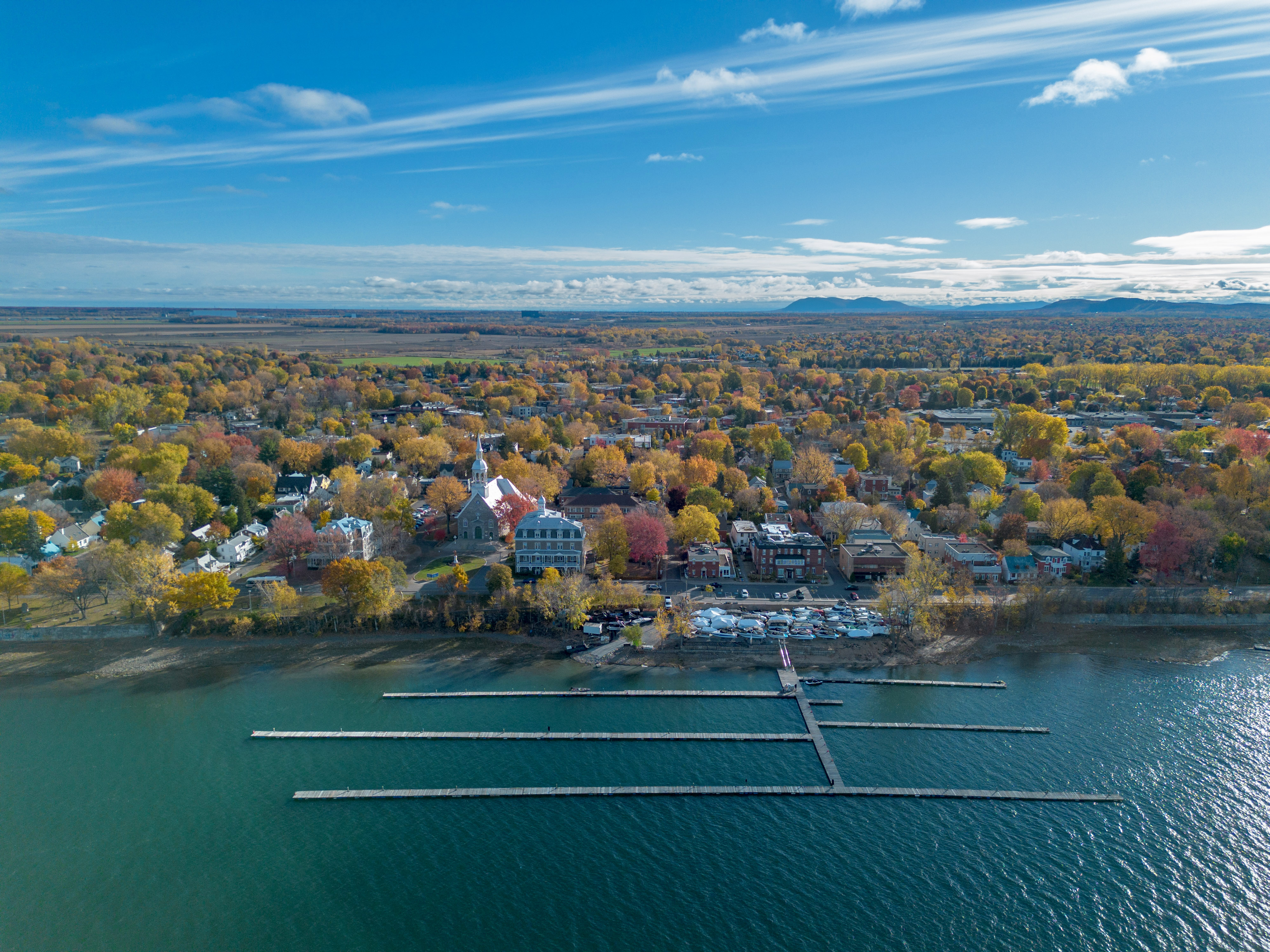
- Boucherville in 2025

- Seal Coat of arms
- Motto: Nature, patrimoine et art de vivre (French for "Nature, heritage and the art of life")
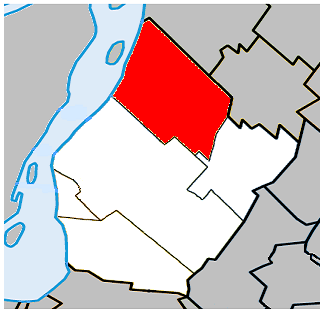
- Location within Urban Agglomeration of Longueuil.

- Location in southern Quebec.
- Coordinates: 45°36′N 73°27′W
- Country: Canada
- Province: Quebec
- Region: Montérégie
- RCM: None
- Agglomeration: Longueuil
- Settled: 1667
- Constituted: January 1, 2006

Government
  - Mayor: Jean Martel
  - Federal riding: Pierre-Boucher—Les Patriotes—Verchères
  - Prov. riding: Montarville

Area
  - Total: 81.10 km^{2} (31.31 sq mi)
  - Land: 71.02 km^{2} (27.42 sq mi)

Population (2021)
  - Total: 41,743
  - Density: 587.8/km^{2} (1,522/sq mi)
  - Dwellings: 17,733
- Time zone: UTC−05:00 (EST)
  - Summer (DST): UTC−04:00 (EDT)
- Postal code(s): J4B
- Area codes: 450 and 579
- Highways A-20 (TCH) A-30: R-132
- Website: www.boucherville.ca

Boucherville (French pronunciation: [buʃɛʁvil]) is a city in the Montérégie region in Quebec, Canada. It is a suburb of Montreal on the south shore of the Saint Lawrence River.

Boucherville is part of both the urban agglomeration of Longueuil and the Montreal Metropolitan Community regional government.

== History ==
=== Early history ===
Boucherville was founded as a seigneurial parish in 1667 by Pierre Boucher, for whom the city was later named. Pierre Boucher came from Mortagne-au-Perche, Normandy, France. After having lived in Quebec City and Trois-Rivières, Boucher moved to the Percées Islands by the southern shores of Saint Lawrence River, where he founded Boucherville.

The first Catholic church in the village of Boucherville was built in 1670. This church, made of wood, was eventually replaced in 1712 by a building made of brick. It was replaced in 1801 by the current Sainte-Famille Church.

Several families left Boucherville in the 18th century to found the communities of Sainte-Julie and Saint-Bruno-de-Montarville.

=== 1843 Fire and its aftermath ===
In July 1843 fire destroyed much of the village. Sparks blowing from a steamer ignited a wooden building owned by Mr. Weilbrenner (lot 112). The fire spread and soon most of the village was on fire. In the end, the church, the chapel, two schools, 51 homes, pastures, and 92 other buildings were destroyed.

The village was progressively rebuilt. A new church was built on the site of the old one over the course of the following two years. Parts of the walls and front were reused. A stone school was built in 1851 at the intersection of Notre-Dame and Louis-Hippolyte-Lafontaine streets.

=== Evolution in the late 19th and early 20th centuries ===
The municipality of the parish Sainte-Famille de Boucherville was established in 1845. This large territory included the village of Boucherville. In 1856, Sainte-Famille de Boucherville was divided into two separate municipalities: the parish Sainte-Famille de Boucherville and the village of Boucherville.

In 1854, seigneurial tenure was abolished. Pierre-Amable Boucher de Boucherville, last seigneur of Boucherville, died three years later.

The village Boucherville was to become an important vacation resort by the end of the 19th century and early 20th century. People from Montreal could access the village by train or ferry.

Boucherville experienced significant growth after World War II. This expansion was confirmed by the construction of the Louis-Hippolyte Lafontaine Bridge-Tunnel.

The parish Sainte-Famille de Boucherville ceded portions of its territory to Saint-Hubert in 1877, to Saint-Bruno-de-Montarville in 1950 and to the village of Boucherville in 1956.

=== Post-war to today ===
The village of Boucherville gained the status of city in 1957.

In 1963, the city of Boucherville merged with the Sainte-Famille de Boucherville parish. This brought Boucherville to its current city limits.

Boucherville opened a new 'civic centre', including an indoor and outdoor pool, municipal offices and indoor arena in 1966. The centre was later renamed in memory of the murdered cabinet minister Pierre Laporte. In August 2015, the Centre was closed as part of a three-year, $27 million refurbishment project. The shell of the old building will be blended into the new facility. Some of the equipment, such as the skating rink boards and glass will be reused in the Gilles-Chabot arena.

Boucherville was heavily affected by the January 1998 North American ice storm. Due to the loss of power, a Canadian National Railway M420W was intentionally derailed and brought to the city hall to serve as an emergency generator.

As part of the 2000–2006 municipal reorganization in Quebec, Boucherville ceased to exist as an independent city on January 1, 2002 and became a borough of Longueuil. However, after a 2004 referendum, it de-merged and was reconstituted as an independent city on January 1, 2006. However, it remains part of the urban agglomeration of Longueuil.

Today, Boucherville is home to more than 40,000 inhabitants and a large industrial park.

Founder Pierre Boucher is commemorated by a museum in his name at the Séminaire Saint-Joseph and a statue erected at the National Assembly of Quebec, in addition to a monument on the Boucherville's waterfront.

== Geography ==
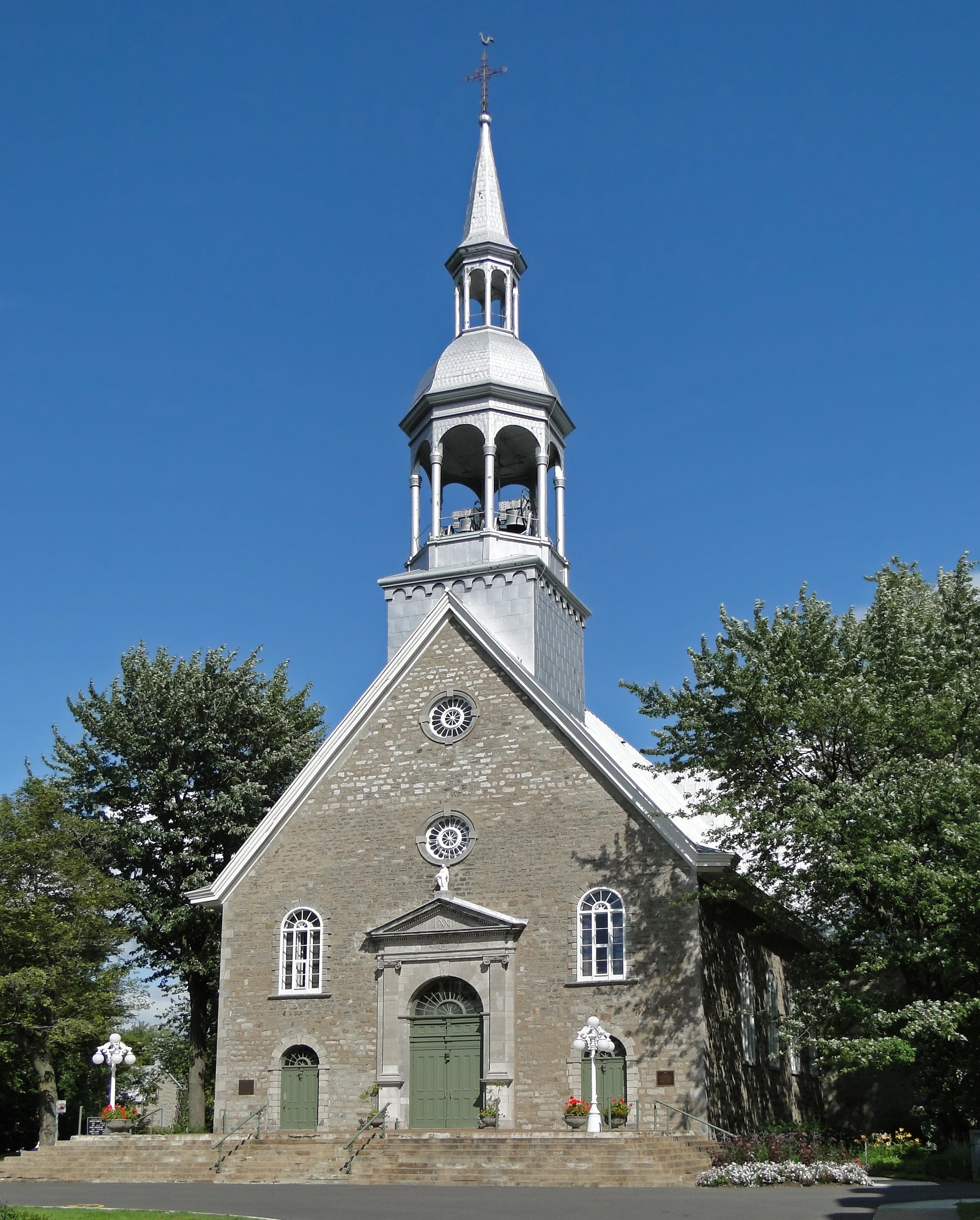
Sainte-Famille Church

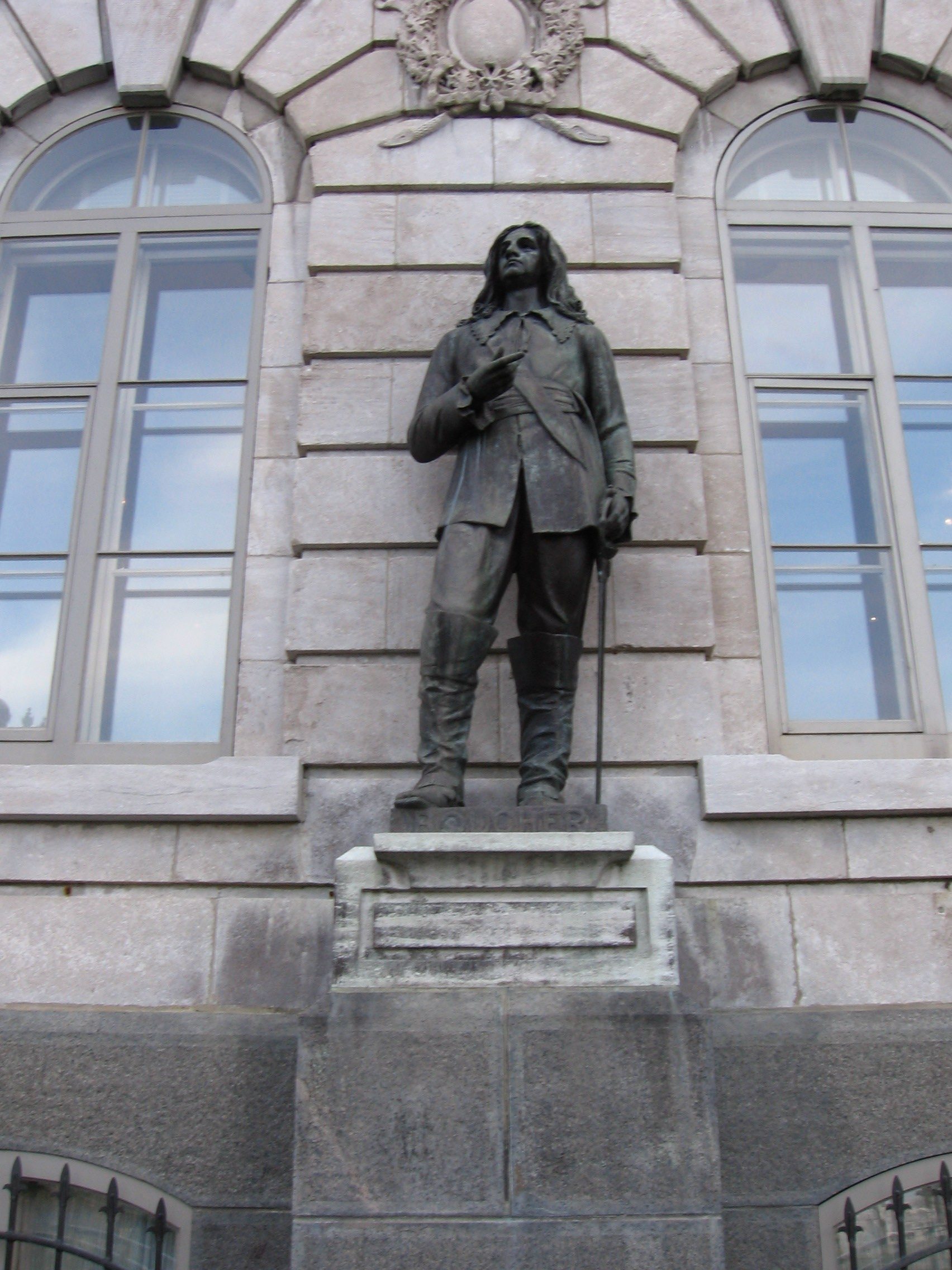
Statue of Pierre Boucher at the National Assembly

The Harmonie neighbourhood is located between the boulevards de Mortagne, de Montarville, de Montbrun and de Normandie. Its development is fairly recent and is essentially residential with many upscale houses. Many park and green spaces decorate the neighbourhood. The multifunctional centre of Boucherville is also there.

The Quartier des villes et provinces de France neighbourhood is located between the streets de Normandie, Gay-Lussac, Ampère and boulevard Montarville. All the streets and parks in this neighbourhood are named after provinces of France. The neighbourhood is essentially composed of separate or semi-detached houses.

Old Boucherville is the original section of the city that contains the former village and Sainte-Famille Church. The neighbourhood is located between Saint-Lawrence River, the boulevards du Fort Saint-Louis, de Montarville et de Montbrun. Many of the buildings there are officially classified as historic monuments.

The industrial section of Boucherville covers the western part of the city; from Autoroute 20 all the way to Longueuil. This section is divided into 3 industrial parks. Although these parks were inaugurated in the 1960s, it was during the last two decades that their expansion has been the greatest. In the early 1980s, they were little more 100 companies and 6 000 jobs scattered in the industrial section. Today, they are 600 companies and 15 000 jobs in various sectors. Additionally, the industrial section is home to 2 research centres. The Boisé du Tremblay Wildlife Reserve is located within this section.

The Seigneurie is a residential neighbourhood. It is located south of Fort Saint-Louis boulevard, north of de Mortagne boulevard, to the west of de Brouage street and east of the Industriel boulevard. The neighbourhood was built in the early 1960s. The Carrefour de la Seigneurie shopping mall acted as a commercial anchor to the area, hosting a Dominion supermarket, a branch of the Canadian Imperial Bank of Commerce, a convenience store, a pharmacy and a medical clinic. A Texaco gas station stood in its parking lot. All these businesses have since moved on or disappeared and today the mall has been eclipsed by more modern shopping centres such as the Carrefour de la Rive Sud. The neighbourhood is served by two francophone primary schools: De la Broquerie and Pierre-Boucher. There were no English-language schools in the neighbourhood. Students were bussed to either the Boucherville Elementary School (Protestant) or Marguerite Bourgeois (Catholic).

The Le domaine Sabrevois neighbourhood was built in the early 1970s. It is located east of de Montarville boul., between the streets Samuel de Champlain and Jacques-Cartier.

The Faubourg Sainte-Anne was a neighbourhood located at the south-western edge of the village, at the intersection of what are now the Montarville and Marie-Victorin boulevards (then known as "chemin de la Savanne" and "rue Sainte-Famille" respectively). Including lots 153 to 159 and serviced by several small streets, the district was last mentioned in notarized records in 1875. A plan of the neighbourhood survives in the archives of the Séminaire Saint-Joseph de Trois-Rivières.

=== Climate ===
Boucherville has a humid continental climate (Köppen: Dfb).

Climate data for Boucherville
| Month | Jan | Feb | Mar | Apr | May | Jun | Jul | Aug | Sep | Oct | Nov | Dec | Year |
|---|---|---|---|---|---|---|---|---|---|---|---|---|---|
| Mean daily maximum °C (°F) | −4.9 (23.2) | −3.0 (26.6) | 3.1 (37.6) | 11.5 (52.7) | 19.3 (66.7) | 23.8 (74.8) | 26.3 (79.3) | 25.4 (77.7) | 21.3 (70.3) | 13.6 (56.5) | 6.1 (43.0) | −1.3 (29.7) | 11.8 (53.2) |
| Daily mean °C (°F) | −8.6 (16.5) | −7.2 (19.0) | −1.2 (29.8) | 6.6 (43.9) | 14.1 (57.4) | 19.0 (66.2) | 21.6 (70.9) | 20.5 (68.9) | 16.1 (61.0) | 9.4 (48.9) | 2.6 (36.7) | −4.3 (24.3) | 7.4 (45.3) |
| Mean daily minimum °C (°F) | −12.9 (8.8) | −12.1 (10.2) | −5.8 (21.6) | 1.7 (35.1) | 8.6 (47.5) | 13.8 (56.8) | 16.7 (62.1) | 15.7 (60.3) | 11.4 (52.5) | 5.4 (41.7) | −1.1 (30.0) | −7.9 (17.8) | 2.8 (37.0) |
| Average precipitation mm (inches) | 59.8 (2.35) | 56.9 (2.24) | 61.4 (2.42) | 74.4 (2.93) | 68.5 (2.70) | 91.5 (3.60) | 88.7 (3.49) | 90.8 (3.57) | 69.2 (2.72) | 73.8 (2.91) | 62.6 (2.46) | 77.3 (3.04) | 874.9 (34.43) |
Source: Weather.Directory

== Demographics ==
Historical populations
| Year | Pop. | ±% |
|---|---|---|
| 1861 | 882 | — |
| 1871 | 767 | −13.0% |
| 1881 | 1,165 | +51.9% |
| 1891 | 821 | −29.5% |
| 1901 | 940 | +14.5% |
| 1911 | 1,097 | +16.7% |
| 1921 | 934 | −14.9% |
| 1931 | 883 | −5.5% |
| 1941 | 1,047 | +18.6% |
| 1951 | 1,583 | +51.2% |
| 1956 | 3,911 | +147.1% |
| 1961 | 7,403 | +89.3% |
| 1966 | 15,338 | +107.2% |
| 1971 | 19,997 | +30.4% |
| 1976 | 25,530 | +27.7% |
| 1981 | 29,704 | +16.3% |
| 1986 | 31,116 | +4.8% |
| 1991 | 33,796 | +8.6% |
| 1996 | 34,989 | +3.5% |
| 2001 | 36,253 | +3.6% |
| 2006 | 39,062 | +7.7% |
| 2011 | 40,753 | +4.3% |
| 2016 | 41,595 | +2.1% |
| 2021 | 41,743 | +0.4% |

In the 2021 Census of Population conducted by Statistics Canada, Boucherville had a population of 41,743 living in 17,291 of its 17,733 total private dwellings, a change of 0.2% from its 2016 population of 41,671. With a land area of 71.02 km^{2} (27.42 sq mi), it had a population density of 587.8/km^{2} (1,522.3/sq mi) in 2021.

In 1681, the village included 179 inhabitants that was distributed into 39 families, living on 320 acres of cultivated land.

In an 1811 report by Jacques Viger, the village included:

- 1 physician
- 4 windmills (3 operative)
- 6 merchants
- 6 blacksmiths
- 5 weavers
- 2 coopers
- 8 cabinetmakers (of which 2 also were carpenters)
- 5 butchers
- 1 wheelwright
- 2 masons
- 2 bakers
- 6 shoemakers (of which one also was a saddlemaker)
- 3 innkeepers
- 2 schools
- 91 houses (25 made of stone)

Languages of Boucherville Citizens
Canada Census Mother Tongue - Boucherville, Quebec
| Census | Total | French | | | English | | | French & English | | | Other | | |
| Year | Responses | Count | Trend | Pop % | Count | Trend | Pop % | Count | Trend | Pop % | Count | Trend | Pop % |
| 2021 | 41,145 | 36,215 | ▼4.6% | 88.01% | 1,000 | ▲13.6% | 2.4% | 495 | ▲73.7% | 1.2% | 2,990 | ▲36.5% | 7.26% |
| 2016 | 41,595 | 37,970 | ▲1.11% | 91.28% | 880 | ▼6.8% | 2.11% | 285 | ▲9.6% | 0.68% | 2,190 | ▲26.96% | 5,26% |
| 2011 | 40,655 | 37,550 | ▲4.19% | 92.36% | 945 | ▲23.52% | 2.32% | 260 | ▲117% | 0.63% | 1,725 | ▲9.18% | 4.24% |
| 2006 | 38,505 | 36,040 | ▲7.28% | 93.59% | 765 | ▼5.5% | 1.98% | 120 | ▼47.82% | 0.31% | 1,580 | ▲483.36% | 4.1% |
| 2001 | 35,700 | 33,595 | ▲3.23% | 94.1% | 810 | ▲0.12% | 2.27% | 230 | ▲39.39% | 0.64% | 1,065 | ▲12.10% | 2.98% |
| 1996 | 34,535 | 32,545 | n/a | 94.24% | 800 | n/a | 2.31% | 165 | n/a | 0.5% | 950 | n/a | 2.75% |

First language of Boucherville's Citizens (2021)
| Language | Population | Percentage (%) |
|---|---|---|
| French | 36,215 | 88.0% |
| English | 1,000 | 2.4% |
| Both English and French | 495 | 1.2% |
| French and a non-official language | 290 | 0.7% |
| English and a non-official language | 65 | 0.2% |
| English, French and a non-official language | 60 | 0.1% |
| Spanish | 770 | 1.9% |
| Arabic | 395 | 1.0% |
| Italian | 300 | 0.7% |
| Portuguese | 255 | 0.6% |
| Mandarin | 200 | 0.5% |
| Russian | 140 | 0.3% |
| Romanian | 115 | 0.3% |

== Economy ==
Boucherville's industrial park, located near Highway 20 expanded considerably in the 1980s. In an area covering roughly 7 km^{2}, 575 businesses now provide employment to 23 000 people.

Since 1974, the head office of Rona, a Canadian distributor and retailer in hardware, home improvement and gardening products, has been located in Boucherville. Other companies that are or were based in Boucherville include Campagna Motors, St. Just Aviation, Noveko International, Dana TM4 and Proxim.

"Têtes à claques", a French language internet phenomenon, is also based in the city of Boucherville.

== Arts and culture ==
=== Internet ===
Quebec internet comedy website Têtes à claques is based in Boucherville.

=== Youth centre ===
In 1973, a youth drop-in centre, the Maison des Jeunes was opened at 78 boulevard Marie-Victorin. From March 30, 1974 to late June 1974, the Maison enjoyed financial support from the local Club Richelieu.

On November 19, 1975, the Maison then moved to the old town hall, at 20 rue Pierre-Boucher. It remained there for over a quarter century, with the exception of three months in 1982 when it was relocated to the Boucherville Elementary School while the building was being renovated.

In 2001, the Maison des jeunes la Piaule moved into its new purpose-built facilities on chemin du Lac.

== Attractions ==
The Îles-de-Boucherville National Park on the Boucherville Islands is a Quebec National Park located in the Saint Lawrence River facing the rest of the city. They are uninhabited but serve as a natural/recreational area for residents and tourists.

== Sports ==
There are two main multifunctional sports facilities in the city of Boucherville.

=== Complexe aquatique Laurie-Eve-Cormier ===
On September 9, 2017 the Complexe aquatique Laurie-Eve-Cormier officially replaced the Centre sportif Pierre-Laporte.

=== Centre multifonctionnel Francine-Gadbois ===
Located on Lionel-Daunais road, the centre offers cultural and sporting spaces.

=== Outdoor sports ===
In 2013, Boucherville's disc golf course became the first course in the Greater Montreal area to be fully publicly funded.

== Education ==
=== Primary ===
As of 2015, there are seven French-language public primary schools, one French-language private primary school and one English-language public primary school.

- École Père-Marquette
- École Louis-H-Lafontaine
- École Paul VI
- École Antoine-Girouard
- École De la Broquerie
- École Les Jeunes Découvreurs
- École Pierre Boucher
- École les Trois Saisons (Private)
- Boucherville Elementary School (English Public, originally the Boucherville Protestant School)

=== Secondary ===
Boucherville's only high school, the French-language public École secondaire de Mortagne was built in 1968. A dress code including a uniform was introduced in 2012.

There has never been an English-language high school in Boucherville.

=== English language education ===
The South Shore Protestant Regional School Board previously served the municipality.

Currently, English-language public education is provided by the Riverside School Board.

== Sister cities ==
- Mortagne-au-Perche, France since 1966
- Les Abymes, France since 1988
- Kingston, Canada

== Notable people ==
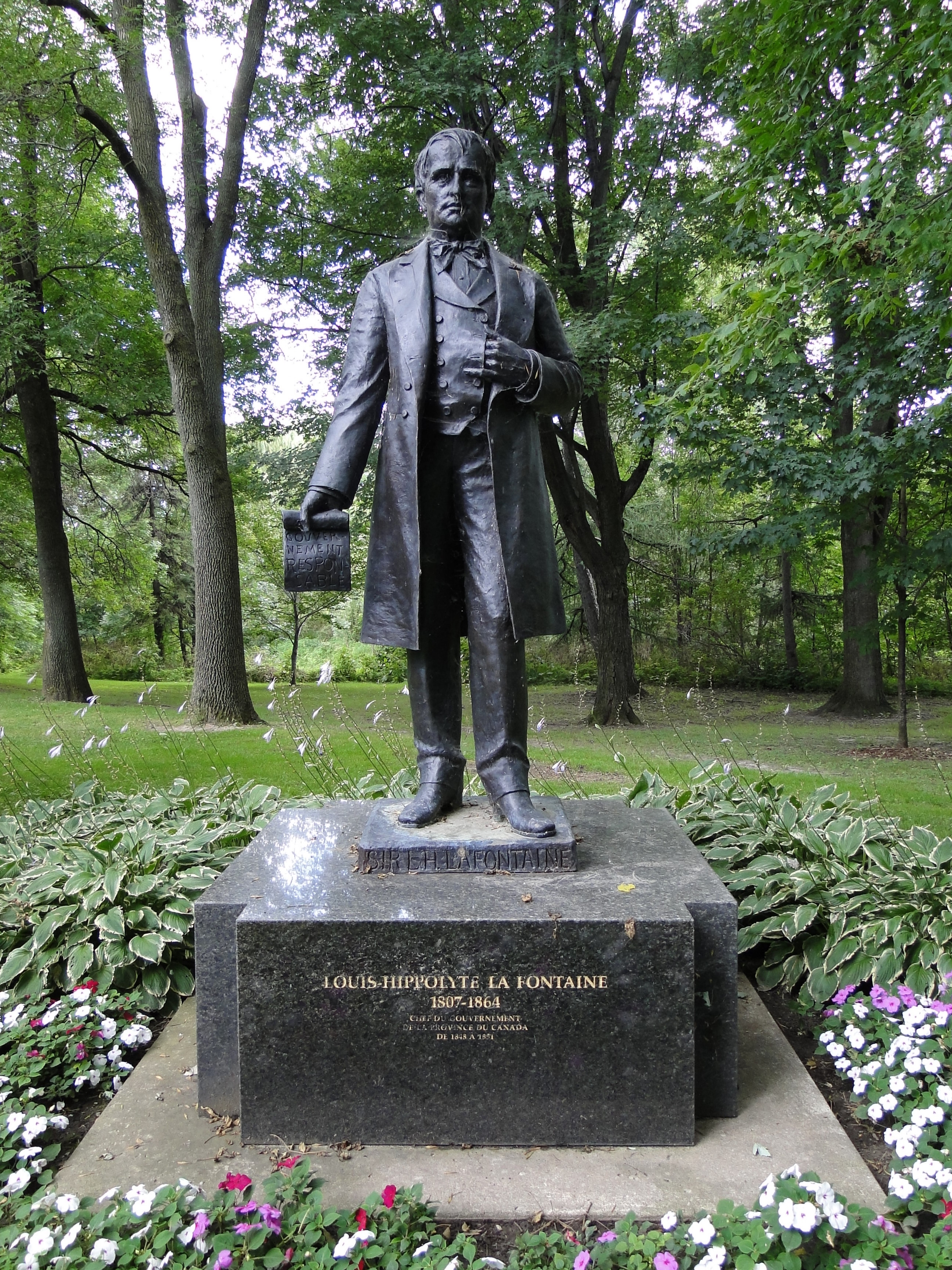
Statue of Louis-Hippolyte Lafontaine in Boucherville

- Marien Tailhandier (1665-1738) surgeon and judge
- Antoine Ménard, dit Lafontaine (1744–1825), building contractor, political figure and grandfather of Louis-Hippolyte Lafontaine
- Toussaint Charbonneau (1767-1843), member of the American Lewis and Clark Expedition to the Pacific Ocean, and husband of Lemhi Shoshone guide Sacagawea
- Étienne Desmarteau (1873–1905), policeman and first Olympic medalist from Quebec (1904 Olympics)
- François-Louis Tremblay, short track speed skater and Olympic medalist
- Louis-Hippolyte Lafontaine (1807–1864), former premier of the Province of Canada
- Louis Lacoste (1798–1878), notary and politician
- Michel Beaudet, creator of Les Têtes à Claques
- Pierre Boucher (1622–1717), founder of Boucherville
- Stéphane Quintal, former ice hockey player
- Ginette Reno, Singer and actress
- Jonathan Duhamel, winner of the 2010 World Series of Poker Main Event
- Marcel Danis, former Cabinet minister under Prime Minister Brian Mulroney
- Pierre-Luc Gagnon, professional vert skateboarder
- Sebastien Lareau, professional tennis player
- Rita Baga, drag queen, runner-up of Season 1 of Canada's Drag Race, 3rd/4th place on Canada's Drag Race: Canada vs. the World, host of Drag Race Belgique
- Gisèle Lullaby, drag queen and winner of Season 3 of Canada's Drag Race

== See also ==
- Pierre Boucher, Founder of Boucherville
- Îles-de-Boucherville National Park
- Fleuve Saint-Laurent
- Rivière aux Pins (Boucherville)
- Sabrevois River
- Louis-Hippolyte Lafontaine Bridge-Tunnel
- List of cities in Quebec
- Louis-Hippolyte Lafontaine House (Boucherville)
