= 2025 CCAA/Curling Canada College Curling Championships =

2025 CCAA/Curling Canada College Championships
- Host city: Lethbridge, Alberta
- Arena: Lethbridge Curling Club
- Dates: February 24–28
- Men's winner: (Ontario) Mohawk Mountaineers
- Skip: Jacob Jones
- Third: Joel Matthews
- Second: Eric Just
- Lead: Jarrett Matthews
- Alternate: Thomas Del Conte
- Coach: Elizabeth Anne Calic
- Finalist: (Alberta) SAIT Trojans (Baum)
- Women's winner: (British Columbia) PACWEST
- Skip: Emily Bowles
- Third: Erin Fitzgibbon
- Second: Alex Ashton
- Lead: Lauren Cochrane
- Coach: Kris Gira
- Finalist: (Alberta) Red Deer Polytechnic Queens (Raniseth)

The 2025 CCAA/Curling Canada College Championships were held from February 24 to 28 at the Lethbridge Curling Club in Lethbridge, Alberta. The event was hosted by the University of Lethbridge. The event was held in conjunction with the 2025 U Sports/Curling Canada University Curling Championships, the Canadian university curling championship.

== Men ==
=== Teams ===
The teams are listed as follows:

Team	Skip	Third	Second	Lead	Alternate	College
Assiniboine Cougars	Jordan Ricard (Fourth)	Michael Wytinck	Gavin Chuhai	Oscar Funk (Skip)		(Manitoba) Assiniboine Community College
Gaillards du Cégep	Adam Bédard	Nathan Beaudoin-Gendron	Marc-Antoine Robert	Maël Chrétien		(Quebec) Cégep de l'Abitibi-Témiscamingue
Humber Hawks	Jacob Dobson	Noah Garner	Matthew Abrams	Matthew Moretto		(Ontario) Humber College
Mohawk Mountaineers	Jacob Jones	Joel Matthews	Eric Just	Jarrett Matthews	Thomas Del Conte	(Ontario) Mohawk College
NAIT Ooks	Anders van Amsterdam	Tyler Brodt	Matthew Hannah	Nolan Peters	Dante Bacchetto	Northern Alberta Institute of Technology
Red Deer Polytechnic Kings	Nick Woznesensky	Jaden Morlock	Reece Brigley	Aiden Berube	Rhett Whittmire	(Alberta) Red Deer Polytechnic
SAIT Trojans	David Baum	Nick Mitsopoulos	Justin Reay	Jacob Shea	Brady Johnson	Southern Alberta Institute of Technology
Sault Cougars	Evan Robert	Justin Mackay	Charles Darling	Ben Appleton	Jake Clouthier	(Ontario) Sault College

=== Round robin standings ===
Final Round Robin Standings

Key
Teams to Playoffs

Team	Skip	W	L	W–L	PF	PA	EW	EL	BE	SE	LSD
(Ontario) Mohawk Mountaineers	Jacob Jones	7	0	–	55	21	28	18	0	9	555.7
(Alberta) SAIT Trojans	David Baum	5	2	1–1	45	31	28	19	1	9	608.1
(Alberta) Red Deer Polytechnic Kings	Nick Woznesensky	5	2	1–1	41	30	24	20	8	6	684.6
(Ontario) Sault Cougars	Evan Robert	5	2	1–1	40	27	23	20	3	8	1106.3
(Ontario) Humber Hawks	Jacob Dobson	2	5	1–1	41	47	22	28	1	4	775.9
(Quebec) Gaillards du Cégep	Adam Bédard	2	5	1–1	31	46	19	26	1	3	999.5
(Alberta) NAIT Ooks	Anders van Amsterdam	2	5	1–1	36	41	26	24	2	11	1423.0
(Manitoba) Assiniboine Cougars	Oscar Funk	0	7	–	18	64	15	30	0	2	1355.1

Round Robin Summary Table
Pos.	Team	(Manitoba) ACC	(Quebec) RSEQ	(Ontario) HUM	(Ontario) MOH	(Alberta) NAIT	(Alberta) RDP	(Alberta) SAIT	(Ontario) SAU	Record
8	(Manitoba) Assiniboine Cougars	—	4–7	3–11	2–11	3–7	3–7	1–11	2–10	0–7
6	(Quebec) Gaillards du Cégep	7–4	—	9–2	3–7	4–7	3–8	3–8	2–10	2–5
5	(Ontario) Humber Hawks	11–3	2–9	—	5–7	8–7	4–7	6–7	5–7	2–5
1	(Ontario) Mohawk Mountaineers	11–2	7–3	7–5	—	8–2	9–4	9–3	4–2	7–0
7	(Alberta) NAIT Ooks	7–3	7–4	7–8	2–8	—	3–6	5–6	5–6	2–5
3	(Alberta) Red Deer Polytechnic Kings	7–3	8–3	7–4	4–9	6–3	—	6–4	3–4	5–2
2	(Alberta) SAIT Trojans	11–1	8–3	7–6	3–9	6–5	4–6	—	6–1	5–2
4	(Ontario) Sault Cougars	10–2	10–2	7–5	2–4	6–5	4–3	1–6	—	5–2

=== Round robin results ===
All draws are listed in Mountain Time (UTC−07:00).

==== Draw 2 ====
Monday, February 24, 9:00 pm

Sheet A	1	2	3	4	5	6	7	8	Final
(Manitoba) Assiniboine Cougars (Funk)	0	1	1	0	1	0	1	X	4
(Quebec) Gaillards du Cégep (Bédard)	1	0	0	2	0	4	0	X	7

Sheet C	1	2	3	4	5	6	7	8	Final
(Alberta) SAIT Trojans (Baum)	0	1	2	1	0	1	1	X	6
(Ontario) Sault Cougars (Robert)	0	0	0	0	1	0	0	X	1

Sheet E	1	2	3	4	5	6	7	8	Final
(Ontario) Humber Hawks (Dobson)	0	2	0	1	1	0	1	0	5
(Ontario) Mohawk Mountaineers (Jones)	1	0	1	0	0	2	0	3	7

Sheet F	1	2	3	4	5	6	7	8	Final
(Alberta) NAIT Ooks (van Amsterdam)	0	1	0	1	0	1	0	X	3
(Alberta) Red Deer Polytechnic Kings (Woznesensky)	3	0	1	0	0	0	2	X	6

==== Draw 4 ====
Tuesday, February 25, 12:30 pm

Sheet A	1	2	3	4	5	6	7	8	Final
(Alberta) SAIT Trojans (Baum)	3	1	0	1	0	1	0	1	7
(Ontario) Humber Hawks (Dobson)	0	0	1	0	2	0	3	0	6

Sheet D	1	2	3	4	5	6	7	8	Final
(Alberta) Red Deer Polytechnic Kings (Woznesensky)	0	0	4	0	1	0	3	X	8
(Quebec) Gaillards du Cégep (Bédard)	1	0	0	1	0	1	0	X	3

Sheet F	1	2	3	4	5	6	7	8	Final
(Ontario) Sault Cougars (Robert)	0	0	1	0	1	0	0	X	2
(Ontario) Mohawk Mountaineers (Jones)	1	0	0	1	0	2	0	X	4

Sheet H	1	2	3	4	5	6	7	8	Final
(Alberta) NAIT Ooks (van Amsterdam)	1	0	1	0	3	1	1	X	7
(Manitoba) Assiniboine Cougars (Funk)	0	1	0	2	0	0	0	X	3

==== Draw 6 ====
Tuesday, February 25, 8:30 pm

Sheet B	1	2	3	4	5	6	7	8	Final
(Quebec) Gaillards du Cégep (Bédard)	0	2	3	0	2	0	2	X	9
(Ontario) Humber Hawks (Dobson)	0	0	0	1	0	1	0	X	2

Sheet D	1	2	3	4	5	6	7	8	Final
(Ontario) Mohawk Mountaineers (Jones)	5	1	0	4	1	0	X	X	11
(Manitoba) Assiniboine Cougars (Funk)	0	0	1	0	0	1	X	X	2

Sheet E	1	2	3	4	5	6	7	8	Final
(Alberta) Red Deer Polytechnic Kings (Woznesensky)	0	2	1	0	2	0	0	1	6
(Alberta) SAIT Trojans (Baum)	1	0	0	2	0	1	0	0	4

Sheet G	1	2	3	4	5	6	7	8	Final
(Ontario) Sault Cougars (Robert)	1	0	1	0	0	3	0	1	6
(Alberta) NAIT Ooks (van Amsterdam)	0	1	0	0	1	0	3	0	5

==== Draw 8 ====
Wednesday, February 26, 12:30 pm

Sheet B	1	2	3	4	5	6	7	8	Final
(Manitoba) Assiniboine Cougars (Funk)	0	0	0	0	1	0	X	X	1
(Alberta) SAIT Trojans (Baum)	2	3	2	3	0	1	X	X	11

Sheet C	1	2	3	4	5	6	7	8	Final
(Ontario) Humber Hawks (Dobson)	0	0	0	3	3	1	0	1	8
(Alberta) NAIT Ooks (van Amsterdam)	3	1	2	0	0	0	1	0	7

Sheet G	1	2	3	4	5	6	7	8	Final
(Ontario) Mohawk Mountaineers (Jones)	3	0	2	0	0	2	0	2	9
(Alberta) Red Deer Polytechnic Kings (Woznesensky)	0	1	0	1	2	0	0	0	4

Sheet H	1	2	3	4	5	6	7	8	Final
(Quebec) Gaillards du Cégep (Bédard)	0	0	0	1	0	1	X	X	2
(Ontario) Sault Cougars (Robert)	2	2	4	0	2	0	X	X	10

==== Draw 10 ====
Wednesday, February 26, 8:30 pm

Sheet A	1	2	3	4	5	6	7	8	Final
(Alberta) NAIT Ooks (van Amsterdam)	0	0	0	1	0	1	0	X	2
(Ontario) Mohawk Mountaineers (Jones)	3	1	1	0	1	0	2	X	8

Sheet B	1	2	3	4	5	6	7	8	9	Final
(Alberta) Red Deer Polytechnic Kings (Woznesensky)	0	1	0	0	0	2	0	0	0	3
(Ontario) Sault Cougars (Robert)	0	0	1	0	0	0	0	2	1	4

Sheet F	1	2	3	4	5	6	7	8	Final
(Alberta) SAIT Trojans (Baum)	3	0	1	2	0	2	X	X	8
(Quebec) Gaillards du Cégep (Bédard)	0	1	0	0	2	0	X	X	3

Sheet G	1	2	3	4	5	6	7	8	Final
(Ontario) Humber Hawks (Dobson)	6	0	3	0	0	2	X	X	11
(Manitoba) Assiniboine Cougars (Funk)	0	1	0	1	1	0	X	X	3

==== Draw 11 ====
Thursday, February 27, 8:30 am

Sheet C	1	2	3	4	5	6	7	8	Final
(Quebec) Gaillards du Cégep (Bédard)	0	0	1	1	0	1	0	X	3
(Ontario) Mohawk Mountaineers (Jones)	2	1	0	0	1	0	3	X	7

Sheet D	1	2	3	4	5	6	7	8	9	Final
(Alberta) SAIT Trojans (Baum)	0	0	1	0	2	0	0	2	1	6
(Alberta) NAIT Ooks (van Amsterdam)	1	1	0	2	0	0	1	0	0	5

Sheet E	1	2	3	4	5	6	7	8	Final
(Ontario) Sault Cougars (Robert)	1	0	1	3	2	0	3	X	10
(Manitoba) Assiniboine Cougars (Funk)	0	1	0	0	0	1	0	X	2

Sheet H	1	2	3	4	5	6	7	8	Final
(Alberta) Red Deer Polytechnic Kings (Woznesensky)	2	0	3	0	1	1	0	X	7
(Ontario) Humber Hawks (Dobson)	0	2	0	1	0	0	1	X	4

==== Draw 13 ====
Thursday, February 27, 4:30 pm

Sheet C	1	2	3	4	5	6	7	8	Final
(Manitoba) Assiniboine Cougars (Funk)	0	0	3	0	0	0	0	X	3
(Alberta) Red Deer Polytechnic Kings (Woznesensky)	0	1	0	1	2	1	2	X	7

Sheet D	1	2	3	4	5	6	7	8	Final
(Ontario) Sault Cougars (Robert)	0	1	0	2	0	2	0	2	7
(Ontario) Humber Hawks (Dobson)	2	0	1	0	0	0	2	0	5

Sheet E	1	2	3	4	5	6	7	8	Final
(Quebec) Gaillards du Cégep (Bédard)	0	3	0	1	0	0	0	X	4
(Alberta) NAIT Ooks (van Amsterdam)	1	0	1	0	3	1	1	X	7

Sheet H	1	2	3	4	5	6	7	8	Final
(Ontario) Mohawk Mountaineers (Jones)	0	2	1	2	0	4	X	X	9
(Alberta) SAIT Trojans (Baum)	1	0	0	0	2	0	X	X	3

=== Playoffs ===
Semifinal
1	(Ontario) Mohawk Mountaineers	9
4	(Ontario) Sault Cougars	3
2	(Alberta) SAIT Trojans	4
3	(Alberta) Red Deer Polytechnic Kings	3

Final
1	(Ontario) Mohawk Mountaineers	8
2	(Alberta) SAIT Trojans	4
Bronze medal game
4	(Ontario) Sault Cougars	2
3	(Alberta) Red Deer Polytechnic Kings	8

==== Semifinals ====
Friday, February 28, 9:30 am

Sheet A	1	2	3	4	5	6	7	8	Final
(Ontario) Mohawk Mountaineers (Jones)	2	5	0	1	0	0	1	X	9
(Ontario) Sault Cougars (Robert)	0	0	1	0	1	1	0	X	3

Sheet B	1	2	3	4	5	6	7	8	Final
(Alberta) SAIT Trojans (Baum)	1	0	1	1	0	0	0	1	4
(Alberta) Red Deer Polytechnic Kings (Woznesensky)	0	1	0	0	1	1	0	0	3

==== Bronze medal game ====
Friday, February 28, 2:30 pm

Sheet H	1	2	3	4	5	6	7	8	Final
(Ontario) Sault Cougars (Robert)	0	0	2	0	0	0	X	X	2
(Alberta) Red Deer Polytechnic Kings (Woznesensky)	1	1	0	0	5	1	X	X	8

==== Final ====
Friday, February 28, 2:30 pm

Sheet F	1	2	3	4	5	6	7	8	Final
(Ontario) Mohawk Mountaineers (Jones)	0	2	0	0	1	0	2	3	8
(Alberta) SAIT Trojans (Baum)	0	0	2	0	0	2	0	0	4

=== Final standings ===
Place	Team
1st place, gold medalist(s)	(Ontario) Mohawk Mountaineers
2nd place, silver medalist(s)	(Alberta) SAIT Trojans
3rd place, bronze medalist(s)	(Alberta) Red Deer Polytechnic Kings
4	(Ontario) Sault Cougars
5	(Ontario) Humber Hawks
6	(Quebec) Gaillards du Cégep
7	(Alberta) NAIT Ooks
8	(Manitoba) Assiniboine Cougars

== Women ==
=== Teams ===
The teams are listed as follows:

Team	Skip	Third	Second	Lead	Alternate	College
Assiniboine Cougars	Kristen Carlson	Ashlie Jewar	Robyn Newsome	Kristen Willemen	Michelle Foote	(Manitoba) Assiniboine Community College
Concordia Thunder	Gabrielle Wood	Payton Sonnenberg	Tori Hartwell	Rachel Jost		(Alberta) Concordia University of Edmonton
Fanshawe Falcons	Parker Doig	Veronica Van Broekhoven	Kara Wrightson	Abigail Brown	Frannie Richardson	(Ontario) Fanshawe College
Humber Hawks	Hailey Brittain	Krysten Elson	Amy Johnson	Kathryn Campion	Julia Stradiotto	(Ontario) Humber College
Mohawk Mountaineers	Hailey Money	Sophia Novo	Kerri Smith	Natalie Scholtens	Ava Andrews	(Ontario) Mohawk College
PACWEST	Emily Bowles	Erin Fitzgibbon	Alex Ashton	Lauren Cochrane		(British Columbia) Pacific Western Athletic Association
Red Deer Polytechnic Queens	Kaylee Raniseth	Cuyler Desormeau	Morgan DeSchiffart	Nicole Homan	Cassidy Blair	(Alberta) Red Deer Polytechnic
SAIT Trojans	Kayleigh Shannon	Bayly Scoffin	Raelyn Helston	Madison Milot	Samantha Atkinson	Southern Alberta Institute of Technology

=== Round robin standings ===
Final Round Robin Standings

Key
Teams to Playoffs

Team	Skip	W	L	W–L	PF	PA	EW	EL	BE	SE	LSD
(Alberta) Red Deer Polytechnic Queens	Kaylee Raniseth	7	0	–	59	13	33	10	2	19	982.8
(British Columbia) PACWEST	Emily Bowles	6	1	–	51	30	26	19	1	10	629.1
(Alberta) Concordia Thunder	Gabrielle Wood	5	2	–	53	30	24	22	1	9	764.6
(Alberta) SAIT Trojans	Kayleigh Shannon	4	3	–	50	35	27	21	1	9	1125.3
(Ontario) Fanshawe Falcons	Parker Doig	3	4	–	46	37	26	19	1	11	613.6
(Manitoba) Assiniboine Cougars	Kristen Carlson	2	5	–	28	52	18	27	0	6	1503.0
(Ontario) Mohawk Mountaineers	Hailey Money	1	6	–	23	62	15	33	0	3	1267.6
(Ontario) Humber Hawks	Hailey Brittain	0	7	–	16	67	13	31	1	2	864.3

Round Robin Summary Table
Pos.	Team	(Manitoba) ACC	(Alberta) CON	(Ontario) FAN	(Ontario) HUM	(Ontario) MOH	(British Columbia) PAC	(Alberta) RDP	(Alberta) SAIT	Record
6	(Manitoba) Assiniboine Cougars	—	2–9	2–8	10–2	8–3	3–12	1–9	2–9	2–5
3	(Alberta) Concordia Thunder	9–2	—	10–2	10–4	10–2	4–6	1–8	9–6	5–2
5	(Ontario) Fanshawe Falcons	8–2	2–10	—	13–1	10–4	5–7	3–5	5–8	3–4
8	(Ontario) Humber Hawks	2–10	4–10	1–13	—	3–7	2–8	2–11	2–8	0–7
7	(Ontario) Mohawk Mountaineers	3–8	2–10	4–10	7–3	—	2–11	1–10	4–10	1–6
2	(British Columbia) PACWEST	12–3	6–4	7–5	8–2	11–2	—	1–9	6–5	6–1
1	(Alberta) Red Deer Polytechnic Queens	9–1	8–1	5–3	11–2	10–1	9–1	—	7–4	7–0
4	(Alberta) SAIT Trojans	9–2	6–9	8–5	8–2	10–4	5–6	4–7	—	4–3

=== Round robin results ===
All draws are listed in Mountain Time (UTC−07:00).

==== Draw 1 ====
Monday, February 24, 3:30 pm

Sheet A	1	2	3	4	5	6	7	8	Final
(Manitoba) Assiniboine Cougars (Carlson)	0	1	0	0	1	0	X	X	2
(Alberta) SAIT Trojans (Shannon)	2	0	1	2	0	4	X	X	9

Sheet C	1	2	3	4	5	6	7	8	Final
(Ontario) Humber Hawks (Brittain)	0	0	0	0	2	0	X	X	2
(Alberta) Red Deer Polytechnic Queens (Raniseth)	3	2	2	2	0	2	X	X	11

Sheet E	1	2	3	4	5	6	7	8	Final
(Alberta) Concordia Thunder (Wood)	0	0	1	0	2	0	1	0	4
(British Columbia) PACWEST (Bowles)	0	1	0	3	0	1	0	1	6

Sheet F	1	2	3	4	5	6	7	8	Final
(Ontario) Mohawk Mountaineers (Money)	0	0	2	0	2	0	0	X	4
(Ontario) Fanshawe Falcons (Doig)	3	4	0	1	0	1	1	X	10

==== Draw 3 ====
Tuesday, February 25, 8:30 am

Sheet A	1	2	3	4	5	6	7	8	Final
(Ontario) Humber Hawks (Brittain)	2	0	0	1	1	0	X	X	4
(Alberta) Concordia Thunder (Wood)	0	4	3	0	0	3	X	X	10

Sheet D	1	2	3	4	5	6	7	8	Final
(Ontario) Fanshawe Falcons (Doig)	1	0	0	0	1	0	3	0	5
(Alberta) SAIT Trojans (Shannon)	0	1	0	2	0	2	0	3	8

Sheet F	1	2	3	4	5	6	7	8	Final
(Alberta) Red Deer Polytechnic Queens (Raniseth)	0	2	1	2	3	1	X	X	9
(British Columbia) PACWEST (Bowles)	1	0	0	0	0	0	X	X	1

Sheet H	1	2	3	4	5	6	7	8	Final
(Ontario) Mohawk Mountaineers (Money)	0	1	0	0	0	2	0	0	3
(Manitoba) Assiniboine Cougars (Carlson)	2	0	1	1	2	0	1	1	8

==== Draw 5 ====
Tuesday, February 25, 4:30 pm

Sheet B	1	2	3	4	5	6	7	8	Final
(Alberta) SAIT Trojans (Shannon)	2	2	0	1	0	1	0	0	6
(Alberta) Concordia Thunder (Wood)	0	0	4	0	1	0	2	2	9

Sheet D	1	2	3	4	5	6	7	8	Final
(British Columbia) PACWEST (Bowles)	5	0	1	2	0	1	3	X	12
(Manitoba) Assiniboine Cougars (Carlson)	0	2	0	0	1	0	0	X	3

Sheet E	1	2	3	4	5	6	7	8	Final
(Ontario) Fanshawe Falcons (Doig)	1	0	3	2	3	4	X	X	13
(Ontario) Humber Hawks (Brittain)	0	1	0	0	0	0	X	X	1

Sheet G	1	2	3	4	5	6	7	8	Final
(Alberta) Red Deer Polytechnic Queens (Raniseth)	3	3	0	2	1	1	X	X	10
(Ontario) Mohawk Mountaineers (Money)	0	0	1	0	0	0	X	X	1

==== Draw 7 ====
Wednesday, February 26, 8:30 am

Sheet B	1	2	3	4	5	6	7	8	Final
(Manitoba) Assiniboine Cougars (Carlson)	1	1	0	4	4	0	X	X	10
(Ontario) Humber Hawks (Brittain)	0	0	1	0	0	1	X	X	2

Sheet C	1	2	3	4	5	6	7	8	Final
(Alberta) Concordia Thunder (Wood)	0	3	4	0	2	1	X	X	10
(Ontario) Mohawk Mountaineers (Money)	1	0	0	1	0	0	X	X	2

Sheet G	1	2	3	4	5	6	7	8	Final
(British Columbia) PACWEST (Bowles)	0	4	0	0	0	3	0	X	7
(Ontario) Fanshawe Falcons (Doig)	0	0	1	2	1	0	1	X	5

Sheet H	1	2	3	4	5	6	7	8	Final
(Alberta) SAIT Trojans (Shannon)	0	2	0	1	0	1	0	X	4
(Alberta) Red Deer Polytechnic Queens (Raniseth)	1	0	2	0	2	0	2	X	7

==== Draw 9 ====
Wednesday, February 26, 4:30 pm

Sheet A	1	2	3	4	5	6	7	8	Final
(Ontario) Mohawk Mountaineers (Money)	0	0	2	0	0	0	X	X	2
(British Columbia) PACWEST (Bowles)	1	2	0	2	3	3	X	X	11

Sheet B	1	2	3	4	5	6	7	8	Final
(Ontario) Fanshawe Falcons (Doig)	0	0	0	0	1	0	2	0	3
(Alberta) Red Deer Polytechnic Queens (Raniseth)	0	0	1	2	0	1	0	1	5

Sheet F	1	2	3	4	5	6	7	8	Final
(Ontario) Humber Hawks (Brittain)	1	0	0	0	1	0	X	X	2
(Alberta) SAIT Trojans (Shannon)	0	4	1	2	0	1	X	X	8

Sheet G	1	2	3	4	5	6	7	8	Final
(Alberta) Concordia Thunder (Wood)	2	0	2	2	3	0	X	X	9
(Manitoba) Assiniboine Cougars (Carlson)	0	1	0	0	0	1	X	X	2

==== Draw 12 ====
Thursday, February 27, 12:30 pm

Sheet C	1	2	3	4	5	6	7	8	Final
(Alberta) SAIT Trojans (Shannon)	2	0	2	0	0	1	0	0	5
(British Columbia) PACWEST (Bowles)	0	1	0	2	0	0	2	1	6

Sheet D	1	2	3	4	5	6	7	8	Final
(Ontario) Humber Hawks (Brittain)	0	0	0	1	0	1	1	0	3
(Ontario) Mohawk Mountaineers (Money)	1	3	1	0	1	0	0	1	7

Sheet E	1	2	3	4	5	6	7	8	Final
(Alberta) Red Deer Polytechnic Queens (Raniseth)	0	2	2	2	2	1	X	X	9
(Manitoba) Assiniboine Cougars (Carlson)	1	0	0	0	0	0	X	X	1

Sheet H	1	2	3	4	5	6	7	8	Final
(Ontario) Fanshawe Falcons (Doig)	0	0	1	0	1	0	0	X	2
(Alberta) Concordia Thunder (Wood)	2	1	0	3	0	2	2	X	10

==== Draw 14 ====
Thursday, February 27, 8:30 pm

Sheet C	1	2	3	4	5	6	7	8	Final
(Manitoba) Assiniboine Cougars (Carlson)	0	0	0	0	0	2	X	X	2
(Ontario) Fanshawe Falcons (Doig)	1	1	1	2	3	0	X	X	8

Sheet D	1	2	3	4	5	6	7	8	Final
(Alberta) Red Deer Polytechnic Queens (Raniseth)	2	1	0	1	1	3	X	X	8
(Alberta) Concordia Thunder (Wood)	0	0	1	0	0	0	X	X	1

Sheet E	1	2	3	4	5	6	7	8	Final
(Alberta) SAIT Trojans (Shannon)	0	2	0	5	1	1	1	X	10
(Ontario) Mohawk Mountaineers (Money)	1	0	3	0	0	0	0	X	4

Sheet H	1	2	3	4	5	6	7	8	Final
(British Columbia) PACWEST (Bowles)	2	0	1	1	0	2	2	X	8
(Ontario) Humber Hawks (Brittain)	0	2	0	0	0	0	0	X	2

=== Playoffs ===
Semifinal
1	(Alberta) Red Deer Polytechnic Queens	9
4	(Alberta) SAIT Trojans	4
2	(British Columbia) PACWEST	7
3	(Alberta) Concordia Thunder	5

Final
1	(Alberta) Red Deer Polytechnic Queens	4
2	(British Columbia) PACWEST	6
Bronze medal game
4	(Alberta) SAIT Trojans	5
3	(Alberta) Concordia Thunder	7

==== Semifinals ====
Friday, February 28, 9:30 am

Sheet F	1	2	3	4	5	6	7	8	Final
(Alberta) Red Deer Polytechnic Queens (Raniseth)	2	0	1	0	2	0	2	2	9
(Alberta) SAIT Trojans (Shannon)	0	1	0	2	0	1	0	0	4

Sheet G	1	2	3	4	5	6	7	8	Final
(British Columbia) PACWEST (Bowles)	5	0	0	2	0	0	0	X	7
(Alberta) Concordia Thunder (Wood)	0	1	1	0	2	0	1	X	5

==== Bronze medal game ====
Friday, February 28, 2:30 pm

Sheet A	1	2	3	4	5	6	7	8	9	Final
(Alberta) SAIT Trojans (Shannon)	0	0	0	0	3	0	2	0	0	5
(Alberta) Concordia Thunder (Wood)	0	1	0	0	0	2	0	2	2	7

==== Final ====
Friday, February 28, 2:30 pm

Sheet C	1	2	3	4	5	6	7	8	Final
(Alberta) Red Deer Polytechnic Queens (Raniseth)	2	0	0	0	0	2	0	X	4
(British Columbia) PACWEST (Bowles)	0	1	1	1	2	0	1	X	6

=== Final standings ===
Place	Team
1st place, gold medalist(s)	(British Columbia) PACWEST
2nd place, silver medalist(s)	(Alberta) Red Deer Polytechnic Queens
3rd place, bronze medalist(s)	(Alberta) Concordia Thunder
4	(Alberta) SAIT Trojans
5	(Ontario) Fanshawe Falcons
6	(Manitoba) Assiniboine Cougars
7	(Ontario) Mohawk Mountaineers
8	(Ontario) Humber Hawks
