= 2023 CCAA/Curling Canada College Curling Championships =

2023 CCAA/Curling Canada College Championships
- Host city: Sudbury, Ontario
- Arena: Gerry McCrory Countryside Sports Complex
- Dates: March 15–19
- Men's winner: (Ontario) Humber Hawks
- Skip: Jacob Dobson
- Third: Austin Snyder
- Second: Noah Garner
- Lead: Matthew Abrams
- Alternate: Kevin Genjaga
- Coach: Sean Turriff
- Finalist: (Alberta) SAIT Trojans (Helston)
- Women's winner: (Alberta) Augustana Vikings
- Skip: Josie Zimmerman
- Third: Bryn Woloshyn
- Second: Claire Bevan-Stewart
- Lead: Darby-Anne Swanson
- Alternate: Hope Zimmerman
- Coach: Carolyn McRorie
- Finalist: (Ontario) Niagara Knights (Randell)

The 2023 CCAA/Curling Canada College Championships were held from March 15 to 19 at the Gerry McCrory Countryside Sports Complex in Sudbury, Ontario. The event was hosted by Laurentian University. Sudbury was originally scheduled to host the 2022 edition of the event, however, it was cancelled due to the COVID-19 pandemic in Ontario. The event was held in conjunction with the 2023 U Sports/Curling Canada University Curling Championships, the Canadian university curling championship.

== Men ==
=== Teams ===
The teams are listed as follows:

Team	Skip	Third	Second	Lead	Alternate	College
Augustana Vikings	Beau Cornelson	Marcus Sawiak	Hunter Reese	Corbin Diprose		(Alberta) Augustana University College
Concordia Thunder	Braden Pelech	Matthew Wasylenko	Joshua Buchholtz	James McCabe		(Alberta) Concordia University of Edmonton
Fleming Knights	Nolan Galardo	Cameron Fraser	Finn Meakins	Michael Duffy	Ben Potter	(Ontario) Fleming College
Humber Hawks	Jacob Dobson	Austin Snyder	Noah Garner	Matthew Abrams	Kevin Genjaga	(Ontario) Humber College
Mohawk Mountaineers	Jacob Jones	Eric Just	Joel Matthews	Liam Little	Elias Whittington	(Ontario) Mohawk College
NAIT Ooks	Nicolas Oake	Sean Borkovic	Anthony Ogg	Tyler Brodt	Matt Hannah	Northern Alberta Institute of Technology
SAIT Trojans	Ben Helston	Michael Sharp	Christopher Collings	Jarrett Kress		Southern Alberta Institute of Technology
Sault Cougars	Connor Simms	Evan Bowman	Charles Darling	Avery Berry		(Ontario) Sault College

=== Round robin standings ===
Final Round Robin Standings

Key
Teams to Playoffs

Team	Skip	W	L	PF	PA	EW	EL	BE	SE
(Ontario) Mohawk Mountaineers	Jacob Jones	6	1	60	27	32	18	1	16
(Ontario) Humber Hawks	Jacob Dobson	6	1	60	25	30	17	8	15
(Ontario) Sault Cougars	Connor Simms	5	2	52	43	27	28	2	11
(Alberta) SAIT Trojans	Ben Helston	5	2	55	43	33	24	5	13
(Alberta) Concordia Thunder	Braden Pelech	2	5	40	59	24	31	3	6
(Alberta) NAIT Ooks	Nicolas Oake	2	5	31	49	20	31	7	6
(Alberta) Augustana Vikings	Beau Cornelson	2	5	45	49	27	29	5	9
(Ontario) Fleming Knights	Nolan Galardo	0	7	24	72	18	33	2	4

=== Round robin results ===
All draws are listed in Eastern Time (UTC−04:00).

==== Draw 2 ====
Wednesday, March 15, 9:30 pm

Sheet A	1	2	3	4	5	6	7	8	9	10	Final
(Alberta) SAIT Trojans (Helston)	0	2	1	0	0	0	0	2	0	X	5
(Ontario) Humber Hawks (Dobson)	3	0	0	0	1	1	0	0	3	X	8

Sheet C	1	2	3	4	5	6	7	8	9	10	Final
(Alberta) Concordia Thunder (Pelech)	0	1	0	0	1	0	1	0	0	X	3
(Alberta) NAIT Ooks (Oake)	0	0	0	2	0	3	0	2	1	X	8

Sheet E	1	2	3	4	5	6	7	8	9	10	Final
(Ontario) Fleming Knights (Galardo)	0	1	0	0	1	0	0	2	X	X	4
(Ontario) Mohawk Mountaineers (Jones)	7	0	1	0	0	2	1	0	X	X	11

Sheet F	1	2	3	4	5	6	7	8	9	10	Final
(Ontario) Sault Cougars (Simms)	0	1	0	1	0	0	2	2	0	0	6
(Alberta) Augustana Vikings (Cornelson)	1	0	0	0	2	0	0	0	1	0	4

==== Draw 4 ====
Thursday, March 16, 12:30 pm

Sheet A	1	2	3	4	5	6	7	8	9	10	Final
(Alberta) Concordia Thunder (Pelech)	0	1	3	1	1	3	0	0	2	X	11
(Ontario) Fleming Knights (Galardo)	2	0	0	0	0	0	1	1	0	X	4

Sheet D	1	2	3	4	5	6	7	8	9	10	Final
(Alberta) Augustana Vikings (Cornelson)	0	1	0	1	0	1	0	1	0	X	4
(Ontario) Humber Hawks (Dobson)	2	0	2	0	1	0	1	0	2	X	8

Sheet F	1	2	3	4	5	6	7	8	9	10	Final
(Alberta) NAIT Ooks (Oake)	0	0	1	0	0	0	0	0	X	X	1
(Ontario) Mohawk Mountaineers (Jones)	2	1	0	0	3	0	3	1	X	X	10

Sheet H	1	2	3	4	5	6	7	8	9	10	Final
(Ontario) Sault Cougars (Simms)	0	1	0	2	0	1	0	4	0	X	8
(Alberta) SAIT Trojans (Helston)	0	0	1	0	2	0	3	0	1	X	7

==== Draw 6 ====
Thursday, March 16, 8:30 pm

Sheet B	1	2	3	4	5	6	7	8	9	10	Final
(Ontario) Humber Hawks (Dobson)	4	1	0	4	2	0	0	0	X	X	11
(Ontario) Fleming Knights (Galardo)	0	0	1	0	0	1	0	0	X	X	2

Sheet D	1	2	3	4	5	6	7	8	9	10	Final
(Ontario) Mohawk Mountaineers (Jones)	1	0	2	0	1	0	3	0	0	0	7
(Alberta) SAIT Trojans (Helston)	0	1	0	1	0	0	0	4	1	2	9

Sheet E	1	2	3	4	5	6	7	8	9	10	11	Final
(Alberta) Augustana Vikings (Cornelson)	0	0	1	0	1	1	0	0	3	1	0	7
(Alberta) Concordia Thunder (Pelech)	0	1	0	2	0	0	4	0	0	0	2	9

Sheet G	1	2	3	4	5	6	7	8	9	10	Final
(Alberta) NAIT Ooks (Oake)	0	1	0	1	0	3	1	0	0	X	6
(Ontario) Sault Cougars (Simms)	2	0	4	0	1	0	0	1	1	X	9

==== Draw 8 ====
Friday, March 17, 12:30 pm

Sheet B	1	2	3	4	5	6	7	8	9	10	Final
(Alberta) SAIT Trojans (Helston)	0	1	0	2	1	0	1	2	0	1	8
(Alberta) Concordia Thunder (Pelech)	1	0	1	0	0	1	0	0	3	0	6

Sheet C	1	2	3	4	5	6	7	8	9	10	Final
(Ontario) Fleming Knights (Galardo)	0	0	0	1	1	0	0	0	X	X	2
(Ontario) Sault Cougars (Simms)	1	1	2	0	0	5	3	0	X	X	12

Sheet G	1	2	3	4	5	6	7	8	9	10	Final
(Ontario) Mohawk Mountaineers (Jones)	0	0	0	3	0	1	0	1	0	1	6
(Alberta) Augustana Vikings (Cornelson)	0	1	3	0	1	0	0	0	0	0	5

Sheet H	1	2	3	4	5	6	7	8	9	10	Final
(Ontario) Humber Hawks (Dobson)	0	1	0	2	1	1	3	1	X	X	9
(Alberta) NAIT Ooks (Oake)	0	0	0	0	0	0	0	0	X	X	0

==== Draw 10 ====
Friday, March 17, 8:30 pm

Sheet A	1	2	3	4	5	6	7	8	9	10	Final
(Ontario) Sault Cougars (Simms)	0	0	0	0	0	2	0	2	0	X	4
(Ontario) Mohawk Mountaineers (Jones)	2	1	1	2	1	0	1	0	2	X	10

Sheet B	1	2	3	4	5	6	7	8	9	10	Final
(Alberta) Augustana Vikings (Cornelson)	1	1	0	0	3	1	2	0	X	X	8
(Alberta) NAIT Ooks (Oake)	0	0	0	1	0	0	0	2	X	X	3

Sheet F	1	2	3	4	5	6	7	8	9	10	Final
(Alberta) Concordia Thunder (Pelech)	3	0	0	0	2	0	0	0	X	X	5
(Ontario) Humber Hawks (Dobson)	0	3	1	2	0	0	0	6	X	X	12

Sheet G	1	2	3	4	5	6	7	8	9	10	Final
(Ontario) Fleming Knights (Galardo)	0	0	0	2	0	0	0	1	X	X	3
(Alberta) SAIT Trojans (Helston)	0	2	3	0	0	2	1	0	X	X	8

==== Draw 11 ====
Saturday, March 18, 8:30 am

Sheet C	1	2	3	4	5	6	7	8	9	10	Final
(Ontario) Humber Hawks (Dobson)	0	0	0	0	0	1	0	0	X	X	1
(Ontario) Mohawk Mountaineers (Jones)	2	0	0	0	1	0	1	2	X	X	6

Sheet D	1	2	3	4	5	6	7	8	9	10	Final
(Alberta) Concordia Thunder (Pelech)	0	2	0	0	0	0	0	1	X	X	3
(Ontario) Sault Cougars (Simms)	2	0	1	0	4	1	2	0	X	X	10

Sheet E	1	2	3	4	5	6	7	8	9	10	Final
(Alberta) NAIT Ooks (Oake)	0	0	0	0	2	0	1	1	0	X	4
(Alberta) SAIT Trojans (Helston)	1	1	1	0	0	2	0	0	1	X	6

Sheet H	1	2	3	4	5	6	7	8	9	10	Final
(Alberta) Augustana Vikings (Cornelson)	0	0	5	0	3	1	1	0	X	X	10
(Ontario) Fleming Knights (Galardo)	2	1	0	1	0	0	0	1	X	X	5

==== Draw 13 ====
Saturday, March 18, 4:30 pm

Sheet C	1	2	3	4	5	6	7	8	9	10	Final
(Alberta) SAIT Trojans (Helston)	2	2	0	0	2	2	3	0	1	X	12
(Alberta) Augustana Vikings (Cornelson)	0	0	3	2	0	0	0	2	0	X	7

Sheet D	1	2	3	4	5	6	7	8	9	10	Final
(Alberta) NAIT Ooks (Oake)	2	0	1	2	0	1	1	2	X	X	9
(Ontario) Fleming Knights (Galardo)	0	2	0	0	2	0	0	0	X	X	4

Sheet E	1	2	3	4	5	6	7	8	9	10	Final
(Ontario) Humber Hawks (Dobson)	3	2	1	0	3	1	1	0	X	X	11
(Ontario) Sault Cougars (Simms)	0	0	0	1	0	0	0	2	X	X	3

Sheet H	1	2	3	4	5	6	7	8	9	10	Final
(Ontario) Mohawk Mountaineers (Jones)	1	1	0	5	0	3	0	0	X	X	10
(Alberta) Concordia Thunder (Pelech)	0	0	1	0	1	0	0	1	X	X	3

=== Playoffs ===
Semifinal
1	(Ontario) Mohawk Mountaineers	7
4	(Alberta) SAIT Trojans	10
2	(Ontario) Humber Hawks	8
3	(Ontario) Sault Cougars	4

Final
4	(Alberta) SAIT Trojans	3
2	(Ontario) Humber Hawks	10
Bronze medal game
1	(Ontario) Mohawk Mountaineers	9
3	(Ontario) Sault Cougars	3

==== Semifinals ====
Sunday, March 19, 9:30 am

Sheet B	1	2	3	4	5	6	7	8	9	10	Final
(Ontario) Mohawk Mountaineers (Jones)	0	0	0	2	3	0	0	0	2	X	7
(Alberta) SAIT Trojans (Helston)	2	2	2	0	0	2	1	1	0	X	10

Player percentages
(Ontario) Mohawk Mountaineers		(Alberta) SAIT Trojans	
Liam Little	78%	Jarrett Kress	67%
Joel Matthews	70%	Christopher Collings	53%
Eric Just	63%	Michael Sharp	75%
Jacob Jones	50%	Ben Helston	62%
Total	65%	Total	64%

Sheet G	1	2	3	4	5	6	7	8	9	10	Final
(Ontario) Humber Hawks (Dobson)	0	1	2	0	0	2	0	3	0	X	8
(Ontario) Sault Cougars (Simms)	0	0	0	1	1	0	1	0	1	X	4

Player percentages
(Ontario) Humber Hawks		(Ontario) Sault Cougars	
Matthew Abrams	76%	Avery Berry	79%
Noah Garner	88%	Charles Darling	93%
Austin Snyder	83%	Evan Bowman	75%
Jacob Dobson	79%	Connor Simms	67%
Total	82%	Total	78%

==== Bronze medal game ====
Sunday, March 19, 2:30 pm

Sheet F	1	2	3	4	5	6	7	8	9	10	Final
(Ontario) Mohawk Mountaineers (Jones)	1	1	0	0	2	0	2	0	3	X	9
(Ontario) Sault Cougars (Simms)	0	0	0	1	0	1	0	1	0	X	3

Player percentages
(Ontario) Mohawk Mountaineers		(Ontario) Sault Cougars	
Liam Little	94%	Avery Berry	67%
Joel Matthews	86%	Charles Darling	69%
Eric Just	86%	Evan Bowman	75%
Jacob Jones	83%	Connor Simms	59%
Total	88%	Total	68%

==== Final ====
Sunday, March 19, 2:30 pm

Sheet D	1	2	3	4	5	6	7	8	9	10	Final
(Alberta) SAIT Trojans (Helston)	0	2	0	0	0	0	1	0	X	X	3
(Ontario) Humber Hawks (Dobson)	2	0	0	4	1	2	0	1	X	X	10

Player percentages
(Alberta) SAIT Trojans		(Ontario) Humber Hawks	
Jarrett Kress	63%	Matthew Abrams	88%
Christopher Collings	47%	Noah Garner	78%
Michael Sharp	61%	Austin Snyder	86%
Ben Helston	58%	Jacob Dobson	77%
Total	57%	Total	82%

=== Final standings ===
Place	Team
1st place, gold medalist(s)	(Ontario) Humber Hawks
2nd place, silver medalist(s)	(Alberta) SAIT Trojans
3rd place, bronze medalist(s)	(Ontario) Mohawk Mountaineers
4	(Ontario) Sault Cougars
5	(Alberta) Concordia Thunder
6	(Alberta) NAIT Ooks
7	(Alberta) Augustana Vikings
8	(Ontario) Fleming Knights

== Women ==
=== Teams ===
The teams are listed as follows:

Team	Skip	Third	Second	Lead	Alternate	University
Augustana Vikings	Josie Zimmerman	Bryn Woloshyn	Claire Bevan-Stewart	Darby-Anne Swanson	Hope Zimmerman	(Alberta) Augustana University College
Concordia Thunder	Gabrielle Wood	Payton Sonnenberg	Rachel Jost	Makayla Chamzuk	Kaylee Reed	(Alberta) Concordia University of Edmonton
Fanshawe Falcons	Veronica Van Broekhoven	Nicole McClennan	Leah Hopkins	Abigail Brown	Hannah Schevers	(Ontario) Fanshawe College
Humber Hawks	Meaghan Mallett	Parker Doig	Jessica Byers	Emma Rebel	Daniela Aucoin	(Ontario) Humber College
Niagara Knights	Claire Randell	Melissa Borowski	Alexa Desrochers	Amelia Bender	Emma Hill	(Ontario) Niagara College
Red Deer Polytechnic Queens	Kaylee Raniseth	Cuyler Desormeau	Nicole Homan	Jaycee Bourke		(Alberta) Red Deer Polytechnic
SAIT Trojans	Bayly Scoffin	Sara MacKinnon	Erin McCracken	Julia Fleger		Southern Alberta Institute of Technology
Sault Cougars	Jayna Petingola (Fourth)	Abby Hagger (Skip)	Taylor Pelletier-Cuillerier	Ileana Ramirez Aguilar		(Ontario) Sault College

=== Round robin standings ===
Final Round Robin Standings

Key
Teams to Playoffs

Team	Skip	W	L	PF	PA	EW	EL	BE	SE
(Ontario) Humber Hawks	Meaghan Mallett	6	1	62	27	34	22	1	17
(Ontario) Niagara Knights	Claire Randell	6	1	58	40	32	28	2	11
(Alberta) Concordia Thunder	Gabrielle Wood	5	2	52	37	34	24	3	17
(Alberta) Augustana Vikings	Josie Zimmerman	4	3	64	39	31	25	4	13
(Alberta) Red Deer Polytechnic Queens	Kaylee Raniseth	4	3	68	39	33	27	1	17
(Ontario) Fanshawe Falcons	Veronica Van Broekhoven	2	5	36	60	28	33	2	8
(Alberta) SAIT Trojans	Bayly Scoffin	1	6	44	66	26	36	3	5
(Ontario) Sault Cougars	Abby Hagger	0	7	22	98	17	40	2	3

=== Round robin results ===
All draws are listed in Eastern Time (UTC−04:00).

==== Draw 1 ====
Wednesday, March 15, 5:30 pm

Sheet A	1	2	3	4	5	6	7	8	9	10	Final
(Alberta) Augustana Vikings (Zimmerman)	0	0	2	0	0	0	0	0	0	X	2
(Alberta) Concordia Thunder (Wood)	0	1	0	2	1	0	0	1	1	X	6

Sheet C	1	2	3	4	5	6	7	8	9	10	Final
(Ontario) Humber Hawks (Mallett)	0	0	1	0	2	1	1	0	0	0	5
(Alberta) Red Deer Polytechnic Queens (Raniseth)	0	1	0	1	0	0	0	2	2	1	7

Sheet E	1	2	3	4	5	6	7	8	9	10	Final
(Alberta) SAIT Trojans (Scoffin)	1	0	0	1	0	0	2	0	1	1	6
(Ontario) Niagara Knights (Randell)	0	1	2	0	3	0	0	2	0	0	8

Sheet F	1	2	3	4	5	6	7	8	9	10	Final
(Ontario) Sault Cougars (Hagger)	0	0	1	3	0	0	2	0	0	1	7
(Ontario) Fanshawe Falcons (Van Broekhoven)	2	1	0	0	1	2	0	1	1	0	8

==== Draw 3 ====
Thursday, March 16, 8:30 am

Sheet A	1	2	3	4	5	6	7	8	9	10	Final
(Ontario) Humber Hawks (Mallett)	3	0	2	2	0	0	1	0	1	X	9
(Alberta) SAIT Trojans (Scoffin)	0	2	0	0	1	1	0	1	0	X	5

Sheet D	1	2	3	4	5	6	7	8	9	10	Final
(Ontario) Fanshawe Falcons (Van Broekhoven)	0	1	0	1	1	0	2	0	0	X	5
(Alberta) Concordia Thunder (Wood)	2	0	2	0	0	1	0	2	1	X	8

Sheet F	1	2	3	4	5	6	7	8	9	10	Final
(Alberta) Red Deer Polytechnic Queens (Raniseth)	1	0	2	1	0	2	0	0	0	0	6
(Ontario) Niagara Knights (Randell)	0	1	0	0	1	0	2	1	1	2	8

Sheet H	1	2	3	4	5	6	7	8	9	10	Final
(Ontario) Sault Cougars (Hagger)	0	0	0	0	0	2	0	0	X	X	2
(Alberta) Augustana Vikings (Zimmerman)	1	3	2	3	4	0	4	4	X	X	21

==== Draw 5 ====
Thursday, March 16, 4:30 pm

Sheet B	1	2	3	4	5	6	7	8	9	10	Final
(Alberta) Concordia Thunder (Wood)	1	1	0	2	0	0	1	0	1	1	7
(Alberta) SAIT Trojans (Scoffin)	0	0	2	0	0	3	0	1	0	0	6

Sheet D	1	2	3	4	5	6	7	8	9	10	Final
(Ontario) Niagara Knights (Randell)	0	3	0	0	1	0	1	1	0	2	8
(Alberta) Augustana Vikings (Zimmerman)	1	0	0	2	0	1	0	0	2	0	6

Sheet E	1	2	3	4	5	6	7	8	9	10	Final
(Ontario) Fanshawe Falcons (Van Broekhoven)	0	0	0	1	0	1	0	1	X	X	3
(Ontario) Humber Hawks (Mallett)	2	1	1	0	3	0	2	0	X	X	9

Sheet G	1	2	3	4	5	6	7	8	9	10	Final
(Alberta) Red Deer Polytechnic Queens (Raniseth)	4	1	2	0	5	1	3	4	X	X	20
(Ontario) Sault Cougars (Hagger)	0	0	0	1	0	0	0	0	X	X	1

==== Draw 7 ====
Friday, March 17, 8:30 am

Sheet B	1	2	3	4	5	6	7	8	9	10	Final
(Alberta) Augustana Vikings (Zimmerman)	1	0	1	0	0	0	1	0	1	X	4
(Ontario) Humber Hawks (Mallett)	0	1	0	0	2	0	1	2	0	X	6

Sheet C	1	2	3	4	5	6	7	8	9	10	Final
(Alberta) SAIT Trojans (Scoffin)	2	0	0	1	0	2	0	0	0	2	7
(Ontario) Sault Cougars (Hagger)	0	1	0	0	1	0	0	1	1	0	4

Sheet G	1	2	3	4	5	6	7	8	9	10	Final
(Ontario) Niagara Knights (Randell)	0	0	2	0	4	0	1	1	X	X	8
(Ontario) Fanshawe Falcons (Van Broekhoven)	0	1	0	0	0	1	0	0	X	X	2

Sheet H	1	2	3	4	5	6	7	8	9	10	Final
(Alberta) Concordia Thunder (Wood)	1	0	2	2	1	0	4	0	1	X	11
(Alberta) Red Deer Polytechnic Queens (Raniseth)	0	1	0	0	0	1	0	5	0	X	7

==== Draw 9 ====
Friday, March 17, 4:30 pm

Sheet A	1	2	3	4	5	6	7	8	9	10	Final
(Ontario) Sault Cougars (Hagger)	0	1	0	1	1	0	1	0	X	X	4
(Ontario) Niagara Knights (Randell)	5	0	6	0	0	1	0	2	X	X	14

Sheet B	1	2	3	4	5	6	7	8	9	10	Final
(Ontario) Fanshawe Falcons (Van Broekhoven)	0	0	1	0	1	0	0	0	X	X	2
(Alberta) Red Deer Polytechnic Queens (Raniseth)	2	1	0	2	0	4	1	1	X	X	11

Sheet F	1	2	3	4	5	6	7	8	9	10	Final
(Ontario) Humber Hawks (Mallett)	0	0	1	1	2	1	0	2	0	X	7
(Alberta) Concordia Thunder (Wood)	1	1	0	0	0	0	0	0	0	X	2

Sheet G	1	2	3	4	5	6	7	8	9	10	Final
(Alberta) SAIT Trojans (Scoffin)	0	0	4	0	0	3	0	1	X	X	8
(Alberta) Augustana Vikings (Zimmerman)	2	2	0	2	3	0	5	0	X	X	14

==== Draw 12 ====
Saturday, March 18, 12:30 pm

Sheet C	1	2	3	4	5	6	7	8	9	10	Final
(Alberta) Concordia Thunder (Wood)	0	1	2	1	0	2	0	0	0	0	6
(Ontario) Niagara Knights (Randell)	2	0	0	0	1	0	1	1	1	1	7

Sheet D	1	2	3	4	5	6	7	8	9	10	Final
(Ontario) Humber Hawks (Mallett)	4	0	3	4	1	2	2	0	X	X	16
(Ontario) Sault Cougars (Hagger)	0	1	0	0	0	0	0	0	X	X	1

Sheet E	1	2	3	4	5	6	7	8	9	10	Final
(Alberta) Red Deer Polytechnic Queens (Raniseth)	0	0	0	3	0	0	1	0	X	X	4
(Alberta) Augustana Vikings (Zimmerman)	2	2	1	0	1	1	0	3	X	X	10

Sheet H	1	2	3	4	5	6	7	8	9	10	11	Final
(Ontario) Fanshawe Falcons (Van Broekhoven)	0	1	3	0	1	0	1	0	0	4	1	11
(Alberta) SAIT Trojans (Scoffin)	2	0	0	3	0	2	0	2	1	0	0	10

==== Draw 14 ====
Saturday, March 18, 8:30 pm

Sheet C	1	2	3	4	5	6	7	8	9	10	Final
(Alberta) Augustana Vikings (Zimmerman)	0	3	2	0	0	0	1	0	0	1	7
(Ontario) Fanshawe Falcons (Van Broekhoven)	1	0	0	1	0	1	0	1	1	0	5

Sheet D	1	2	3	4	5	6	7	8	9	10	Final
(Alberta) Red Deer Polytechnic Queens (Raniseth)	5	1	2	1	0	1	0	3	X	X	13
(Alberta) SAIT Trojans (Scoffin)	0	0	0	0	1	0	1	0	X	X	2

Sheet E	1	2	3	4	5	6	7	8	9	10	Final
(Alberta) Concordia Thunder (Wood)	3	0	2	2	0	3	1	1	X	X	12
(Ontario) Sault Cougars (Hagger)	0	1	0	0	2	0	0	0	X	X	3

Sheet H	1	2	3	4	5	6	7	8	9	10	Final
(Ontario) Niagara Knights (Randell)	1	0	0	0	2	0	0	0	2	0	5
(Ontario) Humber Hawks (Mallett)	0	2	0	1	0	1	0	1	0	5	10

=== Playoffs ===
Semifinal
1	(Ontario) Humber Hawks	5
4	(Alberta) Augustana Vikings	11
2	(Ontario) Niagara Knights	7
3	(Alberta) Concordia Thunder	6

Final
4	(Alberta) Augustana Vikings	5
2	(Ontario) Niagara Knights	4
Bronze medal game
1	(Ontario) Humber Hawks	4
3	(Alberta) Concordia Thunder	8

==== Semifinals ====
Sunday, March 19, 9:30 am

Sheet A	1	2	3	4	5	6	7	8	9	10	Final
(Ontario) Humber Hawks (Mallett)	1	0	1	0	0	1	0	2	0	X	5
(Alberta) Augustana Vikings (Zimmerman)	0	4	0	1	1	0	3	0	2	X	11

Player percentages
(Ontario) Humber Hawks		(Alberta) Augustana Vikings	
Emma Rebel	72%	Darby-Anne Swanson	67%
Jessica Byers	74%	Claire Bevan-Stewart	64%
Parker Doig	60%	Bryn Woloshyn	60%
Meaghan Mallett	63%	Josie Zimmerman	75%
Total	67%	Total	66%

Sheet D	1	2	3	4	5	6	7	8	9	10	Final
(Ontario) Niagara Knights (Randell)	0	3	1	0	1	0	2	0	0	X	7
(Alberta) Concordia Thunder (Wood)	0	0	0	3	0	1	0	1	1	X	6

Player percentages
(Ontario) Niagara Knights		(Alberta) Concordia Thunder	
Amelia Bender	89%	Makayla Chamzuk	69%
Alexa Desrochers	79%	Rachel Jost	78%
Melissa Borowski	75%	Payton Sonnenberg	81%
Claire Randell	84%	Gabrielle Wood	75%
Total	82%	Total	76%

==== Bronze medal game ====
Sunday, March 19, 2:30 pm

Sheet H	1	2	3	4	5	6	7	8	9	10	Final
(Ontario) Humber Hawks (Mallett)	1	0	0	1	0	2	0	0	0	X	4
(Alberta) Concordia Thunder (Wood)	0	0	0	0	3	0	0	4	1	X	8

Player percentages
(Ontario) Humber Hawks		(Alberta) Concordia Thunder	
Emma Rebel	78%	Makayla Chamzuk	56%
Jessica Byers	71%	Rachel Jost	65%
Parker Doig	60%	Payton Sonnenberg	75%
Meaghan Mallett	74%	Gabrielle Wood	86%
Total	71%	Total	70%

==== Final ====
Sunday, March 19, 2:30 pm

Sheet B	1	2	3	4	5	6	7	8	9	10	Final
(Alberta) Augustana Vikings (Zimmerman)	0	0	0	1	1	1	0	0	1	1	5
(Ontario) Niagara Knights (Randell)	2	0	0	0	0	0	1	1	0	0	4

Player percentages
(Alberta) Augustana Vikings		(Ontario) Niagara Knights	
Darby-Anne Swanson	68%	Amelia Bender	56%
Claire Bevan-Stewart	60%	Alexa Desrochers	63%
Bryn Woloshyn	55%	Melissa Borowski	61%
Josie Zimmerman	43%	Claire Randell	54%
Total	57%	Total	58%

=== Final standings ===
Place	Team
1st place, gold medalist(s)	(Alberta) Augustana Vikings
2nd place, silver medalist(s)	(Ontario) Niagara Knights
3rd place, bronze medalist(s)	(Alberta) Concordia Thunder
4	(Ontario) Humber Hawks
5	(Alberta) Red Deer Polytechnic Queens
6	(Ontario) Fanshawe Falcons
7	(Alberta) SAIT Trojans
8	(Ontario) Sault Cougars
