= 2023 PointsBet Invitational =

Curling tournament

- Host city: Oakville, Ontario
- Arena: Sixteen Mile Sports Complex
- Dates: September 27 – October 1
- Men's winner: (Manitoba) Team Carruthers
- Curling club: Morris CC, Morris
- Skip: Reid Carruthers
- Third: Brad Jacobs
- Second: Derek Samagalski
- Lead: Connor Njegovan
- Coach: Rob Meakin
- Finalist: (Manitoba) Matt Dunstone
- Women's winner: (Ontario) Team Homan
- Curling club: Ottawa CC, Ottawa
- Skip: Rachel Homan
- Third: Tracy Fleury
- Second: Emma Miskew
- Lead: Sarah Wilkes
- Coach: Don Bartlett
- Finalist: (Manitoba) Kerri Einarson

The 2023 PointsBet Invitational curling tournament was held from September 27 to October 1 at the Sixteen Mile Sports Complex in Oakville, Ontario. The event featured thirty-two Canadian teams and was the first major event of the 2023–24 season. It was played in a single-elimination tournament with the winning team on both the men's and women's sides receiving $50,000 each.

== Qualification ==
The top 10 ranked men's and women's 2022–23 CTRS standings qualified for the event first. The 2023 Ontario men's and women's champions also qualified. Additionally, the reigning men's and women's champions of the 2023 Canadian Junior Curling Championships, the 2023 CCAA/Curling Canada College Curling Championships, the 2023 U Sports/Curling Canada University Curling Championships, the 2023 U25 NextGen Classic and the 2022 Canadian Curling Club Championships received a berth to round out the field.

=== Men ===
Top CTRS men's teams:

1. (Newfoundland and Labrador) Brad Gushue
2. (Alberta) Brendan Bottcher
3. (Manitoba) Matt Dunstone
4. (Alberta) Kevin Koe
5. (Manitoba) Reid Carruthers
6. (Alberta) Karsten Sturmay
7. (Alberta) Aaron Sluchinski
8. (Ontario) ~~Mike McEwen~~
9. (Ontario) John Epping
10. (Ontario) ~~Tanner Horgan~~
11. (Manitoba) Ryan Wiebe
12. (Saskatchewan) Colton Flasch

Ontario champions:

- (Ontario) ~~Mike McEwen~~
- (Ontario) Glenn Howard

Junior champions:

- (Alberta) Johnson Tao

CCAA champions:

- (Ontario) Jacob Dobson

U Sport champions:

- (Ontario) Sam Mooibroek

U25 NextGen champions:

- (Saskatchewan) Rylan Kleiter

Club champions:

- (Ontario) Greg Balsdon

=== Women ===
Top CTRS women's teams:

1. (Manitoba) Kerri Einarson
2. (Ontario) Rachel Homan
3. (Manitoba) Jennifer Jones
4. (Manitoba) Kaitlyn Lawes
5. (British Columbia) Clancy Grandy
6. (Alberta) ~~Casey Scheidegger~~
7. (Manitoba) ~~Meghan Walter~~
8. (Nova Scotia) Christina Black
9. (Ontario) Isabelle Ladouceur
10. (Alberta) Kayla Skrlik
11. (Ontario) Danielle Inglis
12. (New Brunswick) ~~Andrea Kelly~~
13. (Alberta) ~~Serena Gray-Withers~~
14. (Saskatchewan) Nancy Martin

Ontario champions:

- (Ontario) ~~Rachel Homan~~
- (Ontario) Hollie Duncan

Junior champions:

- (Alberta) Myla Plett

CCAA champions:

- (Alberta) Josie Zimmerman

U Sport champions:

- (Alberta) Serena Gray-Withers

U25 NextGen champions:

- (Alberta) ~~Serena Gray-Withers~~
- (Alberta) Abby Marks

Club champions:

- (New Brunswick) Shaelyn Park

== Men ==
=== Teams ===
The teams are listed as follows:

Skip	Third	Second	Lead	Alternate	Locale
Greg Balsdon	Jordan Keon	Curtis Samoy	Trevor Talbott		Richmond Hill, Ontario
Brendan Bottcher	Marc Kennedy	Brett Gallant	Ben Hebert		Calgary, Alberta
Reid Carruthers	Brad Jacobs	Derek Samagalski	Connor Njegovan		Winnipeg, Manitoba
Jacob Dobson	Austin Snyder	Noah Garner	Matthew Abrams	Kevin Genjaga	Toronto, Ontario
Matt Dunstone	B. J. Neufeld	Colton Lott	Ryan Harnden		Winnipeg, Manitoba
John Epping	Mat Camm	Pat Janssen	Jason Camm		East York, Toronto, Ontario
Brad Gushue	Mark Nichols	E. J. Harnden	Geoff Walker		St. John's, Newfoundland and Labrador
Scott Howard (Fourth)	Glenn Howard (Skip)	David Mathers	Tim March		Penetanguishene, Ontario
Rylan Kleiter	Joshua Mattern	Matthew Hall	Trevor Johnson		Saskatoon, Saskatchewan
Kevin Koe	Tyler Tardi	Jacques Gauthier	Karrick Martin		Calgary, Alberta
Mike McEwen	Colton Flasch	Kevin Marsh	Dan Marsh		Saskatoon, Saskatchewan
Sam Mooibroek	Kibo Mulima	Wyatt Small	Ben Pearce	Codie Harris	Waterloo, Ontario
Aaron Sluchinski	Jeremy Harty	Kerr Drummond	Dylan Webster		Airdrie, Alberta
Karsten Sturmay	Kyle Doering	Glenn Venance	Kurtis Goller	J. D. Lind	St. Albert, Alberta
Johnson Tao	Jaedon Neuert	Zach Davies	Adam Naugler		Edmonton, Alberta
Ryan Wiebe	Ty Dilello	Sean Flatt	Adam Flatt		Winnipeg, Manitoba

=== Knockout Brackets ===
Sweep 16
1	(Newfoundland and Labrador) Brad Gushue	9
16	(Ontario) Greg Balsdon	4
8	(Ontario) John Epping	5
9	(Manitoba) Ryan Wiebe	8
5	(Manitoba) Reid Carruthers	10
12	(Alberta) Johnson Tao	3
4	(Alberta) Kevin Koe	6
13	(Saskatchewan) Rylan Kleiter	10
6	(Alberta) Karsten Sturmay	8
11	(Ontario) Glenn Howard	4
3	(Manitoba) Matt Dunstone	10
14	(Ontario) Sam Mooibroek	5
7	(Alberta) Aaron Sluchinski	5
10	(Saskatchewan) Mike McEwen	11
2	(Alberta) Brendan Bottcher	7
15	(Ontario) Jacob Dobson	1

Elite 8
1	(Newfoundland and Labrador) Brad Gushue	8
9	(Manitoba) Ryan Wiebe	4
5	(Manitoba) Reid Carruthers	9
13	(Saskatchewan) Rylan Kleiter	8
6	(Alberta) Karsten Sturmay	5
3	(Manitoba) Matt Dunstone	8
10	(Saskatchewan) Mike McEwen	9
2	(Alberta) Brendan Bottcher	5

Final 4
1	(Newfoundland and Labrador) Brad Gushue	5
5	(Manitoba) Reid Carruthers	6
3	(Manitoba) Matt Dunstone	6
10	(Saskatchewan) Mike McEwen	5

Final
5	(Manitoba) Reid Carruthers	9
3	(Manitoba) Matt Dunstone	8

=== Knockout Results ===
All draw times listed in Eastern Time (UTC-04:00).

==== Sweep 16 ====
Wednesday, September 27, 7:00 pm

Sheet A	1	2	3	4	5	6	7	8	9	10	Final
(Alberta) Kevin Koe 🔨	0	3	0	2	0	0	1	0	0	0	6
(Saskatchewan) Rylan Kleiter	1	0	3	0	0	1	0	2	2	1	10

Sheet B	1	2	3	4	5	6	7	8	9	10	Final
(Manitoba) Reid Carruthers 🔨	2	3	1	0	1	0	3	0	X	X	10
(Alberta) Johnson Tao	0	0	0	0	0	1	0	2	X	X	3

Sheet C	1	2	3	4	5	6	7	8	9	10	Final
(Newfoundland and Labrador) Brad Gushue 🔨	2	0	2	1	1	0	1	0	2	X	9
(Ontario) Greg Balsdon	0	1	0	0	0	2	0	1	0	X	4

Sheet D	1	2	3	4	5	6	7	8	9	10	Final
(Ontario) John Epping 🔨	3	0	0	2	0	0	0	0	0	0	5
(Manitoba) Ryan Wiebe	0	1	1	0	2	1	0	2	0	1	8

Thursday, September 28, 7:00 pm

Sheet A	1	2	3	4	5	6	7	8	9	10	Final
(Alberta) Karsten Sturmay	0	1	0	2	0	0	5	0	X	X	8
(Ontario) Glenn Howard 🔨	0	0	2	0	1	0	0	1	X	X	4

Sheet B	1	2	3	4	5	6	7	8	9	10	Final
(Manitoba) Matt Dunstone	0	3	1	0	2	0	2	0	2	X	10
(Ontario) Sam Mooibroek 🔨	1	0	0	2	0	1	0	1	0	X	5

Sheet C	1	2	3	4	5	6	7	8	9	10	Final
(Alberta) Brendan Bottcher	0	1	1	2	0	2	0	1	X	X	7
(Ontario) Jacob Dobson 🔨	0	0	0	0	1	0	0	0	X	X	1

Sheet D	1	2	3	4	5	6	7	8	9	10	Final
(Alberta) Aaron Sluchinski	0	0	3	0	0	0	2	0	X	X	5
(Saskatchewan) Mike McEwen 🔨	2	1	0	1	1	3	0	3	X	X	11

==== Elite 8 ====
Friday, September 29, 4:30 pm

Sheet A	1	2	3	4	5	6	7	8	9	10	Final
(Saskatchewan) Mike McEwen 🔨	3	0	0	0	2	0	3	0	1	X	9
(Alberta) Brendan Bottcher	0	1	0	1	0	1	0	2	0	X	5

Sheet B	1	2	3	4	5	6	7	8	9	10	Final
(Newfoundland and Labrador) Brad Gushue 🔨	2	0	1	0	1	0	0	0	4	X	8
(Manitoba) Ryan Wiebe	0	1	0	0	0	0	3	0	0	X	4

Sheet C	1	2	3	4	5	6	7	8	9	10	Final
(Alberta) Karsten Sturmay 🔨	0	3	0	1	0	0	1	0	0	0	5
(Manitoba) Matt Dunstone	1	0	2	0	1	0	0	1	1	2	8

Sheet D	1	2	3	4	5	6	7	8	9	10	Final
(Manitoba) Reid Carruthers 🔨	0	3	0	3	0	0	1	0	1	1	9
(Saskatchewan) Rylan Kleiter	0	0	3	0	1	1	0	3	0	0	8

==== Final 4 ====
Saturday, September 30, 5:00 pm

Sheet B	1	2	3	4	5	6	7	8	9	10	11	Final
(Manitoba) Matt Dunstone 🔨	1	0	1	1	0	1	0	1	0	0	1	6
(Saskatchewan) Mike McEwen	0	2	0	0	1	0	0	0	1	1	0	5

Sheet C	1	2	3	4	5	6	7	8	9	10	11	Final
(Newfoundland and Labrador) Brad Gushue 🔨	0	0	2	0	1	0	1	0	1	0	0	5
(Manitoba) Reid Carruthers	0	0	0	1	0	2	0	1	0	1	1	6

==== Final ====
Sunday, October 1, 5:00 pm

Sheet B	1	2	3	4	5	6	7	8	9	10	11	Final
(Manitoba) Reid Carruthers 🔨	1	0	0	0	2	0	2	0	0	3	1	9
(Manitoba) Matt Dunstone	0	2	1	1	0	2	0	2	0	0	0	8

Player percentages
(Manitoba) Team Carruthers		(Manitoba) Team Dunstone	
Connor Njegovan	94%	Ryan Harnden	95%
Derek Samagalski	94%	Colton Lott	99%
Brad Jacobs	86%	B. J. Neufeld	88%
Reid Carruthers	85%	Matt Dunstone	88%
Total	90%	Total	92%

== Women ==
=== Teams ===
The teams are listed as follows:

Skip	Third	Second	Lead	Alternate	Locale
Christina Black	Jenn Baxter	Karlee Everist	Shelley Barker		Dartmouth, Nova Scotia
Hollie Duncan	Megan Balsdon	Rachelle Strybosch	Tess Guyatt	Julie Tippin	Woodstock, Ontario
Kerri Einarson	Val Sweeting	Shannon Birchard	Briane Harris		Gimli, Manitoba
Clancy Grandy	Kayla MacMillan	Lindsay Dubue	Rachelle Brown (Note: Rachelle Brown spared for Sarah Loken.)		Vancouver, British Columbia
Serena Gray-Withers	Catherine Clifford	Brianna Cullen	Zoe Cinnamon	Gracelyn Richards	Edmonton, Alberta
Rachel Homan	Tracy Fleury	Emma Miskew	Sarah Wilkes		Ottawa, Ontario
Danielle Inglis	Kira Brunton	Calissa Daly	Cassandra de Groot		Ottawa, Ontario
Jennifer Jones	Karlee Burgess	Emily Zacharias	Lauren Lenentine		Winnipeg & Altona, Manitoba
Isabelle Ladouceur	Grace Lloyd	Jamie Smith	Rachel Steele		Whitby, Ontario
Kaitlyn Lawes	Selena Njegovan	Jocelyn Peterman	Kristin MacCuish		Winnipeg, Manitoba
Abby Marks	Elysa Crough	Kim Bonneau	Julianna Mackenzie		Edmonton, Alberta
Nancy Martin	Lindsay Bertsch	Madison Kleiter	Krysten Karwacki		Martensville, Saskatchewan
Shaelyn Park	Krista Flanagan	Lynn LeBlanc	Shannon Tatlock		Moncton, New Brunswick
Myla Plett	Alyssa Nedohin	Chloe Fediuk	Allie Iskiw		Airdrie & Sherwood Park, Alberta
Kayla Skrlik	Brittany Tran	Geri-Lynn Ramsay	Ashton Skrlik		Calgary, Alberta
Josie Zimmerman	Bryn Woloshyn	Claire Bevan-Stewart	Darby-Anne Swanson	Hope Zimmerman	Camrose, Alberta

=== Knockout Brackets ===
Sweep 16
1	(Manitoba) Kerri Einarson	15
16	(Alberta) Josie Zimmerman	3
8	(Alberta) Kayla Skrlik	7
9	(Ontario) Danielle Inglis	6
5	(British Columbia) Clancy Grandy	6
12	(Ontario) Hollie Duncan	5
4	(Manitoba) Kaitlyn Lawes	11
13	(Alberta) Abby Marks	5
6	(Nova Scotia) Christina Black	8
11	(Saskatchewan) Nancy Martin	7
3	(Manitoba) Jennifer Jones	10
14	(Alberta) Myla Plett	6
7	(Ontario) Isabelle Ladouceur	8
10	(Alberta) Serena Gray-Withers	6
2	(Ontario) Rachel Homan	11
15	(New Brunswick) Shaelyn Park	1

Elite 8
1	(Manitoba) Kerri Einarson	10
8	(Alberta) Kayla Skrlik	6
5	(British Columbia) Clancy Grandy	3
4	(Manitoba) Kaitlyn Lawes	8
6	(Nova Scotia) Christina Black	9
3	(Manitoba) Jennifer Jones	6
7	(Ontario) Isabelle Ladouceur	6
2	(Ontario) Rachel Homan	10

Final 4
1	(Manitoba) Kerri Einarson	8
4	(Manitoba) Kaitlyn Lawes	3
6	(Nova Scotia) Christina Black	5
2	(Ontario) Rachel Homan	10

Final
1	(Manitoba) Kerri Einarson	7
2	(Ontario) Rachel Homan	9

=== Knockout Results ===
All draw times listed in Eastern Time (UTC-04:00).

==== Sweep 16 ====
Wednesday, September 27, 2:00 pm

Sheet A	1	2	3	4	5	6	7	8	9	10	Final
(Manitoba) Kaitlyn Lawes	3	0	4	1	0	0	0	3	X	X	11
(Alberta) Abby Marks 🔨	0	1	0	0	1	1	2	0	X	X	5

Sheet B	1	2	3	4	5	6	7	8	9	10	11	Final
(British Columbia) Clancy Grandy 🔨	1	0	0	1	1	0	1	0	1	0	1	6
(Ontario) Hollie Duncan	0	1	0	0	0	1	0	2	0	1	0	5

Sheet C	1	2	3	4	5	6	7	8	9	10	Final
(Manitoba) Kerri Einarson 🔨	1	4	0	2	0	6	2	0	X	X	15
(Alberta) Josie Zimmerman	0	0	1	0	1	0	0	1	X	X	3

Sheet D	1	2	3	4	5	6	7	8	9	10	Final
(Alberta) Kayla Skrlik	0	0	0	2	0	2	1	0	0	2	7
(Ontario) Danielle Inglis 🔨	0	3	1	0	1	0	0	0	1	0	6

Thursday, September 28, 2:00 pm

Sheet A	1	2	3	4	5	6	7	8	9	10	Final
(Nova Scotia) Christina Black 🔨	2	0	1	0	1	1	0	1	0	2	8
(Saskatchewan) Nancy Martin	0	1	0	2	0	0	2	0	2	0	7

Sheet B	1	2	3	4	5	6	7	8	9	10	Final
(Manitoba) Jennifer Jones 🔨	2	0	1	0	2	0	3	0	2	X	10
(Alberta) Myla Plett	0	2	0	1	0	1	0	2	0	X	6

Sheet C	1	2	3	4	5	6	7	8	9	10	Final
(Ontario) Rachel Homan 🔨	2	1	1	0	2	2	2	1	X	X	11
(New Brunswick) Shaelyn Park	0	0	0	1	0	0	0	0	X	X	1

Sheet D	1	2	3	4	5	6	7	8	9	10	Final
(Ontario) Isabelle Ladouceur 🔨	0	2	1	1	0	0	3	0	0	1	8
(Alberta) Serena Gray-Withers	0	0	0	0	2	1	0	2	1	0	6

==== Elite 8 ====
Friday, September 29, 11:30 am

Sheet A	1	2	3	4	5	6	7	8	9	10	Final
(Ontario) Isabelle Ladouceur	0	2	0	2	0	0	2	0	0	X	6
(Ontario) Rachel Homan 🔨	2	0	1	0	1	2	0	3	1	X	10

Sheet B	1	2	3	4	5	6	7	8	9	10	Final
(Manitoba) Kerri Einarson	1	1	0	2	0	0	0	2	2	2	10
(Alberta) Kayla Skrlik 🔨	0	0	2	0	1	1	2	0	0	0	6

Sheet C	1	2	3	4	5	6	7	8	9	10	Final
(Nova Scotia) Christina Black 🔨	2	0	1	0	2	0	0	2	0	2	9
(Manitoba) Jennifer Jones	0	2	0	2	0	2	0	0	0	0	6

Sheet D	1	2	3	4	5	6	7	8	9	10	Final
(British Columbia) Clancy Grandy	0	0	1	0	1	0	1	0	X	X	3
(Manitoba) Kaitlyn Lawes 🔨	2	2	0	2	0	1	0	1	X	X	8

==== Final 4 ====
Saturday, September 30, 12:00 pm

Sheet B	1	2	3	4	5	6	7	8	9	10	Final
(Nova Scotia) Christina Black 🔨	1	0	2	0	1	0	1	0	X	X	5
(Ontario) Rachel Homan	0	4	0	3	0	1	0	2	X	X	10

Sheet C	1	2	3	4	5	6	7	8	9	10	Final
(Manitoba) Kerri Einarson	0	1	1	1	1	0	2	1	1	X	8
(Manitoba) Kaitlyn Lawes 🔨	2	0	0	0	0	1	0	0	0	X	3

==== Final ====
Sunday, October 1, 12:00 pm

Sheet B	1	2	3	4	5	6	7	8	9	10	Final
(Manitoba) Kerri Einarson	0	3	0	1	0	0	0	2	0	1	7
(Ontario) Rachel Homan 🔨	0	0	2	0	3	0	1	0	3	0	9

Player percentages
(Manitoba) Team Einarson		(Ontario) Team Homan	
Briane Harris	89%	Sarah Wilkes	88%
Shannon Birchard	84%	Emma Miskew	79%
Val Sweeting	81%	Tracy Fleury	88%
Kerri Einarson	61%	Rachel Homan	84%
Total	79%	Total	84%
