= Jacob Jones (curler) =

Canadian curler

- Curler
- Born: September 14, 2001 (age 25); Brantford, Ontario

Team
- Skip: Weston Oryniak
- Third: Jacob Jones
- Second: Noah Garner
- Lead: Matthew Arbams

Curling career
- Member Association: Ontario

Jacob Jones (born September 14, 2001) is a Canadian curler from Brantford, Ontario. He is a former Canadian junior champion.

== Curling career ==
=== Juniors ===
Jones began curling at age 7 at the Brant Curling Club.

In 2020, Jones' Mohawk College rink qualified for the CCAA/Curling Canada College Curling Championships, and his team U18 team also qualified for the Canadian U18 Curling Championships. This caused a conflict as they were being held at the same time, though the Mohawk team would not have been able to play due to a lack of players. Both events were cancelled due to the COVID-19 pandemic in Ontario. At the end of the season, he was named the college's male athlete of the year.

Jones played in the 2021 World Junior Qualification Event, which replaced the Canadian Junior Curling Championships that season, as they were cancelled due to the pandemic. Jones was the alternate on team Ontario, skipped by Scott Mitchell. The team finished with a 4–2 record.

Jones won a provincial college title in February 2022, skipping his Mohawk College rink, the college's first title since 1998. They beat the undefeated Humber College team in the final. Jones was named the tournament's most valuable player, wand was named the college's athlete of the week. Just weeks later, he won the Ontario U-21 Curling Championships, playing for the Landan Rooney rink. Team Rooney represented Ontario at the 2022 Canadian Junior Curling Championships, which were played in Stratford, Ontario, only 85 kilometres away from Jones' hometown. The team beat Alberta's Johnson Tao in the final. The Rooney rink had just formed in December 2021 prior to that season's provincial junior championship. They finished the Canadian Juniors Round-Robin with a 7–1 record, and then won all three of their playoff games to win the Championships. At the end of the 2021–22 curling season, Jones won Mohawk College's Outstanding Male Athlete of the Year award for the second time.

As 2022 Canadian junior champions, the Rooney team represented Canada at the 2023 World Junior Curling Championships, where they finished with a 3–6 record, relegating Canada to the "B" championship for 2024. Weeks later, Jones skipped Mohawk College at the 2023 CCAA/Curling Canada College Curling Championships. The team finished the round robin with a 6–1 record, tied for first place. In the playoffs they lost to the Southern Alberta Institute of Technology in the semifinal, but won the bronze medal against Sault College.

=== Men's ===
As 2022 national junior champions, the Rooney rink was invited to compete in the inaugural 2022 PointsBet Invitational tournament put on by Curling Canada. The team lost in the first round of the single-elimination tournament to Brendan Bottcher, 11–3. Later that season the team qualified for the 2023 Ontario Tankard by defeating Mike McEwen in one of the A finals of the Tankard Open Qualifier. At the Ontario Tankard, the team went 1–4 in pool play, missing the playoffs.

For the 2023–24 curling season, Jones joined the Christopher Inglis rink, throwing the last rocks on the team. As a member of Team Inglis, he qualified for the 2024 Ontario Tankard.

== Personal life ==
Jones' twin brother is fellow curler Ben Jones. He attended North Park Collegiate and Vocational School before attending Mohawk College, where he took architectural technology.
