= OCAD (disambiguation) =

OCAD can refer to:

- Ontario College of Art & Design University in Toronto, Ontario, Canada
- OCAD, software for drawing maps; see Orienteering map
- Oklahoma City Air Depot; see Tinker Air Force Base
- Ontario College Advanced Diploma
- OCAD Orgaan voor de Coördinatie en de Analyse van de Dreiging
