= Augustana Vikings =

Augustana Vikings may refer to:

- Augustana (Illinois) Vikings, the sports teams of Augustana College in Rock Island, Illinois
- Augustana (South Dakota) Vikings, the sports teams of Augustana University in Sioux Falls, South Dakota
- The sports teams of Augustana University College in Alberta, Canada
