= Mississauga Campus =

Mississauga Campus may refer to:

- University of Toronto Mississauga
- Hazel McCallion Campus (Sheridan College)
- Mississauga Campus (Mohawk College)
