= Annette Hamm =

Canadian retired news anchor and reporter

Annette Hamm (pronounced Haum) is a Canadian retired news anchor and reporter. She is best known for co-hosting Morning Live, a three-hour morning show that aired on CHCH-TV in Hamilton, Ontario weekdays from 6 am to 9 am, which she co-hosted from 2005 until her retirement in June 2026.

== Biography ==
Hamm grew up on a tobacco farm outside of Langton, Ontario.

Hamm has been at CHCH since 1986. She graduated from the Mohawk College Broadcast Journalism program in 1987. Before being named Morning Live co-host in 2005, Hamm was the station's crime reporter and a backup news anchor. She has also covered general assignment and the environmental beat for the station. She previously co-anchored the Noon News before it was cancelled.

In March 2026, CHCH announced that Hamm would retire in June 2026 after 40 years with the station. Hamm presented her final edition of Morning Live on 19 June 2026 and retired from CHCH later that month. As part of its coverage of her final show, CHCH stated that Hamm would remain involved with the station through a podcast and a recurring book segment on Morning Live beginning in the fall of 2026.

== Awards and honours ==
Hamm was named a 2015 Woman of Distinction (Public Affairs).
