= 2023 U Sports/Curling Canada University Curling Championships =

2023 U Sports/Curling Canada Championships
- Host city: Sudbury, Ontario
- Arena: Gerry McCrory Countryside Sports Complex
- Dates: March 15–19
- Men's winner: (Ontario) Wilfrid Laurier Golden Hawks
- Skip: Sam Mooibroek
- Third: Kibo Mulima
- Second: Wyatt Small
- Lead: Ben Pearce
- Alternate: Codie Harris
- Coach: Matt Wilkinson
- Finalist: (Nova Scotia) Dalhousie Tigers (McEachren)
- Women's winner: Alberta Pandas
- Skip: Serena Gray-Withers
- Third: Catherine Clifford
- Second: Brianna Cullen
- Lead: Zoe Cinnamon
- Alternate: Gracelyn Richards
- Coach: Amanda St. Laurent
- Finalist: (Nova Scotia) Dalhousie Tigers (Callaghan)

The 2023 U Sports/Curling Canada University Championships were held from March 15 to 19 at the Gerry McCrory Countryside Sports Complex in Sudbury, Ontario. The host university of the event was Laurentian University. Sudbury was originally scheduled to host the 2022 edition of the event, however, it was cancelled due to the COVID-19 pandemic in Ontario. The event was held in conjunction with the 2023 CCAA/Curling Canada College Curling Championships, the Canadian college curling championship.

On the men's side, the Wilfrid Laurier Golden Hawks defended their title with a 9–7 victory over the Dalhousie Tigers in the championship game. The team, skipped by Sam Mooibroek, finished the round robin in first place with a 6–1 record. They then defeated Queen's Golden Gaels 12–10 in the semifinal to qualify for the championship game. The Dalhousie Tigers, led by Adam McEachren, finished second in the round robin with a 5–2 record before stealing their way into the championship game with 5–4 win over the Laurentian Voyageurs. In the bronze medal game, the Queen's Golden Gaels, skipped by Owen Purdy, took one in the tenth end to defeat the Laurentian Voyageurs, led by Jake Horgan.

The women's event also saw a successful title defense with the Alberta Pandas stealing one in the tenth end to defeat the Dalhousie Tigers 5–4. The Alberta team, skipped by Serena Gray-Withers, finished third in the round robin with a 4–3 record. They then eliminated the Memorial Sea-Hawks in the semifinal thanks to a five ender in the eighth, leading to their 7–6 victory. For the Tigers, led by Marin Callaghan, they also went 4–3 through the round robin, however, upset the number one seeded Laurentian Voyageurs 10–6 in the semifinal to earn a spot in the championship game. The Laurentian rink, led by Bella Croisier, bounced back with a 6–5 win over the Memorial Sea-Hawks, skipped by Mackenzie Mitchell, to claim the bronze medal.

== Men ==
=== Teams ===
The teams are listed as follows:

Team	Skip	Third	Second	Lead	Alternate	University
Alberta Golden Bears	Johnson Tao	Desmond Young	Jaedon Neuert	Gabriel Dyck	Benjamin Morin	University of Alberta
Calgary Dinos	Kenan Wipf	Derek Bowyer	Michael Keenan	Tyson Toews	Ethan Drysdale	(Alberta) University of Calgary
Dalhousie Tigers	Adam McEachren	Ethan Young	David McCurdy	Caelan McPherson		(Nova Scotia) Dalhousie University
Laurentian Voyageurs	Jake Horgan	Olivier Bonin-Ducharme	Derek Leung	Samuel Branconnier	Owen Allard	(Ontario) Laurentian University
Queen's Golden Gaels	Owen Purdy	Colin Schnurr	Grant Schnurr	Connor Massey	Kaamraan Islam	(Ontario) Queen's University at Kingston
Saint Mary's Huskies	Aden Kavanaugh	Benjamin Currie	Chris Churchill	Scott Weagle	Craig Weagle	(Nova Scotia) Saint Mary's University
UNB Reds	Jamie Stewart	Dylan MacDonald	Sean Beland	James Larlee	Loris Elliot	University of New Brunswick
Wilfrid Laurier Golden Hawks	Sam Mooibroek	Kibo Mulima	Wyatt Small	Ben Pearce	Codie Harris	(Ontario) Wilfrid Laurier University

=== Round robin standings ===
Final Round Robin Standings

Key
Teams to Playoffs

Team	Skip	W	L	PF	PA	EW	EL	BE	SE
(Ontario) Wilfrid Laurier Golden Hawks	Sam Mooibroek	6	1	61	43	31	32	0	6
(Nova Scotia) Dalhousie Tigers	Adam McEachren	5	2	50	44	31	24	6	13
(Ontario) Laurentian Voyageurs	Jake Horgan	4	3	43	37	27	25	5	9
(Ontario) Queen's Golden Gaels	Owen Purdy	4	3	59	50	37	27	0	13
Alberta Golden Bears	Johnson Tao	3	4	40	44	26	30	1	7
(New Brunswick) UNB Reds	Jamie Stewart	3	4	42	51	28	30	4	4
(Alberta) Calgary Dinos	Kenan Wipf	2	5	43	48	26	27	7	8
(Nova Scotia) Saint Mary's Huskies	Aden Kavanaugh	1	6	39	60	24	35	3	5

=== Round robin results ===
All draws are listed in Eastern Time (UTC−04:00).

==== Draw 2 ====
Wednesday, March 15, 9:30 pm

Sheet B	1	2	3	4	5	6	7	8	9	10	Final
(New Brunswick) UNB Reds (Stewart) 🔨	0	1	0	0	2	0	0	0	X	X	3
(Nova Scotia) Dalhousie Tigers (McEachren)	0	0	2	1	0	2	3	1	X	X	9

Sheet D	1	2	3	4	5	6	7	8	9	10	Final
(Ontario) Wilfrid Laurier Golden Hawks (Mooibroek)	0	2	0	0	1	0	2	2	X	X	7
(Nova Scotia) Saint Mary's Huskies (Kavanaugh) 🔨	1	0	1	1	0	0	0	0	X	X	3

Sheet G	1	2	3	4	5	6	7	8	9	10	Final
(Ontario) Queen's Golden Gaels (Purdy)	0	4	0	0	1	0	1	1	0	1	8
(Alberta) Calgary Dinos (Wipf) 🔨	1	0	3	1	0	0	0	0	1	0	6

Sheet H	1	2	3	4	5	6	7	8	9	10	Final
(Ontario) Laurentian Voyageurs (Horgan)	0	0	0	0	1	0	1	0	3	X	5
Alberta Golden Bears (Tao) 🔨	2	0	0	1	0	2	0	2	0	X	7

==== Draw 4 ====
Thursday, March 16, 12:30 pm

Sheet B	1	2	3	4	5	6	7	8	9	10	Final
(Nova Scotia) Saint Mary's Huskies (Kavanaugh) 🔨	0	0	0	1	1	0	0	2	X	X	4
(Ontario) Laurentian Voyageurs (Horgan)	1	2	1	0	0	2	3	0	X	X	9

Sheet C	1	2	3	4	5	6	7	8	9	10	Final
(Alberta) Calgary Dinos (Wipf)	0	0	0	1	0	2	0	1	0	X	4
(New Brunswick) UNB Reds (Stewart) 🔨	1	0	2	0	1	0	1	0	2	X	7

Sheet E	1	2	3	4	5	6	7	8	9	10	11	Final
(Nova Scotia) Dalhousie Tigers (McEachren) 🔨	4	0	0	0	2	0	3	0	0	2	1	12
(Ontario) Queen's Golden Gaels (Purdy)	0	1	1	2	0	3	0	3	1	0	0	11

Sheet G	1	2	3	4	5	6	7	8	9	10	Final
Alberta Golden Bears (Tao)	0	1	0	0	0	1	1	0	2	0	5
(Ontario) Wilfrid Laurier Golden Hawks (Mooibroek) 🔨	2	0	1	1	2	0	0	1	0	1	8

==== Draw 6 ====
Thursday, March 16, 8:30 pm

Sheet A	1	2	3	4	5	6	7	8	9	10	Final
Alberta Golden Bears (Tao) 🔨	0	0	3	1	0	1	3	0	X	X	8
(Alberta) Calgary Dinos (Wipf)	1	0	0	0	1	0	0	1	X	X	3

Sheet C	1	2	3	4	5	6	7	8	9	10	Final
(Ontario) Laurentian Voyageurs (Horgan)	0	2	0	4	1	0	1	0	X	X	8
(Ontario) Queen's Golden Gaels (Purdy) 🔨	1	0	1	0	0	1	0	1	X	X	4

Sheet F	1	2	3	4	5	6	7	8	9	10	Final
(Nova Scotia) Saint Mary's Huskies (Kavanaugh)	0	1	1	0	0	3	0	1	0	0	6
(Nova Scotia) Dalhousie Tigers (McEachren) 🔨	2	0	0	1	1	0	0	0	2	1	7

Sheet H	1	2	3	4	5	6	7	8	9	10	Final
(Ontario) Wilfrid Laurier Golden Hawks (Mooibroek) 🔨	2	0	1	0	2	0	0	0	3	0	8
(New Brunswick) UNB Reds (Stewart)	0	2	0	1	0	2	2	1	0	1	9

==== Draw 8 ====
Friday, March 17, 12:30 pm

Sheet A	1	2	3	4	5	6	7	8	9	10	Final
(New Brunswick) UNB Reds (Stewart) 🔨	1	0	1	0	0	1	0	2	0	X	5
(Ontario) Laurentian Voyageurs (Horgan)	0	2	0	1	2	0	1	0	1	X	7

Sheet D	1	2	3	4	5	6	7	8	9	10	Final
(Nova Scotia) Dalhousie Tigers (McEachren) 🔨	0	0	0	2	0	2	2	2	0	X	8
Alberta Golden Bears (Tao)	0	0	0	0	3	0	0	0	1	X	4

Sheet E	1	2	3	4	5	6	7	8	9	10	Final
(Alberta) Calgary Dinos (Wipf)	2	0	1	0	2	0	2	0	0	3	10
(Nova Scotia) Saint Mary's Huskies (Kavanaugh) 🔨	0	0	0	2	0	0	0	3	0	0	5

Sheet F	1	2	3	4	5	6	7	8	9	10	Final
(Ontario) Queen's Golden Gaels (Purdy) 🔨	2	0	1	0	1	0	1	0	2	0	7
(Ontario) Wilfrid Laurier Golden Hawks (Mooibroek)	0	2	0	2	0	2	0	3	0	1	10

==== Draw 10 ====
Friday, March 17, 8:30 pm

Sheet C	1	2	3	4	5	6	7	8	9	10	Final
(Nova Scotia) Saint Mary's Huskies (Kavanaugh) 🔨	1	0	2	0	2	0	0	1	0	1	7
Alberta Golden Bears (Tao)	0	1	0	2	0	1	1	0	1	0	6

Sheet D	1	2	3	4	5	6	7	8	9	10	Final
(Ontario) Queen's Golden Gaels (Purdy) 🔨	2	0	0	2	0	2	1	0	2	X	9
(New Brunswick) UNB Reds (Stewart)	0	0	1	0	1	0	0	2	0	X	4

Sheet E	1	2	3	4	5	6	7	8	9	10	Final
(Ontario) Laurentian Voyageurs (Horgan)	0	2	0	0	1	0	1	0	1	X	5
(Ontario) Wilfrid Laurier Golden Hawks (Mooibroek) 🔨	2	0	2	0	0	2	0	2	0	X	8

Sheet H	1	2	3	4	5	6	7	8	9	10	Final
(Nova Scotia) Dalhousie Tigers (McEachren) 🔨	0	0	0	1	0	1	1	0	X	X	3
(Alberta) Calgary Dinos (Wipf)	1	2	0	0	4	0	0	1	X	X	8

==== Draw 11 ====
Saturday, March 18, 8:30 am

Sheet A	1	2	3	4	5	6	7	8	9	10	Final
(Nova Scotia) Saint Mary's Huskies (Kavanaugh) 🔨	2	0	2	2	0	1	0	0	0	0	7
(Ontario) Queen's Golden Gaels (Purdy)	0	2	0	0	1	0	2	3	1	1	10

Sheet B	1	2	3	4	5	6	7	8	9	10	Final
(Ontario) Wilfrid Laurier Golden Hawks (Mooibroek)	0	0	2	0	3	0	2	4	0	X	11
(Alberta) Calgary Dinos (Wipf) 🔨	2	1	0	1	0	2	0	0	2	X	8

Sheet F	1	2	3	4	5	6	7	8	9	10	Final
Alberta Golden Bears (Tao) 🔨	1	0	1	2	0	2	0	1	0	X	7
(New Brunswick) UNB Reds (Stewart)	0	0	0	0	1	0	1	0	1	X	3

Sheet G	1	2	3	4	5	6	7	8	9	10	Final
(Ontario) Laurentian Voyageurs (Horgan)	2	0	0	0	1	0	0	0	0	X	3
(Nova Scotia) Dalhousie Tigers (McEachren) 🔨	0	1	0	1	0	0	2	0	1	X	5

==== Draw 13 ====
Saturday, March 18, 4:30 pm

Sheet A	1	2	3	4	5	6	7	8	9	10	Final
(Ontario) Wilfrid Laurier Golden Hawks (Mooibroek)	0	1	0	0	1	2	0	0	5	X	9
(Nova Scotia) Dalhousie Tigers (McEachren) 🔨	1	0	1	1	0	0	2	1	0	X	6

Sheet B	1	2	3	4	5	6	7	8	9	10	Final
Alberta Golden Bears (Tao)	0	0	0	0	1	0	0	2	X	X	3
(Ontario) Queen's Golden Gaels (Purdy) 🔨	2	2	2	1	0	2	1	0	X	X	10

Sheet F	1	2	3	4	5	6	7	8	9	10	Final
(Alberta) Calgary Dinos (Wipf) 🔨	3	0	0	0	0	0	1	0	0	0	4
(Ontario) Laurentian Voyageurs (Horgan)	0	2	0	1	0	0	0	1	0	2	6

Sheet G	1	2	3	4	5	6	7	8	9	10	Final
(New Brunswick) UNB Reds (Stewart) 🔨	0	4	2	0	2	0	1	0	2	X	11
(Nova Scotia) Saint Mary's Huskies (Kavanaugh)	0	0	0	3	0	2	0	2	0	X	7

=== Playoffs ===
Semifinal
1	(Ontario) Wilfrid Laurier Golden Hawks	12
4	(Ontario) Queen's Golden Gaels	10
2	(Nova Scotia) Dalhousie Tigers	5
3	(Ontario) Laurentian Voyageurs	4

Final
1	(Ontario) Wilfrid Laurier Golden Hawks	9
2	(Nova Scotia) Dalhousie Tigers	7
Bronze medal game
4	(Ontario) Queen's Golden Gaels	6
3	(Ontario) Laurentian Voyageurs	5

==== Semifinals ====
Sunday, March 19, 9:30 am

Sheet C	1	2	3	4	5	6	7	8	9	10	11	Final
(Nova Scotia) Dalhousie Tigers (McEachren) 🔨	2	0	0	1	0	0	0	0	0	1	1	5
(Ontario) Laurentian Voyageurs (Horgan)	0	0	1	0	0	1	2	0	0	0	0	4

Player percentages
(Nova Scotia) Dalhousie Tigers		(Ontario) Laurentian Voyageurs	
Caelan McPherson	85%	Samuel Branconnier	88%
David McCurdy	67%	Derek Leung	69%
Ethan Young	73%	Olivier Bonin-Ducharme	81%
Adam McEachren	76%	Jake Horgan	83%
Total	75%	Total	80%

Sheet F	1	2	3	4	5	6	7	8	9	10	Final
(Ontario) Wilfrid Laurier Golden Hawks (Mooibroek) 🔨	3	0	1	0	2	1	1	0	0	4	12
(Ontario) Queen's Golden Gaels (Purdy)	0	1	0	2	0	0	0	6	1	0	10

Player percentages
(Ontario) Wilfrid Laurier Golden Hawks		(Ontario) Queen's Golden Gaels	
Ben Pearce	91%	Connor Massey	90%
Wyatt Small	51%	Grant Schnurr	68%
Kibo Mulima	66%	Colin Schnurr	78%
Sam Mooibroek	76%	Owen Purdy	73%
Total	71%	Total	77%

==== Bronze medal game ====
Sunday, March 19, 2:30 pm

Sheet E	1	2	3	4	5	6	7	8	9	10	Final
(Ontario) Queen's Golden Gaels (Purdy) 🔨	0	1	0	0	0	2	0	2	0	1	6
(Ontario) Laurentian Voyageurs (Horgan)	0	0	0	1	1	0	2	0	1	0	5

Player percentages
(Ontario) Queen's Golden Gaels		(Ontario) Laurentian Voyageurs	
Connor Massey	90%	Samuel Branconnier	83%
Grant Schnurr	86%	Derek Leung	85%
Colin Schnurr	88%	Olivier Bonin-Ducharme	95%
Owen Purdy	87%	Jake Horgan	95%
Total	88%	Total	89%

==== Final ====
Sunday, March 19, 2:30 pm

Sheet A	1	2	3	4	5	6	7	8	9	10	Final
(Ontario) Wilfrid Laurier Golden Hawks (Mooibroek) 🔨	2	0	3	1	0	1	0	1	0	1	9
(Nova Scotia) Dalhousie Tigers (McEachren)	0	1	0	0	1	0	2	0	3	0	7

Player percentages
(Ontario) Wilfrid Laurier Golden Hawks		(Nova Scotia) Dalhousie Tigers	
Ben Pearce	75%	Caelan McPherson	89%
Wyatt Small	81%	David McCurdy	73%
Kibo Mulima	80%	Ethan Young	80%
Sam Mooibroek	76%	Adam McEachren	64%
Total	78%	Total	76%

=== Final standings ===
Place	Team
1st place, gold medalist(s)	(Ontario) Wilfrid Laurier Golden Hawks
2nd place, silver medalist(s)	(Nova Scotia) Dalhousie Tigers
3rd place, bronze medalist(s)	(Ontario) Queen's Golden Gaels
4	(Ontario) Laurentian Voyageurs
5	Alberta Golden Bears
6	(New Brunswick) UNB Reds
7	(Alberta) Calgary Dinos
8	(Nova Scotia) Saint Mary's Huskies

== Women ==
=== Teams ===
The teams are listed as follows:

Team	Skip	Third	Second	Lead	Alternate	University
Alberta Pandas	Serena Gray-Withers	Catherine Clifford	Brianna Cullen	Zoe Cinnamon	Gracelyn Richards	University of Alberta
Dalhousie Tigers	Marin Callaghan	Allyson MacNutt	Lindsey Burgess	Grace McCusker	Natasha Fortin	(Nova Scotia) Dalhousie University
Laurentian Voyageurs	Bella Croisier	Piper Croisier	Abby Deschene	Julia Deklein	Katie Vanderloo	(Ontario) Laurentian University
McMaster Marauders	Maddy Warriner	Grace Lloyd	Evelyn Robert	Clara Dissanayake	Anastasia Cornea	(Ontario) McMaster University
Memorial Sea-Hawks	Mackenzie Mitchell	Sarah McNeil Lamswood	Kate Paterson	Emily Neary		(Newfoundland and Labrador) Memorial University of Newfoundland
TMU Bold	Courtney Auld	Cayla Auld	Émilie Lovitt Sansoucy	Jessica Filipcic	Alexandra Scully	(Ontario) Toronto Metropolitan University
UPEI Panthers	Rachel MacLean	Sydney Howatt	Lexie Murray	Beth Stokes		University of Prince Edward Island
Victoria Vikes	Kayla Wilson	Meredith Cole	Gabby Brissette	Elizabeth Bowles	Mahra Harris	(British Columbia) University of Victoria

=== Round robin standings ===
Final Round Robin Standings

Key
Teams to Playoffs

Team	Skip	W	L	PF	PA	EW	EL	BE	SE
(Ontario) Laurentian Voyageurs	Bella Croisier	6	1	46	29	32	22	13	12
(Newfoundland and Labrador) Memorial Sea-Hawks	Mackenzie Mitchell	4	3	45	46	27	31	3	9
Alberta Pandas	Serena Gray-Withers	4	3	56	50	34	28	1	14
(Nova Scotia) Dalhousie Tigers	Marin Callaghan	4	3	46	36	28	28	1	12
(Ontario) McMaster Marauders	Maddy Warriner	3	4	45	38	32	27	3	13
(Ontario) TMU Bold	Courtney Auld	3	4	46	46	25	35	3	6
(Prince Edward Island) UPEI Panthers	Rachel MacLean	2	5	30	52	22	29	4	8
(British Columbia) Victoria Vikes	Kayla Wilson	2	5	32	49	27	27	8	8

=== Round robin results ===
All draws are listed in Eastern Time (UTC−04:00).

==== Draw 1 ====
Wednesday, March 15, 5:30 pm

Sheet B	1	2	3	4	5	6	7	8	9	10	Final
(Prince Edward Island) UPEI Panthers (MacLean)	0	0	1	0	4	1	0	0	1	1	8
(Ontario) TMU Bold (Auld) 🔨	0	1	0	0	0	0	1	3	0	0	5

Sheet D	1	2	3	4	5	6	7	8	9	10	Final
(Ontario) McMaster Marauders (Warriner)	2	1	0	1	0	0	0	1	0	0	5
(Nova Scotia) Dalhousie Tigers (Callaghan) 🔨	0	0	2	0	3	1	0	0	1	2	9

Sheet G	1	2	3	4	5	6	7	8	9	10	Final
(Newfoundland and Labrador) Memorial Sea-Hawks (Mitchell)	0	3	0	1	0	0	0	0	0	X	4
(Ontario) Laurentian Voyageurs (Croisier) 🔨	2	0	1	0	3	0	1	1	1	X	9

Sheet H	1	2	3	4	5	6	7	8	9	10	Final
(British Columbia) Victoria Vikes (Wilson) 🔨	1	0	1	0	0	0	3	0	1	0	6
Alberta Pandas (Gray-Withers)	0	3	0	1	0	0	0	2	0	2	8

==== Draw 3 ====
Thursday, March 16, 8:30 am

Sheet B	1	2	3	4	5	6	7	8	9	10	Final
(Nova Scotia) Dalhousie Tigers (Callaghan)	1	0	0	0	0	1	0	2	0	0	4
(British Columbia) Victoria Vikes (Wilson) 🔨	0	0	0	2	1	0	1	0	1	1	6

Sheet C	1	2	3	4	5	6	7	8	9	10	11	Final
(Ontario) Laurentian Voyageurs (Croisier) 🔨	0	0	1	1	1	0	0	0	0	1	1	5
(Prince Edward Island) UPEI Panthers (MacLean)	0	2	0	0	0	1	0	0	1	0	0	4

Sheet E	1	2	3	4	5	6	7	8	9	10	Final
(Ontario) TMU Bold (Auld) 🔨	1	2	0	2	3	2	0	2	X	X	12
(Newfoundland and Labrador) Memorial Sea-Hawks (Mitchell)	0	0	1	0	0	0	1	0	X	X	2

Sheet G	1	2	3	4	5	6	7	8	9	10	Final
Alberta Pandas (Gray-Withers)	0	0	0	1	0	2	0	2	1	2	8
(Ontario) McMaster Marauders (Warriner) 🔨	2	1	1	0	1	0	2	0	0	0	7

==== Draw 5 ====
Thursday, March 16, 4:30 pm

Sheet A	1	2	3	4	5	6	7	8	9	10	Final
Alberta Pandas (Gray-Withers)	0	2	0	2	0	0	1	0	1	0	6
(Ontario) Laurentian Voyageurs (Croisier) 🔨	0	0	1	0	2	1	0	3	0	4	11

Sheet C	1	2	3	4	5	6	7	8	9	10	Final
(British Columbia) Victoria Vikes (Wilson)	0	0	0	1	0	2	0	1	1	0	5
(Newfoundland and Labrador) Memorial Sea-Hawks (Mitchell) 🔨	0	1	1	0	3	0	2	0	0	2	9

Sheet F	1	2	3	4	5	6	7	8	9	10	Final
(Nova Scotia) Dalhousie Tigers (Callaghan)	0	2	2	0	1	1	1	0	X	X	7
(Ontario) TMU Bold (Auld) 🔨	1	0	0	0	0	0	0	1	X	X	2

Sheet H	1	2	3	4	5	6	7	8	9	10	Final
(Ontario) McMaster Marauders (Warriner) 🔨	1	0	0	1	2	0	0	3	X	X	7
(Prince Edward Island) UPEI Panthers (MacLean)	0	0	0	0	0	2	0	0	X	X	2

==== Draw 7 ====
Friday, March 17, 8:30 am

Sheet A	1	2	3	4	5	6	7	8	9	10	Final
(Prince Edward Island) UPEI Panthers (MacLean)	1	0	0	0	1	0	0	2	2	X	6
(British Columbia) Victoria Vikes (Wilson) 🔨	0	0	1	1	0	1	0	0	0	X	3

Sheet D	1	2	3	4	5	6	7	8	9	10	Final
(Ontario) TMU Bold (Auld)	1	3	0	0	0	4	0	2	0	0	10
Alberta Pandas (Gray-Withers) 🔨	0	0	1	2	1	0	1	0	3	1	9

Sheet E	1	2	3	4	5	6	7	8	9	10	Final
(Ontario) Laurentian Voyageurs (Croisier) 🔨	0	0	1	0	1	0	0	1	0	2	5
(Nova Scotia) Dalhousie Tigers (Callaghan)	0	0	0	1	0	1	1	0	1	0	4

Sheet F	1	2	3	4	5	6	7	8	9	10	11	Final
(Newfoundland and Labrador) Memorial Sea-Hawks (Mitchell) 🔨	1	0	2	0	0	0	1	0	1	1	1	7
(Ontario) McMaster Marauders (Warriner)	0	1	0	1	1	1	0	2	0	0	0	6

==== Draw 9 ====
Friday, March 17, 4:30 pm

Sheet C	1	2	3	4	5	6	7	8	9	10	Final
(Nova Scotia) Dalhousie Tigers (Callaghan)	0	0	0	1	1	1	0	2	1	3	9
Alberta Pandas (Gray-Withers) 🔨	0	1	2	0	0	0	2	0	0	0	5

Sheet D	1	2	3	4	5	6	7	8	9	10	Final
(Newfoundland and Labrador) Memorial Sea-Hawks (Mitchell) 🔨	2	1	1	0	0	1	0	6	X	X	11
(Prince Edward Island) UPEI Panthers (MacLean)	0	0	0	0	1	0	1	0	X	X	2

Sheet E	1	2	3	4	5	6	7	8	9	10	Final
(British Columbia) Victoria Vikes (Wilson)	0	0	0	0	1	0	1	1	0	X	3
(Ontario) McMaster Marauders (Warriner) 🔨	1	0	1	3	0	3	0	0	1	X	9

Sheet H	1	2	3	4	5	6	7	8	9	10	11	Final
(Ontario) TMU Bold (Auld) 🔨	0	1	0	0	2	0	0	2	0	0	1	6
(Ontario) Laurentian Voyageurs (Croisier)	1	0	0	1	0	1	1	0	0	1	0	5

==== Draw 12 ====
Saturday, March 18, 12:30 pm

Sheet A	1	2	3	4	5	6	7	8	9	10	Final
(Nova Scotia) Dalhousie Tigers (Callaghan)	0	0	0	0	2	0	0	0	0	X	2
(Newfoundland and Labrador) Memorial Sea-Hawks (Mitchell) 🔨	1	0	1	1	0	0	1	2	3	X	9

Sheet B	1	2	3	4	5	6	7	8	9	10	Final
(Ontario) McMaster Marauders (Warriner)	0	0	0	1	0	0	0	0	1	1	3
(Ontario) Laurentian Voyageurs (Croisier) 🔨	0	1	0	0	0	1	1	1	0	0	4

Sheet F	1	2	3	4	5	6	7	8	9	10	Final
Alberta Pandas (Gray-Withers) 🔨	0	2	0	1	3	3	0	1	X	X	10
(Prince Edward Island) UPEI Panthers (MacLean)	1	0	1	0	0	0	2	0	X	X	4

Sheet G	1	2	3	4	5	6	7	8	9	10	11	Final
(British Columbia) Victoria Vikes (Wilson) 🔨	0	2	0	1	0	0	1	1	0	1	1	7
(Ontario) TMU Bold (Auld)	0	0	1	0	2	0	0	0	3	0	0	6

==== Draw 14 ====
Saturday, March 18, 8:30 pm

Sheet A	1	2	3	4	5	6	7	8	9	10	Final
(Ontario) McMaster Marauders (Warriner) 🔨	2	0	1	0	2	1	0	1	1	X	8
(Ontario) TMU Bold (Auld)	0	2	0	1	0	0	2	0	0	X	5

Sheet B	1	2	3	4	5	6	7	8	9	10	Final
Alberta Pandas (Gray-Withers) 🔨	1	1	1	0	2	3	1	1	X	X	10
(Newfoundland and Labrador) Memorial Sea-Hawks (Mitchell)	0	0	0	3	0	0	0	0	X	X	3

Sheet F	1	2	3	4	5	6	7	8	9	10	Final
(Ontario) Laurentian Voyageurs (Croisier) 🔨	0	0	0	2	4	0	0	1	X	X	7
(British Columbia) Victoria Vikes (Wilson)	0	0	0	0	0	1	1	0	X	X	2

Sheet G	1	2	3	4	5	6	7	8	9	10	Final
(Prince Edward Island) UPEI Panthers (MacLean)	0	1	0	1	0	1	0	1	X	X	4
(Nova Scotia) Dalhousie Tigers (Callaghan) 🔨	2	0	3	0	3	0	3	0	X	X	11

=== Playoffs ===
Semifinal
1	(Ontario) Laurentian Voyageurs	6
4	(Nova Scotia) Dalhousie Tigers	10
2	(Newfoundland and Labrador) Memorial Sea-Hawks	6
3	Alberta Pandas	7

Final
4	(Nova Scotia) Dalhousie Tigers	4
3	Alberta Pandas	5
Bronze medal game
1	(Ontario) Laurentian Voyageurs	6
2	(Newfoundland and Labrador) Memorial Sea-Hawks	5

==== Semifinals ====
Sunday, March 19, 9:30 am

Sheet E	1	2	3	4	5	6	7	8	9	10	Final
(Ontario) Laurentian Voyageurs (Croisier) 🔨	2	0	0	1	0	2	0	0	1	X	6
(Nova Scotia) Dalhousie Tigers (Callaghan)	0	3	1	0	2	0	1	3	0	X	10

Player percentages
(Ontario) Laurentian Voyageurs		(Nova Scotia) Dalhousie Tigers	
Julia Deklein	63%	Grace McCusker	64%
Abby Deschene	79%	Lindsey Burgess	79%
Piper Croisier	54%	Allyson MacNutt	85%
Bella Croisier	60%	Marin Callaghan	67%
Total	64%	Total	74%

Sheet H	1	2	3	4	5	6	7	8	9	10	Final
(Newfoundland and Labrador) Memorial Sea-Hawks (Mitchell)	1	0	1	0	0	1	0	0	2	1	6
Alberta Pandas (Gray-Withers) 🔨	0	1	0	0	1	0	0	5	0	0	7

Player percentages
(Newfoundland and Labrador) Memorial Sea-Hawks		Alberta Pandas	
Emily Neary	89%	Zoe Cinnamon	80%
Kate Paterson	64%	Brianna Cullen	70%
Sarah McNeil Lamswood	79%	Catherine Clifford	79%
Mackenzie Mitchell	66%	Serena Gray-Withers	75%
Total	74%	Total	76%

==== Bronze medal game ====
Sunday, March 19, 2:30 pm

Sheet H	1	2	3	4	5	6	7	8	9	10	Final
(Ontario) Laurentian Voyageurs (Croisier) 🔨	2	0	0	0	2	0	0	1	0	1	6
(Newfoundland and Labrador) Memorial Sea-Hawks (Mitchell)	0	0	1	1	0	2	0	0	1	0	5

Player percentages
(Ontario) Laurentian Voyageurs		(Newfoundland and Labrador) Memorial Sea-Hawks	
Julia Deklein	88%	Emily Neary	80%
Abby Deschene	79%	Kate Paterson	69%
Piper Croisier	74%	Sarah McNeil Lamswood	70%
Bella Croisier	80%	Mackenzie Mitchell	90%
Total	80%	Total	77%

==== Final ====
Sunday, March 19, 2:30 pm

Sheet C	1	2	3	4	5	6	7	8	9	10	Final
(Nova Scotia) Dalhousie Tigers (Callaghan)	0	1	1	0	0	1	0	1	0	0	4
Alberta Pandas (Gray-Withers) 🔨	0	0	0	0	1	0	2	0	1	1	5

Player percentages
(Nova Scotia) Dalhousie Tigers		Alberta Pandas	
Grace McCusker	74%	Zoe Cinnamon	74%
Lindsey Burgess	69%	Brianna Cullen	73%
Allyson MacNutt	73%	Catherine Clifford	69%
Marin Callaghan	66%	Serena Gray-Withers	75%
Total	70%	Total	72%

=== Final standings ===
Place	Team
1st place, gold medalist(s)	Alberta Pandas
2nd place, silver medalist(s)	(Nova Scotia) Dalhousie Tigers
3rd place, bronze medalist(s)	(Ontario) Laurentian Voyageurs
4	(Newfoundland and Labrador) Memorial Sea-Hawks
5	(Ontario) McMaster Marauders
6	(Ontario) TMU Bold
7	(Prince Edward Island) UPEI Panthers
8	(British Columbia) Victoria Vikes
