= Ontario College Advanced Diploma =

Advanced educational diploma

- Awarded for: Three-year program completion
- Location: Ontario
- Country: Canada
- Awarded by: Accredited colleges within Ontario
- Website: www.ontario.ca/page/ontario-colleges

The Ontario College Advanced Diploma (OCAD) is a post-secondary educational undergraduate three-year diploma, granted by colleges of applied arts and technology within Ontario, Canada. The undergraduate advanced diploma is awarded upon the completion of a three-year program of study at the undergraduate level.

According to the Ontario Qualifications Framework, the advanced diploma is listed as a level 8, whereas a basic certificate is a level 1 and a doctoral degree is level 13.

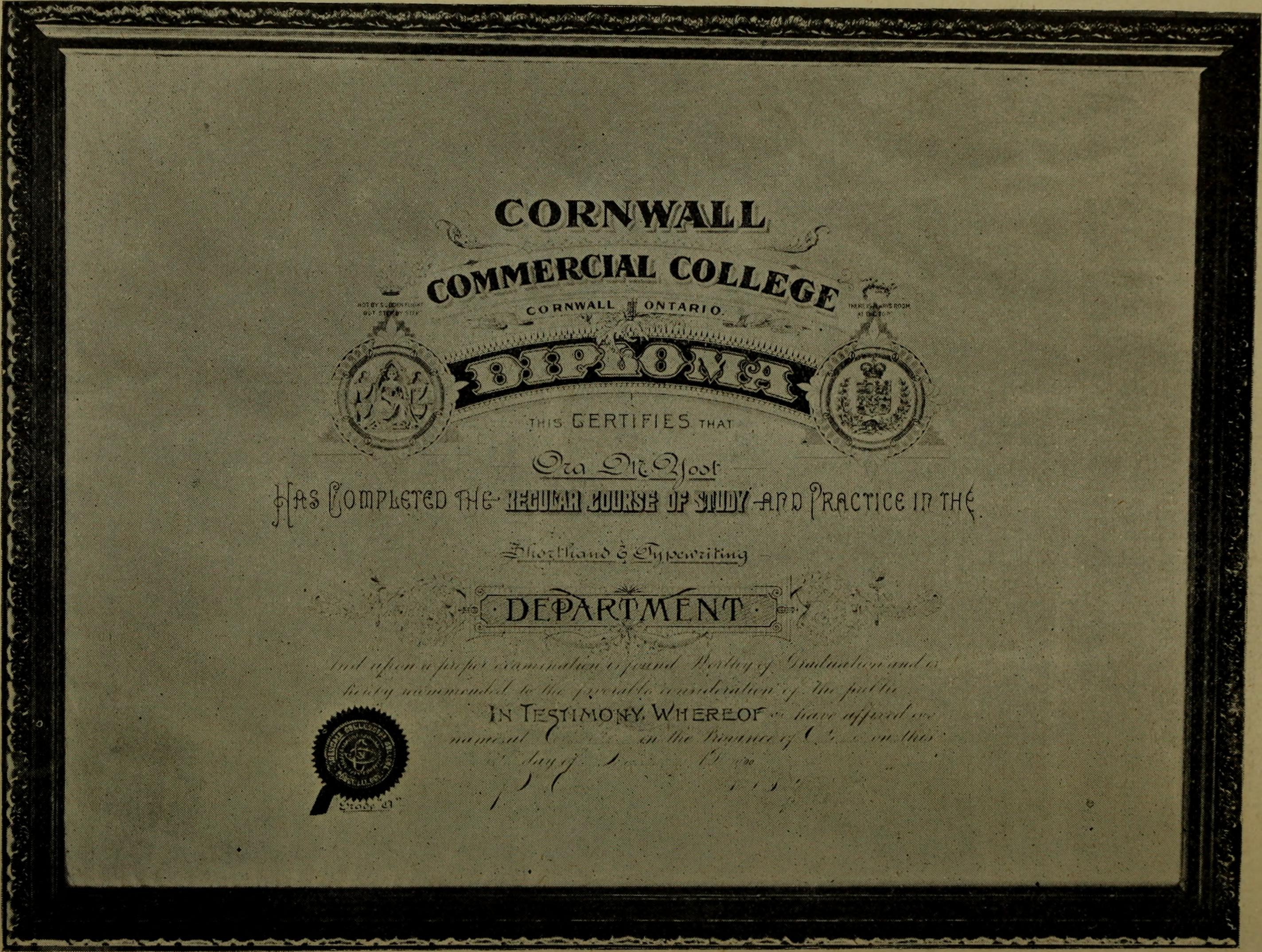
Cornwall commercial college diploma from Ontario (1904)

The diploma succeeds the Ontario College Diploma (OCD) and the Ontario College Certificate (OCC), awarded upon the completion of a two-year and one-year program respectively. It precedes a bachelor's degree.

== See also ==
- List of colleges in Ontario
- Higher education in Ontario
