= Augustana University College =

Lutheran college in Alberta, Canada

- Former names: Camrose Lutheran College, Camrose Lutheran University College
- Type: Private
- Active: 1910–2004
- Affiliations: Evangelical Lutheran Church in Canada
- Location: Camrose, Alberta, Canada; 53.0124°N 112.825°W
- Colours: Red and Black
- Nickname: The Vikings
- Website: http://www.augustana.ualberta.ca/

Augustana University College was a Lutheran college in Camrose, Alberta, Canada, from 1910 until it merged in 2004 with the University of Alberta, becoming its Augustana Faculty.

== History ==
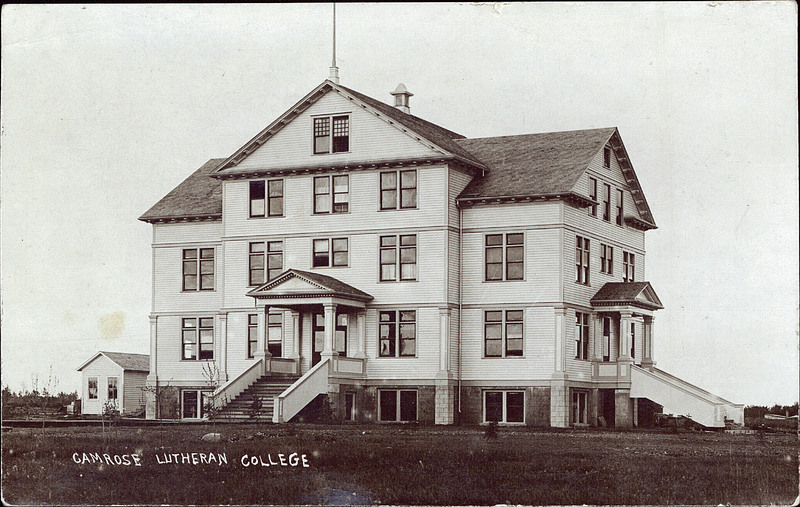
Camrose Lutheran College, ca. 1915. Image courtesy of Peel's Prairie Provinces, University of Alberta Library. https://archive.org/details/PC003149

In 1910 Norwegian settlers in the area around Camrose established a school under the name Camrose Lutheran College. It was initially a secondary school, and was operated by a group of Alberta Lutheran congregations, the Alberta Norwegian Lutheran College Association. Augustana began offering university work in the fall of 1959 as an affiliated college of the University of Alberta and added a second year of the university transfer program in 1969. It became Alberta's first private university in 1985 when the first B.A. degrees were granted.

On July 1, 2004, Augustana University College merged with the University of Alberta to become a separate faculty and satellite campus of the university.
