= Sault College =

Canadian public college in Ontario

Coordinates: 46°31′57.34″N 84°18′40.11″W

Sault College of Applied Arts and Technology
- Motto: The education you want and more...
- Type: Public College of Applied Arts and Technology
- Established: 1965 (originally opened as Ontario Vocational School)
- Affiliations: CCAA, ACCC, AUCC
- President: Sherry Smith
- Students: 4,500 (2025: 1,414 FTEs)
- Location: Sault Ste. Marie & Brampton, Ontario, Canada
- Campus: Suburban
- Sports: Sault Cougars
- Colours: Blue and White
- Mascot: Cougar
- Website: www.saultcollege.ca

Sault College of Applied Arts and Technology is a publicly funded college in Sault Ste. Marie, Ontario, Canada. It began in 1965 as the Ontario Vocational Centre. Today, Sault College is partnered with private Trios College. Sault college offers post-secondary, apprenticeship, adult retraining, continuing education, and contract training programs. Following a focus on foreign enrolment, the percentage of Sault College's budget derived from student fees grew over 6 times larger from 2018 to 2024. In 2024 the college announced it expects a 63% drop in foreign students.

== History ==
In the fall of 1965, the institution opened its doors as the Sault Ste. Marie Ontario Vocational Centre (OVC). Similar vocational schools began in London (now Fanshawe College) and Ottawa (now Algonquin College). In 1967 the Ontario government established a public system of Colleges of Applied Arts & Technology as an evolution of the OVC system. The college was established during the formation of Ontario's college system. Colleges of Applied Arts and Technology were established on May 21, 1965.

Sault Ste. Marie's OVC became the Sault Campus of the newly established Cambrian College, whose main campus was located in Sudbury. A second satellite campus opened in North Bay. Colleges enjoyed immediate public acceptance and support. In fact, Cambrian's enrolment growth was so rapid that within only five years the satellites became independent colleges. The independent Sault College of Applied Arts & Technology emerged in 1973, while Cambrian's campus in North Bay became Canadore College.

Sault College has grown tremendously over the years, adding programs in all disciplines. They now respond to the postsecondary educational needs of more than 4,500 part-time and full-time students each year. Sault College offers education in a number of areas including: Apprenticeship, Aviation, Business, Community Integration through Co-operative Education (CICE), Community Services, Continuing Education, Culinary and Hospitality, Engineering Technology, General Arts and Science, Health Programs, Information Technology Studies, Justice Studies, Language and Communication, Media and Design, Native Education, Natural Environment and Outdoor Studies, Salon and Spa Services, Skilled Trades, Transportation, and Marine Engine Training Programs.

Sault College often shares resources with Lake Superior State University.

== Campus ==
The Sault College campus is currently undergoing upgrades. The Algoma Public Health Building on campus has been built to in cooperation to serve the community of Sault Ste. Marie while being a comfortable location for students in the Nursing program to learn. Essar Hall, which opened in 2011, acts as the main entrance to Sault College. The state of the art facility was built to encompass the elements of the Northern Ontario location. The building was named after Essar Steel Algoma, which donated $1 million towards the ‘Inspiring Growth’ capital campaign for Sault College.

Opening in September 2013, The Sault College Health and Wellness Centre will serve the students’ needs for healthy active life styles, study space, food and drink, as well as the new home of the Sault College Cougars Athletic Department.

Future projects include the construction of a new residence building for the growing student housing needs and ‘The Common Link’. The Common Link, named after a previous president of the college, Dr. Ron Common, acts as a connection between the current campus and the new Health and Wellness Centre.

=== Enji Maawnjiding ===
Enji Maawnjiding ("Where we gather") is an Anishinaabe meeting centre located on the campus, a home away from home for local and out of town students. The centre is the focal point of Sault College's Indigenous student population. Used on a day-to-day basis as a student lounge, Enji Maawnjiding also hosts a number of social and cultural events. Located outside Enji Maawnjiding there is a traditional medicine garden, as well as a sacred arbour and sweat lodge.

=== Student Health & Wellness Centre ===
The new $12.5 million Student Health & Wellness Centre is a 40,000 square foot facility consisting of:

- Academic labs to enhance student learning
- Fitness rooms to promote student & employee health and wellness
- Meeting space to host the sharing of ideas and information
- New gymnasium to better accommodate varsity sports
- New Student Life Centre

Along with offering a greatly improved fitness and recreation area for students and community members, this project is critical to the curriculum of the college in programs of study such as:

- Police Foundations
- Protection Security and Investigation
- Occupational Therapy Assistant/Physiotherapy Assistant
- Fitness & Health Promotion.

== Athletics ==
The Sault Cougars play in the Ontario Colleges Athletic Association West Division, while the Men's and Women's Hockey teams play in the American Collegiate Hockey Association. The football team plays in the Ontario Football Conference of the Canadian Junior Football League.

- Men's Baseball
- Curling
- Golf
- Men's Hockey
- Women's Hockey
- Football
- Women's Volleyball

There is also on campus recreational sports organized by students and staff at Sault College.

- Ball Hockey
- Curling Fun Spiel
- Dodge Ball
- Indoor Soccer
- Beach Volleyball
- 3 on 3 Basketball
- Volleyball
- Golf Tournament
- Road Hockey
- Ultimate Frisbee

== Aircraft fleet ==
Sault College is home of one of the best recognized aviation programs in Canada, the program provides Integrated Commercial Pilot License Aircraft including a multi-engine instrument rating (CPL (A)IR).

- 13xZlin Z-242L
- 3xPiper PA-44 Seminole
- 4xCirrus SR20

== Timmies Cam ==
During the 2012–2013 school year, Sault College introduced the 'Timmies Cam'. This option in the college's online portal allowed for students, faculty, and staff to scan the Tim Horton's area, via web cam, before venturing to the very busy coffee shop. The idea was created through the observation of a tweet that indicated that the line ups were always so long and that they wished they had a way to know when it wasn't busy. Sault College noticed this and introduced the service to help the busy flow of traffic through Tim Horton's.

== See also ==
- Higher education in Ontario
- List of colleges in Ontario
