= Mohawk College =

Public college in Hamilton, Ontario, Canada

Mohawk College of Applied Arts and Technology
- Coat of arms of the college
- Motto: Scientia Opus Omnium (Latin)
- Motto in English: Knowledge, the work of all
- Type: Public college
- Established: 1966; 60 years ago
- Academic affiliations: ACCC; AUCC; CBIE
- Endowment: CA$232 million (2021)
- Chair: Anna Filice
- President: Paul Armstrong
- Vice-president: Cebert Adamson
- Administrative staff: 1,100
- Students: 30,000 (2025: 10,450 FTEs)
- Other students: 4,000 apprenticeships; 2,000 international
- Location: Hamilton, Ontario, Canada; 43°14′17.6″N 79°53′8.48″W
- Campus: Urban
- Other campuses: Burlington; Mississauga
- Colours: Burgundy, crimson, and orange
- Nickname: Mountaineers
- Sporting affiliations: CCAA – OCAA
- Mascot: Mo the Hawk
- Website: www.mohawkcollege.ca

Mohawk College of Applied Arts and Technology (commonly known and branded as Mohawk College) is a public college of applied arts and technology located in Hamilton, Ontario, Canada. Established in 1966, the college currently has five main campuses: the Fennell Campus on the Hamilton Mountain, the Marshall School of Skilled Trades and Apprenticeship Campus in Stoney Creek, the Mohawk-McMaster Institute for Applied Health Sciences at McMaster University, the Centre for Aviation Technology Campus, and a Mississauga campus at Square One in partnership with triOS, a private career college.

As of 2014, more than 1,000 faculty instructors, 12,500 full-time students, 4,000 apprentices, 46,000 continuing education registrants, and 1,800 international students have studied in more than 130 post-secondary and apprenticeship programs. Since its founding, over 115,000 students have graduated from Mohawk College.

In 2024 Mohawk introduced a layoff plan to cut a significant number of staff due to decreased international student enrolment.

== History ==
Mohawk College was established during the formation of Ontario's college system in 1966. The school was founded in 1967 as part of a provincial initiative to create many such institutions to provide career-oriented advanced diploma, diploma, and certificate courses, as well as continuing education programs to Ontario communities.

=== Awards and recognition ===
The college received the Yves Landry Foundation Innovative Manufacturing Technology Program Award in 2006 for its Bachelor of Technology partnership with McMaster University. The foundation also issued awards to the college's Modern Foundry Technologies Institute in 2001 and its Integrated Technician Apprenticeship Program in 2004.

Advertising students at the college have received awards from the Canadian Marketing Association, including gold designations in the student creative category for seven consecutive years.

The college nominates recipients of its Alumni of Distinction award for the provincial Premier's Awards.

In 2007, Mohawk Vice President Academic (retired) Rosemary Knechtel received the Association of Colleges of Applied Arts and Technology of Ontario (now Colleges Ontario) Distinguished Service Award.

In 2008, Mohawk early childhood education graduate Debbie Crickmore and ECE professor Karyn Callaghan received YWCA Hamilton Women of Distinction Awards.

The award was accepted by Owen Thomas, representing the journalism program, and Thomas Raike representing the television program.

== Programs ==
Mohawk offers two-year Ontario college diplomas, three-year Ontario college advanced diplomas, one-year Ontario college graduate certificates and four-year collaborative degree programs, the latter in association with McMaster University.

Mohawk offers more than 130 full-time programs, apprenticeship programs and more than 1,000 continuing education courses.

Mohawk specialise in health science and engineering technology education and is the largest trainer of apprentices in Ontario.

The college provides English language instruction and bridging programs for internationally trained professionals in health sciences and engineering technology.

In 2021, Mohawk opened a centre for aviation technology, consisting of a 75,000 square foot classroom and laboratory space located at the Hamilton International Airport. That same year, Mohawk introduced an accelerated training program for Personal Support Workers, which allows students to become fully credentialed graduates within a six month time period.

== Scholarships ==
In November 2009, the College joined Project Hero, a scholarship program cofounded by General (Ret'd) Rick Hillier for the families of fallen Canadian Forces members.

== Media ==
The college operates a campus radio station, 101.5 The Hawk, and an online student newspaper Ignite News.

== Library ==
Mohawk College has five library locations, one of which is an e-Library. The Fennell Campus library is named the Harold Cummings Library after a $4 million donation by the late Harold Cummings and father of a Mohawk library employee. At the time of the donation in 2009, it was the largest private donation in Mohawk's history.

== Faculties ==
The faculties include the McKeil School of Business, Faculty of Media and Entertainment, Faculty of Engineering Technology, Faculty of Health Sciences, and the Faculty of Community and Urban Studies.

== Campuses ==
=== Fennell Campus ===
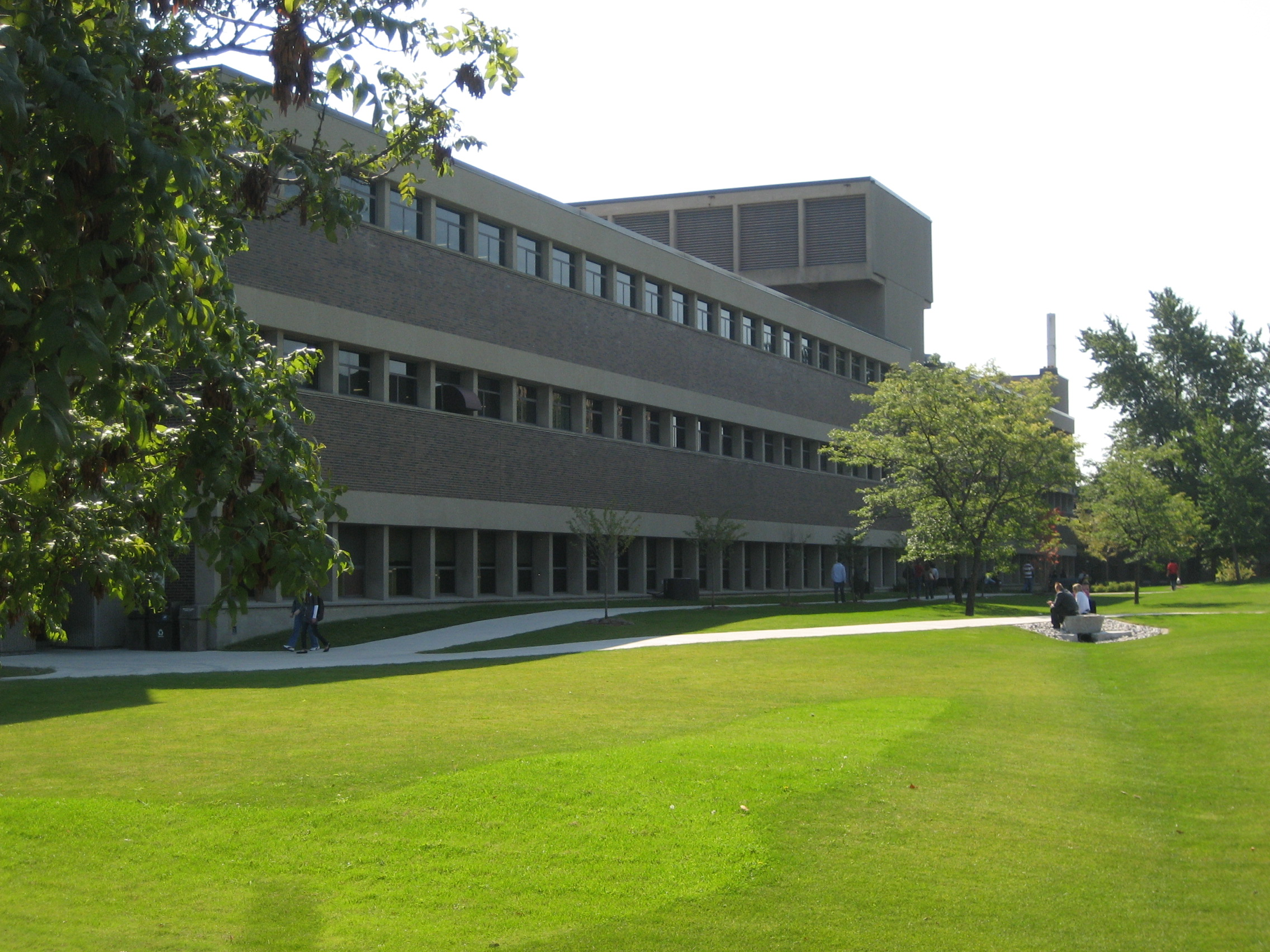
Mohawk College, Fennell Campus, Hamilton, Ontario

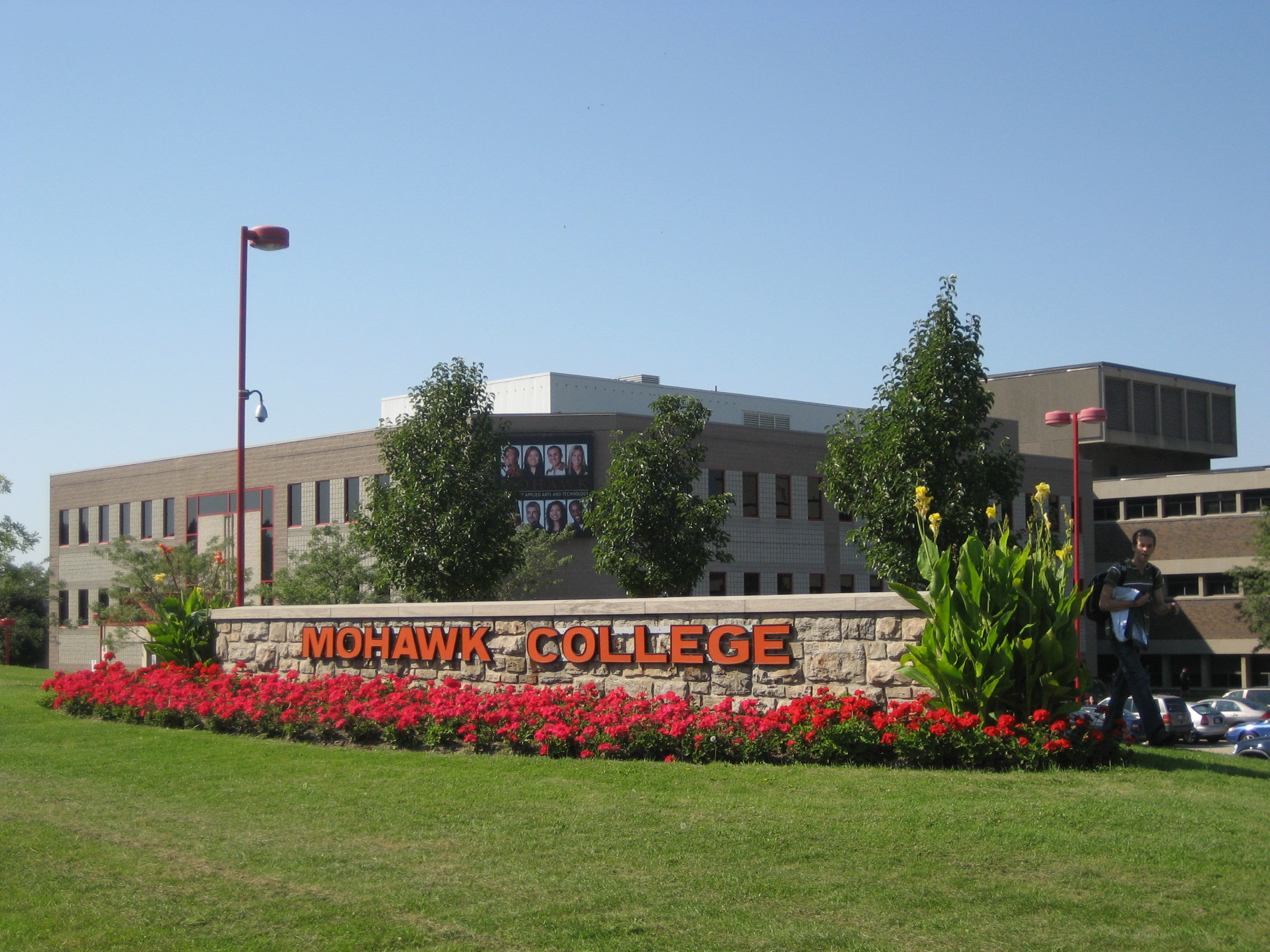
Mohawk College, Fennell Campus, Hamilton, Ontario

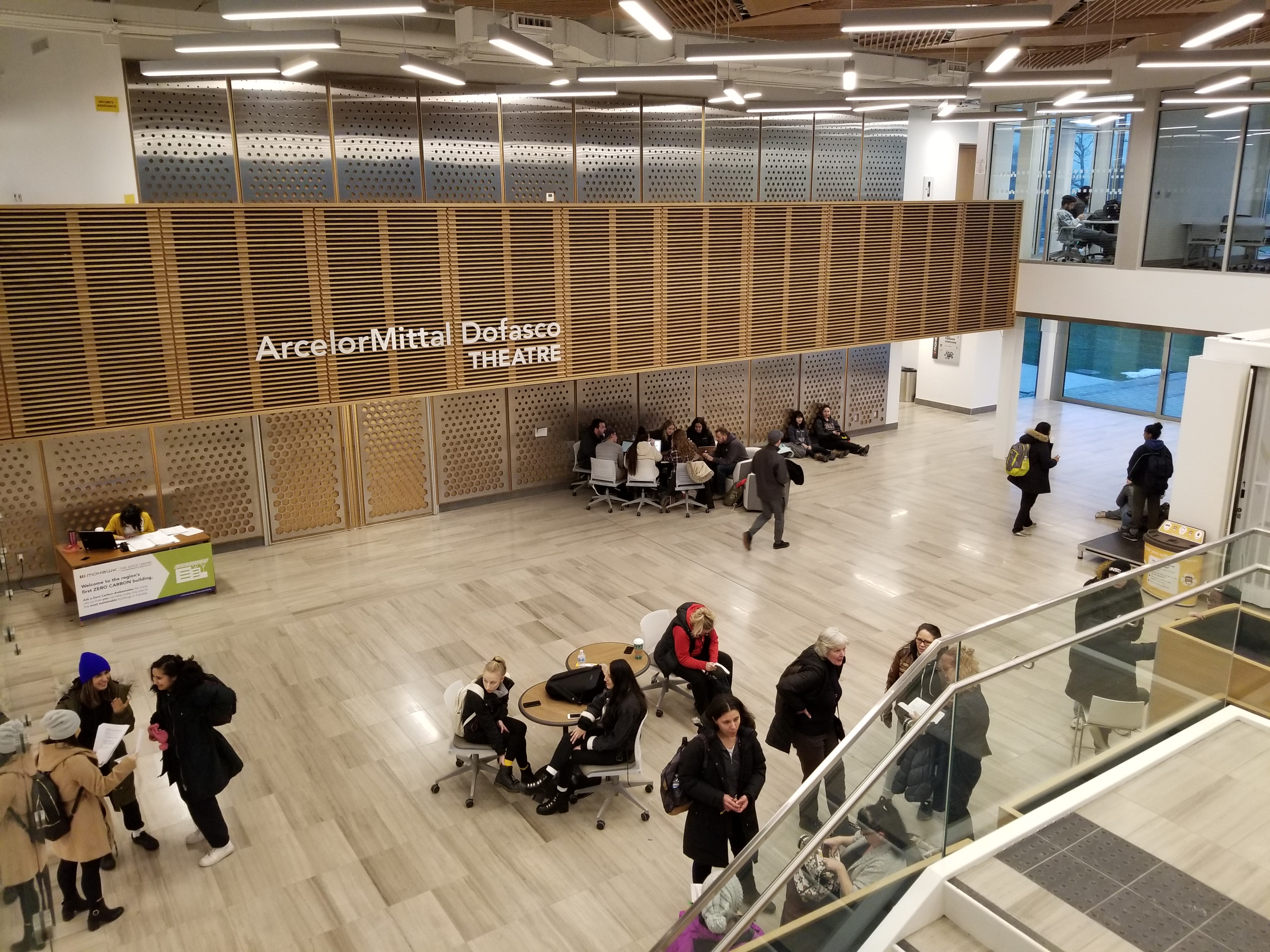
Joyce Centre For Partnership & Innovation (EA Wing) Atrium

The Fennell Campus in Hamilton is Mohawk's main campus and is home to programs from Mohawk's McKeil School of Business, Communication Arts, Technology and Community Services programs.

The Joyce Centre for Partnership & Innovation (Fennell Campus EA Wing) opened in 2018, containing technology laboratories and instructional spaces.

The Fennell Campus includes the McKeil School of Business, named after donors Blair and Kathy McKeil of McKeil Marine. The school hosts programs in advertising, business, marketing, public relations, and office administration.

Mohawk is a member of the Ontario Colleges Athletic Association. In September 2013, Mohawk officially opened the 64,000 square foot David Braley Athletic and Recreation Centre. The $35 million centre is open to all students for varsity and intramural sports and personal fitness.

The McIntyre Performing Arts Centre accommodates up to 1039 people and is only second to Hamilton Place in size in the area.

=== Stoney Creek Campus ===
Mohawk claims to be the largest trainer of apprentices in Ontario, with more than 4,000 apprentices at the Stoney Creek Campus. The newest addition to the campus is a 12,000 square foot building now under construction across from the Gerald Marshall Centre for Transportation. Half of the $3 million building is dedicated to a shop where apprentices from across the campus will work together on large scale community projects. The centre will also include classrooms and programmable control labs.

=== Centre for Aviation Technology at Hamilton International Airport ===
Opened in 2021, the Centre for Aviation Technology, located at the John C. Munro Hamilton International Airport provides specialized facilities and learning spaces designed for students in the 4 aviation technology programs offered by Mohawk College. The campus is equipped with a variety of aircraft located in the hangar and tarmac, practical learning labs, classrooms, common areas, and a cafeteria. The Centre for Aviation Technology is part of a 3 hangar complex owned by aviation maintenance overhaul firm KF Aerospace. The campus takes up the first of the 3 hangars, and provides a strategic partnership between the college and KF Aerospace.

=== IAHS at McMaster University in Hamilton ===
More than 1,700 full-time students attend the Mohawk-McMaster Institute for Applied Health Sciences (IAHS), the first facility in Canada to combine college and university health sciences education and research under one roof. The IAHS is home to collaborative nursing and medical radiation sciences programs that have achieved the highest level of accreditation possible. The IAHS includes a clinical simulation lab modelled after a hospital ward and a fully operational medical radiation lab where students gain hands-on experience prior to clinical placements. Starting in 2016, more than $3 million in renovations will transform the campus into a one-of-a-kind simulated hospital and long-term care centre. Students from Mohawk's Nursing, Practical Nursing, Medical Radiation Sciences, Personal Support Worker and Pharmacy Technician programs will learn together in cross disciplinary teams, mirroring how they'll work during their clinical placements and throughout their careers.

=== City School by Mohawk ===
City School by Mohawk was launched in the fall of 2015 with the opening of the City School location at the Eva Rothwell Centre in North Hamilton.

== Notable alumni ==
- Dominic Agostino, politician
- Jillian Barberie, television personality
- Brad Clark, politician, former PC MPP and Hamilton City Councillor
- Fred Eisenberger, Mayor of Hamilton
- Annette Hamm, journalist, CHCH Morning Live host
- Gary Jones, actor of Stargate SG1 and Stargate Atlantis fame
- Master T (Tony Young), former VJ for MuchMusic in Toronto
- Alex Pierson, formerly SUN News Network morning host
- Spencer Mackenzie, blues artist and awarded musician.
- Joey Muha, drummer and YouTube content creator

== See also ==
- Canadian government scientific research organizations
- Canadian industrial research and development organizations
- Canadian university scientific research organizations
- Higher education in Ontario
- List of colleges in Ontario
- List of universities in Ontario
