= CCAA/Curling Canada College Curling Championships =

Annual curling tournament in Canada

- Established: 1984
- 2026 host city: Regina, Saskatchewan
- 2026 arena: Callie Curling Club

Current champions (2026)
- Men: (Ontario) Humber Hawks
- Women: (Alberta) Red Deer Polytechnic Queens

Current edition
- 2026 CCAA/Curling Canada College Curling Championships

The CCAA/Curling Canada College Curling Championships is an annual bonspiel, or curling tournament, that is scheduled to be held for college teams in the Canadian Collegiate Athletic Association (CCAA). The CCAA held a curling championship annually from 1984 to 1990, then not again until 2012. The championship is a Curling Canada-sanctioned event.

== Past champions ==
Year	Men's champion	Team	Women's champion	Team	Mixed champion	Team	Host
2026	(Ontario) Humber Hawks (4)	Noah Garner, Jacob Horgan, Matthew Abrams, Matthew Moretto, Liam Murphy	(Alberta) Red Deer Polytechnic Queens (3)	Cassidy Blair, Kaily Sparks, Sofia Bascello, Reegan Cox, Danielle Taylor	None		Regina, Saskatchewan (University of Regina)
2025	(Ontario) Mohawk Mountaineers	Jacob Jones, Joel Matthews, Eric Just, Jarrett Matthews, Thomas Del Conte	(British Columbia) PACWEST	Emily Bowles, Erin Fitzgibbon, Alex Ashton, Lauren Cochrane	None		Lethbridge, Alberta (University of Lethbridge)
2024	(Ontario) Humber Hawks (3)	Jacob Dobson, Kevin Genjaga, Noah Garner, Matthew Abrams, Matthew Moretto	(Alberta) Concordia Thunder	Gabrielle Wood, Payton Sonnenberg, Brenna Bilassy, Rachel Jost	None		Fredericton, New Brunswick (University of New Brunswick)
2023	(Ontario) Humber Hawks (2)	Jacob Dobson, Austin Snyder, Noah Garner, Matthew Abrams, Kevin Genjaga	(Alberta) Augustana Vikings	Josie Zimmerman, Bryn Woloshyn, Claire Bevan-Stewart, Darby-Anne Swanson, Hope Zimmerman	None		Sudbury, Ontario (Laurentian University)
2022	Cancelled due to COVID-19 (coronavirus) pandemic						
2021	Cancelled due to COVID-19 (coronavirus) pandemic						
2020	(Alberta) Concordia Thunder (2)	Evan van Amsterdam, Tyler van Amsterdam, Braden Pelech, Cody Holowaychuk, Josh Buchholtz	(British Columbia) Douglas Royals (2)	Kayla MacMillan, Sarah Loken, Patty Wallingham, Kylie Karoway	None		Portage la Prairie, Manitoba
2019	(Alberta) Concordia Thunder	Evan van Amsterdam	(British Columbia) Douglas Royals	Kayla MacMillan, Sarah Loken, Patty Wallingham, Sam Kell	None		Fredericton, New Brunswick (University of New Brunswick)
2018	(British Columbia) Douglas Royals (2)	Daniel Wenzek, Sterling Middleton, Brayden Carpenter, Will Sutton	(Ontario) Fanshawe Falcons (4)	Kaitlyn Poirier	None		Leduc, Alberta (University of Alberta Augustana Campus)
2017	(Ontario) Fanshawe Falcons (3)	Charlie Richard, Tyler Twining, Brady St. Louis, Brandon Twining, Eric Jones	(Alberta) Red Deer Queens (2)		None		Camrose, Alberta (University of Alberta Augustana Campus)
2016	(Ontario) Humber Hawks		(Ontario) Seneca Sting		None		London, Ontario (Fanshawe College)
2015	(Ontario) Fleming Knights	Jason Whitehill, Tyler Warham, Keith Helson, Matt Strathoff, Coach Steve Whitehill	(Ontario) Fanshawe Falcons (3)	Shannon Kee, Rachelle Vink, Christina Borgs, Tess Bobbie, Julie Clinton	None		Olds, Alberta (Olds College)
2014	(Alberta) MacEwan Griffins	Jordan Steinke	(Alberta) Red Deer Queens	Kaitlyn Sherrer	None		Sault Ste. Marie, Ontario (Sault College)
2013	(Alberta) NAIT Ooks	Matt Brown, Kenton Maschmeyer, Kyle Reynolds, Travis Jones, Steven Stewart	(Ontario) Fanshawe Falcons (2)	Jordan Ariss, Cassie Savage, Kaitlyn Knipe, Shannon Kee, Yvonne Lalonde	None		Edmonton, Alberta (NAIT)
2012	(Ontario) Fanshawe Falcons (2)	Chris Jay, D.J. Ronaldson, Luke Grasby, Cody Heyens, Matthew Cottrill	(Ontario) Fanshawe Falcons	Chantal Lalonde, Kaitlyn Knipe, Cassie Savage, Jordan Ariss, Yvonne Lalonde	None		Peterborough, Ontario (Fleming College)
1990	(British Columbia) Douglas Royals		(Ontario) Confederation Thunderhawks (2)		(British Columbia) Selkirk Saints		Kamloops, British Columbia (University College of the Cariboo)
1989	(Manitoba) Assiniboine Cougars (2)		(Ontario) Confederation Thunderhawks		(Alberta) Medicine Hat Rattlers		Olds, Alberta (Olds College)
1988	(Ontario) Fanshawe Falcons		(Alberta) NAIT Ooks		(Ontario) Confederation Thunderhawks		Medicine Hat, Alberta (Medicine Hat College)
1987	(Manitoba) Assiniboine Cougars		Saskatchewan Technical Institute Panthers (2)		(Alberta) GPRC Wolves		Brandon, Manitoba (Assiniboine Community College)
1986	(Alberta) SAIT Trojans		(Ontario) Cambrian Golden Shield		(Alberta) Red Deer Kings		Kamloops, British Columbia (University College of the Cariboo)
1985	(Ontario) Confederation Thunderhawks		(Alberta) SAIT Trojans		(Manitoba) Red River Rebels (2)		Saskatoon, Saskatchewan (Kelsey Institute)
1984	(British Columbia) Selkirk Saints		Saskatchewan Technical Institute Panthers		(Manitoba) Red River Rebels		Kamloops, British Columbia (University College of the Cariboo)
