= 2026 CCAA/Curling Canada College Curling Championships =

2026 CCAA/Curling Canada College Championships
- Host city: Regina, Saskatchewan
- Arena: Callie Curling Club
- Dates: February 17–21
- Men's winner: (Ontario) Humber Hawks
- Skip: Noah Garner
- Fourth: Jacob Horgan
- Second: Matthew Abrams
- Lead: Matthew Moretto
- Alternate: Liam Murphy
- Coach: Sean Turriff
- Finalist: (Alberta) NAIT Ooks (van Amsterdam)
- Women's winner: (Alberta) Red Deer Polytechnic Queens
- Skip: Cassidy Blair
- Third: Kaily Sparks
- Second: Sofia Bascello
- Lead: Reegan Cox
- Alternate: Danielle Taylor
- Coach: Eldon Raab
- Finalist: (Alberta) SAIT Trojans (Scoffin)

The 2026 CCAA/Curling Canada College Championships were held from February 17 to 21 at the Callie Curling Club in Regina, Saskatchewan. The event was hosted by the University of Saskatchewan. The event was held in conjunction with the 2026 U Sports/Curling Canada University Curling Championships, the Canadian university curling championship.

== Men ==
=== Teams ===
The teams are listed as follows:

Team	Skip	Third	Second	Lead	Alternate	College
Assiniboine Cougars	Zach Norris	Blake Rosling	Gavin Chuhai	Peyton Kominko		(Manitoba) Assiniboine Community College
Concordia Thunder	Sean Borkovic	Joel MacDonald	Anthony Ogg	Greyson Clark		(Alberta) Concordia University of Edmonton
Gaillards du Cégep	Adam Bédard	Nathan Beaudoin-Gendron	Gabriel Audette	Marc-Antoine Robert		(Quebec) Cégep de l'Abitibi-Témiscamingue
Humber Hawks	Jacob Horgan (Fourth)	Noah Garner (Skip)	Matthew Abrams	Matthew Moretto	Liam Murphy	(Ontario) Humber College
Mohawk Mountaineers	Thomas Del Conte	Evan Gandin	Ryerson Hargrave	Noah Brennan	Ryan Carnes	(Ontario) Mohawk College
NAIT Ooks	Anders van Amsterdam	Tyler Brodt	Matthew Hannah	Nolan Peters		Northern Alberta Institute of Technology
SAIT Trojans	Nick Mitsopoulos	Chris Sprinkhuysen	Brady Johnson	Lincoln Lazarick		Southern Alberta Institute of Technology
Sault Cougars	Evan Robert	Ben Appleton	Justin MacKay	Jake Clouthier	Evan Bowman	(Ontario) Sault College

=== Round robin standings ===
Final Round Robin Standings

Key
Teams to Playoffs

Team	Skip	W	L	W–L	PF	PA	EW	EL	BE	SE	LSD
(Ontario) Humber Hawks	Noah Garner	7	0	–	49	27	25	21	2	7	46.44
(Alberta) NAIT Ooks	Anders van Amsterdam	5	2	1–0	43	36	27	23	4	12	44.37
(Quebec) Gaillards du Cégep	Adam Bédard	5	2	0–1	57	42	24	24	0	4	24.55
(Ontario) Sault Cougars	Evan Robert	4	3	–	43	35	26	22	2	11	53.47
(Manitoba) Assiniboine Cougars	Zach Norris	3	4	–	41	40	24	24	2	5	99.28
(Ontario) Mohawk Mountaineers	Thomas Del Conte	2	5	–	28	47	17	25	1	5	85.42
(Alberta) SAIT Trojans	Nick Mitsopoulos	1	6	1–0	35	48	25	26	2	9	78.79
(Alberta) Concordia Thunder	Sean Borkovic	1	6	0–1	32	53	24	27	1	6	43.28

Round Robin Summary Table
Pos.	Team	(Manitoba) ACC	(Alberta) CON	(Quebec) RSEQ	(Ontario) HUM	(Ontario) MOH	(Alberta) NAIT	(Alberta) SAIT	(Ontario) SAU	Record
5	(Manitoba) Assiniboine Cougars	—	11–4	4–9	4–7	8–2	5–8	5–4	4–6	3–4
8	(Alberta) Concordia Thunder	4–11	—	5–10	3–9	7–5	5–6	5–6	3–6	1–6
3	(Quebec) Gaillards du Cégep	9–4	10–5	—	6–8	11–3	4–9	8–5	9–8	5–2
1	(Ontario) Humber Hawks	7–4	9–3	8–6	—	6–2	7–4	6–4	6–4	7–0
6	(Ontario) Mohawk Mountaineers	2–8	5–7	3–11	2–6	—	5–2	8–7	3–6	2–5
2	(Alberta) NAIT Ooks	8–5	6–5	9–4	4–7	2–5	—	8–5	6–5	5–2
7	(Alberta) SAIT Trojans	4–5	6–5	5–8	4–6	7–8	5–8	—	4–8	1–6
4	(Ontario) Sault Cougars	6–4	6–3	8–9	4–6	6–3	5–6	8–4	—	4–3

=== Round robin results ===
All draws are listed in Central Time (UTC−06:00).

==== Draw 1 ====
Tuesday, February 17, 3:00 pm

Sheet B	1	2	3	4	5	6	7	8	Final
(Manitoba) Assiniboine Cougars (Norris) 🔨	1	0	2	0	0	1	0	X	4
(Ontario) Humber Hawks (Garner)	0	1	0	4	1	0	1	X	7

Sheet D	1	2	3	4	5	6	7	8	Final
(Ontario) Mohawk Mountaineers (Del Conte)	0	1	0	2	0	X	X	X	3
(Quebec) Gaillards du Cégep (Bédard) 🔨	3	0	2	0	6	X	X	X	11

Sheet G	1	2	3	4	5	6	7	8	Final
(Ontario) Sault Cougars (Robert) 🔨	0	1	0	2	1	0	2	X	6
(Alberta) Concordia Thunder (Borkovic)	0	0	1	0	0	2	0	X	3

Sheet H	1	2	3	4	5	6	7	8	Final
(Alberta) SAIT Trojans (Mitsopoulos) 🔨	2	0	1	0	0	2	0	0	5
(Alberta) NAIT Ooks (van Amsterdam)	0	1	0	3	1	0	2	1	8

==== Draw 3 ====
Wednesday, February 18, 9:00 am

Sheet B	1	2	3	4	5	6	7	8	Final
(Quebec) Gaillards du Cégep (Bédard) 🔨	3	0	0	4	1	0	0	X	8
(Alberta) SAIT Trojans (Mitsopoulos)	0	1	1	0	0	2	1	X	5

Sheet C	1	2	3	4	5	6	7	8	Final
(Alberta) Concordia Thunder (Borkovic)	0	1	0	2	0	1	0	X	4
(Manitoba) Assiniboine Cougars (Norris) 🔨	2	0	5	0	1	0	3	X	11

Wednesday, February 18, 9:30 am

Sheet E	1	2	3	4	5	6	7	8	Final
(Ontario) Humber Hawks (Garner) 🔨	1	0	0	1	3	0	0	1	6
(Ontario) Sault Cougars (Robert)	0	1	0	0	0	2	1	0	4

Sheet G	1	2	3	4	5	6	7	8	Final
(Alberta) NAIT Ooks (van Amsterdam) 🔨	0	0	0	0	0	0	2	X	2
(Ontario) Mohawk Mountaineers (Del Conte)	0	0	1	0	3	1	0	X	5

==== Draw 5 ====
Wednesday, February 18, 4:00 pm

Sheet A	1	2	3	4	5	6	7	8	9	Final
(Alberta) NAIT Ooks (van Amsterdam)	0	0	1	0	0	0	3	1	1	6
(Alberta) Concordia Thunder (Borkovic) 🔨	0	2	0	1	1	1	0	0	0	5

Sheet C	1	2	3	4	5	6	7	8	Final
(Alberta) SAIT Trojans (Mitsopoulos)	1	0	1	0	2	0	0	X	4
(Ontario) Sault Cougars (Robert) 🔨	0	2	0	2	0	3	1	X	8

Wednesday, February 18, 4:30 pm

Sheet F	1	2	3	4	5	6	7	8	Final
(Quebec) Gaillards du Cégep (Bédard) 🔨	1	0	2	0	2	0	1	X	6
(Ontario) Humber Hawks (Garner)	0	3	0	1	0	4	0	X	8

Sheet H	1	2	3	4	5	6	7	8	Final
(Ontario) Mohawk Mountaineers (Del Conte)	0	1	0	0	1	0	X	X	2
(Manitoba) Assiniboine Cougars (Norris) 🔨	2	0	1	4	0	1	X	X	8

==== Draw 7 ====
Thursday, February 19, 9:00 am

Sheet A	1	2	3	4	5	6	7	8	Final
(Manitoba) Assiniboine Cougars (Norris)	0	0	0	1	0	2	1	1	5
(Alberta) SAIT Trojans (Mitsopoulos) 🔨	0	2	1	0	1	0	0	0	4

Sheet D	1	2	3	4	5	6	7	8	Final
(Ontario) Humber Hawks (Garner) 🔨	2	0	1	0	2	0	0	2	7
(Alberta) NAIT Ooks (van Amsterdam)	0	0	0	1	0	2	1	0	4

Thursday, February 19, 9:30 am

Sheet E	1	2	3	4	5	6	7	8	Final
(Alberta) Concordia Thunder (Borkovic)	0	0	1	0	3	1	0	X	5
(Quebec) Gaillards du Cégep (Bédard) 🔨	1	2	0	5	0	0	2	X	10

Sheet F	1	2	3	4	5	6	7	8	Final
(Ontario) Sault Cougars (Robert) 🔨	0	2	1	2	0	0	1	X	6
(Ontario) Mohawk Mountaineers (Del Conte)	0	0	0	0	2	1	0	X	3

==== Draw 9 ====
Thursday, February 19, 4:00 pm

Sheet C	1	2	3	4	5	6	7	8	Final
(Quebec) Gaillards du Cégep (Bédard) 🔨	1	0	0	0	3	0	0	X	4
(Alberta) NAIT Ooks (van Amsterdam)	0	2	1	4	0	1	1	X	9

Sheet D	1	2	3	4	5	6	7	8	Final
(Ontario) Sault Cougars (Robert)	0	1	0	4	0	0	1	0	6
(Manitoba) Assiniboine Cougars (Norris) 🔨	0	0	1	0	0	2	0	1	4

Thursday, February 19, 4:30 pm

Sheet E	1	2	3	4	5	6	7	8	Final
(Alberta) SAIT Trojans (Mitsopoulos)	2	3	0	0	1	0	1	0	7
(Ontario) Mohawk Mountaineers (Del Conte) 🔨	0	0	5	1	0	0	0	2	8

Sheet H	1	2	3	4	5	6	7	8	Final
(Ontario) Humber Hawks (Garner)	0	2	4	0	3	0	X	X	9
(Alberta) Concordia Thunder (Borkovic) 🔨	1	0	0	1	0	1	X	X	3

==== Draw 12 ====
Friday, February 20, 12:30 pm

Sheet A	1	2	3	4	5	6	7	8	Final
(Quebec) Gaillards du Cégep (Bédard) 🔨	1	0	0	0	3	3	0	2	9
(Ontario) Sault Cougars (Robert)	0	2	3	2	0	0	1	0	8

Sheet B	1	2	3	4	5	6	7	8	Final
(Ontario) Mohawk Mountaineers (Del Conte)	0	1	0	0	0	3	0	1	5
(Alberta) Concordia Thunder (Borkovic) 🔨	2	0	1	1	1	0	2	0	7

Friday, February 20, 1:00 pm

Sheet F	1	2	3	4	5	6	7	8	Final
(Alberta) NAIT Ooks (van Amsterdam) 🔨	0	2	0	2	0	2	1	1	8
(Manitoba) Assiniboine Cougars (Norris)	1	0	2	0	2	0	0	0	5

Sheet G	1	2	3	4	5	6	7	8	Final
(Alberta) SAIT Trojans (Mitsopoulos) 🔨	2	0	1	0	0	1	0	X	4
(Ontario) Humber Hawks (Garner)	0	3	0	2	0	0	1	X	6

==== Draw 14 ====
Friday, February 20, 7:30 pm

Sheet A	1	2	3	4	5	6	7	8	Final
(Ontario) Mohawk Mountaineers (Del Conte) 🔨	1	0	0	0	0	0	1	X	2
(Ontario) Humber Hawks (Garner)	0	0	2	2	1	1	0	X	6

Sheet B	1	2	3	4	5	6	7	8	Final
(Alberta) NAIT Ooks (van Amsterdam) 🔨	0	3	1	1	0	0	0	1	6
(Ontario) Sault Cougars (Robert)	1	0	0	0	2	1	1	0	5

Friday, February 20, 8:00 pm

Sheet F	1	2	3	4	5	6	7	8	9	Final
(Alberta) Concordia Thunder (Borkovic) 🔨	1	1	0	0	0	1	0	2	0	5
(Alberta) SAIT Trojans (Mitsopoulos)	0	0	1	1	1	0	2	0	1	6

Sheet G	1	2	3	4	5	6	7	8	Final
(Manitoba) Assiniboine Cougars (Norris)	1	0	2	0	1	0	0	X	4
(Quebec) Gaillards du Cégep (Bédard) 🔨	0	5	0	1	0	1	2	X	9

=== Playoffs ===
Semifinal
1	(Ontario) Humber Hawks	8
4	(Ontario) Sault Cougars	5
2	(Alberta) NAIT Ooks	6
3	(Quebec) Gaillards du Cégep	4

Final
1	(Ontario) Humber Hawks	7
2	(Alberta) NAIT Ooks	2
Bronze medal game
4	(Ontario) Sault Cougars	4
3	(Quebec) Gaillards du Cégep	6

==== Semifinals ====
Saturday, February 21, 9:00 am

Sheet C	1	2	3	4	5	6	7	8	Final
(Ontario) Humber Hawks (Garner) 🔨	2	0	2	0	0	1	0	3	8
(Ontario) Sault Cougars (Robert)	0	1	0	1	1	0	2	0	5

Sheet D	1	2	3	4	5	6	7	8	Final
(Alberta) NAIT Ooks (van Amsterdam)	1	0	0	1	0	3	1	X	6
(Quebec) Gaillards du Cégep (Bédard) 🔨	0	1	2	0	1	0	0	X	4

==== Bronze medal game ====
Saturday, February 21, 1:00 pm

Sheet B	1	2	3	4	5	6	7	8	Final
(Ontario) Sault Cougars (Robert)	0	1	0	1	1	0	1	0	4
(Quebec) Gaillards du Cégep (Bédard) 🔨	1	0	1	0	0	2	0	2	6

==== Final ====
Saturday, February 21, 1:00 pm

Sheet A	1	2	3	4	5	6	7	8	Final
(Ontario) Humber Hawks (Garner) 🔨	1	1	0	2	0	2	1	X	7
(Alberta) NAIT Ooks (van Amsterdam)	0	0	1	0	1	0	0	X	2

=== Final standings ===
Place	Team
1st place, gold medalist(s)	(Ontario) Humber Hawks
2nd place, silver medalist(s)	(Alberta) NAIT Ooks
3rd place, bronze medalist(s)	(Quebec) Gaillards du Cégep
4	(Ontario) Sault Cougars
5	(Manitoba) Assiniboine Cougars
6	(Ontario) Mohawk Mountaineers
7	(Alberta) SAIT Trojans
8	(Alberta) Concordia Thunder

== Women ==
=== Teams ===
The teams are listed as follows:

Team	Skip	Third	Second	Lead	Alternate	College
Assiniboine Cougars	Presley Wells	Sylvie Koroluk	Skylar Winters	Andrea Laura Oleschuk	Serena Lwanga	(Manitoba) Assiniboine Community College
Concordia Thunder	Tori Hartwell	Siobhan McGriskin	Morgan Sweezie	Rachel Jost		(Alberta) Concordia University of Edmonton
Humber Hawks	Hailey Brittain	Claire Hastings	Amy Johnson	Julie Bernatchez	Julia Stradiotto	(Ontario) Humber College
Mohawk Mountaineers	Madison Babcock	Lilyanna Padoin Lee	Natalie Scholtens	Jordyn Quait		(Ontario) Mohawk College
Niagara Knights	Julia Markle	Megan Ford	Cassandra Barnard	Briana Szigeti-Jonasson	Carmen Warboys	(Ontario) Niagara College
PACWEST	Emily Bowles	Erin Fitzgibbon	Ashley Fenton	Lauren Cochrane		(British Columbia) Pacific Western Athletic Association
Red Deer Polytechnic Queens	Cassidy Blair	Kaily Sparks	Sofia Bascello	Reegan Cox	Danielle Taylor	(Alberta) Red Deer Polytechnic
SAIT Trojans	Bayly Scoffin	Raelyn Helston	Kaleigh Shannon	Madison Milot		Southern Alberta Institute of Technology

=== Round robin standings ===
Final Round Robin Standings

Key
Teams to Playoffs

Team	Skip	W	L	W–L	PF	PA	EW	EL	BE	SE	LSD
(Alberta) Red Deer Polytechnic Queens	Cassidy Blair	6	1	1–0	49	26	27	19	1	12	43.08
(Alberta) SAIT Trojans	Bayly Scoffin	6	1	0–1	54	25	31	16	1	16	51.18
(British Columbia) PACWEST	Emily Bowles	5	2	–	50	26	25	17	0	13	81.16
(Alberta) Concordia Thunder	Tori Hartwell	4	3	1–0	52	29	25	22	3	8	70.52
(Ontario) Niagara Knights	Julia Markle	4	3	0–1	49	38	23	23	4	7	50.60
(Ontario) Mohawk Mountaineers	Madison Babcock	2	5	–	40	46	21	29	0	8	52.98
(Ontario) Humber Hawks	Hailey Brittain	1	6	–	31	64	19	23	0	6	68.38
(Manitoba) Assiniboine Cougars	Presley Wells	0	7	–	11	82	10	32	0	3	101.63

Round Robin Summary Table
Pos.	Team	(Manitoba) ACC	(Alberta) CON	(Ontario) HUM	(Ontario) MOH	(Ontario) NIA	(British Columbia) PAC	(Alberta) RDP	(Alberta) SAIT	Record
8	(Manitoba) Assiniboine Cougars	—	2–11	1–13	3–11	1–14	0–9	3–12	1–12	0–7
4	(Alberta) Concordia Thunder	11–2	—	15–2	9–4	5–4	3–4	3–6	6–7	4–3
7	(Ontario) Humber Hawks	13–1	2–15	—	2–8	4–10	3–14	4–6	3–10	1–6
6	(Ontario) Mohawk Mountaineers	11–3	4–9	8–2	—	6–9	6–7	3–7	2–9	2–5
5	(Ontario) Niagara Knights	14–1	4–5	10–4	9–6	—	2–11	7–4	3–7	4–3
3	(British Columbia) PACWEST	9–0	4–3	14–3	7–6	11–2	—	2–7	3–5	5–2
1	(Alberta) Red Deer Polytechnic Queens	12–3	6–3	6–4	7–3	4–7	7–2	—	7–4	6–1
2	(Alberta) SAIT Trojans	12–1	7–6	10–3	9–2	7–3	5–3	4–7	—	6–1

=== Round robin results ===
All draws are listed in Central Time (UTC−06:00).

==== Draw 1 ====
Tuesday, February 17, 3:00 pm

Sheet A	1	2	3	4	5	6	7	8	Final
(Alberta) Red Deer Polytechnic Queens (Blair)	3	4	0	3	0	2	X	X	12
(Manitoba) Assiniboine Cougars (Wells) 🔨	0	0	1	0	2	0	X	X	3

Sheet C	1	2	3	4	5	6	7	8	Final
(British Columbia) PACWEST (Bowles)	0	5	3	0	6	X	X	X	14
(Ontario) Humber Hawks (Brittain) 🔨	2	0	0	1	0	X	X	X	3

Sheet E	1	2	3	4	5	6	7	8	Final
(Ontario) Niagara Knights (Markle) 🔨	0	0	1	0	0	2	0	0	3
(Alberta) SAIT Trojans (Scoffin)	0	2	0	1	1	0	2	1	7

Sheet F	1	2	3	4	5	6	7	8	Final
(Ontario) Mohawk Mountaineers (Babcock) 🔨	0	0	1	0	2	0	1	0	4
(Alberta) Concordia Thunder (Hartwell)	1	1	0	1	0	2	0	4	9

==== Draw 3 ====
Wednesday, February 18, 9:00 am

Sheet A	1	2	3	4	5	6	7	8	Final
(British Columbia) PACWEST (Bowles) 🔨	0	4	3	0	3	1	X	X	11
(Ontario) Niagara Knights (Markle)	2	0	0	0	0	0	X	X	2

Sheet D	1	2	3	4	5	6	7	8	Final
(Alberta) Concordia Thunder (Hartwell) 🔨	0	1	0	3	2	1	4	X	11
(Manitoba) Assiniboine Cougars (Wells)	1	0	1	0	0	0	0	X	2

Wednesday, February 18, 9:30 am

Sheet F	1	2	3	4	5	6	7	8	Final
(Ontario) Humber Hawks (Brittain) 🔨	0	0	1	1	0	1	X	X	3
(Alberta) SAIT Trojans (Scoffin)	5	3	0	0	2	0	X	X	10

Sheet H	1	2	3	4	5	6	7	8	Final
(Ontario) Mohawk Mountaineers (Babcock) 🔨	0	0	0	1	1	1	0	X	3
(Alberta) Red Deer Polytechnic Queens (Blair)	2	3	1	0	0	0	1	X	7

==== Draw 5 ====
Wednesday, February 18, 4:00 pm

Sheet B	1	2	3	4	5	6	7	8	Final
(Manitoba) Assiniboine Cougars (Wells)	0	0	1	0	0	0	X	X	1
(Ontario) Niagara Knights (Markle) 🔨	4	6	0	1	2	1	X	X	14

Sheet D	1	2	3	4	5	6	7	8	Final
(Alberta) SAIT Trojans (Scoffin) 🔨	0	2	1	0	1	0	0	X	4
(Alberta) Red Deer Polytechnic Queens (Blair)	3	0	0	2	0	1	1	X	7

Wednesday, February 18, 4:30 pm

Sheet E	1	2	3	4	5	6	7	8	Final
(Alberta) Concordia Thunder (Hartwell) 🔨	0	0	1	0	0	2	0	0	3
(British Columbia) PACWEST (Bowles)	0	0	0	1	1	0	1	1	4

Sheet G	1	2	3	4	5	6	7	8	Final
(Ontario) Humber Hawks (Brittain)	1	0	0	0	0	0	1	X	2
(Ontario) Mohawk Mountaineers (Babcock) 🔨	0	1	2	2	1	2	0	X	8

==== Draw 7 ====
Thursday, February 19, 9:00 am

Sheet B	1	2	3	4	5	6	7	8	Final
(Alberta) Red Deer Polytechnic Queens (Blair) 🔨	0	1	0	3	0	2	1	X	7
(British Columbia) PACWEST (Bowles)	0	0	1	0	1	0	0	X	2

Sheet C	1	2	3	4	5	6	7	8	Final
(Ontario) Niagara Knights (Markle) 🔨	2	0	1	0	1	2	0	3	9
(Ontario) Mohawk Mountaineers (Babcock)	0	2	0	1	0	0	3	0	6

Thursday, February 19, 9:30 am

Sheet G	1	2	3	4	5	6	7	8	Final
(Alberta) SAIT Trojans (Scoffin) 🔨	1	0	1	0	2	2	1	0	7
(Alberta) Concordia Thunder (Hartwell)	0	1	0	3	0	0	0	2	6

Sheet H	1	2	3	4	5	6	7	8	Final
(Manitoba) Assiniboine Cougars (Wells)	0	0	0	0	1	0	X	X	1
(Ontario) Humber Hawks (Brittain) 🔨	3	1	3	3	0	3	X	X	13

==== Draw 9 ====
Thursday, February 19, 4:00 pm

Sheet A	1	2	3	4	5	6	7	8	Final
(Ontario) Mohawk Mountaineers (Babcock)	0	0	0	0	2	0	X	X	2
(Alberta) SAIT Trojans (Scoffin) 🔨	2	3	1	1	0	2	X	X	9

Sheet B	1	2	3	4	5	6	7	8	Final
(Alberta) Concordia Thunder (Hartwell) 🔨	6	0	3	2	4	X	X	X	15
(Ontario) Humber Hawks (Brittain)	0	2	0	0	0	X	X	X	2

Thursday, February 19, 4:30 pm

Sheet F	1	2	3	4	5	6	7	8	Final
(British Columbia) PACWEST (Bowles)	2	3	1	2	1	X	X	X	9
(Manitoba) Assiniboine Cougars (Wells) 🔨	0	0	0	0	0	X	X	X	0

Sheet G	1	2	3	4	5	6	7	8	Final
(Ontario) Niagara Knights (Markle) 🔨	0	2	0	2	2	0	0	1	7
(Alberta) Red Deer Polytechnic Queens (Blair)	0	0	1	0	0	2	1	0	4

==== Draw 12 ====
Friday, February 20, 12:30 pm

Sheet C	1	2	3	4	5	6	7	8	Final
(Manitoba) Assiniboine Cougars (Wells)	0	0	0	1	0	0	X	X	1
(Alberta) SAIT Trojans (Scoffin) 🔨	2	1	3	0	3	3	X	X	12

Sheet D	1	2	3	4	5	6	7	8	Final
(British Columbia) PACWEST (Bowles)	0	2	0	1	1	0	2	1	7
(Ontario) Mohawk Mountaineers (Babcock) 🔨	1	0	1	0	0	4	0	0	6

Friday, February 20, 1:00 pm

Sheet E	1	2	3	4	5	6	7	8	Final
(Ontario) Humber Hawks (Brittain)	0	1	0	0	1	0	2	X	4
(Alberta) Red Deer Polytechnic Queens (Blair) 🔨	2	0	1	2	0	1	0	X	6

Sheet H	1	2	3	4	5	6	7	8	Final
(Alberta) Concordia Thunder (Hartwell) 🔨	1	0	0	0	2	0	1	1	5
(Ontario) Niagara Knights (Markle)	0	0	1	1	0	2	0	0	4

==== Draw 14 ====
Friday, February 20, 7:30 pm

Sheet C	1	2	3	4	5	6	7	8	Final
(Alberta) Red Deer Polytechnic Queens (Blair)	0	1	1	0	2	0	2	X	6
(Alberta) Concordia Thunder (Hartwell) 🔨	0	0	0	2	0	1	0	X	3

Sheet D	1	2	3	4	5	6	7	8	Final
(Ontario) Humber Hawks (Brittain)	1	0	2	0	1	0	X	X	4
(Ontario) Niagara Knights (Markle) 🔨	0	1	0	2	0	7	X	X	10

Friday, February 20, 8:00 pm

Sheet E	1	2	3	4	5	6	7	8	Final
(Manitoba) Assiniboine Cougars (Wells) 🔨	0	0	1	1	1	0	X	X	3
(Ontario) Mohawk Mountaineers (Babcock)	7	2	0	0	0	2	X	X	11

Sheet H	1	2	3	4	5	6	7	8	Final
(Alberta) SAIT Trojans (Scoffin) 🔨	0	1	0	1	1	1	0	1	5
(British Columbia) PACWEST (Bowles)	0	0	1	0	0	0	2	0	3

=== Playoffs ===
Semifinal
1	(Alberta) Red Deer Polytechnic Queens	6
4	(Alberta) Concordia Thunder	5
2	(Alberta) SAIT Trojans	7
3	(British Columbia) PACWEST	2

Final
1	(Alberta) Red Deer Polytechnic Queens	6
2	(Alberta) SAIT Trojans	5
Bronze medal game
4	(Alberta) Concordia Thunder	4
3	(British Columbia) PACWEST	5

==== Semifinals ====
Saturday, February 21, 9:00 am

Sheet A	1	2	3	4	5	6	7	8	Final
(Alberta) Red Deer Polytechnic Queens (Blair) 🔨	0	3	0	1	0	1	0	1	6
(Alberta) Concordia Thunder (Hartwell)	1	0	1	0	2	0	1	0	5

Sheet B	1	2	3	4	5	6	7	8	Final
(Alberta) SAIT Trojans (Scoffin) 🔨	2	0	1	0	2	1	1	X	7
(British Columbia) PACWEST (Bowles)	0	1	0	1	0	0	0	X	2

==== Bronze medal game ====
Saturday, February 21, 1:00 pm

Sheet D	1	2	3	4	5	6	7	8	Final
(Alberta) Concordia Thunder (Hartwell)	0	1	1	0	1	0	1	0	4
(British Columbia) PACWEST (Bowles) 🔨	1	0	0	2	0	1	0	1	5

==== Final ====
Saturday, February 21, 1:00 pm

Sheet C	1	2	3	4	5	6	7	8	9	Final
(Alberta) Red Deer Polytechnic Queens (Blair) 🔨	1	0	1	1	0	2	0	0	1	6
(Alberta) SAIT Trojans (Scoffin)	0	1	0	0	2	0	1	1	0	5

=== Final standings ===
Place	Team
1st place, gold medalist(s)	(Alberta) Red Deer Polytechnic Queens
2nd place, silver medalist(s)	(Alberta) SAIT Trojans
3rd place, bronze medalist(s)	(British Columbia) PACWEST
4	(Alberta) Concordia Thunder
5	(Ontario) Niagara Knights
6	(Ontario) Mohawk Mountaineers
7	(Ontario) Humber Hawks
8	(Manitoba) Assiniboine Cougars
