= 2012 CCAA Curling Invitational Championship =

- Host city: Peterborough, Ontario
- Arena: Peterborough Curling Club
- Dates: March 21–24
- Men's winner: (Ontario) Fanshawe Falcons
- Skip: Chris Jay
- Third: D.J. Ronaldson
- Second: Luke Grasby
- Lead: Cody Heyens
- Alternate: Matt Cotrill
- Coach: Tom Devaney, Shirley Westman
- Finalist: (Alberta) Red Deer Kings
- Women's winner: (Ontario) Fanshawe Falcons
- Skip: Chantal Lalonde
- Third: Kaitlyn Knipe
- Second: Cassie Savage
- Lead: Jordan Ariss
- Alternate: Yvonne Lalonde
- Coach: Barry Westman, Shirley Westman
- Finalist: (Alberta) Grande Prairie Wolves

The 2012 CCAA Curling Invitational Championship was held from March 21 to 24 at the Peterborough Curling Club in Peterborough, Ontario. The championship was hosted by Fleming College, which is located in Peterborough. It was the first curling tournament held by the Canadian Collegiate Athletic Association since 1990.

The Fanshawe Falcons of Fanshawe College swept the event, winning both the men's and women's championships over Red Deer College and Grande Prairie Regional College, respectively.

== Men ==
=== Teams ===
The teams are listed as follows:

Team	Skip	Third	Second	Lead	Alternate	Coach(es)	University
Augustana Vikings	Kendall Warawa	Donald Meurs	Wyatt Warawa	Ethan Laverty	Dillon Wing	Greg Ryan	University of Alberta – Augustana
Fanshawe Falcons	Chris Jay	D.J. Ronaldson	Luke Grasby	Cody Heyens	Matt Cottrill	Tom Devaney; Barry Westman	(Ontario) Fanshawe College
Fleming Knights	Jason Whitehill	Alex Elliott	Alex Jordan	Richard Hooper	Darin Armstrong	Dave Farnell; Steve Whitehill	(Ontario) Fleming College
Holland Hurricanes	Christian Tolusso	Alex Sutherland	Taylor McInnis	Patrick Moore		Angela Hodgson	(Prince Edward Island) Holland College
Humber Hawks	Mike Checca	Shawn Watt	Bob Meijer	Alex Kidd	Kyle Melli	Cindy Bishop	(Ontario) Humber College
Red Deer Kings	Shane Parcels	Dawson Abraham	Stephen Hood	Dylan Hoar	Garrett Olson	Brad Hamilton	(Alberta) Red Deer College
Sault Cougars	Nick Dawson	Brett Punkari	Stephane Beaulieu	Mark Dugas	Matthias Neujahr	Bob Lewis	(Ontario) Sault College
St. Clair Saints	Sean Boyle	Jordan Way	Dale Winch	Alex Zappio	Jeff Smith	Jim Brackett; Max Fusco	(Ontario) St. Clair College

=== Round-robin standings ===
Final round-robin standings

Key
Teams to Playoffs

Team	Skip	W	L
(Ontario) Fanshawe Falcons	Chris Jay	7	0
(Alberta) Red Deer Kings	Shane Parcels	5	2
(Alberta) Augustana Vikings	Kendall Warawa	5	2
(Prince Edward Island) Holland Hurricanes	Christian Tolusso	3	4
(Ontario) Fleming Knights	Jason Whitehill	3	4
(Ontario) Humber Hawks	Mike Checca	3	4
(Ontario) Sault Cougars	Nick Dawson	2	5
(Ontario) St. Clair Saints	Sean Boyle	0	7

=== Round-robin results ===
All times listed in Eastern Daylight Time.

==== Draw 1 ====
Wednesday, March 21, 8:30 am

Sheet 1	1	2	3	4	5	6	7	8	9	10	Final
(Alberta) Augustana Vikings (Warawa)	0	0	0	3	0	0	2	0	0	1	6
(Ontario) Fanshawe Falcons (Jay)	0	1	2	0	2	0	0	0	2	0	7

Sheet 6	1	2	3	4	5	6	7	8	9	10	Final
(Ontario) Fleming Knights (Whitehill)	0	1	1	1	0	0	4	2	X	X	9
(Prince Edward Island) Holland Hurricanes (Tolusso)	1	0	0	0	2	0	0	0	X	X	3

==== Draw 2 ====
Wednesday, March 21, 12:30 pm

Sheet 1	1	2	3	4	5	6	7	8	9	10	Final
(Ontario) Humber Hawks (Checca)	0	1	1	0	1	0	0	1	1	2	7
(Alberta) Red Deer Kings (Parcels)	3	0	0	0	0	1	2	0	0	0	6

Sheet 6	1	2	3	4	5	6	7	8	9	10	Final
(Ontario) Sault Cougars (Dawson)	0	2	0	2	0	0	1	0	0	2	7
(Ontario) St. Clair Saints (Boyle)	1	0	2	0	0	1	0	1	0	0	5

==== Draw 3 ====
Wednesday, March 21, 7:00 pm

Sheet 2	1	2	3	4	5	6	7	8	9	10	Final
(Ontario) Sault Cougars (Dawson)	0	0	3	1	0	0	0	1	X	X	5
(Ontario) Fleming Knights (Whitehill)	3	1	0	0	3	1	1	0	X	X	9

Sheet 3	1	2	3	4	5	6	7	8	9	10	Final
(Alberta) Augustana Vikings (Warawa)	1	1	0	1	0	1	0	2	0	1	7
(Ontario) St. Clair Saints (Boyle)	0	0	1	0	1	0	2	0	1	0	5

Sheet 4	1	2	3	4	5	6	7	8	9	10	Final
(Ontario) Humber Hawks (Checca)	1	1	0	2	0	0	1	0	X	X	5
(Prince Edward Island) Holland Hurricanes (Tolusso)	0	0	7	0	0	3	0	1	X	X	11

Sheet 5	1	2	3	4	5	6	7	8	9	10	Final
(Ontario) Fanshawe Falcons (Jay)	1	1	0	3	0	0	0	2	1	X	8
(Alberta) Red Deer Kings (Parcels)	0	0	1	0	2	1	1	0	0	X	5

==== Draw 4 ====
Thursday, March 22, 8:00 am

Sheet 2	1	2	3	4	5	6	7	8	9	10	Final
(Alberta) Augustana Vikings (Warawa)	3	1	0	3	0	0	0	0	1	1	9
(Ontario) Humber Hawks (Checca)	0	0	1	0	2	3	0	1	0	0	7

Sheet 3	1	2	3	4	5	6	7	8	9	10	Final
(Ontario) St. Clair Saints (Boyle)	0	0	1	0	0	0	1	0	X	X	2
(Prince Edward Island) Holland Hurricanes (Tolusso)	2	2	0	2	3	1	0	2	X	X	12

Sheet 4	1	2	3	4	5	6	7	8	9	10	Final
(Ontario) Fleming Knights (Whitehill)	0	2	0	0	0	0	1	0	1	0	4
(Alberta) Red Deer Kings (Parcels)	2	0	0	1	1	0	0	1	0	2	7

Sheet 5	1	2	3	4	5	6	7	8	9	10	Final
(Ontario) Sault Cougars (Dawson)	2	0	1	0	1	0	0	1	1	0	6
(Ontario) Fanshawe Falcons (Jay)	0	3	0	2	0	1	0	0	0	1	7

==== Draw 5 ====
Thursday, March 22, 12 :00 pm

Sheet 2	1	2	3	4	5	6	7	8	9	10	Final
(Prince Edward Island) Holland Hurricanes (Tolusso)	0	0	1	0	0	0	1	0	X	X	2
(Alberta) Red Deer Kings (Parcels)	1	1	0	2	1	2	0	1	X	X	8

Sheet 3	1	2	3	4	5	6	7	8	9	10	Final
(Ontario) Sault Cougars (Dawson)	0	1	1	0	0	3	0	2	0	X	7
(Alberta) Augustana Vikings (Warawa)	1	0	0	2	1	0	2	0	4	X	10

Sheet 4	1	2	3	4	5	6	7	8	9	10	Final
(Ontario) St. Clair Saints (Boyle)	1	0	0	1	0	0	1	0	2	X	5
(Ontario) Fanshawe Falcons (Jay)	0	2	0	0	2	2	0	1	0	X	7

Sheet 5	1	2	3	4	5	6	7	8	9	10	Final
(Ontario) Fleming Knights (Whitehill)	1	0	0	1	0	1	0	1	1	1	6
(Ontario) Humber Hawks (Checca)	0	2	1	0	2	0	2	0	0	0	7

==== Draw 6 ====
Thursday, March 22, 4:30 pm

Sheet 1	1	2	3	4	5	6	7	8	9	10	Final
(Prince Edward Island) Holland Hurricanes (Tolusso)	2	0	1	0	1	0	1	0	0	2	7
(Ontario) Sault Cougars (Dawson)	0	0	0	3	0	1	0	1	1	0	6

Sheet 6	1	2	3	4	5	6	7	8	9	10	Final
(Alberta) Red Deer Kings (Parcels)	0	0	0	1	3	0	3	0	1	3	11
(Alberta) Augustana Vikings (Warawa)	0	0	3	0	0	2	0	1	0	0	6

==== Draw 7 ====
Thursday, March 22, 8:30 pm

Sheet 1	1	2	3	4	5	6	7	8	9	10	Final
(Ontario) St. Clair Saints (Boyle)	0	1	0	0	1	0	1	0	X	X	3
(Ontario) Fleming Knights (Whitehill)	3	0	2	1	0	1	0	2	X	X	9

Sheet 6	1	2	3	4	5	6	7	8	9	10	Final
(Ontario) Fanshawe Falcons (Jay)	1	1	0	0	1	0	1	0	2	1	7
(Ontario) Humber Hawks (Checca)	0	0	0	1	0	2	0	1	0	0	4

==== Draw 9 ====
Friday, March 23, 11:30 am

Sheet 2	1	2	3	4	5	6	7	8	9	10	Final
(Ontario) Humber Hawks (Checca)	0	0	1	0	2	0	0	1	0	2	6
(Ontario) St. Clair Saints (Boyle)	0	1	0	1	0	1	1	0	1	0	5

Sheet 3	1	2	3	4	5	6	7	8	9	10	11	Final
(Ontario) Fanshawe Falcons (Jay)	0	0	0	1	0	0	1	0	2	1	1	6
(Prince Edward Island) Holland Hurricanes (Tolusso)	1	0	1	0	1	1	0	1	0	0	0	5

Sheet 4	1	2	3	4	5	6	7	8	9	10	Final
(Alberta) Red Deer Kings (Parcels)	1	0	2	0	0	0	2	0	0	X	5
(Ontario) Sault Cougars (Dawson)	0	1	0	0	0	1	0	1	1	X	4

Sheet 5	1	2	3	4	5	6	7	8	9	10	Final
(Alberta) Augustana Vikings (Warawa)	1	0	5	0	0	3	2	0	X	X	11
(Ontario) Fleming Knights (Whitehill)	0	1	0	1	1	0	0	1	X	X	4

==== Draw 10 ====
Friday, March 23, 3:30 pm

Sheet 2	1	2	3	4	5	6	7	8	9	10	Final
(Ontario) Fleming Knights (Whitehill)	0	0	2	0	2	0	1	0	X	X	5
(Ontario) Fanshawe Falcons (Jay)	2	2	0	3	0	2	0	2	X	X	11

Sheet 3	1	2	3	4	5	6	7	8	9	10	Final
(Ontario) Humber Hawks (Checca)	1	0	1	1	0	1	0	0	0	0	4
(Ontario) Sault Cougars (Dawson)	0	1	0	0	1	0	2	1	1	1	7

Sheet 4	1	2	3	4	5	6	7	8	9	10	Final
(Prince Edward Island) Holland Hurricanes (Tolusso)	0	0	0	2	0	0	1	1	X	X	4
(Alberta) Augustana Vikings (Warawa)	1	3	4	0	0	1	0	0	X	X	9

Sheet 5	1	2	3	4	5	6	7	8	9	10	Final
(Alberta) Red Deer Kings (Parcels)	0	0	3	0	1	0	3	0	6	X	13
(Ontario) St. Clair Saints (Boyle)	1	2	0	0	0	1	0	2	0	X	6

=== Playoffs ===
Semifinal			Final
			1	(Ontario) Fanshawe Falcons	5
2	(Alberta) Red Deer Kings	9	2	(Alberta) Red Deer Kings	4
3	(Alberta) Augustana Vikings	4

==== Semifinal ====
Saturday, March 24, 12:00 pm

Sheet 3	1	2	3	4	5	6	7	8	9	10	Final
(Alberta) Red Deer Kings (Parcels)	1	0	5	0	0	2	1	0	X	X	9
(Alberta) Augustana Vikings (Warawa)	0	1	0	1	1	0	0	1	X	X	4

==== Final ====
Saturday, March 24, 4:00 pm

Sheet 4	1	2	3	4	5	6	7	8	9	10	Final
(Ontario) Fanshawe Falcons (Jay)	0	1	0	0	0	1	1	0	0	2	5
(Alberta) Red Deer Kings (Abraham)	0	0	0	1	1	0	0	2	0	0	4

== Women ==
=== Teams ===
The teams are listed as follows:

Team	Skip	Third	Second	Lead	Alternate	Coach(es)	University
Fanshawe Falcons	Chantal Lalonde	Kaitlyn Knipe	Cassie Savage	Jordan Ariss	Yvonne Lalonde	Barry Westman; Shirley Westman	(Ontario) Fanshawe College
Fleming Knights	Alyssa Cornelius	Vanessa Korpi	Kendra Brunton	Ann Cornish	Jaclyn Carr	Tara Welbourn	(Ontario) Fleming College
Grande Prairie Wolves	Stephanie Yanishewski	Sarah Balderston	Victoria Yanishewski	Sydni Drysdale	Jaymee Sluggett	Kurt Balderston; Caryl Sallows	(Alberta) Grande Prairie Regional College
Humber Hawks	Laura Hickey	Rebecca Duck	Brooke Curtis	Desiree Davis	Mackenzie Briand; Maria Christina DeRose	Cindy Bishop	(Ontario) Humber College
Mohawk Mountaineers	Sarah McFarlene	Jennifer Montgomery	Christine Moore	Sandra Toole		Matthew Kimbler; Betty Wackley	(Ontario) Mohawk College
NAIT Ooks	Brittany Whittemore	Dallas Luschyk	Allison Mack	Jennifer Davis	Allison Routhier	Jules Owchar	Northern Alberta Institute of Technology
Sault Cougars	Michelle MacLeod	Jessica Merrifield	Kelly Gibson	Jodi Gillespie	Laura Lehto	Rejeanne MacLeod	(Ontario) Sault College
Seneca Sting	Kirsti Davis	Amanda Gates	Joan Moore	Megan Van Huyse	Tameka Vaters	Angela James	(Ontario) Seneca College

=== Round-robin standings ===
Final round-robin standings

Key
Teams to Playoffs

Team	Skip	W	L
(Ontario) Fanshawe Falcons	Chantal Lalonde	6	1
(Alberta) NAIT Ooks	Brittany Whittemore	5	2
(Alberta) Grande Prairie Wolves	Stephanie Yanishewski	5	2
(Ontario) Humber Hawks	Laura Hickey	4	3
(Ontario) Mohawk Mountaineers	Sarah McFarlene	4	3
(Ontario) Seneca Sting	Kirsti Davis	3	4
(Ontario) Sault Cougars	Michelle MacLeod	1	6
(Ontario) Fleming Knights	Alyssa Cornelius	0	7

=== Round-robin results ===
All times listed in Eastern Daylight Time.

==== Draw 1 ====
Wednesday, March 21, 8:30 am

Sheet 2	1	2	3	4	5	6	7	8	9	10	Final
(Ontario) Fanshawe Falcons (Lalonde)	0	1	2	0	5	0	2	0	X	X	10
(Ontario) Mohawk Mountaineers (McFarlene)	0	0	0	1	0	1	0	0	X	X	2

Sheet 3	1	2	3	4	5	6	7	8	9	10	Final
(Ontario) Humber Hawks (Hickey)	1	0	0	0	0	2	1	0	0	0	4
(Ontario) Seneca Sting (Davis)	0	2	0	0	2	0	0	0	0	4	8

Sheet 4	1	2	3	4	5	6	7	8	9	10	Final
(Alberta) Grande Prairie Wolves (Yanishewski)	0	1	0	2	0	0	2	0	2	0	7
(Alberta) NAIT Ooks (Whittemore)	0	0	2	0	2	0	0	1	0	4	9

Sheet 5	1	2	3	4	5	6	7	8	9	10	Final
(Ontario) Sault Cougars (MacLeod)	1	5	0	2	0	2	0	2	X	X	12
(Ontario) Fleming Knights (Cornelius)	0	0	1	0	1	0	1	0	X	X	3

==== Draw 2 ====
Wednesday, March 21, 12:30 pm

Sheet 2	1	2	3	4	5	6	7	8	9	10	Final
(Ontario) Humber Hawks (Hickey)	3	0	2	0	2	1	0	1	X	X	9
(Alberta) NAIT Ooks (Whittemore)	0	2	0	1	0	0	1	0	X	X	4

Sheet 3	1	2	3	4	5	6	7	8	9	10	Final
(Ontario) Sault Cougars (MacLeod)	0	2	0	1	0	0	1	0	X	X	4
(Ontario) Fanshawe Falcons (Lalonde)	5	0	3	0	0	3	0	2	X	X	13

Sheet 4	1	2	3	4	5	6	7	8	9	10	Final
(Ontario) Seneca Sting (Davis)	3	0	0	5	0	0	3	0	0	1	12
(Ontario) Fleming Knights (Cornelius)	0	2	0	0	2	1	0	1	1	0	7

Sheet 5	1	2	3	4	5	6	7	8	9	10	Final
(Alberta) Grande Prairie Wolves (Yanishewski)	4	0	0	0	0	2	0	1	0	X	7
(Ontario) Mohawk Mountaineers (McFarlene)	0	2	1	3	1	0	2	0	2	X	11

==== Draw 4 ====
Thursday, March 22, 8:00 am

Sheet 1	1	2	3	4	5	6	7	8	9	10	Final
(Ontario) Fanshawe Falcons (Lalonde)	1	0	1	0	4	0	2	3	X	X	11
(Ontario) Fleming Knights (Cornelius)	0	1	0	0	0	2	0	0	X	X	3

Sheet 6	1	2	3	4	5	6	7	8	9	10	Final
(Alberta) Grande Prairie Wolves (Yanishewski)	2	2	0	3	2	0	1	0	X	X	10
(Ontario) Humber Hawks (Hickey)	0	0	2	0	0	1	0	1	X	X	4

==== Draw 5 ====
Thursday, March 22, 12:00 pm

Sheet 1	1	2	3	4	5	6	7	8	9	10	Final
(Ontario) Mohawk Mountaineers (McFarlene)	0	0	2	0	2	0	1	1	1	X	7
(Alberta) NAIT Ooks (Whittemore)	1	2	0	5	0	1	0	0	0	X	9

Sheet 6	1	2	3	4	5	6	7	8	9	10	Final
(Ontario) Sault Cougars (MacLeod)	2	0	0	1	0	0	1	0	2	0	6
(Ontario) Seneca Sting (Davis)	0	1	2	0	1	1	0	1	0	2	8

==== Draw 6 ====
Thursday, March 22, 4:30 pm

Sheet 2	1	2	3	4	5	6	7	8	9	10	Final
(Ontario) Seneca Sting (Davis)	0	0	0	0	1	1	0	0	X	X	2
(Ontario) Mohawk Mountaineers (McFarlene)	1	1	2	0	0	0	1	3	X	X	8

Sheet 3	1	2	3	4	5	6	7	8	9	10	Final
(Ontario) Fleming Knights (Cornelius)	0	0	1	0	2	0	0	0	X	X	3
(Ontario) Humber Hawks (Hickey)	1	2	0	3	0	3	1	1	X	X	11

Sheet 4	1	2	3	4	5	6	7	8	9	10	Final
(Alberta) NAIT Ooks (Whittemore)	3	0	2	0	0	3	1	0	1	X	10
(Ontario) Sault Cougars (MacLeod)	0	1	0	1	3	0	0	2	0	X	7

Sheet 5	1	2	3	4	5	6	7	8	9	10	Final
(Ontario) Fanshawe Falcons (Lalonde)	0	0	0	0	1	1	0	0	0	X	2
(Alberta) Grande Prairie Wolves (Yanishewski)	0	0	1	2	0	0	1	1	2	X	7

==== Draw 7 ====
Thursday, March 22, 8:30 pm

Sheet 2	1	2	3	4	5	6	7	8	9	10	Final
(Alberta) Grande Prairie Wolves (Yanishewski)	2	0	0	0	0	4	0	3	0	0	9
(Ontario) Fleming Knights (Cornelius)	0	1	0	1	1	0	2	0	2	1	8

Sheet 3	1	2	3	4	5	6	7	8	9	10	Final
(Ontario) Mohawk Mountaineers (McFarlene)	0	0	3	0	1	1	0	2	0	1	8
(Ontario) Sault Cougars (MacLeod)	1	1	0	2	0	0	2	0	1	0	7

Sheet 4	1	2	3	4	5	6	7	8	9	10	Final
(Ontario) Humber Hawks (Hickey)	0	1	0	0	2	0	0	1	0	X	4
(Ontario) Fanshawe Falcons (Lalonde)	2	0	1	1	0	0	4	0	0	X	8

Sheet 5	1	2	3	4	5	6	7	8	9	10	Final
(Alberta) NAIT Ooks (Whittemore)	0	1	0	2	2	2	0	1	3	X	11
(Ontario) Seneca Sting (Davis)	2	0	4	0	0	0	1	0	0	X	7

==== Draw 8 ====
Friday, March 23, 7:30 am

Sheet 2	1	2	3	4	5	6	7	8	9	10	Final
(Ontario) Sault Cougars (MacLeod)	1	0	0	0	0	1	0	0	X	X	2
(Alberta) Grande Prairie Wolves (Yanishewski)	0	3	2	1	3	0	2	1	X	X	12

Sheet 3	1	2	3	4	5	6	7	8	9	10	Final
(Ontario) Fanshawe Falcons (Lalonde)	1	0	0	1	0	0	2	0	1	1	6
(Ontario) Seneca Sting (Davis)	0	0	1	0	0	1	0	1	0	0	3

Sheet 4	1	2	3	4	5	6	7	8	9	10	Final
(Ontario) Mohawk Mountaineers (McFarlene)	0	1	0	2	0	2	0	0	X	X	5
(Ontario) Humber Hawks (Hickey)	3	0	2	0	2	0	2	1	X	X	10

Sheet 5	1	2	3	4	5	6	7	8	9	10	Final
(Ontario) Fleming Knights (Cornelius)	0	2	1	0	0	0	0	1	X	X	4
(Alberta) NAIT Ooks (Whittemore)	2	0	0	3	1	4	0	0	X	X	10

==== Draw 9 ====
Friday, March 23, 11:30 am

Sheet 1	1	2	3	4	5	6	7	8	9	10	Final
(Ontario) Humber Hawks (Hickey)	2	0	0	1	0	0	1	0	5	X	9
(Ontario) Sault Cougars (MacLeod)	0	0	1	0	2	1	0	1	0	X	5

Sheet 6	1	2	3	4	5	6	7	8	9	10	11	Final
(Alberta) NAIT Ooks (Whittemore)	0	4	0	2	0	0	2	0	1	0	0	9
(Ontario) Fanshawe Falcons (Lalonde)	3	0	1	0	1	0	0	3	0	1	2	11

==== Draw 10 ====
Friday, March 23, 3:30 pm

Sheet 1	1	2	3	4	5	6	7	8	9	10	Final
(Ontario) Seneca Sting (Davis)	0	0	2	0	0	0	0	0	X	X	2
(Alberta) Grande Prairie Wolves (Yanishewski)	1	3	0	0	1	3	4	0	X	X	12

Sheet 6	1	2	3	4	5	6	7	8	9	10	Final
(Ontario) Fleming Knights (Cornelius)	0	0	0	0	1	0	0	0	X	X	1
(Ontario) Mohawk Mountaineers (McFarlene)	2	2	2	1	0	2	4	0	X	X	13

=== Playoffs ===
Semifinal			Final
			1	(Ontario) Fanshawe Falcons	6
2	(Alberta) NAIT Ooks	3	3	(Alberta) Grande Prairie Wolves	4
3	(Alberta) Grande Prairie Wolves	12

==== Semifinal ====
Saturday, March 24, 12:00 pm

Sheet 5	1	2	3	4	5	6	7	8	9	10	Final
(Alberta) NAIT Ooks (Whittemore)	0	1	1	0	0	0	1	0	X	X	3
(Alberta) Grande Prairie Wolves (Yanishewski)	3	0	0	3	2	4	0	0	X	X	12

==== Final ====
Saturday, March 24, 4:00 pm

Sheet 2	1	2	3	4	5	6	7	8	9	10	Final
(Ontario) Fanshawe Falcons (Lalonde)	0	2	0	1	0	0	1	1	0	1	6
(Alberta) Grande Prairie Wolves (Yanishewski)	0	0	1	0	0	2	0	0	1	0	4

== Awards ==
The all-star teams and award winners are as follows:

=== CCAA Curling All-Star Teams ===
Women

- Skip: Chantal Lalonde, Fanshawe College
- Third: Cassie Savage, Fanshawe College
- Second: Kaitlyn Knipe, Fanshawe College
- Lead: Jordan Ariss, Fanshawe College

Men

- Skip: Shane Parcels, Red Deer College
- Third: D.J. Ronaldson, Fanshawe College
- Second: Stephen Hood, Red Deer College
- Lead: Mark Dugas, Sault College

=== CCAA Curling Fair Play Awards ===
Men

- Chris Jay, Fanshawe College

Women

- Alyssa Cornelius, Fleming College
