= Canadian Collegiate Athletic Association Soccer National Championships =

CCAA National Championship
- Organiser(s): CCAA
- Founded: 1983 (men's); 1991 (women's)
- Region: Canada
- Teams: 8 (men's); 8 (women's)
- Website: men's women's

The Soccer National Championship is the playoff tournament to determine the collegiate national champions in women's and men's soccer. It is organized by the Canadian Collegiate Athletic Association (CCAA).

== List of men's results ==
Year	Winner	Runner-up	Third place	Host
1983	Malaspina	Seneca	Capilano	Capilano
1984	Seneca	Ahuntsic	Dawson	Seneca
1985	Seneca	Dawson	Capilano	Dawson
1986	Seneca	Capilano	NAIT	MacEwan
1987	NAIT	Seneca	Durham	Vanier
1988	Capilano	Ahuntsic	NAIT	Malaspina
1989	Mohawk	Capilano	Ahuntsic	SAIT
1990	Capilano	Sheridan	Ahuntsic	NSAC
1991	Capilano	Mount Royal	John Abbott	Grandby H.Y.
1992	VCC	N/A	Sheridan	UCC
1993	VCC	Fanshawe	Ahuntsic	Conestoga
1994	Mount Royal	Humber	Vanier	Dawson
1995	Humber	Mount Royal	UFV	Medicine Hat
1996	Capilano	Fanshawe	Mount Royal	Royal Military
1997	Mount Royal	Ahuntsic	Langara	John Abbott
1998	UCC	Malaspina	Humber	UCC
1999	Langara	Algonquin	Durham	Durham
2000	Langara	John Abbott	Humber	Langara
2001	Humber	Langara	NAIT	Medicine Hat
2002	Algonquin	Douglas	Garneau	John Abbott
2003	Capilano	Seneca	Douglas	Douglas
2004	Mount Royal	Algonquin	John Abbott	Fanshawe
2005	Douglas	Algonquin	NAIT	Langara
2006	Algonquin	Saint-Lambert	MacEwan	Langara
2007	St. Lambert	Algonquin	Mount Royal	MSVU
2008	Capilano	Algonquin	Concordia	TRU
2009	Seneca	F.X.Garneau	Douglas	Seneca
2010	VIU	NAIT	Humber	NAIT
2011	NAIT	Holland	VIU	F.X.Garneau
2012	Humber	VIU	Garneau	Douglas
2013	Humber	TRU	Douglas	UNBSJ
2014	Sheridan	VIU	Garneau	Sheridan
2015	Humber	Capilano	Algonquin	Saint-Lambert
2016	Humber	Keyano	Capilano	Keyano
2017	VIU	Douglas	Holland	VIU
2018	Humber	Ahuntsic	Sheridan	Holland
2019	Durham	VIU	Ch. Saint-Lambert	Durham
2021	Humber	Douglas	NAIT	SAIT
2022	Humber	Seneca	Montmorency	Langara
2023	Douglas	Conestoga	St. Clair	St. Clair
2024	Humber	Algonquin	Ch. Saint-Lambert	St. Thomas
2025	Humber	Ch. Saint-Lambert	NAIT	Ch. Saint-Lambert
2026	Humber	Ch. Saint-Lambert	VIU	NAIT
2027				Brandon

== List of women's results ==
Year	Winner	Runner-up	Third place	Host
1991	VCC	Sherbrooke	John Abbott	Fanshawe
1992	John Abbott	VCC	Sherbrooke	John Abbott
1993	Malaspina	Sherbrooke	UFV	Malaspina
1994	Lethbridge	Langara	UFV	UFV
1995	Capilano	UCC	Medicine Hat	Medicine Hat
1996	Capilano	UCC	Mount Royal	Royal Military
1997	John Abbott	Capilano	MacEwan	Dawson
1998	Capilano	UCC	John Abbott	UCC
1999	UCC	Medicine Hat	Trois-Rivieres	Durham
2000	Capilano	F.X.Garneau	Humber	Langara
2001	Capilano	John Abbott	Mount Royal	Medicine Hat
2002	F.X.Garneau	UCC	SAIT	Dawson
2003	F.X.Garneau	UCC	Mount Royal	UFV
2004	F.X.Garneau	Mount Royal	MSVU	Fanshawe
2005	Langara	F.X.Garneau	MacEwan	Langara
2006	Langara	TRU	F.X.Garneau	Langara
2007	F.X.Garneau	Mount Royal	Durham	MSVU
2008	Langara	TRU	Humber	TRU
2009	Concordia	Fanshawe	Kwantlen	Humber
2010	F.X.Garneau	NAIT	Humber	NAIT
2011	F.X.Garneau	NAIT	Ahuntsic	F.X.Garneau
2012	Ahuntsic	Concordia	NAIT	Holland
2013	MacEwan	Garneau	TRU	Kwantlen
2014	Garneau	NAIT	Seneca	Medicine Hat
2015	Garneau	NAIT	Ahuntsic	Fleming
2016	Garneau	Ahuntsic	Douglas	Ahuntsic
2017	Garneau	Ch. Saint-Lambert	Algonquin	Dal AC & UKC
2018	Ch. Saint-Lambert	Garneau	Fanshawe	Douglas
2019	Sainte-Foy	VIU	Ch. Saint-Lambert	CUE
2021	Vanier	Sainte-Foy	SAIT	Humber
2022	Ahuntsic	Ch. Saint-Lambert	VIU	Ch. Saint-Lambert
2023	Seneca	Sainte-Foy	Holland College	Holland
2024	Montmorency	Ahuntsic	Capilano	Capilano
2025	Ahuntsic	Garneau	Red Deer	Red Deer
2026	Ahuntsic	VIU	Vanier	Conestoga
2027				TBD
