= Olga Hrycak =

Canadian basketball player and coach (born 1947)

- Born: 1947 (age 78–79); Montreal, Quebec, Canada
- Education: University of Montreal
- Occupations: Basketball player Basketball university coach
- Years active: 1977–2015
- Awards: Canada Basketball Hall of Fame

Olga Hrycak (born 1947) is a Canadian former basketball player and basketball university coach. She was a provincial championship winning coach for the Champlain College Saint-Lambert Cavaliers men's team in 1981, and worked on the staff of the Canada national men's team from 1984 to 1987, firstly as an apprentice coach and then as assistant coach. Hrycak went on to coach the Dawson College Blues to a Canadian collegiate record nine provincial men's basketball titles between 1988 and 2003. She became the first female men's university basketball coach in either Canada or the United States when she was made the first coach of the UQAM Citadins men's basketball squad. Hrycak coached the team from 2006 to 2010 Réseau du sport étudiant du Québec (RSEQ) provincial titles before retiring from in 2015. She is a two-time CCAA Men's Basketball Coach of the Year and is an inductee of both the Canada Basketball Hall of Fame and the CCAA Hall of Fame. Inducted into the Quebec Sports Hall of Fame November 2022.

== Biography ==
Hrycak was born in Montreal in 1947. She began coaching high school basketball for female teams at Holy Names High School at Sir George Williams University and Marianopolis College in 1967, while finishing her physical education studies as a student-athlete at the University of Montreal in the late 1960s. Hrycak went on to coach boys' teams when boys were admitted to Holy Names High School from 1977. In 1979, she progressed to the CEGEP level, being appointed head coach of the Champlain College Saint-Lambert Cavaliers men's squad and she remained in the role until 1988. Hrycak coached the team to victory in the 1981 Canadian Collegiate Athletic Association (CCAA) provincial championship and second place in the national competition that same year. In 1984, she joined the Canada national men's team as apprentice coach to Jack Donohue for the 1984 Summer Olympics in Los Angeles. She was one of the first women to play a role in a men's Olympic coaching staff, and helped the side finish fourth. Hrycak being made assistant coach with the side between 1985 and 1987 as it toured Europe in preparation for the 1988 Summer Olympics in Seoul, becoming the first woman to act as an assistant to the Canadian men's national basketball team.

In 1988, she was appointed coach of the Dawson College Blues and remained in the post until 2003. Hrycak coached the team to a total of a Canadian collegiate record nine provincial men's basketball titles and led the squad to three consecutive CCAA silver medals from 1998 to 2000 and a bronze medal in 1992. In her final six years of coach of the Dawson College Blues, 27 out of 35 former players went on to compete for university teams and some were on American athletic scholarships. In 2003, the UQAM and Hrycak established a basketball program, and she was employed as the first head coach of the UQAM Citadins men's basketball team. This made her the first woman to coach a men's university basketball team in either Canada or the United States. Under Hrycak's direction, the team won 300 games and the 2006 and 2010 Réseau du sport étudiant du Québec (RSEQ) provincial championships despite having difficulty locating players for the squad since basketball was not popular in French-language high schools and CEGEPs. Until late 2013, she remained the only female college men's basketball team coach in North America and retired in April 2015, as a result of health reasons caused a poor back.

Throughout her career, Hrycak sat on various boards. She was on the board of the Greater Montreal Athletics Association and RSEQ and chaired Basketball Quebec's board. Hrycak represented Quebec on the board of directors of Canada Basketball as vice-chair of athlete development and consulted many Quebec schools. She was also unanimously elected the only woman to the technical committee of FIBA for three years and was chef de mission of Canada Basketball.

== Personality ==
Antoine Deshaies of Ici Radio-Canada describes Hrycak as "a rather small woman, but animated by an inexhaustible thirst for victories. Her instructions, shouted with vigor to young men quite taller than she physically, dominated all other sounds of the gymnasiums she attended." She helped players from underprivileged backgrounds find employment for the middle of the year and get a balanced diet but treated all equally regardless of their status.

== Honours ==
In 1991 and 1997, Hrycak was named CCAA Men's Basketball Coach of the Year. She received the Coaching Association of Canada's Élaine-Tanguay Award in 2003, the Thérèse-Daviau Award from the City of Montreal in 2005 and the Woman of Influence in Sport and Physical Activity in Quebec Award in 2010. Hrycak was given the UQAM Medal in 2015 and the Tribute Award from the Fondation de l'athlète d'excellence du Québec in 2016. In May 2017, she was inducted into the Canada Basketball Hall of Fame as a builder. Hrycak was added to the CCAA Hall of Fame the following year, and won the 2020 Women in Distinction Award in the Sports, Health and Wellness category from the Women's Y Foundation.
