= Concordia High School (Edmonton) =

Coordinates: 53.5613°N 113.4475°W

- Edmonton Alberta; Canada

Information
- Type: Private
- Motto: Initium Sapientiae Timor Domini (The fear of the Lord is the beginning of wisdom)
- Established: 1921
- Closed: 2012
- Grades: 9-12
- Colors: blue and gold

Concordia High School, originally named Concordia College, and subsequently Concordia College High School until 1997, was created with the purpose of preparing young men to attend the Lutheran Seminary in St. Louis, Missouri. Once ordained, they would return to the Canadian Prairies to open up new Lutheran churches. Concordia was established in 1921 with a first class of eighth grade boys. In the 1940s the school became co-ed and became an academic prep school. After World War II the high school continued as a grade nine to twelve program.

In 1987 Concordia University College of Alberta was granted degree-granting status. The history and growth of the university are largely attributed to a small academic high school that gradually added junior college courses to its program, eventually evolving into a full-fledged university college on the same campus and gradually replacing the original high school program. Many students as a matter of course received their high school diploma and took university courses at Concordia until either graduation or in order to transfer to the University of Alberta. Some of the university faculty were also former students or teachers at the high school.

In 2000 the high school program was fully detached from the university program. Concordia High School was incorporated as a separate entity with its own board of governors separate from the governance of the university. In 1997 the high school moved to the north edge of campus at 112 Avenue and 73 Street in Edmonton, where it remained for 14 years.

In July 2011 Concordia High School moved to 830 Saddleback Road (the former Taylor College and Seminary campus) in the south end of Edmonton. Concordia High School permanently closed on August 20, 2012. The school's board of governors issued a statement saying they had been informed, in an unanticipated development, that the facility lease would not be renewed and that they had been unable to find an alternative facility for dormitory and classroom space; however, the landlord company stated that the school had defaulted on its lease in January 2012, and the lease was later terminated when the school informed the landlord that they were insolvent and would not open for the 2012–13 school year.

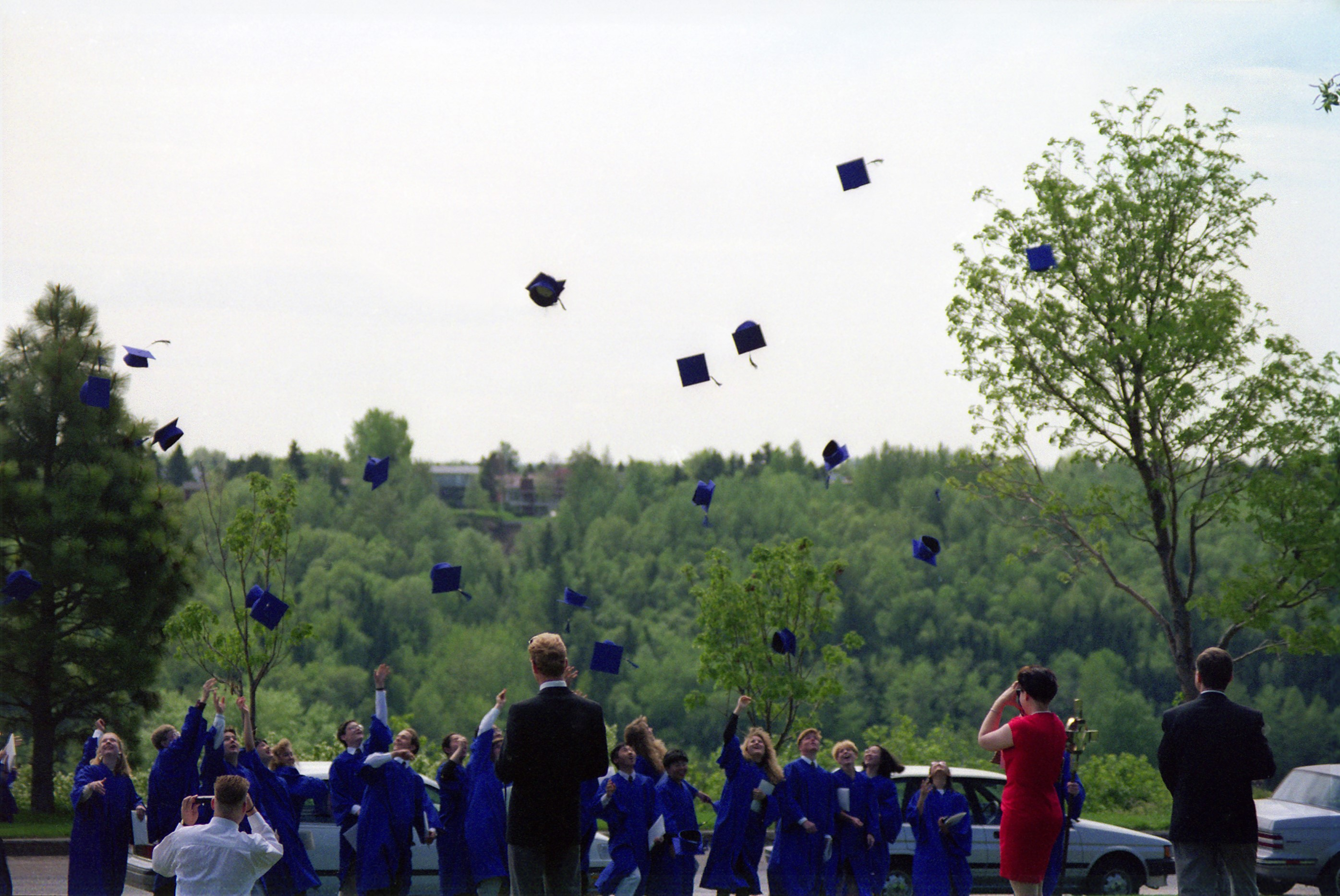
Graduation Ceremonies at Concordia High School, May 1991
