= Douglas College =

Public college in British Columbia, Canada

- Type: Public college
- Established: 1970; 56 years ago
- Academic affiliations: CICan, CBIE, CUP
- Endowment: $72,075,744
- Chair: Adel Gamar
- President: Kathy Denton
- Provost: Thor Borgford
- Academic staff: 960
- Students: 8,449 FTE (2024-25 FTE)
- Location: New Westminster and Coquitlam, British Columbia, Canada
- Campus: Urban (New Westminster) Suburban (Coquitlam)
- Colours: Black, green, silver
- Nickname: Royals
- Sporting affiliations: PACWEST, CCAA, NWAACC
- Mascot: Roary
- Website: www.douglascollege.ca

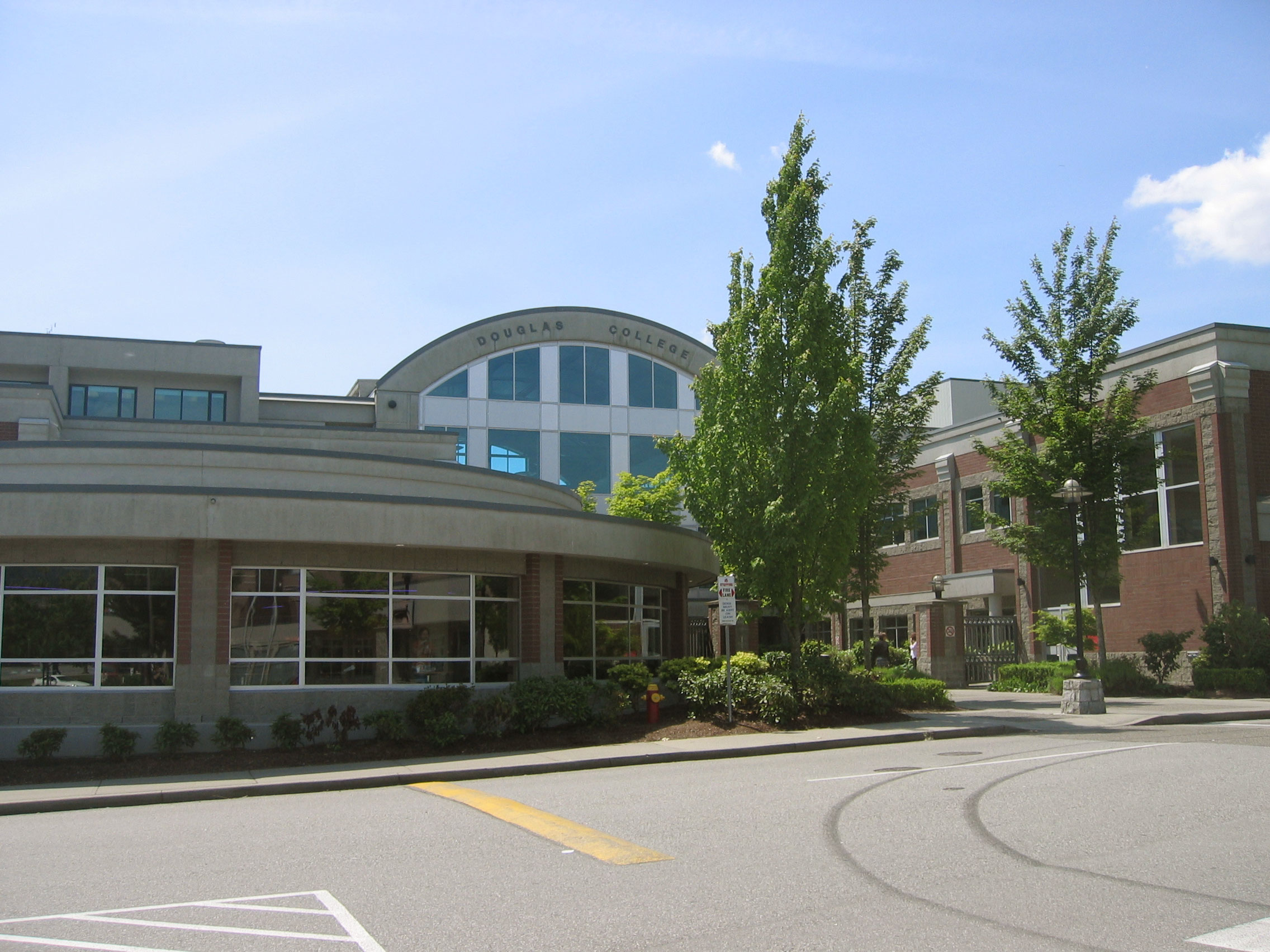
Coquitlam Campus

Douglas College is the largest college in British Columbia, Canada with 7,958 full-time equivalent students in 2023-24. Douglas College offers bachelor's degrees and general university arts and science courses, as well as career programs in health care, human services, business and the creative arts.

== History ==
Founded in 1970, the college is named after the former Governor of British Columbia, Sir James Douglas. In 1981, Kwantlen College split off from Douglas College.

=== Coat of arms ===
Douglas College's coat of arms was revealed to the public on January 21, 2020. The emblem was designed by Coast Salish artist Carrielynn Victor for the college's 50th anniversary. The emblem was the first to be completely designed by an Indigenous artist in Canada's history. The crowned heart in the middle of the emblem is a feature of coats of arms of the Douglas family, including the College's namesake Sir James Douglas, and a reference to the college's motto, "Do what you love". The crown on top of it is made of cedar, a wood material that is local to the area. There is a raven on top of the crest, meant to signify cleverness as the bird represents. There are also two Douglas fir trees surrounding the raven which are meant to signify a relation to the college's name. In the Coast Salish language, below the shield, are the words "Excellence, Knowledge, Passion". The reference to the Indigenous language is a recognition that the college operates on a First Nations territory.

=== Campuses ===
The college has two major campuses in Metro Vancouver – one in New Westminster (Royal Avenue and Anvil Tower) and one in Coquitlam. The college also has a smaller Training Centre campus in Surrey.

== Programs ==
Douglas offers bachelor's degrees, associated degrees, and various programs, certifications and diplomas.

=== International education ===
Each year, more than 4,000 international students from 92 countries take for-credit courses at Douglas College, accounting for roughly 18 percent of the student population.

=== Media ===
The Other Press was formerly the Douglas College's student newspaper from 1976 to 2021. It was a member of Canadian University Press.

The college also publishes Event, a literary magazine published three times per year.

=== Athletics ===
Varsity sports teams at Douglas College are known as the Royals and the mascot is a lion named Roary. The Royals compete in men's and women's basketball, curling, golf, soccer and volleyball as well as men's baseball and women's softball. The Royals are members of the Canadian Collegiate Athletic Association (CCAA), the Pacific Western Athletic Association (PACWEST) and the Northwest Athletic Conference (NWAC).

== Controversy ==
In January 2012, Global's 16x9 news magazine aired a story alleging large scale fraud at Douglas College's Chinese partner campuses. Some faculty members complained that some Chinese students were unable to speak basic English upon graduation. They alleged mass-scale fraud whereby students were guaranteed to pass their courses through various methods such as black market answer sheets, progressively easier make-up exams, and grade tampering. Robert Buller, a former Dean of Commerce and Business alleged Douglas College President Scott McAlpine said "he needed plausible deniability and he wanted to see and hear nothing" when approached about the issue. Since then, Douglas College and the British Columbia Ministry of Advanced Education completed an independent review of the situation and issued a report. Although the report found "no evidence of academic dishonesty or fraud in the conduct of Douglas College", it noted specific areas of concerns including in lack of oversight in the use of challenge exams. The report stated that "Douglas College would have benefitted from speedier and more thoroughly considered responses" to issues previously identified.

== Notable alumni ==
- Elizabeth Bachinsky, poet
- N. Robin Crossby, game designer
- Frank Giustra, businessman and philanthropist
- Terry Glavin, author and journalist
- Adrian Holmes, actor
- Daniel Igali, Olympic gold medallist wrestler
- Wanda John-Kehewin, author and poet
- Farhan Lalji, sports reporter
- Sky Lee, author
- Lance Ryan, opera vocalist

== See also ==
- The Other Press
- List of colleges and universities named after people
- Douglass College, similarly titled but different college part of Rutgers University
