= 2026 U Sports/Curling Canada University Curling Championships =

2026 U Sports/Curling Canada Championships
- Host city: Regina, Saskatchewan
- Arena: Callie Curling Club
- Dates: February 17–21
- Men's winner: (Alberta) Calgary Dinos
- Curling club: The Glencoe Club, Calgary
- Skip: Kenan Wipf
- Third: Ky Macaulay
- Second: Ethan Drysdale
- Lead: Spencer Else
- Coach: Mickey Pendergast
- Finalist: (Ontario) Carleton Ravens (Nicholls)
- Women's winner: (Newfoundland and Labrador) Memorial Sea-Hawks
- Curling club: St. John's, St. John's
- Skip: Cailey Locke
- Third: Hayley Gushue
- Second: Emily Neary
- Lead: Sitaye Penney
- Coach: Jeff Thomas
- Finalist: (Ontario) McMaster Marauders (Fitzgerald)

The 2026 U Sports/Curling Canada University Championships were held from February 17 to 21 at the Callie Curling Club in Regina, Saskatchewan. The host university of the event was the University of Saskatchewan. The event was held in conjunction with the 2026 CCAA/Curling Canada College Curling Championships, the Canadian college curling championship.

The winning teams will represent Canada at the 2027 Winter World University Games.

== Men ==
=== Qualification ===
The following universities qualified to participate in the 2026 U Sports/Curling Canada University Curling Championships:

Region	Vacancies	Qualified
Host	1	(Saskatchewan) Regina Cougars
Canada West Universities Athletic Association	2	Calgary Dinos; Alberta Golden Bears
Ontario University Athletics	3	(Ontario) Wilfrid Laurier Golden Hawks (Ontario) Carleton Ravens (Ontario) York Lions
Atlantic University Sport	2	(Newfoundland and Labrador) Memorial Sea-Hawks (Nova Scotia) Dalhousie Tigers
TOTAL	8	

=== Teams ===
The teams are listed as follows:

Team	Skip	Third	Second	Lead	Alternate	University
Alberta Golden Bears	Zach Davies	Ronan Peterson	William Butler	Adam Naugler	Peter Hlushak	University of Alberta
Calgary Dinos	Kenan Wipf	Ky Macaulay	Ethan Drysdale	Spencer Else		(Alberta) University of Calgary
Carleton Ravens	Owen Nicholls	Jordan McNamara	Jack Ragan	Jacob Clarke	Philip Burgess	(Ontario) Carleton University
Dalhousie Tigers	Caelan McPherson (Fourth)	Owen McPherson (Skip)	Alan Fawcett	Aidan MacDonald	Tyler McMullen	(Nova Scotia) Dalhousie University
Memorial Sea-Hawks	Simon Perry	Nicholas Codner	Brayden Snow	Carter Holden	Sean O'Leary	(Newfoundland and Labrador) Memorial University of Newfoundland
Regina Cougars	Carter Williamson	Rhett Wittmire	Andrew Moulding	Nathan Weiss	Evan Arnold	(Saskatchewan) University of Regina
Wilfrid Laurier Golden Hawks	Kibo Mulima	Landan Rooney	Wyatt Small	Wyatt Wright	Nathan Kim	(Ontario) Wilfrid Laurier University
York Lions	Ryan Mayville	Craig Glassford	Daniel Del Conte	Ethen Peter		(Ontario) York University

=== Round robin standings ===
Final Round Robin Standings

Key
Teams to Playoffs

Team	Skip	W	L	W–L	PF	PA	EW	EL	BE	SE	LSD
(Ontario) Carleton Ravens	Owen Nicholls	6	1	–	44	19	23	17	3	8	22.64
(Alberta) Calgary Dinos	Kenan Wipf	5	2	–	48	33	22	23	2	5	66.14
(Newfoundland and Labrador) Memorial Sea-Hawks	Simon Perry	4	3	2–0	35	32	22	20	4	8	45.11
Alberta Golden Bears	Zach Davies	4	3	1–1	34	32	25	19	1	8	29.65
(Ontario) Wilfrid Laurier Golden Hawks	Kibo Mulima	4	3	0–2	41	29	26	22	2	10	33.08
(Ontario) York Lions	Ryan Mayville	2	5	1–0	23	48	17	25	4	4	54.38
(Nova Scotia) Dalhousie Tigers	Owen McPherson	2	5	0–1	29	44	23	26	1	2	32.26
(Saskatchewan) Regina Cougars	Carter Williamson	1	6	–	21	38	17	23	8	4	35.52

Round Robin Summary Table
Pos.	Team	(Alberta) UAB	(Alberta) CGY	(Ontario) CAR	(Nova Scotia) DAL	(Newfoundland and Labrador) MUN	(Saskatchewan) REG	(Ontario) WLU	(Ontario) YOR	Record
4	Alberta Golden Bears	—	6–11	4–6	8–4	4–5	3–1	4–1	5–4	4–3
2	(Alberta) Calgary Dinos	11–6	—	2–6	7–3	6–5	4–6	7–5	11–2	5–2
1	(Ontario) Carleton Ravens	6–4	6–2	—	6–4	8–0	7–3	3–6	8–0	6–1
7	(Nova Scotia) Dalhousie Tigers	4–8	3–7	4–6	—	5–4	6–5	4–8	3–6	2–5
3	(Newfoundland and Labrador) Memorial Sea-Hawks	5–4	5–6	0–8	4–5	—	5–1	6–5	10–3	4–3
8	(Saskatchewan) Regina Cougars	1–3	6–4	3–7	5–6	1–5	—	2–8	3–5	1–6
5	(Ontario) Wilfrid Laurier Golden Hawks	1–4	5–7	6–3	8–4	5–6	8–2	—	8–3	4–3
6	(Ontario) York Lions	4–5	2–11	0–8	6–3	3–10	5–3	3–8	—	2–5

=== Round robin results ===
All draws are listed in Central Time (UTC−06:00).

==== Draw 2 ====
Tuesday, February 17, 7:30 pm

Sheet G	1	2	3	4	5	6	7	8	Final
Alberta Golden Bears (Davies)	0	1	0	0	1	1	1	X	4
(Ontario) Wilfrid Laurier Golden Hawks (Mulima) 🔨	0	0	0	1	0	0	0	X	1

Sheet H	1	2	3	4	5	6	7	8	Final
(Ontario) Carleton Ravens (Nicholls)	0	2	3	0	1	0	1	X	7
(Saskatchewan) Regina Cougars (Williamson) 🔨	1	0	0	1	0	1	0	X	3

Tuesday, February 17, 8:00 pm

Sheet B	1	2	3	4	5	6	7	8	Final
(Ontario) York Lions (Mayville)	0	0	2	1	0	0	0	X	3
(Newfoundland and Labrador) Memorial Sea-Hawks (Perry) 🔨	0	3	0	0	1	1	5	X	10

Sheet D	1	2	3	4	5	6	7	8	Final
(Nova Scotia) Dalhousie Tigers (McPherson) 🔨	1	0	0	1	0	1	0	X	3
(Alberta) Calgary Dinos (Wipf)	0	0	2	0	1	0	4	X	7

==== Draw 4 ====
Wednesday, February 18, 12:30 pm

Sheet B	1	2	3	4	5	6	7	8	Final
(Alberta) Calgary Dinos (Wipf)	0	1	0	0	1	0	0	X	2
(Ontario) Carleton Ravens (Nicholls) 🔨	2	0	0	0	0	3	1	X	6

Sheet C	1	2	3	4	5	6	7	8	Final
(Ontario) Wilfrid Laurier Golden Hawks (Mulima) 🔨	0	3	0	0	2	0	1	2	8
(Ontario) York Lions (Mayville)	1	0	0	1	0	1	0	0	3

Wednesday, February 18, 1:00 pm

Sheet E	1	2	3	4	5	6	7	8	Final
(Newfoundland and Labrador) Memorial Sea-Hawks (Perry)	0	1	0	2	0	0	0	2	5
Alberta Golden Bears (Davies) 🔨	1	0	1	0	0	2	0	0	4

Sheet G	1	2	3	4	5	6	7	8	Final
(Saskatchewan) Regina Cougars (Williamson) 🔨	0	2	1	0	1	0	1	0	5
(Nova Scotia) Dalhousie Tigers (McPherson)	0	0	0	1	0	3	0	2	6

==== Draw 6 ====
Wednesday, February 18, 7:30 pm

Sheet A	1	2	3	4	5	6	7	8	Final
(Saskatchewan) Regina Cougars (Williamson)	0	1	1	0	0	0	X	X	2
(Ontario) Wilfrid Laurier Golden Hawks (Mulima) 🔨	1	0	0	2	2	3	X	X	8

Sheet C	1	2	3	4	5	6	7	8	Final
(Ontario) Carleton Ravens (Nicholls) 🔨	3	0	1	1	0	1	0	X	6
Alberta Golden Bears (Davies)	0	1	0	0	1	0	2	X	4

Wednesday, February 18, 8:00 pm

Sheet F	1	2	3	4	5	6	7	8	Final
(Alberta) Calgary Dinos (Wipf)	0	2	0	0	0	3	0	1	6
(Newfoundland and Labrador) Memorial Sea-Hawks (Perry) 🔨	1	0	0	1	1	0	2	0	5

Sheet H	1	2	3	4	5	6	7	8	Final
(Nova Scotia) Dalhousie Tigers (McPherson) 🔨	0	1	0	1	0	1	0	X	3
(Ontario) York Lions (Mayville)	0	0	2	0	2	0	2	X	6

==== Draw 8 ====
Thursday, February 19, 12:30 pm

Sheet A	1	2	3	4	5	6	7	8	Final
(Ontario) York Lions (Mayville)	0	0	0	0	0	0	X	X	0
(Ontario) Carleton Ravens (Nicholls) 🔨	0	5	0	0	1	2	X	X	8

Sheet D	1	2	3	4	5	6	7	8	Final
(Newfoundland and Labrador) Memorial Sea-Hawks (Perry) 🔨	3	0	0	1	1	0	X	X	5
(Saskatchewan) Regina Cougars (Williamson)	0	0	0	0	0	1	X	X	1

Thursday, February 19, 1:00 pm

Sheet E	1	2	3	4	5	6	7	8	Final
(Ontario) Wilfrid Laurier Golden Hawks (Mulima)	1	1	0	2	0	1	0	0	5
(Alberta) Calgary Dinos (Wipf) 🔨	0	0	2	0	2	0	2	1	7

Sheet F	1	2	3	4	5	6	7	8	Final
Alberta Golden Bears (Davies)	1	0	1	0	3	0	3	X	8
(Nova Scotia) Dalhousie Tigers (McPherson) 🔨	0	1	0	2	0	1	0	X	4

==== Draw 10 ====
Thursday, February 19, 7:30 pm

Sheet C	1	2	3	4	5	6	7	8	Final
(Alberta) Calgary Dinos (Wipf)	0	0	2	0	0	0	0	2	4
(Saskatchewan) Regina Cougars (Williamson) 🔨	2	0	0	0	2	1	1	0	6

Sheet D	1	2	3	4	5	6	7	8	Final
Alberta Golden Bears (Davies) 🔨	0	1	1	0	1	1	0	1	5
(Ontario) York Lions (Mayville)	1	0	0	1	0	0	2	0	4

Thursday, February 19, 8:00 pm

Sheet E	1	2	3	4	5	6	7	8	Final
(Ontario) Carleton Ravens (Nicholls)	0	2	0	0	1	1	0	2	6
(Nova Scotia) Dalhousie Tigers (McPherson) 🔨	1	0	1	1	0	0	1	0	4

Sheet H	1	2	3	4	5	6	7	8	9	Final
(Newfoundland and Labrador) Memorial Sea-Hawks (Perry)	0	0	0	0	3	1	1	0	1	6
(Ontario) Wilfrid Laurier Golden Hawks (Mulima) 🔨	1	1	0	1	0	0	0	2	0	5

==== Draw 11 ====
Friday, February 20, 9:00 am

Sheet A	1	2	3	4	5	6	7	8	Final
(Alberta) Calgary Dinos (Wipf)	0	2	4	0	2	0	3	X	11
Alberta Golden Bears (Davies) 🔨	1	0	0	2	0	3	0	X	6

Sheet B	1	2	3	4	5	6	7	8	Final
(Nova Scotia) Dalhousie Tigers (McPherson)	0	1	0	2	0	1	0	X	4
(Ontario) Wilfrid Laurier Golden Hawks (Mulima) 🔨	1	0	3	0	2	0	2	X	8

Friday, February 20, 9:30 am

Sheet F	1	2	3	4	5	6	7	8	Final
(Saskatchewan) Regina Cougars (Williamson)	0	0	0	0	1	0	2	0	3
(Ontario) York Lions (Mayville) 🔨	0	1	0	1	0	1	0	2	5

Sheet G	1	2	3	4	5	6	7	8	Final
(Ontario) Carleton Ravens (Nicholls) 🔨	5	2	1	X	X	X	X	X	8
(Newfoundland and Labrador) Memorial Sea-Hawks (Perry)	0	0	0	X	X	X	X	X	0

==== Draw 13 ====
Friday, February 20, 4:00 pm

Sheet A	1	2	3	4	5	6	7	8	Final
(Nova Scotia) Dalhousie Tigers (McPherson)	0	1	0	2	0	0	1	1	5
(Newfoundland and Labrador) Memorial Sea-Hawks (Perry) 🔨	1	0	1	0	1	1	0	0	4

Sheet B	1	2	3	4	5	6	7	8	Final
(Saskatchewan) Regina Cougars (Williamson) 🔨	0	0	0	0	1	0	0	X	1
Alberta Golden Bears (Davies)	0	1	0	0	0	1	1	X	3

Friday, February 20, 4:30 pm

Sheet F	1	2	3	4	5	6	7	8	Final
(Ontario) Wilfrid Laurier Golden Hawks (Mulima)	1	0	1	1	0	1	2	X	6
(Ontario) Carleton Ravens (Nicholls) 🔨	0	2	0	0	1	0	0	X	3

Sheet G	1	2	3	4	5	6	7	8	Final
(Ontario) York Lions (Mayville) 🔨	0	1	0	0	1	0	X	X	2
(Alberta) Calgary Dinos (Wipf)	2	0	2	2	0	5	X	X	11

=== Playoffs ===
Semifinal
1	(Ontario) Carleton Ravens	6
4	Alberta Golden Bears	4
2	(Alberta) Calgary Dinos	8
3	(Newfoundland and Labrador) Memorial Sea-Hawks	6

Final
1	(Ontario) Carleton Ravens	6
2	(Alberta) Calgary Dinos	7
Bronze medal game
4	Alberta Golden Bears	6
3	(Newfoundland and Labrador) Memorial Sea-Hawks	3

==== Semifinals ====
Saturday, February 21, 9:00 am

Sheet E	1	2	3	4	5	6	7	8	Final
(Ontario) Carleton Ravens (Nicholls) 🔨	2	0	0	2	0	2	0	X	6
Alberta Golden Bears (Davies)	0	1	1	0	1	0	1	X	4

Sheet F	1	2	3	4	5	6	7	8	Final
(Alberta) Calgary Dinos (Wipf) 🔨	3	0	0	2	0	1	0	2	8
(Newfoundland and Labrador) Memorial Sea-Hawks (Perry)	0	1	1	0	3	0	1	0	6

==== Bronze medal game ====
Saturday, February 21, 1:00 pm

Sheet H	1	2	3	4	5	6	7	8	Final
Alberta Golden Bears (Davies)	0	1	0	2	0	0	1	2	6
(Newfoundland and Labrador) Memorial Sea-Hawks (Perry) 🔨	1	0	1	0	1	0	0	0	3

==== Final ====
Saturday, February 21, 1:00 pm

Sheet G	1	2	3	4	5	6	7	8	9	Final
(Ontario) Carleton Ravens (Nicholls) 🔨	1	0	0	3	0	1	0	1	0	6
(Alberta) Calgary Dinos (Wipf)	0	0	3	0	2	0	1	0	1	7

=== Final standings ===
Place	Team
1st place, gold medalist(s)	(Alberta) Calgary Dinos
2nd place, silver medalist(s)	(Ontario) Carleton Ravens
3rd place, bronze medalist(s)	Alberta Golden Bears
4	(Newfoundland and Labrador) Memorial Sea-Hawks
5	(Ontario) Wilfrid Laurier Golden Hawks
6	(Ontario) York Lions
7	(Nova Scotia) Dalhousie Tigers
8	(Saskatchewan) Regina Cougars

== Women ==
=== Qualification ===
The following universities qualified to participate in the 2026 U Sports/Curling Canada University Curling Championships:

Region	Vacancies	Qualified
Host	1	(Saskatchewan) Regina Cougars
Canada West Universities Athletic Association	2	Alberta Pandas; Calgary Dinos
Ontario University Athletics	3	(Ontario) Guelph Gryphons (Ontario) McMaster Marauders (Ontario) Queen's Golden Gaels
Atlantic University Sport	2	(Newfoundland and Labrador) Memorial Sea-Hawks (New Brunswick) UNB Reds
TOTAL	8	

=== Teams ===
The teams are listed as follows:

Team	Skip	Third	Second	Lead	Alternate	University
Alberta Pandas	Gracelyn Richards	Emma Yarmuch	Rachel Jacques	Sophia Ryhorchuk	Emma DeSchiffart	University of Alberta
Calgary Dinos	Ava Koe	Elizabeth Morgan	Carley Hardie	Kate Ector		(Alberta) University of Calgary
Guelph Gryphons	Katrina Frlan	Erika Wainwright	Aila Thompson	Kelsea Marcolini	Liana Flanagan	(Ontario) University of Guelph
McMaster Marauders	Evelyn Robert (Fourth)	Clara Dissanayake	Maggie Fitzgerald (Skip)	Ella Wang		(Ontario) McMaster University
Memorial Sea-Hawks	Cailey Locke	Hayley Gushue	Emily Neary	Sitaye Penney		(Newfoundland and Labrador) Memorial University of Newfoundland
Queen's Golden Gaels	Ava Acres	Mia Toner	Riley Puhl	Sadie McCutcheon		(Ontario) Queen's University at Kingston
Regina Cougars	Chloe Johnston	Tesa Silversides	Hannah Rugg	Lauren Speidel	Makena Bailey	(Saskatchewan) University of Regina
UNB Reds	Jenna Campbell	Rebecca Watson	Carly Smith	Hannah Williams	Karlyn Jacobson	University of New Brunswick

=== Round robin standings ===
Final Round Robin Standings

Key
Teams to Playoffs

Team	Skip	W	L	W–L	PF	PA	EW	EL	BE	SE	LSD
(Newfoundland and Labrador) Memorial Sea-Hawks	Cailey Locke	5	2	1–0	49	35	28	25	4	11	38.13
Alberta Pandas	Gracelyn Richards	5	2	0–1	45	34	26	22	0	6	69.84
(Ontario) McMaster Marauders	Maggie Fitzgerald	4	3	1–0	46	39	25	26	2	6	46.19
(Saskatchewan) Regina Cougars	Chloe Johnston	4	3	0–1	45	38	27	20	1	10	58.34
(Ontario) Queen's Golden Gaels	Ava Acres	3	4	2–0	35	46	24	23	3	6	55.80
(Ontario) Guelph Gryphons	Katrina Frlan	3	4	1–1	39	39	23	24	3	6	48.57
(New Brunswick) UNB Reds	Jenna Campbell	3	4	0–2	39	40	22	27	3	7	50.82
(Alberta) Calgary Dinos	Ava Koe	1	6	–	29	56	19	27	2	5	46.68

Round Robin Summary Table
Pos.	Team	(Alberta) UAB	(Alberta) CGY	(Ontario) GUE	(Ontario) MAC	(Newfoundland and Labrador) MUN	(Ontario) QNS	(Saskatchewan) REG	(New Brunswick) UNB	Record
2	Alberta Pandas	—	8–5	9–4	6–5	3–5	8–2	8–5	3–8	5–2
8	(Alberta) Calgary Dinos	5–8	—	3–7	6–7	4–11	9–5	1–10	1–8	1–6
6	(Ontario) Guelph Gryphons	4–9	7–3	—	6–7	5–9	2–4	10–3	5–4	3–4
3	(Ontario) McMaster Marauders	5–6	7–6	7–6	—	4–5	12–5	6–5	5–6	4–3
1	(Newfoundland and Labrador) Memorial Sea-Hawks	5–3	11–4	9–5	5–4	—	4–5	6–7	9–7	5–2
5	(Ontario) Queen's Golden Gaels	2–8	5–9	4–2	5–12	5–4	—	4–8	10–3	3–4
4	(Saskatchewan) Regina Cougars	5–8	10–1	3–10	5–6	7–6	8–4	—	7–3	4–3
7	(New Brunswick) UNB Reds	8–3	8–1	4–5	6–5	7–9	3–10	3–7	—	3–4

=== Round robin results ===
All draws are listed in Central Time (UTC−06:00).

==== Draw 2 ====
Tuesday, February 17, 7:30 pm

Sheet E	1	2	3	4	5	6	7	8	Final
Alberta Pandas (Richards)	0	0	1	0	0	0	2	0	3
(Newfoundland and Labrador) Memorial Sea-Hawks (Locke) 🔨	1	1	0	0	0	1	0	2	5

Sheet F	1	2	3	4	5	6	7	8	Final
(Ontario) Guelph Gryphons (Frlan) 🔨	3	0	0	5	2	0	X	X	10
(Saskatchewan) Regina Cougars (Johnston)	0	1	0	0	0	2	X	X	3

Tuesday, February 17, 8:00 pm

Sheet A	1	2	3	4	5	6	7	8	Final
(New Brunswick) UNB Reds (Campbell)	0	1	0	0	0	2	0	X	3
(Ontario) Queen's Golden Gaels (Acres) 🔨	2	0	4	1	1	0	2	X	10

Sheet C	1	2	3	4	5	6	7	8	9	Final
(Alberta) Calgary Dinos (Koe) 🔨	0	1	1	0	0	2	0	2	0	6
(Ontario) McMaster Marauders (Fitzgerald)	0	0	0	3	2	0	1	0	1	7

==== Draw 4 ====
Wednesday, February 18, 12:30 pm

Sheet A	1	2	3	4	5	6	7	8	Final
(Alberta) Calgary Dinos (Koe) 🔨	1	0	2	0	0	0	2	0	5
Alberta Pandas (Richards)	0	3	0	2	0	1	0	2	8

Sheet D	1	2	3	4	5	6	7	8	Final
(Saskatchewan) Regina Cougars (Johnston)	1	1	0	2	0	3	0	1	8
(Ontario) Queen's Golden Gaels (Acres) 🔨	0	0	1	0	1	0	2	0	4

Wednesday, February 18, 1:00 pm

Sheet F	1	2	3	4	5	6	7	8	9	Final
(Ontario) McMaster Marauders (Fitzgerald) 🔨	1	0	0	0	1	1	1	0	0	4
(Newfoundland and Labrador) Memorial Sea-Hawks (Locke)	0	0	2	1	0	0	0	1	1	5

Sheet H	1	2	3	4	5	6	7	8	9	Final
(Ontario) Guelph Gryphons (Frlan) 🔨	0	0	1	0	0	0	3	0	1	5
(New Brunswick) UNB Reds (Campbell)	0	1	0	1	0	1	0	1	0	4

==== Draw 6 ====
Wednesday, February 18, 7:30 pm

Sheet B	1	2	3	4	5	6	7	8	Final
(Ontario) Queen's Golden Gaels (Acres)	0	1	0	1	0	X	X	X	2
Alberta Pandas (Richards) 🔨	3	0	2	0	3	X	X	X	8

Sheet D	1	2	3	4	5	6	7	8	Final
(Newfoundland and Labrador) Memorial Sea-Hawks (Locke) 🔨	2	1	0	3	1	0	1	1	9
(New Brunswick) UNB Reds (Campbell)	0	0	3	0	0	4	0	0	7

Wednesday, February 18, 8:00 pm

Sheet E	1	2	3	4	5	6	7	8	Final
(Saskatchewan) Regina Cougars (Johnston) 🔨	0	0	1	5	4	X	X	X	10
(Alberta) Calgary Dinos (Koe)	1	0	0	0	0	X	X	X	1

Sheet G	1	2	3	4	5	6	7	8	Final
(Ontario) McMaster Marauders (Fitzgerald) 🔨	0	3	0	3	0	1	0	0	7
(Ontario) Guelph Gryphons (Frlan)	0	0	2	0	2	0	1	1	6

==== Draw 8 ====
Thursday, February 19, 12:30 pm

Sheet B	1	2	3	4	5	6	7	8	Final
(New Brunswick) UNB Reds (Campbell) 🔨	1	0	1	1	3	2	X	X	8
(Alberta) Calgary Dinos (Koe)	0	1	0	0	0	0	X	X	1

Sheet C	1	2	3	4	5	6	7	8	Final
Alberta Pandas (Richards) 🔨	2	0	0	3	1	0	1	2	9
(Ontario) Guelph Gryphons (Frlan)	0	2	1	0	0	1	0	0	4

Thursday, February 19, 1:00 pm

Sheet G	1	2	3	4	5	6	7	8	Final
(Newfoundland and Labrador) Memorial Sea-Hawks (Locke) 🔨	1	0	0	0	0	3	2	0	6
(Saskatchewan) Regina Cougars (Johnston)	0	1	1	2	1	0	0	2	7

Sheet H	1	2	3	4	5	6	7	8	Final
(Ontario) Queen's Golden Gaels (Acres)	0	2	0	1	0	2	0	X	5
(Ontario) McMaster Marauders (Fitzgerald) 🔨	1	0	4	0	3	0	4	X	12

==== Draw 10 ====
Thursday, February 19, 7:30 pm

Sheet A	1	2	3	4	5	6	7	8	Final
(Ontario) Guelph Gryphons (Frlan) 🔨	0	1	0	1	1	0	2	0	5
(Newfoundland and Labrador) Memorial Sea-Hawks (Locke)	2	0	1	0	0	2	0	4	9

Sheet B	1	2	3	4	5	6	7	8	Final
(Saskatchewan) Regina Cougars (Johnston)	0	2	0	0	1	0	0	2	5
(Ontario) McMaster Marauders (Fitzgerald) 🔨	1	0	2	1	0	0	2	0	6

Thursday, February 19, 8:00 pm

Sheet F	1	2	3	4	5	6	7	8	Final
(Alberta) Calgary Dinos (Koe) 🔨	0	3	0	1	2	0	3	X	9
(Ontario) Queen's Golden Gaels (Acres)	1	0	1	0	0	3	0	X	5

Sheet G	1	2	3	4	5	6	7	8	Final
Alberta Pandas (Richards)	1	0	0	1	0	1	0	X	3
(New Brunswick) UNB Reds (Campbell) 🔨	0	3	1	0	1	0	3	X	8

==== Draw 11 ====
Friday, February 20, 9:00 am

Sheet C	1	2	3	4	5	6	7	8	9	Final
(Ontario) Queen's Golden Gaels (Acres) 🔨	1	1	1	0	0	0	1	0	1	5
(Newfoundland and Labrador) Memorial Sea-Hawks (Locke)	0	0	0	0	1	1	0	2	0	4

Sheet D	1	2	3	4	5	6	7	8	Final
(Alberta) Calgary Dinos (Koe)	0	0	1	1	0	0	1	X	3
(Ontario) Guelph Gryphons (Frlan) 🔨	1	1	0	0	2	3	0	X	7

Friday, February 20, 9:30 am

Sheet E	1	2	3	4	5	6	7	8	9	Final
(Ontario) McMaster Marauders (Fitzgerald)	0	0	0	1	0	1	3	0	0	5
(New Brunswick) UNB Reds (Campbell) 🔨	0	0	0	0	3	0	0	2	1	6

Sheet H	1	2	3	4	5	6	7	8	Final
(Saskatchewan) Regina Cougars (Johnston)	0	3	0	1	0	1	0	X	5
Alberta Pandas (Richards) 🔨	3	0	3	0	1	0	1	X	8

==== Draw 13 ====
Friday, February 20, 4:00 pm

Sheet C	1	2	3	4	5	6	7	8	Final
(New Brunswick) UNB Reds (Campbell)	0	2	0	1	0	0	0	0	3
(Saskatchewan) Regina Cougars (Johnston) 🔨	1	0	1	0	1	1	1	2	7

Sheet D	1	2	3	4	5	6	7	8	Final
(Ontario) McMaster Marauders (Fitzgerald) 🔨	0	1	0	2	0	2	0	0	5
Alberta Pandas (Richards)	1	0	1	0	1	0	2	1	6

Friday, February 20, 4:30 pm

Sheet E	1	2	3	4	5	6	7	8	Final
(Ontario) Queen's Golden Gaels (Acres)	0	0	0	0	1	0	1	2	4
(Ontario) Guelph Gryphons (Frlan) 🔨	1	0	0	0	0	1	0	0	2

Sheet H	1	2	3	4	5	6	7	8	Final
(Newfoundland and Labrador) Memorial Sea-Hawks (Locke)	2	0	2	0	0	3	4	X	11
(Alberta) Calgary Dinos (Koe) 🔨	0	2	0	1	1	0	0	X	4

=== Playoffs ===
Semifinal
1	(Newfoundland and Labrador) Memorial Sea-Hawks	5
4	(Saskatchewan) Regina Cougars	2
2	Alberta Pandas	2
3	(Ontario) McMaster Marauders	3

Final
1	(Newfoundland and Labrador) Memorial Sea-Hawks	5
3	(Ontario) McMaster Marauders	4
Bronze medal game
4	(Saskatchewan) Regina Cougars	2
2	Alberta Pandas	8

==== Semifinals ====
Saturday, February 21, 9:00 am

Sheet G	1	2	3	4	5	6	7	8	Final
Alberta Pandas (Richards) 🔨	0	0	1	0	0	0	1	0	2
(Ontario) McMaster Marauders (Fitzgerald)	0	0	0	1	0	0	0	2	3

Sheet H	1	2	3	4	5	6	7	8	Final
(Newfoundland and Labrador) Memorial Sea-Hawks (Locke) 🔨	1	1	1	0	1	0	0	1	5
(Saskatchewan) Regina Cougars (Johnston)	0	0	0	1	0	1	0	0	2

==== Bronze medal game ====
Saturday, February 21, 1:00 pm

Sheet F	1	2	3	4	5	6	7	8	Final
(Saskatchewan) Regina Cougars (Johnston)	0	0	1	0	1	0	X	X	2
Alberta Pandas (Richards) 🔨	2	0	0	4	0	2	X	X	8

==== Final ====
Saturday, February 21, 1:00 pm

Sheet E	1	2	3	4	5	6	7	8	Final
(Newfoundland and Labrador) Memorial Sea-Hawks (Locke) 🔨	0	2	0	0	1	0	1	1	5
(Ontario) McMaster Marauders (Fitzgerald)	0	0	1	2	0	1	0	0	4

=== Final standings ===
Place	Team
1st place, gold medalist(s)	(Newfoundland and Labrador) Memorial Sea-Hawks
2nd place, silver medalist(s)	(Ontario) McMaster Marauders
3rd place, bronze medalist(s)	Alberta Pandas
4	(Saskatchewan) Regina Cougars
5	(Ontario) Queen's Golden Gaels
6	(Ontario) Guelph Gryphons
7	(New Brunswick) UNB Reds
8	(Alberta) Calgary Dinos
