= Cégep de l'Abitibi-Témiscamingue =

Public college in Rouyn-Noranda, Quebec

Coordinates: 48°13′39.51″N 79°0′28.94″W

- Motto: Artisan d'avenir
- Motto in English: Craftsman of the future
- Type: Public CEGEP
- Established: 1967
- Academic affiliations: ACCC
- Students: 2755: 225 (Amos campus); 2000 (Rouyn-Noranda campus); 530 (Val-d'Or campus)
- Location: 425, boulevard du Collège C.P. 1500 Rouyn-Noranda, Quebec, Canada
- Campus: 3 Urban/Suburban, campuses in Rouyn-Noranda, Amos and Val-d'Or, Ville-Marie and La Sarre
- Colours: White & blue
- Nicknames: Gaillards & Astrelles
- Sporting affiliations: CCAA, QSSF
- Website: www.cegepat.qc.ca

Cégep de l'Abitibi-Témiscamingue is a public college-level institute of education (CEGEP) with its main campus located in Rouyn-Noranda, Quebec, Canada. The CEGEP has two additional campuses, in Amos and Val-d'Or. It was founded in 1967, and 2,500 students are currently enrolled. Programs are offered in mining and forestry, as well as social, technical, industrial, and communications professions.

== History ==
The college traces its origins to the merger of several institutions which became public ones in 1967, when the Quebec system of CEGEPs was created.

== Programs ==
The college offers pre-university and technical programs, continuing education and services to business. The pre-university programs are two years in length, allowing the student to enter university. Technical programs are three years in length, where the student can enter the workforce once completed or continue their studies at the university level. Students are awarded a Diploma of College Studies, or Diplôme d'études collégiales.

=== Pre-university programs ===
- Arts, Literature and Communication
  - Cinema option
  - Literature option
  - Language option
- Visual Arts
- Music
- Social Science
  - General profile
  - Mathematic profile
- Health Science

=== Technical programs ===
- Industrial Maintenance Mechanics
- Civil Engineering Technology
- Electrical Engineering Technology: Automation and Controls
- Forest Technology
- Mineral Technology:
  - Geology
  - Mining
  - Mineral Processing
- Early Childhood Education
- Special Care Counselling
- Social Service
- Youth and Adult Correctional Intervention
- Accounting and Management Technology
- Computer Science Technology
- Nursing
- Pre-Hospital Emergency Care
- Pharmacy Technology
- Police Technology

== Campus ==
- The Campus d'Amos is located at 341 Principale Street North, Amos, Quebec. Founded in 1983, the campus serves 200 students, with a combination of pre-university and technical programs, continuing education and programs for businesses, business, management, agricultural science, humanities.
- The Campus de Rouyn-Noranda (siège social) is located at 425 Boulevard du Collège Rouyn-Noranda, Quebec. Founded in 1967 as Cégep de Rouyn, the Cégep de l'Abitibi-Témiscamingue currently has 1800 students. The programs offered include pre-university and technical studies, nursing, forestry engineering technology, arts, and technology of industrial maintenance, electronics, mineral technology, early childhood education, special education, social work, management, accounting, computer technology and police techniques.
- The Campus de Val-d'Or is located at 675 1^{re} Avenue Est, Val-d'Or, Quebec. Founded in 1988, the Campus in Val-d'Oris is housed in Centre d'études supérieures Lucien-Cliche, on the campus of the Université du Québec en Abitibi-Témiscamingue. There are 500 students.

== See also ==
- List of colleges in Quebec
- Higher education in Quebec
