= 2009 CCAA Soccer Championship =

2009 CCAA Men's Soccer Championship
The Big Kahuna
- November 4–7, 2009

Tournament details
- Country: Canada
- Teams: 6

Final positions
- Champions: Seneca Sting
- Runners-up: F.X. Garneau Élans

Tournament statistics
- Matches played: 9
- Goals scored: 30 (3.33 per match)

The 2009 CCAA Men's Soccer Championship was an association football team contested in Canada. It was organized by CCAA and sponsored by Adidas.

== Participants ==
- Seneca Sting
- Holland Hurricanes
- Mount Royal Cougars
- Douglas Royals
- F.X. Garneau Élans
- Algonquin Thunder

== Group stage ==
=== Group A ===
| Team | Wins | Losses | Goals for | Goals against | Goal difference |
|---|---|---|---|---|---|
| Seneca Sting | 2 | 0 | 5 | 0 | 5 |
| Douglas Royals | 1 | 1 | 6 | 1 | 5 |
| Holland Hurricanes | 0 | 2 | 0 | 10 | –10 |

=== Group B ===
| Team | Wins | Losses | Goals for | Goals against | Goal difference |
|---|---|---|---|---|---|
| F.X. Garneau Élans | 2 | 0 | 3 | 1 | 2 |
| Mount Royal Cougars | 1 | 1 | 3 | 3 | 0 |
| Algonquin Thunder | 0 | 2 | 3 | 5 | –2 |

== Matches ==
4 November
11:30 am

| Algonquin Thunder | 1–2 | F.X. Garneau Élans |

4 November
2:00 pm

| Douglas Royals | 0–1 | Seneca Sting |

5 November
11:30 am

| F.X. Garneau Élans | 1–0 | Mount Royal Cougars |

5 November
2:00 pm

| Seneca Sting | 4–0 | Holland Hurricanes |

6 November
11:30 am

| Douglas Royals | 6–0 | Holland Hurricanes |

6 November
2:00 pm

| Algonquin Thunder | 2–3 | Mount Royal Cougars |

== 5th/6th place playoff ==
7 November
9:00 am

| Algonquin Thunder | 3–1 | Holland Hurricanes |

== 3rd/4th place playoff ==
7 November
12:00 pm

| Douglas Royals | 1–0 | Mount Royal Cougars |

== Final ==
7 November
3:00 pm

| Seneca Sting | 3–2 | F.X. Garneau Élans |
