= Pacific Western Athletic Association =

Canadian college athletics conference

- Conference: CCAA
- Founded: 1970
- Headquarters: British Columbia
- Official website: www.pacwestbc.ca

The Pacific Western Athletic Association (PACWEST) is a Canadian college athletic conference affiliated in the Canadian Collegiate Athletic Association (CCAA).

It was founded in 1970 as the Totem Conference. The president of the PACWEST in October 2025 is Danielle Foote.

== Member schools ==
=== Current members ===
Institution	Location (primary) (Note: All cities are located in the Province of British Columbia.)	Founded	Affiliation	Enrollment (fall 2023)	Endowment (millions – FY24)	Nickname	Joined	Colors
Camosun College	Victoria	1971	Public	15,540		Chargers	1994	
Capilano University	North Vancouver	1968	Public			Blues		
College of the Rockies	Cranbrook		Public			Avalanche		
Columbia Bible College	Abbotsford		Mennonite			Bearcats		
Douglas College	New Westminster		Public			Royals		
Langara College	Vancouver		Public			Falcons		
Okanagan College	Kelowna		Public			Coyotes		
Vancouver Island University	Nanaimo		Public			Mariners		

=== Former members ===
Institution	Location (primary)	Founded	Affiliation	Nickname	Joined	Left	Colors	Current conference
Kwantlen Polytechnic University	Surrey, British Columbia	1981	Public	Eagles		2016		N/A (athletics program dissolved)

== See also ==
- Canadian Collegiate Athletic Association
