= Concordia University of Edmonton =

Canadian independent public university

- Former names: Concordia College (1921–1995); Concordia University College of Alberta (1995–2015)
- Motto: Initium Sapientiae Timor Domini
- Motto in English: The fear of the Lord is the beginning of wisdom
- Type: Public Independent
- Established: 1921
- Affiliations: AUCC, ACAA
- Chancellor: Al Huehn
- President: Tim Loreman
- Students: 2,146 (2023-24 fulltime equivalent)
- Undergraduates: 1,822
- Postgraduates: 289
- Location: Edmonton, Alberta, Canada; 53.559°N 113.444°W
- Campus: Urban Residential
- Colours: blue and gold
- Nickname: Thunder
- Mascot: Boomer (the Mammoth)
- Website: http://concordia.ab.ca

Concordia University of Edmonton, is a publicly funded independent academic institution in Edmonton, Alberta, Canada; accredited under the Alberta Post-secondary Learning Act. Concordia offers arts, science, and management undergraduate degree programs, as well as graduate degree programs in education, information technology, information security, and psychology. Concordia is primarily funded by tuition and fees, and as of 2025, receives nearly one third of its funding from the government of Alberta.

== History ==
Concordia University of Edmonton was founded in 1921 as Concordia College by the Lutheran Church – Missouri Synod to prepare young men for preaching and teaching in the Christian church. It was essentially a high school for many decades. It introduced co-education in 1939, offering general study courses and an accredited high school program. In 1967, Concordia began offering first-year university courses in affiliation with the University of Alberta. Affiliation for second-year courses began in 1975. The university graduated its first cohort of Bachelor of Arts and Bachelor of Science three-year degrees in 1988, gradually expanding to other disciplines and four-year programs. A formal separation between the high school and college (degree granting) was initiated in 1994.

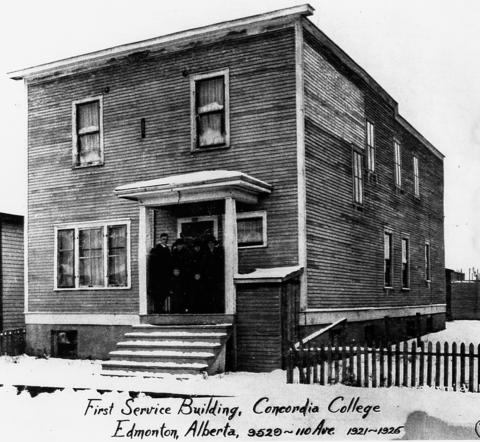
First Service Building, Concordia College, 1921, Edmonton, Alberta

The affiliation with the University of Alberta officially ended in 1991 by mutual agreement. Concordia College operated as a denominational college affiliated with the public sector until 1987, when the province of Alberta allowed Concordia to start operating as a private degree-granting university college. Concordia changed its name from Concordia College to Concordia University College of Alberta (CUCA) in 1995. The high school program that had run within Concordia since 1939 separated into an independent institution called Concordia High School in 2000. Both institutions shared the same campus until July 2011. In 2014, the Alberta government announced that Concordia would be allowed to drop the word "college" from its name, allowing Concordia to call itself a university. On May 1, 2015, Concordia University College of Alberta was renamed Concordia University of Edmonton (CUE).

Although the university had indicated its intention to continue relationships with Lutheran organizations and alumni, in November 2015 Concordia removed references to Christianity from its mission statement, effectively self-identifying as a secular institution. Concordia's religious constituency had not fully funded the school since 1978, and in 2015, with religious financial support at 0.1 per cent of the school's $30 million budget, the board decided to secularize. The secularization was formally announced in April 2016.

On January 4, 2022, the Concordia University of Edmonton Faculty Association (CUEFA) began a strike over concerns surrounding pay and workload. This was the first strike by an Albertan faculty association since they had gained the right to do so under the Labour Relations Code in 2017. The strike lasted for 11 days, with CUEFA and the university reaching a four-year collective agreement on January 15. As a result of the strike, the start of the 2022 winter semester was delayed until January 19.

On June 2, 2024, the union representing Concordia's faculty stated it did not have confidence in either school president Tim Loreman or board chair John Acheson, citing a dysfunctional workplace, ongoing leadership problems, and an excessive use of disciplinary measures against faculty members. Faculty members also expressed concerns about a lack of transparency from administration, recent staff restructuring, the financing of new buildings, and a fear of retribution if they speak out. The school's board of governors replied that it had full confidence in the president.

The university also recently faced criticism for the use of its public funding dollars in the $1.75 million purchase of the historic Magrath Mansion in 2021.

== Programs and faculties ==
The university has five faculties and two schools: Faculty of Arts, Faculty of Education, Faculty of Graduate Studies, Faculty of Science, Faculty of Management/Mihalcheon School of Management, and the School of Physical Education and Wellness. The School of Music was closed in 2021. The university offers 45 majors and minors in the fields of arts, science, and management; two after-degree programs, three master's degrees, and several graduate certificates and diplomas. CUE also offers a Doctor of Psychology (PsyD) in Clinical Psychology, which is the only program of its kind west of Manitoba.

Olds College of Agriculture & Technology has partnered with CUE to enable a cohort of its Business Management Diploma students to take classes in Edmonton from CUE's campus. The University of Lethbridge had a small extension campus at the university from 2012 to 2015.

Campus life features a community orchestra, a choir, and regular drama productions. There are three dormitory buildings on campus: Founders Hall, Eberhardt Hall, and Wangerin House. In 2025, as the university began construction of a new 200-bed student residence, which is set to welcome students in 2027.

The university has a gymnasium and a large athletic field on campus. In the past the field was sometimes used for spring practice by the Edmonton Elks football team.

Virginia Park School, Bright Horizons Childcare/Luminary residential tower and the Concordia Lutheran Seminary are often perceived as being part of the university grounds; however, they are situated on separate properties directly adjacent to the campus.

== Crest and logo ==
Concordia's crest was designed in 1921 and was in continual use as a logo until 1991, when it was updated to remove the word "college" from the title. In 2010 the crest was retired as the visual identity of Concordia. It remains in use on legal documents as a seal, and on degree diplomas.

"Door" logo in use from 2010 to 2025

A new "door" logo was adopted in 2010. It reflects Concordia's front entrance of the historic Schwermann Hall, completed in 1925 and inaugurated in 1926, which also mirrors the Castle Church door in Wittenberg, Germany, on which Martin Luther nailed the 95 Theses, sparking the Reformation. Further, the logo's curved lines represents the shore and waters of the North Saskatchewan River, which lies directly below Concordia in the Highlands neighborhood of Edmonton.

In 2024, the university rolled out a new logo featuring the CUE wordmark, and began transitioning its visual identity away from the "door" logo.

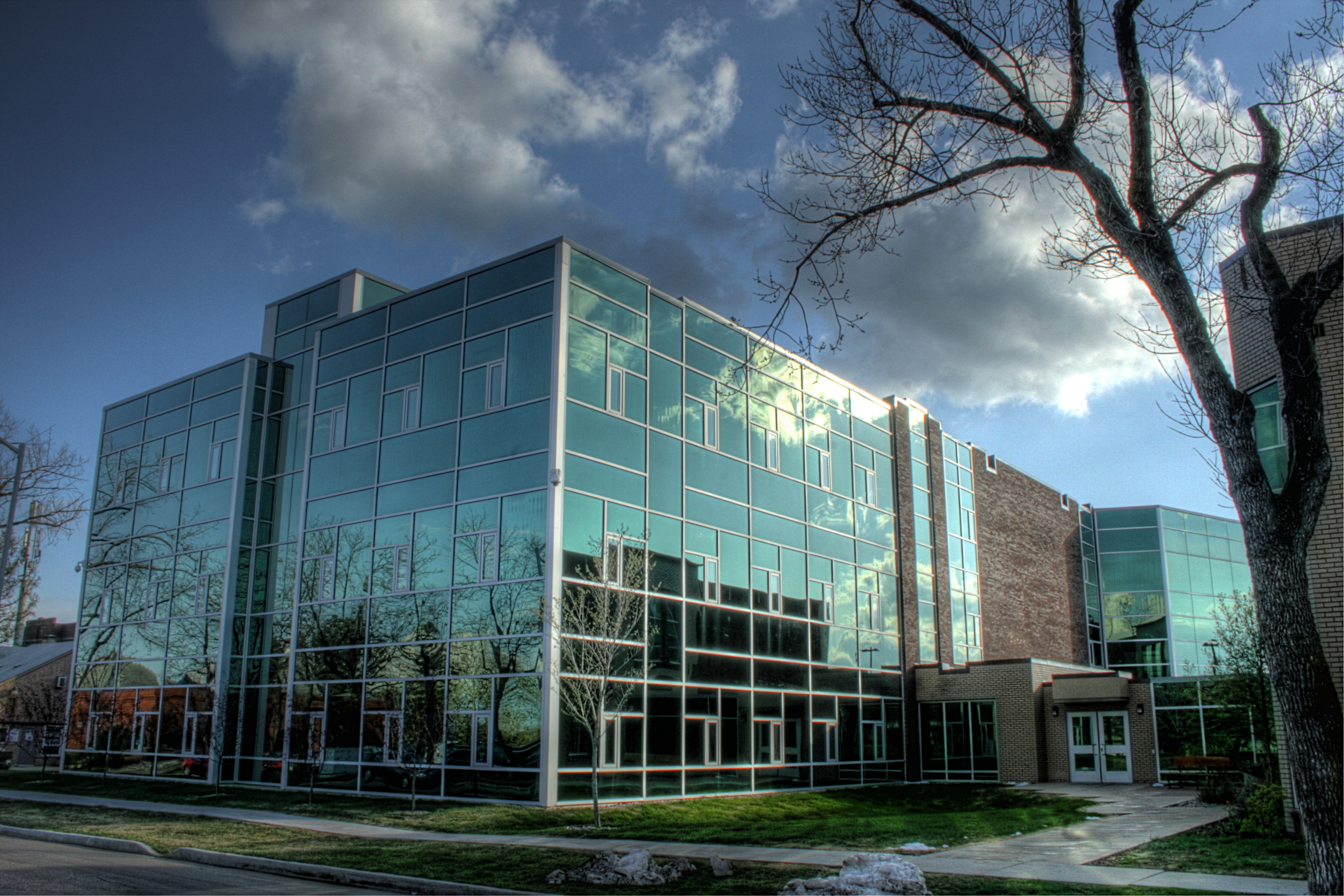
Hole Academic Centre

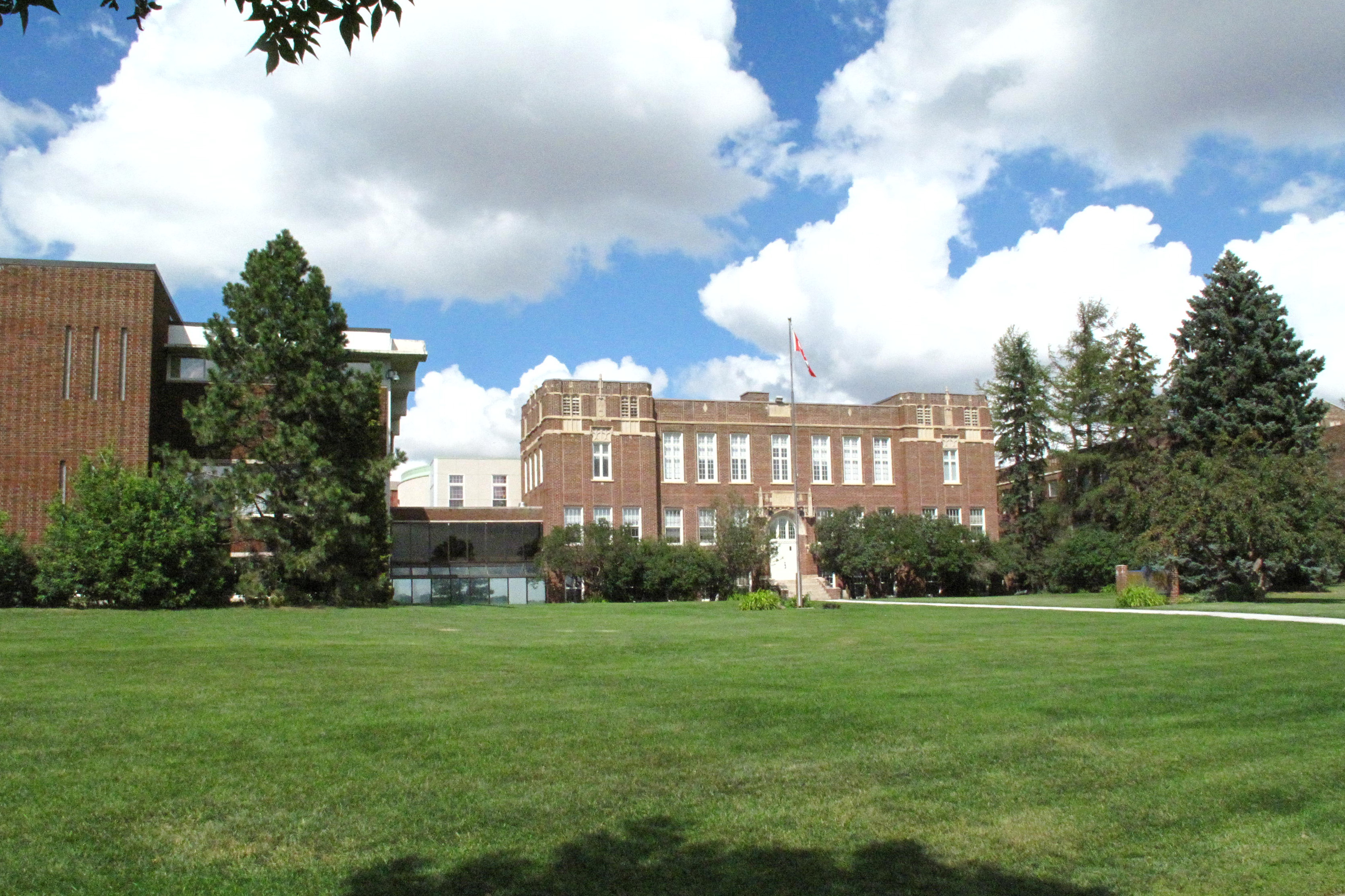
Concordia campus from Ada Boulevard

== Notable alumni ==
- Lynne Bowen, university professor, oral historian and writer—CUE Distinguished Alumni Award 2000 winner
- Nathan Fillion, actor
- Sarah Hoffman, politician
- Sam Lam, soccer player

== Athletics ==
The Concordia Thunder compete in the Alberta Colleges Athletic Conference (Provincial Level) and the Canadian Colleges Athletic Association (National Level). Team sports include: badminton, basketball, curling, golf, hockey, soccer, cross country running, and volleyball. Each sport includes participation by both men and women on separate teams with the exception of hockey, which only has a men's team. Thunder alumni include: Andrew Parker, a basketball player who competes for the Edmonton Energy of the International Basketball League.
