= Red Deer Polytechnic =

Polytechnic institute in Red Deer, Alberta

- Red Deer College coat of arms originally designed by Darren George
- Former name: Red Deer College
- Motto: Latin: Ad Augusta Per Eruditionem
- Motto in English: To Greater Things Through Learning
- Type: Public polytechnic institute
- Established: 1964
- Affiliations: CICan, CCAA, AACTI, CBIE, ACAC
- President: Stuart Cullum
- Students: 4,497 (2023-24 fulltime equivalent)
- Location: Red Deer, Alberta, Canada; 52°14′47″N 113°49′39″W
- Campus: Urban
- Colours: Lime green, black, silver
- Nicknames: Kings and Queens
- Mascot: Rufus the Lion
- Website: rdpolytech.ca

Red Deer Polytechnic (RDP), formerly Red Deer College, is a public polytechnic institute of approximately 10,000 students in credit, non-credit and apprenticeship programming located in Red Deer, Alberta, Canada. In 2021, Red Deer College was converted into a provincially focused polytechnic institute called Red Deer Polytechnic, with the added ability to grant bachelor's degrees.

== History ==
Established in 1964 as Red Deer College, (RDC), the institution was built for a smaller semi-rural community but, in the years since its founding, the city has grown into the third largest in the province.

Red Deer College's arms, supporters and flag (all designed by Darren George) were registered with the Canadian Heraldic Authority on February 20, 2004. The college is a member of the Alberta Rural Development Network.

In 2018, Red Deer College applied to begin transitioning to a university. The goal was to become a central hub of research and education for Central Alberta, offering education in the trades, the sciences, and the arts and fine arts. On March 5, 2019, the college announced a three-year transition process, and that it would adopt the name Red Deer University.

However on May 5, 2021, the Government of Alberta announced that Red Deer College would become a polytechnic institution instead of a university. The transition and name change was complete by June 2021.

== Programs ==
Red Deer Polytechnic offers certificates, diplomas, advanced certificates, applied degrees, bachelor's degrees, academic upgrading and apprenticeship in over 75 different career and academic programs, including the creative and liberal arts, engineering, and trades.

== Scholarships and bursaries ==
The Government of Canada sponsors an Aboriginal Bursaries Search Tool that lists over 680 scholarships, bursaries, and other incentives offered by governments, universities, and industry to support Aboriginal post-secondary participation. RDP provides the Atoskewan Aboriginal Career Centre Scholarship for Aboriginal, First Nations and Métis students.

RDP awards over $1,100,000 (CAD) annually in scholarships and bursaries.

== Undergraduate student conference ==
The Agora Student Conference is held annually at RDP in support of undergraduates in the Social Sciences and Humanities. Having started in 2004, the conference has continued to grow and gain recognition from neighbouring institutions such as the University of Calgary. Those who present their original papers, presentations, or creative works at the conference also have the opportunity to have their work published in the Agora Journal, distributed by RDP.

== Campuses ==
Red Deer Polytechnic's Main Campus is situated in the city of Red Deer, midway between the larger cities of Edmonton and Calgary. The campus is located near the Queen Elizabeth II Highway, an hour and a half drive from either of the above cities. The main campus features a library, a bar, a restaurant, a Tim Hortons, a Starbucks, a Subway, an RBC Bank, and other food-related businesses.

=== Donald School of Business/Downtown Campus ===
The Donald School of Business (DSB) was situated in downtown Red Deer in the Millennium Centre building. It occupied floors 3, 4, and 5. In 2021, the Donald School of Business returned to the main Red Deer Polytechnic Campus.

=== Welikoklad Event Centre ===
Red Deer College has a third campus/building directly across from the DSB. It features a stage, a movie theatre, and an art gallery space. It is used for some shows, and for when RDP hosts the Backpacks to Briefcases for students.

=== Gary W. Harris Canada Games Centre ===
Completed in 2018 for the 2019 Canada Winter Games, the Gary W. Harris Canada Games Centre (popularly known as the GWH) features an ice arena (capable of Olympic sized ice), a performance gymnasium, a fitness centre, running/sprinting tracks, squash courts, and a massive court surface capable of holding four volleyball or two basketball games simultaneously.

== Athletics ==
Team and mixed sports Red Deer Polytechnic participate in include: basketball, soccer, volleyball, hockey, badminton, cross country running, curling, rodeo, dance, and (formerly) golf.

== Notable alumni ==
- k.d. lang
- Kari Matchett
- Tim Tamashiro
