= Canadian Collegiate Athletic Association =

National sports governing body in Canada

- Founded: 1974; 52 years ago
- No. of teams: 99
- Website: www.ccaa.ca

The Canadian Collegiate Athletic Association (CCAA, French: Association canadienne du sport collégial) is the national governing body for organized sports at the college level in Canada.

== National championships ==
CCAA members currently compete for national championships in the following sports:

- Badminton
- Basketball (men's and women's)
- Cross country running
- Curling
- Golf
- Soccer (men's and women's)
- Volleyball (men's and women's)

Past national championships include:

- Men's Hockey

== 2019–20 National Championships ==
- 2019 CCAA Golf National Championships

October 14-18, 2019
Host: Cégep André-Laurendeau
Location: Sorel-Tracy, QC

- 2019 CCAA Men's Soccer National Championship

November 6-9, 2019
Host: Durham College
Location: Oshawa, ON

- 2019 CCAA Women's Soccer National Championship

November 6-9, 2019
Host: Concordia University of Edmonton
Location: Edmonton, AB

- 2019 CCAA Cross-Country Running National Championships

November 8-9, 2019
Host: Grande Prairie Regional College
Location: Grande Prairie, AB

- 2020 CCAA Badminton National Championships

March 4-7, 2020
Host: University of Toronto Mississauga
Location: Mississauga, ON

- 2020 CCAA Men's Volleyball National Championship

March 11-14, 2020
Host: St. Thomas University (New Brunswick)
Location: Fredericton, NB

- 2020 CCAA Women's Volleyball National Championship

March 11-14, 2020
Host: Cégep Garneau
Location: Quebec City, QC

- 2020 CCAA Men's Basketball National Championship

March 18-21, 2020
Host: Humber College
Location: Etobicoke, ON

- 2020 CCAA Women's Basketball National Championship

March 18-21, 2020
Host: Vancouver Island University
Location: Nanaimo, BC

- 2020 CCAA Curling Championships

March 13-17
Location: Portage la Prairie, MB

== Member conferences ==
The CCAA currently has six member conferences:

Conference	Nickname	Founded	Members	Sports	Provinces	Ref.
Alberta Colleges Athletics Conference	ACAC	1964	17	22	Alberta Saskatchewan	
Atlantic Collegiate Athletic Association	ACAA	1967	10	12	New Brunswick; Nova Scotia; Prince Edward Island	
Manitoba Colleges Athletic Conference	MCAC		7		Manitoba	
Ontario Colleges Athletic Association	OCAA	1967	26	20	Ontario	
Pacific Western Athletic Association	PACWEST	1970	8	6	British Columbia	
Réseau du sport étudiant du Québec	RSEQ	1971	63		Quebec	

=== Former conferences ===
- Prairie Athletic Conference until 1994.

== Staff ==
- Chief Executive Officer: Sandra Murray-MacDonell
- Manager, Finance & Administration: Mary Winkenweder
- Manager, Marketing & Sponsorship: Brandon Stone
- Manager, Communication & Events: Nancy Paquette

== Executive Committee ==
- President: Vince Amato, Champlain College Saint-Lambert
- VP Eligibility: Jake McCallum, Langara College
- VP Finance: Brian McLennon, Douglas College
- VP Programs: Wade Kolmel, SAIT
- VP Marketing: Bob Murray, Prairie College
- VP Safe Sport: David Laliberte, Georgian College

== National Convenors ==
- Golf: Jay Shewfelt, St. Clair College
- Men's Soccer: David Munro, UNB Saint John alumni
- Women's Soccer: Marlene Ford, Conestoga College
- Cross-Country Running: Darcy Brioux, Centennial College
- Badminton: Andrew Harding, Dalhousie Agricultural Campus
- Men's Volleyball: Matthew Schnarr, Conestoga College
- Women's Volleyball: Beth Clark, Assiniboine College
- Men's Basketball: Jonathan Lambert, Keyano College
- Women's Basketball: Mai-Anh Nguyen, Vanier College

== Hall of Fame ==
=== 2019 inductees ===
Inducted on June 11, 2019 in Calgary AB

- Allan Ferchuk, Builder (ACAC)
- Al Bohonus, Builder (ACAC)
- Robert Day, Builder (ACAC)
- Perry Pearn, Coach (ACAC)
- Phil Allen, Coach (ACAC)
- Cor Ouwerkerk, Coach (ACAC)
- Laurie Hockridge, Athlete (ACAC)
- Lana Nicoll, Athlete (ACAC)
- Wen Wang, Athlete (ACAC)
- Brock Davidiuk, Athlete (ACAC)

=== 2018 inductees ===
Inducted on June 12, 2018 in Quebec City, QC

- Glenn Ruiter, Builder (RSEQ)
- John Davidson, Builder (RSEQ)
- Gino Brousseau, Athlete (RSEQ)
- Olivier Caron, Coach (RSEQ)
- Pascal Clément, Coach (RSEQ)
- Vicky Tessier, Athlete (RSEQ)
- Julieth Lewis, Athlete (RSEQ)
- Varouj Gurunlian, Athlete (RSEQ)
- Maxime Barabé, Athlete (RSEQ)
- Olga Hrycak, Coach (RSEQ)

=== 2017 inductees ===
Inducted on June 6, 2017 in Abbotsford, BC

- Theresa Hanson, Builder (PACWEST)
- Duncan McCallum, Coach (PACWEST)
- Joseph Iacobellis, Coach (PACWEST)
- Doug Abercrombie, Coach (PACWEST)
- Jennifer Wong, Athlete (PACWEST)
- Randy Nohr, Athlete (PACWEST)
- David Griffith, Athlete (PACWEST)
- Melissa Artuso, Athlete (PACWEST)
- Danielle (Gaudet) Hyde, Athlete (PACWEST)

=== 2016 inductees ===
Inducted on June 7, 2016 in Toronto, Ontario

- Peter Rylander, Builder (OCAA)
- Diana Drury, Builder (OCAA)
- Fred Wannamaker, Builder (OCAA)
- Paul Reader, Coach (OCAA)
- Vito Frijia, Athlete (OCAA)
- Marcy Skribe, Athlete (OCAA)
- Frank & Rozika Sulatycki, Coach (OCAA)
- Avery Brevett, Athlete (OCAA)
- Mike Katz, Coach (OCAA)
- Adam Morandini, Athlete (OCAA)

=== 2015 Inductees ===
Inducted on June 9, 2015 in Fredericton, New Brunswick

- Carl (Bucky) Buchanan, Coach (ACAA)
- Ivan (Chuck) Gullickson, Builder (OCAA)
- Jacques Cyr, Builder (RSEQ)
- Matt Fegan, Athlete (ACAA)
- Chris Hunter, Coach (RSEQ)
- Dave Douglas, Coach (ACAA)

=== 2014 inductees ===
Inducted on June 10, 2014 in Banff, Alberta

- Don Stouffer, Builder (ACAC)
- Alex Hoffman, Builder (OCAA)
- Ken Marchant, Builder (ACAA)
- Gerald (Jerry) N. Lloyd, Builder (PACWEST)
- Wayne Halliwell, Builder (RSEQ)
- Mal Stelck, Builder (PACWEST)
- John Cruickshank, Builder (OCAA)
- Yves Paquette, Builder (RSEQ)
- Jack Costello, Builder (OCAA)
- Irwin Strifler, Builder (ACAC)

== See also ==
- List of colleges in Canada
- Athletics Canada
- Canada Basketball
- Canadian Soccer Association
- Quebec Student Sports Federation
- Royal Canadian Golf Association
- U SPORTS, national sport governing body for universities in Canada
