= Charles William John Eliot =

Canadian academic and university administrator

3rd President of the University of Prince Edward Island
- In office 1985–1995
- Preceded by: Peter Meincke
- Succeeded by: Elizabeth Rollins Epperly

Personal details
- Born: December 8, 1928 Rawalpindi, Pakistan
- Died: May 20, 2008 (aged 79) Sackville, New Brunswick
- Spouse: Mary Williamson
- Children: Charles, Sophia, Nicholas, Johanna, Luke
- Education: University of Toronto

Charles William John Eliot CM (December 8, 1928 – May 20, 2008), commonly known as Willie Eliot or C.W.J. Eliot, was a Canadian academic and university administrator. Best known for being the third President of the University of Prince Edward Island, Eliot also served as President of the Classical Association of Canada and Chair of the Association of Atlantic Universities, among other positions. He was a member of the Order of Canada and was posthumously recognized as a founder of the University of Prince Edward Island.

== Early life and education ==
Eliot was born in Rawalpindi, then in British India to Canadian parents, William Edmund Cyril Eliot and Ann Catherine Gertrude nee McDougall. After returning to Canada, Eliot attended Trinity College of the University of Toronto, where he studied Classics and earned a Bachelor of Arts, Master of Arts, and Doctor of Philosophy in 1961. Eliot also did graduate work at the American School of Classics in Athens, Greece between 1952 and 1957.

== Career ==
Eliot began his academic career by teaching at the University of British Columbia from 1957 until 1971, when he returned to the American School of Classics as professor of archaeology. Between 1976 and 1985 Eliot held numerous positions at Mount Allison University, including Vice-President Academic, Secretary of the University Senate, and Dean of the Arts Faculty. In 1985 Eliot was appointed President and Vice-Chancellor of the University of Prince Edward Island, where he would oversee the opening of the Atlantic Veterinary College. In 1995 he finished his term as president and in 1996 was named President Emeritus. He retired from teaching in 1997.

Eliot was Chair of the Association of Atlantic Universities from 1989 until 1992 and President of the Classical Association of Canada from 1990 to 1992. From 1985 until 1995 he was on the Board of Governors for Holland College. Other notable positions held by Eliot include Chair of the Prince Edward Island Council of the Arts, Chair of the Prince Edward Island Ministerial Steering Committee on Culture, Chair of the Prince Edward Island Museum and Heritage Foundation, and President of the Community Museums Association of Prince Edward Island. He was also a member of the Government House Committee, Charlottetown Heritage Review Board, Canadian Social Sciences and Humanities Research Council, and the Board of Directors of the Society for the Study of Architecture in Canada.

Throughout his career Eliot lobbied for lowering tuition and making university more accessible, which was well documented beginning in his time at the University of British Columbia. A 1995 issue of Maclean's magazine quoted Eliot as having asked, "Who is going to accept a debt load of $20,000 to $40,000 to learn to appreciate poetry?". Upon receiving an honorary degree in 1999, a statement from St. Mary's University stated that Eliot's "advice and counsel is of enormous value in the shifting sands of academic life." After his death in 2008 a statement from the University of Prince Edward Island said that Eliot provided a "strong public voice on issues pertaining to the state of Canadian education and the plight of Canadian students".

== Honours and awards ==
In 1994 Eliot became a Member of the Order of Canada. He was also awarded the Queen Elizabeth II Golden Jubilee Medal and the 125th Anniversary of the Confederation of Canada Medal. In 1993 he received the Lescarbot Award from the Canadian Federal Government for contributing the most to the arts in his local community of Charlottetown, PEI. He was also awarded the Prix Nicole Raymond Award from the Federation of New Brunswick Faculty Associations. Eliot received honorary degrees from University of King's College (1988) and Saint Marry's University (1999).

Each year the C.W.J. Eliot Scholarship is given to the UPEI student who achieves the highest average in their first year of study. In 2015 Eliot was recognized as a founder of UPEI and the campus features an outdoor space named "Eliot Plaza".
