= Canadian University Synchronized Swimming League =

Governing body of university synchronized swimming in Canada

The Canadian University Artistic Swimming League (CUASL; French: Ligue Universitaire Canadienne de Natation Artistique - LUCNA), formerly the Canadian University Synchronized Swimming League (CUSSL; French: Ligue universitaire de nage synchronisee - LUCNS), is the national governing body of university synchronized swimming in Canada. It was established in the fall of 2001 and was incorporated under the Federal Laws of Canada. The league currently comprises 14 different universities from across the country. CUASL has competitions in solo, duet, and team events. CUASL also provides a competitive novice division for athletes who have never previously competed in synchronized swimming.

== History ==
=== The Beginning of University Synchro ===
University-level synchronized swimming in Canada dates back to 1946 when the Women's Intercollegiate Athletic Union (WIAU), composed of Ontario and Quebec universities, held a swimming meet at the University of Toronto. The swimming championship was divided into three components: speed racing, diving, and "ornamental" solo routine and style swimming (with or without music). The four original competitors at this meet were McGill University, Queen's University, University of Toronto, and University of Western Ontario, all of which but one are currently active in CUASL (Western is inactive as of 2012).

The universities are credited with being a great influence on the early years of the sport, as it was a time before many local synchro clubs existed. Often, swimmers would only first be introduced to synchronized swimming at the university level. Many girls became interested in the sport upon attending university, and some would compete at either the provincial level or the local level. These swimmers would also put on shows, and learn how to judge and coach. When the first Canada Games were held in 1967, some provinces relied on Physical Education graduates from their respective universities to produce a team, as synchro was still not very well-known. According to the Ontario University Athletics (OUA), regular university-league synchro championships began in 1971.

=== Recent ===
In May 2001, OUA took away competitive status from university synchronized swimming. The number of active competitive teams had dropped to 5, while the minimum requirement was 6. With the athletes not willing to give up the sport, a new league - The Canadian University Artistic Swimming League, was incorporated under the Federal Laws of Canada in the fall of 2001. The member teams at the time of establishment were Queen's University, Brock University, University of Western Ontario, University of Toronto, McGill University, and as a recreational member, University of Guelph. The first league championship meet was held at Queen's on February 10, 2002 with a total of 49 swimmers participating. In 2006, 13 universities were registered with the league for a total of 187 swimmers. In 2012, there were 215 swimmers in total from 14 registered universities.

=== Present ===
The Canadian University Artistic Swimming League continues to grow every year. There are currently 14 universities from 5 provinces that are part of the league. In order to be eligible to compete within the league, swimmers must be enrolled in an accredited university degree program. The competitive season runs from the start of the school year in September until mid-February. There are normally three main competitions that take place every season: Easterns, Westerns, and Nationals. There are also occasionally localized Invitational competitions. For all teams within Ontario and Quebec, Easterns and Nationals are compulsory competitions, while Nationals is the only compulsory competition for teams outside of these two provinces. Nationals is held in a Western province at least once every four years (if pool time is available). The events that swimmers can compete in are team, duet/trio, solo, and combo. There is also a novice division team, duet/trio, and solo event. In addition, there is also an athletes with a disability solo event. The newest members to the league are Carleton University and the University of Prince Edward Island, both of which joined in the 2012-2013 season.

== Member Schools ==
=== Current ===
University of Alberta, University of Calgary, Carleton University, University of Guelph, McGill University, McMaster University, University of Ottawa, University of Prince Edward Island, Queen's University, University of Toronto, Trent University, University of British Columbia, University of Victoria, University of Waterloo/Laurier University, Université Laval

=== Past ===
University of Western Ontario, Brock University, York University
