= Gregory Keefe =

Gregory Keefe is a Canadian academic and interim president and vice-chancellor of the University of Prince Edward Island. He is the former dean of the Atlantic Veterinary College.

== Early life ==
Keefe was born in Prince Edward Island and is married to Debbie Shea. He completed his bachelors of science from the Nova Scotia Agricultural College. He completed his Masters of Science from the University of Prince Edward Island. He did an MBA and Doctor of Veterinary Medicine from the University of Guelph.

== Career ==
Keef became the dean of the Atlantic Veterinary College of the University of Prince Edward Island, one of only five veterinary colleges in Canada, in March 2015.

Keefe was re-appointed dean of the Atlantic Veterinary College on 1 July 2021 for a three-year term. He was appointed president and vice-chancellor of the University of Prince Edward Island on 13 December 2021. He replaced Alaa Abd-El-Aziz, who was facing allegations of sexual harassments.

Keefe is the founder of Maritime Quality Milk. He is an investigator of the National Dairy Study. He is a recipient of the Norden Distinguished Teaching Award. He also has received an award from the Canadian Veterinary Medical Association. He oversaw the first convocation of the university in Egypt. He worked on plans to create a medical college for the University of Prince Edward Island.
