= Nutbrown =

Nutbrown is an English and Welsh surname. It may be derived from complexion of hair.

Notable people with the surname include:

- Cathy Nutbrown, British academic
- Dave Nutbrown, Canadian basketball coach
- Jamie Nutbrown (born 1981), New Zealand rugby player
