= UPEI Panthers Track and Field =

UPEI Panthers XC/TF
- University: University of Prince Edward Island
- Athletic director: Ron Annear
- Head coach: Damon MacDonald, Michael Peterson (Cross Country HC)
- Conference: Atlantic University Sport
- Location: Charlottetown, PEI
- Arena: UPEI Alumni CG Place

Uniforms
Main Kit	Alternate Kit

The UPEI Panthers cross country, track and field teams is an athletics team representing the UPEI Panthers athletics program of the University of Prince Edward Island. The team competes in the Atlantic University Sport conference and compete in U Sports. They compete in their home meets during the outdoor season at UPEI Alumni Canada Games Place

== History ==
The team was officially reestablished and began competing, starting in the 2017–2018 season.

=== Champions ===
==== 2024-2025 ====
Alaere Peterside, Women's High Jump

Helena Ikpotoken, Women's 300m

=== AUS All-Stars ===
==== 2025-2026 ====
Luc Doucette, Men's Cross Country (Second Team)

Joel Gallant, Men's Cross Country (Second Team)

==== 2022-2023 ====
Katie Richard, Women's Cross Country (Second Team)

==== 2021-2022 ====
Paige Chisholm, Women's Cross Country
