= University of Prince Edward Island Faculty of Medicine =

- Type: Faculty (medical school)
- Established: 2025; 1 year ago
- Affiliations: University of Prince Edward Island, Memorial University of Newfoundland
- Dean: Dr. Preston Smith
- Faculty: Faculty of Medicine
- Students: 20
- Location: 550 University Avenue; Charlottetown, Prince Edward Island; C1A 4P3, Charlottetown, Canada; 46.2581°N 63.1409°W
- Colours: Green
- Website: upei.ca/medicine

The Faculty of Medicine at the University of Prince Edward Island will be Canada's newest medical school when it opens in the fall of 2025. The University has partnered with the Memorial University of Newfoundland to establish the island's first medical school.

The UPEI Faculty of Medicine will be housed in a new building at the north end of campus.
