= Reginald C. Stuart =

Canadian historian (1943–2018)

Reginald Charles Stuart (September 1, 1943 – April 29, 2018) was a Canadian historian. The main focus of his work is on two major topics: the American experience with war as an instrument of policy and the relations of Canadians and Americans in what he terms Upper North America. He retired in 2013 and lived in Halifax, Nova Scotia.

== Career ==
Stuart was born on September 1, 1943, in Vancouver, British Columbia. He received his B.A. and M.A. at the University of British Columbia, and his PhD. at the University of Florida. He taught at Prince of Wales College from 1968 to 1969 and at the University of Prince Edward Island from 1969 to 1988. He came to Mount Saint Vincent University in Halifax as Dean of Arts and Science in 1988 and became a full-time faculty member in 1996.

== Awards ==
- Reginald C. Stuart won twice Merit Award for Scholarly Achievement at the University of Prince Edward Island (1982–1983) and (1987–1988).
- His United States Expansionism and British North America (1988) won the 1990 The Albert Corey Prize. This book is also one of the references to War of 1812.
- He won the MSVU Award for Research Excellence (2004).
- He won a Canadian-American Fulbright award in 2003 and became the distinguished Chair in North American Studies at the Woodrow Wilson International Center for Scholars in Washington, D.C., from January to June 2004.

== Selected publications ==
- Transnationalism in Canada-United States History Montreal: McGill-Queen's University Press, 2010. Co-editor with Michael D. Behiels.
- Civil-Military Relations during the War of 1812. Westport, CT: Praeger, 2009. This book is listed as one of the references to Vermont National Guard.
- Dispersed Relations: Americans and Canadians in Upper North America. Washington, DC: Co-published by Woodrow Wilson Center Press; and Baltimore, MD: Johns Hopkins University Press, 2007.
- Too Close? Too Far? Just Right? False Dichotomies and Canada-US Policy Making. Orono, Maine: Canadian-American Center, No. 66, April 2006.
- United States Expansionism and British North America, 1775-1871. Chapel Hill: the University of North Carolina Press, 1988. This book is also listed in the references to Manifest destiny.
- The First Seventy-Five Years. Vancouver: the Certified General Accountants Association of Canada, 1988.
- War and American Thought: From the Revolution to the Monroe Doctrine. Kent, Ohio: the Kent State University Press, 1982.
- The Half-way Pacifist: Thomas Jefferson's View of War. Toronto: University of Toronto Press, 1978.

Stuart's articles and reviews have appeared in The American Review of Canadian Studies, Diplomatic History, Canadian Journal of History, International History Review, Canadian Review of American Studies, the Journal of Church and State, Canadian Review of Studies in Nationalism, and the Tennessee Historical Quarterly. He contributed a chapter, "A Thousand Points of Partnership: Upper North America to 1931," in the book,Forgotten Partnership Redux: Canada-U.S. Relations in the 21st Century. Amherst, NY: Cambria Press, 2011, PP. 305–340.
