= Helen Andersen =

Canadian artist (1919–1995)

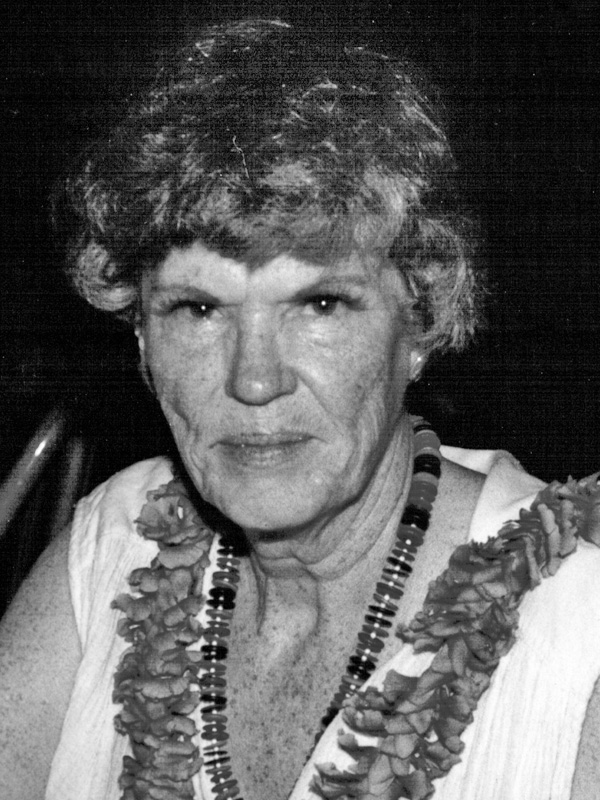
- Andersen in 1987
- Born: Helen Severson McKay Anderson; 14 July 1919; North Battleford, Saskatchewan, Canada
- Died: 23 December 1995 (aged 76); Saanich, British Columbia, Canada
- Occupation: Artist

Helen Andersen (14 July 1919 – 23 December 1995) was a Canadian artist. While best known for expressionist paintings about Pacific Northwest coast Indigenous peoples, she worked in varied styles. Her subjects were often women, themes expressing her convictions about social justice and strong anti-war sentiments.

== Life and career ==
Born Helen Severson McKay Anderson in North Battleford, Saskatchewan, Canada, she began painting in her teens, with some instruction from her physician father Dr. William Edmund Anderson, himself a "capable artist". Like her father, Andersen chose medicine as her profession, graduating as a Registered Nurse in 1940 from the Regina General Hospital School of Nursing. While working as a nurse she took art classes in her free time at the Vancouver School of Art, the University of British Columbia and the Victoria College of Art. She was eventually able to devote herself to her craft full time after receiving a grant from the Community Arts Council (Victoria, British Columbia). Her teachers included artists Bob Davidson, John Koerner, Joseph Plaskett, Kit Thorne, and Jacques de Tonnancour. She counted Bill Reid and Jack Shadbolt and Max Maynard among her artist friends.

As an artist, Andersen was mainly active in exhibitions in Vancouver and Victoria, British Columbia. However, she also had solo exhibitions on the international stage in Denmark, Iran, and Tanzania. She was a peace activist during much of her life. Her large painting, Nuclear Mother, recorded her horror of nuclear weapons, and earned her a special commendation from the mayor of Hiroshima. Painted in an art brut style, the work depicts a grieving mother holding her slain infant. Some of her works are a part of the permanent collections of the Sidney-North Saanich Library; Saanich Peninsula Hospital and the Ocean Sciences buildings.

Andersen died from cancer in Saanich, British Columbia, on 23 December 1995.

== Awards and recognition ==
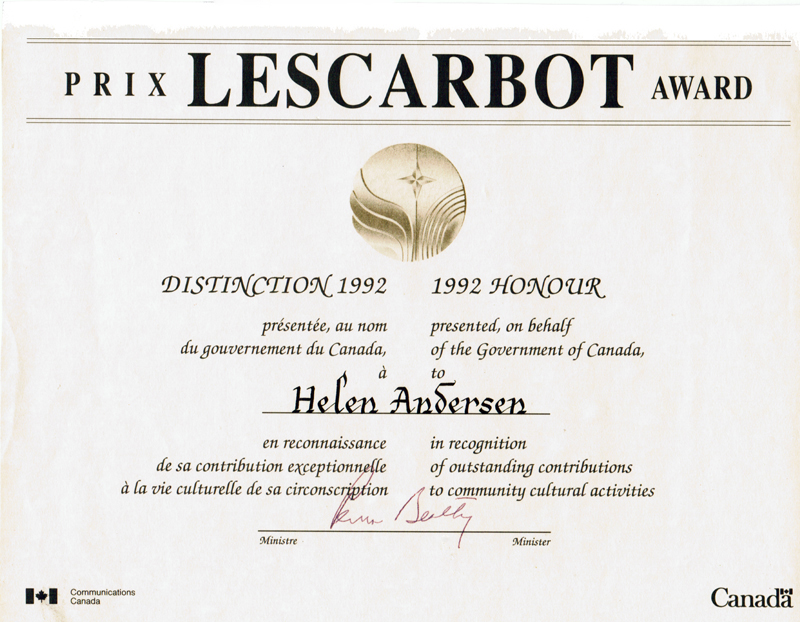
Helen Andersen's 1992 Lescarbot Award

Andersen received a 1992 Lescarbot Award from the Government of Canada, recognizing outstanding contributions to community cultural activities. These included promotion of other artists by mounting group shows, lecturing and demonstrating techniques on television and teaching in her own studio. She served twice as Secretary of the Federation of Canadian Artists; was a member of the Saanich Peninsula Art and Crafts Society; and Board Member of the Community Arts Council (1992).
