= Ronald James Baker =

Canadian academic administrator (1924–2020)

Ronald "Ron" James Baker

1st President of the University of Prince Edward Island
- In office 1969–1978
- Succeeded by: Peter Meincke

Personal details
- Born: 24 August 1924 London, England
- Died: 12 December 2020 (aged 96)
- Spouse(s): Helen "Jo" Gillespie Elder (1947); Frances Marilyn Frazer(1975)

Ronald "Ron" James Baker, OC (24 August 1924 – 12 December 2020) was a Canadian academic administrator. He was the first president of the University of Prince Edward Island (1969–1978).

Born in London, England, Baker served with the Royal Air Force from 1943 to 1947 and trained in Manitoba. In 1947, he emigrated to Canada. He received a Bachelor of Arts degree in 1951 and a Master of Arts degree in 1953 from the University of British Columbia both in English. From 1954 to 1956, he did graduate work in the School of Oriental and African Studies at the University of London. In 1962, he was appointed associate professor at the University of British Columbia. Baker's specialty was the History and Structure of the English Language. His classes were popular, especially among aspiring writers and poets on campus, such as Lionel Kearns, and George Bowering, who acknowledged Baker's influence on their writing careers.

While at UBC, Baker was involved in the production of John B. Macdonald's report, Higher Education in British Columbia and a Plan for the Future (1962), which led directly to the development of a second university (SFU) in the Lower Mainland. In 1964, he became the first faculty member hired by the President of Simon Fraser University, Patrick McTaggart-Cowan. He was the Director of Academic Planning at Simon Fraser University and served as the first head of the English Department.

From 1969 to 1978, he was president of the University of Prince Edward Island. He retired in 1991 and died in December 2020 at the age of 96.

== Honours ==
In 1978, he was made an Officer of the Order of Canada. He was awarded the Queen Elizabeth II Silver Jubilee Medal, the 125th Anniversary of the Confederation of Canada Medal, the Queen Elizabeth II Golden Jubilee Medal, and the Queen Elizabeth II Diamond Jubilee Medal. He has received honorary degrees from the University of New Brunswick (1970), Mount Allison University (1977), University of Prince Edward Island (1989), and Simon Fraser University (1990).
