= Kenneth Ozmon =

President of St Mary's University, Halifax (1931–2022)

Kenneth Lawrence Ozmon
- Born: September 4, 1931; Portsmouth, Virginia, U.S.
- Died: February 23, 2022 (aged 90)
- Known for: President of Saint Mary's University & Mount Allison University
- Awards: Order of Canada
- Scientific career
- Fields: Psychology
- Thesis: Proactive and retroactive effects of electroconvulsive shock on imprinting in Japanese quail (Coturnix coturnix japonica) (1968)

Kenneth Lawrence Ozmon, OC (September 4, 1931 – February 23, 2022) was an American-born Canadian university administrator and Canada's longest serving university president for 21 consecutive years.

== Biography ==
Born in Portsmouth, Virginia, he received a Bachelor of Arts degree in 1955 from St. Bernard College in Alabama, a Master of Arts in Psychology degree in 1963 from The Catholic University of America, and a PhD in Psychology in 1968 from the University of Maine.

He held various teaching positions in Alabama, Quebec (at Marianopolis College), Maine and California. From 1969 to 1972, he was the Associate Professor and Chairman of the Department of Psychology and Dean of Arts at the University of Prince Edward Island.

From 1979 to 2000, he was the President of Saint Mary's University in Halifax, Nova Scotia, serving for four terms. He was the thirteenth President of Mount Allison University. His term expired at the end of June 2006.

In 1998, he was made an Officer of the Order of Canada for his "outstanding contribution to education".

Ozmon died on February 23, 2022, at the age of 90.

== Sources ==
- "Canadian Who's Who 1997 entry". University of Toronto Press.
- "Mount Allison's New President". Mount Allison University. Archived from the original on 2011-07-06.
