= John Angus Weir =

University president (1930-2007)

John Angus Weir (October 29, 1930 – August 28, 2007) was the fourth president of Wilfrid Laurier University, serving from 1982 until his retirement in 1992. Weir was born to J. Angus and Mary in Charlottetown, Prince Edward Island, on October 29, 1930. He was usually called "Jack". He has a brother named Robert. Weir graduated from St. Dunstan's University (now known as the University of Prince Edward Island with a Bachelor of Arts in 1953. He then moved to London, Ontario, where he received his master of business administration degree from the University of Western Ontario in 1955. Weir moved to Kitchener, Ontario to work at a company called Electrohome.

He later moved to South Bend, Indiana, to continue his education. This resulted in him receiving his PhD in economics from the University of Notre Dame in 1964. Weir and his new wife, Ann, moved to Winnipeg, Manitoba, where he took the position of professor at the University of Manitoba. His family moved back to Kitchener-Waterloo in 1965 so that Weir could take a position at Wilfrid Laurier University (then known as Waterloo Lutheran University) as a professor and chairman of the economics department from 1968 to 1978. He became vice-president of academics from 1978 to 1982, and then he eventually became the university's president from 1982 until his retirement in 1992. While university president, Weir helped form the undergraduate music therapy program in the university's Faculty of Music on February 16, 1987.

He married Ann in 1959 and had four sons. Weir died at Queen Elizabeth Hospital in Charlottetown, Prince Edward Island, Canada.
