= Alaa Abd-El-Aziz =

Canadian academic

Alaa Abd-El-Aziz is a Canadian academic and former president of the University of Prince Edward Island.

== Early life ==
Abd-El-Aziz completed his bachelor's and master's at the Ain Shams University in 1985 and 1989 respectively. He completed a PhD at the University of Saskatchewan in 1989.

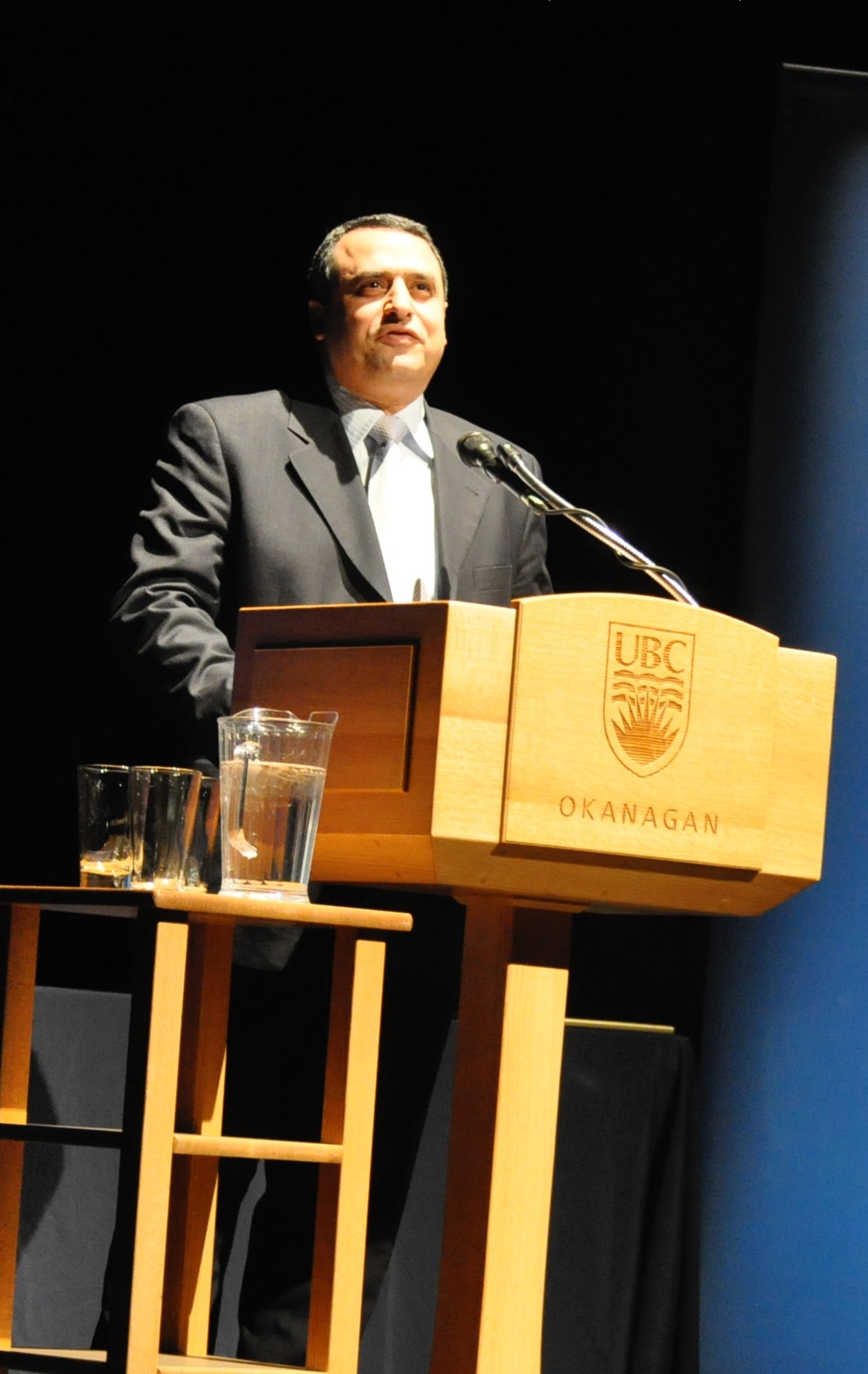
Abd El Aziz in 2010

== Career ==
Abd-El-Aziz joined the University of Toronto as a lecturer in 1989. In 1990, he joined the University of Winnipeg as an assistant professor and became a full professor in 1997 and worked there till 2006.

From 1991 to 2008, Abd-El-Aziz was an adjunct professor at the University of Manitoba. He was also an adjunct at the Université de Sherbrooke and the University of Winnipeg.

Abd-El-Aziz was the former Provost of the University of British Columbia Okanagan. From 2006 to 2011, he was the professor of chemistry at the University of British Columbia Okanagan.

=== University of Prince Edward Island ===
Alaa Abd-El-Aziz assumed the presidency of University of Prince Edward Island (UPEI) in July 2011 after being selected in November 2010.

Abd-El-Aziz oversaw a growing enrolment at UPEI, with the number of international students growing from 536 in 2012 to 1,400 from 90 countries in 2021, as well as the expansion of its nursing school and the creation of a faculty of medicine in partnership with Memorial University of Newfoundland.

In 2013, university employees filed sexual harassment complaints against Abd-El-Aziz before the P.E.I. Human Rights Commission. According to Tom Cullen, then-chairman of UPEI's board of governors, it involved allegations of "inappropriate comments between colleagues". Later the same year, UPEI reached a settlement with the two complainants, with non-disclosure agreements signed by all parties involved.

Abd-El-Aziz's contract was renewed in 2015, 2018 and 2021. Atlantic Business Magazine declared him innovator of the year in 2020.

Abd-El-Aziz agreed to stay at the university until 2025 but resigned in December 2021 citing health reasons following a report by CBC News alleging that numerous non-disclosure agreements at UPEI had created "a culture of silence and fear" on campus and a toxic workplace. Following Alaa Abd-El-Aziz's resignation, Greg Keefe was named Interim President and Vice-Chancellor on December 13, 2021.

Appointed by UPEI a few days after the resignation, law firm Rubin Thomlinson found 29 non-disclosure agreements were signed at UPEI in the decade Abd-El-Aziz was in charge.
