= Trudi Le Caine =

Canadian art patron (1911–1999)

Trudi Le Caine CM
- Born: Gertrude Janowski; 1911; Passau, Bavaria, Germany
- Died: September 5, 1999 (aged 87–88); Ottawa, Ontario, Canada
- Organizations: Le Groupe de la Place Royale; Opera Lyra Ottawa; Council for the Arts in Ottawa
- Known for: Arts patronage, children's music education, Rideau Canal skating initiative
- Spouse: Hugh Le Caine
- Awards: Member of the Order of Canada; Lescarbot Award; Victor Tolgesy Arts Award

Trudi Le Caine, CM (née Gertrude Janowski, 1911 – September 5, 1999) was an arts patron involved with local and national arts initiatives in Ottawa, Ontario, Canada.

Born in Passau, Bavaria, she spent her youth in Teplitz-Schönau/Teplice-Šanov, Czechoslovakia before joining her stepfather, Arnold Walter, in Berlin, where he was a music editor and critic for the leftist journals Die Weltbühne and Vorwärts. After fleeing Germany following the Nazi seizure of power in 1933, she lived first in Spain (which she had to leave after the outbreak of the Spanish Civil War in 1936) and France (where she studied at the Sorbonne) before emigrating to Canada to join her parents. She settled in Ottawa in 1942, where her involvement with Le Groupe de la Place Royale, Opera Lyra Ottawa and the Council for the Arts in Ottawa led to recognition and awards such as the Order of Canada, the Lescarbot Award and the Victor Tolgesy Arts Award.

Though she had no children of her own, she made children's music education one of her causes, helping establish the Ottawa Children's Concerts in 1946 and later becoming a proponent of the Orff Approach (Orff Schulwerk, also called Music for Children) in music education in the Ottawa area. LeCaine also taught French at Broadview Public School in Ottawa. She also convinced the National Capital Commission to open the Rideau Canal during the winter for skating, which has now become famous as the world's longest skating rink.

In her honour, the Community Foundation of Ottawa-Carleton maintains the Trudi LeCaine Fund.

She was close to 50 when she married Hugh Le Caine, Canadian physicist and pioneer electronic musician.
