= William E. Andrew =

Seventh chancellor-University of Prince Edward Island/Canada

- Scientific career
- Workplaces: University of Prince Edward Island

William E. Andrew is the seventh chancellor of the University of Prince Edward Island, Canada. He was elected in 2004 and reappointed in 2009 with a term expiring in 2013.
