= Fernand Lindsay =

Father Fernand Lindsay, CM, CQ (often known simply as Father Lindsay, French: Père Lindsay) (May 11, 1929 – March 17, 2009) was a Canadian churchman, educator, organist and festival director. He founded the Lanaudière International Music Festival a major classical music festival, and was awarded the Order of Canada and National Order of Quebec, as well as the Calixa-Lavallée and Lescarbot Awards.
