= Richard Raiswell =

Canadian historian

- Born: 1966 (age 59–60); Middlesbrough, England
- Occupation: Non-fiction writer

Academic work
- Institutions: University of Prince Edward Island

Richard Raiswell (born January 1966) is a historian at University of Prince Edward Island, Canada, and Honorary Research Fellow in the School of Graduate Studies, University of New Brunswick, Fredericton. He teaches classes on medieval and Renaissance History, as well as the History of Ideas, specialising, in particular, on premodern geography and exploration, and demonology..

Not much is known about his early life beyond the fact that he was born in Middlesbrough in the UK, immigrating to Canada in 1979 where he eventually became a citizen. His education includes a B.A. in History from Carleton University (1992), with an M.A. in Medieval Studies (1995), and a Ph.D. in History both from the University of Toronto (2003).

His work is centred primarily on the history of the devil and on demonology. This includes important articles on demon possession, including on the Warboys case (1589-1593) and that of Katheren Malpas (1621-1622), discovered to be fraudulent after proceedings in Star Chamber. He has also written extensively on the 17th-century English traveller Edward Terry, particularly on his demonology, and its relationship to English perceptions of India. Other major works include the edited collections The Routledge History of the Devil (2025), Knowing Demons, Knowing Spirits in the Early Modern Period (2018) both with Michelle Brock (Washington and Lee University) and David Winter (Brandon University), and The Devil in Society in Premodern Europe (Centre for Reformation and Renaissance Studies, 2012) with Peter Dendle (Penn State Mont Alto).

He is the co-editor of two other collections of academic essays: Evidence in the Age of the New Sciences (2018) with James Lancaster and Shell Games: Studies in Frauds, Scams and Deceit in Early Modern Culture, 1300-1650 with Mark Crane and Margaret Reeves (2004).

He is one of the founders of the journal Preternature: Critical and Historical Studies of the Preternatural (with Kirsten Uszkalo) and served as its book review editor from 2010 to 2017. He was President of Scientiae, a research group dedicated to the study of early modern knowledge making from 2019 to 2023. He was the editor of the Ficino listserv, dedicated to the discussion of Renaissance European history, literature and culture from 1999 to 2024, and was an adviser on the Witches in Early Modern England Project (2009–2011).

Raiswell has been featured on various podcasts including several episodes about the history of the devil and about the Malleus maleficarum on The Thing About Witch Hunts Podcast, with Josh Hutchinson and Sarah Jack. From 2010 to 2017 he was a frequent contributor to CBC Radio, with a regular column on provincial politics on CBC Prince Edward Island's Mainstreet, and occasional spots on Island Morning where he discusses aspects of premodern magic, demonology and the occult. He has also appeared in the Smithsonian Network's Treasures Decoded, in which he argued against the authenticity of the Vinland Map.

He is a cricket enthusiast, and has published a popular article on the history of cricket on Prince Edward Island in the nineteenth century.

== Selected publications ==
- Richard Raiswell, Michelle Brock and David Winter, The Routledge History of the Devil Routledge: 2025. ISBN 978-0-367-56142-0.
- Richard Raiswell with Peter Dendle The Devil in Society in Premodern Europe. CRRS. 2012.
- Richard Raiswell with Mark Crane and Margaret Reeves, Shell Games: Studies in Frauds, Scams and Deceit in Early Modern Culture, 1300-1650. Toronto. 2004. ISBN 978-0-7727-2023-8.
- Contributor to "The Historical Encyclopedia of World Slavery", 1997, ISBN 0874368855
