= Edward MacDonald =

Canadian historian

George Edward MacDonald CM
- Citizenship: Canadian
- Title: Chair of the Faculty of Arts
- Awards: Member of the Order of Canada (2023)

Academic work
- Discipline: History
- Sub-discipline: Canadian political history; Atlantic Canada; Prince Edward Island
- Institutions: University of Prince Edward Island
- Notable works: If You're Stronghearted: Prince Edward Island in the 20th Century (2000)

George Edward MacDonald CM was the Chair of the Faculty of Arts at the University of Prince Edward Island in Charlottetown. He is an Associate Professor of history, teaching about Canadian political history, Atlantic Canada and Prince Edward Island.

== Writing ==
- If You're Stronghearted: Prince Edward Island in the 20th Century (2000).
- The Landscapes of Confederation (2010)
- Time and a Place, An Environmental History of Prince Edward Island

== Honours ==
- Dr. MacDonald was honored with the Award of Honour by PEI Museum and Heritage Foundation in 2017.
- Lieutenant Governor's Award

He was appointed as a Member of the Order of Canada in 2023.
