= Dr. Oakley, Yukon Vet =

American television series

- Directed by: Dean Bushala
- Presented by: Dr. Michelle Oakley
- Country of origin: United States
- No. of seasons: 12
- No. of episodes: 92

Production
- Executive producers: Rich Confalone; Richard Dowlearn; Kip Prestholdt; Jenny Apostol; Tracy Rudolph; Amber Engelmann
- Producer: Kip Prestholdt

Original release
- Network: Nat Geo WILD
- Release: April 12, 2014 – December 8, 2023

Dr. Oakley, Yukon Vet is an American television series on Nat Geo Wild. The show premiered April 4, 2014. The show stars Dr. Michelle Oakley and follows her adventures usually around her home base of Haines Junction, Yukon and Haines, Alaska. She studied Zoology at the University of Michigan, getting her degree in 1991. She then attended the Atlantic Veterinary College in Prince Edward Island, Canada and interned at the Calgary Zoo. In 2024, the show ended after its 12th season.

All about Dr. Michelle Oakley

== Veterinarian ==
- Dr. Michelle Oakley D.V.M.

she has 2 homes because of what she does

== Family ==
- Shane Oakley, husband
- Sierra Oakley, Daughter and vet assistant
- Maya Oakley, Daughter and vet assistant
- Willow Oakley, Daughter and vet assistant

== Narrator ==
- Zac Fine
- Dr. Michelle Oakley

== Episodes ==
Season	Episodes	Originally released	
Season	Episodes	First released	Last released
1	6	April 12, 2014	May 17, 2014
2	10	November 1, 2014	January 3, 2015
3	8	March 19, 2016	May 14, 2016
4	8	October 1, 2016	November 19, 2016
5	10	October 14, 2017	December 9, 2017
6	11	October 6, 2018	December 22, 2018
7	12	September 28, 2019	December 14, 2019
8	9	March 21, 2020	May 16, 2020
9	11	March 13, 2021	May 1, 2021
10	14	October 9, 2021	November 27, 2021
11	10	April 8, 2023	June 10, 2023

=== Season 1 (2014) ===
No. overall	No. in season	Title	Original release date
1	1	"Fly Like an Eagle"	April 12, 2014
Veterinarian Michelle Oakley, who tends to the animals of the Yukon territory of Canada, performs a check-up on a team of sled dogs in the premiere of this reality series. Also: a dairy-cow fertility exam; a dog with a face full of quills; an owl with a broken wing; a birthday fishing trip; a visit to the Yukon Wild Life Preserve.
2	2	"One Angry Muskox"	April 19, 2014
Dr. Oakley visits a horse farm to test the animals for a disease that is spread by flies. Later, she performs an exam on an ornery muskox and discusses care options for a dog with a blocked windpipe.
3	3	"Caribou Down"	April 26, 2014
Dr. Oakley heads out to assess a cow with infertility issues. Later, she examines a caribou with growths on its nose and realizes it's time for her dog to be spayed.
4	4	"Reindeer Pains"	May 3, 2014
Dr. Oakley treats a young reindeer with an umbilical hernia. Also: a cat with diabetes; a dog with an ailing bum; a parrot that needs grooming.
5	5	"Oakley Get Your Blow Gun"	May 10, 2014
Dr. Oakley takes her daughter for a ride along as she does her normal rounds treating both the domestic and wild animals of the Yukon.
6	6	"Winter Is Coming"	May 17, 2014
Dr. Oakley examines a goat owned by a blind farmer. Later, she corrals wild horses using a helicopter and gives an ornery owl a checkup.

=== Season 2 (2015) ===
No. overall	No. in season	Title	Original release date
7	1	"Mush Madness"	November 1, 2014
Dr. Oakley is on hand at a sled dog race to tend to the needs of its competitors in the Season 2 opener. Also: A feral cat gets a checkup; a muskox gets a pedicure.
8	2	"Flying Caribou"	November 8, 2014
Dr. Oakley helps save a local population of caribou in Quebec.
9	3	"When Coyotes Attack"	November 15, 2014
A goat is left in critical condition after coyotes attack Dr. Oakley's property.
10	4	"A Face Full of Quills"	November 22, 2014
Dr. Oakley assists a caribou with an infection in its leg. Later, she tends to a ornery donkey and gives a pregnant cow a checkup.
11	5	"Here Comes Cari-Boo-Boo"	December 6, 2014
Birds migrating to the Yukon territory for the spring create extra work for Dr. Oakley.
12	6	"Leopards, Wolf Pups & Grizzlies, Oh My!"	December 6, 2014
Dr. Oakley's services are in demand as winter approaches.
13	7	"The Missing Lynx"	December 13, 2014
Dr. Oakley is concerned for her daughter who is on an endurance test out in the bush.
14	8	"Bull Steam Ahead"	December 20, 2014
Animals reluctant to participate during mating season are examined by Dr. Oakley.
15	9	"Moose on the Loose"	December 27, 2014
Dr. Oakley and her daughters visit Anchorage, Alaska.
16	10	"Havoc in the Herd"	January 3, 2015
Dr. Oakley tends to a herd of bison.

=== Season 3 (2016) ===
No. overall	No. in season	Title	Original release date
17	1	"Yak Attack"	March 19, 2016
Dr. Oakley treats an eagle that's been tarred. Later, she prepares for her oldest child to leave the house.
18	2	"Steer Clear"	March 26, 2016
Dr. Oakley deals with some dangerous patients.
19	3	"Taming of the Wolverine"	April 16, 2016
Dr. Oakley works at a wolverine at a rehabilitation clinic in Alaska.
20	4	"Baby Boom"	April 2, 2016
A calf; a litter of puppies; a pregnant goat.
21	5	"Got Moose Juice?"	April 23, 2016
Dr. Oakley treats a baby moose with life-threatening indigestion in Alaska.
22	6	"Midnight Madness"	April 30, 2016
Dr. Oakley treats a family of dogs after answering a midnight emergency call.
23	7	"Warts and All"	May 7, 2016
Dr. Oakley helps a young caribou with fast-growing, giant warts on his face and a mountain goat with a life-threateningly mangled foot.
24	8	"Cat Out of Hell"	May 14, 2016
Dr. Oakley assists a Himalayan yak, a prickly porcupine and a hairless cat.

=== Season 4 (2016) ===
No. overall	No. in season	Title	Original release date
25	1	"One Mad Mama"	October 1, 2016
Dr. Oakley examines a dog with paw problems
26	2	"Poking the Bear"	October 8, 2016
Two black bears are examined.
27	3	"Raging Bison"	October 15, 2016
A couple of wood bison are examined before they are released back into the wild.
28	4	"No Bull"	October 22, 2016
Dr. Oakley investigates an inbreeding issue with a herd of American bison on Prince Edward Island.
29	5	"When Horses Fly"	October 22, 2016
Dr. Oakley herds wild horses in the Yukons.
30	6	"When Cows Fight Back"	November 5, 2016
Dr. Oakley castrates a calf on a remote island.
31	7	"Bad News Bear"	November 12, 2016
Dr. Oakley attempts to save a brown bear from drowning.
32	8	"Bear Brawl"	November 16, 2016
Enhanced episode. The doc travels to a bear sanctuary and ends up in the middle of a bear brothers battle.

=== Season 5 (2017) ===
No. overall	No. in season	Title	Original release date
33	1	"Alaska Calling"	October 14, 2017
In the Season 5 premiere, Dr. Oakley travels to Alaska and helps various animals through the various seasons of Alaska.
34	2	"The Boar Ultimatum"	October 14, 2017
Dr. Oakley is on an airborne mission to track down a wild boar.
35	3	"Wild Wild Wolverine"	October 21, 2017
Dr. Oakley traps a snarling wolverine to learn more about her ferocious species.
36	4	"Bear Trapped"	October 28, 2017
Dr. Oakley is perched in the trees waiting for a hungry bear and a reindeer needs help.
37	5	"Bovine Intervention"	November 4, 2017
Dr. Oakley treats two disgruntled pigs and a calf banding turns into a wild cow chase.
38	6	"License to Quill"	November 11, 2017
Harper the dog needs Dr. Oakley's expertise when a chance encounter leads to a prickly situation with severe consequences.
39	7	"Hump Day"	November 18, 2017
Dr. Michelle Oakley faces off with squealing boars and neuters an aggressive camel.
40	8	"Wily Coyote"	November 25, 2017
Dr. Oakley is shocked by an elusive coyote; a seal must have emergency surgery.
41	9	"Reindeer Rodeo"	December 2, 2017
Dr. Oakley checks up on a reindeer herd and looks at a moose's puzzling giant belly.
42	10	"Whoa, Baby!"	December 9, 2017
Dr. Oakley is on the move in Alaska tending to baby-related needs.

=== Season 6 (2018) ===
No. overall	No. in season	Title	Original release date
43	1	"The Riddle of the Lynx"	October 6, 2018
An emergency c-section keeps Dr. Oakley up all night and a horse kicks her into shape.
44	2	"Bison Business"	October 13, 2018
Dr. Oakley races the clock wrangling bison; and work horses complicate a routine procedure.
45	3	"Dances With Ibexes"	October 20, 2018
An unresponsive dog leaves Dr. Oakley stumped; and the team heads to France to track ibex.
46	4	"Mother Mayhem"	October 27, 2018
Dr. Oakley juggles being a full-time vet, wife, and mom, all with a sense of humor and devotion.
47	5	"Wild Cow Chase"	November 3, 2018
Dr. Michelle Oakley chases wild cows. Sierra shows off her Yukon chops.
48	6	"Swedish Bears"	November 10, 2018
Dr. Oakley travels to Sweden to learn about bears. Also: a dog has a mysterious eye mass.
49	7	"Up to the Tusk"	November 17, 2018
The future of a reindeer herd is in Dr. Oakley's hands as she examines two breeder bulls.
50	8	"Muskox in Arms"	November 24, 2018
Dr. Oakley checks out a baby muskox while the crew herds horses using the camera drone.
51	9	"Mommy Deer-est"	December 8, 2018
Dr. Michelle Oakley treats many animal mothers in the Yukon.
52	10	"Yukon Do It"	December 15, 2018
Even with Dr. Oakley's vast experience, there's always a first time for everything.
53	11	"All Hooves on Deck"	December 22, 2018
Dr. Oakley seeks the help of others with difficult cases.

=== Season 7 (2019) ===
No. overall	No. in season	Title	Original release date
54	1	"Blazing Bison"	September 28, 2019
A cat's bladder problem puts Dr. Oakley in a tricky spot; and rowdy bison need wrangling.
55	2	"Foal's Gold"	October 5, 2019
Dr. Oakley castrates a once-wild stallion, and everyone holds their breath to see if he succeeded in getting three mares pregnant.
56	3	"Bears on a Plane"	October 12, 2019
Dr. Oakley helps out two bear cubs as they travel to a new home.
57	4	"No Horsing Around"	October 19, 2019
Dr. Oakley tries to find what caused the horse's nosebleed.
58	5	"Don't Poke a Sleeping Porcupine"	October 26, 2019
Dr. Michelle Oakley helps domestic pets, farm animals, and endangered wildlife in the isolated regions of the Yukon.
59	6	"One Clever Bison"	November 2, 2019
Dr. Oakley helps out a bison.
60	7	"The Stricken Chicken"	November 9, 2019
Dr. Oakley sees two stubborn muskoxen, a particularly wily coyote and a badly burned dog.
61	8	"Running with Reindeer"	November 16, 2019
Dr. Oakley participates in a race that pits people against reindeer.
62	9	"Yukon 911"	November 23, 2019
When animal disasters strike, Dr. Michelle Oakley is the first responder!
63	10	"Antlers, Shoulders, Knees, and Hooves"	November 30, 2019
Big' may be an understatement for many of Dr. Michelle Oakley's patients.
64	11	"Under the Yukon Sun"	December 7, 2019
Dr. Michelle Oakley battles the elements to take care of animals.
65	12	"Wild Things!"	December 14, 2019

=== Season 8 (2020) ===
No. overall	No. in season	Title	Original release date
66	1	"The Big Bad Wolf"	March 21, 2020
Dr. Oakley head to the AWCC with her daughters to try and bond with a lone wolf.
67	2	"Law of the Claw"	March 28, 2020
Dr. Oakley and Dr. Doyle work on a horse that is suffering with a leg infection.
68	3	"The Miracle Dog"	April 4, 2020
Dr. Oakley care for a sick reindeer; and performs a surgery on a canine burn victim.
69	4	"A Hoarse Horse"	April 11, 2020
Dr. Oakley finds a fox in need, and the family rallies to give it a shot at survival.
70	5	"Squawk Off!"	April 18, 2020
Dr. Oakley explores what's ailing a sick German shepherd and treats a prickly peacock.
71	6	"I Quill Survive"	April 25, 2020
Dr. Oakley helps a horse with a strange lump and deals with a bull that's losing weight.
72	7	"At the Cow Wash"	May 2, 2020
Dr. Oakley investigates what's ailing reindeer at the Alaska Wildlife Conservation Center.
73	8	"Porcupine Posse"	May 9, 2020
Dr. Oakley removes a lump from a French bulldog. Then, he investigates a cat's seizures.
74	9	"Rescuers Down Under"	May 16, 2020
Dr. Oakley heads to Australia to helps the animals that are affected by the wildfires.

=== Season 9 (2021) ===
No. overall	No. in season	Title	Original release date
75	1	"Don't Be Mean, Wolverine"	March 13, 2021
Dr. Oakley sees a wolverine with a growing lump in its side and makes a shocking discovery during a reindeer castration.
76	2	"Goodnight Musk Ox"	March 20, 2021
A puppy emergency and a wold in danger of losing an eye.
77	3	"The Very Hungry Reindeer"	March 27, 2021
Testing a dangerously thin reindeer with a bellyache.
78	4	"Don't Cry She-Wolf"	April 3, 2021
Dr. Oakley helps a skinny bison struggling to get food, spays a wolf at the bottom of the pack and sees an old cat missing teeth.
79	5	"A Vet's Life is a Highway"	April 3, 2021
80	6	"Dr. O and the Three Bears"	April 17, 2021
A dog that was attacked, a guinea pig with raspy breathing
81	7	"Oh Deer!"	April 10, 2021
Dr. Oakley helps an old horse with a dental issue.
82	8	"Spit and Run"	April 24, 2021
83	9	"Sweet Dreams and Made of Oakleys"	April 24, 2021
84	10	"Lynx be a Lady"	May 1, 2021
85	11	"If Looks Could Quill"	May 8, 2021
86	12	"Minkus Stinkus"	May 15, 2021

=== Season 10 (2021) ===
No. overall	No. in season	Title	Original release date
87	1	"You Ain't Nothin' But a Hound Dog"	October 9, 2021
Dr. Oakley treats a Sitka deer with a limp and a feisty alpaca-llama cross.
88	2	"Even If It Quills Me"	October 16, 2021
Dr. Oakley treats a rescued pig and a dog with a porcupine vendetta.
89	3	"Flip the Pig"	October 23, 2021
Dr. Oakley learns to flip a pig and treats a dog at risk of losing a paw.
89	4	"Dances with Dachshunds"	October 23, 2021
Dr. Oakley treats an off-the-grid dachshund and an emotional support pig.
89	5	"Hold Your Horses"	October 23, 2021
Dr. Oakley escorts a horse on a boat and treats a bull with a limp.
89	6	"This Little Piggy Had an Ouchie"	October 23, 2021
Dr. Oakley treats a limping bull bison and a dog with a mammary mass.
89	7	"I'll Tell you Wattle Want"	October 23, 2021
Dr. Oakley treats a horse with a limp and an overweight dog.
89	8	"Pups in the Oven"	October 23, 2021
Dr. Oakley treats a dog with a bloated stomach and a cow with a lumpy jaw.
89	9	"Duck Duck Chicken"	October 23, 2021
Dr. Oakley preg checks rabbits, helps a sore duck, and relieves a reindeer.
89	10	"Chicken of the Sea"	October 23, 2021
Dr. Oakley treats a chunky chicken and a calf that was attacked by a bear.
89	11	"Hug for a Pug"	October 23, 2021
Dr. Oakley treats an enormous bull and her own family’s pet pug.
89	12	"No Pot to Pee In"	October 23, 2021
Dr. Oakley treats a miracle moose and a puppy that was hit by a car.
Special
90	-	"Vetsgiving"	November 26, 2021
91	-	"Vetsgiving"	November 27, 2021

=== Season 11 (2023) ===
No. overall	No. in season	Title	Original release date
92	1	"Cat Got Your Tongue"	April 8, 2023
Dr. Oakley treats a cat that swallowed a string, a pregnant reindeer with cancer, and a drooling porcupine.
93	2	"Grandma Knows Best"	April 15, 2023
Dr. Oakley treats an old bison with a limp, a reindeer with a cracked antler, and a litter of newborn puppies struggling to survive.
94	3	"The Pug We Love"	April 22, 2023
Dr. Oakley investigates a lump on a beloved horse, tries to outsmart a herd of bison using horses and helicopters, and fights for the life of their pet pug with a bold new treatment.
95	4	"Dirty Rotten Chompers"	April 29, 2023
Dr. Oakley scrambles to save a dog after it ingests human supplements, operates on a deer's suspicious lump, and removes the eye of an alpaca.
96	5	"Boatload of Bull"	May 6, 2023
Dr. Oakley transports a bull and horse across the sea, performs a cuteness check on chinchillas, and treats a working dog with a suspicious limp.
97	6	"Like Mother, Like Daughter"	May 13, 2023
The team performs a checkup on a pair of scrappy lynx and tricks two reindeer into cooperating for an important procedure. Sierra takes charge on clinic day.
98	7	"No Moosetakes"	May 20, 2023
Dr. Oakley treats a young musk ox with a hair loss problem, performs a checkup on a moose in front of an unexpected audience, and operates on a dog’s unusual mass.
99	8	"Just Another Manic Meatball"	May 27, 2023
The Oakleys head back to the Yukon to check over 100 cattle before helping an aggressive mini mule and a calf with breathing trouble.
100	9	"Don't Have a Cow"	June 3, 2023
Dr. Oakley diagnoses a friendly ferret and performs surgery on a kitten with a bulging eye. Sierra attempts to preg check a miniature cow.
101	10	"Eagles and Beagles"	June 10, 2023
Dr. Oakley treats a dog with a severely infected paw, a cat that's chewed his own tail, and rappels down a steep cliff to a golden eagle nest.
