= Peter Dendle =

American folklorist

Peter J. Dendle
- Born: 1968 (age 57–58); United States
- Known for: The Zombie Movie Encyclopedia*; *Demon Possession in Anglo‑Saxon England*; studies in monster folklore and cryptozoology

Academic background
- Education: University of Toronto (PhD, English, 1998); Yale University (MA, English, 1991); University of Kentucky (MA, Philosophy, 1993 and BA, English & Philosophy, 1990)

Academic work
- Institutions: Penn State Mont Alto
- Main interests: Folklore, Medieval literature, Monster studies, Cryptozoology, Film studies

Peter Dendle is a professor of English at Penn State Mont Alto, teaching classes on folklore, 20th and 21st century representations of the Middle Ages, Old and Middle English (language and literature), and the monstrous (in film, folklore, and society). Dendle has written books and articles on a number of topics, including cryptozoology, philology, the demonic in literature, zombie films, and Medieval plants and medicine. His work on zombies was featured by NPR.

== Career ==
His education includes a B.A. in English and Philosophy (1990) and an M.A. in Philosophy (1993), both from the University of Kentucky, as well as an M.A. in English from Yale (1991) and a PhD in English from the University of Toronto (1998).

In 2007, National Geographic featured some of the research results from Dendle's monograph Demon Possession in Anglo-Saxon England. Other recent works include peer-reviewed articles on cryptozoology, medieval charms, demon possession, gender in Old Norse and Anglo-Saxon literature, and a translation and analysis of The Old English Life of Malchus and Two Vernacular Tales from the Vitas Patrum in MS Cotton Otho C.i: which appeared in English Studies, 2010.

He is the co-editor of three collections of academic essays on various aspects of the preternatural: Health and Healing from the Medieval Garden (Boydell, 2008), The Ashgate Research Companion to Monsters and the Monstrous (Ashgate, 2012), and The Devil in Society in Premodern Europe (Centre for Reformation and Renaissance Studies, 2012) with Richard Raiswell (University of Prince Edward Island).

Dendle's The Zombie Movie Encyclopedia (McFarland, 2001) was the first exhaustive overview of the subject, evaluating over 200 movies from 16 countries over a 65-year period starting from the early 1930s. The follow-up volume, The Zombie Movie Encyclopedia, Volume 2: 2000–2010 (McFarland), was published in 2012.

== Selected publications ==
=== Monographs ===
- Demon Possession in Anglo-Saxon England. Medieval Institute Publications, Western Michigan University. 2014. ISBN 978-1-58044-169-8.
- The Zombie Movie Encyclopedia, Volume 2: 2000–2010. McFarland & Company. 2012. ISBN 978-0786461639.
- Satan Unbound: The Devil in Old English Narrative Literature. University of Toronto Press. 2001. ISBN 0-8020-4839-0.
- The Zombie Movie Encyclopedia. McFarland & Company. 2000. ISBN 0-7864-0859-6.

=== Edited Collections ===
- Richard Raiswell with Peter Dendle The Devil in Society in Premodern Europe. Centre for Reformation and Renaissance Studies. 2012.
- Asa Simon Mittman and Peter Dendle, The Ashgate Research Companion to Monsters and the Monstrous. Ashgate. 2012. ISBN 978-1409407546.
- Peter Dendle and Alain Touwaide (eds.). Health and Healing from the Medieval Garden. Boydell & Brewer. 2008. ISBN 978-1-84383-363-5.
