= Lescarbot Award =

Canadian art award

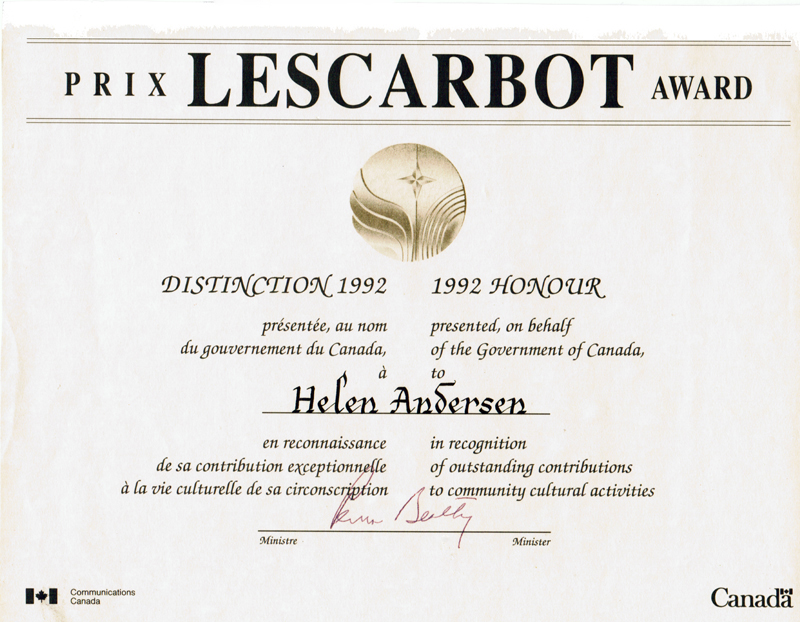
- Example of the Lescarbot Award
- Description: Recognition for volunteers and contributors to the arts community
- Country: Canada
- Presented by: Department of Canadian Heritage (Federal Government)

The Lescarbot Award is awarded by the federal government of Canada to people who have contributed the most to their arts community. The first recipient of the award was Father Fernand Lindsay, founder of the international de Lanaudière.

== Recipients ==
Recipients of this award include:

- Judith Budovitch, Fredericton, 1991
- John Cutruzzola, Brampton
- Garry Davies, Peace, 1991
- Lorenzo Bellisconi, 1991
- Joan E. Harriss, Cape Breton
- Karl Illini, Bobcaygeon
- Trudi Le Caine, Ottawa
- Helen Andersen, Saanichton, British Columbia 1992
- Sharon and Clary Croft, Halifax, Nova Scotia, 1992
- Reid Parker, Saint John, 1992
- Fernand Lindsay, Trois-Pistoles, Quebec, 1992
- Dasharathal H. Shah, North York/Richmond Hill, 1992
- Mike Matovich, Airdrie, 1992
- E. Noël Spinelli, Montreal, 1993
- Joseph M. Tanenbaum, Toronto, 1993
- Charles William John Eliot, Charlottetown, 1993
- Clarence Melvin Cross, Chesterville, Ontario, 1993
