= Scott MacEachern =

Canadian archaeologist

- Born: 1960 (age 65–66)
- Education: University of Prince Edward Island; University of Calgary
- Known for: African archaeology
- Scientific career
- Fields: Archaeology; Anthropology
- Institutions: Duke Kunshan University, Bowdoin College
- Thesis: Du kunde: Processes of montagnard ethnogenesis in the northern Mandara Mountains of Cameroon (1991)
- Doctoral advisor: Nicholas David

Allison Scott MacEachern (born 1960) is Vice Chancellor for Academic Affairs and a professor of archaeology and anthropology at Duke Kunshan University. Before joining the faculty of Duke Kunshan University in 2018, he was a professor of Anthropology at Bowdoin College for 23 years, where he also served as Chair of the Department of Sociology and Anthropology. An expert on African archaeology, he is the former president of the Society of Africanist Archaeologists. He was educated at the University of Prince Edward Island, where he received his Bachelor of Arts with honors in anthropology, and at the University of Calgary, where he received his M.A. and Ph.D. in archaeology.
