= Hugh Le Caine =

Canadian composer and physicist

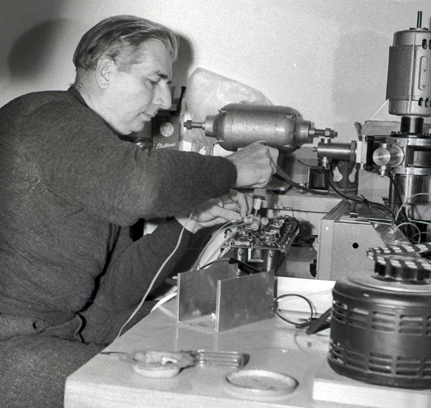
Hugh Le Caine in the Centre for Electronic Music in Israel, Jerusalem (1962)

Hugh Le Caine (May 27, 1914 – July 3, 1977) was a Canadian physicist, composer, and instrument builder.

Le Caine was brought up in Port Arthur (now Thunder Bay) in northwestern Ontario. At a young age, he began making musical instruments. In youth, he started imagining "beautiful sounds". He attended high school in Port Arthur at Port Arthur Collegiate Institute (P.A.C.I.). After completing his master of science degree from Queen's University in 1939, Le Caine was awarded a National Research Council of Canada (NRC) fellowship to continue his work on atomic physics measuring devices at Queen's. He worked with the NRC in Ottawa from 1940 to 1974. During World War II, he assisted in the development of the first radar systems. On an NRC grant he studied nuclear physics from 1948 to 1952 in England. Le Caine wanted to devise new ways to produce those "beautiful sounds", so he established his own electronic music studio where he began to build new electronic instruments after World War II.

== Works ==
At home, he pursued a lifelong interest in electronic music and sound generation. In 1937, Le Caine designed an electronic free reed organ, and in the mid-1940s, he built the Electronic Sackbut, now recognised to be one of the first synthesizers. After the success of public demonstrations of his instruments, he was permitted to move his musical activities to the NRC and to work on them full-time in 1954, where he gained funding in order to open ELMUS, the Canadian Electronic Music Laboratory. Over the next twenty years, he built over twenty-two different new instruments and helped Canadian universities establish their own studios in the new electronic music medium.

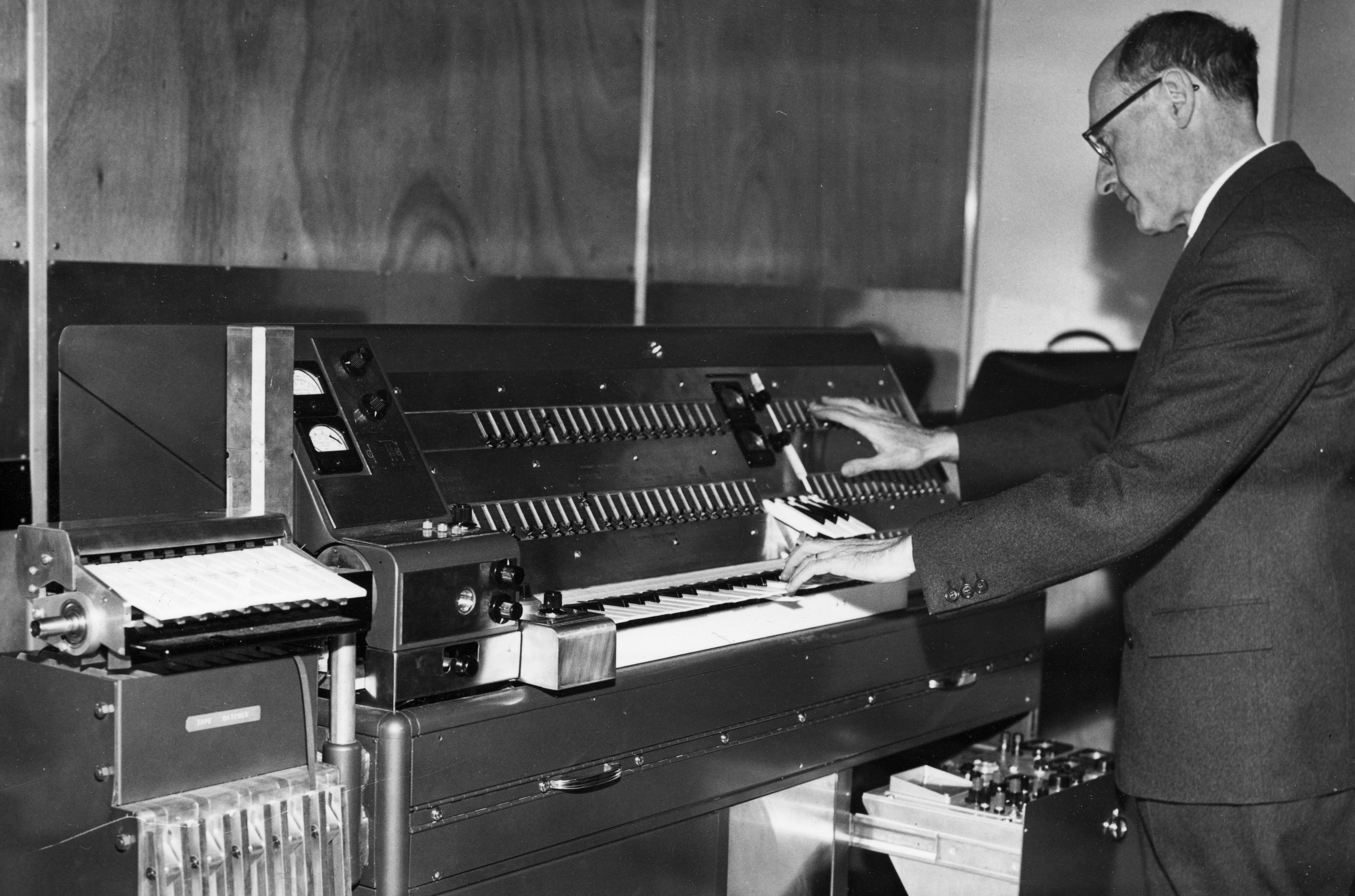
Israeli composer Josef Tal at the Electronic Music Studio in Jerusalem (c. 1965) with Hugh Le Caine's Creative Tape Recorder (a sound synthesizer) aka "Multi-track"

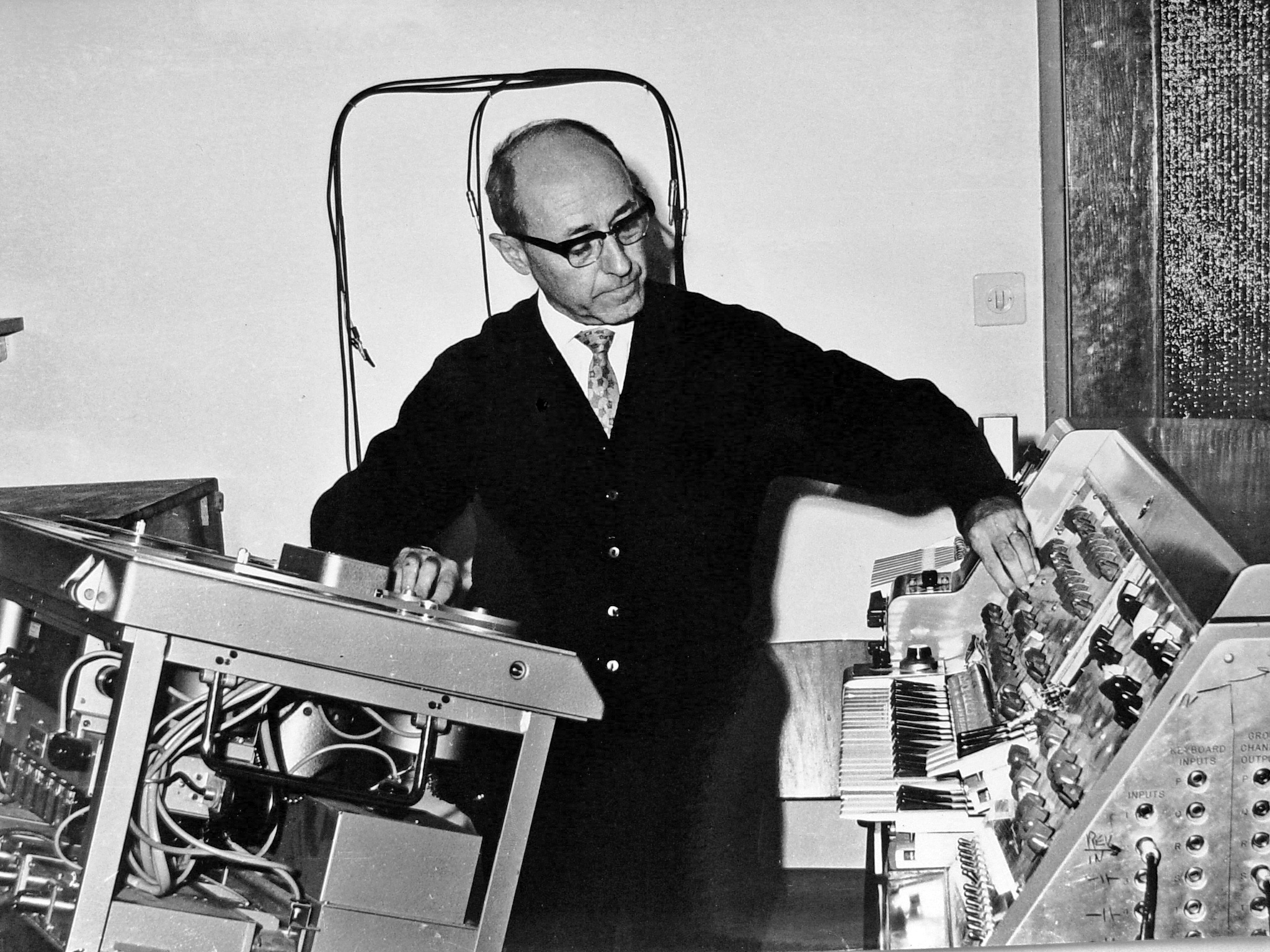
Josef Tal with Hugh Le Caine's Creative Tape Recorder (after modification)

One of Le Caine's most notable inventions was the Special Purpose Tape Recorder (later renamed the "Multi-track."). Experiments with his recorder led to the composition of Dripsody in 1955. The subtitle of the piece is "An Étude for Variable Speed Recorder"; Le Caine is acknowledging the musical past with his use of the word étude. French for "study", it allows an instrument to explore or study a specific technical difficulty.

Between 1955 and his retirement from the NRC in 1973, Le Caine produced at least fifteen electroacoustic compositions in order to demonstrate the capabilities of his new devices. He also created a score of new devices and also presented his ideas and inventions to learned bodies and the general public. But while Le Caine did get excellent responses from both the learned bodies and the public, he did not get a satisfactory response from industry. Fortunately, a few people did eventually come into Le Caine's life to make him feel his efforts were of some value. One of these people was Israeli composer Josef Tal. In the summer of 1958, Tal had travelled to Ottawa under a UNESCO grant to visit major electronic music studios. Tal grew very excited about the instruments that Le Caine had built, but he did not realize what this meant to Le Caine until the following day when Le Caine, Tal, and several technicians were having lunch in a small restaurant. Tal noticed that not only had Le Caine been rather silent on this day, but on close inspection at the table, Le Caine had tears running down his cheeks and falling silently into his soup. When an opportunity arose, Tal delicately asked one of the technicians about this and was told that Le Caine had felt no composer in Canada had a use for his instruments and that Tal was the first composer who had shown any interest in his work.

In 1962 Le Caine arrived in Jerusalem to install his Creative Tape Recorder in the Centre for Electronic Music in Israel, established by Josef Tal. Le Caine also collaborated in the development of pioneering electronic music studios at the University of Toronto in 1959 and at McGill University in 1964.

=== Dripsody ===
Although his compositional output was small, Le Caine is remembered as a pioneer of musique concrète. His best known work is Dripsody (1955), a piece of musique concrète based on the sound of a single drop of water that over the course of the piece is permuted and contorted into a variety of sounds. Le Caine used a metal wastebasket filled with two inches of water, held an eyedropper ten inches above the wastebasket, and tape-recorded the water drops for thirty minutes. After reviewing the resulting recording, Le Caine selected one of the water drops and spliced it onto a short tape loop. This allowed the water drop to repeat like a traditional ostinato figure.

Le Caine wrote down rhythmic figures that simulated the sound of water drops including how loud to make each figure, noting a corresponding decibel number. He correlated the time values of the rhythms with different lengths of tape. Coming back to the tape recorder, Le Caine used the new tool to perform five kinds of operations or manipulations, all with a different effect.

The first operation, which was the changing of tape speed, was his primary technique. The faster the tape is played, the higher the pitch and vice versa. Tape speed is measured by ips or inches per second. So slowing a recording by half (7-1/2-ips), lowers all pitches by an octave. Le Caine created a three-octave keyboard that allows him to choose different speeds. All the different pitches during Dripsody were achieved by changing the tape speed. He, sometime in the process of creating the keyboard, assembled the pitches into a pentatonic (five note) scale pattern.

The second operation's objective was to play the recorded sound backwards, reversing the direction of the tape. Acoustically, the effect is to change the amplitude envelope. What we normally experience with amplitude is, for example, pressing a key on a piano, a loud sound emerges then slowly fades away; the second operation's objective is the opposite.

Le Caine also used four different tape loops to produce ostinato patterns heard in Dripsody. Three different speeds creates twelve different loops not needing to add additional splices. However, he did use splices as his fourth operation. Splicing different pitches resulted from different playback speeds of initial drop creates a twelve-note arpeggio. Only twenty-five splices were used to compose the piece, which made him very proud, and the multi-track recorder controlled all other variations.

The fifth operation was the use of tape delay. To Le Caine, it was an echo effect he produced by playing a sound on the recorder while re-recording the sound at the same time. The new recording had a lower amplitude and created an echo-like sound.

Le Caine spent one night manipulating his initial "drop" sound. The overall work could be considered programmatic, it is similar to the ebb and flow of a rain shower. There are various versions since he added a stereo mixing system to the multi-track. Dripsody is one of the most frequently played examples of musique concrète, but Le Caine remained modest. Once when asked why he chose the name Dripsody he replied, "Because it was written by a drip."

== Life ==
He was married to Trudi Le Caine, born Gertrude Janowski, a music educator.

Le Caine died in 1977 from injuries in a motorcycle accident at age sixty-three.
