= Alain Touwaide =

Belgian American historian

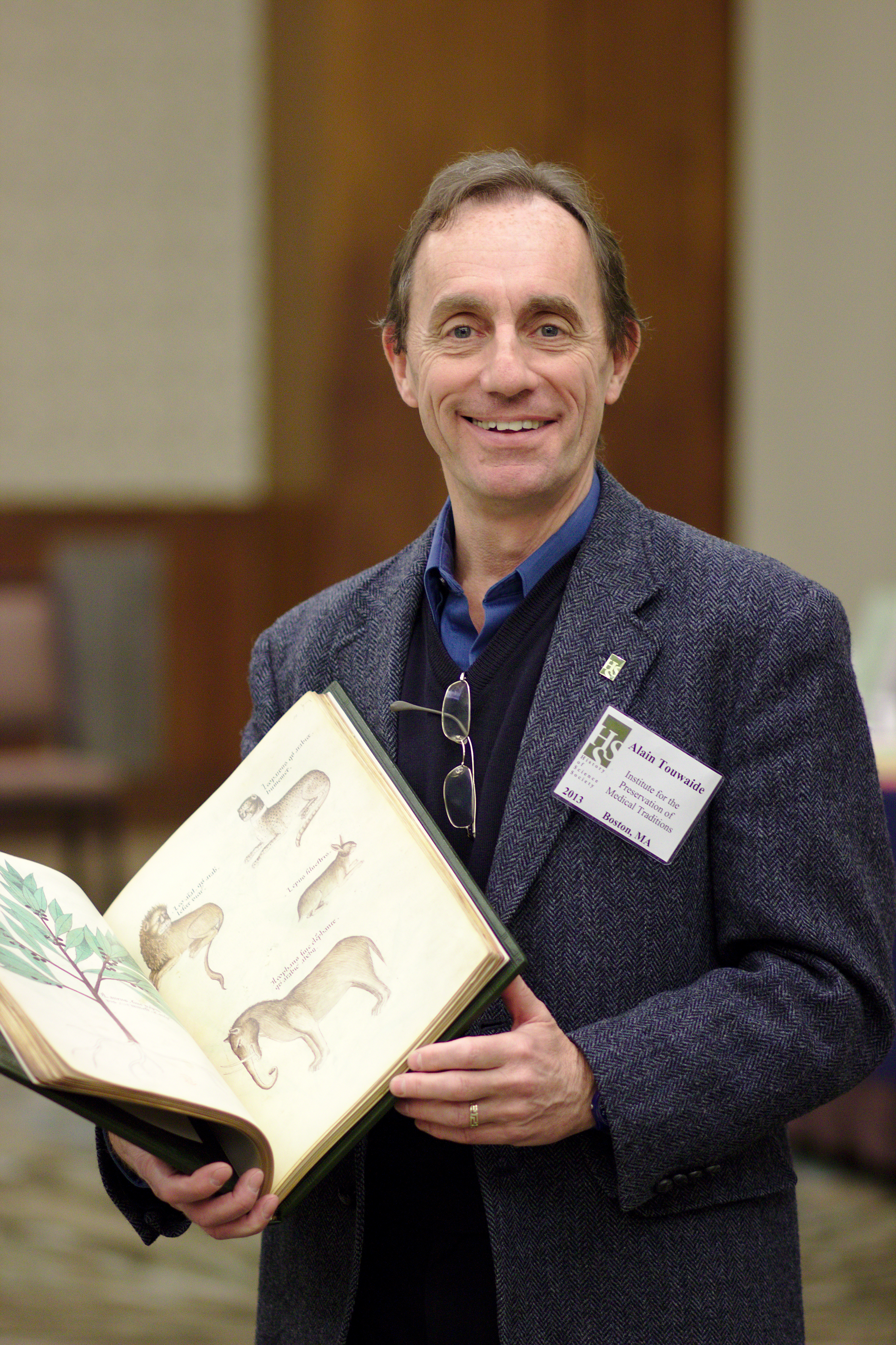
Alain Touwaide in 2013

Alain Touwaide (born 19 September 1953 in Brussels-Berchem Sainte Agathe) is a US historian of medicine and sciences of Belgian origin. He taught history of Greek medicine and its tradition, Food history and other topics in the Medical Humanities at the University of California Los Angeles (UCLA), during the academic years 2015-2016 (fall and winter terms), 2016-2017 (winter and spring terms), 2017-2018 (spring term), 2018-2019 (winter term).

His education includes first degrees in classics (1975) as well as oriental philology and history (1977) and a PhD in classics (1981), all earned at the University of Louvain. He received his habilitation à diriger des recherches at the University of Toulouse (1997). He won numerous prizes and grants, among others of the Earth Watch Institute, and has taught at several universities in Spain, Italy, France and Belgium. Touwaide is proficient in several languages. His main research area is medicinal plants of Antiquity, his approach being transdisciplinary, that is, not only philological and historical, but also botanical and medical, ethnological and anthropological, constituting ethnobotany and ethnopharmacology. In 2005, Touwaide received a grant of the National Institutes of Health for a four-year research project “Medicinal plants of Antiquity: A Computerized Database”. Ancient Greek therapeutical texts were digitized, indexed and analyzed both in the original and in translation.

From 2007 to 2008 he was president of the Washington Academy of Sciences. He has been elected as a Fellow of the International Academy for the History of Pharmacy (1991), the Linnean Society (1997), the Washington Academy of Sciences (2003), the American Association for the Advancement of Science (2009), and the Royal Society of Medicine, UK (2010). He is the co-founder and current scientific director of the Institute for the Preservation of Medical Traditions and has been affiliated with the Smithsonian Institution from 2002 through 2016, where he was a historian of science in the botany department of the National Museum of Natural History. In September 2019, he was awarded the Kremers Award from the American Institute of the History of Pharmacy. He is one of the founders, and the principal investigator of the UNESCO Chair Plantae Medicinales Mediterraneae-Plants for Health in the Mediterranean Traditions, which was established at the University of Salerno, Italy, in 2020. He is a member of the Pan-American Academy of History of Medicine and serves on its board of directors as Honorary Vice President for the North American section.

== Selected publications ==
- Alain Touwaide. Greek Medical Manuscripts - Diels' Catalogues, 5 volumes, De Gruyter, 2020.
- Alain Touwaide. A Census of Greek Medical Manuscripts. From Byzantium to the Renaissance. Routledge, 2016.
- Tractatus de herbis. Sloane MS 4016. Volume of study accompanying the facsimile reproduction of manuscript London, British Library, Sloane 4016. Barcelona: M. Moleiro Editor, 2013.
- Peter Dendle & Alain Touwaide & (eds.). Health and Healing from the Medieval Garden. Proceedings of the 15th Annual Medieval Studies Conference at The Pennsylvania State University. Boydell & Brewer, 2008.
- Jean A. Givens, Karen M. Reeds & Alain Touwaide (eds). Visualizing Medieval Medicine and Natural History, 1200-1500 (AVISTA Studies in the History of Medieval Technology, Science and Art, volume 5). Ashgate, 2006.
- Gianni Aliotta, Daniele Piomelli, Antonino Pollio & Alain Touwaide. Le piante medicinali del “Corpus Hippocraticum (Hippocratica Civitas 5). Guerini Associati, 2003.
