= ELMUS =

National Research Council of Canada electronic music laboratory (1954–1974)

Electronic Music Laboratory ELMUS
- Established: 1954
- Director: Hugh Le Caine (1954-1974)
- Location: Ottawa, Ontario, Canada

ELMUS was the Electronic Music Laboratory of the National Research Council of Canada in Ottawa, directed by physicist and instrument designer Hugh Le Caine. Created in 1954 within NRC’s Radio and Electrical Engineering Division, the lab designed and built studio equipment and electronic musical instruments used in Canada’s earliest university studios. Operations continued until Le Caine’s retirement in 1974.

== History ==
Following demonstrations of Le Caine’s early instruments, NRC set up a dedicated electronic music research facility in 1954. The unit was placed under the Radio and Electrical Engineering Division and pursued instrument design with technical and commercial potential. It operated from 1954 until 1974.

From the mid-1950s the lab supported the formation of Canadian university studios. Canada’s first electronic music studio opened at the University of Toronto in 1959 with Le Caine as technical advisor. McGill University followed in 1964 with equipment largely supplied from ELMUS, and Queen’s University developed facilities with ELMUS-built devices later transferred to Kingston.

ELMUS instruments and systems were presented publicly, including at Expo 67 in Montréal, where an expanded Serial Sound Structure Generator was shown. NRC notes that Le Caine’s handcrafted technologies helped make Canada’s earliest studios possible and influenced commercial manufacturers such as Baldwin and Moog.

== Instruments and systems ==
Work at ELMUS produced a suite of devices for composition and studio practice. Selected examples include:

- Electronic Sackbut prototype developed by Le Caine prior to ELMUS and brought into NRC; its success prompted establishment of the lab in 1954.
- Special Purpose Tape Recorder (also called the Multi-track), a studio-oriented machine enabling alteration and recombination of prerecorded sounds; designed and built at ELMUS in Ottawa.
- Serial Sound Structure Generator (SSSG), a programmable analog sequencer applying serial logic to pitch, duration, timbre and volume; multiple versions were made and one was later exhibited at Expo 67.
- Sonde (1968), an additive synthesis instrument capable of generating dense sine-tone clusters; built at ELMUS, with examples later used at Queen’s University.

The national museum collection at Ingenium cites 22 instruments and related artifacts by Le Caine from the period 1945-1974, many originating in the ELMUS lab.

== Collaboration with universities ==
Direct support from ELMUS underpinned early Canadian electroacoustic training. The University of Toronto Electronic Music Studio opened in 1959 with Le Caine as technical advisor, identified contemporaneously as the first such studio in Canada and the second on the continent. McGill University’s studio opened in 1964 with apparatuses donated from ELMUS, and Queen’s University later incorporated ELMUS devices into its teaching and research.

== Legacy ==
NRC’s historical overview highlights the lab’s role in equipping early Canadian studios and influencing later commercial instrument makers. Scholarly and curatorial sources document a body of 22 instruments associated with Le Caine’s work, preserved today in Canadian museum collections. ELMUS is widely cited in Canadian electroacoustic histories for catalyzing university-level studios and training in the 1950s and 1960s.

== See also ==
- Hugh Le Caine
- McGill University
- Queen's University at Kingston
