= Dave Nutbrown =

Canadian basketball coach

Dave Nutbrown is a Canadian basketball coach.

Dave Nutbrown grew up in Quebec, and attended the University of New Brunswick where he played varsity basketball for the Red Raiders. In 1966-67 Nutbrown led UNB to a first place record of 10-2 and their first and only Maritime intercollegiate championship, scoring 247 points for a 20.6 per game average which placed him fifth in the conference. In 1968-69, he set the school's single-game scoring mark (44 points), since tied by Doug Thompson in 2005–2006. Following his university career Nutbrown received a tryout with the New York Knicks of the National Basketball Association. He returned Canada and coached St. Stephen's high school boys' basketball team in the early 1970s before becoming head coach of the UPEI Panthers of the University of Prince Edward Island in the early 1980s.

== Acadia University ==
After some success as coach at UPEI, Nutbrown was hired as Men's Basketball coach at Acadia University in Wolfville, Nova Scotia. At Acadia, Nutbrown was a six-time conference Coach of the Year and received the Stewart W. Aberdeen Memorial Trophy as CIAU men's basketball coach of the year in 1987-88. That year Nutbrown led Acadia to the CIAU final with a starting lineup of five native Nova Scotia players - Peter Morris, Kevin Veinot, Grant MacDonald, Charles Ikejiani and Tyrone Carvery. 2003-2004 was Nutbrown's final season as Acadia coach - since that time the University has had four other men's basketball coaches.

== 1993 World University Games ==
Nutbrown also coached extensively with the Canadian National Team program alongside coaches such as Ken Shields and John Dore. He was the head coach for Canada at the XVII World University Games (or 1993 Summer Universiade), leading Canada to a 5-2 record and a berth in the tournament final against the dominant host country United States. In that year's tournament, the United States roster featured future NBA players including Damon Stoudamire, Michael Finley, Ed O'Bannon, Sharone Wright, Eric Piatkowski, and Carlos Rogers, averaged 40 more points than its opponents and had six players averaging in double figures. The United States entered the final with a cumulative 18-game winning streak and overall record of 90-6 in the event.

The USA's perfect record and aspirations for a gold medal nearly came to an end as an inspired Canadian team forced the Americans to mount a second-half comeback before the U.S. earned a 95-90 win. Controlling the entire first half, Canada led by 17 points, 41-24, with 3:48 to go in the first half, however, the U.S. managed to cut the Canadian's lead to 12, 52-40, by halftime. Trailing 59-50 with 16:43 to play, the U.S., behind five points from captain Damon Stoudamire, went on a 16-0 scoring run to regain the lead, 66-59 with 12:50 to play. The U.S. went on to lead by as many as 10 points, but Canada rallied to cut the lead to one 87-86 with 2:48 to play. However, an Ed O'Bannon basket was followed by a jumper from Finley and the U.S. was back in front by five, 91-86. Canada cut the lead to three, 91-88 with 1:48 to play, but the USA's Stoudamire countered with a basket with 1:21 left to push the U.S. lead back to five and the USA managed to hold off the Canadians from there for the 95-90 victory and the gold medal. Jeff Foreman led Canada with 30 points.

== Notable Media Appearances ==
Nutbrown was featured on the CBC television program Sports Journal with host Tom Harrington on June 17, 2001.

Nutbrown was featured in the They Said It section of Sports Illustrated on February 10, 1997 with the following entry:

Dave Nutbrown
Men's basketball coach at Acadia University in Wolfville, Nova Scotia, after his team rallied from an 18-point halftime deficit against Saint Mary's of nearby Halifax, only to lose 86-81 in overtime: "Moral victories are for losers"

== Dalhousie University ==
Nutbrown joined the Dalhousie University men's basketball team as an assistant coach for the 2008–2009 season. The Tigers won the Atlantic University Sport conference tournament in his first season, becoming conference champions for just the second time ever, and the first since 1996. The Tigers won the AUS championship again during the 2010–2011 season.
