= UPEI Panthers =

Athletic teams of the University of Prince Edward Island in Charlottetown

- University: University of Prince Edward Island
- Nickname: Panthers
- Association: U Sports
- Conference: Atlantic University Sport
- Athletic director: Ron Annear
- Location: Charlottetown, Prince Edward Island
- Varsity teams: 12 (5 men's, 7 women's)
- Arena: MacLauchlan Arena
- Stadium: UPEI Alumni Canada Games Place
- Other venues: Chi Wan Young Sport Centre
- Colours: Green and black
- Mascot: Pride the Panther
- Website: www.gopanthersgo.ca
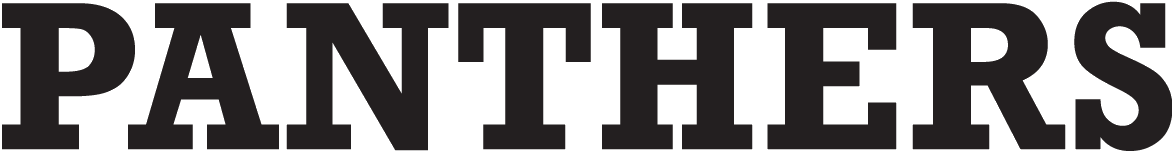

The UPEI Panthers are the men's and women's athletic teams that represent the University of Prince Edward Island in Charlottetown, Prince Edward Island, Canada. The UPEI Panthers have teams playing in the Atlantic University Sport (AUS) conference of the U Sports, including men's and women's ice hockey, soccer, basketball, cross country running, curling as well as women's rugby. The women's field hockey team competes in an Atlantic league where the winner is then allowed to compete in the U Sports playoffs. UPEI also offers a club-level men's rugby team.

== Varsity sports ==
| Men's sports | Women's sports |
|---|---|
| Basketball | Basketball |
| Cross country | Cross country |
| Ice hockey | Field hockey |
| Soccer | Ice hockey |
| Track and field | Rugby |
| | Soccer |
| | Track and field |

=== Men's Basketball ===
The Panthers have the fifth-most Atlantic University Sport (AUS) conference Championships (five) their most recent being the 2024-25 season. The AUS conference is a competitive Canadian league that has produced Canadian national champions, a Canadian Olympics player, several NBA draftees, and one NBA player.

==== Notable players ====
- Jim Fitzgerald - on the Saint Dunstan's University teams of 1967-68 and 1968–69 and then played on the first UPEI teams for two years. Graduated from Springfield, Massachusetts Cathedral High School and one post-high school year at Hargrave Military Academy in Virginia, USA. The 6'5" center averaged 32.5 points per game his first year and above 25 points per year over the next three years. He was UPEI Male Athlete of the Year in 1971.
- David "Hermie" MacNeill - on the Saint Dunstan's University basketball team in 1967–68. Following his first year, MacNeill joined the university's athletic staff as an athletic trainer. Through 2013 MacNeill spent every year involved in different positions in Prince Edward Island athletics and spent 12 years coaching the UPEI Women's Varsity Basketball Team. MacNeill earned many distinctions and honors as the UPEI Women's Coach with the highest distinction in taking the women's team to the U Sports championship game in 1989, winning the Silver Medal after losing to the undefeated University of Calgary team. He was five-time Atlantic University Sport (AUS) Coach of the Year.

=== Women's Basketball ===
The women's team have the fourth-most Atlantic Conference Championships (six), with their most recent for the 2019–20 season. The 2019–20 team also won the bronze medal at the 2020 U Sports Women's Basketball Championship. Jenna Mae Ellsworth would win the 2020 Nan Copp Award, recognizing U Sports Player of the Year. During the same month, Ellsworth was also named to the list of the Top 100 U Sports Women’s Basketball Players of the Century (2011–2020).

=== Field Hockey ===
Halfback Kathie McNally was featured in Sports Illustrated's Faces in the Crowd segment in the issue dated November 7, 1994. Following her final season with the program, McNally captured the James Bayer Award for her athleticism, leadership and sportsmanship. Earning a pair of second-team CIAU All-Canadian All-Star awards (1992–93 and 1993–94), she was inducted into the PEI Panthers Hall of Fame in 2006. In 1997-98, Tracy McGee captured the Gail Wilson Award, given to the U Sports Field Hockey Player of the Year. Moore would also win the 1998 Sport P.E.I. top senior female athlete award.

=== Men's ice hockey ===
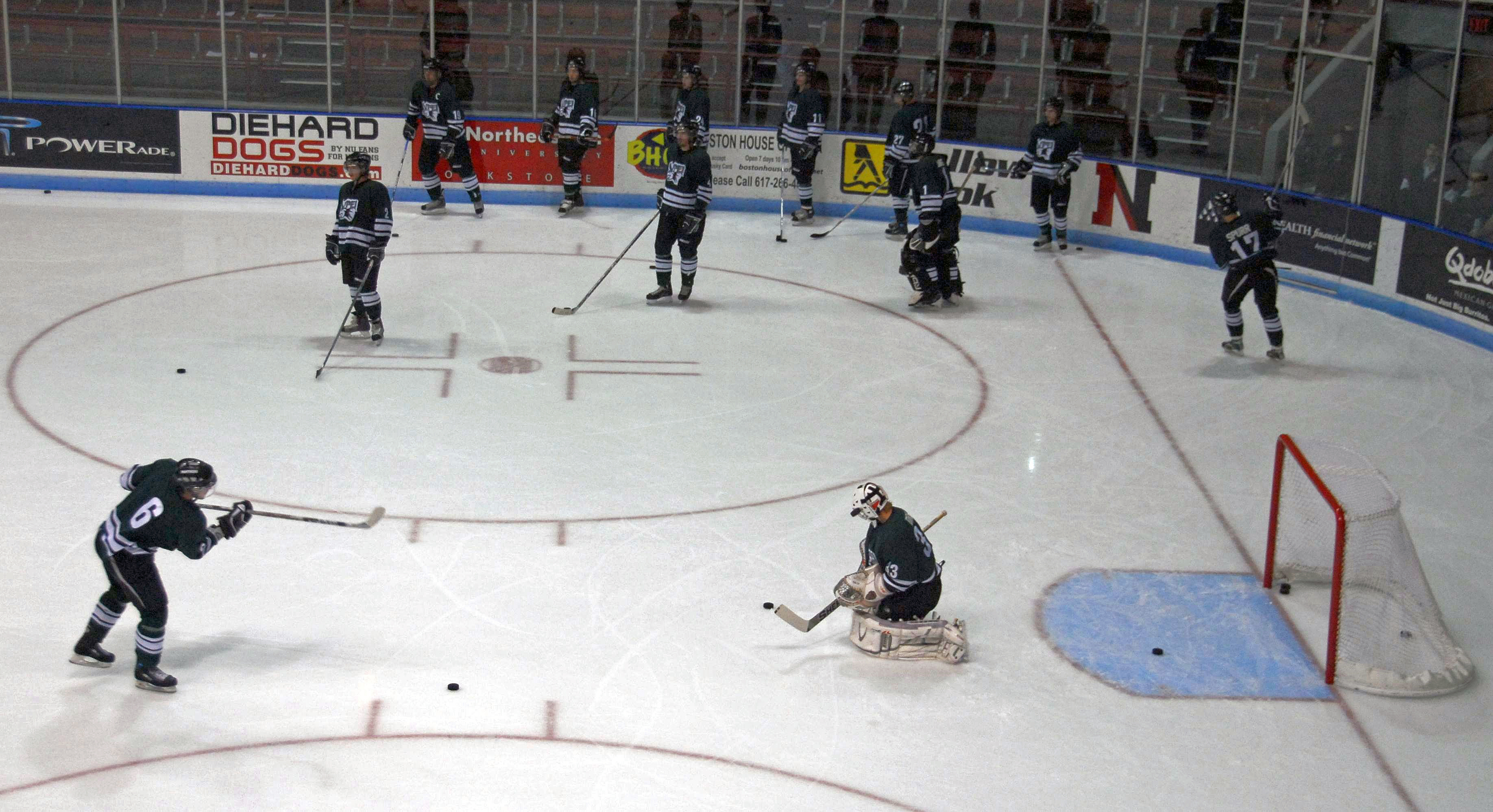
UPEI Panthers hockey

The Panthers are tied with the Mount Allison Mounties for the sixth-most Atlantic Conference Championships (six)^{[Note A]}, their last being the 1990–91 season. The Panthers have never won the U Sports University Cup with only one appearance in the final in 1965 as their previous incarnation; the St. Dunstan's Saints. UPEI was the host venue for the championship once in 1970.

Joel Ward of the NHL's San Jose Sharks played four seasons with the UPEI Panthers men's ice hockey team.

=== Women's ice hockey ===
The UPEI Panthers women's ice hockey team won their first Atlantic University Sports Conference Championship in the 2011-12 season. The program would also serve as the host team in consecutive years for the 2019 U Sports Women's Ice Hockey Championship and 2022 U Sports Women's Ice Hockey Championship (The school was originally awarded the 2020 tournament, but it was cancelled due to the COVID-19 pandemic in Canada).

Keirsten Visser would play for Canada in women's ice hockey at the 2015 Winter Universiade, capturing a silver medal. Goaltender Marie-Soleil Deschenes would win the 2016-17 UPEI Female Athlete of the Year Award. Another goaltender, Camille Scherger, would earn a place on the 2019-20 USports All-Canadian Second Team,

The 2020 U Sports women’s hockey championship, hosted by UPEI, was named the SCORE! Event of the Year by PEI Amateur Sport.

=== Women's Rugby ===
Since rugby became a fully sanctioned Atlantic University Sport in 2002, the Panthers have finished runner up three times (2004, 2005 and 2006) to the ever-dominant St. Francis Xavier X-Women.

=== Men's Soccer ===
The men's team has the sixth-most Atlantic Conference Championships (five), their last title being in 2002. The men have never reached the U Sports Men's Soccer Championship final. UPEI was the host venue for the championship in 2005 and 2014. UPEI Men's Soccer made history in 2014 as the first Panther soccer team to win a medal at the U Sports Men's Soccer Championship. The Panthers won bronze at home defeating the Canada West Champions, University of Saskatchewan Huskies in the quarter-finals, before defeating the Quebec Champions, UQAM Citadens, in the Bronze medal game.

=== Women's Soccer ===
In all five of her seasons (2001–02 to 2005–06), Amy Connolly was named to the AUS All-Star Team. As a rookie, she was named Team MVP and would captain the team to its first ever appearance at the CIS Nationals, as the women's team won the Atlantic Conference Championship in 2004. The following year, Connolly was recognized as the CIS Women's Soccer Player of the Year, complemented by the UPEI Female Athlete of the Year Award.

UPEI was the host venue for the 2010 U Sports women's soccer championship. During that year, Tessa Roche would capture her second consecutive AUS Most Valuable Player Award.

In 2017, Alanna Taylor was the first female soccer player inducted into the PEI Panthers Hall of Fame. The following year (2018), Connolly also gained induction.

== Awards and honours ==
- 2019–20 Atlantic University Sport Female Athlete of the Year: Jenna Mae Ellsworth - UPEI Basketball

=== Athletes of the Year ===
| Year | Female Athlete | Sport | Male Athlete | Sport | Ref. |
|---|---|---|---|---|---|
| 2011–12 | Janet Gamble | Swimming | Manock Lual | Basketball | |
| 2012–13 | Marina MacAulay | Field Hockey | Jimmie Mayaleh | Soccer | |
| 2014–15 | Amy Gough | Basketball | Tyler Scott; Cole MacMillan | Basketball; Soccer and Ice Hockey | |
| 2015–16 | Alysha Corrigan; Katelynn Donahoe | Rugby; Basketball | Tyler Scott; Cole MacMillan | Basketball; Soccer and Ice Hockey | |
| 2016–17 | Marie-Soleil Deschenes | Ice Hockey | Mark Ashlee | Soccer | |
| 2017–18 | Kiera Rigby; Bailey Smith; Alysha Corrigan | Basketball; Track and Field; Rugby | Ryan MacKinnon | Ice hockey | |
| 2018–19 | Bailey Smith | Track and Field | Kameron Kielly | Ice hockey | |
| 2019–20 | Jenna Mae Ellsworth | Basketball | Owen Headrick | Ice Hockey | |
| 2020–21 | Not awarded due to the COVID-19 pandemic. | | | | |
| 2021–22 | Jolena Gillard | | | | |

== Notes ==
^{A} Two of the Panthers' six conference championships were won by their previous incarnation; the St. Dunstan's Saints.
