= Elizabeth Rollins Epperly =

Canadian academic

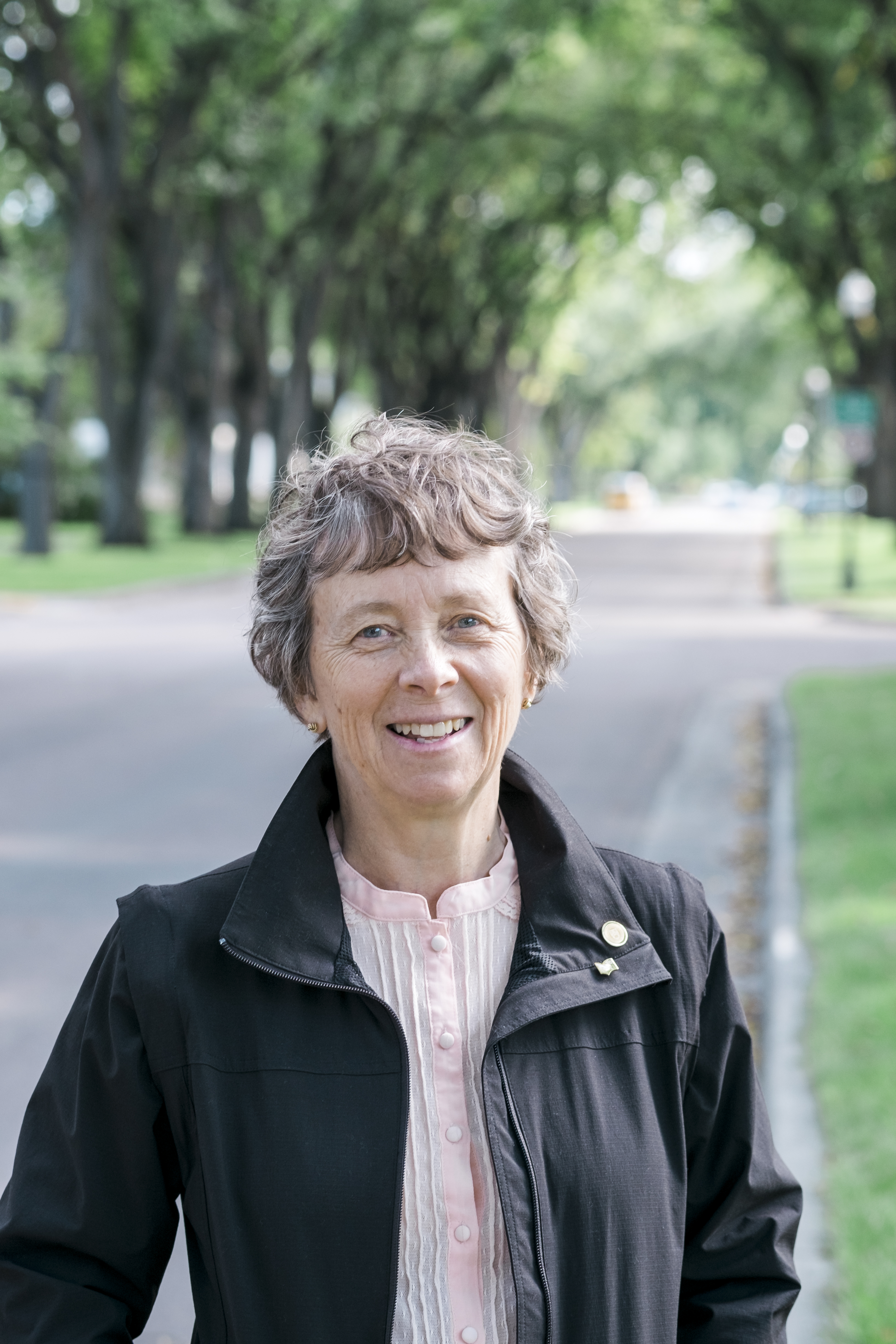
Elizabeth Rollins Epperly, 2016

Elizabeth Rollins Epperly CM (born 1951, Virginia) is an American–Canadian Victorian scholar, author, curator, English professor (from 1976 to 2006), and former university president (1995–1998) of the University of Prince Edward Island (UPEI). Epperly taught at the University of Prince Edward Island for 22 years where she also served as founding chair of the L.M. Montgomery Institute and UPEI's fourth (and first female) president. The Epperly Plaza on the UPEI campus is dedicated in her name. Following her retirement she was made Professor Emerita by the university.

Epperly was the first student to ever register at the newly created University of Prince Edward Island in 1969. She moved to Canada from the United States because of her love for Lucy Maud Montgomery's writing. Epperly also authored many books and dozens of articles, and has curated several Montgomery exhibitions, including the L.M. Montgomery Virtual Exhibition Project, and This Anne Place: Anne of Green Gables as Idea, Book and Musical. She serves on the board of the Anne of Green Gables Licensing Authority and the International Advisory Board of the LMMI.

== Education ==
Following her graduation with a BA from UPEI in 1973 Epperly studied for an MA at Dalhousie University in 1974 and completed her PhD in English Literature at Birkbeck College, University of London in 1978.

== Selected publications ==
- The Fragrance of Sweet-Grass: L.M. Montgomery's Heroine's and the Pursuit of Romance, 2014
- Imagining Anne: The Island Scrapbooks of L.M. Montgomery, 2008
- Through Lovers Lane: L.M. Montgomery's Photography and Visual Imagination, 2007
- L.M. Montgomery and Canadian Culture, Ed. by Irene Gammel and Elizabeth R. Epperly, University of Toronto Press, 1999
- My Dear Mr. M.: Letters to G.B. MacMillan from L.M. Montgomery. 1980. Ed. by Francis W.P. Bolger and Elizabeth R. Epperly. Oxford University Press, 1992.
- The More We Get Together. Ed. by Houston Stewart, Beth Percival, Elizabeth R. Epperly, Canadian Research Institute for the Advancement of Women, Gynergy Press, 1992.
- Patterns of Repetition in Trollope. Catholic University of America Press, 1989.
- Anthony Trollope's Notes on the Old Drama. University of Victoria: ELS Monograph Series, 1988.
