= Atlantic Veterinary College =

Public veterinary school at University of Prince Edward Island, Canada

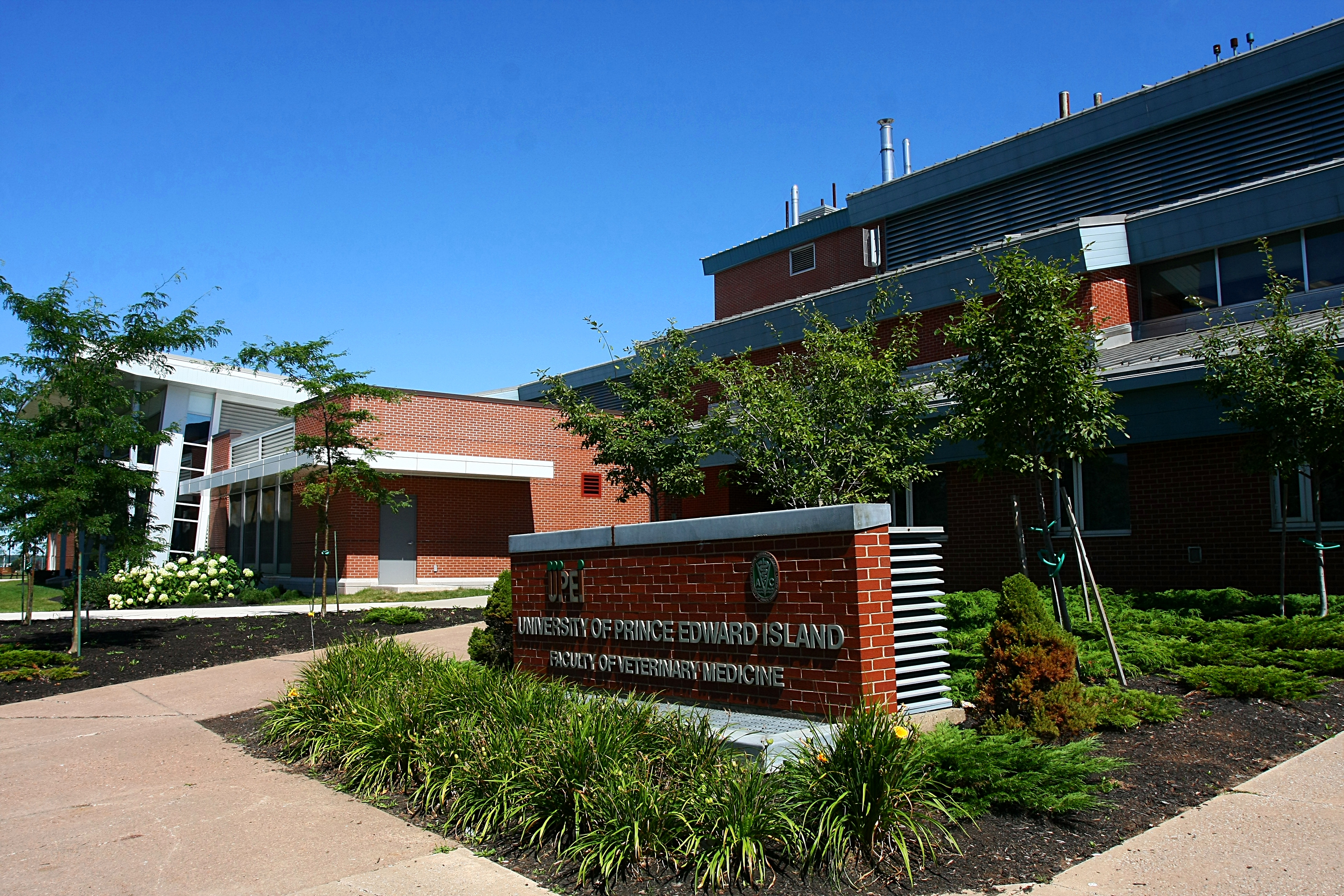
- Type: Public veterinary school
- Established: 1986; 40 years ago
- Affiliations: University of Prince Edward Island
- Dean: Dominique Griffon, Dean (Present)
- Faculty: Faculty of Veterinary Medicine
- Students: 68 DVM students per year
- Location: 550 University Avenue; Charlottetown, Prince Edward Island; C1A 4P3, Charlottetown, Canada; 46.2581°N 63.1409°W
- Colours: Green
- Website: upei.ca/avc

The Atlantic Veterinary College (AVC) is a veterinary school in the Faculty of Veterinary Medicine at University of Prince Edward Island, in Charlottetown, Prince Edward Island, Canada.

== History ==
AVC accepted its first class in 1986 at the University of Prince Edward Island. It is the only veterinary school in Atlantic Canada and only one of five in Canada educating Doctor of Veterinary Medicine.

== Academics ==
The DVM program in AVC is "fully accredited by the Canadian Veterinary Medical Association and the American Veterinary Medical Association, and it is recognized by the Royal College of Veterinary Surgeons in the United Kingdom."

AVC's Doctor of Veterinary Medicine is a four-year professional degree program. Each year AVC accepts 68 students into its DVM program. Fifty-one of AVC's annual seats are reserved for residents of Atlantic Canada (New Brunswick has 13 seats, Nova Scotia has 24 seats, Prince Edward Island has 11 seats, and Newfoundland and Labrador has 3 seats). The remaining seats available are for international students.

In addition to a Doctor of Veterinary Medicine (DVM) degree program, AVC offers Master of Science (MSc), Master of Veterinary Science (MVSc) and Doctoral (PhD) programs within the Faculty of Veterinary Medicine.

Some of the academic areas of expertise at the Atlantic Veterinary College include the Centre for Veterinary Epidemiological Research, the Centre for Aquatic Health Sciences, and the Sir James Dunn Animal Welfare Centre.

== Notable alumni ==
- Michelle Oakley, star of Dr. Oakley, Yukon Vet attended AVC.

== See also ==
- University of Prince Edward Island
