= University of Prince Edward Island =

Public university in Prince Edward Island, Canada

- Université de l'Île-du-Prince-Édouard
- Former names: Prince of Wales College (1860); Saint Dunstan's University (1855)
- Motto: Fides, Scientia, Beneficium (Latin)
- Motto in English: Faith, Knowledge, Service
- Type: Public
- Established: 1969; 57 years ago
- Endowment: $40 million (2019)
- Chancellor: Diane Griffin
- President: Wendy Rodgers
- Faculty: 246 permanent and 28 term faculty
- Students: 5,192 (Fall 2026)
- Undergraduates: 4,641
- Postgraduates: 551
- Location: 550 University Avenue; Charlottetown, Prince Edward Island; C1A 4P3; 46.259°N 63.138°W
- Campus: Mixed rural/urban
Colours
Rust, Green and Gold
- Nickname: UPEI Panthers
- Sporting affiliations: ACU; U Sports; AUCC; AUS; CBIE
- Mascot: Pride the Panther
- Website: www.upei.ca

The University of Prince Edward Island (UPEI) is a public university in Charlottetown, Prince Edward Island, Canada, and the only university in the province. Founded in 1969, the enabling legislation is the University Act, R.S.P.E.I 2000.

== History ==
The university traces its roots back to 1804, when Lt. Governor Edmund Fanning and the Legislative Council of Prince Edward Island called for the establishment of Kent College. By 1820, the first Kent College building, known as "the National School", or James Breading's School, was erected. It was later succeeded by Central Academy, which received a Royal Charter in 1834.

The Colleges were renamed for the Prince of Wales in honour of the future King Edward VII in 1860. The University of Prince Edward Island also traces its roots back to its two earlier predecessor organizations, St. Dunstan's University and Prince of Wales College, founded in 1855 and 1860 respectively. The two institutions were merged in 1969 by the government of Alex Campbell as part of a campaign to integrate the Island's Roman Catholic and Protestant communities, which had previously maintained the two separate institutions of higher learning. Holland College was later created to fill the void left by the merger of Prince of Wales College into the university. The University of Prince Edward Island is a non-denominational university established in 1969 by the amalgamation of Prince of Wales College (PWC) founded in 1834, and St. Dunstan's University (SDU) founded in 1855. The first student to enrol was Elizabeth Rollins Epperly, who would later become the university president. Its predecessor institutions ceased to operate although St. Dunstan's still retains its charter and the lands that were home to Prince of Wales became the campus for Holland College. UPEI is located on the former St. Dunstan's campus.

During the COVID-19 pandemic, UPEI received a $500,000 grant from the Public Health Agency of Canada's Immunization Partnership Fund to develop and implement the Island Vaccine Education Program, intended to increase uptake of COVID-19 vaccines among vulnerable families.

== Legacy ==
On 8 May 2004 Canada Post issued 'University of Prince Edward Island, 1804-2004' as part of the Canadian Universities series. The stamp was based on a design by Denis L'Allier and on a photograph by Guy Lavigueur. The 49¢ stamps are perforated 13.5 and were printed by Canadian Bank Note Company, Limited.

== Campus ==
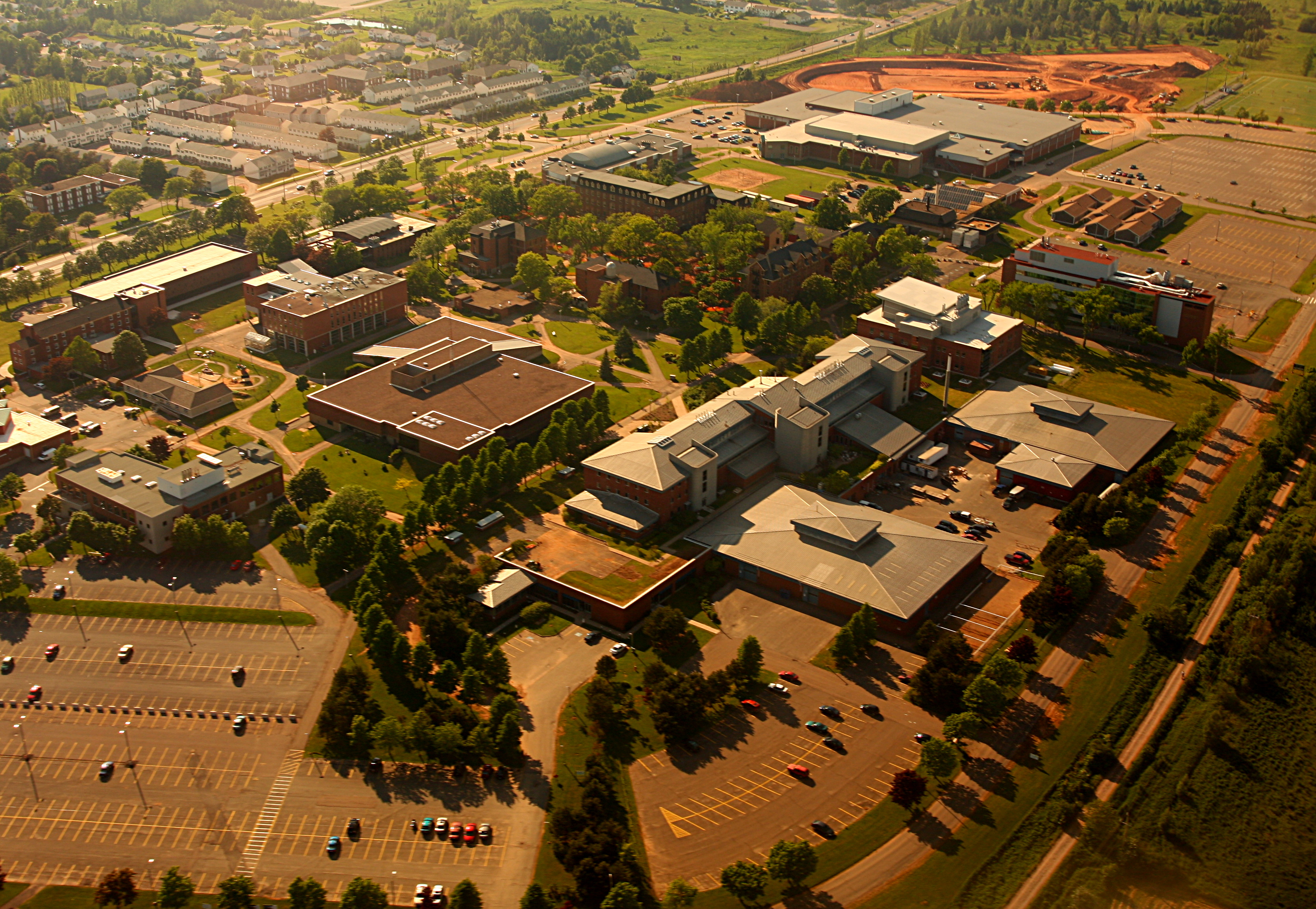
An aerial view of the UPEI campus in 2008

UPEI's campus, located at the corner of Belvedere and University Avenues in Charlottetown, Prince Edward Island's capital city, is built on 134 acres (54 hectares) of land. The Confederation Trail runs alongside its eastern boundary.

Original SDU buildings in the central quadrangle have been renovated to retain integrity of their exterior aesthetic design while meeting modern standards. Main Building, built in 1854, and Dalton Hall, built between 1917 and 1919, are on the registry of Historic Places of Canada.

The War Memorial Hall (more generally known as Memorial Hall) is a landmark building on the campus of UPEI. Built as a men's residence building in 1946, Memorial Hall honours alumni who had enlisted and died in the First World War, and in the Second World War.

Over the past three decades, UPEI has experienced significant growth with many new buildings integrated into the campus, including Central Utility Building (1973), Duffy Science Centre (1967), Blanchard Hall (1973), Bernardine Hall (1968), Robertson Library (1975), Atlantic Veterinary College (1986), Chi-Wan Young Sports Centre (1990), Wanda Wyatt Dining Hall (1990), Food Technology Centre, K.C. Irving Chemistry Centre (1997), W.A. Murphy Student Centre (2002), MacLauchlan Arena (2004), Bill and Denise Andrew Hall residence facility (2006), expansions to the Atlantic Veterinary College (2007 and 2009), Regis and Joan Duffy Research Centre (2007), a research and development laboratory which is home to the National Research Council of Canada, Agriculture and Agri-Food Canada, and other partners, and Don and Marion McDougall Hall (2008). The most recent addition is the Health Sciences Building, home to the School of Nursing and Applied Human Sciences programs.

In October 2004, the UPEI administration undertook an official campus plan to improve the aesthetics of modern buildings constructed since the amalgamation which do not enhance the original SDU design, and to take overall campus aesthetics into account for future developments on and adjacent to the campus.

== Organization ==
The current president and vice-chancellor is Dr. Wendy Rodgers, who began her appointment on June 1, 2024. The current chancellor is the Honourable Diane Griffin, who was installed on April 5, 2024.

== Academics ==
UPEI's seven faculties (arts, business, education, nursing, science, sustainable design engineering and veterinary medicine) and two schools (Mathematical & Computational Sciences and Climate Change & Adaptation) offer a wide range of programs and degrees to undergraduate, graduate and doctoral students. Co-op programs have been established in Business Administration, Computer Science, Physics, and Dietetics. The University is presently developing a Faculty of Medicine, in association with the Memorial University of Newfoundland.

Master's and Doctoral degree programs were first introduced through the Atlantic Veterinary College and, beginning in 1999, a Master of Science degree was offered through the Faculty of Science. In that same year the first students were admitted to the university's new Master of Education program. As of 2010, in addition to the MEd graduate program, the Faculty of Education offered a PhD in Educational Studies. The university also now offers a Master of Arts in Island Studies. Recently the Faculty of Business Administration began offering an Executive Master of Business Administration degree. Since 1998, The Centre for Conflict Resolution Studies has been offering courses leading to a Certificate in Conflict Resolution Studies. The Master of Applied Health Services Research (MAHSR) program is coordinated by the Atlantic Research Training Centre (ARTC).

The Faculty of Education offers one-year (12 months) post-degree bachelor's degrees with specializations in international, adult, and indigenous education, French immersion and human resources development, a Master of Education (MEd) in leadership in learning, and a PhD in Educational Studies.

The Department of Applied Human Sciences has an accredited dietitian program. The university is accredited by a professional organization such as the Dietitians of Canada and the university's graduates may subsequently become registered dieticians.

The Faculty Development Office provides professional development courses applicable to many sectors and industries, including development programs for administrative assistants and new managers; collaboration, conflict, and communication training; and, financial management courses.

=== Rankings ===
University rankings

World rankings

Canadian rankings
- Maclean's Undergraduate: 7
- Maclean's Reputation: 37

In Maclean's 2023 Guide to Canadian Universities, UPEI was ranked eighth in the publication's category for "primarily undergraduate" Canadian universities. In 2025 UPEI improved to seventh.

== Research ==
UPEI manages over $17 million in annual research expenditures. The on-campus biosciences and health research facility is used by researchers from UPEI, National Research Council (Canada), and Agriculture and Agri-Foods Canada.

UPEI houses the L.M. Montgomery Institute, founded in 1993, which promotes scholarly inquiry into the life, works, culture, and influence of the Canadian writer, L.M. Montgomery. The collection consists of novels, manuscripts, texts, letters, photographs, sound recordings and other Montgomery artifacts and ephemera.

UPEI joined with Dalhousie University and Memorial University of Newfoundland to form the Ocean Frontier Institute, a collaborative research initiative aimed at harnessing the vast potential of the world's oceans.

=== UArctic Membership ===
The university is an active member of the University of the Arctic. UArctic is an international cooperative network based in the Circumpolar Arctic region, consisting of more than 200 universities, colleges, and other organizations with an interest in promoting education and research in the Arctic region.

The university participates in UArctic’s mobility program north2north. The aim of that program is to enable students of member institutions to study in different parts of the North.

== Student life ==
=== Athletics ===
The UPEI Panthers have nine teams playing in the Atlantic University Sport (AUS) and the Canadian Interuniversity Sport (CIS), including men's and women's ice hockey, soccer, basketball, as well as women's field hockey and rugby union and co-ed swimming.

The UPEI campus provides its students with many athletics amenities typically found on university campuses. The CARI Complex is a public recreation facility located on the campus and includes two hockey rinks (the MacLauchlan Arena as well as a practice rink) as well as two 25-metre swimming pools (a shallow recreational wading pool, and an eight-lane competitive pool with diving boards). In 2009 UPEI inaugurated the UPEI Alumni Canada Games Place which was built in part to host the 2009 Canada Games. It consists of a "class 2" eight-lane 400-metre running track and rugby field that has spectator seating for 1,335.

=== Student Union ===
The UPEI Student Union (UPEISU) is the students' union representing full-time undergraduate students at the university. It is funded by a student fee collected by the university, and provides advocacy, services, and amenities. The UPEISU Executive and UPEISU Council are elected through general elections of the UPEI full-time undergraduate student body. The Executive is made up a President, VP Academic, VP External, VP Student Life, and VP Finance. The UPEISU Council sits bi-weekly throughout the academic semester and includes representatives from faculty and special interest groups.

The amenities and services provided by the UPEISU include: Health and Dental Insurance, Charlottetown Transit System UPASS, Representation and Advocacy - including membership and lobbying in partnership with Canadian Alliance of Student Associations (CASA), Inspiring Innovation Fund, Student Academic Enrichment Fund, Off-Campus Housing Coordination, Volunteer Match Maker, Promotions and Advertising, UPEI Student Handbook, and the W.A. Murphy Student Centre (in collaboration with UPEI).

The businesses and operations of the UPEISU include:

- The Fox and the Crow - A pub and café combo which serves a full restaurant menu as well as coffee, tea, specialty drinks, and fresh baked goods.
- The Cadre - student-run (and editorially autonomous) newspaper.
- The Nexus - the official yearbook of UPEI.

The UPEI Student Union publishes the school newspaper called The Cadre, which gained attention by becoming one of the first Canadian publications to print the controversial Muhammad cartoons from the Jyllands-Posten.

== Residence ==
The University of Prince Edward Island provides student accommodations in four different residence buildings on campus: Bill and Denise Andrew Hall, Blanchard Hall, Bernardine Hall, and a mixed-use Performing Arts Centre and Residence. Bill and Denise Andrew Hall has two-room suites with single bedrooms. In Blanchard Hall, each suite has two single bedrooms with a kitchenette and a living room. Bernardine Hall (known as "Bernie" to the students) offers suites with two double bedrooms and a shared bathroom. Although the hall is co-ed, one floor is female-only.

Opened in 2023, the Performing Arts Centre and Residence features two towers of residence apartments and lounges with classroom space and a 400-seat auditorium on the main floor.

== UPEI/SDU/PWC notable people ==
=== List of presidents ===
- Ronald James Baker (1969–1978)
- Peter P.M. Meincke (1978–1985)
- Charles William John Eliot (1985–1995)
- Elizabeth Rollins Epperly (1995–1998)
- Wade MacLauchlan (1999–2011)
- Alaa Abd-El-Aziz (2011–2021)
- Gregory Keefe (2021–2024)
- Wendy Rodgers (2024–present)

=== Religion ===
- James Charles McGuigan - Cardinal; Archbishop of Toronto; Cardinal-Priest of Santa Maria del Popolo in Rome.
- Joseph Anthony O'Sullivan - Grad of Grand Séminaire de Montréal; Archbishop of Kingston, Ontario; Titular Archbishop of Maraguia
- James Morrison - Archbishop, Bishop of Antigonish, Nova Scotia; studied at the Urban College of the Congregatio de Propaganda Fide in Rome.
- James Charles McDonald - 4th Bishop of Charlottetown; Studied at Grand Séminaire de Montréal
- John T. McNeill - Theological Historian; Graduate of McGill University, University of Edinburgh, and University of Chicago

=== Medical ===
- Heather G. Morrison - Rhodes Scholar, Oxford University, Medical Doctor, Chief Public Health Officer of PEI.
- Sir Andrew Macphail - Physician; Writer for Chicago Times; Enlisted in Canadian Army in WW I at age 50 as ambulance driver. Knighted in 1918 for literary and military work.
- John Joseph Alban Gillis - Surgeon, Senior House Doctor at Royal Victoria Hospital, Montreal; MLA in British Columbia Legislative Assembly; Mayor of Merritt, British Columbia
- William Henry Sutherland - Physician at Royal Victoria Hospital, Montreal, for the Canadian Pacific Railway, and the Hotel Vancouver; Mayor of Revelstoke, British Columbia
- James Walter MacNeill - Physician; First superintendent of Saskatchewan Hospital; Early developer for advanced treatments of the mentally ill
- Owen Trainor - Physician; Member of Parliament for Winnipeg Manitoba South; Died during first term in House of Commons
- Augustine A. MacDonald - Physician & Member of Legislative Assembly; Awarded Order of Canada in 1968 for providing medical care to the people of rural Prince Edward Island for more than sixty years

=== Business ===
- Frank Zakem - LLD, B.A., B.Ed., B.Com., OPEI. businessman, politician, educator, author
- Brenton St. John - Businessman, fish factory director, farm commodity exporter; Speaker of PEI Legislative Assembly
- Henry Callbeck - Ship Builder, Businessman, Sheriff of Queens County, Governor of Prince of Wales College
- Don McDougall (baseball) - President of Labatt Brewing Company; principal in establishment of Toronto Blue Jays

=== Prince Edward Island Lieutenant Governor (Viceregal) ===
- Willibald Joseph MacDonald - 19th Lieutenant Governor (Viceregal) of PEI; Soldier in WW I and WW II
- Marion Reid - C.M.Order of Canada, OPEI Order of Prince Edward Island, 24th Lieutenant Governor (Viceregal) of PEI (and first woman Lt. Gov); Dame of Grace of The Most Venerable Order of the Hospital of Saint John of Jerusalem (Order of Saint John (chartered 1888))
- George William Howlan - 6th Lieutenant Governor (Viceregal) of PEI; Irish-born merchant and ship owner
- Augustine Colin Macdonald - 10th Lieutenant Governor (Viceregal) of PEI; also long time Member of Parliament
- Murdock MacKinnon - 11th Lieutenant Governor (Viceregal) of PEI; Farmer; PEI Commissioner of Agriculture
- Donald Alexander MacKinnon - 8th Lieutenant Governor (Viceregal) of PEI; Attorney, also grad Dalhousie School of Law
- Thomas William Lemuel Prowse - 17th Lieutenant Governor (Vicregal) of PEI; 26th Mayor of Charlottetown; President of Prowse Brother, Ltd
- Frederick Walter Hyndman - 18th Lieutenant Governor (Viceregal) of PEI; Canadian Army Major in WW II
- Frank Richard Heartz - 12th Lieutenant Governor (Viceregal) of PEI; also businessman and farmer
- Gordon Lockhart Bennett - 21st Lieutenant Governor (Viceregal) of PEI; Chemistry Professor at Prince of Wales College; Canadian Curling Hall of Fame

=== Prince Edward Island Premier ===
- Lemuel Owen - 2nd Premier of PEI; Shipbuilder, Banker; Merchant
- Sir William Wilfred Sullivan - 4th Premier of PEI; Knighted by King George V.
- Louis Henry Davies - 3rd Premier of PEI, Member of Parliament, 12th Puisne Justice of the Supreme Court of Canada, 6th Chief Justice of Canada
- Frederick Peters - 6th Premier of PEI; mother was Mary Cunard (eldest daughter of Sir Samuel Cunard)
- Donald Farquharson - 8th Premier of PEI; Member of Parliament; MLA
- Herbert James Palmer - 11th Premier of PEI; son of former colonial Premier Edward Palmer (Canadian politician).
- Aubin-Edmond Arsenault - 13th Premier of Prince Edward Island, PEI Supreme Court Judge
- Albert Charles Saunders - 16th Premier of Prince Edward Island; PEI Supreme Court Judge; elected four times as mayor of Summerside PEI
- Thane Campbell - 19th Premier of PEI, Rhodes Scholar, also grad Oxford University
- Bennett Campbell - 24th Premier of PEI
- Alexander Warburton - Also grad University of Edinburgh. PEI Member of Parliament, 7th Premier of Prince Edward Island
- James Lee - 26th Premier of PEI; Sworn to Privy Council of Canada by Her Majesty Queen Elizabeth II.
- Keith Milligan - 29th Premier of PEI
- William J.P. MacMillan - 18th Premier of PEI; also M.D. and graduate of McGill University School of Medicine
- James David Stewart - 15th Premier of PEI
- Walter Russell Shaw - 22nd Premier of PEI; Officer of the Order of Canada; Canadian Agricultural Hall of Fame in 1980.
- John Howatt Bell - 14th Premier of PEI; PEI Member of Parliament
- John Alexander Mathieson - 12th Premier of PEI

=== Prince Edward Island Members Legislative Assembly ===
- Prosper Arsenault - Educator; Politician, Speaker of the PEI Legislative Assembly
- Cletus Dunn - MLA, Civil Servant
- Cynthia Dunsford - MLA, Squash Coach, Writer/Performer of CBC Radio comedy show "Parkdale Doris."
- Paul Connolly - Educator, Politician; Member National Parole Board in 2002, serving for seven years.
- Jamie Ballem - MLA, Businessman; founded Island Green Power Company to promote the development of wind power on the island
- Herb Dickieson - MLA, Physician, also grad Dalhousie University School of Medicine; Chief of Medical Staff at Charlottetown Community Hospital
- Doug Currie - MLA; Head Coach and Director of Hockey Operations for the University of Prince Edward Island.
- Valerie Docherty - MLA
- Paula Biggar - MLA
- Alan Buchanan - MLA, Educational Administrator; Communication Officer with Island Telecom and later Aliant,
- Kevin MacAdam - MLA, Political Advisor
- James Warburton - MLA, Mayor of Charlottetown, Physician
- Jim Larkin - MLA; Executive with Tourism Industry Association of Canada
- George Dewar - MLA; Physician in private practice and earlier with Royal Canadian Medical Corps in WW II; member Order of Canada
- Betty Jean Brown - MLA, Nurse Practitioner; Owner of family fur farm
- David McKenna - Optometrist, businessman and politician, MLA in Legislative Assembly of Prince Edward Island

=== Canada national government ===
- Mark MacGuigan - Attorney General of Canada; Secretary of State for External Affairs in the cabinet of Prime Minister Pierre Trudeau
- Jacques Hebert - Quebec Senator to Parliament; Author Deux innocents en Chine rouge (with Pierre Trudeau)
- Mike Duffy - PEI Senator to Parliament of Canada; TV news show host; covered fall of Saigon, Vietnam
- Percy Downe - PEI Senator to Parliament of Canada; Chief of Staff for Prime Minister Jean Chrétien
- Lorne Bonnell - PEI Senator to Parliament of Canada; Physician
- John McLean - PEI Senator to Parliament of Canada; earlier Member of Parliament; MLA; Director of several businesses, i.e., Maritime Life Insurance Co. and The Guardian newspaper
- Melvin McQuaid - PEI Member of Parliament of Canada; PEI Supreme Court Judge
- Alfred Lefurgey - PEI Member of Parliament of Canada; also grad Harvard Law
- Thomas Joseph Kickham - PEI Senator to Parliament of Canada
- James McIsaac - PEI Member of Parliament of Canada; also grad Université Laval
- Angus Alexander McLean - PEI Member of Parliament of Canada; also grad Harvard Law
- Peter Adolphus McIntyre - PEI Member of Parliament; 7th Lieutenant Governor (Viceregal) of PEI
- Joe McGuire - PEI Member of Parliament of Canada
- Shawn Murphy - PEI Member of Parliament; Attorney, Queen's Counsel
- George Henderson; PEI Member of Parliament; Shellfish Technician; Farmer, Electrical Engineer and Businessman
- Chester McLure - PEI Member of Parliament; Fox Farmer; Honorary Lieutenant-Colonel in 1930 for the 2nd Medium Light Artillery
- Montague Aldous - Dominion Topographical Surveyor of the Northwest Territories 1877; also grad of Bowdoin College, Maine
- Thomas McMillan - political scientist and former politician, Member of Parliament; Minister of the Environment

=== Provincial/local governments of Canada ===
- David Laird - 1st Lieutenant Governor of Northwest Territories, Canada; Indian Commissioner of the Northwest Territories, Manitoba, and Keewatin
- Bob MacQuarrie - Ontario MLA
- George Washington McPhee - Saskatchewan Member of Parliament of Canada; Attorney, King's Counsel
- Robert Deschamps - Member National Assembly of Quebec; Parti Québécois member and supporter of sovereignty of Quebec
- F.H. Auld - Agricultural Scientist, Saskatchewan Deputy Minister of Agriculture, 1916–46
- Harold Lloyd Henderson - Presbyterian minister, Mayor Portage la Prairie, Manitoba; also grad McGill University
- John Salmon Lamont - PWC and Princeton University, Reeve of Assinibola, Manitoba
- John K. McInnis - Mayor of Regina, Saskatchewan
- Maurice DeLory - MLA in Nova Scotia House of Assembly; Surgeon
- Alexander Campbell - represented St. John's in the Newfoundland and Labrador House of Assembly, 1928–32; also grad Royal College of Physicians of Edinburgh and the University of Vienna.

=== Arts and letters ===
- Lucy Maud Montgomery - Author: Anne of Green Gables, Avonlea
- Irene Gammel - Literary Historian: Baroness Elsa, Looking for Anne of Green Gables
- Sandra M. Macdonald - Chairperson National Film Board of Canada
- John Smith - Poet Laureate of PEI
- Rachna Gilmore - Children's Book Writer; 1999 Governor General's Award for Children's Literature
- Anne Compton - Poet; 2005 Governor General's Award for Poetry; 2012 awarded Queen Elizabeth II Diamond Jubilee Medal
- Tyler Shaw - Singer; 2012 Billboard Canada Adult Contemporary # 5 song "Kiss Goodnight." Song was certified Gold by Music Canada in 2013.
- James Jeffrey Roche - Writer, American Consul in Switzerland; Editor of Boston Pilot newspaper

=== Education ===
- John Angus Weir - 4th President of Wilfrid Laurier University, Waterloo, Ontario; also grad University of Notre Dame
- William Christopher Macdonald - 4th Chancellor of McGill University; founder MacDonald & Brothers tobacco company
- Elizabeth Rollins Epperly - Victorian Scholar; grad UPEI and University of London; President of UPEI, 1995–98
- Marin Gallant - Educator, MLA, Inspector for PEI French Schools
- Scott MacEachern - Professor of Archaeology and Anthropology at Duke Kunshan University, China, an expert in African archaeology.
- Kathy Martin - Professor in the Faculty of Forestry at the University of British Columbia and a senior research scientist with Environment and Climate Change Canada
- Tim Carroll - Assistant Professor of History at Saint Francis Xavier University & UPEI; MLA in Legislative Assembly of Prince Edward Island

=== Philanthropist ===
- Jean-Louis Lévesque - Philanthropist, entrepreneur, racehorse owner

=== Prince Edward Island law/legal ===
- Wayne Cheverie - PEI Supreme Court Judge
- Gerard Mitchell - Chief Justice PEI Supreme Court
- Charles St. Clair Trainor - Chief Justice PEI Supreme Court, King's Counsel
- Gavan Duffy - Judge of the Prince Edward Island County Court, sitting in Queens County; King's Counsel; Grand Master Knights of Columbus
- Reginald Bell - PEI Supreme Court Judge
- George McMahon - PEI Supreme Court Judge

=== Other Canada law/legal ===
- Sir James Hyndman - Alberta Supreme Court Judge; Inducted as a Commander of the Order of the British Empire in 1948.
- J. Greg Peters - Superintendent of the Royal Canadian Mounted Police and Usher of the Black Rod of the Senate of Canada.

=== U.S. government ===
- Jacob Gould Schurman - US Ambassador to Germany; President Cornell University
- Cyrus S. Ching - U.S. federal administrator, US Department of Labor Hall of Honor
- James U. Campbell - 25th Chief Justice Oregon Supreme Court, USA; U.S. Lieutenant in Philippines during Spanish–American War
- Burpee L. Steeves - 9th Lieutenant Governor of Idaho; also grad Willamette University, Oregon

=== Prince Edward Island local government ===
- Ian MacDonald - 43rd Mayor of Charlottetown; Known as "Tex"
- William S. Stewart - Mayor of Charlottetown, 1932–34; MLA; Admiralty Court Judge
- Philip Brown - Mayor of Charlottetown, as of January 2019; teacher and businessman

=== Military ===
- Ralph McInerney - World War I Pilot in Royal Flying Corps; Represented the city of Saint John, New Brunswick in the Legislative Assembly of New Brunswick from 1939 to 1948.
- Roger Soloman - Lieutenant Royal Canadian Navy; Tourist cottages business owner on Brudenell River, PEI; High School Principal
- Keith Brown - Scottish politician; Deputy Leader of the Scottish National Party; Royal Marines in Falklands War

=== Athletics ===
- Scott Morrison - Assistant Coach of Boston Celtics, 2017+; 2014-15 NBA Developmental League (D-League) Coach of the Year with Maine Red Claws
- Doug MacLean - NHL General Manager and Coach for the Columbus Blue Jackets and the Head Coach for Florida Panthers; Coach for two NHL All Star games, 1995–97; earlier after playing varsity hockey for the UPEI Panthers became hockey coach for the University of New Brunswick. Known as "Prince Eddy" because of his affinity for Prince Edward Island
- Al MacAdam - NHL Hockey Player, Stanley Cup Champion 1974, NHL All-Star 1976 & 1977
- Bill MacMillan - NHL Hockey Player, Bronze Medal 1976 Winter Olympics in Grenoble, France
- Joel Ward - NHL Hockey Player, Team Canada 2014 IIHF World Championship in Minsk, Belarus
- Dave Cameron - NHL Coach (2016 Ass't Coach Calgary Flames) and Player (Colorado Rockies and New Jersey Devils)
- Darwin McCutcheon - Hockey player; five years professional in American Hockey League and Int'l Hockey League. Played one game in NHL for Toronto Maple Leafs
- Gerry Fleming - NHL hockey player for the Montreal Canadiens and American Hockey League for the Fredericton Canadiens
- Jim Foley - CFL Football Player, Grey Cup Champion 1973 & 1976, CFL's Rookie of the Year Award in 1971 and later won 1975 Most Outstanding Canadian Award
- Vernon Pahl - CFL Football Player, Grey Cup Champion 1984 & 1988
- Erin Carmody - Curler, MVP 2010 Scotties Tournament of Hearts
- Paul Craig - NASL Soccer Player, FC Edmonton
- Kara Grant - Modern Pentathlon: Athens Olympics 2004 and Beijing Olympics 2008; Bronze Medalist at Pan American Games in Rio de Janeiro, Brazil 2002
- Anja Weisser - German Women's Ice Hockey Team, 2014 Olympics in Sochi, Russia
- Park Ye-eun - Korean Women's Ice Hockey Team, 2018 Olympics in Pyeongchang, Korea.
- Katie Baker - Captain Canada National Field Hockey Team; Pan American Games 2007 in Brazil; Commonwealth Games 2010 in Delhi, India.
- Cory Vitarelli - Lacrosse player for Rochester Knighthawks in National Lacrosse League. Three time Champion's Cup now known as (National Lacrosse League Cup) winner.
- Ryan Anstey - soccer player Toronto Lynx USL First Division, Crown Attorney in Alberta
- Jared Gomes - hockey player; Bridgeport Sound Tigers, American Hockey League
- Justin Donati - hockey player; Brampton Beast, ECHL; Toronto St. Michael's Majors, Ontario Hockey League
- Calvin Tyler Scott - professional basketball player in the National Basketball League of Canada for the Island Storm
- Mitch Murphy - Standardbred Canada Board of Directors (horse racing); MLA
- Mathew Maione - professional hockey player for Dinamo Riga in the Kontinental Hockey League, Russia
- Mark Guggenberger - professional ice hockey goaltender with the Perth Thunder of the Australian Ice Hockey League (AIHL)

=== Notable UPEI faculty and administration ===
- Angus Bernard MacEachern - Founded St. Andrew's College; 1st Bishop of Charlottetown (incl Magdalen Islands); studied theology in Spain.
- Bernard Donald Macdonald - 2nd Bishop of Charlottetown; Supervisor of construction of Saint Dunstan's College
- Wade MacLauchlan - 32nd Premier of PEI, President UPEI; grad University of New Brunswick and Yale University with Masters of Law
- William E. Andrew - Chancellor UPEI
- Ronald James Baker - 1st president of UPEI; British Air Force WW II; Queen Elizabeth II Diamond Jubilee Medal; grad University of British Columbia and School of Oriental and African Studies at the University of London
- Lou Hooper - Professor of Music from 1975; jazz pianist in Harlem, Yew York, Michigan, and Canada. Played with Billie Holiday and Paul Robeson; Taught piano to Oscar Peterson, 1936–39
- Dave Nutbrown - Varsity basketball coach; conference all-star player at University of New Brunswick; recruit of New York Knicks
- Gustave Gingras - Chancellor of UPEI, 1974–82. Physician; Consultant to United Nations, World Health Organization, and Canadian Red Cross
- George Wastie Deblois - Merchant; MLA; Trustee of Prince of Wales College; Land agent for Samuel Cunard, founder of the Cunard Line of ships
- Richard Raiswell - Historian and Professor of Medieval and Renaissance History; commentator on Smithsonian Network's "Treasures Decoded;" Cricket enthusiast and writer about the sport
- Kenneth Ozmon - Professor and Dean of Arts; Officer of the Order of Canada; later 13th President of Mount Allison University
- Godfrey Baldacchino - UNESCO Co-chair in Island Studies and Sustainability at UPEI (in partnership with the University of Malta)
- Doris Anderson - Chancellor of UPEI, 1992-96: editor Chatelaine magazine; Member of Trilateral Commission; Companion of the Order of Canada; President of the National Action Committee on the Status of Women
- Paul Boutilier - Instructor of International Marketing; Member of the 1983 Stanley Cup champion New York Islanders and seven year NHL player
- David Bourque - Associate Professor of Music (Spring 2008 term); teacher of clarinet and bass clarinet; member of Toronto Symphony Orchestra; accompanist in several US films, e.g., Academy Award-winning Norman Jewison's film "Moonstruck"
- Reginald C. Stuart - History Professor at UPEI, 1968–88. Distinguished Chair in North American Studies at the Woodrow Wilson Institute Center for Scholars in Washington, DC, Jun-Jan, 2005
- Jamie Muir - Instructor of Education; Ph.D. in education from University of Virginia; also an MLA in Nova Scotia
- David Staines - Professor of English; Scholar in Medieval, Victorian, and Canadian literature; grad of Harvard University (M.A. and Ph.D.)
- Louis Groarke - Professor of Philosophy; Writings in Ethics, Logic, Political Philosophy, and Aesthetics
- Anne Simpson - Author and poet; author of seven books, four of which are in the Toronto Globe & Mails Top 100 Books of the Year, i.e., "Falling" (2008) and "Canterbury Beach" (2001) (Short term Writer-in-Residence)
- Vianne Timmons - Professor at UPEI; President of the University of Regina (Alberta)
- Edward MacDonald - Associate Professor of History, teaching about Canadian political history, Atlantic Canada and Prince Edward Island
- Colm Magner - Canadian actor, director and writer
- Richard Covey - Canadian composer and Assistant Professor of Theory/Composition
- Ian Dowbiggin - Professor in the Department of History and writer on the history of medicine. Fellow of the Royal Society of Canada.
- Paul Boutilier - Instructor of International Marketing; Retired professional ice hockey defenceman who was a member of the 1983 Stanley Cup champion New York Islanders.
- Silver Donald Cameron - Writer-in-Residence; writing focuses on social justice, nature and the environment
- Sam Gindin - Intellectual and activist known for his expertise on the labour movement and the economics of the automobile industry
- Hilda Woolnough - Artist who exhibited in Europe, Asia, the Caribbean and North America; member of Royal Canadian Academy of Arts
- Robyn MacPhee - Virology technologist at the Atlantic Veterinary College, UPEI; Gold Medalist 2001 World Junior Curling Championships
- Marcia Anastasia Christoforides - Established the Sir James Dunn Animal Welfare Centre at UPEI with gift of 2.2 million dollars. Wife of Max Aitken, 1st Baron Beaverbrook with honorific as Dowager Lady Beaverbrook.
- Sir Charles Dalton – Silver fox breeder; Owner of the Charlottetown Guardian newspaper; Donated and built Dalton Hall at SDU; Knight Commander in the Order of St. Gregory the Great

== See also ==
- Higher education in Prince Edward Island

== Histories of the University ==
- Bruce, Marian. A Century of Excellence: Prince of Wales College, 1860–1969. Charlottetown: Prince of Wales Alumni Association/Island Studies Press, 2005.
- Bruce, Marian. Pets, Professors, and Politicians: The Founding and Early Years of the Atlantic Veterinary College. Charlottetown: Atlantic Veterinary College/Island Studies Press, 2004.
- MacEachern, Alan. Utopian U: The Founding of the University of Prince Edward Island, 1968–1970. Charlottetown: University of Prince Edward Island, 2005.
- Moase, Lorne Robert. "The Development of the University of Prince Edward Island, 1964-1972." M.Ed., University of New Brunswick, 1972.
