= List of senators in the 30th Parliament of Canada =

This is a list of members of the Senate of Canada in the 30th Parliament of Canada.

The province of Quebec has 24 Senate divisions which are constitutionally mandated. In all other provinces, a Senate division is strictly an optional designation of the senator's own choosing, and has no real constitutional or legal standing. A senator who does not choose a special senate division is designated a senator for the province at large.

Names in bold indicate senators in the 20th Canadian Ministry.

== List of senators ==
=== Senators at the beginning of the 30th Parliament ===
Name	Party	Province (Division)	Date appointed	Appointed by	Left office	Reason
John Black Aird	Liberal	Ontario	November 10, 1964	Pearson	November 28, 1974	Resignation
Hazen Argue	Liberal	Saskatchewan	February 24, 1966	Pearson	October 2, 1991	Death
Martial Asselin	Progressive Conservative	Quebec	September 1, 1972	Trudeau	August 7, 1990	Resignation
Irvine Barrow	Liberal	Nova Scotia	May 8, 1974	Trudeau	February 15, 1988	Retirement
Michael Basha	Liberal	Newfoundland and Labrador	January 24, 1951	St. Laurent	November 18, 1976	Resignation
Louis-Philippe Beaubien	Progressive Conservative	Quebec	November 16, 1960	Diefenbaker	March 28, 1985	Death
Rhéal Bélisle	Progressive Conservative	Ontario	February 4, 1963	Diefenbaker	November 3, 1992	Death
Nancy Bell	Liberal	British Columbia	October 7, 1970	Trudeau	November 29, 1989	Death
William Moore Benidickson	Liberal	Ontario	July 7, 1965	Pearson	January 4, 1985	Death
Frederick Murray Blois	Progressive Conservative	Nova Scotia	January 14, 1960	Diefenbaker	October 12, 1976	Resignation
Lorne Bonnell	Liberal	Prince Edward Island	November 4, 1971	Trudeau	January 4, 1998	Retirement
William Albert Boucher	Liberal	Saskatchewan	January 3, 1957	St. Laurent	June 23, 1976	Death
Maurice Bourget	Liberal	Quebec	April 27, 1963	Pearson	March 29, 1979	Death
Romuald Bourque	Liberal	Quebec	July 6, 1963	Pearson	August 14, 1974	Death
Sidney Buckwold	Liberal	Saskatchewan	November 4, 1971	Trudeau	November 3, 1991	Retirement
George Percival Burchill	Liberal	New Brunswick	April 19, 1945	King	August 19, 1977	Resignation
Donald Cameron	Independent Liberal	Alberta	July 28, 1955	St. Laurent	September 19, 1987	Resignation
Chesley William Carter	Liberal	Newfoundland and Labrador	July 8, 1966	Pearson	July 28, 1977	Retirement
Lionel Choquette	Progressive Conservative	Ontario	January 31, 1958	Diefenbaker	March 6, 1981	Resignation
Harold Connolly	Liberal	Nova Scotia	July 28, 1955	St. Laurent	May 14, 1979	Resignation
John Joseph Connolly	Liberal	Ontario	June 12, 1953	St. Laurent	October 31, 1981	Resignation
Eric Cook	Liberal	Newfoundland and Labrador	February 14, 1964	Pearson	July 26, 1984	Resignation
Jean-Pierre Côté	Liberal	Quebec	September 1, 1972	Trudeau	April 20, 1978	Resignation
Ernest G. Cottreau	Liberal	Nova Scotia	May 8, 1974	Trudeau	January 28, 1989	Retirement
David Croll	Liberal	Ontario	July 28, 1955	St. Laurent	June 11, 1991	Death
Keith Davey	Liberal	Ontario	February 24, 1966	Pearson	July 1, 1996	Resignation
Azellus Denis	Liberal	Quebec	February 3, 1964	Pearson	September 4, 1991	Death
Jean-Paul Deschatelets	Liberal	Quebec	February 24, 1966	Pearson	January 10, 1986	Resignation
Paul Desruisseaux	Liberal	Quebec	July 8, 1966	Pearson	May 1, 1980	Retirement
James Duggan	Liberal	Newfoundland and Labrador	July 8, 1966	Pearson	February 28, 1978	Resignation
Raymond Eudes	Liberal	Quebec	April 8, 1968	Pearson	October 25, 1980	Death
Douglas Everett	Liberal	Manitoba	November 8, 1966	Pearson	January 20, 1994	Resignation
Muriel McQueen Fergusson	Liberal	New Brunswick	May 19, 1953	St. Laurent	May 23, 1975	Resignation
Jacques Flynn	Progressive Conservative	Quebec	November 9, 1962	Diefenbaker	August 22, 1990	Resignation
Eugene Forsey	Liberal	Ontario	October 7, 1970	Trudeau	May 29, 1979	Retirement
Edgar Fournier	Progressive Conservative	New Brunswick	September 24, 1962	Diefenbaker	February 11, 1983	Resignation
J. Michel Fournier	Liberal	New Brunswick	December 9, 1971	Trudeau	September 29, 1980	Retirement
Sarto Fournier	Liberal	Quebec	June 12, 1953	St. Laurent	July 23, 1980	Death
Louis-Philippe Gélinas	Liberal	Quebec	June 11, 1963	Pearson	December 10, 1975	Resignation
Louis Giguère	Liberal	Quebec	September 10, 1968	Trudeau	December 18, 1986	Retirement
John Morrow Godfrey	Liberal	Ontario	October 5, 1973	Trudeau	June 28, 1987	Retirement
Carl Goldenberg	Liberal	Quebec	November 4, 1971	Trudeau	October 20, 1982	Retirement
Léon Mercier Gouin	Liberal	Quebec	November 7, 1940	King	March 18, 1976	Resignation
Alasdair Graham	Liberal	Nova Scotia	April 27, 1972	Trudeau	May 21, 2004	Retirement
Joe Greene	Liberal	Ontario	September 1, 1972	Trudeau	October 23, 1978	Death
Allister Grosart	Progressive Conservative	Ontario	September 24, 1962	Diefenbaker	December 13, 1981	Resignation
James Campbell Haig	Progressive Conservative	Manitoba	June 15, 1962	Diefenbaker	December 29, 1977	Resignation
Earl Hastings	Liberal	Alberta	February 24, 1966	Pearson	May 5, 1996	Death
Salter Hayden	Liberal	Ontario	February 9, 1940	King	November 1, 1983	Resignation
Harry Hays	Liberal	Alberta	February 24, 1966	Pearson	May 4, 1982	Death
Henry Hicks	Liberal	Nova Scotia	April 27, 1972	Trudeau	March 5, 1990	Retirement
Florence Elsie Inman	Liberal	Prince Edward Island	July 28, 1955	St. Laurent	May 31, 1986	Death
Thomas Joseph Kickham	Liberal	Prince Edward Island	July 8, 1966	Pearson	December 1, 1974	Death
Paul Lafond	Liberal	Quebec	October 7, 1970	Trudeau	May 27, 1988	Death
Arthur Laing	Liberal	British Columbia	September 1, 1972	Trudeau	February 13, 1975	Death
John Keith McBroom Laird	Liberal	Ontario	April 6, 1967	Pearson	January 12, 1982	Retirement
Maurice Lamontagne	Liberal	Quebec	April 6, 1967	Pearson	June 12, 1983	Death
Daniel Lang	Liberal	Ontario	February 14, 1964	Pearson	June 13, 1994	Resignation
Léopold Langlois	Liberal	Quebec	July 8, 1966	Pearson	October 2, 1988	Retirement
Renaude Lapointe	Liberal	Quebec	November 10, 1971	Trudeau	January 3, 1987	Retirement
Edward M. Lawson	Independent	British Columbia	October 7, 1970	Trudeau	September 24, 2004	Retirement
J.-Eugène Lefrançois	Liberal	Quebec	April 25, 1957	St. Laurent	November 5, 1976	Resignation
John Michael Macdonald	Progressive Conservative	Nova Scotia	June 24, 1960	Diefenbaker	June 20, 1997	Death
Alan Macnaughton	Liberal	Quebec	July 8, 1966	Pearson	July 30, 1978	Retirement
Ernest Manning	Social Credit	Alberta	October 7, 1970	Trudeau	September 20, 1983	Retirement
**Paul Martin Sr.**	**Liberal**	**Ontario**	**April 20, 1968**	**Trudeau**	**October 30, 1974**	**Resignation**
Alexander Hamilton McDonald	Liberal	Saskatchewan	August 13, 1965	Pearson	March 31, 1980	Death
Charles McElman	Liberal	New Brunswick	February 24, 1966	Pearson	April 1, 1990	Resignation
Frederic McGrand	Liberal	New Brunswick	July 28, 1955	St. Laurent	January 22, 1988	Resignation
George McIlraith	Liberal	Ontario	April 27, 1972	Trudeau	July 29, 1983	Retirement
William Craig McNamara	Liberal	Manitoba	October 7, 1970	Trudeau	August 8, 1979	Retirement
Hervé Michaud	Liberal	New Brunswick	March 15, 1968	Pearson	June 5, 1978	Death
Gildas Molgat	Liberal	Manitoba	October 7, 1970	Trudeau	February 28, 2001	Death
Hartland Molson	Independent	Quebec	July 28, 1955	St. Laurent	May 31, 1993	Resignation
Joan Neiman	Liberal	Ontario	September 1, 1972	Trudeau	September 9, 1995	Retirement
Margaret Norrie	Liberal	Nova Scotia	April 27, 1972	Trudeau	October 16, 1980	Retirement
Grattan O'Leary	Progressive Conservative	Ontario	September 24, 1962	Diefenbaker	April 7, 1976	Death
Norman McLeod Paterson	Liberal	Ontario	February 9, 1940	King	June 18, 1981	Resignation
**Ray Perrault**	**Liberal**	**British Columbia**	**October 5, 1973**	**Trudeau**	**February 6, 2001**	**Retirement**
William Petten	Liberal	Newfoundland and Labrador	April 8, 1968	Pearson	January 28, 1998	Retirement
Orville Howard Phillips	Progressive Conservative	Prince Edward Island	February 5, 1963	Diefenbaker	March 24, 1999	Resignation
James Harper Prowse	Liberal	Alberta	February 24, 1966	Pearson	September 27, 1976	Death
Josie Alice Quart	Progressive Conservative	Quebec	November 16, 1960	Diefenbaker	April 17, 1980	Death
Maurice Riel	Liberal	Quebec	October 5, 1973	Trudeau	April 3, 1997	Retirement
Daniel Aloysius Riley	Liberal	New Brunswick	December 21, 1973	Trudeau	September 13, 1984	Death
Louis Robichaud	Liberal	New Brunswick	December 21, 1973	Trudeau	October 21, 2000	Retirement
Frederick William Rowe	Liberal	Newfoundland and Labrador	December 9, 1971	Trudeau	September 28, 1987	Retirement
Donald Smith	Liberal	Nova Scotia	July 28, 1955	St. Laurent	July 7, 1980	Resignation
Herbert O. Sparrow	Liberal	Saskatchewan	February 9, 1968	Pearson	January 4, 2005	Retirement
Richard Stanbury	Liberal	Ontario	February 13, 1968	Pearson	May 2, 1998	Retirement
Joseph Albert Sullivan	Progressive Conservative	Ontario	October 12, 1957	Diefenbaker	February 18, 1985	Resignation
Andy Thompson	Liberal	Ontario	April 6, 1967	Pearson	March 23, 1998	Resignation
George Van Roggen	Liberal	British Columbia	November 4, 1971	Trudeau	June 8, 1992	Death
David James Walker	Progressive Conservative	Ontario	February 4, 1963	Diefenbaker	September 30, 1989	Resignation
Frank Corbett Welch	Progressive Conservative	Nova Scotia	September 25, 1962	Diefenbaker	July 14, 1975	Resignation
Guy Williams	Liberal	British Columbia	December 9, 1971	Trudeau	October 7, 1982	Retirement
Paul Yuzyk	Progressive Conservative	Manitoba	February 4, 1963	Diefenbaker	July 9, 1986	Death

=== Senators appointed during the 30th Parliament ===
Name	Party	Province (Division)	Date appointed	Appointed by	Left office	Reason
George Isaac Smith	Progressive Conservative	Nova Scotia	August 7, 1975	Trudeau	December 19, 1982	Death
Jack Austin	Liberal	British Columbia	August 19, 1975	Trudeau	March 2, 2007	Retirement
Paul Lucier	Liberal	Yukon	October 23, 1975	Trudeau	July 23, 1999	Death
David Steuart	Liberal	Saskatchewan	December 9, 1976	Trudeau	January 26, 1991	Retirement
Jean Marchand	Liberal	Quebec	December 9, 1976	Trudeau	December 15, 1983	Resignation
John Ewasew	Liberal	Quebec	December 17, 1976	Trudeau	March 26, 1978	Death
Pietro Rizzuto	Liberal	Quebec	December 23, 1976	Trudeau	August 3, 1997	Death
Willie Adams	Liberal	Northwest Territories	April 5, 1977	Trudeau	June 22, 2009	Retirement
Bud Olson	Liberal	Alberta	April 5, 1977	Trudeau	March 7, 1996	Resignation
Royce Frith	Liberal	Ontario	April 5, 1977	Trudeau	August 29, 1994	Resignation
Peter Bosa	Liberal	Ontario	April 5, 1977	Trudeau	December 10, 1998	Death
Dufferin Roblin	Progressive Conservative	Manitoba	March 23, 1978	Trudeau	June 17, 1992	Retirement
Florence Bird	Liberal	Ontario	March 23, 1978	Trudeau	January 15, 1983	Retirement
Jack Marshall	Progressive Conservative	Newfoundland and Labrador	March 23, 1978	Trudeau	November 26, 1994	Retirement
Philip Lewis	Liberal	Newfoundland and Labrador	March 23, 1978	Trudeau	November 28, 1999	Retirement
**Joseph-Philippe Guay**	**Liberal**	**Manitoba**	**March 23, 1978**	**Trudeau**	**October 4, 1990**	**Retirement**
Stanley Haidasz	Liberal	Ontario	March 23, 1978	Trudeau	March 4, 1998	Retirement
Margaret Jean Anderson	Liberal	New Brunswick	March 23, 1978	Trudeau	August 7, 1990	Retirement
Claude Wagner	Progressive Conservative	Quebec	April 21, 1978	Trudeau	July 11, 1979	Death
Norbert Thériault	Liberal	New Brunswick	March 26, 1979	Trudeau	February 16, 1996	Retirement
Robert Muir	Progressive Conservative	Nova Scotia	March 26, 1979	Trudeau	November 10, 1994	Retirement
Dalia Wood	Liberal	Quebec	March 26, 1979	Trudeau	January 31, 1999	Resignation
Fernand Leblanc	Liberal	Quebec	March 27, 1979	Trudeau	July 1, 1992	Retirement
Yvette Boucher Rousseau	Liberal	Quebec	March 27, 1979	Trudeau	March 17, 1988	Death

=== Left Senate during the 30th Parliament ===
Date	Name	Party	Representing	Details
August 14, 1974	Romuald Bourque	Liberal	Quebec	Death
**October 30, 1974**	**Paul Martin Sr.**	**Liberal**	**Ontario**	**Resignation**
November 28, 1974	John Black Aird	Liberal	Ontario	Resignation
December 1, 1974	Thomas Joseph Kickham	Liberal	Prince Edward Island	Death
February 13, 1975	Arthur Laing	Liberal	British Columbia	Death
May 23, 1975	Muriel McQueen Fergusson	Liberal	New Brunswick	Resignation
July 14, 1975	Frank Corbett Welch	Progressive Conservative	Nova Scotia	Resignation
December 10, 1975	Louis-Philippe Gélinas	Liberal	Quebec	Resignation
March 18, 1976	Léon Mercier Gouin	Liberal	Quebec	Resignation
April 7, 1976	Grattan O'Leary	Progressive Conservative	Ontario	Death
June 23, 1976	William Albert Boucher	Liberal	Saskatchewan	Death
September 27, 1976	James Harper Prowse	Liberal	Alberta	Death
October 12, 1976	Frederick Murray Blois	Progressive Conservative	Nova Scotia	Resignation
November 5, 1976	J.-Eugène Lefrançois	Liberal	Quebec	Resignation
November 18, 1976	Michael Basha	Liberal	Newfoundland and Labrador	Resignation
July 28, 1977	Chesley William Carter	Liberal	Newfoundland and Labrador	Retirement
August 19, 1977	George Percival Burchill	Liberal	New Brunswick	Resignation
December 29, 1977	James Campbell Haig	Progressive Conservative	Manitoba	Resignation
February 28, 1978	James Duggan	Liberal	Newfoundland and Labrador	Resignation
March 26, 1978	John Ewasew	Liberal	Quebec	Death
April 20, 1978	Jean-Pierre Côté	Liberal	Quebec	Resignation
June 5, 1978	Hervé Michaud	Liberal	New Brunswick	Death
July 30, 1978	Alan Macnaughton	Liberal	Quebec	Retirement
October 23, 1978	Joe Greene	Liberal	Ontario	Death
March 29, 1979	Maurice Bourget	Liberal	Quebec	Death
May 14, 1979	Harold Connolly	Liberal	Nova Scotia	Resignation

=== Changes in party affiliation during the 30th Parliament ===
There were no changes in party affiliation during the 30th Parliament.

== See also ==
- List of current Canadian senators
