= List of Newfoundland and Labrador senators =

This is a list of past and present members of the Senate of Canada representing the province of Newfoundland and Labrador.

== Current senators ==
Name	Party	Division^{1}	Date appointed	Appointed by^{2}	Mandatory retirement
Fabian Manning	Conservative	Newfoundland and Labrador	May 25, 2011	Harper	May 21, 2039
Vacant		Newfoundland and Labrador			
Iris Petten	Independent Senators Group	Newfoundland and Labrador	May 3, 2023	Trudeau, J	February 5, 2034
Mohamed Ravalia	Independent Senators Group	Newfoundland and Labrador	June 1, 2018	Trudeau, J	August 15, 2033
David Wells	Conservative	Newfoundland and Labrador	January 25, 2013	Harper	February 28, 2037
Judy White	Progressive Senators Group	Newfoundland and Labrador	July 6, 2023	Trudeau, J	January 11, 2039

Notes:

^{1} Senators are appointed to represent Newfoundland and Labrador. Each senator may choose to designate a geographic area within the province as his or her division.

== Historical ==
Name	Party	Division^{1}	Date appointed	Appointed by^{2}	End of term
Alexander Baird	Liberal	St. John's	August 17, 1949	St. Laurent	November 23, 1967
George Baker	Liberal	Newfoundland and Labrador	March 26, 2002	Chrétien	September 4, 2017
Michael Basha	Liberal	West Coast	January 24, 1951	St. Laurent	November 18, 1976
Frederick Gordon Bradley	Liberal	Bonavista-Twillingate	June 12, 1953	St. Laurent	March 30, 1966
Vincent P. Burke	Liberal	St. Jacques	January 25, 1950	St. Laurent	December 19, 1953
Chesley William Carter	Liberal	The Grand Banks	July 8, 1966	Pearson	July 28, 1977
Ethel Cochrane	Conservative	Newfoundland and Labrador	November 17, 1986	Mulroney	September 23, 2012
Eric Cook	Independent	St. John's East	February 14, 1964	Pearson	July 26, 1984
Joan Cook	Liberal	Newfoundland and Labrador	March 6, 1998	Chrétien	October 6, 2009
C. William Doody	Progressive Conservative	Harbour Main-Bell Island	October 3, 1979	Clark	December 27, 2005
Norman Doyle	Conservative	Newfoundland and Labrador	January 6, 2012	Harper	November 11, 2020
James Duggan	Liberal	Avalon	July 8, 1966	Pearson	February 28, 1978
George Furey	Non-affiliated	Newfoundland and Labrador	August 11, 1999	Chrétien	May 12, 2023
John Gilbert Higgins	Progressive Conservative	St. John's East	January 15, 1959	Diefenbaker	July 1, 1963
Malcolm Mercer Hollett	Progressive Conservative	Burin	October 6, 1961	Diefenbaker	March 31, 1971
Philip Lewis	Liberal	St. John's	March 23, 1978	Trudeau, P. E.	November 28, 1999
Fabian Manning	Conservative	Newfoundland and Labrador	January 2, 2009	Harper	March 28, 2011
Elizabeth Marshall	Conservative	Newfoundland and Labrador	January 29, 2010	Harper	March 23, 2026
Jack Marshall	Progressive Conservative	Humber-St. George's-St. Barbe	March 23, 1978	Trudeau, P. E.	November 26, 1994
Gerry Ottenheimer	Progressive Conservative	Waterford-Trinity	December 30, 1987	Mulroney	January 18, 1998
George Penny	Liberal	Newfoundland	August 17, 1949	St. Laurent	December 4, 1949
Ray Petten	Liberal	Bonavista	August 17, 1949	St. Laurent	February 16, 1961
William Petten	Liberal	Bonavista	April 8, 1968	Pearson	January 28, 1998
Calvert Pratt	Liberal	St. John's West	January 24, 1951	St. Laurent	November 13, 1963
Herman William Quinton	Liberal	Burgeo-Lapoile	January 24, 1951	St. Laurent	April 2, 1952
Bill Rompkey	Liberal	Newfoundland and Labrador	September 21, 1995	Chrétien	May 13, 2011
Frederick William Rowe	Liberal	Lewisporte	December 9, 1971	Trudeau, P. E.	September 28, 1987
Raymond Squires	Liberal	Newfoundland and Labrador	June 9, 2000	Chrétien	February 6, 2001

Notes:

^{1} Senators are appointed to represent Newfoundland and Labrador. Each senator may choose to designate a geographic area within the province as his or her division.
^{2} Senators are appointed by the governor general on the recommendation of the prime minister.

== See also ==
- Lists of Canadian senators
