= C. William Doody =

Canadian politician (1931–2005)

Cyril William "Bill" Doody (February 26, 1931 – December 27, 2005) was a member of the Senate of Canada representing Newfoundland and Labrador. Doody was active in provincial politics and was first elected to the Newfoundland and Labrador House of Assembly in 1971 as a member of the Progressive Conservative Party of Newfoundland and Labrador.

Doody was born in St. John's and was educated at Saint Bonaventure's College. In 1971, he resigned from his position as managing director of a supermarket to run for political office. He became Minister of Mines, Agriculture and Resources when Frank Moores formed his government in 1972. In 1975, Doody became the province's finance minister. After Moores resigned, Doody was widely expected to succeed him but was defeated by Brian Peckford in the March 17, 1979 PC leadership convention. Premier Peckford appointed Doody Minister of Mines and Energy.

In October 1979, several months after the 1979 Newfoundland election, Doody left provincial politics and was appointed to the Senate by then Progressive Conservative Prime Minister Joe Clark. He served as Deputy Leader of the Government in the Senate from September 17, 1984 until 1991.

When, in December 2004, the Progressive Conservatives merged with the Canadian Alliance to form the Conservative Party of Canada, Doody decided not to join the new formation. Instead, he continued to sit in the Senate as a member of a five-person Progressive Conservative caucus consisting of himself, Norman Atkins, Lowell Murray, Elaine McCoy and Nancy Ruth. He was to retire from the Senate in February 2006, but died almost two months prior to his scheduled retirement.

Parliament of Canada
Preceded by James Duggan, Liberal	Senators from Newfoundland & Labrador; 1979-2005	Succeeded by Fabian Manning
