= Joe McGuire =

Canadian politician

The Honourable Joseph Blair McGuire PC

Member of Parliament for Egmont
- In office November 21, 1988 – October 14, 2008
- Preceded by: George Henderson
- Succeeded by: Gail Shea

Personal details
- Born: June 20, 1944 (age 81) Morell, Prince Edward Island, Canada
- Party: Liberal
- Spouse: Mary McGuire
- Profession: Teacher, principal

Joseph Blair McGuire, PC (born June 20, 1944) is a retired Canadian politician. A native of in Morell, Prince Edward Island, he served as the Member of Parliament (MP) for the riding of Egmont from 1988 to 2008. A member of the Liberal Party of Canada, was first elected to the House of Commons in 1988 and reelected in 1993, 1997, 2000, 2004 and 2006. From 2003 to 2006, he was Minister for the Atlantic Canada Opportunities Agency in the Cabinet of Prime Minister Paul Martin.

Before entering public life, McGuire worked as a teacher in Prince Edward Island and a vice-principal at an elementary school in Ontario. He was also a community development worker having been employed with the PEI Rural Development Council and the Community Employment Strategy. He later worked for then Egmont Member of Parliament George Henderson, as well as then Premier of Prince Edward Island, Joe Ghiz.

On March 7, 2007, McGuire announced he would not run in the next federal election, choosing to retire from politics. McGuire studied at Prince of Wales College for Teacher's Training and obtained a Bachelor of Arts at St. Dunstan's University. He and his wife, Mary, have two children, Moira and Matthew.

== Electoral record ==
2006 Canadian federal election: Egmont
Party	Candidate	Votes	%	±%	Expenditures
Liberal	Joe McGuire	10,288	53.17	-2.28	$35,567.52
Conservative	Edward Guergis	5,991	30.96	+1.87	$58,124.34
New Democratic	Regena Kaye Russell	1,847	9.55	-2.03	$3,843.89
Green	Ron Matsusaki	1,005	5.19	+1.30	$2,768.32
Independent	Michael Nesbitt	219	1.13	–	$2,449.39
Total valid votes/expense limit		19,350	100.0		$62,678
Total rejected, unmarked and declined ballots		119	0.61	-0.11	
Turnout		19,469	71.72	+4.31	
Eligible voters		27,146			
Liberal hold		Swing		-2.08	

2004 Canadian federal election: Egmont
Party	Candidate	Votes	%	±%	Expenditures
Liberal	Joe McGuire	10,220	55.44	+5.48	$35,746.29
Conservative	Reg Harper	5,363	29.09	-14.77	$32,667.92
New Democratic	Regena Kaye Russell	2,133	11.57	+5.39	$10,211.62
Green	Irené Novaczek	717	3.89	–	$1,199.66
Total valid votes/expense limit		18,433	100.0		$61,338
Total rejected, unmarked and declined ballots		134	0.72		
Turnout		18,567	67.41		
Eligible voters		27,545			
Liberal notional hold		Swing		+10.03	
Changes from 2000 are based on redistributed results. Change for the Conservatives is based on the combined totals of the Progressive Conservatives and the Canadian Alliance.

2000 Canadian federal election: Egmont
Party	Candidate	Votes	%	±%
Liberal	Joe McGuire	9,227	50.05	+1.63
Progressive Conservative	John Griffin	7,116	38.60	-5.58
New Democratic	Nancy Wallace	1,139	6.18	-1.23
Alliance	Jeff Sullivan	952	5.16	
Total valid votes		18,434	100.00	

1997 Canadian federal election: Egmont
Party	Candidate	Votes	%	±%
Liberal	Joe McGuire	8,498	48.42	-9.29
Progressive Conservative	John J. MacDonald	7,754	44.18	+6.70
New Democratic	Adelard Pitre	1,300	7.41	+2.60
Total valid votes		17,552	100.00	

1993 Canadian federal election: Egmont
Party	Candidate	Votes	%	±%
Liberal	Joe McGuire	10,547	57.71	+4.62
Progressive Conservative	Basil Stewart	6,850	37.48	-1.92
New Democratic	Basil Brian Dumville	880	4.81	-2.71
Total valid votes		18,277	100.00	

1988 Canadian federal election: Egmont
Party	Candidate	Votes	%	±%
Liberal	Joe McGuire	10,158	53.09	+3.31
Progressive Conservative	Prowse Chappell	7,538	39.40	-5.18
New Democratic	Irene N. Dyment	1,438	7.52	+1.88
Total valid votes		19,134	100.00	

27th Canadian Ministry (2003–2006) – Cabinet of Paul Martin
Cabinet post (1)
Predecessor	Office	Successor
Allan Rock	Minister for the Atlantic Canada Opportunities Agency; 2003–2006	Peter MacKay
