= Shelburne—Yarmouth =

Former federal electoral district in Nova Scotia, Canada

Nova Scotia electoral district

Defunct federal electoral district
- Legislature: House of Commons
- District created: 1924
- District abolished: 1933
- First contested: 1925
- Last contested: 1930

Demographics
- Census division(s): Shelburne, Yarmouth

Shelburne—Yarmouth was a federal electoral district in Nova Scotia, Canada, that was represented in the House of Commons of Canada from 1925 to 1935.

This riding was created in 1924 from Shelburne and Queen's and Yarmouth and Clare ridings. It consisted of the Counties of Shelburne and Yarmouth. It was abolished in 1933 when it was merged into Shelburne—Yarmouth—Clare.

== Members of Parliament ==
This riding elected the following members of Parliament:

| Parliament | Years | Member | Party |
|---|---|---|---|
Shelburne—Yarmouth; Riding created from Shelburne and Queen's and Yarmouth and Clare
| 15th | 1925–1926 | Paul Hatfield | Liberal |
| 16th | 1926–1926 | Paul Hatfield | Liberal |
| 16th | 1926–1930 | James Ralston | Liberal |
| 17th | 1930–1935 | James Ralston | Liberal |
Riding dissolved into Shelburne—Yarmouth—Clare

== Election results ==
1925 Canadian federal election
| Party | Candidate | Votes |
|---|---|---|
| Liberal | Paul Lacombe Hatfield | 6,709 |
| Conservative | Edgar Keith Spinney | 6,327 |

1926 Canadian federal election
| Party | Candidate | Votes |
|---|---|---|
| Liberal | Paul Lacombe Hatfield | 7,339 |
| Conservative | Frank Harris Patterson | 6,008 |

By-election: On Mr. Hatfield being called to the Senate, 6 October 1926

By-election on 2 November 1926
| Party | Candidate | Votes |
| Liberal | James Layton Ralston | acclaimed |

1930 Canadian federal election
| Party | Candidate | Votes |
|---|---|---|
| Liberal | James Layton Ralston | 8,173 |
| Conservative | James Marvin Walker | 6,800 |

== See also ==
- List of Canadian electoral districts
- Historical federal electoral districts of Canada
