= Paul Hatfield =

Paul Hatfield is the name of:

- Paul Hatfield (Canadian politician) (1873–1935), Canadian politician, member of both Parliament and Senate
- Paul G. Hatfield (1928–2000), American judge and Montana senator
