= James Ralston =

Canadian politician

Colonel The Honourable J. L. Ralston PC CMG DSO & Bar KC
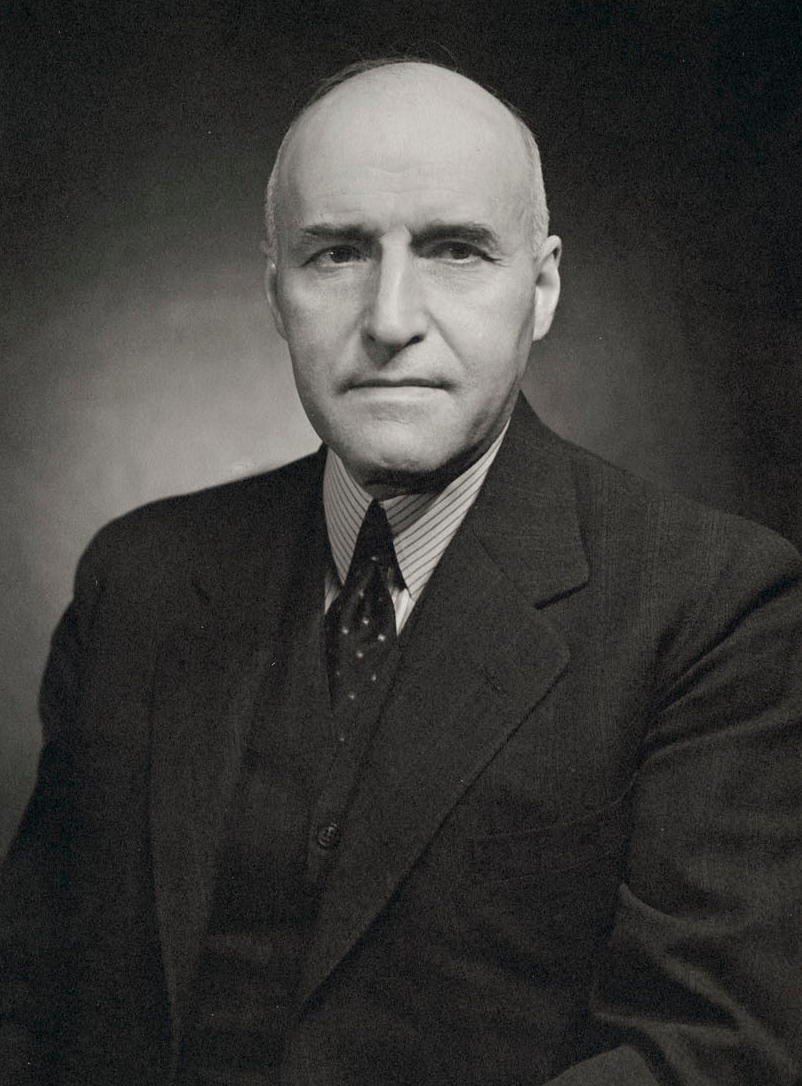

4th Minister of National Defence
- In office July 5, 1940 – November 1, 1944
- Prime Minister: W. L. Mackenzie King
- Preceded by: Charles Power
- Succeeded by: Andrew McNaughton
- In office October 8, 1926 – August 6, 1930
- Prime Minister: W. L. Mackenzie King
- Preceded by: James Robb
- Succeeded by: Donald Matheson Sutherland

Minister of Finance
- In office September 6, 1939 – July 4, 1940
- Prime Minister: W. L. Mackenzie King
- Preceded by: Charles Avery Dunning
- Succeeded by: James Lorimer Ilsley

Minister of Pensions and National Health
- In office June 19, 1930 – August 6, 1930
- Prime Minister: W. L. Mackenzie King
- Preceded by: James King
- Succeeded by: Murray MacLaren

Member of Parliament for Prince
- In office January 2, 1940 – June 10, 1945
- Preceded by: Alfred Edgar MacLean
- Succeeded by: John Watson MacNaught

Member of Parliament for Shelburne—Yarmouth
- In office November 2, 1926 – October 13, 1935
- Preceded by: Paul Hatfield
- Succeeded by: Riding merged into Shelburne—Yarmouth—Clare

MLA for Cumberland
- In office June 14, 1911 – July 26, 1920
- Preceded by: Joshua H. Livingstone
- Succeeded by: Archibald Terris

Personal details
- Born: September 27, 1881 Amherst, Nova Scotia, Canada
- Died: May 22, 1948 (aged 66) Montreal, Quebec, Canada
- Party: Liberal

Military service
- Allegiance: Canada
- Branch/service: Canadian Expeditionary Force
- Years of service: 1916-1924
- Rank: Colonel
- Unit: 85th Battalion (Nova Scotia Highlanders), CEF
- Battles/wars: World War I

James Layton Ralston PC, CMG, DSO & Bar, KC (September 27, 1881 – May 22, 1948) was a Canadian lawyer, soldier, and politician. A Nova Scotian and a lawyer by training, Ralston fought with distinction during the First World War and pursued a career in the Canadian Army, before becoming a Liberal Member of Parliament. During the Second World War, he served as Minister of National Defence from 1940 to 1944, when he was forced to resign by Prime Minister William Lyon Mackenzie King because of his support for the introduction of conscription.

== Early life and provincial politics ==
Ralston was born in Amherst, Nova Scotia, the eldest son (he had three brothers) of Burnett William Ralston, a prominent local businessman who served a term as the town's mayor. Known as Layton within the family, Ralston was educated at Amherst Academy and the law school at Dalhousie University. He then became a partner in his uncle's law firm in 1903 and practised law in Amherst.

Ralston was the Liberal candidate for Cumberland in the 1908 federal election, hoping to succeed to his uncle, Hance James Logan; but was defeated. He subsequently entered public life when he ran as the provincial Liberal candidate for Cumberland and was elected in the 1911 provincial election. He was re-elected in 1916.

In 1912, seeking greater opportunities, Ralston moved to Halifax, joining his friend Charles Burchell and A.K. Maclean, MP to form one of the city's main law firms.

== Military service ==
In his 30s at the outbreak of the First World War and lacking military experience, Ralston agonized about joining the Army. After training with the Canadian Officers’ Training Corps, he volunteered for military service overseas in 1915, following the lead of his brother Ivan. Joining the 85th Battalion (Nova Scotia Highlanders), he was involved in recruitment and became the battalion's adjutant in 1916.

Along with the 85th, Ralston went to England in 1916 and to France in 1917, where he distinguished himself in combat. In 1917, he was wounded at Éleu-dit-Leauwette, received the Distinguished Service Order and was mentioned in despatches. In 1918, he assumed command of the 85th and was promoted to lieutenant-colonel. The same year, Ralston was recommended for the Victoria Cross after rescuing a subaltern under fire. The recommendation was turned down by higher authority, since as the unit's commanding officer he should not have been risking his life that way.

He was wounded again in August 1918, this time by a sniper, at the Battle of Amiens, in which his brother Ivan, who was his second-in-command, was killed. In a letter to his parents, Ralston said that "The sun has gone out of life in an instant".

Returning to the front, Ralston was wounded again on 1 October, at the Battle of the Canal du Nord. For his part in the battle, he received a bar to his DSO. In later October, he was wounded a fourth time. The wound having infected, he was operated on twice, and the time he spent in hospital meant that he did not take part in the Hundred Days Offensive.

After the Armistice, Ralston briefly served as an acting brigade commander in Belgium. That year, he was appointed a Companion of the Order of St Michael and St George and was mentioned in despatches again. In 1919, he attended the Paris Peace Conference as a guest of General Sir Arthur Currie. After serving on some of the courts-martial convened after the Kinmel Park mutiny in April 1919, he led his unit back to Canada in June 1919. He was promoted to colonel in 1924.

Ralston's military service marked him deeply, and he was unrelenting in his defence of veterans' rights after the war's end. As the chairman of the Royal Commission on Pensions and Re-establishment from 1922 to 1924, he crossed the country to hear veterans' submissions. His war service may also have influenced his views during the Conscription Crisis of 1944 later in his career.

== Federal politics ==
After the war, Ralston returned to civilian life. He lost his provincial seat in the 1920 election, then tried unsuccessfully to enter federal politics as the Liberal candidate for Halifax in the 1926 federal election. Despite his loss, Ralston was appointed to the cabinet by Prime Minister William Lyon Mackenzie King and became the Minister of National Defence on October 8. Prime Minister King created a seat for Ralston by appointing the MP for Shelburne—Yarmouth, Paul Lacombe Hatfield, to the Senate, thus opening the riding for a by-election. Ralston won by acclamation on November 2, 1926, entering the 16th Parliament.

Ralston served as Minister of National Defence until the defeat of King's government in the 1930 federal election but was re-elected and remained the MP for Shelburne-Yarmouth through the 17th Parliament, serving in His Majesty's Loyal Opposition. In 1930, he moved to Montreal to join a law firm there, Mitchell, Ralston, Kearney and Duquet.

The riding of Shelburne-Yarmouth was consolidated into the new riding of Shelburne—Yarmouth—Clare in 1935 and Ralston opted to not run again, returning to the legal profession full-time, despite the Liberal party regaining power and Mackenzie King's entreaties, going so far as to refuse a seat in the Senate in 1937. Ralston was appointed the Canadian delegate to the London Naval Conference 1935 that December, and he later sat on several Royal Commissions.

=== Second World War ===
Germany invaded Poland on September 1, 1939 and Canada's entry into World War II was seen as inevitable. The ensuing international crisis saw Prime Minister King court Ralston's military and cabinet experience. Having promised Mackenzie King in August 1939 that he would return to government service if war broke out, Ralston re-entered public service and he was subsequently appointed as Minister of Finance on September 6, 1939, replacing Charles Dunning who resigned because of ill-health.

Canada declared war on Nazi Germany on September 10 and Ralston participated in the King government's revamping of Canada's two-decade-long neglected military. The death of Alfred Edgar MacLean, MP for Prince on October 28 opened up the opportunity for Prime Minister King to call a by-election in a Liberal-friendly riding that Ralston could run in. Ralston was subsequently elected by acclamation on January 2, 1940 and entered the 18th Parliament. He was re-elected several months later on March 26 and continued into the 19th Parliament. In the political tradition of the era, as a federal minister, Ralston brought government patronage to the impoverished rural riding in Prince Edward Island, largely through military spending.

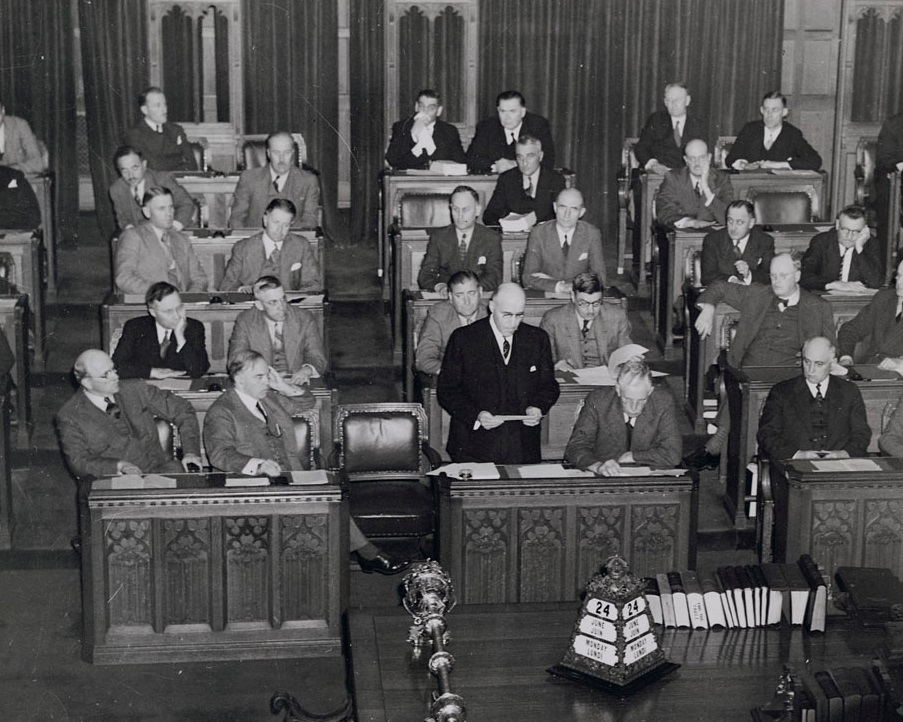
Ralston speaking in the House of Commons.

On June 10, 1940 the Minister of National Defence, Norman Rogers, was killed when his airplane crashed in Ontario. King subsequently shuffled the cabinet and gave Ralston the National Defence portfolio on July 5. Despite not being from Prince Edward Island, Ralston continued his support to that province as political minister by authorizing the establishment of RCAF Station Mount Pleasant, RCAF Station Summerside (both in his riding) and RCAF Station Charlottetown, as well as a radar station in Tignish (also in his riding).

=== Conscription Crisis ===
Ralston supported conscription for overseas service during the Second World War, just as he did during the First World War. In 1942 offered to resign when prime minister William Lyon Mackenzie King's government refused to send "Zombies", men mobilized under the National Resources Mobilization Act, to the front. King refused Ralston's resignation, and the resignation issue was dropped.

In 1944, the issue of conscription returned again to the public debate. Ralston decided to personally investigate the issue by visiting Northwest Europe and Italy. He reported to Cabinet that the situation was far worse than he had been led to believe; front-line infantry regiments were so short of manpower that wounded men were being pulled out of hospitals and sent back to the front lines. In order to continue combat operations, the overseas Canadian Army needed 15,000 new infantrymen immediately, and that the only way to get these replacements was to draw from the 60,000 Zombies assigned to defend the coasts.

King was convinced that there was a plot to "get me out" and that Ralston had provoked the crisis to make himself Prime Minister. When the Cabinet met on the morning of 1 November 1944, King, who had only informed his Quebec lieutenant Louis St. Laurent in advance, suddenly announced that he now accepted Ralston's resignation, which had been submitted back in April 1942, effective firing him. To King's relief, Ralston walked out of the cabinet room and no one followed him. Ralston's ally, Navy Minister Angus Macdonald, ripped pieces of paper in frustration, but remained seated with the rest of the cabinet. He was replaced by Lieutenant-General Andrew McNaughton, who was opposed to sending the Zombies overseas. One of McNaughton's first actions was to dismiss Lieutenant-General Kenneth Stuart, the Chief of the General Staff and Ralston's ally in pressing for conscription.

Historians Jack Granatstein and Desmond Morton noted that "news of Ralston's sacking put the conscription crisis on the front pages in screaming headlines. To King's horror and to McNaughton's distress, the publicity created a firestorm of reaction against the once-popular general. Audiences booed and jeered when he tried to rally the country behind the no-conscription policy".

Ralston left politics the following year and died in Montreal in 1948.

== Family ==
In 1907, Ralston married Nettie McLeod, also from Amherst, whom he had known since childhood. They had one son, Stuart, born in 1908. Stuart Ralston later became a puisne judge of the Superior Court of Quebec.

== Legacy ==
Ralston was named a National Historic Person in 1973.

The Colonel James Layton Ralston Armoury in Amherst, Nova Scotia is named in his honour and is the historic home of the Nova Scotia Highlanders Regiment.

A large tern schooner was named in his honour in 1919 at Eatonville, Nova Scotia. Ralston, Alberta and the Ralston Residence at the Canadian Forces College in Toronto was completed in October 1999, and was named after him.

He was portrayed by actor Sandy Webster in the 1986 television miniseries The King Chronicle.

== Archives ==
There is a John Layton Ralston fonds at Library and Archives Canada.
