= Alexander Baird =

Alex Baird or Alexander Baird may refer to:

- Sir Alexander Baird, 1st Baronet (1849–1920), Lord-Lieutenant of Kincardineshire and philanthropist in Egypt
- Alexander Boyd Baird (1891–1967), Canadian Senator
- Alex Baird (footballer), played in 2012–13 Dundee F.C. season
- Alex Baird, drummer in The Jags
