= Egmont (electoral district) =

Federal electoral district in Prince Edward Island, Canada

Prince Edward Island electoral district
- Interactive map of riding boundaries from the 2025 federal election
- Coordinates: 46.611°N 64.007°W

Federal electoral district
- Legislature: House of Commons
MP
Bobby Morrissey
Liberal
- District created: 1966
- First contested: 1968
- Last contested: 2025
- District webpage: profile, map

Demographics
- Population (2021): 35,925
- Electors (2025): 30,952
- Area (km²): 1,527
- Pop. density (per km²): 23.5
- Census division: Prince
- Census subdivision(s): Summerside, Alberton, Central Prince, Miscouche, O'Leary, Tignish, Lot 11 and Area, Abram-Village, Wellington, Linkletter

Egmont is a federal electoral district in Prince Edward Island, Canada, that has been represented in the House of Commons of Canada since 1968. Its population in 2021 was 35,925.

== Demographics ==
Ethnic groups: 98.0% White, 1.4% Native Canadian
Languages: 87.9% English, 10.9% French
Religions: 54.1% Catholic, 38.4% Protestant, 1.8% Other Christian, 5.5% no affiliation
Average income: $22,065

According to the 2016 Canadian census

- Languages: (2016) 89.6% English, 8.7% French, 0.4% Tagalog, 0.1% Arabic, 0.1% Spanish, 0.1% German, 0.1% Albanian, 0.1% Mandarin, 0.1% Vietnamese, 0.1% Cantonese, 0.1% Dutch

== Geography ==
The district includes the part of Prince County located in Summerside and west of Summerside. Communities include Summerside, Sherbrooke, Miscouche, Wellington, O'Leary, Alberton, and Tignish.

== History ==
The electoral district was created in 1966 from Prince riding. There were no boundary changes as a result of the 2012 federal electoral redistribution.

Following the 2022 Canadian federal electoral redistribution, the riding gained the Bedeque area plus some areas east and southeast of Summerside from Malpeque. These changes came into effect following the calling of the 2025 Canadian federal election.

=== Members of Parliament ===
This riding has elected the following members of Parliament:

Parliament	Years	Member	Party
Egmont; Riding created from Prince
28th	1968–1972	David MacDonald	Progressive Conservative
29th	1972–1974	David MacDonald	Progressive Conservative
30th	1974–1979	David MacDonald	Progressive Conservative
31st	1979–1980	David MacDonald	Progressive Conservative
32nd	1980–1984	George Henderson	Liberal
33rd	1984–1988	George Henderson	Liberal
34th	1988–1993	Joe McGuire	Liberal
35th	1993–1997	Joe McGuire	Liberal
36th	1997–2000	Joe McGuire	Liberal
37th	2000–2004	Joe McGuire	Liberal
38th	2004–2006	Joe McGuire	Liberal
39th	2006–2008	Joe McGuire	Liberal
40th	2008–2011	Gail Shea	Conservative
41st	2011–2015	Gail Shea	Conservative
42nd	2015–2019	Bobby Morrissey	Liberal
43rd	2019–2021	Bobby Morrissey	Liberal
44th	2021–2025	Bobby Morrissey	Liberal
45th	2025–present	Bobby Morrissey	Liberal

== Election results ==
=== 2025 ===
2025 Canadian federal election
Party	Candidate	Votes	%	±%	Expenditures
Liberal	Bobby Morrissey	12,466	51.92	+5.98	
Conservative	Logan McLellan	10,419	43.40	+12.36	
New Democratic	Carol Rybinski	585	2.44	−6.21	
Green	Ranald MacFarlane	538	2.24	−7.17	
Total valid votes/expense limit		24,008	99.01		
Total rejected ballots		241	0.99		
Turnout		24,249	77.86		
Eligible voters		31,145			
Liberal notional hold		Swing		−3.19	
Source: Elections Canada
Note: number of eligible voters does not include voting day registrations.

=== 2021 ===
2021 federal election redistributed results
Party	Vote	%
Liberal	9,506	45.94
Conservative	6,422	31.04
Green	1,948	9.41
New Democratic	1,790	8.65
People's	1,026	4.96

2021 Canadian federal election
Party	Candidate	Votes	%	±%	Expenditures
Liberal	Bobby Morrissey	9,040	46.21	+6.49	$52,360.87
Conservative	Barry Balsom	6,088	31.12	-3.24	$45,649.91
Green	Alex Clark	1,771	9.05	-10.76	$5,606.29
New Democratic	Lisa Bradshaw	1,688	8.63	+2.53	$3,620.46
People's	Wayne Biggar	974	4.98	–	$0.00
Total valid votes/expense limit		19,561	98.77		$89,655.36
Total rejected ballots		244	1.23	-0.11	
Turnout		19,805	68.94	-2.68	
Eligible voters		28,729			
Liberal hold		Swing		+4.86	
Source: Elections Canada

=== 2019 ===
2019 Canadian federal election
Party	Candidate	Votes	%	±%	Expenditures
Liberal	Bobby Morrissey	8,016	39.73	−9.52	$53,702.84
Conservative	Logan McLellan	6,934	34.36	+5.41	$65,608.31
Green	Alex Clark	3,998	19.81	+17.20	$14,320.88
New Democratic	Sharon Dunn	1,230	6.10	−13.08	$0.00
Total valid votes/expense limit		20,178	98.66		$85,525.15
Total rejected ballots		274	1.34	+0.93	
Turnout		20,452	71.62	−5.37	
Eligible voters		28,557			
Liberal hold		Swing		−7.46	
Source: Elections Canada

=== 2015 ===
2015 Canadian federal election
Party	Candidate	Votes	%	±%	Expenditures
Liberal	Bobby Morrissey	10,521	49.25	+17.94	$67,240.83
Conservative	Gail Shea	6,185	28.95	–25.70	$110,058.32
New Democratic	Herb Dickieson	4,097	19.18	+6.81	$34,718.49
Green	Nils Ling	559	2.62	+0.95	$4,895.27
Total valid votes/expense limit		21,362	99.59		$169,928.60
Total rejected ballots		87	0.41	–0.39	
Turnout		21,449	77.29	+5.62	
Eligible voters		27,751			
Liberal gain from Conservative		Swing		+21.82	
Source: Elections Canada

=== 2011 ===
2011 Canadian federal election
Party	Candidate	Votes	%	±%	Expenditures
Conservative	Gail Shea	10,467	54.65	+10.72	$57,565.04
Liberal	Guy Gallant	5,997	31.31	-12.32	$34,428.58
New Democratic	Jacquie Robichaud	2,369	12.37	+3.32	$1,780.97
Green	Carl Anthony	320	1.67	-1.72	$250.00
Total valid votes/expense limit		19,153	100.0		$69,831.16
Total rejected, unmarked and declined ballots		155	0.80	+0.18	
Turnout		19,308	71.67	+3.52	
Eligible voters		26,941			
Conservative hold		Swing		+11.52	

=== 2008 ===
2008 Canadian federal election
Party	Candidate	Votes	%	±%	Expenditures
Conservative	Gail Shea	8,110	43.93	+12.97	$51,795.67
Liberal	Keith Milligan	8,055	43.63	-9.54	$45,007.86
New Democratic	Orville Lewis	1,670	9.05	-0.50	$2,245.18
Green	Rebecca Ridlington	626	3.39	-1.80	$2,678.98
Total valid votes/expense limit		18,461	100.0		$67,686
Total rejected, unmarked and declined ballots		115	0.62	+0.01	
Turnout		18,576	68.15	-3.57	
Eligible voters		27,256			
Conservative gain from Liberal		Swing		+11.26	

=== 2006 ===
2006 Canadian federal election
Party	Candidate	Votes	%	±%	Expenditures
Liberal	Joe McGuire	10,288	53.17	-2.28	$35,567.52
Conservative	Edward Guergis	5,991	30.96	+1.87	$58,124.34
New Democratic	Regena Kaye Russell	1,847	9.55	-2.03	$3,843.89
Green	Ron Matsusaki	1,005	5.19	+1.30	$2,768.32
Independent	Michael Nesbitt	219	1.13	–	$2,449.39
Total valid votes/expense limit		19,350	100.0		$62,678
Total rejected, unmarked and declined ballots		119	0.61	-0.11	
Turnout		19,469	71.72	+4.31	
Eligible voters		27,146			
Liberal hold		Swing		-2.08	

=== 2004 ===
2004 Canadian federal election
Party	Candidate	Votes	%	±%	Expenditures
Liberal	Joe McGuire	10,220	55.44	+5.48	$35,746.29
Conservative	Reg Harper	5,363	29.09	-14.77	$32,667.92
New Democratic	Regena Kaye Russell	2,133	11.57	+5.39	$10,211.62
Green	Irené Novaczek	717	3.89	–	$1,199.66
Total valid votes/expense limit		18,433	100.0		$61,338
Total rejected, unmarked and declined ballots		134	0.72		
Turnout		18,567	67.41		
Eligible voters		27,545			
Liberal notional hold		Swing		+10.03	
Changes from 2000 are based on redistributed results. Change for the Conservatives is based on the combined totals of the Progressive Conservatives and the Canadian Alliance.

2000 federal election redistributed results
Party	Vote	%
Liberal	8,999	49.96
Progressive Conservative	6,994	38.83
New Democratic	1,114	6.18
Alliance	907	5.03

=== 2000 ===
2000 Canadian federal election
Party	Candidate	Votes	%	±%
Liberal	Joe McGuire	9,227	50.05	+1.63
Progressive Conservative	John Griffin	7,116	38.60	-5.58
New Democratic	Nancy Wallace	1,139	6.18	-1.23
Alliance	Jeff Sullivan	952	5.16	
Total valid votes		18,434	100.00	

=== 1997 ===
1997 Canadian federal election
Party	Candidate	Votes	%	±%
Liberal	Joe McGuire	8,498	48.42	-9.29
Progressive Conservative	John J. MacDonald	7,754	44.18	+6.70
New Democratic	Adelard Pitre	1,300	7.41	+2.60
Total valid votes		17,552	100.00	

=== 1993 ===
1993 Canadian federal election
Party	Candidate	Votes	%	±%
Liberal	Joe McGuire	10,547	57.71	+4.62
Progressive Conservative	Basil Stewart	6,850	37.48	-1.92
New Democratic	Basil Brian Dumville	880	4.81	-2.71
Total valid votes		18,277	100.00	

=== 1988 ===
1988 Canadian federal election
Party	Candidate	Votes	%	±%
Liberal	Joe McGuire	10,158	53.09	+3.31
Progressive Conservative	Prowse Chappell	7,538	39.40	-5.18
New Democratic	Irene N. Dyment	1,438	7.52	+1.88
Total valid votes		19,134	100.00	

=== 1984 ===
1984 Canadian federal election
Party	Candidate	Votes	%	±%
Liberal	George Henderson	8,777	49.78	-2.59
Progressive Conservative	George Dewar	7,859	44.58	+1.95
New Democratic	Wain Munro	994	5.64	+0.64
Total valid votes		17,630	100.00	

=== 1980 ===
1980 Canadian federal election
Party	Candidate	Votes	%	±%
Liberal	George Henderson	8,639	52.37	+12.93
Progressive Conservative	David MacDonald	7,033	42.63	-13.44
New Democratic	Vincent Gallant	824	5.00	+0.51
Total valid votes		16,496	100.00	
Source(s) "Egmont, Prince Edward Island (1968-04-23 - )". History of Federal Ridings Since 1867. Library of Parliament.

=== 1979 ===
1979 Canadian federal election
Party	Candidate	Votes	%	±%
Progressive Conservative	David MacDonald	8,861	56.07	+3.82
Liberal	Bill Reese	6,233	39.44	-4.81
New Democratic	Vincent Gallant	710	4.49	+0.98
Total valid votes		15,804	100.00	

=== 1974 ===
1974 Canadian federal election
Party	Candidate	Votes	%	±%
Progressive Conservative	David MacDonald	7,583	52.25	-3.53
Liberal	Bill Reese	6,422	44.25	+3.97
New Democratic	Cletus Shea	509	3.51	-0.04
Total valid votes		14,514	100.00	
canadianelectionsdatabase.ca and lop.parl.ca

=== 1972 ===
1972 Canadian federal election
Party	Candidate	Votes	%	±%
Progressive Conservative	David MacDonald	7,868	55.78	+2.26
Liberal	George W. Olscamp	5,681	40.28	-4.02
New Democratic	Carroll L. Kadey	501	3.55	+1.37
Social Credit	Hugh G. Ryan	55	0.39	
Total valid votes		14,105	100.00	

=== 1968 ===
1968 Canadian federal election
Party	Candidate	Votes	%
Progressive Conservative	David MacDonald	7,182	53.52
Liberal	J. Melville Campbell	5,945	44.30
New Democratic	Harvey Dawson	292	2.18
Total valid votes		13,419	100.00

== Student vote results ==
=== 2011 ===
In 2011, a student vote was conducted at participating Canadian schools to parallel the 2011 Canadian federal election results. The vote was designed to educate students and simulate the electoral process for persons who have not yet reached the legal majority. Schools with a large student body that reside in another electoral district had the option to vote for candidates outside of the electoral district then where they were physically located.

2011 Canadian federal election
Party	Candidate	Votes	%
Conservative	Gail Shea	475	29.87
Liberal	Guy Gallant	407	25.60
Green	Carl Anthony	391	24.59
New Democratic	Jacquie Robichaud	317	19.94
Total valid votes		1,590	100.00

== See also ==
- List of Canadian electoral districts
- Historical federal electoral districts of Canada
