= Prince (electoral district) =

Former federal electoral district in Prince Edward Island, Canada

Prince Edward Island electoral district

Defunct federal electoral district
- Legislature: House of Commons
- District created: 1903
- District abolished: 1966
- First contested: 1904
- Last contested: 1965

Prince was a federal electoral district in Prince Edward Island, Canada, that was represented in the House of Commons of Canada from 1904 to 1968.

== History ==
This riding was created in 1903 from parts of East Prince and West Prince ridings. It was abolished in 1966 when it was redistributed into Egmont and Malpeque ridings.

It consisted of the County of Prince.

== Members of Parliament ==
Parliament	Years	Member	Party
Prince
10th	1904–1908	Alfred Lefurgey	Conservative
11th	1908–1911	James William Richards	Liberal
12th	1911–1917	James William Richards	Liberal
13th	1917–1919	Joseph Read	Opposition (Laurier Liberals)
13th	1919–1921	William Lyon Mackenzie King	Liberal
14th	1921–1925	Alfred Edgar MacLean	Liberal
15th	1925–1926	Alfred Edgar MacLean	Liberal
16th	1926–1930	Alfred Edgar MacLean	Liberal
17th	1930–1935	Alfred Edgar MacLean	Liberal
18th	1935–1939	Alfred Edgar MacLean	Liberal
18th	1940–1940	James Layton Ralston	Liberal
19th	1940–1945	James Layton Ralston	Liberal
20th	1945–1949	John Watson MacNaught	Liberal
21st	1949–1953	John Watson MacNaught	Liberal
22nd	1953–1957	John Watson MacNaught	Liberal
23rd	1957–1958	Orville Howard Phillips	Progressive Conservative
24th	1958–1962	Orville Howard Phillips	Progressive Conservative
25th	1962–1963	Orville Howard Phillips	Progressive Conservative
26th	1963–1965	John Watson MacNaught	Liberal
27th	1965–1968	David MacDonald	Progressive Conservative

== Election results ==
1904 Canadian federal election
Party	Candidate	Votes
Conservative	Alfred Lefurgey	3,501
Liberal	James William Richards	3,408

1908 Canadian federal election
Party	Candidate	Votes
Liberal	James William Richards	3,520
Conservative	Alfred Lefurgey	3,356

1911 Canadian federal election
Party	Candidate	Votes
Liberal	James William Richards	3,529
Conservative	Patrick Charles Murphy	3,414

1917 Canadian federal election
Party	Candidate	Votes
Opposition (Laurier Liberals)	Joseph Read	4,298
Government (Unionist)	Alfred Lefurgey	3,974

Canadian federal by-election, October 20, 1919 Federal by-election following Joseph Reed's death on April 6, 1919
Party	Candidate	Votes	Elected
Liberal	William Lyon Mackenzie King	acclaimed	✓
Total valid votes		-	-
Source(s) "Prince, Prince Edward Island (1904-09-20 - 1968-04-22)". History of Federal Ridings Since 1867. Library of Parliament.

1921 Canadian federal election
Party	Candidate	Votes
Liberal	Alfred Edgar MacLean	5,930
Conservative	James A. McNeil	4,671
Progressive	Horace Wright	2,693

1925 Canadian federal election
Party	Candidate	Votes
Liberal	Alfred Edgar MacLean	6,692
Conservative	G. Shelton Sharp	5,167

1926 Canadian federal election
Party	Candidate	Votes
Liberal	Alfred Edgar MacLean	7,362
Conservative	J. Edward Wyatt	5,641

1930 Canadian federal election
Party	Candidate	Votes
Liberal	Alfred Edgar MacLean	8,058
Conservative	J. Frank Arnett	6,485

1935 Canadian federal election
Party	Candidate	Votes
Liberal	Alfred Edgar MacLean	9,233
Conservative	J. Frank Arnett	5,063

By-election on 2 January 1940 MacLean's death, 28 October 1939
Party	Candidate	Votes
Liberal	James Layton Ralston	acclaimed

1940 Canadian federal election
Party	Candidate	Votes
Liberal	James Layton Ralston	8,745
National Government	John Adolphus MacPhee	5,767

1945 Canadian federal election
Party	Candidate	Votes
Liberal	John Watson MacNaught	7,346
Progressive Conservative	Ernest H. Strong	7,277
Co-operative Commonwealth	Cyrus F. Gallant	911

1949 Canadian federal election
Party	Candidate	Votes
Liberal	John Watson MacNaught	8,007
Progressive Conservative	John H. Price	7,834
Co-operative Commonwealth	Donald Maclean	1,182

1953 Canadian federal election
Party	Candidate	Votes
Liberal	John Watson MacNaught	8,782
Progressive Conservative	John H. Price	7,431
Co-operative Commonwealth	James Harrison MacFarlane	552

1957 Canadian federal election
Party	Candidate	Votes
Progressive Conservative	Orville Howard Phillips	8,119
Liberal	John Watson MacNaught	7,885
Co-operative Commonwealth	Muriel Alice Macinnis	339

1958 Canadian federal election
Party	Candidate	Votes
Progressive Conservative	Orville Howard Phillips	10,444
Liberal	John Watson MacNaught	6,636
Co-operative Commonwealth	Cyrus F. Gallant	215

1962 Canadian federal election
Party	Candidate	Votes
Progressive Conservative	Orville Howard Phillips	9,133
Liberal	J. George Mackay	8,492
New Democratic	Arnold Wood	735
Social Credit	R.L. Mackillop	153

1963 Canadian federal election
Party	Candidate	Votes
Liberal	John Watson MacNaught	8,967
Progressive Conservative	Lorne Monkley	8,387
New Democratic	Gregory Mcinnis	247

1965 Canadian federal election
Party	Candidate	Votes
Progressive Conservative	David MacDonald	9,082
Liberal	John Watson MacNaught	8,312
New Democratic	Harvey Dawson	384

== See also ==
- List of Canadian electoral districts
- Historical federal electoral districts of Canada
