= Yarmouth and Clare =

Former federal electoral district in Nova Scotia, Canada

Nova Scotia electoral district

Defunct federal electoral district
- Legislature: House of Commons
- District created: 1914
- District abolished: 1924
- First contested: 1917
- Last contested: 1921

Yarmouth and Clare was a federal electoral district in Nova Scotia, Canada, that was represented in the House of Commons of Canada from 1917 to 1925. This riding was created in 1914 from Digby and Yarmouth ridings. It consisted of the County of Yarmouth and the municipality of Clare. It was abolished in 1924 when it was redistributed into Digby and Annapolis and Shelburne—Yarmouth ridings.

== Members of Parliament ==
This riding elected the following members of Parliament:

Parliament	Years	Member	Party
Yarmouth and Clare; Riding created from Digby and Yarmouth
13th	1917–1921	Edgar Keith Spinney	Government (Unionist)
14th	1921–1925	Paul Hatfield	Liberal
Riding dissolved into Digby and Annapolis and Shelburne—Yarmouth

== Election results ==
1917 Canadian federal election
Party	Candidate	Votes
Government (Unionist)	Hon. Edgar Keith Spinney	4,463
Opposition (Laurier Liberals)	Joseph Willie Comeau	3,447

1921 Canadian federal election
Party	Candidate	Votes
Liberal	Paul LaCombe Hatfield	7,165
Conservative	Hon. Edgar Keith Spinney	5,608

== See also ==
- List of Canadian electoral districts
- Historical federal electoral districts of Canada
