= David MacDonald (Canadian politician) =

United Church of Canada minister, Canadian politician and author

The Honourable David MacDonald PC
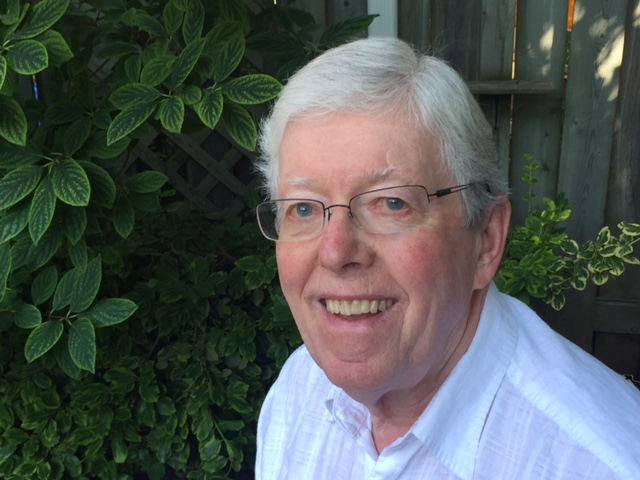
- MacDonald in September 2016

Secretary of State for Canada
- In office June 4, 1979 – March 2, 1980
- Prime Minister: Joe Clark
- Preceded by: John Roberts
- Succeeded by: Francis Fox

Minister of Communications
- In office June 4, 1979 – March 2, 1980
- Prime Minister: Joe Clark
- Preceded by: Jeanne Sauvé
- Succeeded by: Francis Fox

Minister responsible for the Status of Women
- In office June 4, 1979 – March 2, 1980
- Prime Minister: Joe Clark
- Preceded by: Marc Lalonde
- Succeeded by: Lloyd Axworthy

Member of Parliament for Rosedale
- In office November 21, 1988 – October 25, 1993
- Preceded by: David Crombie
- Succeeded by: Bill Graham

Member of Parliament for Egmont (Prince; 1965–1968)
- In office November 8, 1965 – February 18, 1980
- Preceded by: John Watson MacNaught
- Succeeded by: George Henderson

Personal details
- Born: David Samuel Horne MacDonald; August 20, 1936 (age 89) Charlottetown, Prince Edward Island, Canada
- Party: New Democratic (1996–present)
- Other political affiliations: Progressive Conservative (until 1996)
- Spouses: Sandrabelle Rogers (m. 1964–1997) Deborah Sinclair (m. 2005)
- Domestic partner: Alexa McDonough (1997-2004)
- Occupation: United Church minister, politician

David Samuel Horne MacDonald PC (born August 20, 1936) is a Canadian United Church of Canada minister, former politician, and author.

== Early life ==
Born in Charlottetown, Prince Edward Island, David MacDonald was ordained in the United Church by the Maritime Conference on June 11, 1961, and was a minister at Alberton, Tignish, and Cascumpec, Prince Edward Island before going into federal politics.

== Political career ==
He was first elected to the House of Commons of Canada as a Progressive Conservative Member of Parliament (MP) from the former Prince Edward Island riding of Prince in the 1965 election, and was re-elected in the realigned Egmont riding from 1968 until 1979.

After the Tory victory in the 1979 election, he was appointed Minister of Communications, Minister responsible for the Status of Women and Secretary of State for Canada in the short-lived Cabinet of Prime Minister Joe Clark.

MacDonald lost his seat to Liberal George Henderson in the 1980 election but returned to the House as MP in the Toronto riding of Rosedale in the 1988 election, replacing former Toronto Mayor and PC incumbent David Crombie.

However, he lost his seat again to a Liberal majority government in the 1993 election, this time to Bill Graham. Two other notable candidates ran against MacDonald in this election: future New Democratic Party (NDP) leader Jack Layton, and magician Doug Henning for the Natural Law Party of Canada.

MacDonald also spent time in Africa between parliamentary duties.

MacDonald had a reputation as a Red Tory and subsequently switched his political allegiance to the social democratic New Democratic Party of Canada. He ran as the NDP candidate in his old riding (now called Toronto Centre-Rosedale) in the 1997 election, but was defeated again by Graham.

== After politics ==
On November 25, 1998, The United Church of Canada appointed MacDonald a Special Advisor on residential schools, in light of major lawsuits against the UCC from former students.

== Personal life ==
MacDonald was romantically involved with Alexa McDonough who at the time was leader of the federal NDP, prior to his 1997 candidacy. However, they split up prior to the 2004 federal election. MacDonald has since started another relationship and married.

== Electoral record ==
=== Toronto Centre—Rosedale ===
1997 Canadian federal election
Party	Candidate	Votes	%	±%
Liberal	Bill Graham	22,945	49.19	-0.80
New Democratic	David MacDonald	9,597	20.58	+9.80
Progressive Conservative	Stephen Probyn	8,993	19.28	-1.96
Reform	John Stewart	3,646	7.82	-4.65
Green	Jim Harris	577	1.24	+0.30
Canadian Action	Anthony Robert Pedrette	303	0.65	
Natural Law	Ron Parker	270	0.58	-1.01
Marxist–Leninist	Steve Rutchinski	166	0.36	+0.25
Independent	Ted W. Culp	145	0.31	
Total valid votes		46,642	100.00	

=== Rosedale ===
1993 Canadian federal election: Rosedale
Party	Candidate	Votes	%	±%	Expenditures
Liberal	Bill Graham	27,707	49.98	–	$54,087
Progressive Conservative	David MacDonald	12,018	21.68		$60,961
Reform	Daniel Jovkovic	7,048	12.71		$25,016
New Democratic Party	Jack Layton	5,937	10.71		$44,872
National	Martin Lanigan	1,091	1.97		$6,964
Natural Law	Doug Henning	839	1.51		$37,086
Green	Leslie Hunter	479	0.86		$380
N/A (Christian Freedom)	Linda Dale Gibbons	214	0.39		$200
Marxist-Leninist	Steve Rutchinski	61	0.11		$205
Abolitionist	Y. Patrice d'Audibert-Garcien	43	0.08		$0
Total valid votes		55,437	100.00		
Total rejected ballots		491			
Turnout		55,928	61.71		
Electors on the lists		90,630			
Source: Thirty-fifth General Election, 1993: Official Voting Results, Published by the Chief Electoral Officer of Canada. Financial figures taken from official contributions and expenses provided by Elections Canada.

1988 Canadian federal election
Party	Candidate	Votes	%	±%
Progressive Conservative	David MacDonald	22,704	41.36	-11.44
Liberal	Bill Graham	22,624	41.21	+15.08
New Democratic	Doug Wilson	8,266	15.06	-2.77
Libertarian	Chris Blatchly	411	0.75	+0.09
Green	Frank de Jong	397	0.72	-1.15
Rhinoceros	Liane McLarty	265	0.48	
Independent	Mike Constable	102	0.19	
Independent	Harry Margel	91	0.17	
Commonwealth of Canada	Paul Therrien	33	0.06	-0.27
Total valid votes		54,893	100.00	

=== Egmont ===
1980 Canadian federal election
Party	Candidate	Votes	%	±%
Liberal	George Henderson	8,639	52.37	+12.93
Progressive Conservative	David MacDonald	7,033	42.63	-13.44
New Democratic	Vincent Gallant	824	5.00	+0.51
Total valid votes		16,496	100.00	

1979 Canadian federal election
Party	Candidate	Votes	%	±%
Progressive Conservative	David MacDonald	8,861	56.07	+3.82
Liberal	Bill Reese	6,233	39.44	-4.81
New Democratic	Vincent Gallant	710	4.49	+0.98
Total valid votes		15,804	100.00	

1974 Canadian federal election
Party	Candidate	Votes	%	±%
Progressive Conservative	David MacDonald	7,583	52.25	-3.53
Liberal	Bill Reese	6,422	44.25	+3.97
New Democratic	Cletus Shea	509	3.51	-0.04
Total valid votes		14,514	100.00	

1972 Canadian federal election
Party	Candidate	Votes	%	±%
Progressive Conservative	David MacDonald	7,868	55.78	+2.26
Liberal	George W. Olscamp	5,681	40.28	-4.02
New Democratic	Carroll L. Kadey	501	3.55	+1.37
Social Credit	Hugh G. Ryan	55	0.39	
Total valid votes		14,105	100.00	

1968 Canadian federal election
Party	Candidate	Votes	%
Progressive Conservative	David MacDonald	7,182	53.52
Liberal	J. Melville Campbell	5,945	44.30
New Democratic	Harvey Dawson	292	2.18
Total valid votes		13,419	100.00

=== Prince ===
1965 Canadian federal election
Party	Candidate	Votes
Progressive Conservative	David MacDonald	9,082
Liberal	John Watson MacNaught	8,312
New Democratic	Harvey Dawson	384

== Archives ==
There is a David S.H. MacDonald fonds at Library and Archives Canada.

== Notes ==
Political offices
Preceded by Marc Lalonde	Minister responsible for the Status of Women; 4 June 1979 – 2 March 1980	Succeeded by Lloyd Axworthy
