= Progressive Conservative Party of Newfoundland and Labrador =

Provincial political party in Canada

- Leader: Tony Wakeham
- President: Shane Skinner
- Founded: 1949
- Headquarters: 20 Hallett Crescent, P.O. Box 8551 St. John's, NL
- Youth wing: Youth Progressive Conservative (YPC)
- Membership (2023): >10,000
- Ideology: Progressive conservatism Red Toryism; Factions: Liberal conservatism Social democracy
- Political position: Centre-right
- Colours: Blue
- House of Assembly: 20 / 40

Website
- Official website

The Progressive Conservative Party of Newfoundland and Labrador is a provincial political party in Newfoundland and Labrador, Canada. The party was founded in 1949 and has formed the Government of Newfoundland and Labrador since the 2025 general election, with leader Tony Wakeham as premier.

== History ==
=== Origins ===
The party originated before Newfoundland's confederation with Canada as the Responsible Government League (RGL). The RGL campaigned for responsible government to return to Newfoundland, after being suspended in 1934. In the 1948 referendum, Newfoundland narrowly voted to join Canada as its tenth province. Following the referendum, federal parties started organizing in Newfoundland; further, most members of the RGL decided to align themselves with the Progressive Conservative Party of Canada, to form the Progressive Conservative Party of Newfoundland.

=== In the political wilderness (1949–1972) ===
Harry Mews was acclaimed as leader of the Progressive Conservative Party and led them into the 1949 provincial election. Liberal leader Joey Smallwood, who had campaigned for confederation in 1948, led his party to victory, winning 22 seats of the 28 seats available. The Progressive Conservatives only managed to win five seats and Mews, who ran in the district of St. John's West, was unsuccessful in his bid for a seat in the House of Assembly. Mews was elected mayor of St. John's later that year and stepped down as party leader soon after.

The Progressive Conservatives struggled to make gains in the province, being tarred as anti-confederates. Their support was confined to Roman Catholic communities on the Avalon Peninsula outside of St. John's, which had been anti-confederation strongholds in the 1940s. Smallwood continued to lead the Liberal Party through the 1950s and 1960s; however, by 1969 his government started facing problems. Failed megaprojects and controversial policy decisions had started turning the public against Smallwood and his government. He attempted to revitalize his party by appointing younger men to his cabinet, such as John Crosbie, Edward Roberts and Clyde Wells. However, Smallwood continued to face internal strife and announced his resignation as leader and his retirement from politics in 1969. When Crosbie became the front-runner to succeed him as leader, Smallwood decided to run for the leadership. Smallwood's leadership bid was successful and Crosbie, along with a number of young Liberals, defected to the Progressive Conservatives.

The defections of Crosbie and others revitalized the Progressive Conservatives. No longer tarred by their anti-confederate stance in 1948, the Tories were viewed to be a fresh and modern party. For the first time since confederation they became a credible force in forming government. Under the leadership of Gerald Ottenheimer, the party became better organized and built district associations throughout the province. In May 1971, Frank Moores, the federal Member of Parliament for the Avalon-based riding of Bonavista—Trinity—Conception, was elected as party leader.

=== Moores era (1971–1979) ===
Moores led the Tories into the 1971 election. They took 18 seats from the Liberals for a total of 21 seats in the House of Assembly; they had never won more than seven seats previously. The Liberals won 20 seats, leaving the balancee of power with the New Labrador Party's one MHA, Tom Burgess, a former Liberal dissident. Burgess decided to support the Conservatives, allowing Moores to form government by one seat. Smallwood resigned as premier on 18 January 1972, and Moores was sworn in as the second Premier of Newfoundland.

However, when Moores reneged on a promise to name Burgess to cabinet, Burgess defected back to the Liberals. Conservative MHA Hugh Shea crossed the floor to the Liberals just days after Moores was sworn in. Just hours after the new House met, Moores realized he was in no position to govern. He asked Lieutenant Governor Ewart Harnum to dissolve the legislature and call another election. In the March election, Moores led his party to a decisive victory, taking 33 seats and 61% of the vote. The once-dominant Liberals, now led by Roberts (who had ousted Smallwood as leader two months earlier), won nine seats and 37% of the popular vote. Moores was reelected to a second term on 16 September 1975. The number of districts in the province had increased to 52, and the Progressive Conservatives won 30 seats and 46% of the popular vote.

Moores promised that his administration would make government more democratic and accountable, which was in contrast to Smallwood's domineering leadership style. The new Progressive Conservative government vowed to promote rural development and take greater control of the province's natural resources, it also distanced itself from the Liberal Party's resettlement plans, and industrialization policies.

The Moores government was successful in bringing about democratic reforms. His government brought in daily question period, which was common in most legislative assemblies in Canada but was non-existent in Newfoundland. The government also passed the Conflict of Interest Act in 1973, which was the first legislation of its kind in Canada. The act required elected officials and senior civil servants to make public any investments or relationships that could influence the performance of their official duties. It also forbade MHAs from voting or speaking on issues where a conflict of interest could exist. While Smallwood had treated his cabinet as an extension of his authority, Moores gave his ministers more independence and greater control over their departments. The government created a planning and priorities committee of senior ministers, who would discuss and create policy on resource development, government services, and social programs. In 1975, an independent and non-partisan provincial ombudsman was created. His role was to investigate complaints from citizens who felt they were unfairly treated by government departments or agencies.

While the Moores government was successful in implementing democratic reforms, his government had little impact on improving Newfoundland's economy. Much of his time in power was monopolized with completing unfinished industrial projects negotiated by Smallwood, many of which were unsuccessful. The government tried to re-negotiate the sale of Upper Churchill Hydro electricity to Hydro-Quebec, but was unsuccessful. In 1974, $160 million was paid the British Newfoundland Corporation (BRINCO) to buy back water rights and obtain a controlling interest in the Churchill Falls (Labrador) Corporation Limited, with hopes of developing hydro power on the Lower Churchill river. However, the government was not able to negotiate a transmission route across Quebec to sell power into the North American market. The Stephenville linerboard mill was another drain on government money and resources. By the time Moores took office in 1972, the mill's projected cost had increased from $75 million to $122 million, and government guarantees had more than doubled from $53 million to $110 million. The mill was losing $100 on every ton of linerboard it produced by 1976, and needed government subsidies to stay afloat. The province closed the mill, owned by the Crown corporation Labrador Linerboard Limited, in August 1977 and sold the mill to Abitibi-Price Ltd. for $43.5 million. The Come By Chance Refinery also cost the government millions of dollars in loans, including $60 million in 1975. The refinery was $42 million in debt to the province when it filed for bankruptcy in 1976.

With so much money and resources being spent on industrial projects, the Moores government was unable to follow through on promises of rural development. Between five and 10% of government spending was earmarked for fisheries, agriculture, forestry, tourism, and rural development. While Moores disagreed with Smallwood's resettlement plans outmigration of rural to urban areas continued without government intervention. The province's fishery struggled, due to overcapacity in the industry. Unemployment was a major problem in the province, which was only exacerbated by an increasing birth rate since the 1940s. During its first five years in power, the Moores administration increased the public service from 7,600 employees to 9,300. By 1977, the province was spending more money on salaries than it received in tax revenues. At the same time, the province unemployment rate was estimated at 34%. Newfoundland relied on loans and federal transfer payments to pay salaries, finance industrial project and fund other expenditures. Moores announced he was retiring as premier in 1979. When he left office, the provincial debt was approximately $2.6 billion, up from $970 million in 1972.

=== Peckford era (1979–1989) ===
In the 1979 leadership convention, 10 candidates came forward to succeed Moores as leader and premier. The leading candidates in the race were Leo Barry, Walter Carter, Bill Doody and Brian Peckford. At the convention Peckford, who most recently served as Minister of Energy and Mines, was elected Progressive Conservative leader after three ballots. He was sworn in as the third Premier of Newfoundland on 26 March 1979. On 26 May 1979, the legislature was dissolved and an election was set for 18 June 1979. On election night Peckford led the party to an increased majority government, winning 33 seats and 50% of the popular vote. In the 1982 provincial election Peckford led the Progressive Conservatives to a second, and larger, majority government. His party won 60% of the popular vote and took 44 of the 52 seats in the legislature. In the 1985, provincial election the Tories were once again re-elected under Peckford's leadership. However, a significant increase in support for the New Democratic Party (NDP), and a bump in Liberal support, resulted in a significantly reduced majority for the Tories. They won 49% of the vote and 36 seats in the House of Assembly.

Peckford's premiership was heavily focused on resource development. He strove for greater independence from the federal government through constitutional reform, so that Newfoundland could manage its natural resources. Peckford's goals resonated well with voters in the province who were embracing nationalism and their distinct culture. However, much of the province's natural resources were already controlled by outside interests. The disastrous Upper Churchill deal, signed by Smallwood, was benefitting Quebec instead of Newfoundland, mining in Labrador West was controlled by the Iron Ore Company of Canada, multinational companies controlled the forestry, while the federal government controlled much of the fishery. The offshore oil was a new industry which could have very lucrative benefits for the impoverished province, however the federal government challenged Newfoundland's claimed ownership of the resource.

The Peckford administration worked to renegotiate the lopsided Upper Churchill contract with Quebec, however repeated attempts were unsuccessful. The federal government was unwilling to intervene, and in 1984 and 1988 the Supreme Court of Canada ruled twice in Quebec's favour. Like his predecessor, Peckford hoped to develop the Lower Churchill hydro project, but his government was also unsuccessful in securing a transmission route through Quebec. His government sought for constitutional change so that the province would have greater control of the fisheries, but Peckford was unable to get enough support from other premiers. The government did its best to influence federal fisheries policies, but Ottawa still brought in controversial policies that Peckford felt were disastrous. His government also continued with policies that added to overcapacity in the fishery, such as allowing too many fish processing plants to operate.

The biggest success of Peckford's tenure was the signing of the Atlantic Accord, which led to the development of the province's offshore oil industry. In 1984, the Supreme Court of Canada had ruled that the due to oil being located offshore Newfoundland it fell under federal jurisdiction. However, in 1985, Peckford negotiated the Atlantic Accord with Prime Minister Brian Mulroney, the Accord gave the province equal say over offshore management and a large slice of all revenues. The Accord received widespread support and was hailed as a turning point in the province's economy, however it would take years for the offshore oil industry to be developed.

Constitutional reform was a major topic in Canada throughout the 1980s. In 1981, Peckford was instrumental in adding a clause to the Canadian constitution recognizing affirmative action programs. He also supported the Meech Lake Accord, which he hoped would decentralize federal authority and give the province a greater say over fisheries and offshore oil management. Other notable events under Peckford included the appointment of Lynn Verge and Hazel Newhook to the provincial cabinet in 1979, they became the first women to serve as cabinet ministers in Newfoundland and Labrador. Peckford's government also adopted a new provincial flag on 6 June 1980. The province implemented twelfth grade in 1983, the same year construction began on the Trans-Labrador Highway. His government also partnered with Philip Sprung to build hydroponic greenhouses on the island and sell cucumbers in Atlantic Canada and the eastern United States. The "Sprung Greenhouse" was constructed near the St. John's-Mount Pearl boundary, but was an economic failure. Cucumbers grown at the greenhouse were more expensive than what was already available in grocery stores, the province spent $22 million on the Sprung Greenhouse before it went into receivership in 1989.

Towards the end of his political career, Peckford became increasingly unpopular. The provincial economy continued to struggle throughout his premiership, unemployment remained high and revenues were low. A global recession hurt the province's resource sector and the fishery was the brink of collapse. Peckford's promise of rural development only led to make-work projects and federally administered employment insurance programs. While he had hoped the Sprung Greenhouse would help diversify the economy it only hurt the credibility and popularity of him and his party. On 21 January 1989, Peckford announced his retirement from politics.

In that year's leadership election, Fisheries Minister Tom Rideout was narrowly elected leader, beating four other men.

=== Defeat and opposition (1989–2003) ===
Rideout was sworn in as premier of Newfoundland on 22 March 1989. A week after being sworn in as premier he called a general election to be held on 20 April 1989. The Progressive Conservatives went into the election with a large lead in public opinion polls, but that lead evaporated as the campaign wore on. On election night Clyde Wells led his Liberal Party to victory, winning 31 seats compared to 21 for the Tories. While the Liberal Party were able to win more seats and form government, the Progressive Conservatives had actually won the popular vote by a slim 1,400-vote margin.

Rideout stayed on as leader of the party until 17 January 1991, when he announced his resignation. Rideout stated that the party had a better chance of winning the next election with a new leader. Rideout was succeeded as leader by Len Simms, who led the party into the 1993 general election. The election was heavily focused on the economy. The Liberals, under Wells, campaigned on cutting $70 million from the public sector payroll, while both the Tories and New Democrats felt the cuts proposed by Wells were too drastic. The Liberal Party was re-elected and the PC Party lost support and seats to both the Liberals and New Democrats.

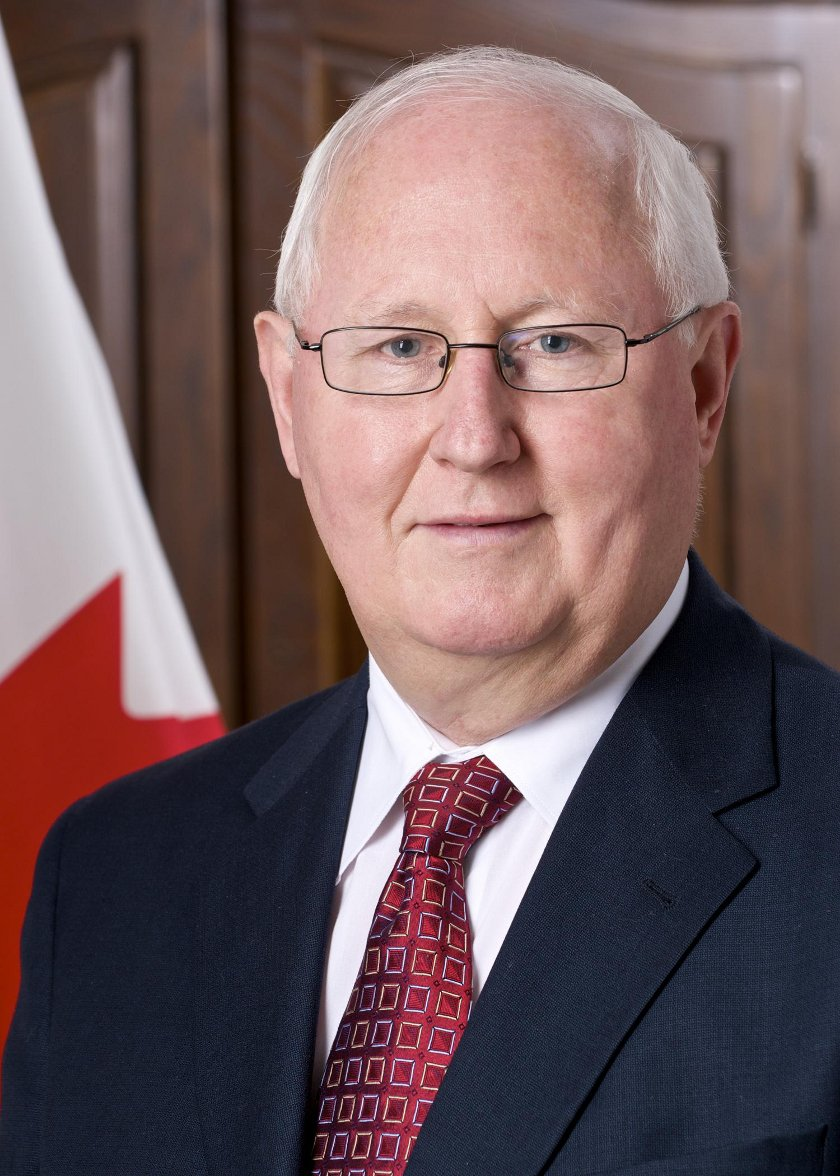
Loyola Sullivan served as interim leader of the party from 1996 to 1998

Simms resigned as leader in 1994 and a leadership convention was held on the weekend of 28–29 April 1995. Unlike the 1979 and 1989 leadership conventions, which saw a large number of candidates, the 1995 race saw just two candidates seek the leadership; Lynn Verge and Loyola Sullivan. Verge was first elected in 1979, becoming one of the first women to serve as a cabinet minister; she had been Deputy Premier under Rideout. Sullivan was a businessman and former educator who was first elected in a 1992 by-election. Both were seen as representing different factions of the party; Verge represented the progressive wing while Sullivan represented the conservative wing. The leadership contest was considered to be a bitter affair by some, with Verge winning by a margin of three votes. With her win, Verge became the first woman to serve as leader of a political party in the province's history.

The PC Party caucus was divided following Verge's win, not only due to her representing the progressive wing but also because of her gender. The divisions within the party remained quiet during her first six months as leader, but became public by November. The PC Party had been confident that they could defeat Wells in the next election, but by November 1995, a Corporate Research Associates (CRA) poll showed that the Liberals held a large lead over the Tories. The following month Wells announced he would be stepping down as premier of Newfoundland. On 26 January 1996, Wells was replaced by Brian Tobin, a popular federal minister in Jean Chrétien's government. There were discussions of ousting Verge as leader, until Tobin called a snap election for 22 February 1996. There were fears that the Liberals would win every seat in the legislature; in the end the PC Party won nine seats and 39% of the popular vote. Although this was the Tories' worst showing in 30 years, Verge had managed to close the gap between the Tories and Liberals as the campaign wore on. Indeed, some Liberal insiders even admitted she could have won the popular vote in the election if the campaign had lasted another week. Verge lost her own seat by seven votes. She subsequently resigned as leader and was succeeded by Sullivan on an interim basis.

Ed Byrne became leader of the Progressive Conservatives in 1998, when he was uncontested for the leadership, and led the party into the 1999 general election. The party gained 2.11% more of the popular vote in the election and increased their caucus from nine members to 14. Two years later, Byrne stepped down as leader of the party and successful businessman and lawyer Danny Williams was acclaimed his successor.

=== Williams era (2001–2010) ===
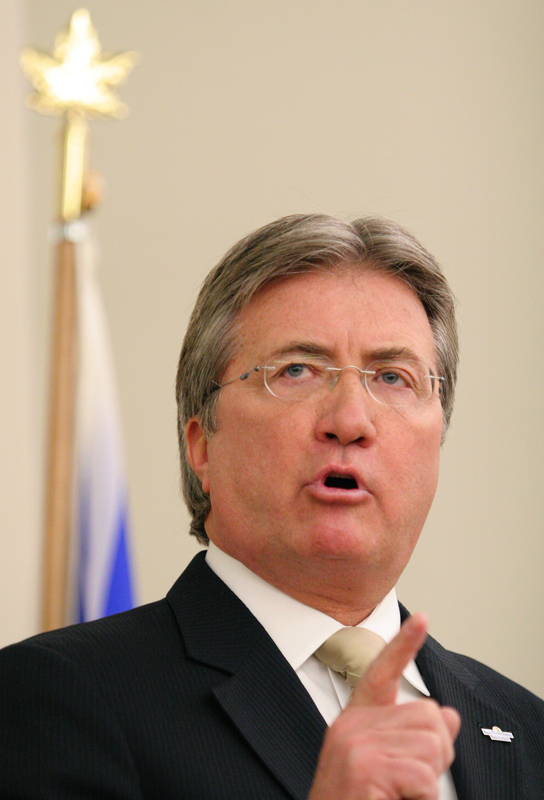
Danny Williams

Two months after taking the leadership, Williams won a by-election in the Corner Brook district of Humber West. The Progressive Conservatives won four by-elections after the 1999 election, and gained another MHA when Liberal Party member Ross Wiseman crossed the floor to join the party. When the legislature was dissolved for the 2003 election the party had increased its caucus to 19 members. In the election the Tories were returned to power after 14 years, winning 34 of the province's 48 seats. In the provincial election in 2007 the Progressive Conservatives won a landslide victory. The party won 44 out of the 48 seats in the House of Assembly and took just under 70% of the popular vote, the largest win for any party in the province's history.

Early in Williams' first term as premier he took a more fiscally conservative approach to governing. He reduced the size of the provincial cabinet following the election, and months later reformed government departments. After discovering that the province was in worse financial shape than previously thought, and facing annual deficits of $1 billion, he made a number of controversial cuts. The construction of new hospitals and schools, that had been planned under the previous Liberal government, were put on hold, and the number of school and health boards were compressed. After a monthlong strike the government legislated public service employees back to work in April 2004, without a pay raise.

After a successful fight with the federal Liberal government to re-negotiate the fiscal arrangement of the Atlantic Accord and a significant increase in oil prices, offshore oil revenues led to record surpluses for the provincial government. The new surpluses led to the Williams government reducing income taxes and significantly increasing government spending. The increases in spending was largely focussed on upgrading the province's infrastructure and social programs. He also gave public service employees increases in pay of over 20%, to make up for years that their pay was frozen. By the time he left office in 2010, government spending had skyrocketed, his provincial cabinet had increased to 18 ministers and the size of the public service was significantly larger than when he took office. While government spending was up substantially his government still managed to reduce the province's net debt by roughly $4 billion and Williams was considered one of the most fiscally responsible premiers in Canada.

On 25 November 2010, Williams announced that he would step down as premier on 3 December 2010 and that Deputy Premier Kathy Dunderdale would serve as the premier of the province until the Progressive Conservatives chose a new leader in 2011.

=== Dunderdale era (2010–2014) ===
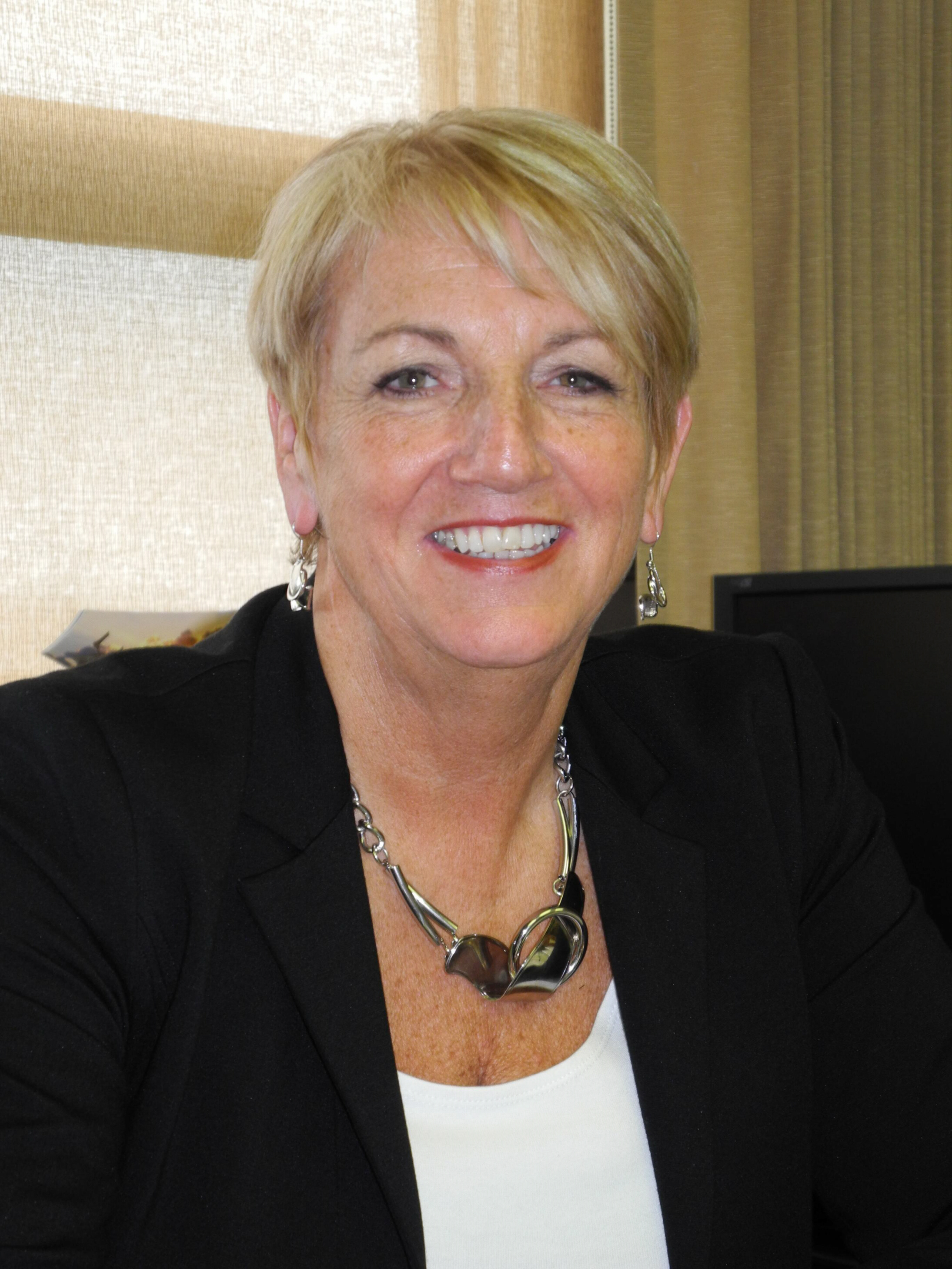
Kathy Dunderdale

Kathy Dunderdale was sworn in as the tenth Premier of Newfoundland and Labrador on 3 December 2010, following the resignation of Williams. She became the first woman in the province to hold the post and only the sixth woman in Canada to become premier. Although she had stated she would not seek the leadership of the party Dunderdale announced on 30 December 2010, that she was entering the leadership race with the backing of her entire caucus. She was the only eligible candidate to seek the leadership and was sworn in as party leader on 2 April 2011. Later that year Dunderdale led the Progressive Conservatives to their third consecutive victory in the provincial election. Despite a drop in support from the previous election the PC Party elected 37 MHAs and won 56% of the popular vote. The development of the Muskrat Falls project, along with other natural resource developments, and the reining in of public spending dominated her time as premier. As well Dunderdale faced many questions about her leadership and communication skills as public support for her and her government declined significantly during her three years in office.

In the lead up to the 2012 budget, Dunderdale and her ministers began to warn the public of looming spending cuts to rein in projected multi-year deficits. Dunderdale said her government had a goal of finding $100 million in savings. When the budget was released on 24 April 2012, it contained few cuts and government spending increased by 1.7%. Finance Minister Tom Marshall said that instead of making large cuts all at once that the government would embark on a "core mandate analysis" to restrain spending growth for the next ten years. The government forecasted that they would run a deficit of $258 million for the 2012–2013 fiscal year. In June 2012, Dunderdale's government brought forth controversial legislation, known as Bill 29, that reformed the province's Access to Information and Protection of Privacy Act. The legislation received widespread criticism from opposition parties, the public and experts in the field of access to information laws. Bill 29 was passed in the House of Assembly after a four-day filibuster by opposition parties. Three months after the bill was passed longtime MHA and former cabinet minister Tom Osborne announced he was leaving the PC caucus due to dissatisfaction with Dunderdale's leadership and his opposition to Bill 29, which he had voted for. On 17 December 2012, Dunderdale along with Emera Energy announced they had both officially sanctioned the Muskrat Falls project, two years after the project was first announced.

While the Dunderdale government and the PC Party fared well in opinion polling conducted throughout 2012 their support trended downwards. In December 2012, a CRA poll showed support for the Progressive Conservatives was at 46%, a drop of 14 percentage points in a year. The same poll showed satisfaction with government stood at 58%, down from 75% in a December 2011 poll. Dunderdale's personal numbers took the biggest hit. Only 36% of people thought Dunderdale was the best choice for premier, down from 59% in a year.

In January 2013, Dunderdale shuffled Jerome Kennedy into the finance portfolio as her government once again warned of large spending cuts. When Kennedy delivered his budget on 26 March 2013, he announced the government would run a $563.8 million deficit for the 2013 fiscal year. The budget included $300 million in spending cuts and saw 1,200 public sector jobs eliminated. Dissatisfaction with Dunderdale and her government increased significantly after the release of the 2013 budget. In the first public opinion poll released after the budget, 65% of respondents said they were dissatisfied with the government's performance. Only 21% felt Dunderdale was the best choice for premier, behind the other two party leaders, and the Progressive Conservative Party fell to third place.

Despite a number of big wins for her government throughout the last half of 2013, Dunderdale struggle to regain the ground she had lost in public opinion following that year's budget. In September her government announced a tentative deal had been reached with NAPE, the province's largest public sector union. Earlier in the year Carol Furlong, the president of NAPE, warned that the union had a war chest built up if a strike was necessary. Her government reached agreements with several other unions throughout the remainder of the year. In October she joined officials with Husky Energy to announce that the company would build a new offshore oil platform for the West White Rose Extension in Placentia. Only weeks later her government announced the benefits they had negotiated as part of the Canada's Comprehensive Economic and Trade Agreement with the European Union, particularly with regards to the fishery. The provincial government agreed to eliminate minimum process requirement for the European Union in exchange for the elimination of high tariffs on seafood. Days later Dunderdale and her ministers were joined with fishing industry officials to announce that as part of the free trade agreement the provincial and federal governments would invest $400 million into the fishery over three years. In December she announced all financing for the Muskrat Falls was in place, with the province borrowing $5-billion, with a 40-year term at 3.8% interest.

While her government's satisfaction increased throughout the last quarter of 2013, there was little change in Dunderdale's personal numbers or support for the Progressive Conservative Party. A CRA poll released in December showed the party had move back into second place, due to a collapse in NDP support, but the gap between them and the first place Liberals increased significantly. The Progressive Conservatives polled at 29% compared to 52% for the Liberals and 19% for the NDP. Dunderdale faced many questions about her leadership but stated numerous times she was not resigning before the next election.

In early January 2014, the province experienced wide spread power outages that effected 190,000 customers. The outages were a result of cold temperatures coupled with problems at generating facilities. The outages lasted for several days which caused businesses to close and delayed the opening of schools and post-secondary institutes following their Christmas break. Dunderdale faced criticism for not addressing the public until several days after rolling blackouts began. When she did address the public Dunderdale was accused of downplaying the significance of the blackouts. Former cabinet minister Shawn Skinner said Dunderdale lacked empathy and compassion when stating that there was no crisis. After weeks of outrage over her handling of the power issue, which saw a PC MHA cross the floor to the Liberals, it was reported that Dunderdale was returning early from vacation to announce her resignation.

On 22 January 2014, Dunderdale announced her resignation as premier in the lobby of the Confederation Building, stating "just as you know when it's time to step up, you also know when it is time to step back, and that time for me is now." Dunderdale said that Finance Minister Tom Marshall would succeed her as premier and become interim leader of the Progressive Conservatives while the party held a leadership convention to find a permanent successor.

=== Marshall era (2014) ===
Marshall was sworn in as the 11th Premier of Newfoundland and Labrador on 24 January 2014. During Marshall's eight months as premier he reversed several controversial decisions the government made while Dunderdale was premier. Five days after being sworn in Marshall announced that he would be striking a committee to review the province's access to information laws due to the backlash the government had received since Bill 29 was adopted in June 2012. He later announced an "Open Government Initiative" to share more data and information online.

In March 2014, Marshall announced his government would also establish an oversight committee for the Muskrat Falls project. The committee would be made up of senior bureaucrats and would release quarterly updates on the project to the public. During the Spring sitting of the legislature his government passed whistleblower legislation to protect public sector employees.. Whistleblower legislation was promised during the 2007 election but the government repeatedly delayed enacting it under both Williams and Dunderdale.

Marshall also announced that a new hospital to be built in Corner Brook would provide cancer treatment. The government had previously said the population of the region did not warrant radiation therapy or a Positron emission tomography (PET) scanner. Following Marshall's announcement that both would be part of the new hospital he shuffled Susan Sullivan out of the Health portfolio. Sullivan, who had defended the decision to not offer the services, was replaced by Paul Davis.

On 2 September 2014, Marshall and Finance Minister Charlene Johnson held a news conference with multiple union leaders to announce that they had negotiated a deal to reform pension plans for the majority of public sector employees. The government had spoken of the need to reform pension plans for years. As of 31 March 2014, the pension liabilities and other post-retirement benefits made up 74% of Newfoundland and Labrador's $9.8 billion net debt. Reforms to the plan included increased contributions by employers and government beginning 1 January 2015, over five years the retirement age will increase to 58 and employees will need to 10 years of service to qualify for a pension rather than five years. The unions and government will jointly manage the fund with the creation of a new corporation and it is expected the plans will be fully funded within 30 years.

While polling showed a significant increase in government satisfaction and high approval ratings for Marshall, the Progressive Conservative Party was unable to regain the support it had lost during Dunderdale's tenure as premier. A CRA poll conducted throughout August 2014, showed that 62% of those polled were satisfied with the government's performance under Marshall. This number was consistent with other polls conducted by CRA during Marshall's time as premier. An Angus Reid Global poll ranking the popularity of Canadian premiers placed Marshall as the third most popular premier in the country, with a 59% approval rating. CRA placed support for the PC Party at 33% in February 2014—a four-point increase since November 2013—but support fell over the next two quarters. The party's support fell to 29% in May and fell again to 26% in August.

=== Davis era (2014–2015) ===
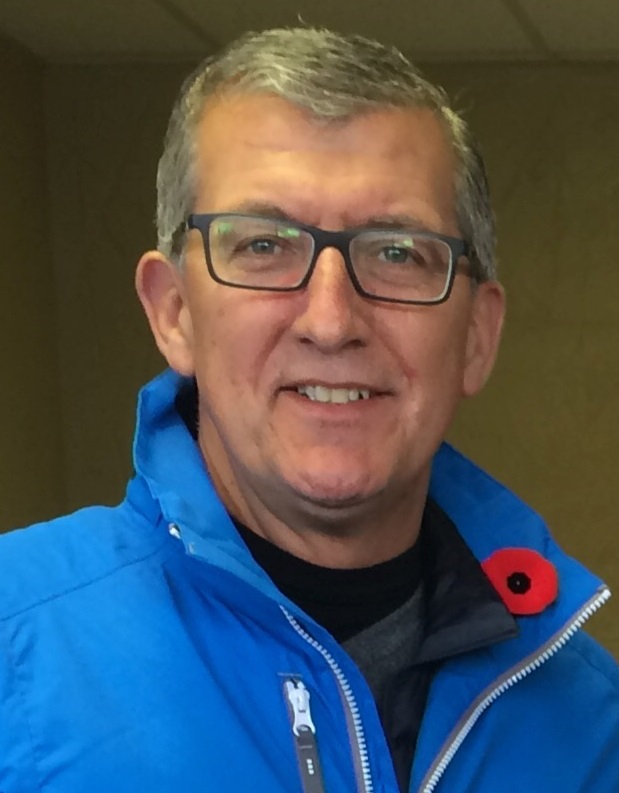
Paul Davis

Davis was sworn in as the 12th Premier of Newfoundland and Labrador on 26 September 2014. It is believed that Davis is the first premier in Canadian history to have previously worked as a Police Officer.

At the swearing in ceremony for his cabinet on 30 September 2014, Davis announced that the Department of Justice would now be titled the Department of Public Safety and that the Fire and Emergency Services portfolio would now fall under the department. In a surprise move Davis announced that St. John's lawyer Judy Manning would serve as the department's new minister, despite not being an elected member of the House of Assembly. Davis received criticism for dropping justice from the department's name as well as the appointment of Manning, due to her being unelected and not willing to seek a seat in the House of Assembly until the next election. Representative from the provincial branch of the Canadian Bar Association met with Davis on 10 October 2014, to question him on why the former Department of Justice was replaced with the Department of Public Safety. Following the meeting Davis announced the department would be renamed the Department of Justice and Public Safety.

On 15 January 2015, Davis announced that the House of Assembly would be opening the following week so that his government could bring forth legislation to reduce the number of electoral districts in the province by 8. Under the province's current legislation a committee was supposed to be set up in 2016 to review electoral boundaries. Davis announced he was speeding up the process in order to reduce the number of districts before the next election, which is supposed to be called by September 2015. Previously there were 48 electoral districts in the province. His government expects that by reducing the number to 40 the government will save $10 million over four years. Along with reducing the number of electoral districts, the Davis government will also review MHA pension plans and identify measures to increase the participation of elected members in the House of Assembly.

On 29 April 2015, Davis along with his Minister of Health and Community Services and Minister of Seniors, Wellness and Social Development announced a plan to partner with private and non-profit providers to create 360 long-term care beds throughout the island portion of the province. A private or non-profit provider would construct and operate new long-term care facilities and the provincial government would pay a per-bed fee. The Davis government hired Partnerships BC - a crown corporation in British Columbia specializing in public private partnerships - to facilitate between government and the potential providers. The move was condemned by the public sector unions who called the move an attack on their workers.

On 22 October 2015, Davis announced the Downpayment Assistance Program, to be administered by the Newfoundland and Labrador Housing Corporation. The program was a two-year pilot project which provided downpayment loans to first-time homebuyers who have low-to-moderate incomes. Applicants must have a household income of $65,000 or less. The downpayment loans range from between $4,500 and $12,500 and successful applicants will not have to begin repaying their loans until five years after the purchase of their home.

=== Opposition (2015–2025) ===
See: 2018 Progressive Conservative Party of Newfoundland and Labrador leadership election
2023 Progressive Conservative Party of Newfoundland and Labrador leadership election

Following the 2015 provincial election, the Progressive Conservative Party was reduced to only 7 seats after previously controlling the government since 2003. In 2016, Paul Davis announced his resignation following the election of a new leader. On 28 April 2018 lawyer Ches Crosbie defeated Health Authority CEO Tony Wakeham to succeed outgoing leader Paul Davis. The leadership convention operated under a mixed vote-points system in which a hundred points were awarded in each of the 40 districts across the province, based on the percentage of vote each candidate won. The final tally was Crosbie with 2,298.92 and Wakeham with 1,701.08 points respectively. Following the election of Crosbie as leader in April 2018, Davis announced he would resign as Leader of the Opposition. Since Crosbie does not have a seat in the House of Assembly, MHA David Brazil was appointed Leader of the Opposition on 14 May 2018. On 20 September 2018 Crosbie won the district of Windsor Lake in a by-election, therefore becoming Leader of the Opposition. In November 2018, Davis resigned as MHA.

Crosbie led the party into the 2019 provincial election with the party increasing its seat count from 7 to 15. The PCs finished 1% behind the Liberals in the popular vote and the Ball government was reduced to a minority.

Crosbie led the party into the 2021 provincial election. He was personally defeated in his district of Windsor Lake; while the party lost one other seat, electing 13 MHAs. The Liberals under Furey won a majority government. On 31 March 2021, Crosbie resigned as leader and MHA David Brazil was appointed interim Leader and interim Leader of the Opposition.

=== Wakeham era (2023–present) ===
On 14 October 2023, MHA Tony Wakeham was elected leader. On 10 November 2023, David Brazil announced his resignation as MHA effective 29 December 2023. On 30 January 2024, Liberal candidate Fred Hutton was elected in the Conception Bay East - Bell Island by-election, gaining the seat from the Progressive Conservatives. On 15 April 2024, the Fogo Island-Cape Freels by-election was held. Progressive Conservative candidate Jim McKenna was elected, gaining the seat from the Liberals. On 27 May 2024, Progressive Conservative candidate Lin Paddock was elected in the Baie Verte-Green Bay by-election, gaining the seat from the Liberals. On 16 July 2024, MHA Lela Evans rejoined the PC Party.

Wakeham led his party to a majority government in the 2025 Newfoundland and Labrador general election, in a major political upset. The party made gains in the rural areas of the province, while gaining no seats in St. John's.

On September 14, 2026, MHA Keith Russell announced that he was leaving the PC caucus to sit as an Independent MHA.

== Ideologies and policies ==
The Progressive Conservative Party is a political party which is made up of two dominant factions: social democrats and liberal conservatives. The leadership of the party has tended to be dominated by centrists or proponents of the Third Way throughout the party's history. Party leaders Brian Peckford, Tom Rideout, and Lynn Verge were all seen as being part of the Red Tory base of the party, while their main challengers in at the leadership conventions, Bill Doody, Len Simms, and Loyola Sullivan, were considered to be further to the right. Danny Williams has stated that he considers the PC Party to be a grouping of Red Tories whose social and fiscal viewpoints are softer than those of the federal Conservative Party that was formed in 2003.

During the Constitutional negotiations of the 1980s, the Tories supported a decentralized federation, while the Liberals were in favour of a strong central government. The Tories lost power in 1989 but continued to argue for decentralization in opposition, voting in favour of a package of proposed constitutional amendments called the Meech Lake Accord, while the Liberal Party led by Clyde Wells opposed it.

== Federal affiliation ==
The party still recognizes select ex-officio representation at its annual General meetings from the Conservative Party of Canada (and the legacy federal PC Party before the merger of the federal PC and CA Parties in 2003). While there is some overlap in support federally and provincially, there have been periods of tension and distance.

Under Premier Williams, the party's relationship with federal Conservatives, led by Stephen Harper, was often tenuous. After Harper reneged on a promise made to Williams during the 2006 federal election, regarding equalization payments, Williams launched the Anything But Conservative (ABC) campaign. The ABC campaign encouraged people to vote for any other party but the Conservatives, with a goal of making sure no Conservative was elected in the next federal election in Newfoundland and Labrador. The campaign, which was supported by all but one member of Williams' caucus, crippled the federal party's ability to find candidates and volunteers. On election night the campaign was successful, the Conservative Party lost the three seats they had held prior to the election, and won only 17% of the popular vote in the province. Despite being shut out of Newfoundland and Labrador the Conservatives did manage to win a second minority government. Following the election Williams announced that it was time to end his battle with Ottawa, and both he and Harper signaled a willingness to work with each other.

When Dunderdale succeeded Williams as Premier, she worked to build a stronger relationship between the province and Harper's Conservative government. At the beginning of the May 2011 federal election campaign, Dunderdale gave the green light to members of her caucus to campaign with the federal Conservative Party. At a campaign stop in St. John's, Dunderdale, along with the majority of her caucus, endorsed the Conservative Party. After having difficulty attracting candidates in 2008, the Conservatives ran three former provincial cabinet ministers who served under Williams. Despite the support from the provincial party the Conservatives were unable to get back to their traditional level of support, they elected one MP and increased their popular vote to 28%. During a 2017 visit to St. John's, federal Conservative leader Andrew Scheer met with then-PC leader Paul Davis. In 2018, Scheer visited St. John's during the Regatta celebration and met with PC leader Ches Crosbie.

== Election results ==
| Election | Leader | Votes | % | Seats | +/– | Position | Status |
|---|---|---|---|---|---|---|---|
| 1949 | Harry Mews | 55,111 | 32.7 | 5 / 28 | ▲5 | ▲2nd | Opposition |
| 1951 | Peter Cashin | 46,782 | 35.3 | 4 / 28 | ▼1 | 2nd | Opposition |
| 1956 | Malcolm Hollett | 36,591 | 31.6 | 4 / 36 | 0 | 2nd | Opposition |
| 1959 | Malcolm Hollett | 33,002 | 25.3 | 3 / 36 | ▼1 | 2nd | Opposition |
| 1962 | James Greene | 45,055 | 36.6 | 7 / 42 | ▲4 | 2nd | Opposition |
| 1966 | Noel Murphy | 50,316 | 34.0 | 3 / 42 | ▼4 | 2nd | Opposition |
| 1971 | Frank Moores | 118,899 | 51.3 | 21 / 42 | ▲18 | ▲1st | Minority |
| 1972 | Frank Moores | 126,508 | 60.5 | 33 / 42 | ▲12 | 1st | Majority |
| 1975 | Frank Moores | 101,016 | 45.5 | 30 / 51 | ▼1 | 1st | Majority |
| 1979 | Brian Peckford | 119,151 | 50.4 | 33 / 52 | ▲3 | 1st | Majority |
| 1982 | Brian Peckford | 152,966 | 61.2 | 44 / 52 | ▲11 | 1st | Majority |
| 1985 | Brian Peckford | 134,893 | 48.6 | 36 / 52 | ▼8 | 1st | Majority |
| 1989 | Tom Rideout | 138,609 | 47.6 | 21 / 52 | ▼15 | ▼2nd | Opposition |
| 1993 | Len Simms | 127,150 | 42.1 | 16 / 52 | ▼5 | 2nd | Opposition |
| 1996 | Lynn Verge | 110,312 | 38.6 | 9 / 48 | ▼7 | 2nd | Opposition |
| 1999 | Ed Byrne | 108,772 | 40.7 | 14 / 48 | ▲5 | 2nd | Opposition |
| 2003 | Danny Williams | 162,949 | 58.7 | 34 / 48 | ▲20 | ▲1st | Majority |
| 2007 | Danny Williams | 155,943 | 69.5 | 44 / 48 | ▲10 | 1st | Majority |
| 2011 | Kathy Dunderdale | 124,523 | 56.1 | 37 / 48 | ▼7 | 1st | Majority |
| 2015 | Paul Davis | 60,080 | 30.1 | 7 / 40 | ▼30 | ▼2nd | Opposition |
| 2019 | Ches Crosbie | 90,791 | 42.6 | 15 / 40 | ▲8 | 2nd | Opposition |
| 2021 | Ches Crosbie | 69,314 | 38.8 | 13 / 40 | ▼2 | 2nd | Opposition |
| 2025 | Tony Wakeham | 88,550 | 44.4 | 21 / 40 | ▲8 | ▲1st | Majority |

== Party leaders ==
| Leader | | Years in office |
|---|---|---|
| 1 | Harry Mews | 1949–1950 |
| 2 | John Higgins | 1950–1951 |
| 3 | Peter Cashin | 1951–1953 |
| 4 | Malcolm Hollett | 1953–1959 |
| 5 | James Greene | 1959–1966 |
| 6 | Noel Murphy | 1966 |
| 7 | Gerry Ottenheimer | 1966–1969 |
| 8 | William Marshall (interim) | 1969–1970 |
| 9 | Frank Moores | 1970–1979 |
| 10 | Brian Peckford | 1979–1989 |
| 11 | Tom Rideout | 1989–1991 |
| 12 | Len Simms | 1991–1995 |
| 13 | Lynn Verge | 1995–1996 |
| 14 | Loyola Sullivan | 1996–1998 |
| 15 | Ed Byrne | 1998–2001 |
| 16 | Danny Williams | 2001–2010 |
| 17 | Kathy Dunderdale | 2010–2014 |
| 18 | Tom Marshall (interim) | 2014 |
| 19 | Paul Davis | 2014–2018 |
| 20 | Ches Crosbie | 2018–2021 |
| 21 | David Brazil (interim) | 2021–2023 |
| 22 | Tony Wakeham | 2023–present |

Moores, Peckford, Rideout, Williams, Dunderdale, Marshall, Davis, and Wakeham have been both leader and premier.

== List of Presidents of the PC Party of NL ==
| Presidents | | Time in Office |
|---|---|---|
| 1. | James J. Greene | 1974-1975 |
| 2. | Mac LeMessurier | 1979-1980 |
| 3. | Paul Reynolds | 1981-1983 |
| 4. | Pat Malone | 1985 |
| 5. | Seamus Gibbons | 1986 |
| 6. | Harold Porter | 1987-1989 |
| 7. | Steve Delaney | 1989-1991 |
| 8. | James Oxford | 1992-1994 |
| 9. | Doug Adams | 1994-1995 |
| 10. | Calvin Powell | 1995-1996 |
| 11. | Dennis Kendall | 1996-1998 |
| 12. | Lorne Woolridge | 1998-1999 |
| 13. | Kevin O'Brien | 1999-2000 |
| 14. | Karen Noftall | 2001-2002 |
| 15. | Kathy Dunderdale | 2002-2003 |
| 16. | Robert Lundrigan | 2003-2004 |
| 17. | John Babb | 2004-2012 |
| 18. | Cillian Sheahan | 2012-2014 |
| 19. | Mark Whiffen | 2014-2016 |
| 20. | Graydon Pelley | 2016-2018 |
| 21. | Charlotte Halleran | 2018 |
| 22. | Eugene Manning | 2019-2021 |
| 23. | Matthew Janes | 2021 |
| 24. | Shane Skinner | 2021 – present |

== See also ==
- Progressive Conservative Party of Newfoundland and Labrador leadership elections
- List of premiers of Newfoundland and Labrador
- Leader of the Opposition (Newfoundland and Labrador)
- List of political parties in Newfoundland and Labrador
- Conservative parties in Newfoundland (pre-Confederation)
- List of Newfoundland and Labrador general elections
