= John Watson MacNaught =

Canadian politician

The Hon. John Watson MacNaught

Member of the Canadian Parliament for Prince
- In office 1945–1957
- Preceded by: James Ralston
- Succeeded by: Orville Howard Phillips
- In office 1963–1965
- Preceded by: Orville Howard Phillips
- Succeeded by: David MacDonald

Personal details
- Born: 19 June 1904 Coleman, Prince Edward Island
- Died: 25 December 1984 (aged 80)
- Party: Liberal
- Cabinet: Solicitor General of Canada (1963–1965); Minister Without Portfolio (1963–1965); Minister of Mines and Technical Surveys (1965)
- Portfolio: Parliamentary Assistant to the Minister of Fisheries (1948–1957)

John Watson MacNaught, PC (19 June 1904 – 25 December 1984) was a Canadian politician.

Born in Coleman, Prince Edward Island, he was first elected to the House of Commons of Canada representing the riding of Prince in the 1945 federal election. A Liberal, he was re-elected in 1949 and 1953. He was defeated in 1957 and in 1958. He was re-elected in 1963 and was defeated in 1965. He was defeated again in 1974. He was the Parliamentary Assistant to the Minister of Fisheries. From 1963 to 1965, he was the Solicitor General of Canada and a Minister without Portfolio. In 1965, he was the Minister of Mines and Technical Surveys.
