= Patrick Charles Murphy =

Canadian politician

The Honourable Patrick Charles Murphy
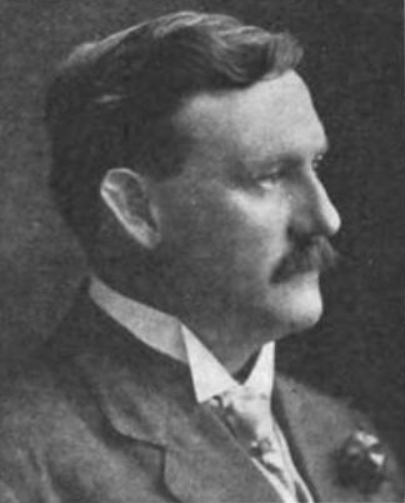

Member of the Senate of Canada
- In office 1912–1925

Personal details
- Born: September 14, 1868 Kinkora, Prince Edward Island
- Died: March 6, 1925 (aged 56) Tignish, Prince Edward Island
- Party: Conservative
- Spouse: Eveleen Clarke
- Children: 8
- Occupation: Physician, politician

Patrick Charles Murphy, M.D., (September 14, 1868 – March 6, 1925) was a Canadian Senator and physician.

== Biography ==
Born in Kinkora, Prince Edward Island on September 14, 1868, Murphy became a physician and prominent citizen in Tignish. He was a Conservative candidate in the riding of Prince during the 1911 federal election but was defeated by 115 votes. The Conservatives came to power, however, and Murphy was appointed to the Senate in 1912 on the advice of the new prime minister, Robert Borden, and sat in the upper house as a Conservative until his death.

He died in Tignish on March 6, 1925.
