= James Greene (Canadian politician) =

Canadian lawyer and politician

James Joseph Louis (Jim) Greene (June 15, 1928 – November 4, 2014) was the Newfoundland and Labrador's Opposition Leader from 1960 to 1965 and leader of the Progressive Conservative Party of Newfoundland. He led the party through the 1962 provincial election in which the party increased its seat total in the Newfoundland House of Assembly from 3 to 7, more than doubling them, and its share of the popular vote from 25% to 36%. The result was not enough to prevent the Liberal government of Joey Smallwood from returning to power with a substantial majority government.

The son of Joseph Michael Greene and Marie Eugenie Williams, he was born in St. John's and was educated at Saint Bonaventure's College, at the University of Notre Dame and at Merton College, Oxford. Greene was called to the bar of England and Wales in 1953 and practised law in London for several months, returning to Newfoundland in September of that year. He was called to the Newfoundland bar in October 1953. He was a 31-year-old lawyer when he was first elected to the legislature in the riding of what was then called St. John's East during the 1959 provincial election by defeating incumbent James D. Higgins, leader of the United Newfoundland Party which had broken away from the Tories prior to the election. Prior to being elected, Greene was counsel to the International Woodworkers of America's Newfoundland local. The election also saw the defeat of Conservative leader Malcolm Mercer Hollett after Smallwood personally unseated him run in his St. John's West riding.

Subsequent to the election, Greene replaced Hollett as party leader and leader of the opposition.

In the 1962 provincial election, Greene succeeded in being personally re-elected and in increasing his party's number of seats to 7 based and increasing his party's share of the vote from 25% to 36% and in wiping out the breakaway United Newfoundland Party whose sole remaining MHA was defeated by a Tory candidate. However, the Tory gains were not enough to stop the Liberals from being re-elected with a commanding majority.

Greene stepped down as party leader on January 14, 1966, and Noel Murphy was chosen acting leader. Greene did not run for the legislature in the 1966 provincial election and returned to his law practice. In 1967, during the federal Progressive Conservative leadership election, he supported the candidacy of E. Davie Fulton.

He served as chair of the board of regents for Memorial University, as a director for Churchill Falls (Labrador) Corporation and as president of the Kiwanis Club of St. John's.

On November 4, 2014, he died in St. John's at the age of 86. Greene's father Joseph served in the Newfoundland House of Assembly from 1928 to 1932. His great uncle, Daniel Joseph Greene, was Premier of the Colony Newfoundland from 1894 to 1895.
