= Noel Murphy (politician) =

Canadian politician

Leader of the Opposition
- In office 1966–1966
- Preceded by: James Greene
- Succeeded by: Gerry Ottenheimer

Leader of the Progressive Conservative Party
- In office 1966–1966
- Preceded by: James Greene
- Succeeded by: Gerry Ottenheimer

MHA for Humber East
- In office 1962–1966
- Preceded by: John A. Forsey
- Succeeded by: Clyde Wells

Personal details
- Born: 15 December 1915 London, England
- Died: 10 March 2005 (aged 89) Corner Brook, Newfoundland and Labrador, Canada
- Party: Progressive Conservative

Military service
- Allegiance: Newfoundland
- Branch/service: Royal Air Force Volunteer Reserve
- Years of service: 1942-1945
- Rank: Flight lieutenant
- Unit: No. 125 (Newfoundland) Squadron
- Battles/wars: Second World War

Noel Francis Murphy (21 December 1915 – 10 March 2005) was a physician, broadcaster and politician.

== Early life ==
Murphy was born in England while his parents, Dr. John J. and Elsie (Kenway) Murphy were posted to London. John Murphy co-founded St. Clare's Mercy Hospital and was later transferred to a RAF base in Newfoundland. He died while Noel and his sisters, Patricia and Maureen were young children. Elsie, then had no other choice but to return to England to join the work force--the goal being, to afford a Catholic school education for her only son. The sisters were sent to an orphanage until the completion of Noel's education, when she was then able to reclaim them. Murphy's great-grandfather was the captain of a steam sailing ship while his grandfather, "Gambo Jack" Murphy founded St. John's radio station VONF in 1932.

Murphy was educated at St. Bonaventure College in St. John's and at Ampleforth College in England. He studied electrical engineering for six months at the Massachusetts Institute of Technology before deciding to change fields. He moved to Britain and earned his medical degree in 1942 from London Hospital. He joined the RAF Volunteer Reserve and was assigned to 125 (Newfoundland) Squadron serving as its medical officer until 1945 and reaching the rank of flight-lieutenant surgeon.

== Return to Newfoundland ==
In 1945, he returned to Newfoundland to run a Bonne Bay Cottage Hospital in Norris Point on the western coast of Newfoundland. He was the only doctor on staff and handled all medical duties at the remote hospital for ten years. To reach remote communities in the hospital's catchment area during the winter, Dr. Murphy travelled by horse and sleigh or dog team before the federal government provided him with a snowmobile. In the summer, he performed his rounds via aircraft and boat.

Dr. Murphy left the hospital in 1954 in order to take up private practice in Corner Brook specializing in obstetrics and gynecology.

== Broadcasting ==
In 1959, Murphy helped found the Humber Valley Broadcasting Company becoming the new corporation's president. The company opened a radio station in Corner Brook in 1960 and had 10 stations by 1975. Murphy hosted a Christmas morning show for 47 years on the stations in which he phoned Newfoundlanders abroad and contacted communities named Newfoundland.

== Political career ==
He entered politics on behalf of the Progressive Conservative Party of Newfoundland and Labrador and won the seat of Humber East in the 1962 provincial election. In 1966 he became party leader and Leader of the Opposition leading the Tories into the 1966 general election. The party lost four of its seven seats and Murphy was defeated in Humber East by Liberal Clyde Wells, a future premier.

Murphy was elected mayor of Corner Brook for three terms and was unexpectedly appointed minister without portfolio in 1971 in the final cabinet of Liberal Premier Joey Smallwood however he lost the riding of Humber West in the subsequent 1971 provincial election to Conservative leader Frank Moores who would succeed Smallwood as Premier.

In 1978, Murphy was again elected mayor of Corner Brook.

== Hobbies ==
In his spare time, Murphy was an amateur photographer and was published the monthly Newfoundland Magazine. In 2003 he published a book, entitled Cottage Hospital Doctor, about his experiences at Bonne Bay.

== Honours ==
Murphy's awards include an honorary doctorate in law from the Memorial University of Newfoundland (1975), Canadian Broadcaster of the Year (1984), and the Order of Canada (1988).
