= Paul Hatfield (Canadian politician) =

Canadian politician (1873–1935)

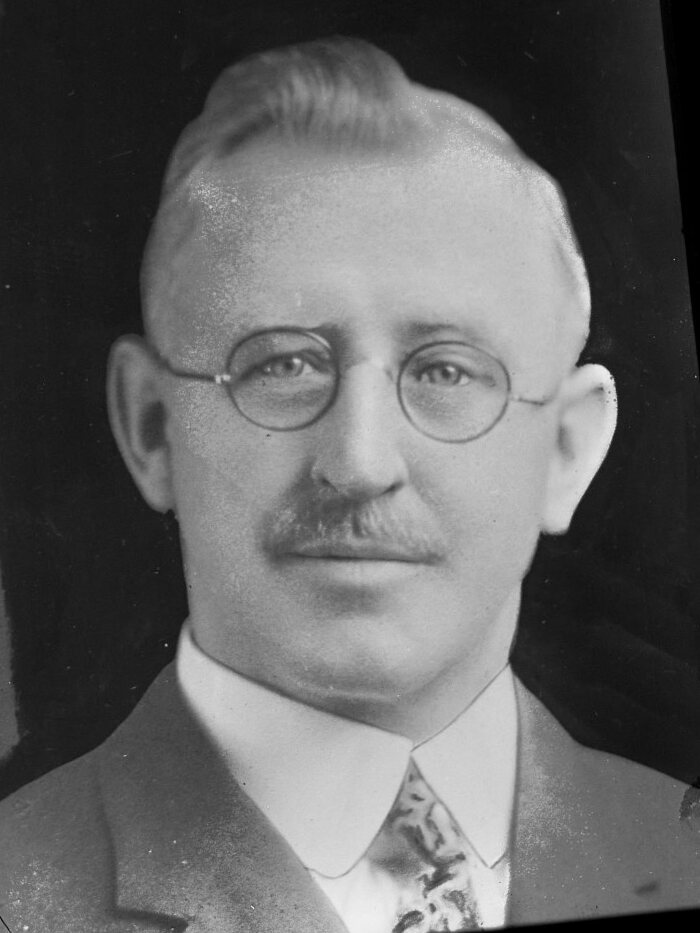
- Hatfield, c. 1926

Member of Parliament for Yarmouth and Clare
- In office December 1921 – October 1925
- Preceded by: Edgar Keith Spinney
- Succeeded by: riding dissolved

Member of Parliament for Shelburne—Yarmouth
- In office October 1925 – October 1926
- Preceded by: riding created
- Succeeded by: James Layton Ralston

Member of the Senate of Canada for the Yarmouth, Nova Scotia division
- In office October 1926 – January 1935

Personal details
- Born: Paul Lacombe Hatfield; 13 March 1873 Arcadia, Nova Scotia, Canada
- Died: 28 January 1935 (aged 61) Yarmouth, Nova Scotia, Canada
- Party: Liberal
- Spouse(s): Sadie M. Trefry m. 11 August 1901
- Profession: broker, insurance agent, master mariner

Paul Lacombe Hatfield (13 March 1873 – 28 January 1935) was a Liberal party member of the House of Commons of Canada. He was born in Arcadia, Nova Scotia and became a broker, insurance agent and master mariner. He also served as a warden and municipal councillor for Yarmouth, Nova Scotia.

The son of Abraham Hatfield and Margaret Short, he established himself in Yarmouth.

He was first elected to Parliament at the Yarmouth and Clare riding in the 1921 general election. After completing his first term in the House of Commons, riding boundaries were changed and Hatfield became a candidate in the new Shelburne—Yarmouth riding for the 1925 election where he won re-election. Hatfield was re-elected in 1926.

He was appointed to the Senate on 7 October 1926 and remained in that role until his death on 28 January 1935.
