= James Campbell Haig =

Canadian politician

James Campbell Haig (June 2, 1909 – February 5, 1980) was a Canadian Senator from Manitoba.

He was born in Winnipeg, Manitoba and educated from the University of Manitoba in 1934 earning a law degree. A corporate lawyer, he became involved in politics and served as the chairman of the Winnipeg school board and was a member of the Board of Regents of United College (which later became the University of Winnipeg).

A supporter of the Progressive Conservative Party of Canada he was appointed to the Senate in 1962 on the advice of Prime Minister John Diefenbaker. He resigned from the Senate in 1977 at the age of 67.
