= George Henderson (Prince Edward Island politician) =

Canadian politician (1935–2020)

George Roland Henderson (10 November 1935 – 5 May 2020) was a Canadian politician, shellfish technician, farmer and electrical engineer. He served as a Liberal party member of the House of Commons of Canada.

Born in Freeland, Prince Edward Island, Henderson was the son of R. Edgar Henderson and Hazel Edna Hardy, and was educated at Prince of Wales College. In 1960, he married Brenda Jane Matthews.

He was president of Malpeque Oyster Cultures Inc. Henderson represented 2nd Prince in the Legislative Assembly of Prince Edward Island from 1974 to 1980 as a Liberal. He served in the province's Executive Council from 1974 to 1978 as Minister of Fisheries and Minister of Labour and from 1978 to 1980 as Minister of Highways and Minister of Public Works. He resigned his seat in 1980 to enter federal politics.

In the House of Commons, he represented Prince Edward Island's Egmont electoral district where he won election in 1980 and 1984. Henderson left national politics in 1988 and did not campaign in that year's election after serving in the 31st and 32nd Canadian Parliaments.

Henderson was parliamentary secretary for the Minister of Fisheries and Oceans from 1980 to 1981 and for the Minister of Defence from 1982 to 1983.

His son Robert was elected to the Prince Edward Island legislative assembly on 28 May 2007, in that province's election.

== Electoral record ==
1984 Canadian federal election: Egmont
Party	Candidate	Votes	%	±%
Liberal	George Henderson	8,777	49.78	-2.59
Progressive Conservative	George Dewar	7,859	44.58	+1.95
New Democratic	Wain Munro	994	5.64	+0.64
Total valid votes		17,630	100.00	

1980 Canadian federal election: Egmont
Party	Candidate	Votes	%	±%
Liberal	George Henderson	8,639	52.37	+12.93
Progressive Conservative	David MacDonald	7,033	42.63	-13.44
New Democratic	Vincent Gallant	824	5.00	+0.51
Total valid votes		16,496	100.00	
Source(s) "Egmont, Prince Edward Island (1968-04-23 - )". History of Federal Ridings Since 1867. Library of Parliament.
