= Alfred Edgar MacLean =

Canadian politician

Alfred Edgar MacLean (May 8, 1868 – October 28, 1939) was a Canadian farmer, fox rancher, trader and political figure in Prince Edward Island. He represented 3rd Prince in the Legislative Assembly of Prince Edward Island from 1915 to 1921 and Prince in the House of Commons of Canada from 1921 to 1939 as a Liberal.

He was born on Prince Edward Island, the son of Roderick A. MacLean, and was educated in Summerside and at the Truro Agricultural College. MacLean married Henrietta S. Stewart. He served eight years on the municipal council for the Summerside Town Council. MacLean resigned his seat in the provincial assembly to run for a seat in the House of Commons in 1921. He died in office in 1939 at the age of 71.
