= Léon Mercier Gouin =

Canadian politician

The Honourable Léon Mercier Gouin
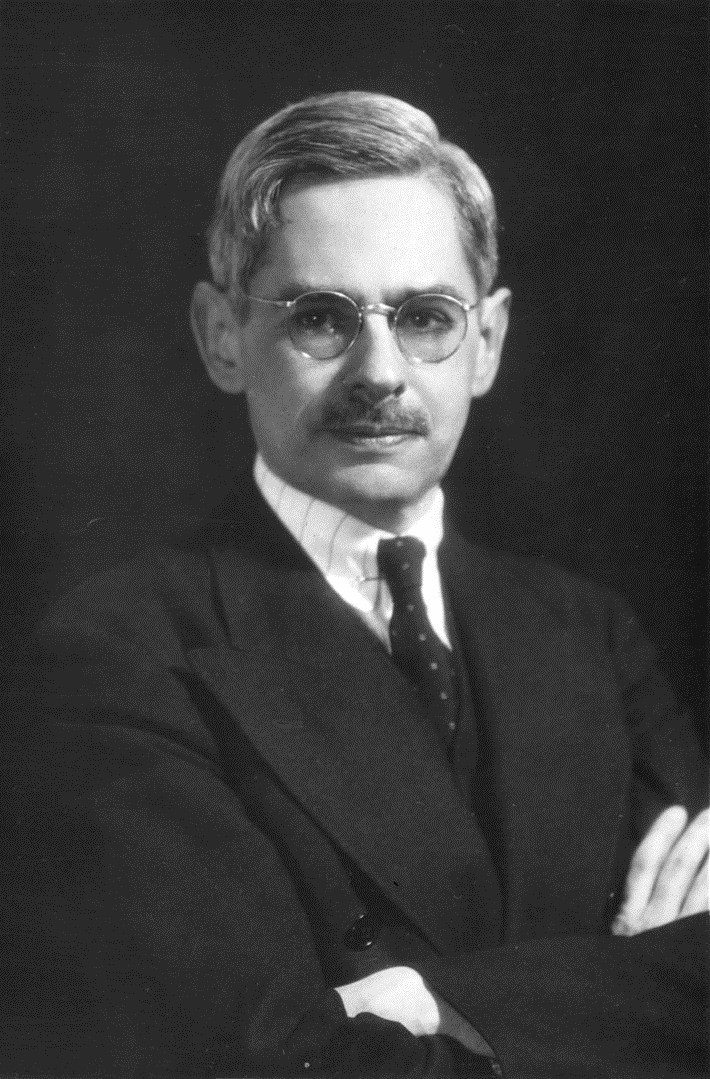

Senator for De Salaberry, Quebec
- In office 1940–1976
- Appointed by: William Lyon Mackenzie King
- Preceded by: Guillaume-André Fauteux
- Succeeded by: Yvette Boucher Rousseau

Personal details
- Born: December 24, 1891 Montreal, Quebec
- Died: October 16, 1983 (aged 91)
- Party: Liberal
- Relations: Lomer Gouin, father Honoré Mercier, grandfather Paul Gouin, brother

Léon Mercier Gouin (French pronunciation: [le.ɔ̃.mɛʁ.sje.gwɛ̃]; December 24, 1891 – October 16, 1983) was a French Canadian barrister, professor, politician, and writer.

Born in Montreal, Quebec, the eldest son of Lomer Gouin, the Premier of Quebec from 1905 to 1920, and the grandson of Honoré Mercier, the Quebec Premier from 1887 to 1891, he received a bachelor's degree from Loyola College in 1911 and studied at Oxford University. His brother, Paul Gouin, was also a politician. In 1917, he married Yvette Ollivier. They had four children: Lisette, Lomer, Thérèse and Olivier.

Gouin was appointed to the Senate of Canada in 1940 representing the senatorial division of De Salaberry, Quebec. A Liberal, he resigned in 1976.
