= Alexander Boyd Baird =

Canadian politician

The Honourable Alexander Boyd Baird

Senator for St. John's, Newfoundland and Labrador
- In office August 17, 1949 – November 23, 1967
- Appointed by: Louis St. Laurent

Personal details
- Born: August 31, 1891 St. John's, Newfoundland Colony
- Died: November 23, 1967 (aged 76)
- Party: Liberal

Military service
- Allegiance: Newfoundland
- Years of service: 1914–1918
- Rank: Major
- Unit: Royal Newfoundland Regiment
- Battles/wars: World War I

Alexander Boyd Baird (August 31, 1891 – November 23, 1967) was a Canadian businessman and Senator.

Born in St. John's, Newfoundland Colony, he was summoned to the Canadian Senate in 1949 and represented the senatorial division of St. John's, Newfoundland and Labrador. A Liberal, he served until he died in 1967.

Baird served as a Major in the Royal Newfoundland Regiment during World War I from 1914 to 1918.

== See also ==
- List of Newfoundland and Labrador senators
