= Edgar Keith Spinney =

Canadian politician

The Hon. Edgar Keith Spinney

Member of the Canadian Parliament for Yarmouth and Clare
- In office 1917–1921
- Succeeded by: Paul Hatfield

Personal details
- Born: January 26, 1851 Argyle, Nova Scotia
- Died: May 13, 1926 (aged 75)
- Party: Unionist

Edgar Keith Spinney, PC (January 26, 1851 – May 13, 1926) was a Canadian politician.

== Early life ==
Born in Argyle, Nova Scotia, he was an insurance agent and merchant.

== Political career ==
He was elected to the House of Commons of Canada for the Nova Scotia riding of Yarmouth and Clare in the 1917 federal election. He was defeated in the 1921 election and the 1925 election. From 1920 to 1921, he was a Minister without Portfolio in the cabinet of Arthur Meighen.
