= Michael Basha =

Canadian politician

The Hon. Michael G. Basha

Senator for West Coast, Newfoundland and Labrador
- In office 24 January 1951 – 18 November 1976
- Appointed by: Louis St. Laurent

Personal details
- Born: 20 January 1896 Baalbeck, Ottoman Empire
- Died: 26 November 1976 (aged 80)
- Party: Liberal

Michael G. Basha (20 January 1896 – 26 November 1976) was a Canadian businessman, manufacturer, and Senator.

Born in Baalbeck, Ottoman Empire, he was summoned to the Canadian Senate in 1951 and represented the senatorial division of West Coast, Newfoundland and Labrador. A Liberal, he resigned in November 1976 shortly before his death. Basha is considered the first Arab politician to be appointed to the Canadian Senate. He is also one of the first Arab politicians in Canadian history.

== See also ==
- List of Newfoundland and Labrador senators
