= Orville Howard Phillips =

Canadian politician (1924–2009)

The Honourable Orville Howard Phillips

Member of the Canadian Parliament for Prince
- In office June 10, 1957 – February 4, 1963
- Preceded by: John Watson MacNaught
- Succeeded by: John Watson MacNaught

Senator for Prince Edward Island
- In office February 5, 1963 – March 24, 1999
- Appointed by: John Diefenbaker

Personal details
- Born: April 5, 1924 O'Leary, Prince Edward Island, Canada
- Died: April 24, 2009 (aged 85)
- Party: Progressive Conservative
- Committees: • Chair, Standing Committee of Selection (1986-1993) • Chair, Subcommittee on Veterans Affairs of the Standing Committee on Social Affairs, Science and Technology (1994-1999)
- Portfolio: Government Whip in the Senate (1984-1991)

Orville Howard Phillips (April 5, 1924 – April 24, 2009) was a Canadian dental surgeon, politician, and senator.

== Early life ==
Born in O'Leary, Prince Edward Island, the son of J. S. and Maude Phillips, he received his D.D.S. from Dalhousie University in 1952.

== Career ==
He practised dentistry for many years.

In 1957, he was elected to the House of Commons of Canada representing the riding of Prince. A member of the Progressive Conservative Party of Canada, he served as Member of Parliament (MP) until 1962.

In 1963, he was appointed to the Senate, representing the senatorial division of Prince, Prince Edward Island. A Progressive Conservative, he was the last senator serving in the Senate who was appointed for life. A change in the law meant that senators could only serve until turning 75. All senators for life who had been appointed before the change were grandfathered in to allow them to serve beyond that, but many agreed to abide by the law and resign at 75. Phillips was the last remaining life senator and chose to resign from the Senate upon turning age 75 in 1999.

== Personal life ==
He married Marguerite Woodside in 1945. They had four children: Brian, Betty, Robert and Patricia.
