= Ray Petten =

Canadian politician

Ray Petten (June 1, 1897 – February 16, 1961) was one of Newfoundland's first Senators as one of three appointees made to the Senate of Canada on August 17, 1949.

A customs broker and fish exporter's agent, he had been a supporter and chief fundraiser of Joey Smallwood's Newfoundland Confederate Association which had campaigned for the former colony to join Canadian Confederation.

In the 1950s he was treasurer of the Newfoundland Liberal Party.

His son, William Petten, was appointed to the Senate in 1968.
