= Frank Corbett Welch =

Canadian politician

The Hon. Frank Corbett Welch

Senator for King's, Nova Scotia
- In office September 25, 1962 – July 14, 1975
- Appointed by: John Diefenbaker

Personal details
- Born: July 14, 1900 Port Greville, Nova Scotia
- Died: September 3, 1986 (aged 86)
- Party: Progressive Conservative

Frank Corbett Welch (July 14, 1900 – September 3, 1986) was a Canadian exporter, farmer, horticulturist, and Senator.

Born Port Greville, Nova Scotia, he owned and operated his own fruit farm for forty years. He was also president of the Nova Scotia Progressive Conservative Association for ten years. He served on the town council of Wolfville, Nova Scotia for fifteen years and was deputy mayor for ten of them. In 1962, he was summoned to the Canadian senate representing the senatorial division of King's, Nova Scotia. A Progressive Conservative, he resigned on his 75th birthday in 1975.
