= William Petten =

Canadian politician

The Honourable William John Petten

Senator for Bonavista, Newfoundland and Labrador
- In office 1968–1998
- Appointed by: Lester B. Pearson

Personal details
- Born: January 28, 1923 St. John's, Newfoundland
- Died: March 6, 1999 (aged 76)
- Party: Liberal
- Relations: Ray Petten, father

William John Petten (January 28, 1923 – March 6, 1999) was a Canadian politician.

Born in St. John's, Newfoundland, he was the son of Ray Petten, chief fundraiser of Joey Smallwood's Newfoundland Confederate Association and subsequently a member of the Canadian Senate.

William Petten was a customs broker for fish exporters before being appointed to the Senate of Canada in 1968. A Liberal, he represented the senatorial division of Bonavista, Newfoundland and Labrador. He retired on his 75th birthday in 1998. He twice was the Government Whip in the Senate (1974–1979 and 1980–1984) and twice the Opposition Whip in the Senate (1979-1980 and 1985–1991).

In 2000, the Petten Building, the Newfoundland and Labrador provincial fisheries and aquaculture building in St. John's, was named after the late William J. Petten.
