= James Duggan (politician) =

Canadian politician

James Duggan (September 18, 1903 – August 13, 1980) was a union leader and politician who was described by Joey Smallwood as one of the earliest and staunchest supporters of Newfoundland's entry into Canada.

Duggan was born in Riverhead, Newfoundland Colony. At the age of 17 he obtained a job with the Reid Newfoundland Company as a railway telegrapher and also worked as a station agent and dispatcher. He became active as a trade unionist at the age of 20 and, in 1939, became general chairman of the Order of Railroad Telegraphers. In the 1940s he was a prominent member of the Newfoundland Confederate Association which promoted union with Canada. After Newfoundland joined confederation in 1949, the Confederate Association reorganized itself as the Newfoundland Liberal Party.

He was named to the Senate of Canada in 1966 by Prime Minister Lester Pearson and retired from the body in 1978.
