= Higher education in Prince Edward Island =

University of Prince Edward Island
- Motto: Faith, Knowledge, Service
- Type: Public university
- Established: 1969
- Affiliations: WUN; Association of Atlantic Universities, Maritimes Provinces Higher Education Commission; ACU; CIS; UACC; AUS
- Chancellor: Don McDougall
- President: Alaa Abd-El-Aziz (July 1, 2011)
- Faculty: 200
- Undergraduates: Full 3,260, part 540
- Postgraduates: Full 150, part 80
- Location: Charlottetown, Prince Edward Island, Canada
- Website: http://www.upei.ca

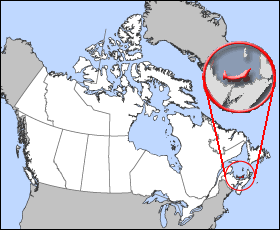
Prince Edward Island

Holland College
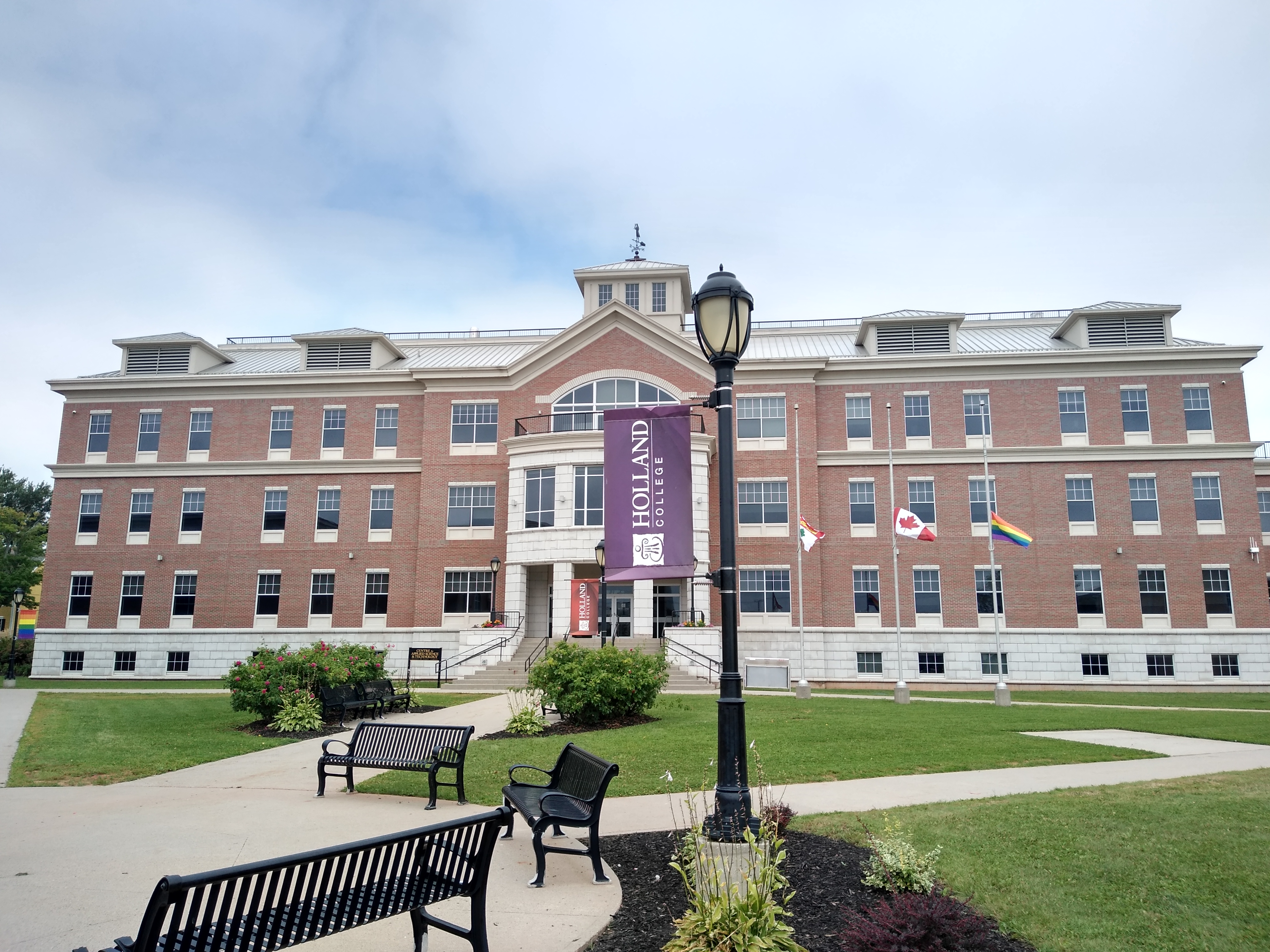
- Holland College, Charlottetown
- Motto: Get ready for life
- Type: Public community college
- Established: 1969
- Affiliations: ACCC, Maritimes Provinces Higher Education Commission, CCAA
- President: Dr. Brian McMillan
- Administrative staff: 435
- Location: Charlottetown, Prince Edward Island, Canada
- Campus: Charlottetown and Summerside, Tignish, and Georgetown, Montague, Souris
- Website: www.hollandcollege.com

Higher education in Prince Edward Island (also referred to as post-secondary education) refers to education provided by higher education institutions in the Canadian province of Prince Edward Island. In Canada, education is the responsibility of the provinces and there is no Canadian federal ministry governing education. Prince Edward Island has two post-secondary institutions authorized to grant degrees: one university, the University of Prince Edward Island, and one college, Maritime Christian College. There are also two community colleges: Holland College, which operates centres across the province, and Collège de l'Île, which offers post secondary education in French. The governing body for higher education in Prince Edward Island is the Department of Innovation and Advanced Learning, headed by the Minister of Innovation and Advanced Learning, the Honourable Allen Roach.

== History ==
=== Pre-1900 ===
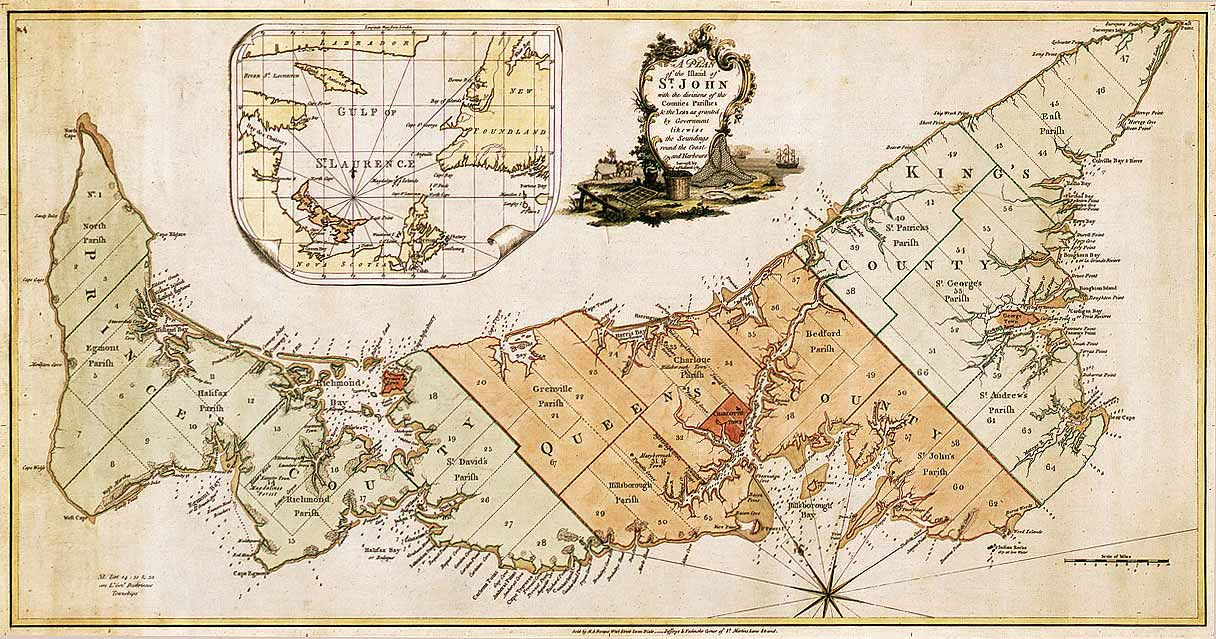
Prince Edward Island map, 1765

The government of the Crown Colony of Prince Edward Island identified post-secondary (or higher) education as being necessary to ensure the success of regional industry, specifically fishing, agriculture and commerce as early as 1790. The concept of public education was a new one to Charlottetown, the colony's main settlement with a population of approximately 400 people. Until this time, those who were sufficiently affluent sent their children abroad to study; those parents who could not afford a private education schooled their children themselves in the fundamentals of reading, writing and arithmetic.

In 1804 then Lieutenant-Governor, Edmund Fanning, donated two blocks of his personal property to the Crown to establish an educational institution. It was nearly two decades later that construction of Kent College School began, and the National School, as it was more commonly known, began operation as the first public school in the Colony in Charlottetown in 1821.

It was not until 1825 that the first official legislation was passed by the local assembly to foster higher education. The Act for the Encouragement of Education in the Different Counties and Districts of the Island was the first of a series of education acts developed to establish a Government-supported public university. In 1834, the Central Academy was founded by Royal Charter of King William IV as a training institution to keep up with the demand for teachers as a result of the expansion in population. Reverend Charles Lloyd, an Anglican minister, was appointed Principal when the first class commenced in 1836. In 1860, the Academy was renamed Prince of Wales College in honour of a visit of the future King Edward VII. With the opening of the Central Academy and St. Andrew's College, the island had two government-supported institutions of higher education firmly established in the region.

The Free Education Act passed in 1852 was in response for a desire of providing free education. The significance of this act was that it was not only the forerunner of establishing school districts, but that it also established that the Colonial government would pay the salaries of teachers. At the time of its enactment, it enabled greater access to free education than was available in Britain. In 1854, Saint Dunstan's University (SDU) was founded by the Roman Catholic diocese of Charlottetown as a seminary, but by the mid-20th century had expanded into a small liberal arts university. From 1890 to 1917, SDU had partnered with Laval University in Quebec and awarded joint degrees. This partnership remained intact until 1956 despite SDU receiving a degree-granting charter of its own from the provincial legislature in 1917; however, it did not award its first bachelor's degrees until the spring 1941 convocation.

At the Charlottetown Conference in 1864, representatives from the British North America colonies - Nova Scotia, New Brunswick, Prince Edward Island and the Province of Canada - gathered to discuss Confederation. In 1867, the British North America Act, 1867 was passed by the British government and then given the Queen's assent. It established Confederation and outlined division of responsibility between the provincial and federal governments in several areas, including education. Prince Edward Island entered confederation on July 1, 1873 and joined the Dominion of Canada.

=== 1900 to 1950 ===
At the start of the 20th century, education was receiving strong support from the provincial government; 40% of the provincial budget was assigned to support education. At the time, this was an unprecedented level of funding and considered far more advanced than even Great Britain. With a growing population, a need to expand agricultural education was soon felt to reduce the reliance on imported food. In 1905, wealthy philanthropist Sir William Macdonald, responded to this call for educational reform by sponsoring schools that focused on applied training; Macdonald Consolidated Schools were opened in Nova Scotia, Ontario and New Brunswick in 1903 and in 1905 at Mt. Herbert, Prince Edward Island.

Unrest in Europe would soon affect the new Dominion of Canada. When Great Britain declared war on Germany in 1914, Canada was automatically included as its foreign affairs were still controlled by the British Government. Besides the obvious loss of university-aged young men to fighting, economically it was crippling as income tax was introduced as a "temporary measure" to help pay for the war effort. As a post-war rehabilitation measure, the Dominion Government agreed to provide $10,000,000 in support of technical education in an effort to bolster the economy of the country. In PEI, the focus was still on agrarian needs and the Prince Edward Island Agricultural and Technical School was opened in 1920. The school was short-lived as it ceased operation in 1925.

After the collapse of the western economies in the 1930s, there was little money available to support postsecondary education as Canada was also thrown into severe economic depression. Canada committed to supporting Great Britain in World War II and by the time Germany surrendered in 1945, approximately ten percent of the eleven million Canadians had served in the armed forces, and of those, 45,000 had been killed. There was a recognition that many more skilled workers were needed.

=== 1960s to the present ===
The provincial government began to acknowledge the serious shortage of skilled workers by the 1960s and financial support for vocational and technical education; as a result, in 1969, Holland College, a public community college created to provide programs in applied arts and technology, vocational training and adult education, was opened by an act of Legislature in order to provide new postsecondary educational choices to PEI residents.

In 1965, Provincial Legislature passed the Prince of Wales College Act which provided it with degree-granting status. By 1969, Legislature passed another act calling for the amalgamation of St. Dunstan's and Prince of Wales Colleges and the incorporation of the University of Prince Edward Island.

Maritime Provinces Higher Education Commission(MPHEC)is created in 1974 to assist Prince Edward Island, New Brunswick and Nova Scotia and their institutions in attaining a more efficient and effective utilization and allocation of higher education resources.

Atlantic Veterinary College opened in 1986 at University of Prince Edward Island as the only veterinary college in the Maritimes.

The Societé Educative de I'lle-du-Prince-Eduoard opened its doors in 1995 as the first Francophone post-secondary institution in Prince Edward Island at Wellington. Its purpose is to serve as a French Training Centre in partnership with Université Sainte-Anne in Nova Scotia and Université de Moncton in New Brunswick.

University of Prince Edward Island committed to recognizing credits of first and second year courses earned at other Canadian universities in 1995, which significantly improved accessibility for students from Holland College transferring to a university program at UPEI as well as accessibility for out of province students to transfer to the university.

Maritime Provinces Higher Education Commission Act was passed in 2005. Ratified by the Council of Maritime Premiers, the act defined the mandate of the commission as both improving and providing the best possible service to students as lifelong learners in the provinces of New Brunswick, Nova Scotia and Prince Edward Island.

== Structure ==
=== Governance ===
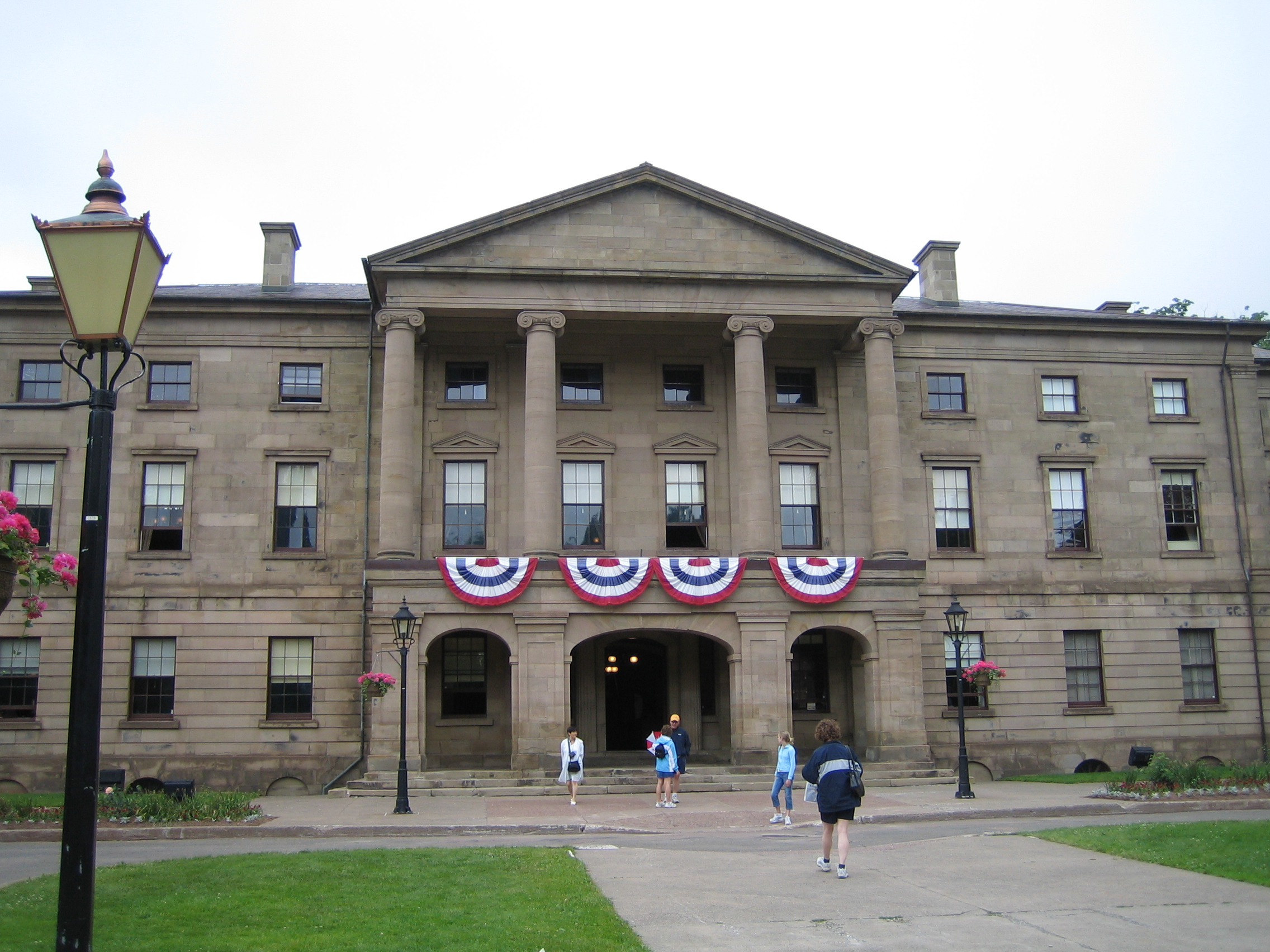
Province House, Charlottetown

==== Department of Education and Early Childhood Development ====
Higher education in PEI falls under the jurisdiction of the Department of Education and Early Childhood Development. The Department has two divisions: the Public Education Branch and the Higher Education and Corporate Services Branch. The Higher Education and Corporate Services Branch is responsible also for Continuing Education and Training.

=== Higher education institutions ===
Prince Edward Island has three publicly funded institutions: Holland College, Collège de l'Île (formerly Collège Acadie Î.-P.-É.), and the University of Prince Edward Island. All three are publicly funded institutions that enjoy a high level of institutional autonomy in establishing admission requirements, tuition and governance.

==== Holland College ====
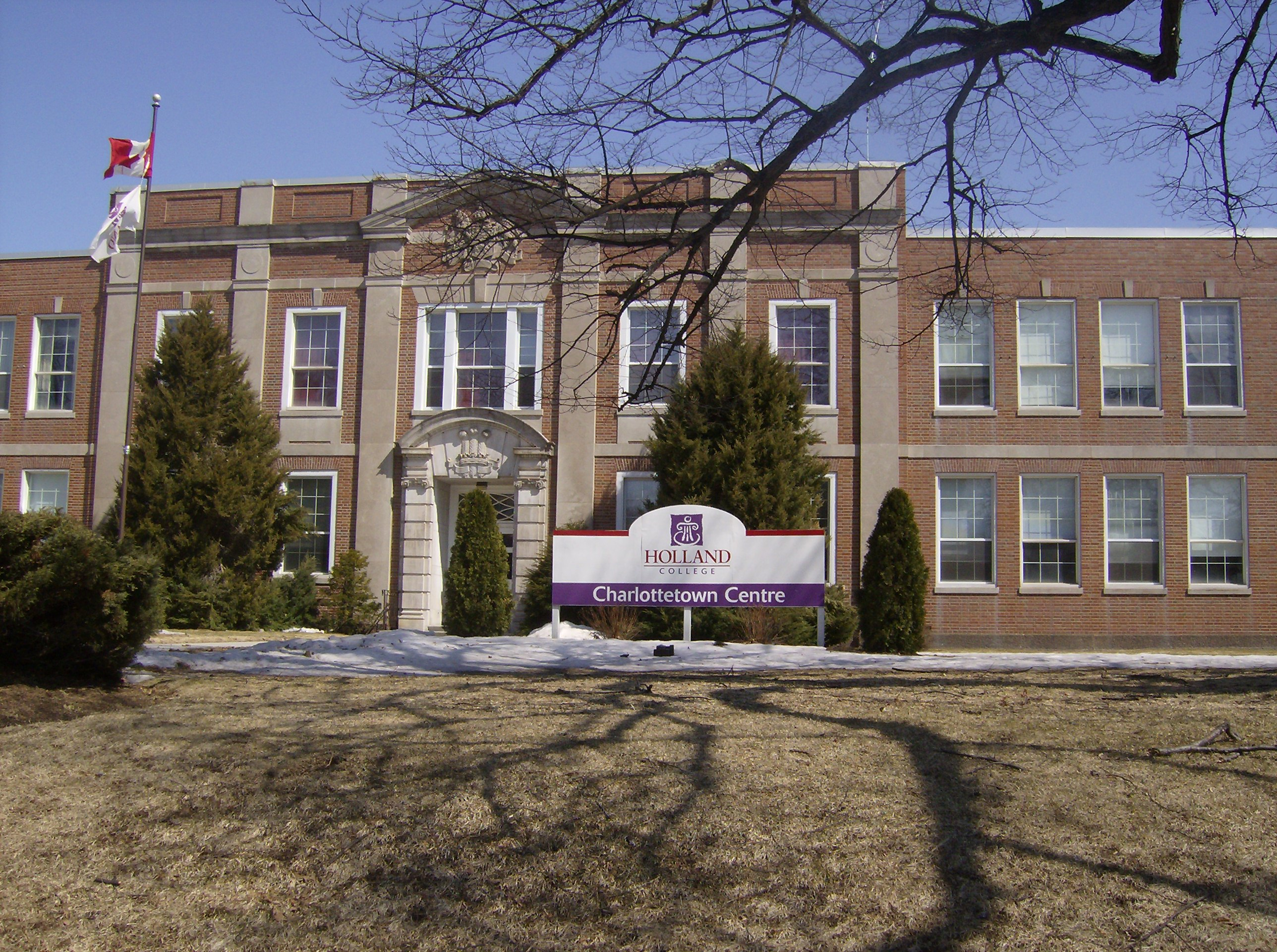
Holland College, Charlottetown Centre.

Holland College, created by the Act to Establish Holland College in 1969, is mainly a vocational school. Instead of having only one site, the college has responded to the geographical needs of the province by establishing numerous centers across it. The Culinary Institute of Canada, the Aerospace Centre, the Justice Institute of Canada, the Atlantic Tourism and Hospitality Institute (ATHI), the Marine Centre, and the PEI Institute of Adult and Community Education, are all strongly supported by local industry. Joint degree and 2+2 programs offered at Holland College help students articulate their credits when transferring to another institution.

Most programs offered by Holland College require students to complete an unpaid practicum as part of the program requirements, ensuring that each student has been provided with an opportunity to apply newly acquired skills in a work environment.

Admission requirements are the same for international students as well as Canadian applicants in that a high school diploma or equivalent is required, although international students are required to pay a $3,000 "International Student Fee" in addition to tuition. Priority for admission is first given to provincial residents, other Canadian applicants second, and thirdly to international applicants.

==== Collège de l'Île ====
The province and la Société Éducative de I'Île-du-Prince-Édouard cooperated in the establishment of a French Training Centre on PEI, which delivered programs offered by Le Collège de l'Acadie, Nouvelle-Écosse and l'Université de Moncton, Nouveau-Brunswick. The agreement worked to provide PEI francophones with access to adult education and training programs in French, operate an adult training centre that provided professional development, personal interest, literacy, and general training courses in French and assist in community development by offering leadership and other training programs in French. This eventually developed into a full-fledged partnership that established a campus of Collège de l'Acadie in Wellington.

However, in 2003, the Nova Scotia operations of Collège de l'Acadie were merged into the Université Sainte-Anne which is headquartered at Pointe-de-l'Église, Nova Scotia. The PEI operations continued under the name Collège Acadie Î.-P.-É and subsequently Collège de l'Île. Collège de l'Île does not have an Act of its own, differentiating it from Holland College and UPEI. Rather, it operates under a Memorandum of Agreement with the government of PEI, originally signed on 23 June 2008.

The college now has three campuses, the main campus in Wellington, and two satellite campuses in DeBlois et Charlottetown. Currently, the college offers vocational programmes in areas such as practical nursing, accounting clerkship, and early childhood education. It also offers language training in English and in French.

==== University of Prince Edward Island ====
The University of Prince Edward Island (UPEI) is located in the provincial capital of Charlottetown, a city with a population of 32,000. In 1965, Provincial Legislature had given Prince of Wales College degree-granting status, yet by 1969, Legislature passed another act calling for the amalgamation of St. Dunstan's and Prince of Wales Colleges and the incorporation of the University of Prince Edward Island. UPEI offers undergraduate, graduate and professional programs in four faculties (Arts, Education, Sciences, and Veterinary Medicine) and two schools (Business and Nursing.) It provides undergraduate and graduate education, professional education, and research.

The university has full autonomy over admissions and all other matters pertaining to academics. It has become home to an increasing number of international students and offers access to formal exchanges and co-op and internship programs with international partner universities. The University of Prince Edward Island has the authority to set its own policies and requirements for admission, but generally, Canadian applicants to UPEI must have completed a high school diploma or its equivalent. Rules governing UPEI are outlined in the University Act, 1969.

In 1986, UPEI opened the Atlantic Veterinary College (AVC) on its main campus, which offers the only veterinary medicine program in the Maritime provinces. AVC offers graduate study in the Faculty of Veterinary Medicine.

==== Privately funded institutions ====
The Maritime Christian College, a privately funded religious school, is the only degree-granting institution in the province other than the University of Prince Edward Island; it is also governed by the University Act.

Additionally, PEI has provincially regulated private training schools, or career colleges, which offer postsecondary vocational training designed to prepare students for employment through employment training in a wide range of occupations. There are approximately 20 private training schools registered with the province. Private schools offer employment training in a wide range of occupations. Schools are privately owned and operate as a business.

Schools that offer career vocational training and which operate in Prince Edward Island must register under the province's Private Training School Act.

=== Associations ===
==== Association of Atlantic Universities (AAU) ====
Established in 1964, the Association of Atlantic Universities is a voluntary association of the 17 universities in the Atlantic region and in the West Indies which offer programmes leading to a degree or have degree-granting status. One of the fundamental roles of the association is to create greater awareness and understanding of the important contribution of universities to the social and economic development of the Atlantic Provinces. The Association's business is conducted by the AAU Council, which consists of the executive heads of all the member institutions. The AAU currently meets two times a year and is served by a permanent secretariat. The activities of the Association are funded principally through annual membership fees based on the operating income of the member institutions.

==== Council of Atlantic Ministers of Education and Training (CAMET) ====
The Atlantic ministers responsible for education and training signed an agreement in April 2004 under which the provinces of New Brunswick, Newfoundland and Labrador, Nova Scotia, and Prince Edward Island agreed to collaborate on joint undertakings to respond to the needs identified in public and post-secondary education. CAMET is dedicated to further enhancing the level of cooperation in public and post-secondary education by working on common issues to improve learning for all Atlantic Canadians, optimize efficiencies and bring added value to provincial initiatives and priorities.

==== Maritime Provinces Higher Education Commission (MPHEC) ====
The MPHEC was created in 1974 to assist Prince Edward Island, New Brunswick and Nova Scotia and their institutions in attaining a more efficient and effective utilization and allocation of higher education resources. It provides quality assurance, data and information sharing, cooperative action, and regional programmes as well as specific services to one or more provinces or institutions as agreed to by the Ministers of Education.

== Funding ==
Incremental (or historical) funding is the dominant funding mechanism in Prince Edward Island. Provincial government grants have traditionally been the largest single source of revenue for post secondary institutions. Almost half of university and college revenues in fiscal 2004/05 were in the form of provincial operating and capital grants. The most notable feature of this is the dramatic decline in the proportional contribution of provincial governments to total post secondary education revenues since 1990/91. In almost all provinces, this has coincided with significant increases in the share of revenues provided by tuition fees.

Tuition for Prince Edward Island's post secondary intuitions are set by the individual institutions, in consultation with the provincial government.

== Access ==
=== Participation ===
Participation in post secondary education in the Maritimes is higher than the national average, with approximately a 30% participation rate in Prince Edward Island (PEI) while Canada as a whole hovers around 20-26%. However, the population of 18- to 24-year-olds in PEI and the rest of the Maritime provinces are predicted to decline at a greater rate than the rest of Canada; undergraduate participation peaked in PEI and Nova Scotia during the 2004–2005 academic session, and in 2003–2004 in New Brunswick. Between 1990 and 2000, the number of 18- to 24-year-olds dropped 13% in the Maritimes, while the rest of Canada dropped less than 1%. Unlike the rest of the Maritime provinces, enrolment in community college education in PEI dropped from 12.6% to 11.5%, however the proportion of male students at Holland College increased from 52% to 56%.

Some of the factors leading to a decline in university participation include:

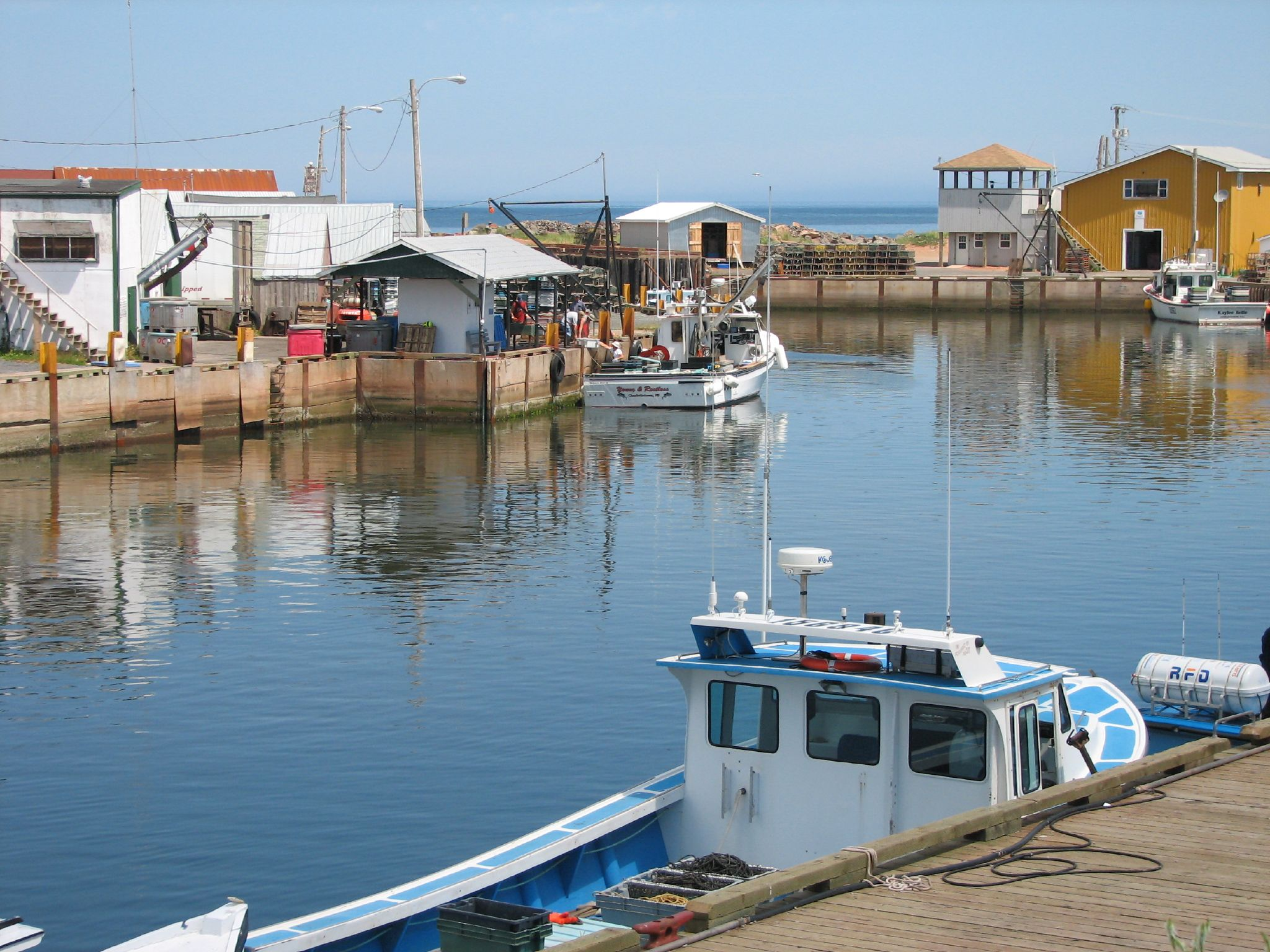
Fisheries form one of the major industries of Prince Edward Island.

- Strong economy that encourages students to enter the labour force early
- Out-migration of students from the Maritimes

The number of international students has tripled in PEI over the last 10 years. The number of graduate students at universities in the Maritimes has increased by more than 30 per cent over the last 10 years because universities here have been developing more post-graduate programs.

Although UPEI has one of the lowest tuition rates across Canada and the lowest in the Maritimes, more students left the province to attend university than any other in the Maritimes; there was no significant distinction in the number of female versus male students leaving the province to study. The projected demographic changes are expected to heavily influence the rate of participation in post secondary education, specifically at the university level. The out-migration of the university age population (18-24) from Prince Edward Island since 1981 reached 3.6% by the year 2007. It is anticipated that the demographic decline of the university age population in the Maritime provinces will be affecting enrolment as early as the fall of 2009, with an overall reduction of 10% by the year 2018.

Adult education in the province has expanded and incorporated a variety of programs for both academic credit and non-credit (general interest courses and programs). Recognizing the unique needs of some learners, provisions have been made to facilitate the "postsecondary education of women, Native people, economically disadvantaged groups, disabled, senior citizens, visible minorities, immigrants and those living in remote areas".

Identifying the importance of a skilled workforce, Workplace Learning programs enable workers to ensure their skills are kept up-to-date. Although developing stronger literacy skills is the main priority of these programs, the skills taught are a reflection of the workplace needs and are tailored to the skill levels of the participants.

=== Mobility between institutions ===
The University of Prince Edward Island "adheres to the Pan-Canadian Protocol on the Transferability of University Credits, which states that all course work completed by transfer students during the first two years of university study in Canada (including the final year of studies in Quebec leading to a diploma of college studies and the university transfer courses offered by community colleges and university colleges in British Columbia and Alberta) will be recognized and fully credited for the purposes of granting a degree".

To ensure smooth access both within and outside of the province, several transfer credit and articulated agreements have been reached between the province's post secondary institutions and those housed in regions outside of the province. Examples of these include:

- Credit Transfer: The Atlantic Tourism and Hospitality Institute has transfer arrangements with the University of Prince Edward Island; University of New Brunswick, Saint John; University of Calgary; University College of the Cariboo; and Athabasca University.
- Block Transfer: Graduates of the Environmental Technology (ET) and Renewable Resource Management Technology (RRMT) programs offered by Holland College can receive credit towards certain B.Sc. programs at the University of Prince Edward Island.
- Articulated Programs: An integrated Dietetic Internship Program and the Applied B.Sc. in Radiography are offered jointly by UPEI and Queen Elizabeth Hospital. Students study at UPEI for one year then spend their second and third years of study at the hospital, then return to the university for their final year. Students have the option of completion only three years of study and earning a diploma.

At the college level, the Atlantic Community College Consortium (ACCC) in 2000 signed a Memorandum of Understanding on College Transfer Credit that ensures student mobility and facilitates lifelong learning.

=== Financial aid ===
Student loans programs

Full-time student loan funding in Prince Edward Island is based on two programs, the Canada Student Loans Program and the Prince Edward Island Student Loans Program. Students enrolled in at least 60% of a full-time programs are eligible to receive up to $210/week from the Federal program and $165/week from the provincial program.

Millennium access bursaries in Prince Edward Island

The Canada Millennium Scholarship Foundation was established in 2005 to provide support to students with demonstrated financial need. The millennium access bursaries have been distributed in the form of grants to single, dependent, low-income students. There are two groups of eligible students: those who began post-secondary studies during the 2005/06 academic year, and those who began studies in 2006/07. Millennium access bursaries are not available to students who have enrolled after the end of the 2006/07 academic year. Eligible students were able to receive a $1,000 grant in their first year of study, $2,200 in the second year, and $1,800 in the third. Students must have been enrolled full-time in undergraduate studies that lead to a degree, certificate or diploma in a program of at least two years in length. Students who qualify for financial assistance from Prince Edward Island Student Financial Services will be automatically considered for a cash grant of $1,000.

George Coles Bursary

The George Coles Bursary is valued at up to $2,200 and is provided by the Government of Prince Edward Island. The George Coles Bursary is available to first time, first year student residents of Prince Edward Island enrolled in full-time studies at the University of Prince Edward Island, Holland College, Collège Acadie Î.-P-É. or the Maritime Christian College, who do not have any previous post-secondary education.

=== Distance education ===
Recognizing a need that not all students are able to attend college or university, there are some skills-based training programs available through both distance and open learning formats; UPEI, Holland College, Mount St. Vincent, and Université Sainte-Anne Campus de Wellington all offer programs via distance learning.

=== Lifelong learning ===
Access to higher education for citizens over the age of fifty was improved with the establishment of Seniors College, which is operated in affiliation with UPEI. In an attempt to overcome the obstacles arising from the province's geography, the college offers programs at various locations province-wide. Additionally, UPEI has also opened The Lifelong Learning Center which provides public adult education programs. Holland College also offers evening programmes at many of its various locations for individuals who are unable to attend those held during daytime.

== See also ==
- List of schools in Prince Edward Island
- List of school districts in Prince Edward Island
- List of universities in Canada
- List of colleges in Canada
- List of business schools in Canada
- List of law schools in Canada
- List of Canadian universities by endowment
- Higher education in Canada
- Demographics of Canada
- Statistics Canada
