= Higher education in Nova Scotia =

Post-secondary education in Canadian province

Province of Nova Scotia

Higher education in Nova Scotia (also referred to as post-secondary education) refers to education provided by higher education institutions. In Canada, education is the responsibility of the provinces and there is no Canadian federal ministry governing education. Nova Scotia has a population of one million people, but is home to ten public universities and the Nova Scotia Community College, which offers programs at 13 locations.

== Locations and affiliations ==
Six of the 10 universities – Atlantic School of Theology, Dalhousie University, Mount Saint Vincent University, the NSCAD University, Saint Mary's University, and the University of King's College – are located in the Halifax Regional Municipality, which is the capital of Nova Scotia and the largest urban area in the Atlantic Canada region. The oldest university in the province is the University of King's College, established in 1789, and the newest university is Cape Breton University, established in 1974. In 2012–2013, Nova Scotia had 45,504 full-time and 9,510 part-time students enrolled in the province's colleges and universities.

Several universities in Nova Scotia have strong religious connections. The University of King's College, first founded in Windsor, holds the distinction of being the first college with university powers in British North America, at a time when Upper Canada had no government of its own. It has always remained under the control of the Church of England. Dalhousie University, first known as Dalhousie College, was established in Halifax in 1820 with the help of the Presbyterian Church, and Acadia University was founded by Baptists. Catholics formed both Saint Mary's University and Saint Francis Xavier University.

== Governance of the higher education system ==
The governing body for higher education in Nova Scotia is the Ministry of Labour and Advanced Education, of which Kelly Regan is Minister of Labour and Advanced Education.

The Higher Education Branch of this body "supports the development of a highly qualified workforce to meet labour market demand as well as the cultivation of knowledgeable, engaged citizens." Under the Higher Education Branch, there are four divisions which support this mission:

1. Post-Secondary Disability Services Division
2. Private Career Colleges Division
3. Student Assistance Office
4. Universities and Colleges Division

The Post-Secondary Disability Services Division (PSDS) "assists students with permanent disabilities in achieving individual success in their post-secondary studies by reducing or removing educational-related barriers through the provision of grants, services and equipment."

The Private Career Colleges Division "works with private career colleges to ensure that Nova Scotians have access to training opportunities that respond to labour market needs and lead to employment."

The Student Assistance Office "provides an opportunity for all academically qualified Nova Scotians to have equity of access to quality post-secondary education and training. The program provides needs-based assistance to students who would be unable to attend post-secondary study because their family resources were not sufficient to cover their educational costs."

The mandates of the Division of Universities and Colleges of the Ministry of Labour and Advanced Education are as follows

- develops and manages funding agreements between the province and the public post-secondary institutions
- analyzes reports and publications to inform the Minister on policy issues
- conducts Nova Scotia-based higher education research through the Minister's Post-Secondary Education Research Advisory Panel
- represents the province at a regional and national level regarding post-secondary education issues.

== Institutional governance ==
Universities are autonomous entities incorporated by legislative Acts. Canadian higher education institutions have a common bicameral model of institutional governance including a corporate Board of Governors responsible for the institution's financial and administrative matters and a Senate with responsibilities for academic matters. The specific composition and authority of these two bodies are specified in the individual institutional Charters.

== History ==
=== Kings College (1789) ===
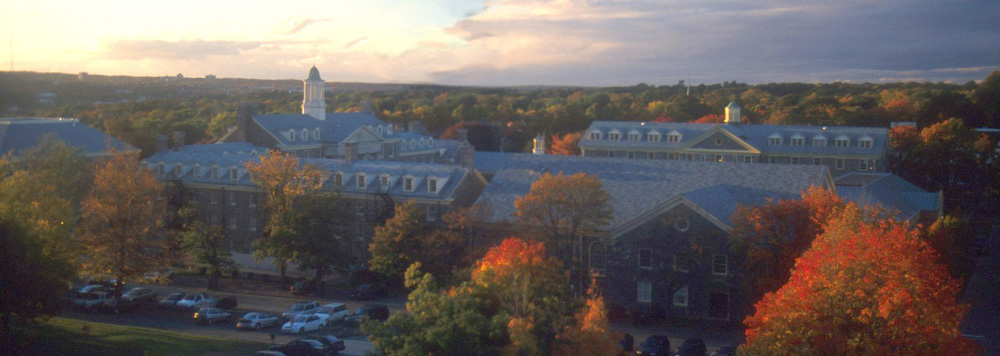
University of King's College in Autumn with Castine Way along the foreground.

In 1789, the University of King's College was founded by Anglican United Empire Loyalists in Windsor, Nova Scotia. It is Canada's first chartered university and the oldest English-speaking university in the Commonwealth outside of the United Kingdom. At the outset, King's College discouraged non-Anglicans from attending with Protestant and Catholic colleges emerging as a result. The first universities were intended primarily to preserve British traditions against American republicanism. Secondly, they were to educate clergymen. King's College would be granted its Royal Charter from King George III to grant degrees in 1802 and the first student graduated in 1807. The King's College, however, did not have a long lifespan and crumbled as a result of the war which gained America her independence from Britain. This college was later re-instated as Columbia University.

In 1920 the college burned down, and its future was uncertain. The Carnegie Foundation of New York offered the College a grant on the condition that the new King's College would be built in Halifax and would merge into a division of Dalhousie under the Arts and Sciences program. Additionally, the students and professors of both Universities would share campuses and work as a collaborative unit.

During the period of 1941–1945, this college undertook the task of training subjects for the Royal Canadian Navy, under, King George III, and the students were displaced to another facility in Halifax. This arrangement continued until 1971 when the King's Faculty of Divinity merged with the ecumenical Atlantic School of Theology in Halifax. But, over the next year, two national Canadian programs emerged: In 1972 the Foundation Year Programme was introduced, and in 1978 the first School of Journalism to grant degrees on the Atlantic coast of Canada was established.

=== Saint Mary's University (1802) ===
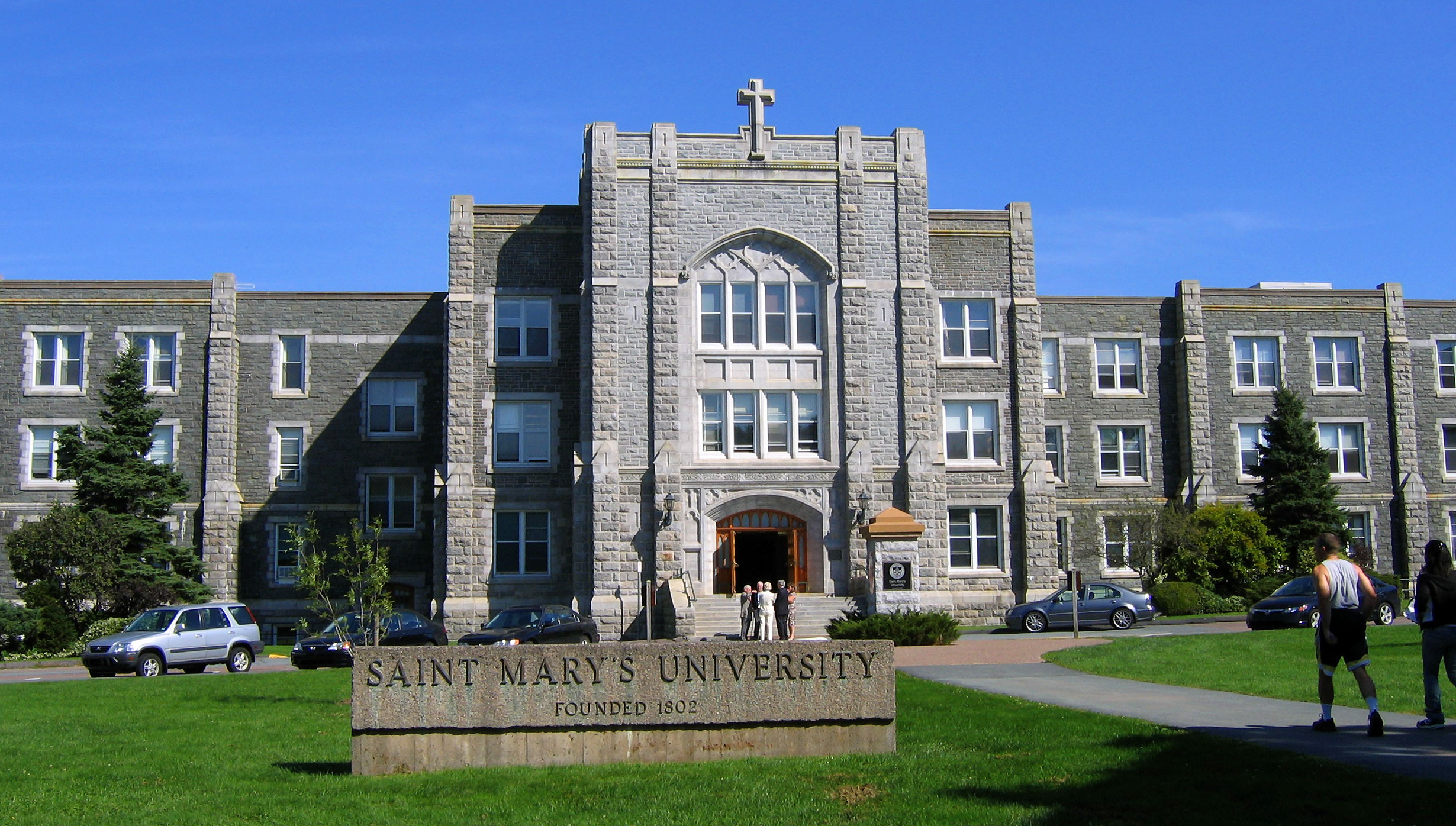
McNally Building at Saint Mary's University.

Saint Mary's University was the first English speaking Roman Catholic university to be established in Canada. It was founded in 1802 by two Irish priests, Reverends Dease and O'Brien. Peter McGuigan, The Intrigues of Archbishop John T McNally and the Rise of Saint Mary's University, Fernwood publishing 2010. On March 29, 1841, an act of the Legislature incorporated Saint Mary's which enabled degree-granting privileges for eleven years, and the act included a four-year annual grant of $1,622; then it received permanent power to confer degrees in 1852.

Closed in 1883 by Archbishop Cornelius O'Brien due to lack of provincial funding, Saint Mary's would re-open as a high school in 1903, mainly due to the efforts of the same Archbishop of Halifax, Archbishop O'Brien. Saint Mary's University again became degree granting in 1918 after the 1913 arrival of the Irish Christian Brothers at this Saint Mary's College. In 1940 a Jesuit leadership was established (McGuigan), and in 1970 the institution went public.

=== Dalhousie University (1818) ===
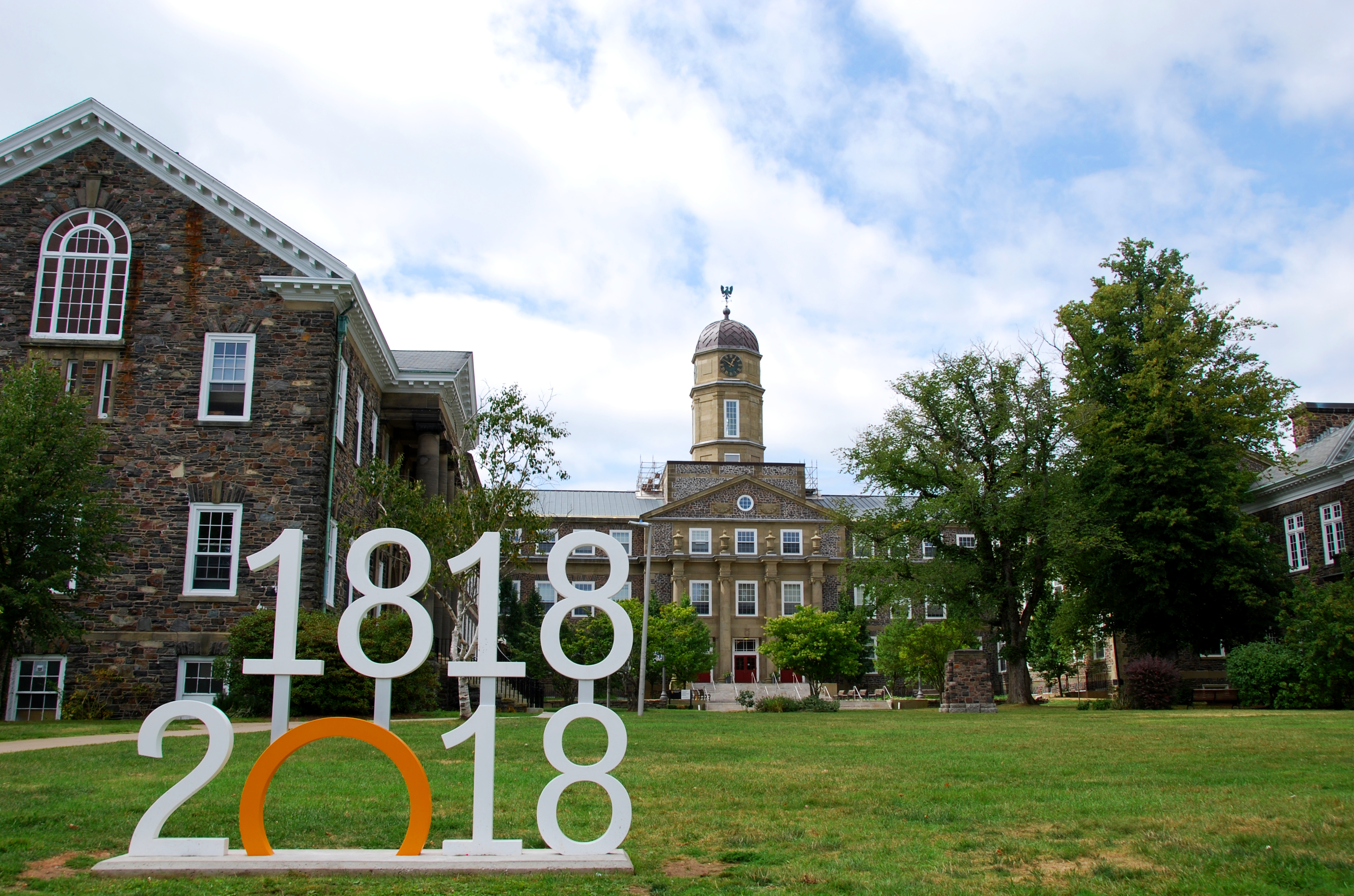
Henry Hicks Academic Administration Building at Dalhousie University.

Dalhousie University was founded in 1818 by Lord Dalhousie, who modeled the university on the University of Edinburgh, although instruction would not actually begin until 1838. Unfortunately, five years later, the university's first principal died and the university would remain closed until 1863, when it opened with six professors and one tutor. The Dalhousie University Act (1963) includes a suggestion of denominational representation on the Board of Governors in proportion to support of endowed chairs. By relying on private contributions, Dalhousie managed to avoid most of the instability of government grants and bureaucratic infighting.

Dalhousie University degrees were not awarded until 1866. There were only 28 students who were in the degree program during this period and another 28 who were casual students. The school was consumed with financial difficulties, and it wasn't until 1879 that a wealthy New York publisher with Nova Scotian ancestry made a donation of over 8 million dollars and saved the university.

During the 1900s the school expanded and on April 1, 1997, it merged with the Technical University of Nova Scotia (TUNS) and added a Faculty of Computer Science. Despite the merger it retained its name. In 2012, the University absorbed the Nova Scotia Agricultural College, which is now the University's Faculty of Agriculture. The campus remains at its original location just outside the town of Truro, and is now referred to as Dalhousie's Agricultural Campus. This merger added an additional 1, 000 students to Dalhousie's student population.

Dalhousie continues to expand and construction crews can be observed on its Studley campus. Some of its recently built facilities include: Goldberg Computer Science Building (1999), the Marion McCain Arts and Social Science Building (2001), the Kenneth C. Rowe Management Building (2005), the Mona Campbell Building (2010), the Ocean Services Building (2013) and LeMarchant Place opened in 2014. It boasts 100,000 graduates, and its milestone was achieved 140 years after it granted its first two Bachelor of Arts degrees to Joseph Henry Chase and Robert Shaw in 1866. In 1896 it was also the first university to award a law degree to a black man, James Robinson Johnston.

=== Acadia University (1838) ===
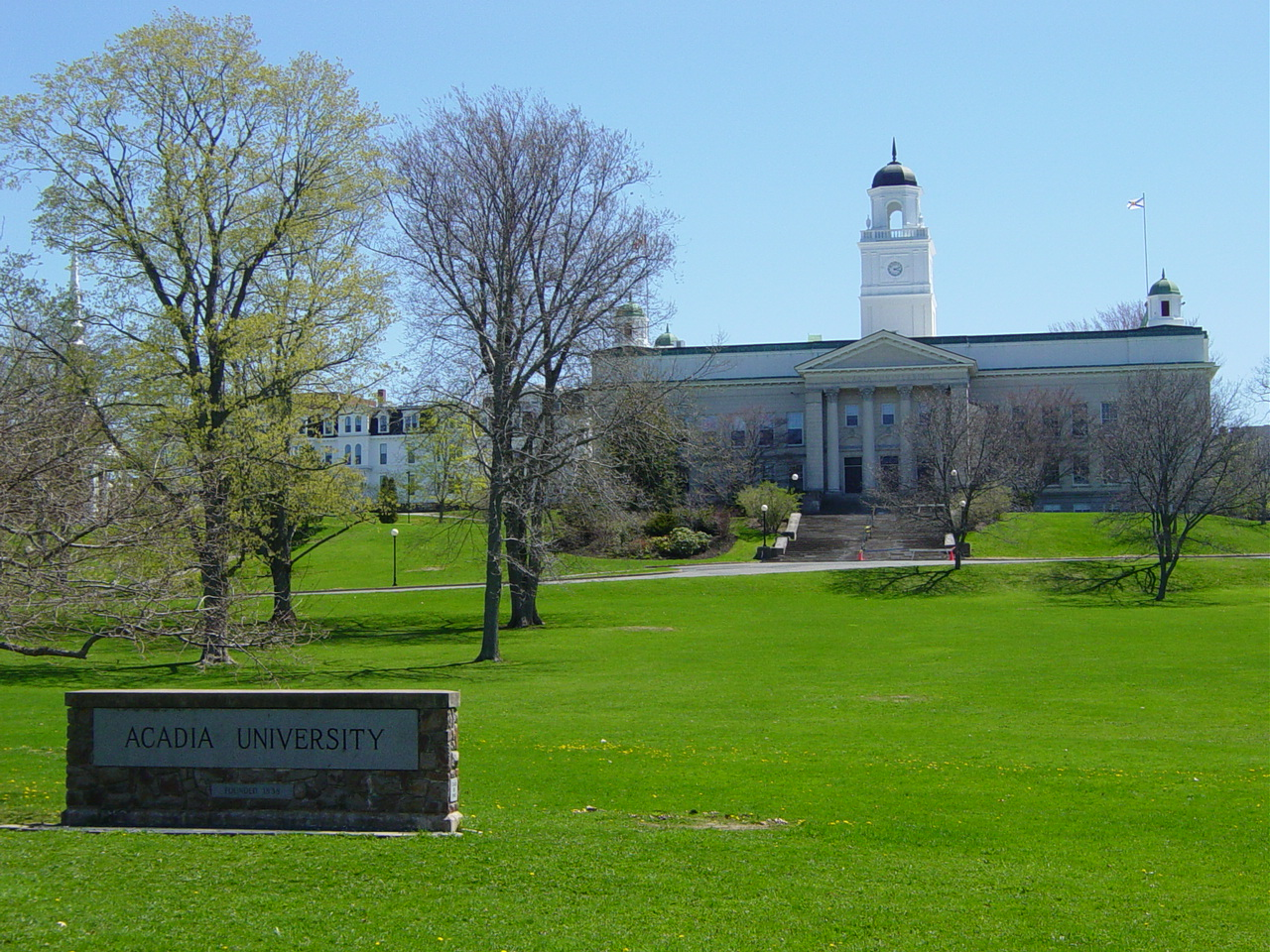
University Hall at Acadia University

After founding Horton Academy in the town of Wolfville, Nova Scotia in 1828, the same Baptist Education Society of Nova Scotia created Queen's College in 1838. The first students began in 1839 and 1843 saw four graduates emerge. It would be renamed Acadia College and receive its charter in 1841, finally becoming a full university in 1891. Acadia University also had an impact on the women's movement here in Canada, in 1884 Clara Belle Marshall (Raymond) was given the privilege to help lead the way for women's pursuit of university education in Canada by becoming one of the first few women to receive an undergraduate degree. Additionally, Acadia University was the first University to grant a degree to an African Canadian, by the name of Edwin Borden. The university is also well known for being one of the first post-secondary institutions. In 1996, the school introduced the use of computers into the learning environment of students and instructors.

=== St. Francis Xavier University (1853) ===
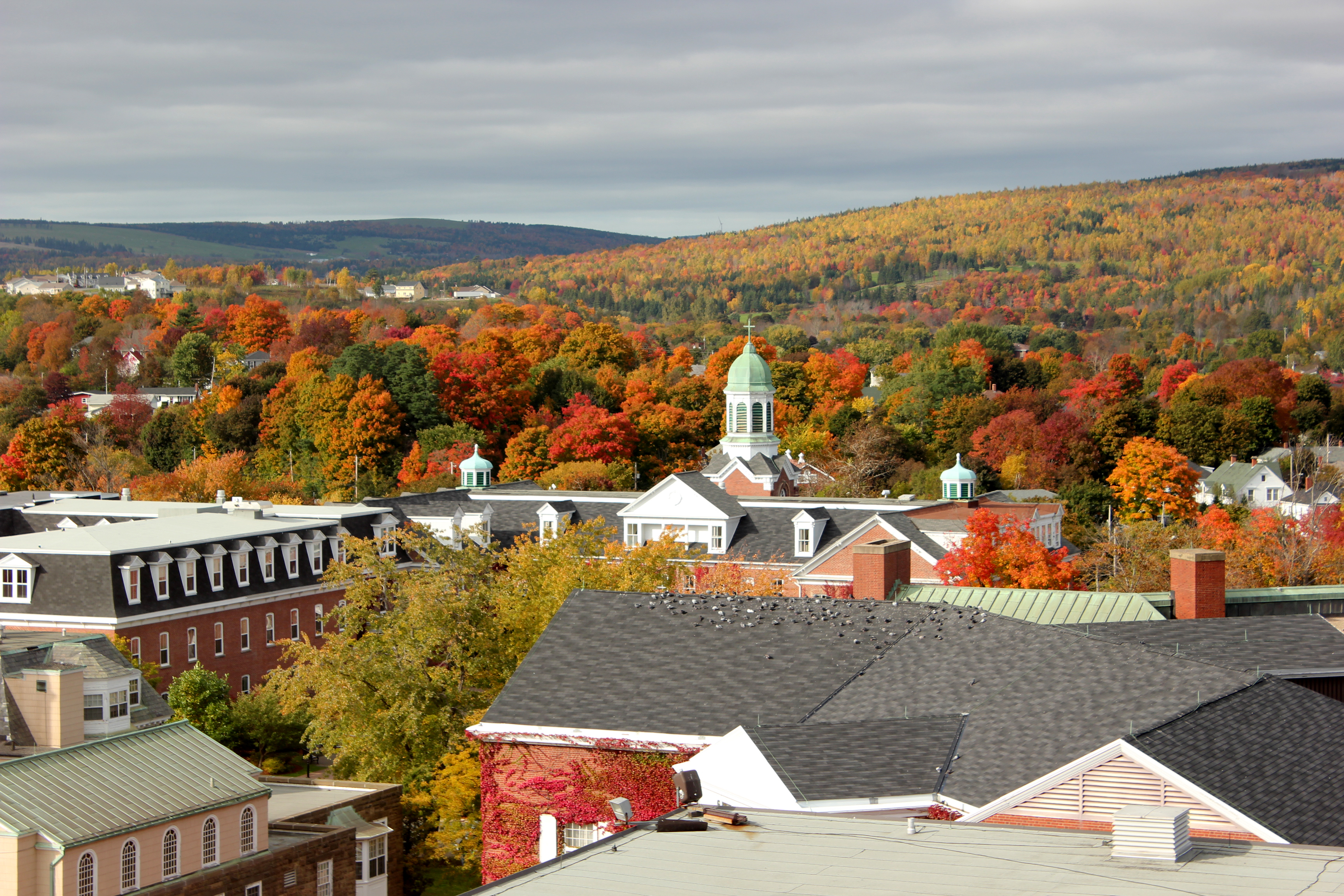
St. Francis Xavier University Lower Campus.

St Francis Xavier College was a Roman Catholic institution founded in 1853 in Arichat, Cape Breton, and moved to Antigonish in 1855. In 1866, it gained university status and was renamed St Francis Xavier University and awarded its first degrees in 1868. In 1883, its ladies' institution, Mount St Bernard Academy, was founded and in 1894, it was affiliated with St Francis as Mount St Bernard College becoming in 1897 the first co-educational Catholic university in North America to grant degrees to women.

The school's diversity was a founding feature because the school originated in a region in which a multitude of farmers, tradesman, and labourers immigrated from the British Isles and then intermingled with the native Indian and Acadian peoples who were already residents. As there were a number of people of the Scottish origin already established there, the Gaelic language played a prominent role in the university; this role continues today. Its principal goals are community outreach and society service. The 1930s, therefore, saw innovative initiatives by St. Francis Xavier University in the areas of adult education, cooperatives and credit unions given emphasis as paths "to social improvement and economic organization for disadvantaged groups in eastern Canada." The Antigonish Movement gave momentum to these programs, which reached out to the community.

In 1959, the Coady International Institute was established, and the former principles were made global. Its desire to promote social cohesion has become recognized through its students and successes. Although, many institutes of higher learning have evolved and changed the principles which they were founded on, St. Francis Xavier has held on to its core values over the years. While the university definitely aspires to evolve, it also wants to maintain the core principles with which it was established.

=== Mount Saint Vincent (1873) ===
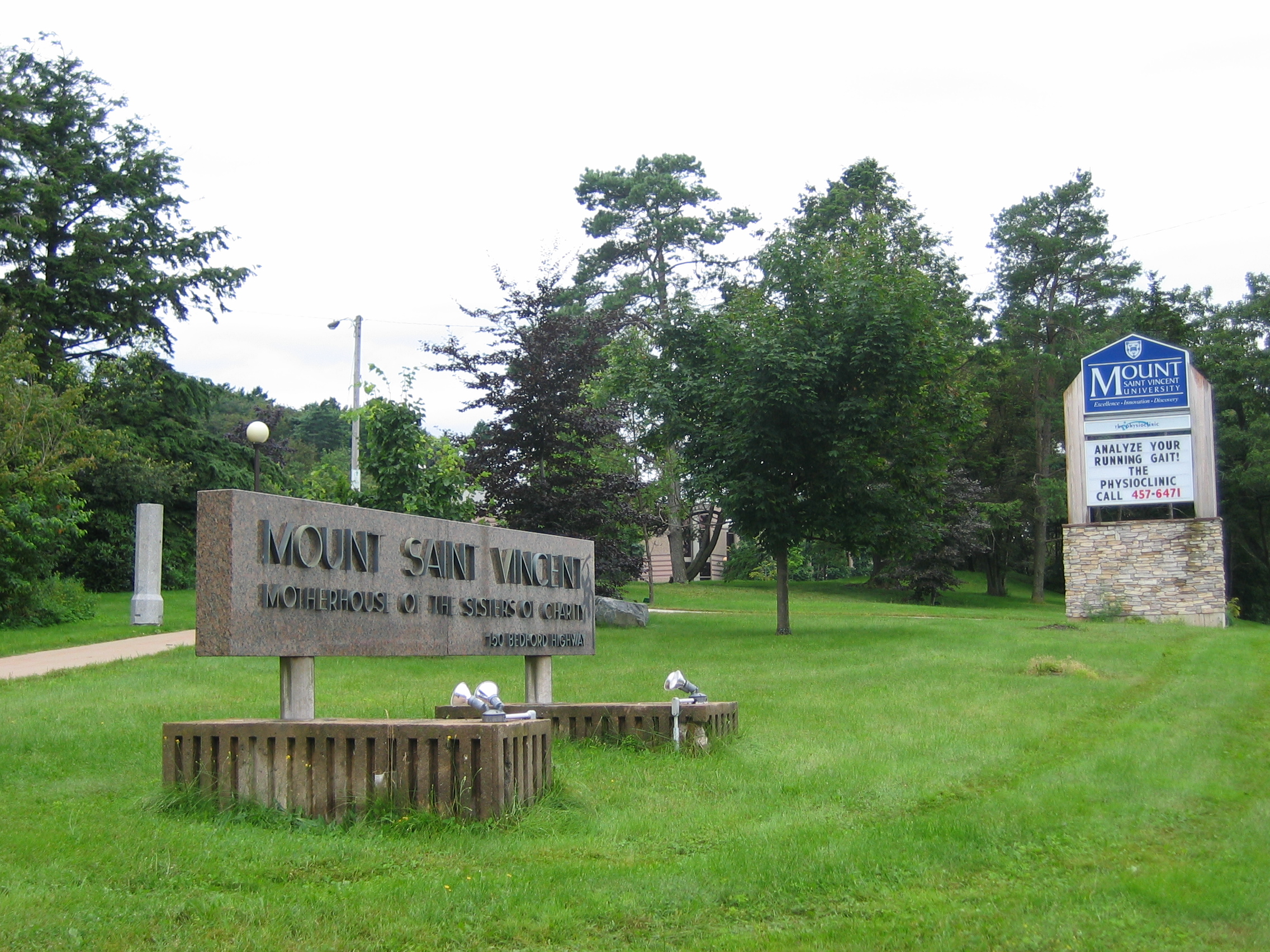
Mount Saint Vincent University Entrance from the Bedford Highway, Halifax.

Established by the Sisters of Charity in 1873, the Mount was one of the few institutions of higher education for women in Canada. At a time when women could not vote, the Mount provided an opportunity for women to learn and participate equally in society. In 1925, the Nova Scotia legislature gave Mount Saint Vincent College the right to grant degrees, making it the only independent women's college in the British Commonwealth.

=== The University of Halifax (1876–1881) ===
In 1876 the University Act was passed, stating that Dalhousie, King's, Mount Allison, Mount St. Vincent, and St. Mary's would be regarded as Colleges of the non-sectarian University of Halifax, and that each would confer their degrees in the name University of Halifax. It was meant to be an umbrella institution, like the University of London, England, wherein it would not offer instruction but would examine those who presented themselves for examination and conferred degrees if they were successful. The University of Halifax was never accepted by the other universities and it was abolished in 1881.

=== Nova Scotia College of Art and Design (1887) ===
Oscar Wilde's much-publicized lecture tour in 1882 stopped in Halifax, Nova Scotia, where he advocated the support of art education. Wilde's advocacy was a precursor to the foundation of the Victoria School of Art in 1887, which would be renamed the Nova Scotia College of Art in 1925 upon receiving its Provincial charter. Anna Leonowens, better known for her work as the tutor or governess to the King of Siam as portrayed in the book and film Anna and the King of Siam, along with a committee of citizens worked to found the school to commemorate Queen Victoria's Golden Jubilee. It would change its name again to the Nova Scotia College of Art and Design (NSCAD) in 1969 and finally to NSCAD University in 2003. NSCAD developed an international reputation with notable artists who lectured, taught, or collaborated alongside students and faculty including Joseph Beuys, Eric Fischl, Vito Acconci, Sol LeWitt, Michael Snow, Joyce Wieland, Hans Haacke, Claes Oldenburg, A.R. Penck, Krzysztof Wodiczko and John Baldessari.

=== Université Sainte-Anne (1890) ===
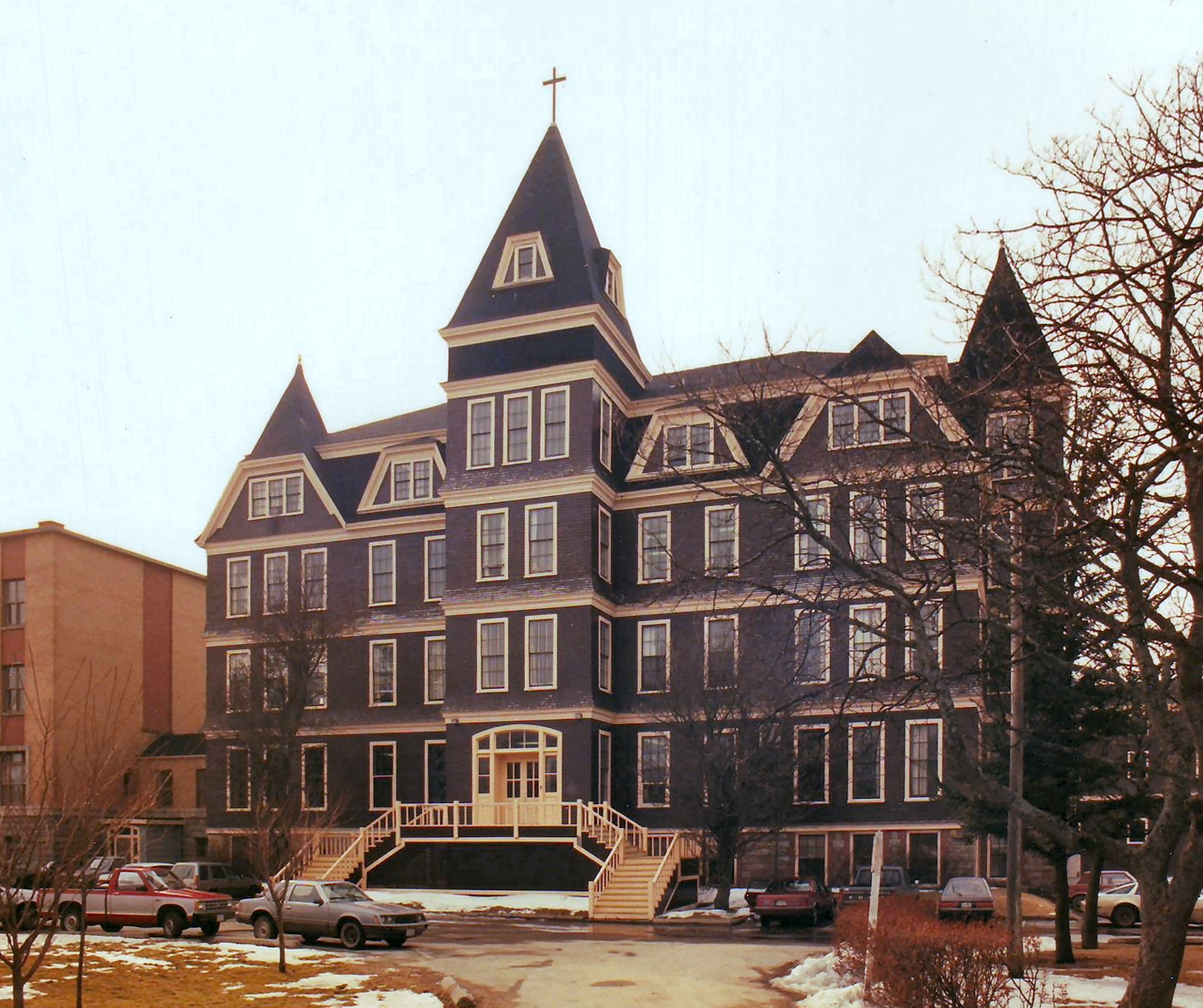
The main administration building at Université Sainte-Anne.

College Sainte-Anne was founded at Church Point in 1890 by the Eudist fathers. This French language institution received its Charter in 1892 and begin granting degrees in 1903. Now Université Sainte-Anne, it is Nova Scotia's only French language university. Université Stainte-Anne is also the provider of community college level programmes to Nova Scotia francophones. In 1988, the Collège de l'Acadie was established as the French-language counterpart to the NSCC.

However, in 2003, the Collège de l'Acadie was placed under the direction of Université Sainte-Anne, except for its PEI operations which became Collège Acadie Î.-P.-É.

=== Nova Scotia Agricultural College (1905–2012) ===
At the School of Agriculture, which was established in Truro, Nova Scotia in 1885, Professor H. Smith, was the first academic to conduct agricultural research in the Maritimes, funded by the government. In 1905, this school along with the Provincial Farm, established in 1889 at Bible Hill, and the School of Horticulture, established in 1894 at Wolfville, merged to form the Nova Scotia Agricultural College, which made it the third oldest centre for agricultural education and research in Canada. The new college would work to prepare and educate new farmers in aspects of field and animal husbandry, with many graduates moving on to pursue a degrees from the likes of Macdonald College at McGill University or the Ontario Agricultural College in Guelph, Ontario.

Additional federal funds for agricultural education in 1913 resulted in the creation and expansion of campus facilities at Nova Scotia Agricultural College to encourage new programs in Home Economics, Women's Institutes, rural science and youth training. Nova Scotia developed demonstration buildings to establish closer ties between the community and agricultural education, especially with the growing demand from governments for more food production during World War I. In 2012, the Nova Scotia Agricultural College merged with Dalhousie University to form its Faculty of Agriculture. The campus is now referred to as the University's Agricultural Campus.

=== Atlantic School of Theology (1971) ===
Atlantic School of Theology was founded in 1971 through the co-operation of the Divinity Faculty of the University of King's College (Anglican Church of Canada), Holy Heart Theological Seminary (The Roman Catholic Episcopal Corporation of Halifax) and Pine Hill Divinity Hall (United Church of Canada). It was granted degree-granting powers in 1974 when it was incorporated by an Act of the Legislature.

=== Cape Breton University (1974) ===
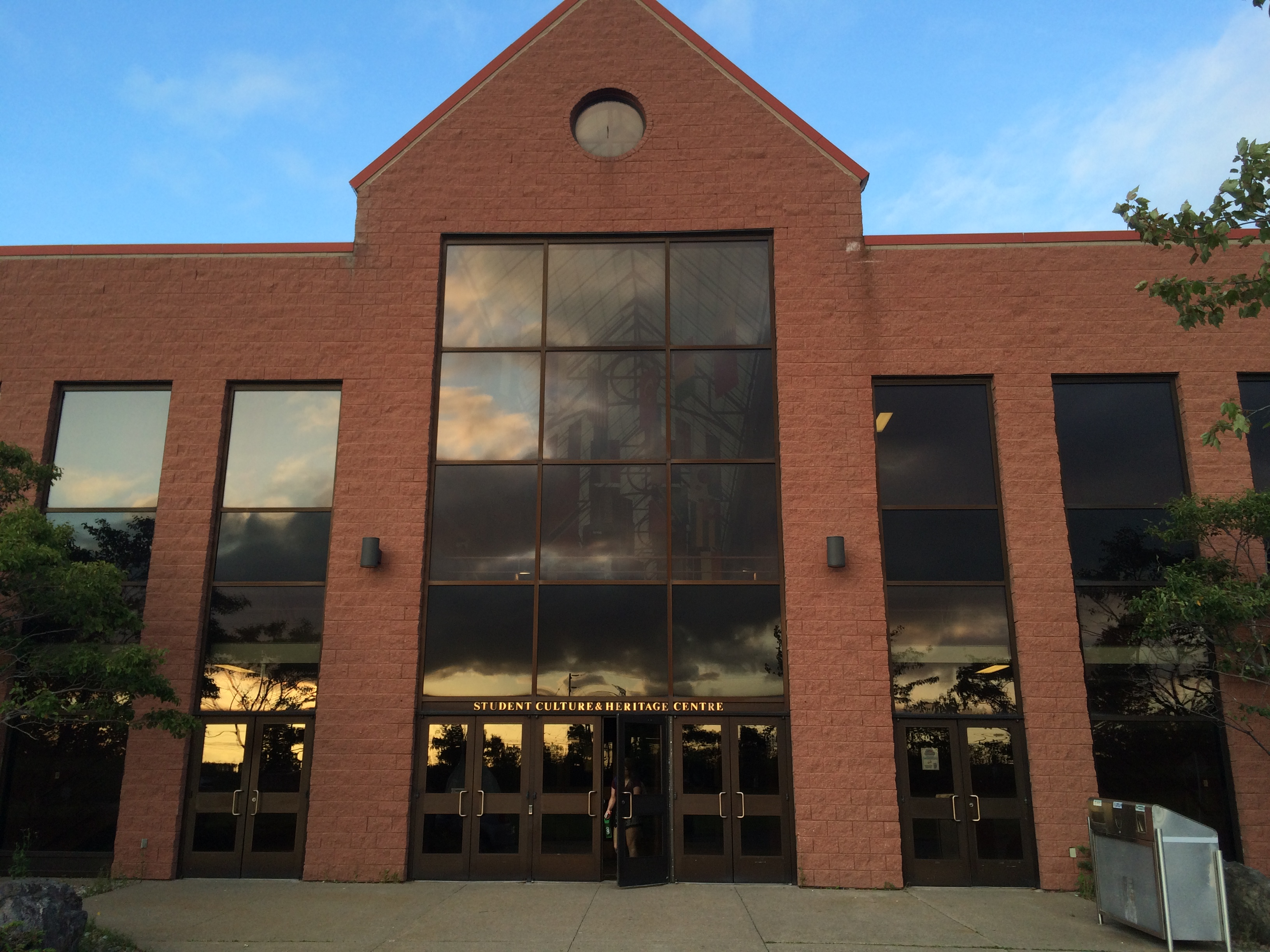
Cape Breton University's Culture and Heritage Centre.

Cape Breton University was founded as the first university college in 1974 on Cape Breton Island when the Nova Scotia Eastern Institute of Technology and Xavier Junior College merged. The new institution, then named University College of Cape Breton, became a public degree-granting institution, while retaining many of the technical and vocational programs from the former institute of technology.

Subsequently, the technical programmes were transferred to the Nova Scotia Community College, particularly to the nearby Marconi Campus. The University has the lowest tuition and fees of any university in Atlantic Canada and the highest percentage of Aboriginal student enrolment of any institution in Atlantic Canada.

== The Nova Scotia Community College (1988) ==
The Nova Scotia Community College (NSCC) was formed in 1988 to focus on training and education, amalgamating the province's former vocational schools and removing duplicate programs. In 1996 the College was separated from the Department of Education and Culture when the Southwestern Nova Scotia Community Colleges Act was enacted and was governed by its own board. The NSCC has five academic schools: the School of Access; the School of IT and Creative Industries; the School of Business; the School of Health and Human Services and the School of Trades and Technology.

Two lucrative and important partnerships were created in recent years, which both established new academic programs at the College and created new job opportunities in the region:

- In October 2012, an MOU was signed to create the Irving Shipbuilding Centre of Excellence at NSCC. Irving Shipbuilding will contribute $250,000 each year during the lifetime of the National Shipbuilding Procurement Strategy program (20 years) to create and support the centre. The MOU is a step towards ensuring that as jobs are created, opportunities are available for more First Nations, African Nova Scotians, persons with disabilities, women in non-traditional trades, and other Nova Scotians who are under-represented in the workforce.
- In November 2012, the Province and IBM, in close partnership with Nova Scotia Business Inc. and a consortium of six higher education institutions, led by NSCC, announced new agreements to establish an IBM Global Delivery Center, create up to 500 new highly skilled jobs and nurture the development of analytics skills within Nova Scotia.

Community college programmes offered in French are under the responsibility of Université Sainte-Anne.

== History of funding ==
=== 1880s ===
In 1881, Nova Scotia "abandoned the public support of universities and colleges". In 1882, the Bank of Nova Scotia (Scotiabank) opened a branch in Winnipeg, Manitoba and then expanded its operations in the American Midwest Scotiabank. The loans available for the region reduced and the region lagged behind in industrialization. The provincial government focused its efforts on agriculture and post-secondary education continued to be deprived of provincial funding.

=== 1900–1950s ===
In 1911, Canadian universities came together to plan for the Congress of Empire Universities to be held in 1912. In 1917, this group of Canadian universities was formally known as the National Conference of Canadian Universities (NCCU). The NCCU 'successfully lobbied the Federal Government to financially support higher education' and with the mass entry of post-World War II veterans, federal funding for higher education was secured in the late 1950s. The Federal Government decided on a policy to pay the provinces per student in higher education in each province. Nova Scotia had a smaller population than other provinces but had a large number of out-of-province and international students who did not remain in the province after graduation. The large number of universities meant that funding was very thinly distributed across the universities.

=== 1960s ===
In the 1960s, the Federal Government put the responsibility of post secondary education back to the provinces. It agreed to grant up to half of the operating expenses of post secondary institutions in each province and provided special funding for research and special projects. Provincial governments had to provide the rest of the funding.

=== 1970–1980s ===
In the 1970s, the Maritime Provinces Higher Education Commission (MPHEC) was established to act as one University Grants Commission for the Atlantic provincesAtlantic Canada. It allocated funds received from the Federal Government to each Atlantic province. Nova Scotia universities continued to lobby for an increase in capital funds and following the report of the Royal Commission on Post-Secondary Education in 1986, the Nova Scotia Council on Higher Education (NSCHE) was established, representing the interests of Nova Scotia on the MPHEC. In 1989, it became a legal entity under the Ministry of Advanced Education and Job Training.

=== 1990s ===
In 1995, the Nova Scotia Council on Higher Education (NSCHE) began a process to review and recommend a new Funding Formula for Nova Scotia's universities. This process attempted to acknowledge considerable changes in enrolment and new programs at several universities, and the new formula was approved by government for fiscal 1998–99. The new Funding Formula has two major components: Unrestricted operating grants (96%) and Restricted operating grants (4%). The Unrestricted operating grants are broken down into three components: the Weighted Enrolment Grant (WEG); the Research Grant and the Extra Formula Grants. The WEG accounts for approximately 91% of the total operating funding provided to universities. Extra Formula Grants take into consideration unique characteristics such as size; French-language instruction; part-time students; isolation (distance from Halifax). The Memorandum of Understanding between the government and the universities were negotiated for 2004–08 and from 2008–2011 based on this funding model.

=== 2000–2010 ===
Enrolment of undergraduate students in Nova Scotia universities is noteworthy as it impacts the funding formula. Nova Scotia has a disproportionate number of out of province students, more than any other province in the country. The calculation that is based on a per-capita basis does not include out-of-province students, thereby bringing no provincial support from their home province. In 2003, university funding provided by the provincial government was $205 million, which was lower than the transfer of $211 million provided in 1992. Government grants covered only 41.9% of operating costs in 2001–02, the lowest proportion of any Canadian province.

=== 2010–2015 ===
In 2012–2013, 34.4% of university funding came by way of provincial grants. Provincial funding totalled $317 million of university operating budgets in 2014–2015. Bill 100, the "Universities Accountability and Sustainability Act," is a contentious Bill that was passed in the Nova Scotia Legislative Assembly on May 11, 2015. This Bill requires institutions in financial difficulty to submit a ‘revitalization plan’ to the government, and during this period collective bargaining agreements and strike action would be suspended. Institutions would be required to align their research and funding decisions with the government's economic priorities. "Delegates attending the annual meeting of the Canadian Association of University Teachers (CAUT)… have voted unanimously to condemn the Nova Scotia government’s Bill 100 as an unacceptable violation of constitutional rights, university autonomy, and academic freedom." The Canadian Association of University Teachers (CAUT) sent letters to Nova Scotia institutions warning that schools will be sanctioned if they try to enact the powers of the new Act; an unprecedented move.

=== Tuition ===
Tuition at Nova Scotian post secondary institutions is set by the individual institutions, in consultation with government. Since 2006, the provincial government has taken measures to bring tuition rates down to the average tuition fees levels in the country. In the six years of the last two MOUs, Nova Scotia went from having the highest average student tuition to being $8 below the national average for Nova Scotian students in Nova Scotian universities:

2006–2007: Federal Infrastructure Trust Fund money was directed to a one-time reduction in tuition for Nova Scotia students studying in Nova Scotia.

2007–2008: One-time $500 tuition reduction for Nova Scotia students; an amendment in the MOU froze tuition in the third year.

2008–2009: Second MOU continued the tuition freeze and introduced a $761 bursary for Nova Scotia students in Nova Scotia (Nova Scotia University Student Bursary Trust).

2009–2010: Tuition frozen and the bursary for Nova Scotia students at Nova Scotia universities rose to $1,022.

2010–2011: Tuition frozen and the bursary for Nova Scotia students at Nova Scotia universities rose to $1,283. For the first time, out of province Canadian students at Nova Scotia universities received a $261 bursary.

=== 2011–2015 ===
Despite strong public resistance and student rallies, the tuition freeze was lifted, resulting in tuition increases at institutions throughout the province. There was, however, a 3% cap implemented. The 2015-2016 NS Provincial budget, however, lifts the cap, allowing institutions to make a one-time market adjustments to tuition and fees. The cap is set to be reinstated the following year, but will no longer apply to out of province or graduate tuition fees, which will no longer be regulated. The bursaries have remained at $1,283 for Nova Scotia students and $261 for out of province students. The new 2015-2016 budget does not, however, make a commitment to continue offering the bursary for out of province students. Once some of the lowest in the country, tuition fees in Nova Scotia are now the third highest in the country — average undergraduate tuition is $6,440 per year, according to Statistics Canada.

=== Student assistance and debt ===
Between 1990 and 2008, the average student debt in Nova Scotia, at the time of repayment, increased from $7,660 to $24,387 (+218%). In constant dollars there was an increase of 119 per cent (from $7,660 to $16,749). A spike in debt after 1992 followed the elimination of the Nova Scotia Bursary Program, which provided the full Nova Scotia student loan portion as a non-repayable bursary. From 1992 on, all student assistance was repayable loans. Eliminating the bursary program and rising tuition left students in Nova Scotia with the highest debt levels in the country.

In 2008, there was a slight decrease in debt as a result of Nova Scotia's tuition reduction measures. Nova Scotia began lending directly to students, reducing the interest rate by two percentage points. A 20 per cent non-repayable grant was introduced, along with a grant for students with dependents. A repayment assistance program and a payment deferral program were introduced.

As a result of a $12.5M investment in 2011 and a further $5.5M investment in 2012 to the Nova Scotia Student Assistance Program, students have increased and improved assistance available to them to support their post-secondary education. This assistance is in the form of increased non-repayable upfront grants and loans, increased allowance, increased in-study earnings exemption and improved electronic service. As well, the first Debt Cap program was initiated in 2011–12. Qualifying students for the program will have their debt capped at $28,560 per student. This program benefits students completing an undergraduate, non-professional degree program. It is claimed that the recent increases in tuition have all but negated the success of the grant program.

== Funding, tuition and student debt in 2011 ==
Following an extensive review of the university system in Nova Scotia, at the end of a third MoU with the universities in Nova Scotia, the provincial government announced in 2011 that it will lift the freeze on tuition fee increases but will cap the increase to 3%. Grants to universities will decrease four percent in 2011-12 and decreases for future years will be negotiated separately.

Nova Scotia's current student assistance program still leaves students with significant unmet need and the second-highest level of repayable loans in the country. The Nova Scotia Higher Education Branch reports that approximately 20, 000 students apply for assistance each year.

== Research funding ==
The Atlantic Innovation Fund was launched in 2001 to provide an additional $300 million for investment in the region's infrastructure. It was expected that a large proportion of the funds aimed at research and development would go towards the province's universities. The higher education sector in Nova Scotia represents 60% of the R&D conducted in the province, a contribution which is twice the national average.

== Access ==
Participation in post-secondary education in the Maritimes in general is higher than the national average, with participation rates in Nova Scotia in particular of 35-40% compared to 20-26% for Canada as a whole. Demand for skilled labour has prompted an increase in participation rates from the nation's post-secondary institutions. However, the number of 18- to 24-year-olds in Nova Scotia and the rest of the Maritime provinces are predicted to decline greater than the rest of Canada. Between 1990 and 2000, the number of 18- to 24-year-olds dropped 13% in the Maritimes while in the rest of Canada, it dropped less than 1%.

=== National enrolment ===
From 2000 to 2006, over 32,000 full-time and part-time students were enrolled in Nova Scotia's 11 universities. In 2006–07, 61% of Nova Scotians aged 25–54 had a post-secondary certificate, diploma or degree. This is on par with the national average for Canadians with post-secondary credentials. Over a five-year period, the number of credentials issued by Nova Scotia's institutions increased by 9.4%. In 2013-2014 students from other provinces in Canada accounted for 25% of the student population in Nova Scotia Universities – a 12.4% increase over the last five years, and a 20.2% increase over the last ten years. Nova Scotians make up two thirds of those enrolled in the province's institutions and of the Maritime provinces, participation in university education is greatest among Nova Scotia residents. The majority of out of province students come from Ontario. In fact, the peak of undergraduate enrolment in the Maritimes was in 2003, attributable to changes in Ontario, where the graduating class doubled in the province upon the elimination of its grade 13 year of high school.

=== First Nations ===
Nova Scotia's universities, through the Atlantic Association of Universities, have developed working relationships with leaders of the Atlantic Policy Congress of First Nation Chiefs to better understand critical issues concerning access for and increased graduation of Aboriginal learners. For example, Sydney's Membertou First Nation and the Nova Scotia Community College signed a memorandum of understanding in 2004 that focuses on three key components: customized training programs relevant to Membertou's employment opportunities, high school transition support programs and information technology initiatives. Since 1996, the Council on Mi'kmaq Education (CME) has worked to provide guidance and advice to Nova Scotia's Minister of Education on programs development and funding for the Mi'kmaq people of the province. Similarly, the Mi'kmaw Kina'matnewey serves various Mi'kmaw communities in the province. The Mi'kmaq Liaison Office (MLO) works as a liaison between the Department of Education and the aboriginal community of Nova Scotia.

=== Women ===
In largely urban areas such as Halifax, participation of female students has increased steadily over the last twenty years. Conversely, the proportion of full-time male students have declined by 9% in the Maritimes. Women who complete a university degree earn 50% more than female high school graduates. Those between the age of 20–34 years old in metro or rural areas are only marginally different in their completion rates for high school. However, when compared to women who have completed post-secondary studies, the gap widens, particularly in University certificate, diploma or degree programs. Women in metro areas average 34.8% completion to 15.9% in rural areas.

=== Rural and urban participation ===
Urban and rural students have relatively equal access to universities in the province due to the good number and well distributed campuses throughout the province. There are financial implications for rural students resulting in graduates borrowing nearly $5,000 or 24% more than those from urban areas. Nearly 24% of urban residents held a university degree, compared to 9-12% of rural residents in Canada overall.

=== Students with disabilities ===
The number of students with a disability that have graduated from post secondary institutions in the province has grown 45%, from 2003 to 2006. This is due to the increasing number of students accessing an increasing number of services and resources offered by government and the institutions they attend. The Post-Secondary Disability Services is a web-based resource that outlines grants, services and contacts for post-secondary students with disabilities. Government grants are available including the Canada Study Grant for Accommodation for Students with Permanent Disabilities and the Canada Access Grant and for Students with Permanent Disabilities.

=== International students ===
Nova Scotia and its 10 universities attract students from around the world. In 2004–2005, there were 3,594 full-time international students attending Nova Scotia universities and community colleges. This accounts for 11% of total students enrolled in Nova Scotia undergraduate programs, above the 7% national average. Universities set their own tuition fees for international students and there are ceilings for the number of students receiving grants in Nova Scotia with only 10% of undergraduate and 30% of graduate students receiving them. According to the Maritime Provinces Higher Education Commission, between 2003-2004 and 2013–2104, the number of international students increased by 90.5%.

=== African Canadians ===
In an effort to eliminate racism and ensure African Canadians receive equity in education, the Black Learners Advisory Committee (BLAC) Report of 1994 made 46 recommendations for change in the province. One of them was the formation of a provincial advisory council, so the Council of African Canadian Education (CACE) was established in 1996. The Council's responsibility is to review and provide recommendations on education policy to better respect and address the needs of Black learners and educators.

=== Financial accessibility ===
University tuition fees in Nova Scotia are among the highest in the country. This is in large part due to low government grants to fund university operating costs. This underfunding, the lowest in the country, has caused tuition in the province to double over the past decade. As a result, fees in Nova Scotia far surpass the median income or saving potential of its population. Other shortages make the province inaccessible to students, such as the elimination of the loan remission program in 2000. It is the only province without a non-repayable student financial assistance program.

=== Transferability ===
The Atlantic Provinces Community College Consortium (APCCC) is an inter-provincial organization which gathers and disseminates resources to improve college-level postsecondary education in the Atlantic provinces. An important aspect of the APCCC is to provide maximum mobility for students learning throughout the postsecondary education system in Atlantic Canada. It is composed of four college systems; Nova Scotia Community College, the College of the North Atlantic in Newfoundland and Labrador, Holland College in Prince Edward Island, and New Brunswick Community College. The APCCC produced a "Guide to Block Transfer Agreements" in 2006. These 'blocks' usually refer to a semester, year, diploma or certificate transferred from a college to a university. The Guide includes approximately 250 potential credit transfer arrangements. Students can choose from several course delivery mechanisms, including distance e-learning.

== Associations ==
=== Association of Atlantic Universities (AAU) ===
Established in 1964, the Association of Atlantic Universities is a voluntary association of the 17 universities in the Atlantic region and in the West Indies which offer programmes leading to a degree or have degree-granting status. One of the fundamental roles of the association is to create greater awareness and understanding of the important contribution of universities to the social and economic development of the Atlantic Provinces. The Association's business is conducted by the AAU Council, which consists of the executive heads of all the member institutions. The AAU currently meets two times a year and is served by a permanent secretariat. The activities of the Association are funded principally through annual membership fees based on the operating income of the member institutions.

The Council of Nova Scotia University Presidents (CONSUP), founded in 1982, is an informal body consisting of the presidents of the 11 degree-granting institutions in the province. CONSUP members meet on a regular basis to deal with matters of common concern, and also meet on occasion with the appropriate minister and/or the premier. The secretariat of the Association of Atlantic Universities (AAU) serves as the secretariat for CONSUP. The members of CONSUP are also members of the Association of Atlantic Universities (AAU).

=== Council of Atlantic Ministers of Education and Training (CAMET) ===
The Atlantic ministers responsible for education and training signed an agreement in April 2004 under which the provinces of New Brunswick, Newfoundland and Labrador, Nova Scotia, and Prince Edward Island agreed to collaborate on joint undertakings to respond to the needs identified in public and post-secondary education. CAMET is dedicated to further enhancing the level of cooperation in public and post-secondary education by working on common issues to improve learning for all Atlantic Canadians, optimize efficiencies and bring added value to provincial initiatives and priorities.

=== Maritime Provinces Higher Education Commission (MPHEC) ===
The MPHEC was created in 1974 to assist Prince Edward Island, New Brunswick and Nova Scotia and their institutions in attaining a more efficient and effective utilization and allocation of higher education resources. It provides quality assurance, data and information sharing, cooperative action, and regional programmes as well as specific services to one or more provinces or institutions as agreed to by the Ministers of Education.

== See also ==
- List of universities in Canada
- List of colleges in Canada
- List of business schools in Canada
- List of law schools in Canada
- List of Canadian universities by endowment
- Higher education in Canada
