= French for the Future =

Canadian not-for-profit organization

French for the Future/ Le français pour l'avenir
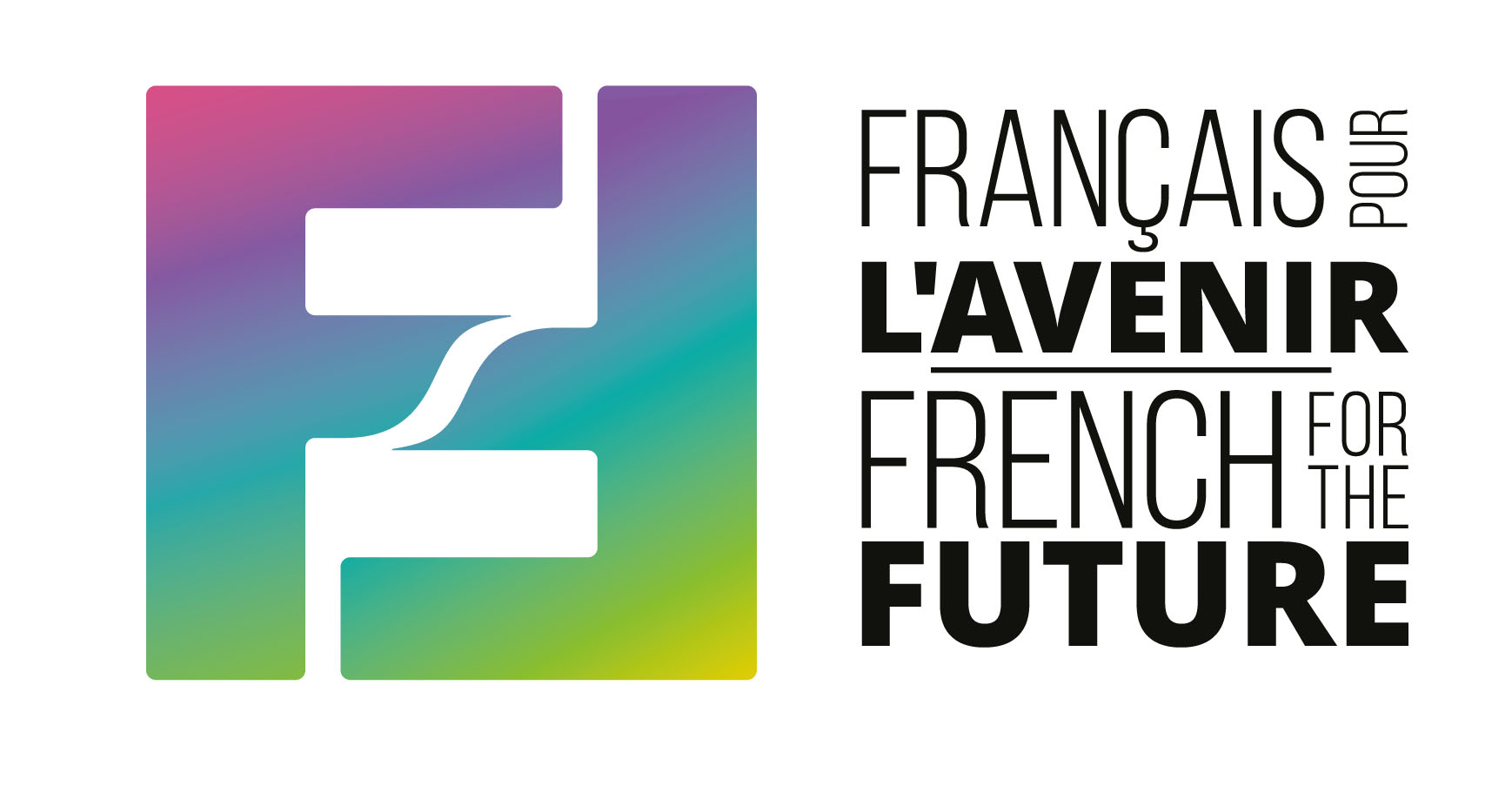
- Abbreviation: FFF/FPA
- Formation: 1997
- Legal status: Non-profit organization
- Location: 170 Laurier Ave W., Suite 904 Ottawa, Ontario, K1P5V5 Canada
- President: Ania Kolodziej
- Affiliations: Canadian Heritage
- Website: https://www.french-future.org/

French for the Future promotes Canada's official bilingualism and the immediate and lifelong benefits of learning and communicating in French to students from grades 7 to 12 across Canada. French for the Future envisions a Canada in which all young people value French heritage, appreciate francophone cultures and endeavour to excel in the French language.

== History ==
French for the Future was founded by John Ralston Saul and Lisa Balfour Bowen as a national program for students who are completing their last years of high school in French immersion, or in French-as-a-first-language, mainly outside of Quebec. Originally, French for the Future was a conference – a two-day event that brought together students from the Greater Toronto Area.

In 2000, the conference expanded and took place in Toronto, Halifax, Vancouver, and Calgary. Each event was connected with one another by satellite-powered radio diffusion technology.

In 2001, French for the Future opened its national headquarters in Toronto. The number of cities that organized conferences kept increasing that in 2003, French for the Future introduced 2 new programs: The Horizon Project, which brought students to Montreal to participate in excursions and cultural events; and the Jeunes Franco-Nord project, which united students living in the North to Whitehorse for a French for the Future like conference.

In 2004, the Horizon Project transformed to the National Ambassador Youth Forum (FNJA), which took place in Calgary.

The last edition of the Jeunes Franco-Nord project occurred in 2005. That same year, the National Essay Contest was launched, originally to select FNJA participants.

The French for the Future conferences were renamed Local Forums in 2006, and the amount of participating cities continued to grow.

In September 2011, the Franconnexion Sessions were introduced.

Later in 2018, French for the Future established its own youth committee: Bilingual Young Leaders.

Shortly thereafter in February 2019, faced with growing demands to organize Local Forums in smaller communities, X-Forum was created.

== Programs ==
=== National Ambassador Youth Forum (NAYF) ===
Dating back to 2004, this program brings together 30 students from across Canada for a week of learning and appreciating Canada's diverse and ever-changing Francophone culture. The NAYF program focuses on building skills such as leadership, communication and team spirit, with the ultimate goal of creating ambassadors for Canada's bilingualism. Over a week filled with interactive workshops and activities, the ambassadors will learn about the advantages of official-language bilingualism, its major issues and challenges, and to celebrate the Francophone culture.

Participants are selected for their interest in and commitment to bilingualism.

=== National Essay Contest ===
Since 2005, students from across Canada write an essay in French, that adheres to a different theme every year. Contest winners and finalists are awarded exceptional scholarships in order to pursue post-secondary education completely or partially in French. In partnership with:

- University of Ottawa
- Université Sainte Anne
- Université de Montréal
- Université de Moncton
- Université de Saint-Boniface
- Glendon College – York University
- University of Alberta – Campus Saint-Jean
- University of Lethbridge
- La Cité Universitaire francophone – University of Regina
- Collège Boréal
- The University of British Columbia
- Collège de l’Île

In 2018-2019, the National Essay Contest had 12 partnerships with post-secondary institutions and offered a total of $267,000 in scholarships.

=== Local Forums ===
French for the Future's Local Forums are held in more than 15 cities across Canada, bringing together high school students studying French as a second language (FSL) and French as a First Language (FFL). The forums aim to highlight the cultural and professional benefits of bilingual education and encourage students to continue developing their French language skills.

Participants attend educational workshops, take part in group discussions, and engage in cultural events and activities. They also have opportunities to interact with bilingual professionals and exchange perspectives on French language learning, fostering connections within their regional bilingual communities.

=== x-Forums ===
x-Forums are local events that bring together students from Grade 7 to 12 enrolled in French as a second language, and French as a first language programs. Their main objective is the promotion of bilingualism and/or linguistic duality.

They are independently organized by volunteers, and come from local initiatives in the communities. The x-Forums are unique in their programs and formats, but share the following intentions:

- Deliver an inspiring and motivational message about Canadian bilingualism
- Give youth an opportunity to play an active role
- Create a positive environment in which every student feels at ease speaking French

=== Franconnexion Sessions ===
Franconnexion Sessions help students connect the French learnt in the classroom with the real-life benefits of being bilingual. A Franconnexion Session is an event that is organized for students enrolled in any French program (Core, Extended, Immersion, French as a First Language). This one-hour, half-day, or full-day event takes places within a school or school board, and gives students the opportunity to participate in workshops and cultural activities oriented towards the benefits of speaking French, in a fun atmosphere.

=== Bilingual Young Leaders ===
The Bilingual Young Leaders are a Youth committee founded by French for the Future. It is made up of 7 young committed bilingual Canadians between 16 and 22, who want to develop projects to promote bilingualism.

The Committee serves as a springboard for implementing local initiatives that will help promote Canada's official bilingualism via French learning, led by and for youth. The committee represents an expansion of French for the Future's actions, raising awareness among more young people, while allowing a group of qualified young persons to receive training in governance and project management.

The Youth Committee also acts as an advisory committee for French for the Future, while aiming to maintain a continual dialogue with young people, in order to keep offering them relevant programs.
