= Nova Scotia Community College =

Community college in Canada

- Type: Public Community College
- Established: 1996
- Academic affiliations: Colleges and Institutes Canada, Centre for Ocean Ventures & Entrepreneurship (COVE), ONE Nova Scotia Coalition, Research Nova Scotia, CBIE, CCAA, ACCC, AUCC
- President: Anna Burke (Acting)
- Total staff: 2,000 (2021)
- Students: 10,843 fulltime, 20,000 total
- Location: 13 campuses and three community learning centres throughout Nova Scotia, Canada; 44.6692°N 63.6134°W
- Campus: Halifax, Dartmouth, Amherst, Springhill, Kentville, Bridgewater, Sydney, Stellarton, Shelburne, Port Hawkesbury, Truro, Middleton, Lawrencetown, Yarmouth, Digby, Wagmatcook
- Colours: Blue
- Website: www.nscc.ca

Nova Scotia Community College or NSCC is a Canadian community college serving the province of Nova Scotia through a network of 14 campuses and three community learning centres.

The college delivers over 130 programs in five academic schools: Access, Education and Language; Business and Creative Industries; Health & Human Services; Technology and Environment; and Trades and Transportation. Introducing roughly 20,000 students a year (fulltime and part-time combined), NSCC provides the majority of technical and apprenticeship training in Nova Scotia.

NSCC includes four specialized institutes: the Nautical Institute, the School of Fisheries, the Aviation Institute and the Centre of Geographical Sciences.

The Acting President of NSCC is Anna Burke. They employ about 2,000 people.

== History ==
In 1872, the Halifax Marine School was established. While it would later become the NSCC Nautical Institute, it then represented the first vocational and technical education institution in the Province of Nova Scotia. It was the first in a number of specialized training institutions around the province that offered education in areas such as agriculture, surveying, engineering and navigation.

In 1987, the Department of Vocational & Technical Training published a White Paper recommending the creation of a community college system for Nova Scotia. The establishment of the system, it was argued, would bring technology, vocational and upgrading institutions together under one umbrella and allow for the development and coordination of college programs and services at a province-wide level. That would work to meet both pan-provincial and local economic and applied education needs.

In 1988, Nova Scotia became the last province in Canada to create a community college system, which brought 16 institutions together into one college system. In name, it became the predecessor to NSCC; however, it would be several years until NSCC was established in its current form.

In 1992, two more campuses joined the college system from their respective school boards, followed by in 1995 the Nova Scotia Teacher's College closed and became an NSCC site.

NSCC became autonomous from the province in 1996 by incorporating itself as an independent institution with a Board of Governors (An Act Respecting Collège de l’Acadie and Nova Scotia Community College).

Since then, the NSCC network of campuses has evolved into a province-wide, community-based, community college, with polytechnical, applied arts and health science educational programs.

== Campuses and locations ==
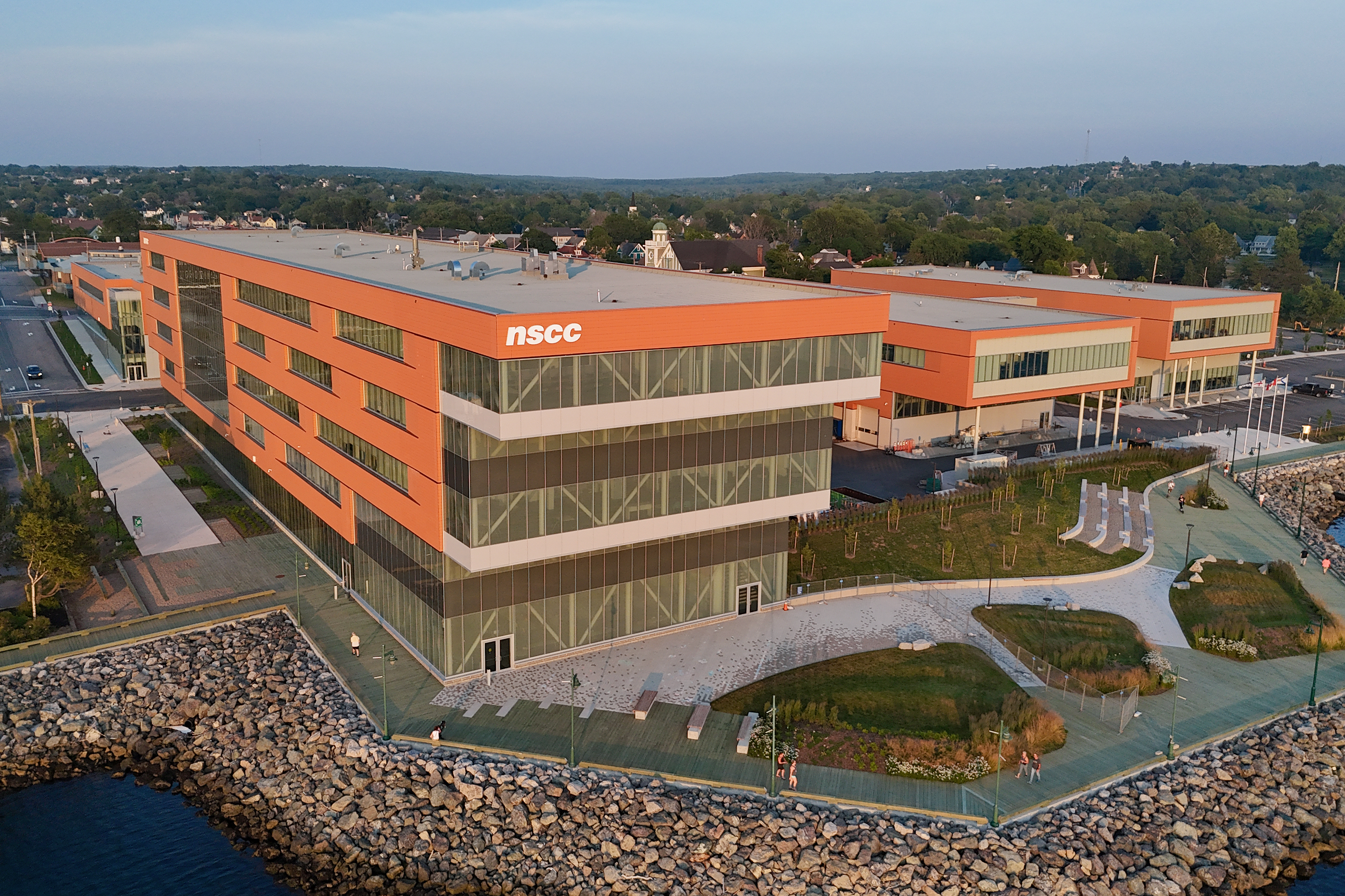
The Sydney Waterfront Campus opened in 2024

The Nova Scotia Community College occupies 14 campuses, located in:

- Bridgewater (Lunenburg Campus)
- Dartmouth (Akerley Campus) (Ivany Campus)
- Halifax (Institute of Technology)
- Kentville (Kingstec Campus)
- Middleton (Annapolis Valley Campus)
- Port Hawkesbury (Strait Area Campus)
- Shelburne (Shelburne Campus)
- Springhill (Cumberland Campus)
- Stellarton (Pictou Campus)
- Sydney (Waterfront Campus)
- Truro (Truro Campus)
- Yarmouth (Burridge Campus)

The Aviation Institute is part of Ivany Campus and is housed in a building near the Ivany Campus. The Nautical Institute is located in the Strait Area Campus. The School of Fisheries is located in the Shelburne Campus.

The Centre of Geographic Studies, often referred to by the acronym COGS, is part of Annapolis Valley Campus and is located in a separate site in Lawrencetown.

There are also two Community Learning Centres located in Amherst (part of the Cumberland Campus) and Digby (part of the Burridge Campus).

The Strait Area Campus also offers programs in Wagmatcook First Nation at the Wagmatcook Learning Centre.

On November 27, 2017, the province of Nova Scotia and NSCC announced plans to relocate Marconi Campus to downtown Sydney. The specific location, on Sydney's waterfront, was announced by the province of Nova Scotia and NSCC on August 2, 2019.

== Specialized institutes ==
=== Nautical Institute ===
NSCC Nautical Institute Wave Pool

NSCC's Nautical Institute offers Transport Canada-approved marine training for students who want to start or advance their career at sea. Students learn in specially designed marine facilities, including a wave tank, free-fall lifeboat and fire training centre, and with state-of-the-art simulation equipment for navigation and engine room training. The Nautical Institute is part of the college's Strait Area Campus. The predecessor of the Nautical Institute is the Halifax Marine School.

=== School of Fisheries ===
The School of Fisheries offers a wide range of training programs to meet the needs of the fish harvesting industry and for small vessel operators. Courses are offered at the facility in Shelburne, at locations throughout Nova Scotia and around the world.

=== Aviation Institute ===
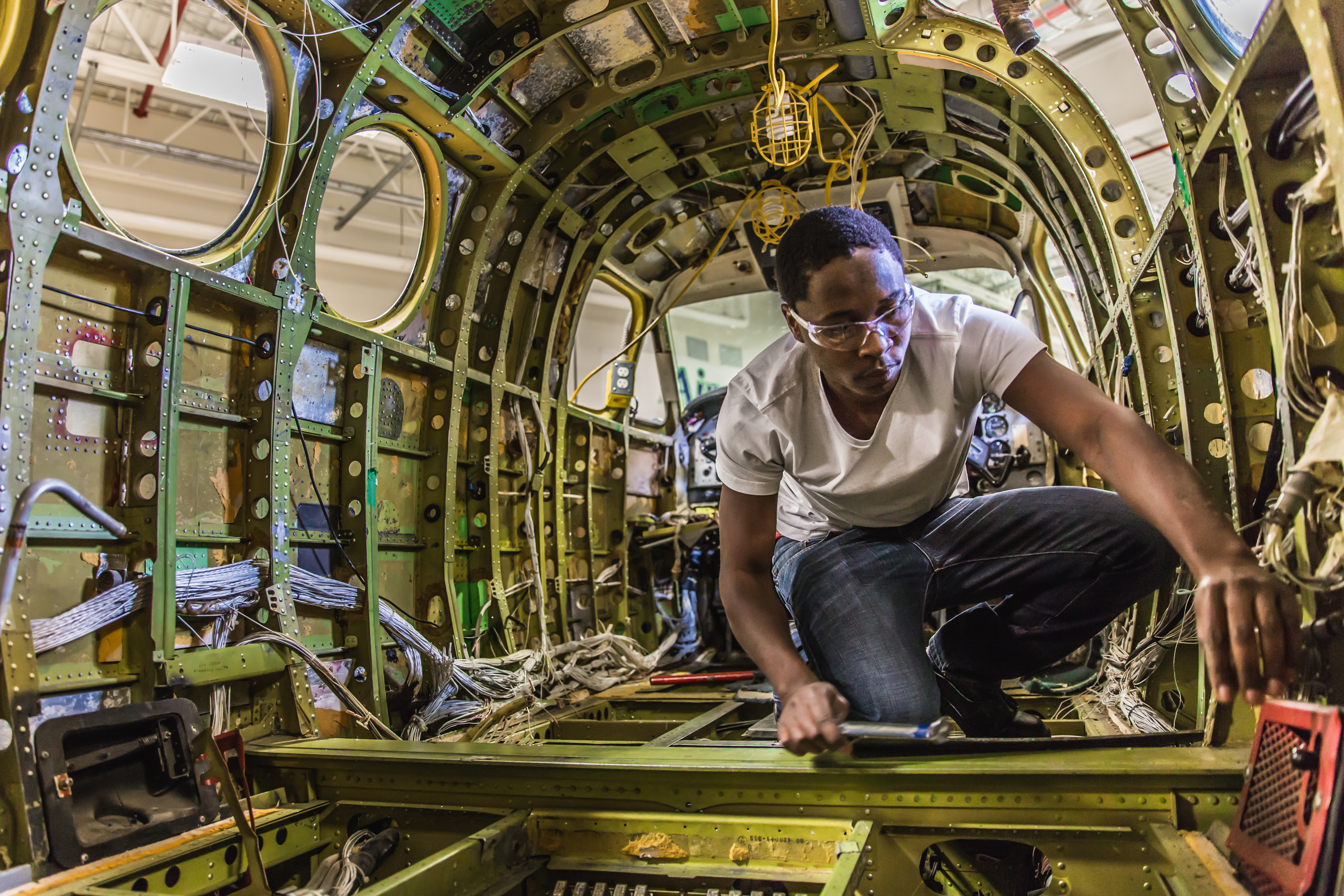
NSCC Aviation Institute

The Aviation Institute is located on Pleasant Street at the Dartmouth Gate building (former Moirs Plant).

=== Centre of Geographic Sciences ===
The Centre of Geographic Sciences (also known as COGS) in Lawrencetown is Canada's largest geomatics-focused learning environment. COGS is often featured on the television program The Curse of Oak Island. NSCC staff, faculty and graduates frequently work on screen and behind the scenes of the program.

== CCKC - 88.9 The Platypus ==
The Ivany Campus in Dartmouth manages "The Platypus", an online-only radio station. The station is managed by students of the Radio, Television & Journalism program.
