= Maritime Christian College =

Coordinates: 46°15′18″N 63°08′30″W

- Motto: His Word is Truth
- Type: Private college
- Established: January 19, 1960
- President: Richard Jones
- Students: 25
- Location: Charlottetown, Prince Edward Island, Canada
- Website: www.mccpei.com

Maritime Christian College is a degree-granting institution located in Charlottetown, Prince Edward Island. The college is part of the Church of Christ / Christian Church Restoration Movement. The purpose of Maritime Christian College is to biblically educate and equip people to become disciples of Jesus who make disciples.

== History ==
Maritime Christian College was established January 19, 1960 when the government of Prince Edward Island granted Letters Patent to the incorporators. This action was initiated by a group of individuals who were intensely interested in the Lord's work in the Canadian Maritimes.

Maritime Christian College offices are located in Charlottetown, the capital of Prince Edward Island. For the first three decades, the College shared facilities with Central Christian Church on Kent Street. In the summer of 1993, the College purchased its own campus at 503 University Avenue, across from the University of Prince Edward Island. In 2023 the College sold its property at 503 University Avenue and now rents office space from Sherwood Christian Church on Lilac Avenue.

From its conception, Maritime Christian College has been affiliated with and supported by the Christian churches and churches of Christ. These churches are a part of the Restoration Movement, which was begun in the 19th century by such men as Alexander Campbell and Barton W. Stone. This movement is based on a plea for unity among God's people by restoring the essential elements of biblical Christianity. Through the years Maritime Christian College has provided biblically-oriented education for Christian leaders who are preparing for a variety of ministry opportunities in the Maritimes and around the world.

== See also ==
- Higher education in Prince Edward Island
