= Miꞌkmaw Kinaꞌmatnewey =

Educational organization of the Mi'kmaw First Nation

Mi'kmaw Kina'matnewey is an organization that advocates for the educational interests of twelve Mi'kmaw communities in Nova Scotia. It is a corporation without share capital established for the purpose of supporting the delivery of educational programs and services by the Mi’kmaq Education Act of 1998 of the Government of Canada.

By 2002 a curriculum had been developed to teach the Miꞌkmaq language. In 2013, 88% of students who started Grade 12 on reserve graduated. Teaching of the Mi'kmaq language has been promoted by the translation by the board of seven titles by Robert Munsch and it was hoped to do the same with other authors.
