= Collège de l'Acadie =

Community college in Nova Scotia, Canada

Collège de l'Acadie was a Francophone post-secondary community college in the Canadian provinces of Nova Scotia and Prince Edward Island with headquarters in the community of Tusket. Its Nova Scotia operations are now part of Université Sainte-Anne while its operations in Prince Edward Island were renamed Collège Acadie Île-du-Prince-Édouard and later Collège de l'Île.

== History ==
Collège de l'Acadie was founded in August 1988 in the Canadian province of Nova Scotia as the Francophone community college for that province. It subsequently expanded to Prince Edward Island in the 1990s under a joint-funding agreement between the two provincial governments. In 2003, the Nova Scotia operations of Collège de l'Acadie were merged with Université Sainte-Anne. The PEI operations became Collège de l'Île.

Its main campus and administration were headquartered in Tusket with satellite campuses in Francophone regions throughout Nova Scotia and Prince Edward Island until its merger with Sainte-Anne.

== Campuses ==
Nova Scotia campuses

- Tusket, Yarmouth County
- Meteghan River, Digby County
- Pomquet, Antigonish County
- Dartmouth, Halifax County
- Petit-de-Grat, Richmond County
- Saint-Joseph-du-Moine, Inverness County

Prince Edward Island campuses

- Wellington, Prince County
- Charlottetown, Queens County
- Deblois, Prince County
- North Rustico, Queens County
- Souris, Kings County

== 2003–2008 restructuring ==
In 2003 the Nova Scotia operations of Collège de l'Acadie were merged into the Université Sainte-Anne which is headquartered at Pointe-de-l'Église, however, the Prince Edward Island operations continued under the name Collège Acadie Île-du-Prince-Édouard. On June 23, 2008 the college was granted official status by the Legislative Assembly of Prince Edward Island.

== Programs ==
The college offered technical and professional programs and all campuses are equipped with distance education systems such as audiographic conference systems and videoconference systems, as well as access to the Internet.
