= Collège de l'Île =

Coordinates: 46°27′13″N 64°0′0″W

- Motto: Ton accès au succès. Pour un horizon à ta façon.
- Type: Public community college
- Established: 1993
- Parent institution: Société éducative de l'Î.-P.-É.
- Chairperson: Sue LeMaistre
- President: Sylvain Gagné
- Students: 100
- Location: Prince Edward Island, Canada
- Language: Canadian French
- Website: www.collegedelile.ca

Collège de l'Île (formerly Collège Acadie Île-du-Prince-Édouard) is a Francophone post-secondary community college in the Canadian province of Prince Edward Island with headquarters in the community of Wellington. It was originally a campus of Collège de l'Acadie which served Nova Scotia and Prince Edward Island. When the Nova Scotia operations became part of Université Sainte-Anne, its operations in Prince Edward Island were renamed Collège Acadie Î.-P.-É and subsequently Collège de l'Île.

== Programmes ==
Currently, Collège de l'Île offers college level programmes in Accounting Clerk, Business administration, Bilingual Administrative Assistant, Early Childhood Assistant/Educator, Human Services, Practical Nursing, Resident Care Worker, and Youth Worker. Students may also take French courses at various levels, both face to face or online. There are part-time programmes and classes for adults preparing for higher education or who need basic literacy skills.

As part of extra funding for English and French minority education initiatives, Collège de l'Île has received federal funding for health care training, in collaboration with the Consortium national de formation en santé (CNFS).

Collège de l'Île has recently signed articulation agreements with the University of Prince Edward Island (UPEI), similar in nature to the agreements between Holland College and UPEI.

== Student body ==
The students are both Canadian and international. The majority of international students are from Spanish-speaking Latin American countries such as Mexico and Peru. Following a difficult recruitment cycle during the COVID pandemic period, the student population is expected to grow significantly with recruitment efforts in French speaking countries of Africa and Europe.
