= Wellington, Prince Edward Island =

Wellington
- Rural municipality
- Wellington in Prince Edward Island
- Coordinates: 46.450°N 64.001°W
- Country: Canada
- Province: Prince Edward Island
- County: Prince County

Population (2011)
  - Total: 409
- Time zone: AST
  - Summer (DST): ADT
- Area code: 902

Wellington is a rural municipality in Prince Edward Island, Canada. It is located in Prince County, and extends as Wellington Centre onto Route 2 from Richmond through to St. Nicholas.

Located in the "Evangeline Region," a cluster of Acadian communities in the central part of Prince County, Wellington is served by Route 2 and until 1989 was served by the Prince Edward Island Railway. Wellington is home to the head office of Collège Acadie Î.-P.-É.

== Demographics ==
Federal census population history of Wellington
Year	Pop.	±%
1961	292	—
1966	330	+13.0%
1971	347	+5.2%
1976	359	+3.5%
1981	376	+4.7%
1986	405	+7.7%
1991	408	+0.7%
1996	427	+4.7%
2001	382	−10.5%
2006	401	+5.0%
2011	409	+2.0%
2016	415	+1.5%
2021	414	−0.2%
Source: Statistics Canada

In the 2021 Census of Population conducted by Statistics Canada, Wellington had a population of 414 living in 197 of its 211 total private dwellings, a change of −0.2% from its 2016 population of 415. With a land area of 1.7 km^{2} (0.66 sq mi), it had a population density of 243.5/km^{2} (630.7/sq mi) in 2021.
