= Université Sainte-Anne =

Public university in Nova Scotia, Canada

- Coat of arms
- Motto: Fidelitas
- Motto in English: Faithfulness
- Type: Public
- Established: 1890; 136 years ago (as Collège Sainte-Anne)(Incorporated in 1892)
- Affiliations: AUCC, IAU, AUFC
- Chancellor: Arthur LeBlanc
- Rector: Kenneth Deveau
- Academic staff: Arts, sciences & professional programs
- Students: 699 (Fall 2026)
- Undergraduates: 664
- Postgraduates: 35
- Location: 1695, Route 1 Pointe-de-l’Église (Nouvelle-Écosse) B0W 1M0, Pointe-de-l'Église, Nova Scotia, Canada
- Campus: Rural area
- Secularization: 1971
- Colours: Blue & Copper
- Mascot: Dragons
- Website: www.usainteanne.ca

Université Sainte-Anne is a French-language university in Pointe-de-l'Église, Nova Scotia, Canada. It and the Université de Moncton in New Brunswick are the only French-language universities in the Maritime Provinces.

== History ==
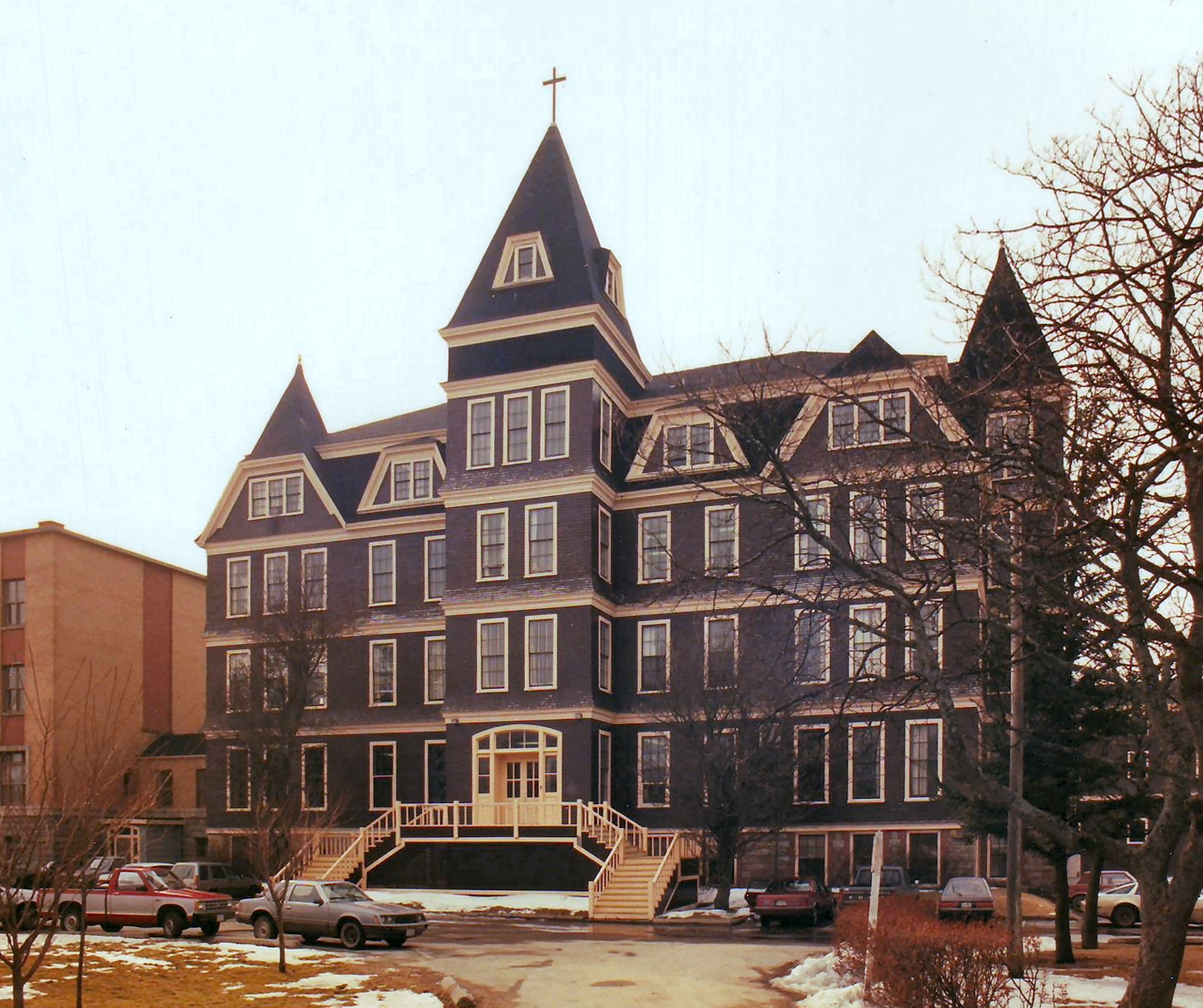
The main administration building at Université Sainte-Anne in Church Point Nova Scotia, was designed by William Critchlow Harris and erected in 1889.

Université Saint-Anne was founded on September 1, 1890 by Gustave Blanche, a Eudist Father, to facilitate the higher education of Acadians in Nova Scotia. The university was named after Saint Anne, the mother of the Virgin Mary.

In 2003, the provincial government merged the university with Collège de l'Acadie, a French-language community college with campuses throughout Nova Scotia.

Its enrolment for the 2005-2006 academic year was around 650-700 students, while in 2018, it had 390 full-time undergraduate students, 120 part-time undergrads, and 30 graduate students.

From 3 March 2022 to 20 April 2022, the 39-member faculty union went on strike. At 49 days, it was one of the longest university strikes in Canadian history.

=== SA Change Now ===
Beginning in September 2023, a student-led anti-rape culture campaign, SA Change Now, posted more than 60 anonymous accounts of sexual harassment, sexual assault, and rape at the university. They included the accounts of victims of a serial perpetrator who, in 2018-19, while working as a student security officer, sexually assaulted students. The campaign called for better lighting on the main Church Point campus, an on-site counsellor, a psychologist, a sexual-assault complaint officer, and an overhaul of the university's sexual-assault hearing process. The university released its sexual violence policy, the revision of which had already been in the works, and hired a part-time counsellor. The campaign also requested that the Rector acknowledge and apologize for the rape culture on campus; no acknowledgement or apology was given. The administration never responded to the campaign or mentioned its name in any official communication, despite the campaign's petition of support for its requests getting more than 800 signatures. In November 2023, the faculty union voted to recognize that there was a rape culture on campus. In 2024, a student sued the institution "for failing to protect her from physical and emotional harm following a series of alleged sexual assaults on campus".

== Academics ==
Université Sainte-Anne offers many university-level programs as well as college-level diploma programs. It has two faculties and one school: the Faculté des Arts et Sciences, Faculté des Programmes Professionnels and the French Immersion School. In the Faculty of Arts and Sciences, one may pursue studies in several fields: French language, literature and linguistics, history, Canadian studies, Acadian studies, commerce, English language and literature, Biology, Chemistry, Physics, General Sciences, Pre-Veterinary Studies, and Health Sciences. In the Faculty of Professional Programmes, students may pursue studies in Administrative sciences or in education. The most popular majors are: French, commerce, business administration and education.

In addition to the Pointe-de-l'Église main campus, students may take courses through the university at other locations: Tusket, Halifax, Petit-de-Grat and Saint-Joseph-du-Moine. Its Halifax campus offers a 1-year Bachelor of Education program and a Master of Education program.

== Notable alumni ==
- Louis LaPierre (B.A. 1964; honorary Ph.D. 2001), former professor of ecology and professor emeritus at the Université de Moncton, who resigned as professor emeritus at the Université de Moncton and also resigned from the Order of Canada after it was discovered that he had falsified his academic credentials.

== See also ==
- Higher education in Nova Scotia
- List of universities in Nova Scotia
- Canadian Interuniversity Sport
- Canadian government scientific research organizations
- Canadian university scientific research organizations
- Canadian industrial research and development organizations
