= Lot 2, Prince Edward Island =

- Township
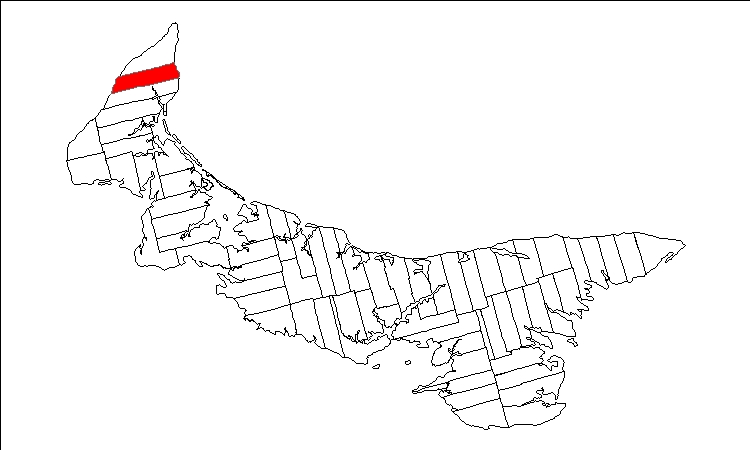
- Map of Prince Edward Island highlighting Lot 2
- Coordinates: 46°54′N 64°6′W
- Country: Canada
- Province: Prince Edward Island
- County: Prince County
- Parish: North Parish

Area
  - Total: 85.84 km^{2} (33.14 sq mi)

Population (2006)
  - Total: 1,655
  - Density: 19.3/km^{2} (50/sq mi)
- Time zone: UTC-4 (AST)
  - Summer (DST): UTC-3 (ADT)
- Canadian Postal code: C0B
- Area code: 902
- NTS Map: 021I16
- GNBC Code: BAEQO

Lot 2 is a township in Prince County, Prince Edward Island, Canada created during the 1764–1766 survey of Samuel Holland. It is part of North Parish.

== Population ==
Historical population
Year	Pop.	±%
1871	1,343	—
1881	1,890	+40.7%
1891	2,282	+20.7%
1901	2,160	−5.3%
1911	1,992	−7.8%
1921	1,630	−18.2%
1931	1,406	−13.7%
1941	1,803	+28.2%
1996	1,766	−2.1%
2001	1,720	−2.6%
2006	1,655	−3.8%

== Communities ==
Incorporated municipalities:

- Greenmount-Montrose
- Miminegash
- St. Felix
- St. Louis
- Tignish Shore

Civic address communities:

- Deblois
- Ebbsfleet
- Greenmount
- Harper
- Kildare Capes
- Leoville
- Palmer Road
- Pleasant View
- St. Edward
- St. Felix
- St. Lawrence
- St. Peter and St. Paul
- St. Roch
- Tignish Shore
- Woodvale

== History ==
The township went through various owners under feudalism when Prince Edward Island was a British colony prior to Canadian Confederation:

- James Hunter and William Hunter, Merchants. (1767–1810)
- John Hill (1838)
- Sir Samuel Cunard. (1864)
