= Tignish-Palmer Road =

Provincial electoral district in Prince Edward Island, Canada

Coordinates: 46°57′0″N 64°3′0″W

Prince Edward Island electoral district

Provincial electoral district
- Legislature: Legislative Assembly of Prince Edward Island
MLA
Hal Perry
Liberal
- District created: 1996 (name change in 2007)
- First contested: 1996
- Last contested: 2023

Tignish-Palmer Road (District 27) is a provincial electoral district for the Legislative Assembly of Prince Edward Island, Canada. It was formerly Tignish-DeBlois from 1996 to 2007.

== Members ==
The riding has elected the following members of the Legislative Assembly:

Members of the Legislative Assembly for Tignish-Palmer Road
Assembly	Years	Member	Party
See 1st Prince 1873–1996
60th	1996–2000	Bobby Morrissey	Liberal
61st	2000–2003	Gail Shea	Progressive Conservative
62nd	2003–2007	Gail Shea	Progressive Conservative
63rd	2007–2011	Neil LeClair	Liberal
64th	2011–2013	Hal Perry	Progressive Conservative
64th	2013–2015	Hal Perry	Liberal
65th	2015–2019	Hal Perry	Liberal
66th	2019–2023	Hal Perry	Liberal
67th	2023–present	Hal Perry	Liberal

== Communities ==
It includes, among others, the following communities:

- Tignish
- Palmer Road
- St. Felix
- St. Louis (northern-half only, until 2007)
- St. Edward (northern-half only, until 2007)
- St. Roch
- St. Peter & St. Paul
- Norway
- Christopher Cross
- Peterville
- Leoville
- Harper
- Ascension
- Miminegash (northern-half only, until 2007)
- Nail Pond
- Skinners Pond
- Waterford
- Pleasant View
- Greenmount
- Kildare
- Deblois
- Anglo–Tignish
- Tignish Shore
- Jude's Point
- Seacow Pond

== Election results ==
=== Tignish-Palmer Road, 2007–present ===
2023 Prince Edward Island general election
Party	Candidate	Votes	%	±%
Liberal	Hal Perry	1,527	58.7	+9.4
Progressive Conservative	April Delaney	939	36.1	+7.6
New Democratic	Gail Kinch	137	5.3	+3.7
Total valid votes		2,603	100.0	
Liberal hold		Swing		+0.9

2019 Prince Edward Island general election
Party	Candidate	Votes	%	±%
Liberal	Hal Perry	1,388	49.3%	-8.93
Progressive Conservative	Melissa Handrahan	802	28.5%	-3.55
Green	Sean Doyle	584	20.7%	+14.16
New Democratic	Dale Ryan	44	1.6%	-1.57
Total valid votes		2,818	100.0	
Liberal hold		Swing		

2015 Prince Edward Island general election
Party	Candidate	Votes	%	±%
Liberal	Hal Perry	1,486	58.23	+9.49
Progressive Conservative	Joseph Profit	818	32.05	-18.01
Green	Malcolm Pitre	167	6.54	
New Democratic	John A'Hearn	81	3.17	
Total valid votes		2,552	100.0	
Liberal hold		Swing		+13.75
Liberal candidate Hal Perry gained 8.08 percentage points from his 2011 performance running as a Progressive Conservative.

2011 Prince Edward Island general election
Party	Candidate	Votes	%	±%
Progressive Conservative	Hal Perry	1,175	50.15	+5.30
Liberal	Neil LeClair	1,142	48.74	−6.41
Island	Derek D. Peters	26	1.11	
Total valid votes		2,343	100.0	
Progressive Conservative gain from Liberal		Swing		+5.86

2007 Prince Edward Island general election
Party	Candidate	Votes	%	±%
Liberal	Neil LeClair	1,569	55.15	+11.18
Progressive Conservative	Gail Shea	1,276	44.85	−10.44
Total valid votes		2,845	100.0	
Liberal gain from Progressive Conservative		Swing		+10.81

=== 2016 electoral reform plebiscite results ===
2016 Prince Edward Island electoral reform referendum
Side	Votes	%
First Past the Post	401	55.16
Dual Member Proportional Representation	128	17.61
Mixed Member Proportional	100	13.76
First Past the Post plus leaders	50	6.88
Preferential Voting	48	6.60
Total votes cast	727	24.59
Registered voters	2,956	
Source "Plebiscite Report" (PDF).

=== Tignish-DeBlois, 1996–2007 ===
2003 Prince Edward Island general election
Party	Candidate	Votes	%	±%
Progressive Conservative	Gail A. Shea	1,480	55.29	-0.64
Liberal	Neil J. LeClair	1,177	43.97	+3.39
New Democratic	Reg T. Pendergast	20	0.75	-2.75
Total valid votes		2,677	100.0	
Progressive Conservative hold		Swing		-2.02

2000 Prince Edward Island general election
Party	Candidate	Votes	%	±%
Progressive Conservative	Gail A. Shea	1,472	55.93	+12.04
Liberal	Neil J. LeClair	1,068	40.58	-13.39
New Democratic	Reg T. Pendergast	92	3.50	+1.36
Total valid votes		2,632	100.0	
Progressive Conservative gain from Liberal		Swing		+12.72

1996 Prince Edward Island general election
Party	Candidate	Votes	%
Liberal	Robert J. Morrissey	1,413	53.97
Progressive Conservative	Gail A. Shea	1,149	43.89
New Democratic	Howard Waite	56	2.14
Total valid votes		2,618	100.0
This district was created from parts of the dual-member riding of 1st Prince.

== See also ==
- List of Prince Edward Island provincial electoral districts
- Canadian provincial electoral districts
