= Lot 1, Prince Edward Island =

Township in Canada

- Township
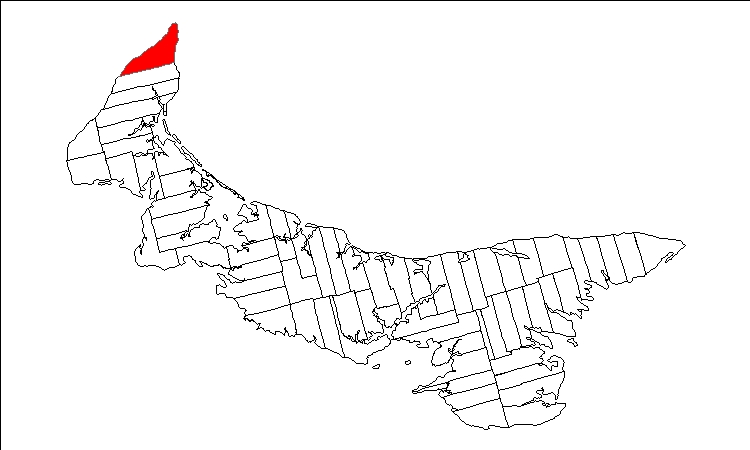
- Map of Prince Edward Island highlighting Lot 1
- Coordinates: 46°57′N 64°5′W
- Country: Canada
- Province: Prince Edward Island
- County: Prince County
- Parish: North Parish

Area
  - Total: 96.39 km^{2} (37.22 sq mi)

Population (2006)
  - Total: 1,881
  - Density: 19.5/km^{2} (51/sq mi)
- Time zone: UTC-4 (AST)
  - Summer (DST): UTC-3 (ADT)
- Canadian Postal code: C0B
- Area code: 902
- NTS Map: 021I16
- GNBC Code: BAEQN

Lot 1 is a township in Prince County, Prince Edward Island, Canada created during the 1764–1766 survey of Samuel Holland. It is part of North Parish.

== Population ==
Historical population
| Year | Pop. | ±% |
|---|---|---|
| 1871 | 2,561 | — |
| 1881 | 2,787 | +8.8% |
| 1891 | 2,950 | +5.8% |
| 1901 | 2,822 | −4.3% |
| 1911 | 2,585 | −8.4% |
| 1921 | 2,516 | −2.7% |
| 1931 | 2,591 | +3.0% |
| 1941 | 2,424 | −6.4% |
| 1996 | 1,936 | −20.1% |
| 2001 | 1,900 | −1.9% |
| 2006 | 1,881 | −1.0% |

== Communities ==
Incorporated municipalities:

- St. Felix
- Tignish
- Tignish Shore

Civic address communities:

- Anglo Tignish
- Ascension
- Christopher Cross
- Harper
- Judes Point
- Leoville
- Nail Pond
- Norway
- Palmer Road
- Peterville
- Pleasant View
- Seacow Pond
- Skinners Pond
- St. Felix
- St. Peter and St. Paul
- Tignish
- Tignish Corner
- Tignish Shore
- Waterford

== History ==
The township went through various owners under feudalism when Prince Edward Island was a British colony prior to Canadian Confederation:

- Sir Philip Stephens, 1st Baronet First Secretary of the Admiralty (1767-1810)
- In Chancery (1838)
- Messrs. Palmer and Ed. Cunard, Esq. (1864)
