= Lot 3, Prince Edward Island =

- Township
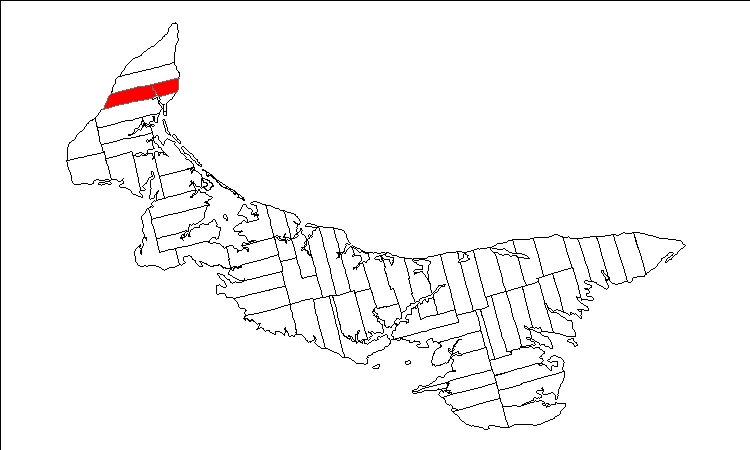
- Map of Prince Edward Island highlighting Lot 3
- Coordinates: 46°53′N 64°7′W
- Country: Canada
- Province: Prince Edward Island
- County: Prince County
- Parish: North Parish

Area
  - Total: 86.81 km^{2} (33.52 sq mi)

Population (2006)
  - Total: 899
  - Density: 10.4/km^{2} (27/sq mi)
- Time zone: UTC-4 (AST)
  - Summer (DST): UTC-3 (ADT)
- Canadian Postal code: C0B
- Area code: 902
- NTS Map: 021I16
- GNBC Code: BAEQP

Lot 3 is a township in Prince County, Prince Edward Island, Canada created during the 1764–1766 survey of Samuel Holland. It is part of North Parish.

== Population ==
Historical population
Year	Pop.	±%
1871	1,149	—
1881	1,355	+17.9%
1891	1,412	+4.2%
1901	1,439	+1.9%
1911	1,298	−9.8%
1921	1,042	−19.7%
1931	899	−13.7%
1941	937	+4.2%
1996	893	−4.7%
2001	864	−3.2%
2006	899	+4.1%

== Communities ==
Incorporated municipalities:

- Greenmount-Montrose

Civic address communities:

- Alma
- Central Kildare
- Elmsdale
- Greenmount
- Huntley
- Kildare Capes
- Lauretta
- Montrose
- Roseville
- St. Edward
- St. Lawrence
- Woodvale

== History ==
The township went through various owners under feudalism when Prince Edward Island was a British colony prior to Canadian Confederation:

- Chauncy Townsend, Esq. (M.P.). (1767-1810)
- Various. (1838)
- Benj. Bowring, Esq., Jas. Yeo, Esq., and others. (1864)
