= Immaculate Conception Church (Palmer Road) =

Coordinates: 46.9562°N 64.1010°W

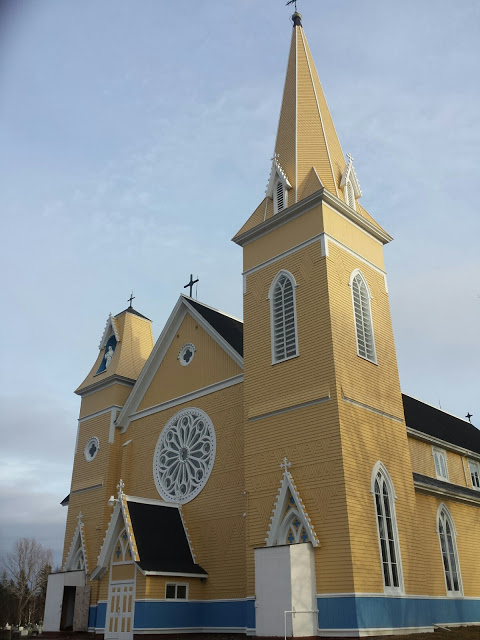
- Immaculate Conception Church in 2015
- Immaculate Conception Church
- Location: Palmer Road, Prince Edward Island
- Country: Canada
- Denomination: Roman Catholic

History
- Former name: St. Thomas Mission
- Founded: 1892

Architecture
- Architect: Francois-Xavier Edouard Meloche

Clergy
- Bishop: Richard Grecco
- Priest: Albin Arsenault

The Immaculate Conception Church, known colloquially as Palmer Road Church is a 19th-century Roman Catholic church located in Palmer Road, Prince Edward Island, Canada. The church is a white wooden Gothic architecture, and it was constructed in 1892.

As of 2014, the church offers Saturday, Sunday and weekday services, and it serves Palmer Road, St. Louis, Miminegash, Pleasant View, Skinner's Pond, southern Harper Road, and other communities. The church is located at the intersection of Routes 155 and 156, across from the Palmer Road Community Center.

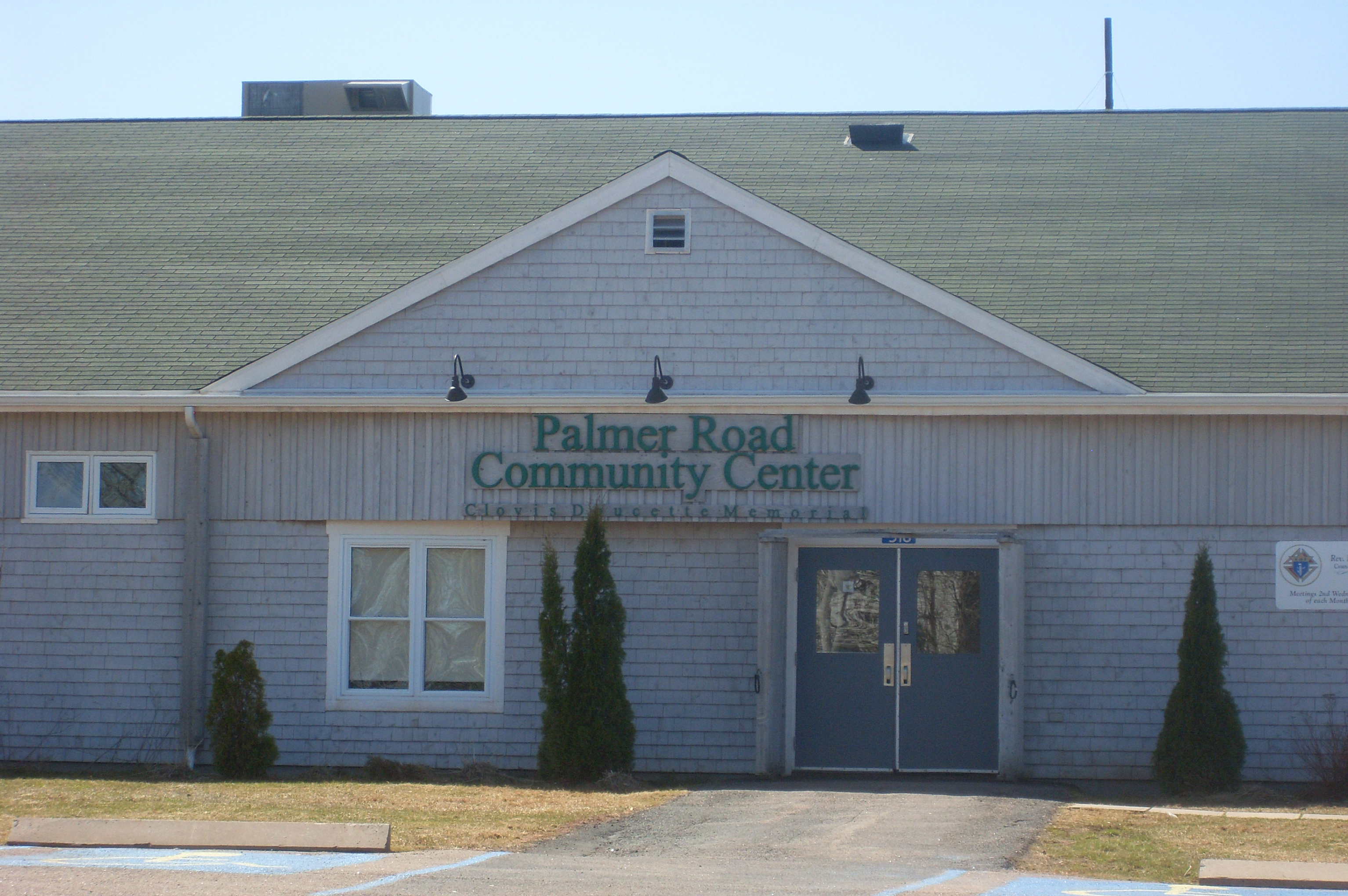
Adjacent community centre.

== History ==
The original church at the site was built in 1867, and was originally known as the St. Thomas Mission, a mission of the St. Simon & St. Jude Church in nearby Tignish. In 1878, the church separated from St. Simon & St. Jude and became its parish.

In 1890, the original church burned down, and was replaced by the now-existing church in 1892. Designed by Francois Xavier Edouard Meloche (1855–1917) to replace the original, much smaller mission which was destroyed by fire on May 24, 1890, the cornerstone was laid on August 15, 1892 on The Feast of the Acadians.

The church is a wooden Gothic structure, and is the oldest wooden church on Prince Edward Island. The church is an architectural gem of considerable importance, not only to the island, but to Canada as a whole. This is so not only because of its fine design and craftsmanship, both inside and out, but also because of its association with Francois Xavier Meloche, an artist/architect who has yet to take his proper place in the annals of Canadian art.

In 2007, it was proposed by overseeing Bishop Vernon Fougere that the Immaculate Conception parish be dissolved and merged with nearby St. Simon & St. Jude parish due to declining church attendance. This proposal was largely rejected by Immaculate Conception pastor Fr. Arthur Pendergast and parishioners alike.

== See also ==
- St. Simon & St. Jude Church
