= Prince Edward Island Route 153 =

Highway in Prince Edward Island, Canada

Coordinates: 46.888°N 64.0479°W

Route 153

Route information
- Maintained by Prince Edward Island Department of Transportation and Infrastructure Renewal

Major junctions
- South end: Route 152 in Montrose
- North end: Route 2 / Route 14 in Tignish

Location
- Country: Canada
- Province: Prince Edward Island

Highway system
- Provincial highways in Prince Edward Island
← Route 152	→ Route 154

Greenmount Road, labelled Route 153, is a 2-lane collector highway in western Prince County, Prince Edward Island, Canada. It is between the communities of Tignish and Alberton. Its maximum speed limit is 90 km/h (56 mph). The road is considered part of two larger communities, Tignish and Alberton.

The highway runs from Route 14 (North Cape Coastal) in Tignish, to Route 152 (Union Road) in Montrose, passing through the communities of Tignish, St. Felix, Greenmount, and Montrose.

== History ==
Route 153 (Greenmount Road) spans approximately 6 miles from Tignish to Montrose. The entire road was paved in the 1980s. It is home to the Greenmount Cemetery, the St. Felix Community Center, and the St. Felix Golf Course. Sections on Route 153 north of Haywood Road intersection are considered part of the Tignish community, and sections south of here are part of Alberton area.

== Other information ==
Addresses on Route 153 south of Route 162 (O'Rourke Road) intersection receive electrical power from the St. Louis/Bloomfield power substation. Addresses north of here receive from Tignish/Elmsdale. Basic cable service from Eastlink has been available from civic numbers 800–1600 Greenmount Road since 1995. High speed internet from Aliant Telecom has been available from civic numbers 1200–1600 since 2004.

=== List of roads merging off Route 153 ===
- Route 14 - Route 14 (Tignish)
- O'Rourke Rd - Route 162 (Greenmount)
- Union Rd - Route 152 (Montrose)
- Williams Ln (Greenmount)
- Martin Rd (Greenmount)
- Little Tignish Rd (St. Felix)
- Old Greenmount Rd (St. Felix)
- Christopher Rd (St. Felix)
- Chiasson Rd (Tignish)
- Mill St (Tignish)
- Phillip St (Tignish)
- Dalton Av (Tignish)
- Haywood Rd (Greenmount)
- Birch Grove Rd (Montrose)
