= Prince Edward Island Route 154 =

Highway in Prince Edward Island, Canada

Coordinates: 46°52′14.20″N 64°2′9.70″W

Route 154

Route information
- Maintained by Prince Edward Island Department of Transportation and Infrastructure Renewal

Major junctions
- West end: Route 152 in Montrose
- East end: Route 12 in Central Kildare

Location
- Country: Canada
- Province: Prince Edward Island

Highway system
- Provincial highways in Prince Edward Island
← Route 153	→ Route 155

Pridham Road, labelled Route 154, is a 2-lane collector highway in western Prince County, Prince Edward Island, Canada. It is near the town of Alberton. Its maximum speed limit is 80 km/h (50 mph).

The highway runs from Route 152 (Union Road) to Route 12, the Lady Slipper Drive, passing through the communities of Montrose and Central Kildare.

== Additional information ==
Pridham Road is a secondary highway in Prince Edward Island. Other nearby busy secondary highways include Union Road (Route 152), Greenmount Road (Route 153), and DeBlois Road (Route 157). Addresses on Pridham Road receive electric power from the St. Louis/Bloomfield substation. Neither basic cable service nor high speed internet from Aliant Telecom has ever been available on Pridham Road. The entire road has been paved since 1979 with the exception of the easternmost ¼ mile.

Schoolchildren on Pridham Road attend Alberton Elementary School for English classes, and St. Louis Elementary School for French language immersion classes. As for emergency services, Alberton Fire Department services the entirety of the road.

=== List of roads merging from Route 154 ===
- Hardy Road
- Route 12
- Union Road - Route 152
- Birch Grove Road
- McMillan Road

== See also ==
- Alberton
- Tignish
- Palmer Road
