= Prince Edward Island Route 14 =

Highway in Prince Edward Island, Canada

Route 14

Route information
- Maintained by Prince Edward Island Department of Transportation and Infrastructure Renewal
- Length: 82.2 km (51.1 mi)

Major junctions
- South end: Route 2 in Coleman
- North end: Route 2 in Tignish

Location
- Country: Canada
- Province: Prince Edward Island
- Counties: Prince

Highway system
- Provincial highways in Prince Edward Island
← Route 13	→ Route 15

Route 14 is a two-lane, uncontrolled-access, secondary highway in western Prince Edward Island. The route is entirely in Prince County and generally parallels Route 2 as it heads toward the North Cape. Its southern terminus is at Route 2 in Coleman and its northern terminus is at Route 2 in Tignish.

== Route description ==
The route begins at its southern terminus and heads southwest. It then reaches Brae and heads westward. It turns left in Glenwood and continues west until West Point, where it turns north. In West Cape, it curves to the northeast and continues that way until it reaches Nail Pond, where it curves to the south and ends at its northern terminus.

== Junction list ==
County	Location	km	mi	Junction	Notes
Prince County	Coleman	0.0	0.0	Route 2	
Prince County	Hebron	12.2	7.6	Route 164	Eastern terminus of concurrency with Route 164
Prince County	Hebron	12.4	7.7	Route 164	Western terminus of concurrency with Route 164
Prince County	Glenwood	15.5	9.6	Route 176	
Prince County	West Cape	28.4	17.6	Route 142	
Prince County	West Cape	33.8	21.0	Route 147	
Prince County	Burton	37.0	23.0	Route 146	
Prince County	Burton	44.2	27.5	Route 143	
Prince County	Burton	44.6	27.7	Route 145	
Prince County	Roseville	49.2	30.6	Route 148	
Prince County	Saint Lawrence	52.8	32.8	Route 151	
Prince County	Miminegash	56.9	35.6	Route 152	
Prince County	Pleasant View	63.0	39.1	Route 155	
Prince County	Nail Pond	73.8	45.9	Route 160	
Prince County	Christopher Cross	77.9	48.4	Route 182	
Prince County	Christopher Cross	79.0	49.1	Route 161	
Prince County	Tignish	82.2	51.1	Route 2	
