= Prince Edward Island Route 160 =

Highway in Prince Edward Island, Canada

Coordinates: 46.9615°N 64.0679°W

Route 160

Route information
- Maintained by Prince Edward Island Department of Transportation and Infrastructure Renewal

Major junctions
- From: Route 14
- To: Route 2

Location
- Country: Canada
- Province: Prince Edward Island

Highway system
- Provincial highways in Prince Edward Island

Ascension Road, labelled Route 160, is a 2-lane collector highway in western Prince County, Prince Edward Island, Canada. It is located 2 miles (3.2 km) NW of the community of Tignish. Its maximum speed limit is 80 kilometres per hour (50 mph).

The highway runs from Route 14 (Shore Road) to Route 2, the Veteran's Memorial Highway, passing through the communities of Ascension and Nail Pond.

== History ==
As part of the Prince Edward Island Railway (now the Confederation Trail), an overpass bridge that transported trains until 1990 crosses directly over the Ascension Road at approximately 0.21 mi (0.34 km) north of the road's commencement at Route 2. Due to the bridge's low height, there is no pavement on the section of the road underneath the bridge. The remainder of the road, however, is paved. In 2000, under the direction of Prince Edward Island Director of Transportation, Gail Shea, an identical bridge in nearby Harper Road was demolished and the trail was lowered to road level. Protests were made to do the same in Ascension, and the bridge in Ascension remains the only one on Prince Edward Island.

== Other information ==
Ascension Road is a secondary highway in Prince Edward Island, and is one of the busiest secondary highways in the Tignish area. Other nearby busy secondary highways include Harper Road (Route 158), Union Road (Route 152), and Greenmount Road (Route 153). Addresses on the entire Ascension Road receive electric power from the Elmsdale/Tignish substation. Basic cable service from Eastlink has been available for civic addresses 1—900 on Ascension Road since 1995, and High speed internet from Aliant Telecom has been available from civic addresses 1—600 since 2005.

=== List of roads linking from Ascension Road ===
- Phillip St (Tignish)
- Shore Rd - Route 14 (Nail Pond)
- Peter Rd - Route 159 (Peterville)
- Maple St (Ascension)
- Doucette Rd (Ascension)
- Palmer Rd - Route 156 (Palmer Road)
