= Prince Edward Island Route 156 =

Highway in Prince Edward Island, Canada

Coordinates: 46.929979°N 64.133007°W

Route 156

Route information
- Maintained by Prince Edward Island Department of Transportation and Infrastructure Renewal

Major junctions
- From: Route 152
- To: Back Settlement Road

Location
- Country: Canada
- Province: Prince Edward Island

Highway system
- Provincial highways in Prince Edward Island

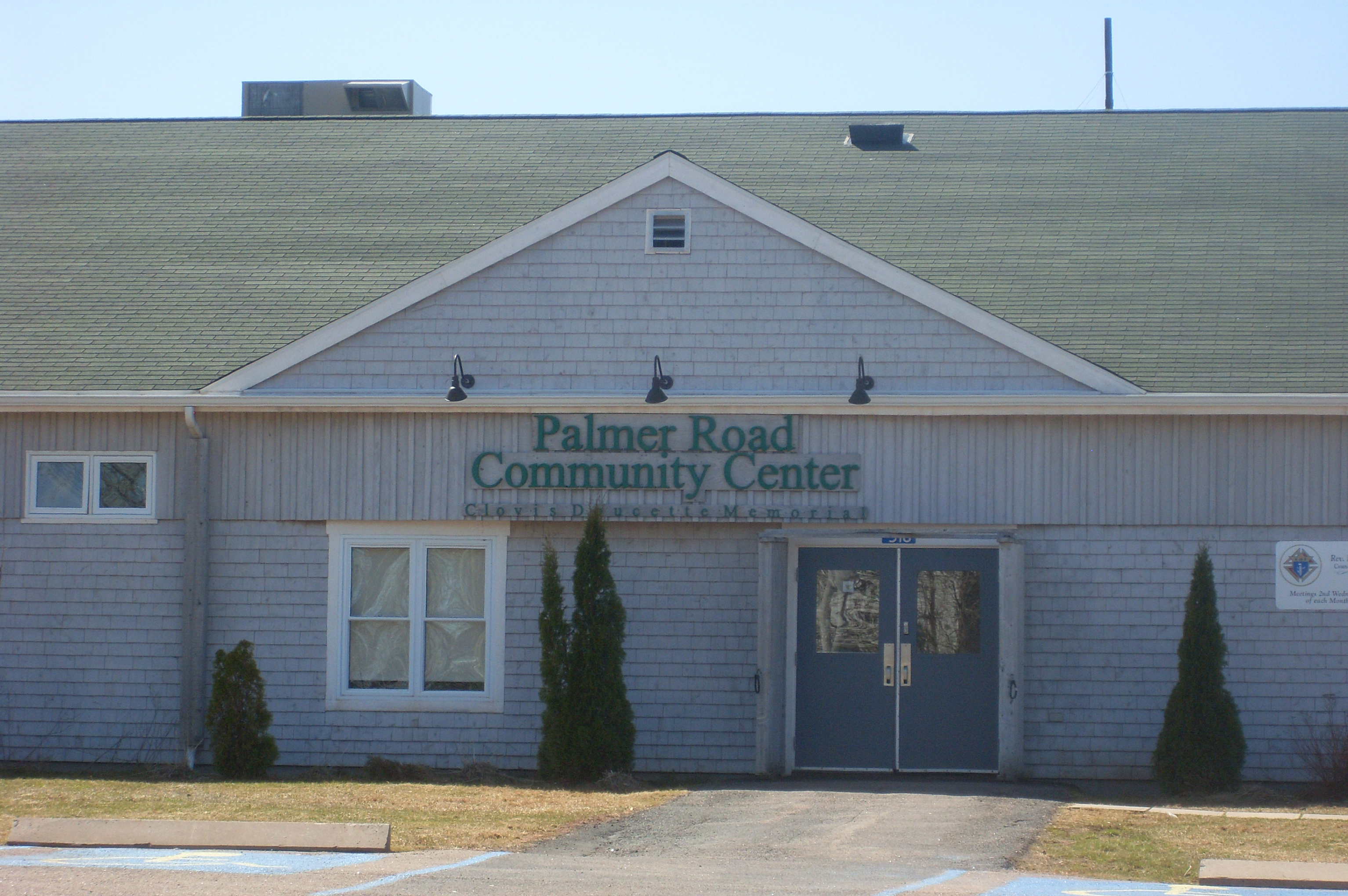
Palmer Road's community center.

Palmer Road, labelled Route 156, is a 2-lane collector highway in western Prince County, Prince Edward Island, Canada. It is between the communities of Tignish and Miminegash. Its maximum speed limit is 80 km/h (50 mph). The road is considered part of two larger communities, Tignish and Miminegash.

The highway runs from Route 152 (Union Road) in St. Edward, to Back Settlement Road in Nail Pond, passing through the communities of St. Edward, St. Louis, Palmer Road, and Nail Pond.

== History ==
Route 156 (Palmer Road) is one of the longest continuous secondary highways in Prince Edward Island. It spans 8 miles from Miminegash to Nail Pond. Only the middle section of Route 156 was paved, leaving the northernmost section near Nail Pond as dirt road, as well as the southern section near St. Edward. The middle section is located in the Palmer Road community, and was first paved in 1981. It is home to the Immaculate Conception Church and another Catholic church establishment further north. The currently paved section was repaved in 2004. Sections on Route 156 north of Knox Lane intersection are considered part of the Tignish community, and sections south of here are part of St. Louis/Miminegash.

The highway runs through the community of Palmer Road, which is part of PEI's electoral district #27, Tignish-Palmer Road. This district was formerly called Tignish-DeBlois, but renamed to include the Palmer Road name in 2007.

== Other information ==
Almost all addresses on Route 156 receive electrical power from the St. Louis/Bloomfield power substation—only addresses in the Nail Pond/Ascension area receive from Elmsdale/Tignish. Basic cable service from Eastlink nor High speed internet from Aliant Telecom have ever been available in Route 156.

=== List of roads merging off Route 156 ===
- Union Rd - Route 152 (Miminegash)
- Thompson Rd - Route 155 (Palmer Road)
- Ascension Rd - Route 160 (Nail Pond)
- Harper Rd - Route 158 (Palmer Road)
- Provost Rd (Leoville)
- Knox Ln (Skinner's Pond)
- Brennan Rd (Peterville)
- Back Settlement Rd (Nail Pond)
