= Kildare (disambiguation) =

Kildare may refer to:

== Places ==
=== Australia ===
- Kildare, Victoria, Australia, now known as Geelong West

=== Canada ===
- Kildare (Edmonton), a residential neighbourhood in Edmonton, Canada
- Kildare Township in Quebec, see Saint-Ambroise-de-Kildare and Sainte-Marcelline-de-Kildare
- Kildare Capes, Prince Edward Island, a settlement on Prince Edward Island

=== Ireland ===
- County Kildare, an administrative region in the east of the Republic of Ireland
  - Kildare, the town from which the county name is derived
  - Kildare railway station, the railway station in Kildare, County Kildare, Ireland
  - History of County Kildare, a history of the county
  - Kildare Abbey

=== United States ===
- Kildare-McCormick House, historic residence in Huntsville, Alabama, United States, named after the county in Ireland where the first owner was born
- Kildare, Oklahoma, United States
- Kildare, Texas, United States, an unincorporated community
- Kildare, Wisconsin, United States

== Irish constituencies ==
The county of Kildare in Ireland has been represented by several parliamentary constituencies:

=== Parliament of Ireland, to 1800 ===
- Athy (Parliament of Ireland constituency) (1614–1800)
- Harristown (Parliament of Ireland constituency) (1684–1800)
- Kildare Borough (Parliament of Ireland constituency) (????–1800)
- County Kildare (Parliament of Ireland constituency) (????–1800)
- Naas (Parliament of Ireland constituency) (1570–1800)

=== House of Commons of the United Kingdom, (1801–1922) and First Dáil (1918) ===
- County Kildare (UK Parliament constituency) (1801–1885)
- North Kildare (UK Parliament constituency) (1885–1922)
- South Kildare (UK Parliament constituency) (1885–1922)

=== Dáil Éireann (since 1918) ===
- Kildare–Wicklow (1921–1923)
- Kildare (Dáil constituency) (1923–1937)
- Kildare (Dáil constituency) (1948–1997)
- Kildare North (Dáil constituency) (1997–)
- Kildare South (Dáil constituency) (1997–)

== People ==
- Brigid of Kildare, an Irish saint also known as Saint Brigid
- D. Kildare, an American poet
- Owen Kildare (1864–1911), an American writer
- Earl of Kildare, an Irish peerage title since 1316
- Kildare Dobbs, a Canadian writer

== Fictional characters ==
- Dr. Kildare, from a series of American films in the 1930s and 1940s, also a 1950s radio series and a 1960s television series
- Young Dr. Kildare, 1938 film starring Lew Ayres as the idealistic but somewhat immature young medical doctor
- Kildare (comics), a comic book character from Image Comics

== Organisations ==
- Kildare College, a secondary college for girls in Australia
- Kildare County Council, the local authority for County Kildare
- Kildare County F.C., a football club from Newbridge, County Kildare
- Kildare GAA, responsible for Gaelic Games in County Kildare
- Kildare Senior Football Championship, competition between the top Kildare Clubs
- Kildare Senior Hurling Championship, competition between the top Kildare Clubs
- Kildare Catholic College, a secondary college in Australia
- Kildare's Irish Pub, a popular "Irish" pub

== Music ==
- The Killdares, an Irish band
