= St. Simon & St. Jude Church (Tignish) =

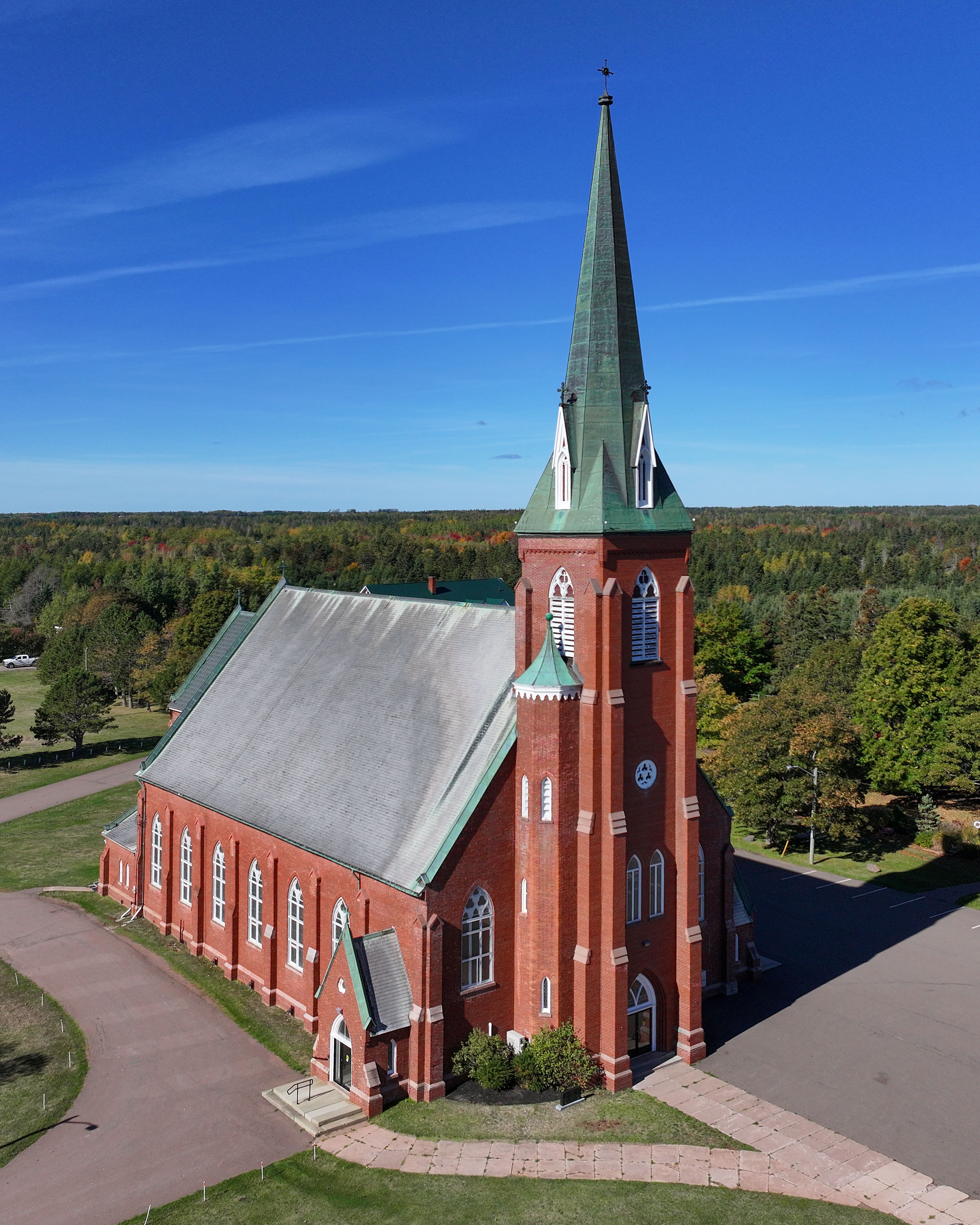
- The church in 2025
- St. Simon & St. Jude Church
- 46.952995°N 64.036438°W
- Location: Tignish, Prince Edward Island
- Country: Canada
- Denomination: Roman Catholic

History
- Founded: 19th century
- Consecrated: 1860

Clergy
- Bishops: Joseph Dabrowski CSMA (2024–present); Richard Grecco (2009–2023); Vernon Fougere (1992–2009)
- Priests: Tim Broderick (2024–present); John Molina (2017–2024); Brendon Gallant (2011–2017); James Willick (2003–2011); Albin Arsenault (1990–2003)

St. Simon & St. Jude Church, known colloquially as Tignish Church, is a 19th-century Roman Catholic church in Tignish parish, Prince Edward Island, Canada. As of 2006, it is the largest church in the province, 56 metres (185 ft) high. It is visible from 9.7 kilometres (6 mi) away on flat land and from further at sea.

The church and the post office are two of the few conserved structures remaining in Tignish. Surrounding churches include Immaculate Conception Church, 6 miles southwest on Palmer Road, and Greenmount United Church, 8.0 kilometres (5 mi) south. Many parish outsiders, such as those on Palmer Road or in Alberton parishes, attend services here.

== History ==
Although religious services were held by Tignish residents since its founding in 1799, an established place of worship waited two years. In 1801, the Acadian settlers here built a log church measuring 9.1 by 7.6 metres (30 by 25 ft). Although they had no priest, they gathered within and read prayers from the Gospel every week. In 1826, this building was destroyed to make way for a larger building, 18 by 14 metres (60 by 45 ft).

In 1844, the area of Tignish was construed as a parish. With the arrival of new priest Peter MacIntyre, the church received major indoor renovations and he became its first resident parish priest. He served the third-longest as priest, from 1844 to 1860. In 1851, he introduced a church organ and oversaw the move to a new location near the Dalton Schoolhouse.

=== Construction ===
With the assistance of many volunteering workers from Tignish and outlying areas, construction on the present–day St. Simon & St. Jude Church began in 1857 and was made entirely of an outer domestic brick structure and wood on the inside. The twelve tall and large columns located in the church were made of only one large tree that was extracted from nearby Center Line Road by bobsled and horses.

The construction of the church was completed, to an extent, in 1860, and was also consecrated in this year. André Roy was the parish priest at the time and would quickly be succeeded by Dugald M. McDonald in 1861. The amateur photographer Henry J. Cundall visited the church in 1862 and photographed it, after climbing the spire a year or two earlier.

=== Organ ===
In 1882 a 1,118-pipe church organ was installed by longtime priest Dugald M. McDonald. Purchased for CA$2,400 in 1882, its retail value as of 2006 was an estimated US$1 million. It has featured in many of the documentations by Henry Gaudet, a former parishioner, and in newscasts and newspapers. It was manually operated by hand pump until electricity came to Tignish in 1959. It still sits at the church today.

=== 1888 renovation ===
In 1888, parishioners decided the church interior needed redesigning. Redecoration lightened colors and brightened the overall mood. Approximately $3,100 was raised locally for renovation. A large amount of decoration was added and a Montreal painter, François Meloche, brought in to paint the lifesized portraits of the Twelve Apostles, the stained glass windows and Stations of the Cross paintings. Until 11 September 1888, he lived in Tignish and performed other minor touchups, including in shades of grey. Others did similarly until 2001.

=== 2001 renovation ===
In 2001, the church interior was renovated again, restoring it more closely to its original look. A replica of the original high altar was built by local craftsmen and installed near a restoration of the original pulpit and baptismal font. Carpets removed from the sanctuary were replaced with hardwood flooring. The ceiling was repainted blue with shining stars.

=== 2006 and 2007 apparitions ===
In March 2006, parishioner Angela Callaghan saw what she believed was the face of either Jesus or Mary, mother of Jesus, in a decorative cloth during the church's Easter celebration. Within the day, local news crews flocked to the church to document the event. The story appeared in all the Prince Edward Island newspapers. Other people claimed to have been transformed by the vision. The church's pastor, James Willick, had no explanation for it.

In 2006, another parishioner claimed to have seen an image of Jesus and the Virgin Mary in the wood of a cross in the sanctuary.

== See also ==
- Harper Road, Tignish
- Ascension, Tignish
- St. Felix, Tignish
