= Prince Edward Island Route 159 =

Highway in Prince Edward Island, Canada

Coordinates: 46.9478°N 64.0866°W

Route 159

Route information
- Maintained by Prince Edward Island Department of Transportation and Infrastructure Renewal

Major junctions
- From: Route 158
- To: Route 160

Location
- Country: Canada
- Province: Prince Edward Island

Highway system
- Provincial highways in Prince Edward Island

Peter Road, or Peterville Road, labelled Route 159, is a 2-lane collector highway in western Prince County, Prince Edward Island, Canada. It is near the community of Tignish. Its maximum speed limit is 80 km/h (50 mph).

The highway runs from Route 158 (Harper Road) to Route 160 (Ascension Road) passing through the communities of Peterville, Leoville, and Ascension.

== History ==
The southern half of the road, from Route 158 (Harper Road) to about 1.50 miles NW, was first paved in 1979, followed by the northern half of the road from Route 160 (Ascension) to 1.50 miles SW in 1980. Part of the remaining dirt section was paved in 2004, and now there remains only about 200 yards of unpaved road on Route 159. The northernmost 800 metres of Peter Road was resurfaced in July 2008.

== Other information ==
Addresses from the Route 160 (Ascension Road) intersection SW to before the clay road receive electric power from the Elmsdale/Tignish substation, and remaining addresses from the other end of the clay road to Route 158 (Harper Road) receive electric power from St. Louis/Bloomfield division. Basic cable service from Eastlink is not available on the road, but High speed internet from Aliant Telecom is available from civic addresses 550–900 on Route 159.

=== List of roads merging off Route 159 ===
- Harper Rd - Route 158 (Leoville)
- Ascension Rd - Route 160 (Ascension)
- Gunion Rd (Peterville)
- Brennan Rd (Peterville)
- Gavin Rd (Ascension)
