= Merritt E. Callaghan Intermediate School =

M.E Callaghan Intermediate School

Location
- 41870 Western Rd – Route 2 Profit's Corner, Prince Edward Island, C0B 1K0; Canada; 46°53′58″N 64°04′52″W

Information
- School type: Intermediate school
- School board: Public Schools Branch
- Principal: Kelly Pitre
- Grades: grades 7–9
- Enrollment: 500+
- Language: English (select French courses available)
- Website: www.edu.pe.ca/mecallaghan
- Last updated: 28 June 2022

Merritt E. Callaghan Intermediate School is an intermediate school providing education for 7th to 9th grade students in the Tignish, Alberton, St. Louis, and Miminegash areas of western Prince County, Prince Edward Island, Canada. It is part of the Public Schools Branch of PEI. The school is named after the late Merritt Edwin Callaghan, a former educator.

== History ==
In 1975, Merritt Callaghan School was built at the expense of discontinuing more localized intermediate education that was taking place at Tignish Intermediate, St. Edward Intermediate, Alberton Intermediate, and other schools. The decision was made to merge all of these former schools into one by then–Minister of Education, Bennett Campbell. Though some were against the initial change, many now feel it was an appropriate move.

== Extracurricular activities ==
The school offers many sport activities, such as soccer, intramurals, and more. Holidays are celebrated in the school with activities such as the Christmas Prom, as well as Valentine's Day and St. Patrick's Day–related activities.

== See also ==
- List of schools in Prince Edward Island
- List of school districts in Prince Edward Island
- Holland College
- University of Prince Edward Island
