= Jacques Cartier (disambiguation) =

Jacques Cartier (1491–1557) was a French explorer.

Jacques Cartier may also refer to:

== People ==
- Jacques Cartier (businessman) (1750–1814), Canadian entrepreneur and politician
- Jacques Cartier (jeweler) (1885–1942), French jeweller

== Places ==
=== Québec, Canada ===
Natural features

- Jacques-Cartier River
- Jacques Cartier Strait
- Mont Jacques-Cartier, mountain
- Lac-Jacques-Cartier, Quebec

Man-made features

- Jacques Cartier Monument (Montreal)
- Place Jacques-Cartier, street
- Jacques Cartier Bridge, a.k.a. Pont Jacques-Cartier

Parks

- Jacques-Cartier National Park
- Jacques-Cartier Park (Gatineau)

Populated places

- La Jacques-Cartier Regional County Municipality
- Sainte-Catherine-de-la-Jacques-Cartier
- Ville Jacques-Cartier, Montreal
- Jacques-Cartier, Sherbrooke

Electoral districts

- Jacques-Cartier, provincial electoral district
- Jacques Cartier (electoral district), a federal electoral district in Quebec from 1867 to 1953
- Jacques-Cartier—Lasalle, former federal electoral district
- Portneuf—Jacques-Cartier, current federal electoral district

=== Prince Edward Island, Canada ===
- Jacques Cartier Provincial Park

=== New York, United States ===
- Jacques Cartier State Park

== Other uses ==
- French ship Jacques Cartier (L9033)
- Jacques Cartier Stakes
- CMA CGM Jacques Cartier, a containership
