= Gail Shea =

Canadian politician (1959–2025)

The Honourable Gail A. Shea PC

Minister of Fisheries and Oceans
- In office July 15, 2013 – November 4, 2015
- Prime Minister: Stephen Harper
- Preceded by: Keith Ashfield
- Succeeded by: Hunter Tootoo
- In office October 30, 2008 – May 18, 2011
- Prime Minister: Stephen Harper
- Preceded by: Loyola Hearn
- Succeeded by: Keith Ashfield

Minister of National Revenue
- In office May 18, 2011 – July 15, 2013
- Preceded by: Keith Ashfield
- Succeeded by: Kerry-Lynne Findlay

Member of Parliament for Egmont
- In office October 14, 2008 – August 4, 2015
- Preceded by: Joe McGuire
- Succeeded by: Bobby Morrissey

Member of the Legislative Assembly of Prince Edward Island for Tignish-DeBlois
- In office April 17, 2000 – May 28, 2007
- Preceded by: Bobby Morrissey
- Succeeded by: Neil LeClair

Personal details
- Born: Anne Marie Gail Doucette; April 6, 1959 Skinners Pond, Prince Edward Island, Canada
- Died: August 21, 2025 (aged 66) O'Leary, Prince Edward Island, Canada
- Party: Conservative
- Other political affiliations: Progressive Conservative Party of Prince Edward Island
- Spouse: Russell Shea (m. 1976; died 2021)
- Children: 5

Anne Marie Gail Shea PC (née Doucette; April 6, 1959 – August 21, 2025) was a Canadian politician who served as the Member of Parliament for Egmont from 2008 to 2015. She had previously been a member of the Legislative Assembly of Prince Edward Island from 2000 to 2007, representing the electoral district of Tignish-DeBlois as a member of the Progressive Conservative Party.

Shea served as the Minister of Fisheries and Oceans in the federal cabinet.

== Provincial politics ==
=== Minister of Community and Cultural Affairs ===
Shea served as Minister of Community and Cultural Affairs from 2000 to 2003, under the second administration of Premier Pat Binns. During this period Shea's responsibilities included the Status of Women in the province, as well as providing oversight on the Workers Compensation Board and the Island Waste Management Corporation.

=== Minister of Transportation and Public Works ===
From 2003 to 2007 Shea served as Minister of Transportation and Public Works. In this position, Shea oversaw the implementation of a graduated licensing system in her home province.

== Federal politics ==
Shea stood as the Conservative Party of Canada candidate in the riding of Egmont for the 2008 federal election. On October 14, 2008, she became the first non-Liberal MP from Prince Edward Island in 24 years. On October 30, 2008, Shea was appointed the federal Minister of Fisheries and Oceans. She is only the third female MP from Prince Edward Island, following Margaret Mary Macdonald and Catherine Callbeck.

In the 2011 federal election, Shea was re-elected by a margin of 4500 votes. On May 18, 2011, she was appointed Minister of National Revenue. In July 2013, Shea was moved back into the fisheries position. In the 2015 election, Shea was defeated by Liberal Bobby Morrissey.

=== Pie incident ===
On January 25, 2010, Shea was pied while giving a speech at the Canada Centre for Inland Waters. An American PETA activist, Emily McCoy, was arrested in Burlington in connection with the incident, and charged with assault. PETA took public responsibility for the incident, saying that it was part of a broader campaign against the Canadian Government's support of the seal hunt.

When commenting on the event later, Shea remarked, "I can tell you that this incident actually strengthens my resolve to support the seal hunt. If this is what it takes to stand up for Canadian sealing families and this industry I'm certainly very proud to do it."

== Personal life and death ==
She was born at Skinners Pond, Prince Edward Island on April 6, 1959, the daughter of Roy Ernest and Elva Mary (née Perry) Doucette. She married Russell Shea and had five children. Her husband, Russell, died in 2021. Outside of politics, she worked as a bookkeeper and worked for the Canada Revenue Agency and a tax centre in Summerside, Prince Edward Island.

Shea died at the age of 66 at a hospital in O'Leary, Prince Edward Island, on August 21, 2025. Hundreds of mourners attended her funeral on August 27, 2025, at St. Simon & St. Jude Church in Tignish.

== Electoral record ==
=== Federal ===
2015 Canadian federal election: Egmont
Party	Candidate	Votes	%	±%	Expenditures
Liberal	Bobby Morrissey	10,521	49.25	+17.94	$67,240.83
Conservative	Gail Shea	6,185	28.95	–25.70	$110,058.32
New Democratic	Herb Dickieson	4,097	19.18	+6.81	$34,718.49
Green	Nils Ling	559	2.62	+0.95	$4,895.27
Total valid votes/expense limit		21,362	99.59		$169,928.60
Total rejected ballots		87	0.41	–0.39	
Turnout		21,449	77.29	+5.62	
Eligible voters		27,751			
Liberal gain from Conservative		Swing		+21.82	
Source: Elections Canada

2011 Canadian federal election: Egmont
Party	Candidate	Votes	%	±%	Expenditures
Conservative	Gail Shea	10,467	54.65	+10.72	$57,565.04
Liberal	Guy Gallant	5,997	31.31	-12.32	$34,428.58
New Democratic	Jacquie Robichaud	2,369	12.37	+3.32	$1,780.97
Green	Carl Anthony	320	1.67	-1.72	$250.00
Total valid votes/expense limit		19,153	100.0		$69,831.16
Total rejected, unmarked and declined ballots		155	0.80	+0.18	
Turnout		19,308	71.67	+3.52	
Eligible voters		26,941			
Conservative hold		Swing		+11.52	

2008 Canadian federal election: Egmont
Party	Candidate	Votes	%	±%	Expenditures
Conservative	Gail Shea	8,110	43.93	+12.97	$51,795.67
Liberal	Keith Milligan	8,055	43.63	-9.54	$45,007.86
New Democratic	Orville Lewis	1,670	9.05	-0.50	$2,245.18
Green	Rebecca Ridlington	626	3.39	-1.80	$2,678.98
Total valid votes/expense limit		18,461	100.0		$67,686
Total rejected, unmarked and declined ballots		115	0.62	+0.01	
Turnout		18,576	68.15	-3.57	
Eligible voters		27,256			
Conservative gain from Liberal		Swing		+11.26	

=== Provincial ===
2007 Prince Edward Island general election: Tignish-Palmer Road
Party	Candidate	Votes	%	±%
Liberal	Neil LeClair	1,569	55.15	+11.18
Progressive Conservative	Gail Shea	1,276	44.85	−10.44
Total valid votes		2,845	100.0	
Liberal gain from Progressive Conservative		Swing		+10.81

2003 Prince Edward Island general election
Party	Candidate	Votes	%	±%
Progressive Conservative	Gail A. Shea	1,480	55.29	-0.64
Liberal	Neil J. LeClair	1,177	43.97	+3.39
New Democratic	Reg T. Pendergast	20	0.75	-2.75
Total valid votes		2,677	100.0	
Progressive Conservative hold		Swing		-2.02

2000 Prince Edward Island general election
Party	Candidate	Votes	%	±%
Progressive Conservative	Gail A. Shea	1,472	55.93	+12.04
Liberal	Neil J. LeClair	1,068	40.58	-13.39
New Democratic	Reg T. Pendergast	92	3.50	+1.36
Total valid votes		2,632	100.0	
Progressive Conservative gain from Liberal		Swing		+12.72

1996 Prince Edward Island general election: Tignish-DeBlois
Party	Candidate	Votes	%
Liberal	Robert Joseph Morrissey	1,413	53.97
Progressive Conservative	Gail A. Shea	1,149	43.89
New Democratic	Howard Waite	56	2.14
Total valid votes		2,618	100.0
This riding was created from parts of the dual-member riding of 1st Prince.
