= Neil LeClair =

Canadian politician

Neil J. LeClair

Member of the Legislative Assembly of Prince Edward Island for Tignish-Palmer Road
- In office June 12, 2007 – October 18, 2011
- Preceded by: Gail Shea
- Succeeded by: Hal Perry

Personal details
- Born: February 23, 1956 (age 70) Tignish, Prince Edward Island, Canada
- Party: Liberal

Neil J. LeClair (born 23 February 1956) is a Canadian politician.

He was elected to the Legislative Assembly of Prince Edward Island in the 2007 provincial election. He represented the electoral district of Tignish-Palmer Road and is a member of the Liberal Party.

On June 12, 2007, LeClair was appointed to the Executive Council of Prince Edward Island as Minister of Agriculture. In January 2009, LeClair was moved to Minister of Fisheries, Aquaculture and Rural Development. He was defeated by his Progressive Conservative opponent, Hal Perry in the 2011 election. In January 2015, LeClair announced he would again seek the riding's Liberals nomination for the 2015 election, but was defeated by Perry, who had crossed the floor to the Liberals in 2013.

== Election results ==
2007 Prince Edward Island general election: Tignish-Palmer Road
Party	Candidate	Votes	%	±%
Liberal	Neil LeClair	1,569	55.15	+11.18
Progressive Conservative	Gail Shea	1,276	44.85	−10.44
Total valid votes		2,845	100.0	
Liberal gain from Progressive Conservative		Swing		+10.81

2011 Prince Edward Island general election: Tignish-Palmer Road
Party	Candidate	Votes	%	±%
Progressive Conservative	Hal Perry	1,175	50.15	+5.30
Liberal	Neil LeClair	1,142	48.74	−6.41
Island	Derek D. Peters	26	1.11	
Total valid votes		2,343	100.0	
Progressive Conservative gain from Liberal		Swing		+5.86
