= Alberton, Prince Edward Island =

Alberton
- Town
- Town of Alberton
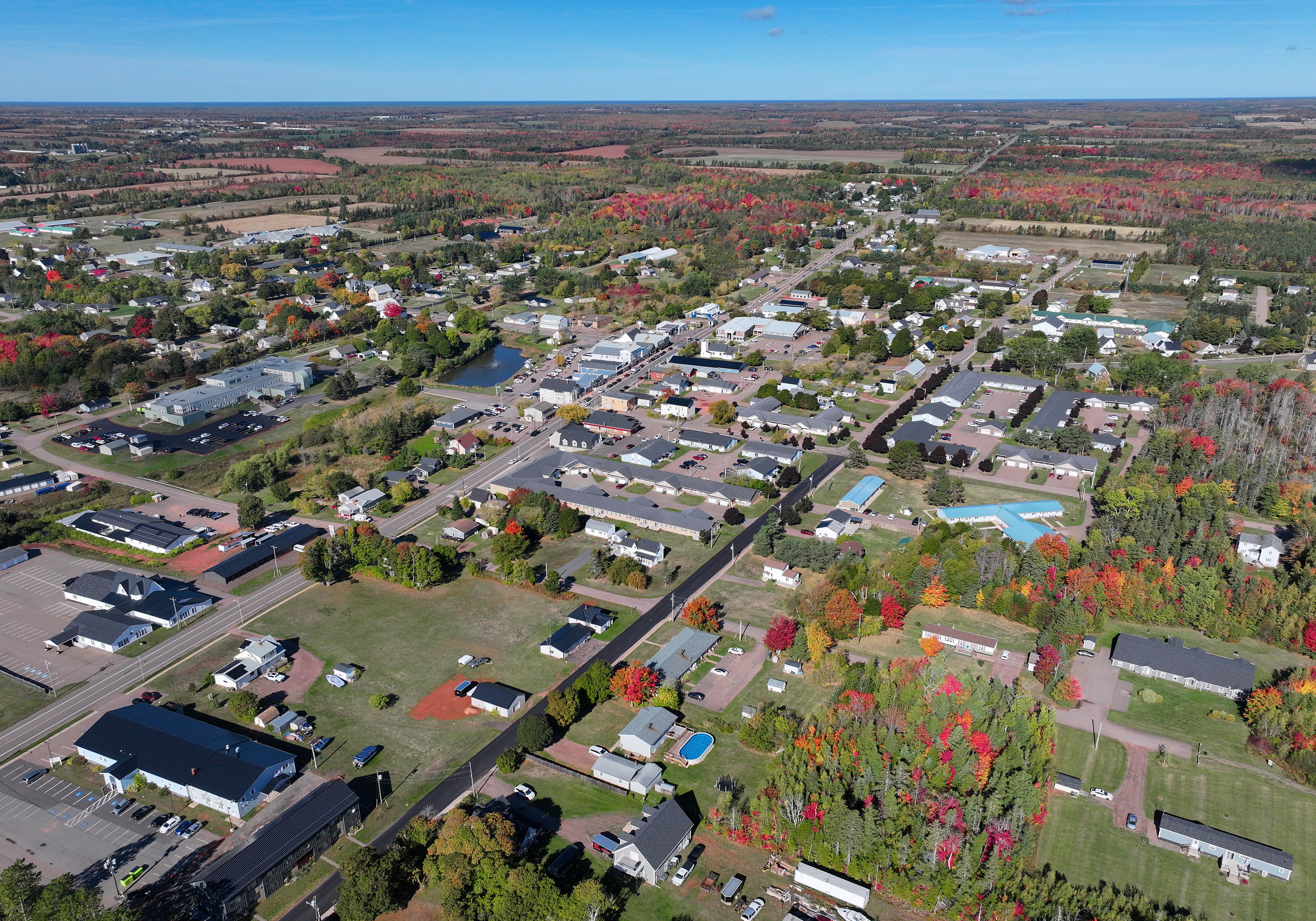
- Motto: "The Heart of West Prince"
- Alberton in Prince Edward Island
- Coordinates: 46.81382°N 64.06682°W
- Country: Canada
- Province: Prince Edward Island
- County: Prince County
- Parish: North Parish
- Township: Lot 5
- Founded: 1534
- Village: 1878
- Town: 1913

Government
  - Type: Town council
  - Mayor: Hector MacLeod
  - Councillors: Cameron Boyce; Maureen Chaisson; Alan Curtis; Holly Gordon; Mary Jean O'Brien; Krista Murphy
  - Town Administrator: Donna Thomson

Area
  - Town: 4.70 km^{2} (1.81 sq mi)

Population (2021)
  - Town: 1,301
  - Density: 277/km^{2} (720/sq mi)
  - Metro: 3,531
- Time zone: UTC-4 (AST)
  - Summer (DST): UTC-3 (ADT)
- Canadian postal code: C0B 1B0
- Area code: 902
- Telephone Exchanges: 206, 214, 231, 853, 856, 960
- NTS Map: 021I16
- GNBC Code: BADOW
- Website: Town of Alberton

Alberton is a Canadian town located in Prince County, Prince Edward Island. It is situated in the western part of the county in the township of Lot 5.

Alberton is a service centre for local fishing and farming communities, and is adjacent to the community and harbour of Northport.

== History ==
The area was long settled by the Mi'kmaq Nation. Europeans first ventured to the area in 1534 when French explorer Jacques Cartier recorded making landfall at nearby Cape Kildare during his journey of discovery in the Gulf of St. Lawrence and St. Lawrence River. Acadians settled on the island in small numbers through the 17th and 18th centuries but only moved in greater numbers to the western part of Ile-Saint-Jean and specifically north of present-day Alberton to the Tignish area following their expulsion by British military forces in the late 1750s.

Following British victory over France, the island's sovereignty passed to Britain in 1763. In 1765, Captain Samuel Holland surveyed the island and the British government instituted a feudal system of land ownership. The township of Lot 5, which contains present-day Alberton, was granted to Edward Lewis, a British Member of Parliament in the 1767 land lottery.

Northport, located near present-day Alberton began to be settled in the 1780s after Lewis made plans for a small trading town called "Lewis Town". Located at Bury Head in Northport, it was established in June 1788 and was first populated by local Acadians who had escaped expulsion three decades before British settlements. Scottish and Devonshire settlers were brought in by Lewis to settle his township.

A local shipbuilding industry and lumber trade at Northport brought prosperity to the area throughout the 1800s, although this went into decline as more forested areas were lost to agriculture, on account of the excellent soils in the area.

Alberton started to take shape in the 1840s and underwent several name changes including Cross Roads, The Cross, and Stump Town. The nearby shipbuilding, lumber and shipping industries had resulted in developing a sustainable community which was a major trade centre in western Prince County. In 1862, it was named in honour of Albert Edward, the Prince of Wales, who later became King Edward VII and who had visited Prince Edward Island in 1860. The community was named Alberton on 27 June 1862.

=== Railways and other constructions ===
In 1872, the Prince Edward Island Railway was constructed, making the port at Northport, adjacent to Alberton, its western terminus. It connected Alberton with communities to the east such as O'Leary, Summerside, Charlottetown, Georgetown and Souris.

The western terminus was subsequently extended further from Alberton to Tignish in a sharp diversion just east of the Alberton passenger station, where a wye was constructed and a small railway yard, leading to the spur to Northport. Alberton went into its own terminus during this period, with various mills, manufacturing businesses, stores and services. The community became a village in 1878, and became home to a court house and justice centre for western Prince County that year.

Alberton became the centre of the worldwide silver fox industry when Charles Dalton and Robert Oulton began farming the fur-bearing animals on an island in the harbour at Northport in 1894, bringing tremendous prosperity to area residents and business owners. Despite a fire that devastated part of the town the following year, Alberton quickly reflected its growing economic importance of the village. The railway constructed a new passenger station designed by architect Charles Benjamin Chappell for Alberton in the early 1900s entirely out of stone, one of only two such stations on the island (the other being in Kensington).

The fox farming industry brought increased growth in the population and tax base for the community, which resulted in an upgrade from village status, becoming an incorporated town in May 1913. Silver fox farming remained profitable through the 1940s. Many distinctive houses in the community are a reminder of the fortunes that were made during this period.

The Western Hospital was constructed in 1945 and was the first hospital built west of Summerside. The public library opened in 1951, followed by the federal government building in 1962 and the Jacques Cartier Arena and a community museum in 1964. The original Maplewood Manor nursing home operated from 1967 to 2011, and was replaced by the new Maplewood Manor nursing home, in the autumn of 2011.

== Geography ==
Alberton is roughly halfway between Tignish and O'Leary, and is situated along the north shore of the island, fronting the open Gulf of St. Lawrence. It has a land area of approximately 5 square kilometres (1.9 sq mi).

- 90 km : Confederation Bridge (to New Brunswick)
- 120 km : Charlottetown
- 66 km : Summerside
- 176 km : Wood Islands ferry (to Nova Scotia)

=== Climate ===
Alberton experiences a humid continental climate (Köppen Dfb) similar to that of coastal Hokkaido, being somewhat less extreme due to the island condition and being surrounded by the Gulf of St Lawrence. The amount of rain recorded on a single day was 102 mm on 5 August 1989 and the daily record of snowfall was 56.1 cm on 15 December 2003. Although the odors associated with fishing and shipping, according to one 2008 report air quality agrees the criteria of regulatory projects of the same.

Climate data for Alberton (Kildare), elevation: 3 m or 9.8 ft, 1981–2010 normals, extremes 1969-present
| Month | Jan | Feb | Mar | Apr | May | Jun | Jul | Aug | Sep | Oct | Nov | Dec | Year |
|---|---|---|---|---|---|---|---|---|---|---|---|---|---|
| Record high °C (°F) | 13.2 (55.8) | 14.5 (58.1) | 15.6 (60.1) | 22.5 (72.5) | 32.8 (91.0) | 33.2 (91.8) | 33.0 (91.4) | 33.3 (91.9) | 33.2 (91.8) | 25.5 (77.9) | 21.0 (69.8) | 14.0 (57.2) | 33.3 (91.9) |
| Mean daily maximum °C (°F) | −3.9 (25.0) | −3.2 (26.2) | 0.7 (33.3) | 6.1 (43.0) | 13.3 (55.9) | 19.1 (66.4) | 23.2 (73.8) | 23.1 (73.6) | 18.7 (65.7) | 12.2 (54.0) | 5.7 (42.3) | -0.0 (32.0) | 9.6 (49.3) |
| Daily mean °C (°F) | −8.2 (17.2) | −7.7 (18.1) | −3.3 (26.1) | 2.4 (36.3) | 8.7 (47.7) | 14.5 (58.1) | 18.7 (65.7) | 18.6 (65.5) | 14.4 (57.9) | 8.4 (47.1) | 2.6 (36.7) | −3.5 (25.7) | 5.5 (41.9) |
| Mean daily minimum °C (°F) | −12.5 (9.5) | −12.1 (10.2) | −7.3 (18.9) | −1.4 (29.5) | 4.1 (39.4) | 9.8 (49.6) | 14.1 (57.4) | 14.0 (57.2) | 10.0 (50.0) | 4.4 (39.9) | −0.5 (31.1) | −7.0 (19.4) | 1.3 (34.3) |
| Record low °C (°F) | −31.7 (−25.1) | −33.0 (−27.4) | −26.0 (−14.8) | −15.0 (5.0) | −7.2 (19.0) | −1.7 (28.9) | 3.0 (37.4) | 1.5 (34.7) | −3.3 (26.1) | −6.7 (19.9) | −16.7 (1.9) | −26.1 (−15.0) | −33.0 (−27.4) |
| Average precipitation mm (inches) | 96.4 (3.80) | 74.5 (2.93) | 80.9 (3.19) | 80.1 (3.15) | 92.7 (3.65) | 82.1 (3.23) | 86.3 (3.40) | 79.7 (3.14) | 91.6 (3.61) | 96.1 (3.78) | 99.1 (3.90) | 93.7 (3.69) | 1,053.1 (41.46) |
| Average rainfall mm (inches) | 22.8 (0.90) | 18.4 (0.72) | 32.6 (1.28) | 58.3 (2.30) | 90.8 (3.57) | 82.1 (3.23) | 86.3 (3.40) | 79.7 (3.14) | 91.6 (3.61) | 96.1 (3.78) | 84.3 (3.32) | 42.9 (1.69) | 785.9 (30.94) |
| Average snowfall cm (inches) | 73.6 (29.0) | 56.0 (22.0) | 48.3 (19.0) | 21.8 (8.6) | 1.8 (0.7) | 0.0 (0.0) | 0.0 (0.0) | 0.0 (0.0) | 0.0 (0.0) | 0.1 (0.0) | 14.8 (5.8) | 50.8 (20.0) | 267.2 (105.1) |
| Average precipitation days (≥ 0.2 mm) | 12.8 | 10.2 | 11.5 | 12.7 | 13.3 | 11.9 | 11.2 | 11.4 | 11.3 | 12.6 | 14.5 | 14.0 | 147.4 |
| Average snowy days (≥ 0.2 mm) | 10.6 | 8.2 | 7.7 | 3.7 | 0.36 | 0 | 0 | 0 | 0 | 0.08 | 3.3 | 9.2 | 43.14 |
Source: Environment Canada

== Demographics ==
Federal census population history of Alberton
| Year | Pop. | ±% |
|---|---|---|
| 1921 | 625 | — |
| 1931 | 590 | −5.6% |
| 1941 | 554 | −6.1% |
| 1951 | 674 | +21.7% |
| 1956 | 820 | +21.7% |
| 1961 | 855 | +4.3% |
| 1966 | 796 | −6.9% |
| 1971 | 973 | +22.2% |
| 1976 | 1,062 | +9.1% |
| 1981 | 1,020 | −4.0% |
| 1986 | 1,103 | +8.1% |
| 1991 | 1,068 | −3.2% |
| 1996 | 1,084 | +1.5% |
| 2001 | 1,115 | +2.9% |
| 2006 | 1,081 | −3.0% |
| 2011 | 1,135 | +5.0% |
| 2016 | 1,145 | +0.9% |
| 2021 | 1,301 | +13.6% |
Source: Statistics Canada

In the 2021 Census of Population conducted by Statistics Canada, Alberton had a population of 1,301 living in 558 of its 595 total private dwellings, a change of 13.6% from its 2016 population of 1,145. With a land area of 4.7 km^{2} (1.8 sq mi), it had a population density of 276.8/km^{2} (716.9/sq mi) in 2021.

== Economy ==
The majority of the Alberton work force is employed in the service sector, serving a surrounding population of 5000 residents in western Prince County.

=== Fishing ===
The fishing industry in the adjacent community of Northport is a significant economic activity, with landings by fishing boats totalling 3 million kilograms of species such as American lobster, mussels, snow crab, soft-shell clams, cod, herring, American plaice, mackerel, sea scallop, yellowtail, eel, winter flounder, smelt, rock crab, tomcod, silversides, porbeagle, and blue shark. Source: 1996, DFO

=== Agriculture ===
The agriculture industry in areas surrounding Alberton is dominated by farmers growing potatoes that are used for table stock, French fries, potato chips or cooking, although a significant number of seed growers are in the area as well.

== Education ==
In 2011 Holland College West Prince Campus opened the doors in a new facility located in the centre of Alberton. The town has private day care and publicly funded kindergarten facilities, as well as Alberton Elementary School (gr. 1–6, 234 students). Students are also transported by bus to the more centrally located Merritt E. Callaghan Intermediate School (gr. 7–9, 378 students) and Westisle Composite High School (gr. 10–12, 748 students), both being located in nearby communities.

== Infrastructure ==
=== Transportation ===
Alberton is located on Route 12, which is part of the North Cape Coastal Drive. The town is several kilometers northeast of Route 2, the main provincial east–west secondary highway. Alberton Harbor in Northport is administered by the small craft harbors division of the federal Department of Fisheries and Oceans.

=== Health care ===
Alberton is home to the Western Hospital which serves the area with 25 acute care beds and 2 palliative care beds. There is a pharmacy, and a 24-hour medical clinic located at the hospital. In addition, there is Maplewood Manor which is a long-term care facility, and the new Rev W.J. Phillips Residence which offers 25 units of enriched residential care.

== Amenities ==
The town is in close proximity to three provincial parks: Mill River Provincial Park, Bloomfield Provincial Park, and Jacques Cartier Provincial Park. It is also located on the Confederation Trail for walking, running and bicycling in the summer.

The area offers opportunities for recreational fishing at Gallant's Pond, Arsenault's Pond, Blanchard's Pond, Gordon's Pond, Warren's Pond, Black Pond, Leard's Pond, MacAusland's Pond, Livingstone's Pond, Mill River Bridge, Cain's Brook, Miminegash River, Little Tignish River, the Old Dam Site on the Mill River, the Trout River, and the Little and Big Pierre Jacques Rivers. Atlantic Salmon can also be fished (using a fly) in Leard's Pond and Trout River after the middle of June.

Historic Sites

The Alberton Court House was designated a National Historic Site of Canada in 1981. It has housed the Alberton Museum since 1980 and contains various displays from its collection pertaining to the area.

The town park contains a monument to the pioneers of silver fox farming, Robert Oulton and Charles Dalton.

Facilities

Facilities include:

- Holland College West Prince Campus
- Alberton Community Centre (bowling lanes, bingo,)
- Alberton Elementary School
- Alberton Library
- Iron Haven Gym
- Jacques Cartier Memorial Arena
- Maplewood Manor
- Stone Station Park
- Prince County Exhibition Grounds
- Town Community Room
- Veterans Memorial Park
- Western Community Curling Club
- soccer field
- two baseball diamonds

Events

- The Prince County Exhibition is held every August and features livestock shows, exhibits, meals, racing, youth talent, strongman competition, and a midway.
- Other events include the Alberton Day Festival, Canada Day .

Churches

Alberton has seven churches:

- Alberton Baptist Church
- Alberton Presbyterian Church
- Apostolic Pentecostal
- Gordon Memorial United Church of Canada
- Kingdom Hall of Jehovah's Witness
- Sacred Heart Roman Catholic Church
- St. Peter's Anglican Church

== Media ==
The Journal Pioneer, a weekly newspaper published in Summerside, maintains its office for western Prince County in Alberton.

The West Prince Graphic is a weekly newspaper serving the western part of Prince County and is published locally.

A bi-weekly advertising paper called the Penny Saver is published and distributed to all the residents of Western PEI.

== Notable people ==
- Herbert Bell, politician
- Joe O'Brien, driver

== See also ==
- Royal eponyms in Canada
