= Leoville =

Leoville or Léoville may refer to:

- Léoville, commune in the Charente-Maritime département of France
- Leoville, Prince Edward Island, community in Tignish, Prince Edward Island, Canada
- Leoville, Saskatchewan, community in Saskatchewan, Canada
- Leoville, Kansas, an unincorporated community in Decatur County, Kansas, U.S.
- "Leoville", nickname and website name of technology writer Leo Laporte

== See also ==
- Château Léoville (disambiguation)
