= Château Léoville =

Château Léoville was an estate in Saint-Julien in the Bordeaux region of France that until the French Revolution formed a single property, since divided into three neighbouring wineries:

- Château Léoville Barton, in the central part of Saint-Julien along the Gironde river, formed in 1826
- Château Léoville-Las Cases, on the northern boundary of Saint-Julien, formed in 1826 and divided in 1840
- Château Léoville-Poyferré, split off from the other wineries in 1840

== See also ==
- Leoville (disambiguation)
