= Seacow Pond, Prince Edward Island =

Coordinates: 47.030°N 63.998°W

Location of Seacow Pond in Prince Edward Island

Seacow Pond is an unincorporated settlement in Lot 1 on Prince Edward Island.

== History ==
Seacow Pond got its name from the vast herds of walrus (nicknamed “sea cows”) that once frequented the area. These animals were abundant in the late 1700s and early 19th century and are memorialized today in local place names like Seacow Pond and Seacow Head.

In the winter of 1770 Scottish settlers near Tignish faced starvation. Indigenous guides led them to Seacow Pond where they found a pond full of wintering walruses. That discovery (and subsequent harvesting) provided vital sustenance and helped them survive. Throughout the next century, local communities continued to harvest walrus until the 1880s. After which the region transitioned toward fishing and agriculture. Many of the families who settled then remain in the area today.

Another historical landmark is the Seacow Head Lighthouse which was built in 1864. It's one of the oldest wooden lighthouses in the Maritimes. To prevent erosion it was relocated inland in 1979. A replica that was designed to resemble The Seacow Head Lighthouse on Prince Edward Island, appeared in several episodes of the television series Road to Avonlea. The original has since been designated a federal heritage lighthouse and protected historic place.
