= Harper, Prince Edward Island =

Canadian rural community

Coordinates: 46°56′10.9″N 64°4′53.6″W

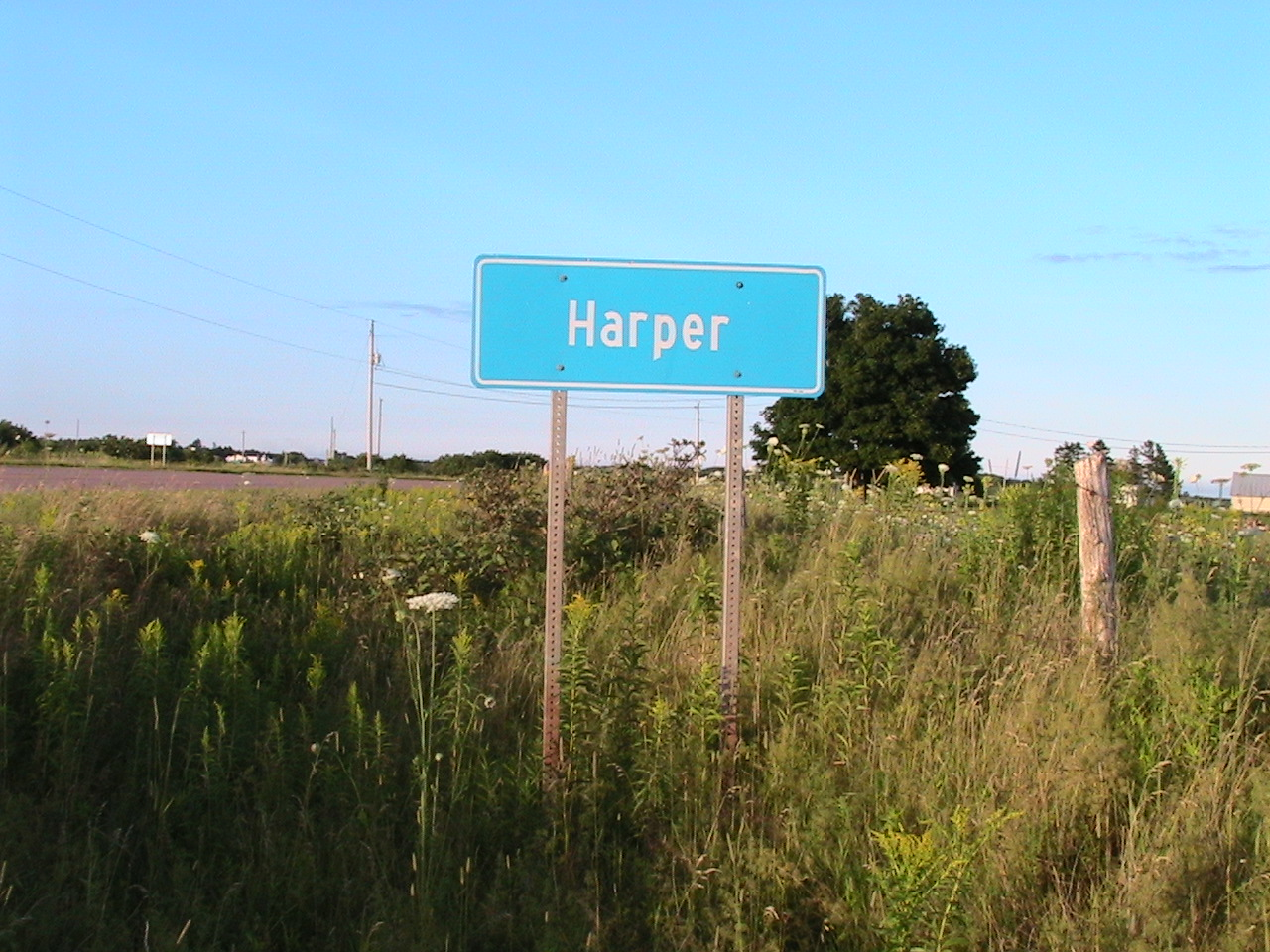
Sign for the community of Harper

Harper (sometimes referred to collectively as Harper Road) is a Canadian rural community located in western Prince County, Prince Edward Island.

Among other roads, Harper is located on Route 158, which runs from Route 2 (Tignish) to Route 156 (Palmer Road).

The second community on Route 158 is Leoville, which continues to officially exist, although a 1998 civic address reform in Prince Edward Island saw all Leoville addresses consolidated under Harper. Many locals refer to Harper and Leoville as "Harper Road" collectively.

Harper is home to Harper's Brook, a tributary to the Tignish River, which runs from Tignish to DeBlois. Harper has a population of approximately 200 residents and traces its name to the explorer William Harper, who inhabited the area during the 19th century. Harper (Settlement) was adopted in the Place Names of Prince Edward Island in 1925 and was changed to Harpers (Settlement) on December 3, 1946, then to Harper (Station) on May 5, 1960. It was changed to its present status as Harper (Locality) on October 23, 1989.

== List of roads in Harper ==
- Harper Rd - Route 158
- Gunion Rd
- Spruce Ln
- Pinetree Ln
- Western Rd - Route 2
- Phillip St
- Joe Pete Rd
- Peter Rd - Route 159
