= Herbert Bell =

Canadian politician (1818–1876)

Herbert Bell (30 November 1818 – 15 February 1876) was born in Scotland and immigrated to Canada in the 1840s, settling at Alberton, Prince Edward Island.

Bell was actively involved in a number of pursuits after arriving in Prince County. He was a farmer, merchant, and shipbuilder at this location. Later, when firmly established economically, he entered politics. He eventually became president of the Legislative Council of Prince Edward Island, the upper house of the General Assembly, and held that position until his death.
