= Leoville, Prince Edward Island =

Coordinates: 46°55′12.3″N 64°8′12.9″W

Leoville (sometimes known collectively as Harper Road) is a Canadian rural community located on Route 158, 3.50–5.00 miles SW of Tignish in western Prince County, Prince Edward Island.

Adjacent to Harper and southwest of the village of Tignish, the community is named after Pope Leo XIII. It was created on December 3, 1946, as a means of separating the northern and southern end of Harper Road into different school districts. a section of North Cape Coastal Drive, a popular Prince Edward's Island tourist attraction, runs through Leoville.

Leoville is located in the federal district of Egmont, which is represented in the House of Commons by Robert J. Morrissey.

== See also ==
- Route 159
- Route 160
- St. Simon & St. Jude Church (Tignish)
- Palmer Road
