= St. Felix, Prince Edward Island =

St. Felix
- Rural municipality
- St. Felix in Prince Edward Island
- Coordinates: 46.935°N 64.027°W
- Country: Canada
- Province: Prince Edward Island
- County: Prince County
- Time zone: AST
  - Summer (DST): ADT
- Area code: 902

St. Felix (population: 250) is a rural municipality in Prince Edward Island, Canada. It is located in Prince County, 4 km (2.5 mi) south of Tignish.

The Tignish River (also known as Harper's Brook) begins in the community and runs to Deblois.

The community's name is derived from Pope Felix I.

== Communities ==
- Tignish
- Greenmount
- Tignish Shore
- Central Kildare
- St. Roch

== Demographics ==
Federal census population history of St. Felix
Year	Pop.	±%
2016	325	—
2021	314	−3.4%
Source: Statistics Canada

In the 2021 Census of Population conducted by Statistics Canada, St. Felix had a population of 314 living in 127 of its 134 total private dwellings, a change of −3.4% from its 2016 population of 325. With a land area of 11.54 km^{2} (4.46 sq mi), it had a population density of 27.2/km^{2} (70.5/sq mi) in 2021.
