= Jacques Cartier Provincial Park =

Park in Prince Edward Island, Canada

Coordinates: 46°51′4.4″N 64°0′46.8″W

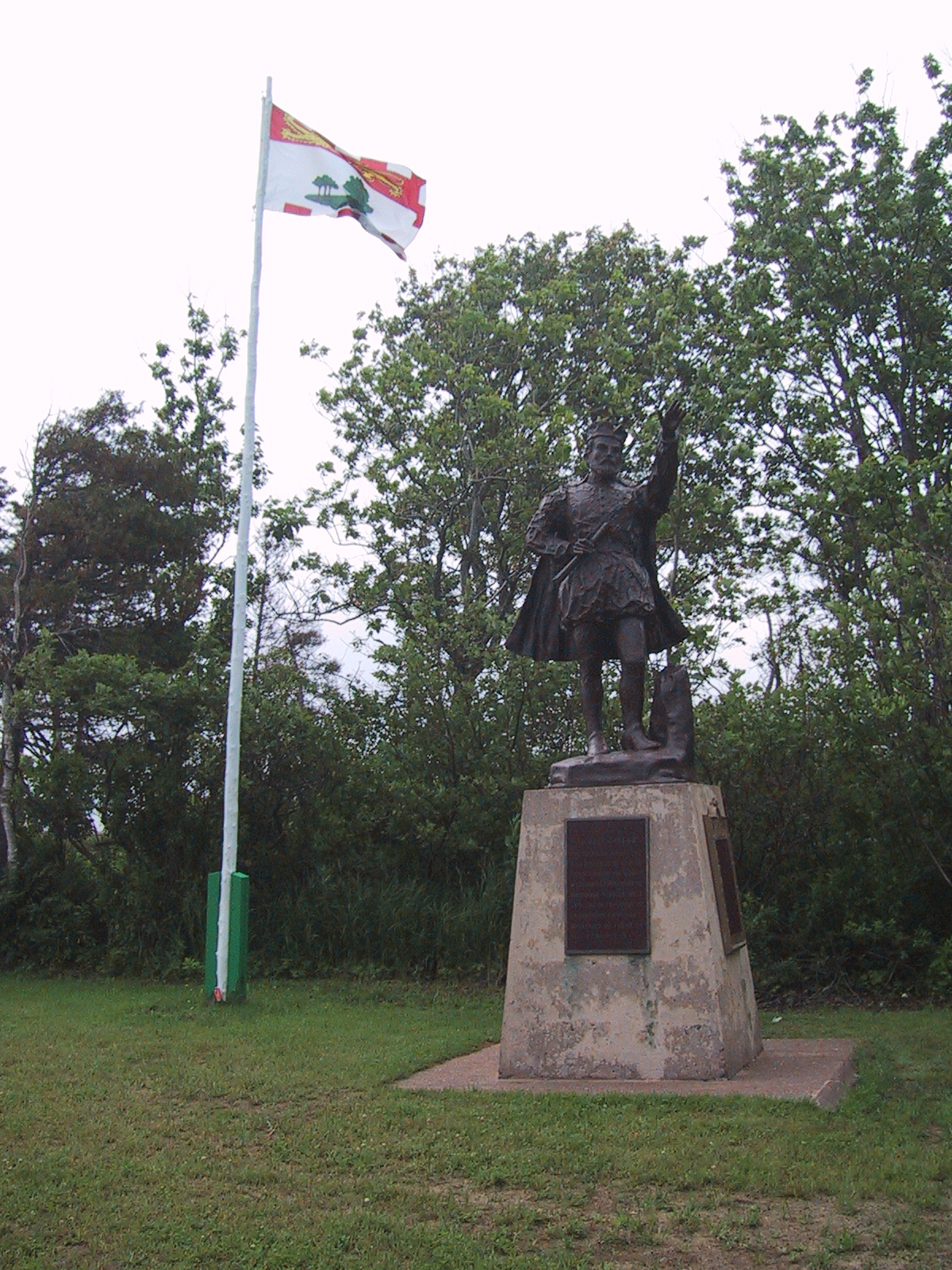
Statue of Jacques Cartier in the Jacques Cartier Provincial Park.

Jacques Cartier Provincial Park is a provincial park in northwestern Prince Edward Island, Canada, approximately 6 km northeast of Alberton. The park is named for Jacques Cartier, who in 1534 was the first European to arrive on the island. This is celebrated each year in July on Rediscovery Day.
