= Mill River Provincial Park =

Former public park in Prince Edward Island, Canada

Coordinates: 46°44′42.2″N 64°7′15.1″W

Mill River Provincial Park was a provincial park in Prince Edward Island, Canada. It is now owned and operated by Don MacDougall along with the Mill River resort and golf course.
