= Peterville, Prince Edward Island =

Coordinates: 46°56′19″N 64°6′1″W

Peterville (also known as Peter Road) is a small community located on Route 159 from 2.01 – 3.78 miles SW of Tignish, in the Lot 1 township. Peterville is within the Canadian province of Prince Edward Island, in Eastern Canada. The community is home to Harper's Brook, a tributary to the Tignish River, which runs from Tignish to DeBlois. It is home to approximately 20 people. The name "Peterville" is believed to have come from an explorer, Peters, who visited the area in the 18th century or later.
