= Coleman, Prince Edward Island =

Community in Prince Edward Island, Canada

Coordinates: 46°41′0″N 64°10′0″W

Coleman is a Canadian rural community in Prince County, Prince Edward Island.

It is located southeast of O'Leary.
