= Bloomfield Provincial Park =

Park in Prince Edward Island, Canada

Coordinates: 46°44′42.61″N 64°10′43.05″W

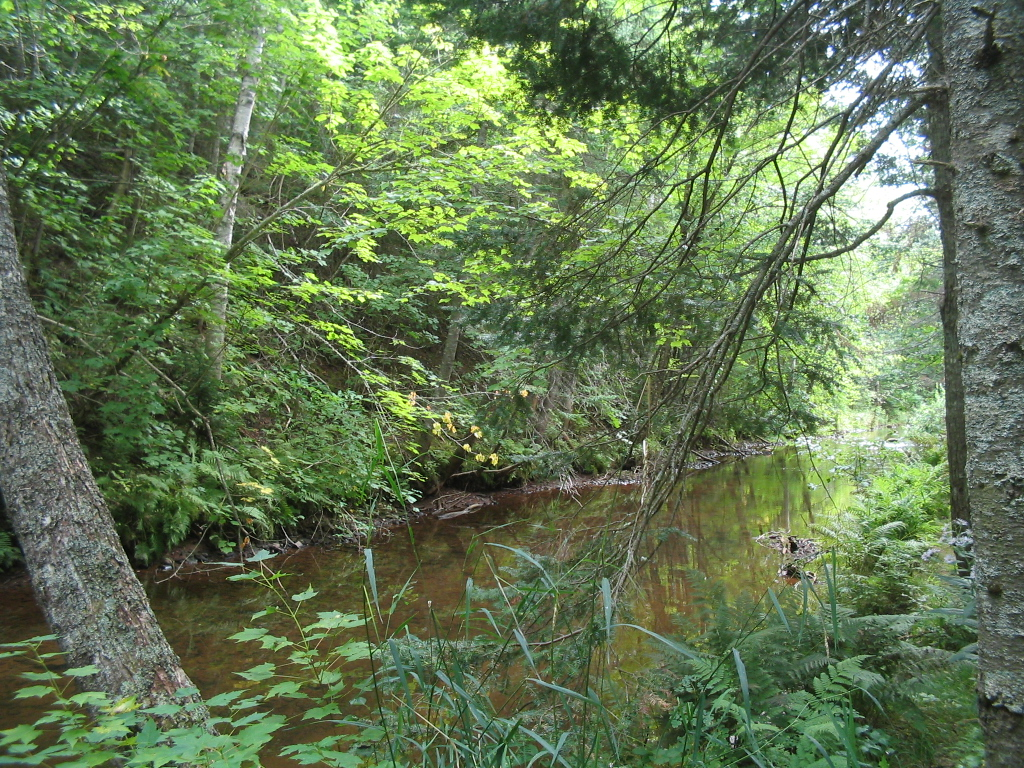
- Interactive map of Bloomfield Provincial Park
- Location: Prince County, Prince Edward Island
- Area: 4.69 ha (11.6 acres)
- Established: 1960

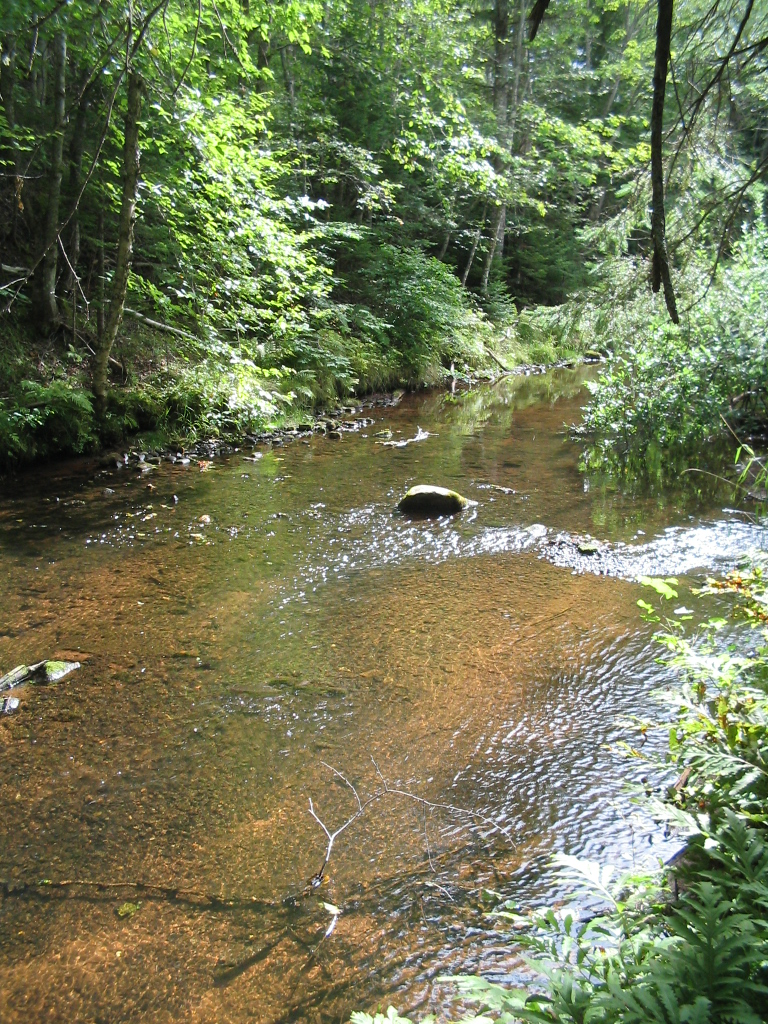
A river coursing through Bloomfield Provincial Park

Bloomfield Provincial Park is a provincial park and conservation area in Prince County, Canada. It opened in 1960.
