= Judes Point, Prince Edward Island =

Locality in Prince Edward Island, Canada

Coordinates: 46.950°N 64.015°W

Location of Judes Point in Prince Edward Island

Judes Point is a locality in the Canadian province of Prince Edward Island, located in Prince County. It is situated approximately 3 km east of Tignish.
