= Ebbsfleet, Prince Edward Island =

Human settlement in Prince Edward Island, Canada

Coordinates: 46.896°N 64.222°W

Location of Ebbsfleet in Prince Edward Island

Ebbsfleet is a settlement in the Canadian province of Prince Edward Island.
