= D. Kildare =

American poet

Delores Ann Kildare (1934–2005) was an American poet known by the pen name D. Kildare. Born in Iowa, she grew up in Los Angeles. She married Joseph Malof in 1957 and had three children: Andrew, Jessica, and Peter. She moved to Austin, Texas in 1961 and lived on the shore of Lake Travis. Her poems were published in numerous journals and quarterlies, and her one volume of poems was published posthumously as Hungry Ghosts and Other Poems (Llumina Press, 2006), the back cover of which says that "D. Kildare's poems take us to the edge between things and nothing, where language both secures us and imprisons us." They reflect her travels and readings in history. She died in June 2005.
