= Anglo Tignish, Prince Edward Island =

Locality in Prince Edward Island, Canada

Coordinates: 46.975°N 63.994°W

Location of Anglo Tignish in Prince Edward Island

Anglo Tignish is a locality in the Canadian province of Prince Edward Island.
