= Central Kildare, Prince Edward Island =

Locality in Prince Edward Island, Canada

Coordinates: 46.872°N 64.005°W

Location of Central Kildare in Prince Edward Island

Central Kildare is a locality in the Canadian province of Prince Edward Island. It is located a few kilometres north of Alberton, Prince Edward Island.
