= List of parishes in Prince Edward Island =

This is a list of parishes for the Canadian province of Prince Edward Island.

== Prince County ==
- North Parish
- Egmont Parish
- Halifax Parish
- Richmond Parish
- St. David's Parish

== Queens County ==
- Grenville Parish
- Hillsboro Parish
- Charlotte Parish
- Bedford Parish
- St. John's Parish

== Kings County ==
- St. Patrick's Parish
- East Parish
- St. George's Parish
- St. Andrew's Parish
