= Norway, Prince Edward Island =

Settlement in Canada

Coordinates: 46.995°N 64.036°W

Location of Norway in Prince Edward Island

Norway is a settlement in Prince Edward Island.
