= Woodvale, Prince Edward Island =

Human settlement in Prince Edward Island, Canada

Coordinates: 46.884°N 64.084°W

Location of Woodvale in Prince Edward Island

Woodvale is a settlement in Prince Edward Island, Canada.
