= Prince Edward Island Route 158 =

Highway in Prince Edward Island, Canada

Route 158

Route information
- Maintained by Prince Edward Island Department of Transportation and Infrastructure Renewal

Major junctions
- From: Route 156
- To: Route 2

Location
- Country: Canada
- Province: Prince Edward Island

Highway system
- Provincial highways in Prince Edward Island

Route 158, officially named Harper Road, and sometimes referred to sectionally as Leoville Road ^{(see below)}, is a 2-lane collector highway in western Prince County, Prince Edward Island, Canada. It is located 0–4 miles SW of the community of Tignish. Its maximum speed limit is 80 km/h (50 mph).

The highway runs from Route 156 (Palmer Road) to Route 2 (Tignish), the Veteran's Memorial Highway, passing through the communities of Tignish, Harper, Leoville, and Palmer Road.

The highway is grossly considered as part of the Tignish district, though some may consider southern portions of the highway to be part of the St. Louis–Miminegash region.

== Naming issues ==
Though the entire highway runs straight from Route 156 (Palmer Road) to Route 2 (Western Road) without any interruptions, the highway is sometimes considered by local residents to be two "separate roads" because of traditional naming and zoning. Since the highway contains the two separate communities of Harper and Leoville, but is entirely officially known as Harper Road, some locals avoid naming the Leoville portion of the highway as being on "Harper Road" because Leoville is seen as distinct from Harper (or Harper Road). Some will thus sometimes (inaccurately) label the Leoville portion of Route 158 as Leoville Road.

== Other information ==
Harper Road is a secondary highway in Prince Edward Island, and is one of the busiest secondary highways in the Tignish area. In terms of emergency services, Tignish Fire Department services civic house numbers 1 through 1100 on Harper Road, which is from the Western Road intersection south to the Provost Road intersection. Civic addresses south of there (house numbers 1101–1550) are part of Miminegash Fire Department.

=== List of roads merging from Route 158 ===
- Western Rd – Route 2 (Harper)
- Phillip St (Tignish)
- Gunion Rd (Harper)
- Peter Rd – Route 159 (Peterville)
- Joe Pete Rd (Leoville)
- Provost Rd (Leoville)
- Spruce Ln (Harper)
- Pinetree Ln (Harper)
- Palmer Rd – Route 156 (Palmer Road)
- Andrews Ln (Harper)
