= St. Lawrence, Prince Edward Island =

Coordinates: 46.847°N 64.203°W

Location of St. Lawrence in Prince Edward Island

St. Lawrence is a settlement in Prince Edward Island.
