= St. Roch, Prince Edward Island =

Unincorporated settlement in Canada

Coordinates: 46.914°N 64.045°W

Location of St. Roch in Prince Edward Island

St. Roch is an unincorporated settlement in Lot 1 township on Prince Edward Island, Canada.
