= Tignish Shore =

- Rural municipality
- Tignish Shore in Prince Edward Island
- Coordinates: 46.946°N 63.994°W
- Country: Canada
- Province: Prince Edward Island
- County: Prince County
- Lot: 1

Population
  - Total: 57
- Time zone: AST
  - Summer (DST): ADT
- Area code: 902
- Telephone Exchange: 775 806 882

Tignish Shore (population: 57) is a rural municipality in Prince Edward Island, Canada. It is located in the Lot 1 township.

== Demographics ==
Federal census population history of Tignish Shore
| Year | Pop. | ±% |
|---|---|---|
| 2016 | 63 | — |
| 2021 | 64 | +1.6% |
Source: Statistics Canada

In the 2021 Census of Population conducted by Statistics Canada, Tignish Shore had a population of 64 living in 28 of its 45 total private dwellings, a change of 1.6% from its 2016 population of 63. With a land area of 1.65 km^{2} (0.64 sq mi), it had a population density of 38.8/km^{2} (100.5/sq mi) in 2021.
