= Montrose, Prince Edward Island =

Locality in Prince Edward Island, Canada

Coordinates: 46.868°N 64.065°W

Location of Montrose in Prince Edward Island

Montrose is a locality in the Canadian province of Prince Edward Island.
