= North Parish, Prince Edward Island =

Coordinates: 46°56′58.4″N 64°2′49″W

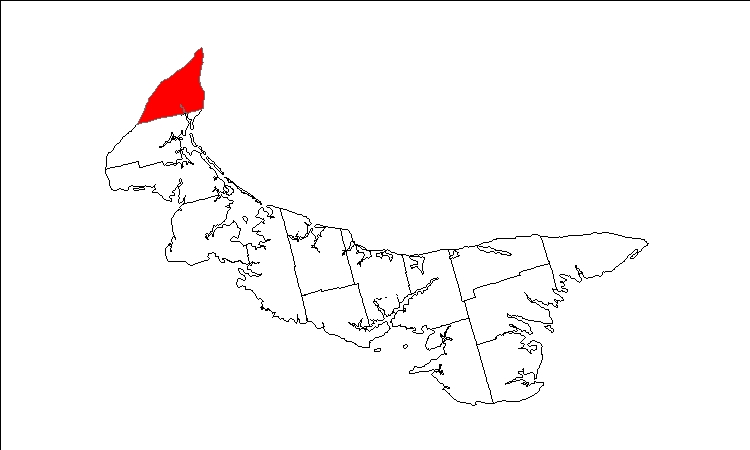

North Parish was created as a civil parish in Prince County, Prince Edward Island, Canada, during the 1764–1766 survey of Samuel Holland.

It contains the following townships:

- Lot 1
- Lot 2
- Lot 3
