= St. Louis, Prince Edward Island =

St. Louis
- Community
- Location of St. Louis in Prince Edward Island
- Coordinates: 46.88604°N 64.14432°W
- Country: Canada
- Province: Prince Edward Island
- County: Prince County
- Parish: Egmont
- Township: Lot 5
- Incorporated: 1964

Government
  - Council: Community of St. Louis Council
  - Chairperson: Everett "Sonny" Wedge

Area
  - Total: 0.62 km^{2} (0.24 sq mi)
- Elevation: 40 m (130 ft)

Population (2016)
  - Total: 83
  - Density: 130/km^{2} (350/sq mi)
- Time zone: UTC-4 (AST)
  - Summer (DST): UTC-3 (ADT)
- Postal Code: C0B 1Z0
- Area code: 902
- Telephone Exchange: 775 806 882

St. Louis is a municipality that holds community status in Prince Edward Island, Canada.

It is located in western Prince County, west of the junction of Route 155 and Route 152, 150 kilometres (93 mi) from Charlottetown, the provincial capital.

The community lies in the Egmont federal electoral district, and in the Tignish-Palmer Road and Alberton-Roseville provincial electoral districts.

== Demographics ==
Federal census population history of St. Louis
Year	Pop.	±%
1966	140	—
1971	166	+18.6%
1976	143	−13.9%
1981	156	+9.1%
1986	135	−13.5%
1991	124	−8.1%
1996	100	−19.4%
2001	98	−2.0%
2006	80	−18.4%
2011	51	−36.3%
2016	66	+29.4%
2021	69	+4.5%
Source: Statistics Canada

In the 2021 Census of Population conducted by Statistics Canada, St. Louis had a population of 69 living in 33 of its 35 total private dwellings, a change of 4.5% from its 2016 population of 66. With a land area of 0.68 km^{2} (0.26 sq mi), it had a population density of 101.5/km^{2} (262.8/sq mi) in 2021.

== Education ==
St. Louis Elementary is the only school in the community. It is administered by the English Language School Board of Prince Edward Island. It offers English or French Immersion classes for students from St. Louis and other communities such as St.Edward, Miminegash, Pleasant View, Waterford, Palmer Road and DeBlois. It was the first school to offer French Immersion in the province.

== See also ==
- List of communities in Prince Edward Island
