= St. Peter and St. Paul, Prince Edward Island =

Human settlement in Prince Edward Island, Canada

Coordinates: 46.920°N 64.068°W

Location of St. Peter and St. Paul in Prince Edward Island

St. Peter and St. Paul is a settlement on Prince Edward Island. It is located in Prince County in the western part of the island. The name was adopted on 5 December 1966.
