= Kildare Capes, Prince Edward Island =

Coordinates: 46.910°N 63.984°W

Location of Kildare Capes in Prince Edward Island

Kildare Capes (Not to be confused with Cape Kildare) is a settlement on Prince Edward Island, located within Canada's Prince County. Its earliest mapping is in the 1897 Map of Maritime Provinces of Canada.
