= Nail Pond, Prince Edward Island =

Canadian rural community

Coordinates: 46°58′56.2″N 64°4′1.5″W

Location of Nail Pond in Prince Edward Island

Nail Pond (2006 population: ~250) is a Canadian rural community in Prince County, Prince Edward Island.

It is located north of Tignish, near the communities of Skinner's Pond, Ascension, and Peterville.

== History ==
It was founded by a cattle farmer by the name of Glenn Joseph Ellsworth in the early 19th century, and was reformed as an official locality in 2000. Ellsworth, discovered Nail Pond while making his way north from Tignish. He then settled there with his wife and several family members from England who emigrated to the area.

In November 2024, a Blue whale washed ashore on Nail Pond beach. The whale was buried, but disinterred in 2008. The skeleton of the whale was sent to the University of British Columbia, where it is now on display.

== Roads in Nail Pond locality ==
- Route 160 (Ascension Road)
- Back Settlement Road
- Josie Shang Road
- Nail Pond Shore Road
- Route 156 (Palmer Road)
- Pebble Beach Avenue
- Route 14
- Sunset Beach Road

== See also ==
- PEI Government website
