= Skinners Pond, Prince Edward Island =

Locality in Prince Edward Island, Canada

Coordinates: 46°58′N 64°08′W

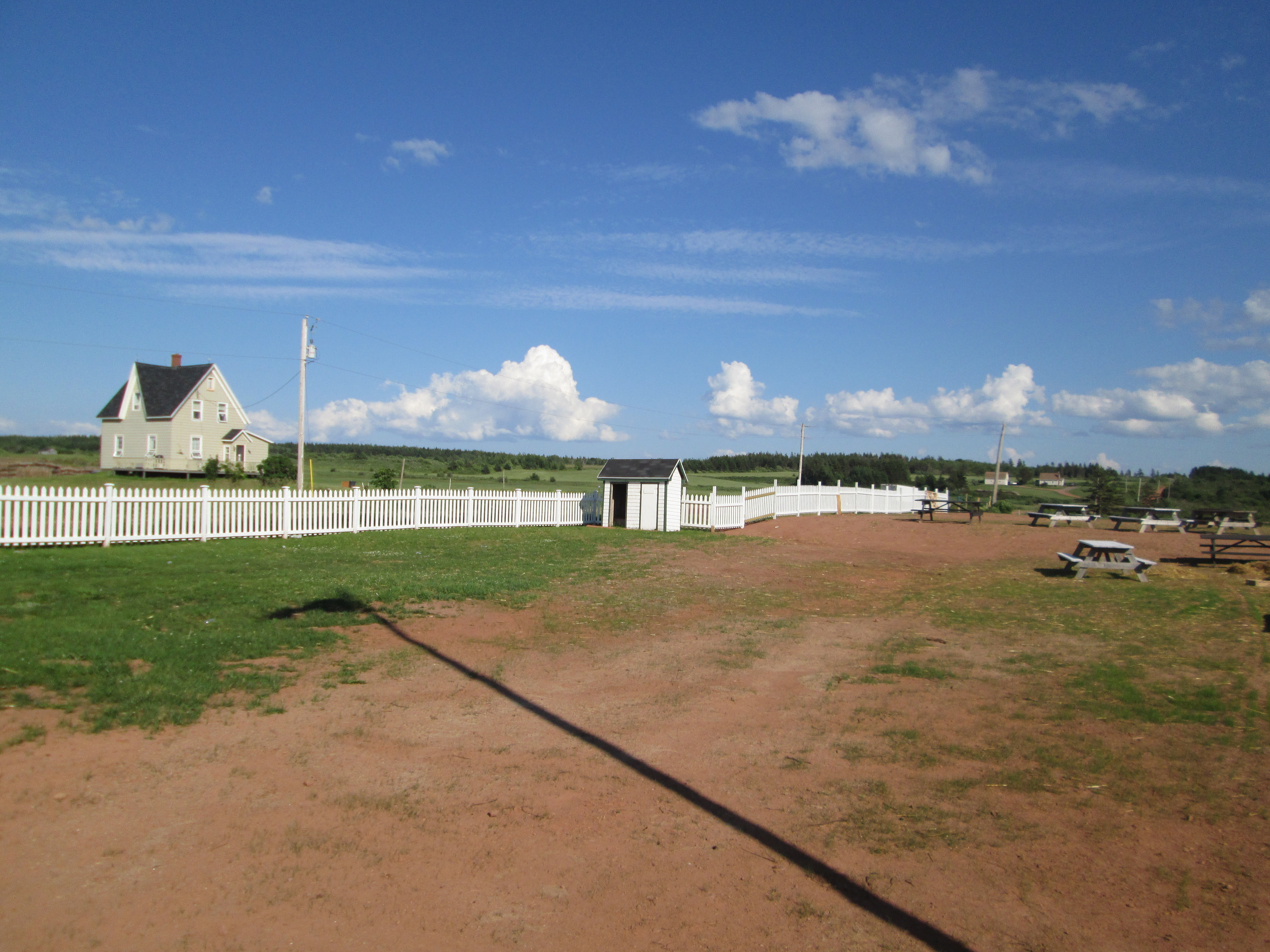
Skinners Pond, July 2017

Skinners Pond is a rural locality in Prince County, Prince Edward Island, Canada.

It is located northwest of the town of Tignish in the township of Lot 1, near the northwestern tip of the province. The primary industries for the area are agriculture and fishing.

Skinners Pond traces its name to a small lake of the same name. Originally the settlement was called Skinner Pond, however it was changed to Skinners Pond in 1966; note that there is no apostrophe in the name.

The exact population of Skinners Pond is unavailable as its population is amalgamated under the township of Lot 1 (2001 pop. 1,900).

Skinners Pond is probably best known as the boyhood home of Canadian musician Stompin' Tom Connors, who was adopted and raised by a family on a local farm.

The 2021 mystery film A Small Fortune is set in Skinners Pond.
