= Ascension, Prince Edward Island =

Community in Prince Edward Island, Canada

Coordinates: 46°57′45.1″N 64°4′12″W

Location of Ascension in Prince Edward Island

Ascension (also known as Pigbrook) is a small community located mainly on Route 160 from 3 miles NE of Tignish. Ascension is within the Canadian province of Prince Edward Island, in Eastern Canada.

The community is home to Harper's Brook, a tributary to the Tignish River, which runs from Tignish to DeBlois. It is home to approximately 130 people.

The name "Ascension" is believed to have come from the Christian doctrine account of the Ascension of Jesus after his death. The name may also be derived from the fact that the Ascension road ascends, from its starting point at Tignish to its finish in Nail Pond.
