= Miminegash =

- Rural municipality
- Miminegash in Prince Edward Island
- Coordinates: 46.880°N 64.229°W
- Country: Canada
- Province: Prince Edward Island
- County: Prince County

Government
  - Mayor: Audrey Callaghan
- Time zone: AST
  - Summer (DST): ADT
- Area code: 902

Miminegash is a rural municipality in Prince Edward Island, Canada. It is located 8 miles (13 km) northwest of Alberton and 11 miles (18 km) southwest of Tignish. It is part of a small area in Lot 3 known as either the St. Louis, Palmer Road, or Miminegash area. This area is often associated with Tignish due to the shared Acadian roots between these areas.

== Demographics ==
Federal census population history of Miminegash
Year	Pop.	±%
1971	417	—
1976	329	−21.1%
1981	304	−7.6%
1986	288	−5.3%
1991	249	−13.5%
1996	210	−15.7%
2001	188	−10.5%
2006	176	−6.4%
2011	173	−1.7%
2016	148	−14.5%
2021	148	+0.0%
Source: Statistics Canada

In the 2021 Census of Population conducted by Statistics Canada, Miminegash had a population of 148 living in 66 of its 74 total private dwellings, a change of 0% from its 2016 population of 148. With a land area of 1.88 km^{2} (0.73 sq mi), it had a population density of 78.7/km^{2} (203.9/sq mi) in 2021.

== Community ==
Miminegash is within 5 miles (8.0 km) of the following communities, known collectively as the St. Louis–Miminegash area. The area was a major source and processing center for Irish Moss harvested locally from the sea. Once processed into carrageenan, it is used as an emulsifier or a source of gloss for things such as ice cream, chocolate milk or lipstick.

- St. Louis
- Palmer Road
- Pleasant View
- Roseville
- St. Lawrence
- Waterford
- Skinner's Pond
- Palmer Road north
- DeBlois
- St. Edward
