= Pleasant View, Prince Edward Island =

Human settlement in Prince Edward Island, Canada

Coordinates: 46.915°N 64.201°W

Location of Pleasant View in Prince Edward Island

Pleasant View is an unincorporated settlement in Lot 1 township on Prince Edward Island.
