= Palmer Road, Prince Edward Island =

Coordinates: 46.912°N 64.157°W

Palmer Road is a small community located in Lot 1, in Prince County, Prince Edward Island, Canada that is located on Route 155, Route 156 and Route 158. There are approximately 100 citizens in Palmer Road, and it is located between Tignish and St. Louis, Prince Edward Island. It is also home to the Immaculate Conception Church, and the nearby Palmer Road Community Center. Palmer Road is located 2 mi (3.2 km) northwest of St. Louis, and 6 mi (9.7 km) southwest of Tignish.

== List of roads in Palmer Road ==
- Palmer Rd - Hwy 156
- DeBlois Rd - Hwy 157
- Hwy 158
- Thompson Rd - Hwy 155
- Church View Rd
- Provost Rd
- Knox Ln
