= Deblois, Prince Edward Island =

Coordinates: 46.913°N 64.107°W

Location of DeBlois in Prince Edward Island

DeBlois is a settlement in Prince Edward Island.

== See also ==
- List of communities in Prince Edward Island
