= Greenmount-Montrose =

- Rural municipality
- Greenmount-Montrose in Prince Edward Island
- Coordinates: 46.8995°N 64.041°W
- Country: Canada
- Province: Prince Edward Island
- County: Prince County

Population
  - Total: 262
- Time zone: AST
  - Summer (DST): ADT
- Area code: 902

Greenmount (population: 262) is a rural municipality in Prince Edward Island, Canada.

== Demographics ==
Federal census population history of Greenmount-Montrose
Year	Pop.	±%
2016	292	—
2021	262	−10.3%
Source: Statistics Canada

In the 2021 Census of Population conducted by Statistics Canada, Greenmount-Montrose had a population of 262 living in 102 of its 127 total private dwellings, a change of −10.3% from its 2016 population of 292. With a land area of 26.03 km^{2} (10.05 sq mi), it had a population density of 10.1/km^{2} (26.1/sq mi) in 2021.
