= Tignish =

- Town
- Town of Tignish
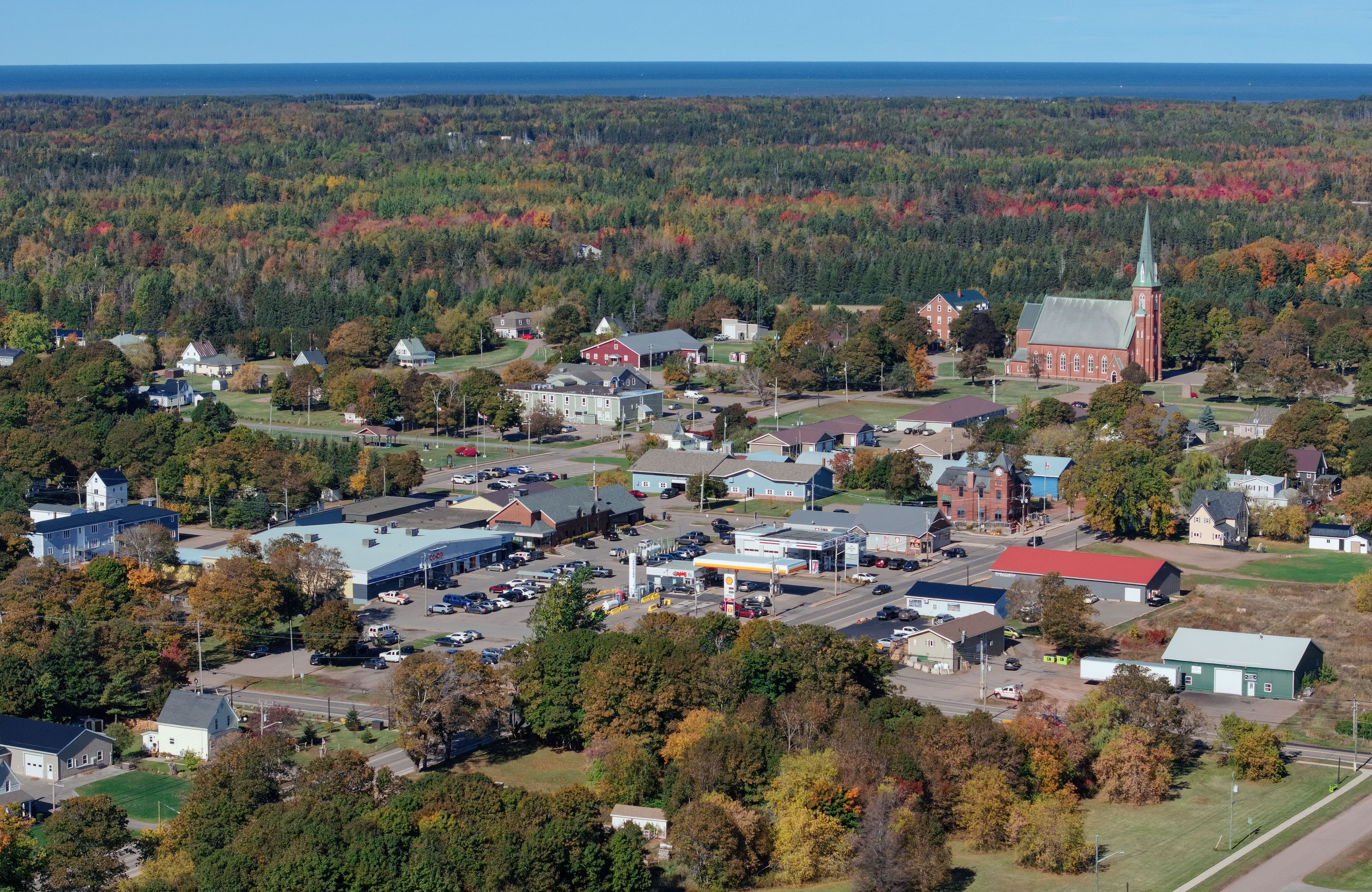
- Aerial view
- Motto: "Cherishing Our Heritage"
- Tignish in Prince Edward Island
- Coordinates: 46.95050°N 64.03356°W
- Country: Canada
- Province: Prince Edward Island
- County: Prince County
- Parish: North Parish
- Township: Lot 1
- Founded: 1799
- Village: 1952
- Town: 2017

Government
  - Type: Town council
  - Mayor: Allan McInnis

Area (2016)
  - Land: 5.87 km^{2} (2.27 sq mi)
- Elevation: 15 m (49 ft)

Population (2016)
  - Total: 719
  - Density: 122.5/km^{2} (317/sq mi)
- Time zone: UTC-4 (AST)
  - Summer (DST): UTC-3 (ADT)
- Canadian postal code: C0B 2B0
- Area code: 902
- Telephone Exchange: 775 806 882
- NTS Map: 21I16 Tignish
- GNBC Code: BAEGT
- Website: townoftignish.ca

Tignish is a Canadian town located in Prince County, Prince Edward Island.

It is located approximately 50 miles (80 km) northwest of the city of Summerside, and 90 miles (140 km) northwest of the city of Charlottetown. It has a population of 719. The name "Tignish" is derived from the Mi'kmaq "Mtagunich", meaning "paddle".

Tignish was founded in the late 1790s by nine francophone Acadian families, with further immigrants (mostly Irish) arriving in the 19th century and settling mostly in the nearby smaller locality of Anglo–Tignish (meaning "English Tignish"). Many of Tignish residents today are either of Acadian or Irish heritage.

One of the town's most popular and defining structures is the local Catholic church, St. Simon & St. Jude Catholic Church, which was among the first major structures built in Tignish, constructed between 1857 and 1860. Tignish was designated a community or village in 1952. It changed its status to a town in 2017.

== Demographics ==
Federal census population history of Tignish
Year	Pop.	±%
1956	914	—
1961	994	+8.8%
1966	982	−1.2%
1971	1,060	+7.9%
1976	1,077	+1.6%
1981	982	−8.8%
1986	960	−2.2%
1991	893	−7.0%
1996	839	−6.0%
2001	831	−1.0%
2006	758	−8.8%
2011	779	+2.8%
2016	719	−7.7%
2021	744	+3.5%
Source: Statistics Canada

In the 2021 Census of Population conducted by Statistics Canada, Tignish had a population of 744 living in 348 of its 368 total private dwellings, a change of 3.5% from its 2016 population of 719. With a land area of 5.87 km^{2} (2.27 sq mi), it had a population density of 126.7/km^{2} (328.3/sq mi) in 2021.

== History ==
Tignish was settled in 1799 by eight Acadian families. Two Irish families joined them in 1811.

Tignish was once the western terminus of the Prince Edward Island Railway. Rail service to the town was abandoned in 1989.

== Community ==
Famed landmark, St. Simon & St. Jude Church.

Fishing is one of the most important aspects of daily life and employment in Tignish, with many local families depending on this industry for income. There are three functioning harbors located in the Tignish area: the Tignish harbour, the Skinner's Pond harbour, and the Seacow Pond harbour.

Citizens of Tignish celebrated the bicentennial of Tignish in 1999. Among local festivities were Acadian music, local parties, carnivals, and the creation of a local music CD rich with the voices of Tignish residents. In addition, each summer there is a bluegrass festival that is held in Tignish.

== Education ==
Kindergarten–12 students in the Tignish area mostly attend Tignish Elementary School from grades K–6, followed by Merritt E. Callaghan Intermediate school for grades 7–9 and Westisle Composite High school for grades 10–12.

== Government ==
Tignish is within district #27 of PEI's electoral boundaries, which is labeled Tignish–Palmer Road. There is a polling station at the Tignish fire hall, and others located elsewhere in Tignish as well as in St. Felix and Palmer Road. The name of the district used to be "Tignish–DeBlois", but was changed to "Tignish–Palmer Road" before the 2007 provincial election with slight boundary changes. As of the 2011 provincial election, Hal Perry is the MLA for the region. Perry left the PCs and joined the Liberals on 3 October 2013. As a Liberal, Perry won re-election in 2015, 2019 and 2023.

Tignish federal election results
Year	Liberal		Conservative		New Democratic		Green	
2021	59%	224	34%	128	3%	11	2%	8
2019	52%	224	38%	164	5%	21	5%	20

Tignish provincial election results
Year	PC		Liberal		Green	
2019	32%	96	47%	141	21%	64
2015	30%	118	62%	248	6%	24

== Surrounding communities ==
Nearby smaller localities, considered to be "part of" Tignish due to their proximity, include:

- Ascension (2 mi NW of Tignish)
- St. Felix (2 mi S)
- Harper (2 mi SW)
- Leoville (3.5 mi SW)
- Peterville (2.5 mi SW)
- Nail Pond (3 mi N)
- Greenmount (3.5 mi S)
- Skinner's Pond (5 mi NW)
- St. Peter and St. Paul (3 mi S)
- Kildare North (4 mi SE)
- Tignish Shore (2 mi E)
- Anglo Tignish (2 mi NE)
- Seacow Pond (5 mi NE)
- Norway (6 mi NE)
- Christopher's Cross (1 mile NE)

== Mars crater namesake ==
The name "Tignish" has been adopted by the International Astronomical Union for a crater on the surface of Mars. The crater is located at −30.71 degrees south by 86.9 degrees east on the Martian surface. It was officially adopted by the IAU/WGPSN in 1991, and has a diameter of 13.7 miles (22.0 km).

== Climate ==
Tignish experiences a humid continental climate (Koppen: Dfb) with four seasons, with winter being the longest. Summers are very mild to warm due to the Gulf of St Lawrence moderating temperatures during the warmer months. Wintertime is very cold with daily highs often below freezing.

Climate data for Tignish
Month	Jan	Feb	Mar	Apr	May	Jun	Jul	Aug	Sep	Oct	Nov	Dec	Year
Record high °C (°F)	12.5 (54.5)	11.1 (52.0)	16.5 (61.7)	23 (73)	36.1 (97.0)	33 (91)	33.5 (92.3)	33 (91)	30 (86)	25 (77)	22 (72)	15 (59)	36.1 (97.0)
Mean daily maximum °C (°F)	−4.3 (24.3)	−3.8 (25.2)	0.8 (33.4)	6.2 (43.2)	13.9 (57.0)	19.6 (67.3)	23.4 (74.1)	22.9 (73.2)	17.8 (64.0)	11.7 (53.1)	5.5 (41.9)	−0.8 (30.6)	9.4 (48.9)
Mean daily minimum °C (°F)	−12.8 (9.0)	−12.5 (9.5)	−7.4 (18.7)	−1.7 (28.9)	3.8 (38.8)	9.6 (49.3)	13.6 (56.5)	13.4 (56.1)	9.1 (48.4)	4 (39)	−1 (30)	−8.2 (17.2)	0.8 (33.4)
Record low °C (°F)	−30 (−22)	−27 (−17)	−24 (−11)	−12.5 (9.5)	−6.7 (19.9)	−1.5 (29.3)	4 (39)	3.9 (39.0)	−2 (28)	−6.5 (20.3)	−14 (7)	−24 (−11)	−30 (−22)
Average precipitation mm (inches)	105.5 (4.15)	80.4 (3.17)	80.6 (3.17)	82.5 (3.25)	83.6 (3.29)	79.1 (3.11)	96 (3.8)	81 (3.2)	83.6 (3.29)	109.1 (4.30)	107.4 (4.23)	116.9 (4.60)	1,105.6 (43.53)
Source: Environment Canada

== See also ==
- List of communities in Prince Edward Island
