= U Sports women's basketball =

University women's basketball

- Formerly: CIAU women's basketball, CIS women's basketball
- Sport: Basketball
- Founded: 1977; 49 years ago
- No. of teams: 48, in four conferences
- Country: Canada
- Most recent champion: Saskatchewan Huskies
- Most titles: Victoria Vikes (9)
- Website: usports.ca/wbkb

U Sports women's basketball is the highest level of play of women's basketball at the university level under the auspices of U Sports, Canada's governing body for university sports. There are 48 teams, all of which are based in Canada, that are divided into four conferences that are eligible to compete for the year-end championship. As these players compete at the university level, they are obligated to follow the rule of standard eligibility of five years. The winning team of the U Sports women's basketball championship is awarded the Bronze Baby trophy. The championship has been played for since 1972, with the UBC Thunderettes capturing the inaugural championship.

== History ==
A national university women's basketball championship in Canada was founded in 1972 as the Canadian Women's Interuniversity Athletic Union, and has been named over time as the Canadian Interuniversity Athletic Union (1979-2001), Canadian Interuniversity Sport (2001-2016), and is now branded as U Sports. This national league was created after the growth of women's sport and merger of regional conferences in the late 60s and early 70s.

== Participating Universities ==
As of the 2019–2020 U Sports season, 48 of the 56 U Sports member institutions have women's basketball teams. The teams are split into four conferences with some conferences splitting teams further into divisions. With the addition of Ontario Tech for the 2019–20 season, the OUA moved to three six-team divisions. The Canada West conference had two divisions, but reverted to a one conference format for the 2016–17 season with 17 teams. The AUS conference has eight teams while the RSEQ conference has five.

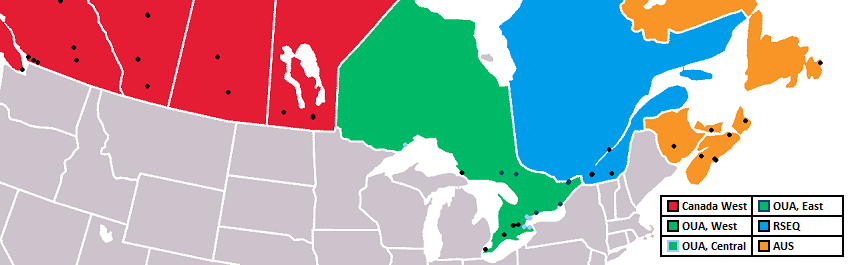

=== Atlantic University Sport ===
University	Varsity Name	City	Province	School Founded	Arena	Arena Capacity
Acadia University	Axewomen	Wolfville, Annapolis Valley	NS	1838		
Cape Breton University	Capers	Sydney, Nova Scotia	NS	1951		
Dalhousie University	Tigers	Halifax	NS	1818	Dalhousie Memorial Arena	1,280
Memorial University of Newfoundland	Sea-Hawks	Saint John's	NL	1925		
University of Prince Edward Island	Panthers	Charlottetown	PEI	1969	MacLauchlan Arena	
Saint Mary's University	Huskies	Halifax	NS	1802	Alumni Arena	1,000
St. Francis Xavier University	X-Women	Antigonish	NS	1853	Charles V. Keating Centre	1,500
University of New Brunswick	Reds	Fredericton	NB	1785	Aitken University Centre	3,278

=== Canada West Universities Athletic Association ===
University	Varsity Name	City	Province	School Founded	Arena	Arena Capacity
University of Alberta	Pandas	Edmonton	AB	1908	Clare Drake Arena	3,000
Brandon University	Bobcats	Brandon	MB	1889		
University of British Columbia	Thunderbirds	Vancouver	BC	1906	Doug Mitchell Thunderbird Sports Centre	5,054
University of Calgary	Dinos	Calgary	AB	1966	Father David Bauer Olympic Arena	1,750
University of the Fraser Valley	Cascades	Abbotsford, Agassiz, Chilliwack, Hope & Mission, British Columbia	BC	1974		
University of Lethbridge	Horns	Lethbridge	AB	1967	1st Choice Savings Centre for Sport & Wellness	2,000
MacEwan University	Griffins	Edmonton	AB	1971	Downtown Community Arena	1,000
University of Manitoba	Bisons	Winnipeg	MB	1877	Max Bell Centre	2,121
Mount Royal University	Cougars	Calgary	AB	1931	Flames Community Arenas	500
University of Northern British Columbia	Timberwolves	Prince George	BC	1990		
University of British Columbia (Okanagan Campus)	Heat	Kelowna	BC			
University of Regina	Cougars	Regina	SK	1974	The Co-Operators Centre	1,300
University of Saskatchewan	Huskies	Saskatoon	SK	1907	Merlis Belsher Place	2,300
Thompson Rivers University	WolfPack	Kamloops	BC	1970	Tournament Capital Centre	
Trinity Western University	Spartans	Langley	BC	1962	Langley Events Centre	5,300
University of Victoria	Vikes	Victoria	BC	1963		
University of Winnipeg	Wesmen	Winnipeg	MB	1871		

=== Ontario University Athletics ===
==== East Division ====
University	Varsity Name	City	Province	School Founded	Arena	Arena Capacity
Carleton University	Ravens	Ottawa	ON	1952		
Laurentian University	Voyageurs	Sudbury	ON	1960	Countryside Arena	
Nipissing University	Lakers	North Bay	ON	1992	North Bay Memorial Gardens	4,246
Ontario Tech University	Ridgebacks	Oshawa	ON	2002	Campus Ice Centre	800
University of Ottawa	Gee-Gees	Ottawa	ON	1894	Sport Complex Arena	850
Queen's University	Gaels	Kingston	ON	1841	Kingston Memorial Centre	3,300

==== West Division ====
University	Varsity Name	City	Province	School Founded	Arena	Arena Capacity
Algoma University	Thunderbirds	Sault Ste. Marie	ON	1965		
University of Guelph	Gryphons	Guelph	ON	1964	Gryphon Centre Arena	1,400
University of Waterloo	Warriors	Waterloo	ON	1957	Carl Totzke Court at the Physical Activities Complex	5,000
University of Western Ontario	Mustangs	London	ON	1878	Thompson Arena	
Wilfrid Laurier University	Golden Hawks	Waterloo	ON	1957	Waterloo Recreation Complex	3,400
University of Windsor	Lancers	Windsor	ON	1857		

==== Central Division ====
University	Varsity Name	City	Province	School Founded	Arena	Arena Capacity
Brock University	Badgers	St. Catharines	ON	1964	Seymour-Hannah Sports & Entertainment Centre	1,400
Toronto Metropolitan University	Bold	Toronto	ON	1948	Mattamy Athletic Centre at the Gardens	2,796
Lakehead University	Thunderwolves	Thunder Bay	ON	1947		
McMaster University	Marauders	Hamilton	ON	1887		
University of Toronto	Varsity Blues	Toronto	ON	1827	Goldring Centre for High Performance Sport	2,000
York University	Lions	Toronto	ON	1959	Tait McKenzie Centre	

=== Réseau du sport étudiant du Québec ===
University	Varsity Name	City	Province	School Founded	Arena	Arena Capacity
Bishop's University	Gaiters	Sherbrooke	QC	1843	Jane & Eric Molson Arena	800
Concordia University	Stingers	Montreal	QC	1896	Ed Meagher Arena	
Université Laval	Rouge et Or	Laval	QC	1663		
McGill University	Martlets	Montreal	QC	1821		
Université du Québec à Montréal	Citadins	Montreal	QC	1969		

== Conference championships ==
= Indicates national champion

=== Critelli Cup (OUA) ===
The OUA postseason tournament champions are awarded the Critelli Cup.

Year	Winning team	Coach
2022	Ryerson Rams women's basketball	Carly Clarke
2020	Brock Badgers women's basketball	Mike Rao
2019	McMaster Marauders	Theresa Burns
2018	Carleton Ravens women's basketball	Taffe Charles
2017	Carleton Ravens women's basketball	Taffe Charles
2016	Ryerson Rams women's basketball	Carly Clarke
2015	Windsor Lancers women's basketball	Chantal Vallée
2014	Windsor Lancers women's basketball	Chantal Vallée
2013	Windsor Lancers women's basketball	Chantal Vallée
2012	Ottawa Gee-Gees	Andy Sparks
2011	Windsor Lancers women's basketball	Chantal Vallée
2010	Windsor Lancers women's basketball	Chantal Vallée
2009	Windsor Lancers women's basketball	Chantal Vallée
2008	McMaster Marauders	Theresa Burns
2007	York Lions	
2006	McMaster Marauders	Theresa Burns
2005	Guelph Gryphons	
2004	Ottawa Gee-Gees	Andy Sparks
2003	McMaster Marauders	Theresa Burns
2002	Toronto Varsity Blues	
2001	Queen's Golden Gaels	
2000	Laurentian Voyageurs	

Year	Winning team	Coach
1999	McMaster Marauders	Theresa Burns
1998	Laurentian Voyageurs	
1997	Toronto Varsity Blues	
1996	Toronto Varsity Blues	
1995	Laurentian Voyageurs	
1994	Toronto Varsity Blues	
1993	Laurentian Voyageurs	
1992	Laurentian Voyageurs	
1991	Laurentian Voyageurs	Peter Ennis
1990	Laurentian Voyageurs	Peter Ennis
1989	Toronto Varsity Blues	
1988	Toronto Varsity Blues	
1987	Laurentian Voyageurs	
1986	Toronto Varsity Blues	Michele Belanger
1985	Toronto Varsity Blues	
1984	Toronto Varsity Blues	
1983	Brock Badgers	Pat Woodburn
1982	York Lions	
1981	Laurentian Voyageurs	
1980	Guelph Gryphons	
1979	Laurentian Voyageurs	Norm Vickery
1978	Laurentian Voyageurs	Norm Vickery
1977	Laurentian Voyageurs	Norm Vickery
1976	Laurentian Voyageurs	Norm Vickery
1975	Laurentian Voyageurs	Norm Vickery
1974	Western Mustangs	
1973	Western Mustangs	
1972	Western Mustangs	

==== Championships by School ====
Team	Wins	Losses	Appearances	MRC	MRA
Laurentian Lady Vees	14		14	2000	2000
Toronto Varsity Blues	9 (1984, 1985, 1986, 1988, 1989, 1994, 1996, 1997, 2002)	7 (1982, 1987, 1990, 1992, 1993, 1995, 2008)	16	2002	2011
Windsor Lancers	6	1 (2012)	7	2015	2015
McMaster Marauders	5	1 (2018)	6	2019	2019
TMU Bold (formerly Ryerson Rams)	2	2 (2015, 2020)	4	2022	2022
Western Mustangs	3		3	1974	1974
Carleton Ravens	2	3 (2011, 2013)	5	2018	2018
Ottawa Gee-Gees	2	3 (2010, 2016, 2019)	5	2012	2019
York Lions	2		2	2007	2007
Guelph Gryphons	2		2	2005	2005
Brock Badgers	1	1 (2022)	2	2020	2022
Queen's Golden Gaels	1	2 (2014, 2017)	3	2001	2017

- MRC = Most Recent Championship
- MRA = Most Recent Appearance

=== Atlantic University Sport ===
- 2013-14: Saint Mary's
- 2012-13: Saint Mary's
- 2011-12: Acadia
- 2010-11: Cape Breton
- 2008-09: Cape Breton
- 2007-08: Memorial
- 2006-07: Memorial
- 2005-06: Cape Breton
- 2004-05: Memorial
- 1990-91: UNB
- 1970-71: UNB
- 1959-60: UNB
- 1958-59: UNB
- 1957-58: Mt. Allison
- 1956-57: UNB
- 1955-56: Dalhousie
- 1954-55: Dalhousie
- 1953-54: Dalhousie
- 1952-53: Dalhousie
- 1951-52: Acadia

=== Canada West ===
Year	Winning team	Coach
2020	Saskatchewan Huskies women's basketball	Lisa Thomaidis
2019	Saskatchewan Huskies women's basketball	Lisa Thomaidis
2018	Regina Cougars	Dave Taylor
2017	Saskatchewan Huskies women's basketball	Lisa Thomaidis
2016	Saskatchewan Huskies women's basketball	Lisa Thomaidis
2015	UBC Thunderbirds women's basketball	Debbie Huband
2014	Saskatchewan Huskies women's basketball	Lisa Thomaidis
2013	Regina Cougars	Dave Taylor
2012	UBC Thunderbirds women's basketball	Debbie Huband
2011	Saskatchewan Huskies women's basketball	Lisa Thomaidis
2010	Simon Fraser Clan	Bruce Langford
2008	UBC Thunderbirds women's basketball	Debbie Huband
2007	UBC Thunderbirds women's basketball	Debbie Huband

==== Championships by School ====
Team	Wins	Losses	Appearances	MRC	MRA
Victoria Vikes women's basketball	17 (1976, 1977, 1978, 1980, 1981, 1982, 1983, 1985, 1986, 1987, 1992, 1995, 1996, 1997, 1998, 1999, 2000)			2000	2000
Saskatchewan Huskies women's basketball	8 (2006, 2011, 2014, 2016, 2017, 2019, 2020, 2022)			2022	2022
UBC Thunderbirds women's basketball	8 (1973, 1974, 1975, 1994, 2007, 2008, 2012, 2015)			2015	2015
Simon Fraser Clan	5 (2002, 2005, 2007, 2009, 2010)			2010	2010
Regina Cougars	3 (2004, 2013, 2018)	1 (2019)	4	2018	2019
Alberta Pandas	0	1 (2020)	1		2020
Lethbridge Pronghorns	1 (1993)		1	1993	1993

== Awards and honours ==
=== U Sports championship MVP ===
2024-25 Gage Grassick, Saskatchewan
2023-24 Kali Pocrnic, Carleton
2022-23 Kali Pocrnic, Carleton
2021-22 Jama Bin-Edward, Toronto Metropolitan
2020-21 None
2019-20 Sabine Dukate, Saskatchewan
2018-19 Linnaea Harper, McMaster
2017-18 Elizabeth Leblanc, Carleton
2016-17 Alex Kiss-Rusk, McGill
2015-16 Dalyce Emmerson, Saskatchewan
2014-15 Korissa Williams, Windsor
2013-14 Miah-Marie Langlois, Windsor
2012-13 Korissa Williams, Windsor
2011-12 Miah-Marie Langlois, Windsor
2010-11 Miah-Marie Langlois, Windsor
2009-10 Robyn Buna, Simon Fraser
2008-09 Matteke Hutzler, Simon Fraser
2007-08 Erica McGuinness, UBC
2006-07 Laurelle Weigl, Simon Fraser
2005-06 Kelsey Blair, UBC
2004-05 Dani Langford, Simon Fraser
2003-04 Carrie Watson, UBC
2002-03 Lindsay Anderson, Victoria
2001-02 Teresa Kleindienst, Simon Fraser
2000-01 Cymone Bouchard, Regina
1999-00 Lindsay Brooke, Victoria
1998-99 Jackie Simon, Alberta
1997-98 Lindsay Brooke, Victoria
1996-97 Terri-Lee Johannesson, Manitoba
1995-96 Terri-Lee Johannesson, Manitoba
1994-95 Sandra Carroll, Winnipeg
1993-94 Sandra Carroll, Winnipeg
1992-93 Michelle Chambers, Winnipeg
1991-92 Jenny Sutton, Victoria
1990-91 Dianne Norman, Laurentian
1989-90 Shirlene McLean, Laurentian
1988-89 Veronica VanderSchee, Calgary
1987-88 Kim Bertholet, Manitoba
1986-87 Janet Fowler, Victoria
1985-86 Angela Orton, Toronto
1984-85 Lori Clarke, Victoria
1983-84 (*) Andrea Blackwell and Lynn Polson, Bishop's
1982-83 Andrea Blackwell, Bishop's
1981-82 Luanne Hebb, Victoria
1980-81 Shelly Godfrey, Victoria
1979-80 Carol Turney-Loos, Victoria
1978-79 Sylvia Sweeney, Laurentian
1977-78 Debbie Huband, Bishop’s

- co-winners/co-gagnants

=== Player of the year (Nan Copp Award) ===
2024-25 Gage Grassick, Saskatchewan
2023-24 Jayda Veinot, UNB
2022-23 Sarah Gates, McMaster
2021-22 Keylyn Filewich, Winnipeg
2020-21 Not Awarded (COVID-19)
2019-20 Jenna Mae Ellsworth, UPEI
2018-19 Sarah-Jane Marois, Laval
2017-18 Paloma Andreson, Acadia
2016-17 Danielle Boiago, McMaster
2015-16 Keneca Pingue-Giles, Ryerson
2014-15 Jylisa Williams, Lakehead
2013-14 Justine Colley, Saint Mary’s
2012-13 Justine Colley, Saint Mary’s
2011-12 Hannah Sunley-Paisley, Ottawa
2010-11 Jessica Clemençon, Windsor
2009-10 Robyn Buna Simon, Fraser
2008-09 Kayla Dykstra, Victoria
2007-08 Lani Gibbons, Simon Fraser
2006-07 Sarah Crooks, Saskatchewan
2005-06 Sarah Crooks, Saskatchewan
2004-05 JoAnne Wells, Winnipeg
2003-04 Cymone Bouchard, Regina
2002-03 Jessica Kaczowka, Simon Fraser
2001-02 Jessica Kaczowka Simon Fraser
2000-01 Leighann Doan, Calgary
1999-00 Leighann Doan, Calgary
1998-99 Corrin Wersta, Regina
1997-98 Anne Smith, Manitoba
1996-97 Vicky Tessier, McGill
1995-96 Justine Ellison, Toronto
1994-95 Sandra Carroll, Winnipeg
1993-94 Sandra Carroll, Winnipeg
1992-93 Sandra Carroll, Winnipeg
1991-92 Susan Stewart, Laurentian
1990-91 Jodi Evans, Calgary
1989-90 Veronica VanderSchee, Calgary
1988-89 Kim Bertholet, Manitoba
1987-88 Veronica VanderSchee, Calgary
1986-87 Lori Clarke, Victoria
1985-86 Pat Melville, Toronto
1984-85 Carol Hamilton, Laurentian
1983-84 Andrea Blackwell, Bishop's
1982-83 Tracie McAra, Victoria
1981-82 Luanne Hebb, Victoria
1980-81 Janis Paskevich, Calgary
1979-80 Carol Turney-Loos, Victoria

=== Rookie of the year ===
Kathy Shields Award

2024-25 Keira Daly, UBC
2023-24 Catrina Garvey, Toronto Metropolitan
2022-23 Jacqueline Urban, Carleton
2021-22 Kiyara Letlow, Cape Breton
2020-21 None
2019-20 Jael Kabunda, Bishop’s
2018-19 Myriam Leclerc, Concordia
2017-18 Carolina Gonçalves, Regina
2016-17 Kyanna Giles, Regina
2015-16 Brooklyn Legault, Alberta
2014-15 Bridget Atkinson, Guelph
2013-14 Alison Keough, Cape Breton
2012-13 Mariam Sylla, McGill
2011-12 Vanessa Pickard, StFX
2010-11 Claire Colborne, UNB
2009-10 Jessica Clemençon, Windsor
2008-09 Chanelle St-Amour, Laval
2007-08 Cora Duval, UQAM
2006-07 Laurelle Weigl, Simon Fraser
2005-06 Amanda Anderson Western
2004-05 Laura MacCallum, York
2003-04 Cassandra Carpenter, Laurentian
2002-03 Kelsey Blair, UBC
2001-02 Julie Devenny, Waterloo
2000-01 Josée Lalonde, Laval
1999-00 Julie Galipeau, Saint Mary's
1998-99 Danielle Everitt, McMaster
1997-98 Valérie Samson, Laval
1996-97 Leighann Doan, Calgary
1995-96 Andrea Gottselig, Regina
1994-95 Marjorie Kelly, Manitoba
1993-94 Carolyn Wares, Dalhousie
1992-93 Vicky Tessier, McGill
1991-92 Theresa McCuish, StFX
1990-91 Darcel Wright, Ryerson
1989-90 Dianne Norman, Laurentian

=== Defensive Player of the year ===
2024-25 Clara Gascoigne, Saint Mary’s
2023-24 Claire Signatovich, Alberta
2022-23 Claire Signatovich, Alberta
2021-22 Summer Masikewich, Saskatchewan
2020-21 None
2019-20 Khaléann Caron-Goudreau, Laval
2018-19 Khaléann Caron-Gaudreau, Laval
2017-18 Elizabeth Leblanc, Carleton
2016-17 Antoinette Miller, Winnipeg
2015-16 Kennisha-Shanice Luberisse, Saint Mary’s
2014-15 Korissa Williams, Windsor
2013-14 Miah-Marie Langlois, Windsor
2012-13 Miah-Marie Langlois, Windsor
2011-12 Miah-Marie Langlois, Windsor
2010-11 Katie Miyazaki, Saskatchewan
2009-10 Katie Miyazaki, Simon Fraser
2008-09 Leanne Evans, UBC
2007-08 Rachel Hart, McMaster
2006-07 Rachel Hart, Manitoba
2005-06 Chiara Rocca, McMaster
2004-05 Jody Potts, Victoria
2003-04 Carrie Watson, UBC
2002-03 Cymone Bouchard, Regina
2001-02 Teresa Kleindienst, Simon Fraser and Clare Beatty, Laurentian
2000-01 Marjorie Kelly, Manitoba

=== Outstanding student-athlete ===
Sylvia Sweeney Award

2024-25 Katie Butts, UNB
2023-24 Nikki Cabuco, Fraser Valley
2022-23 Aliyah Fraser, StFX
2021-22 Brigitte Lefebvre-Okankwu, Ottawa
2020-21 None
2019-20 Julia Curran, Western
2018-19 Hilary Hanaka, McMaster
2017-18 Kiera Rigby, UPEI
2016-17 Katie Ross, Acadia
2015-16 Ainsley MacIntyre, Dalhousie
2014-15 Kimberley Veldman, Lethbridge
2013-14 Hailey Milligan, McMaster
2012-13 Alexa McCarthy, Fraser Valley
2011-12 Lindsay Druery, Lakehead
2010-11 Jill Humbert, Saskatchewan
2009-10 Michele Hynes, Manitoba
2008-09 Courtney Gerwing, Simon Fraser
2007-08 Michelle Buhler, UCFV
2006-07 Stephanie Yallin, Guelph
2005-06 Michelle Smith, Alberta
2004-05 Maria-Jose Raposo, Concordia
2003-04 Krystal O'Bryne, Victoria
2002-03 Anna Drewniak, Manitoba
2001-02 Jacqueline Lavallée, Saskatchewan
2000-01 Lindsay Brooke, Victoria
1999-00 Andrea Gottselig, Regina
1998-99 Rania Burns, Alberta
1997-98 Shelly Dewar, Laurentian
1996-97 Nadine Fennig, Alberta
1995-96 Jaylene Morrison, Queen’s
1994-95 Adair Duncan, UBC
1993-94 Larisa Waschuk, Winnipeg

=== Coach of the Year ===
Peter Ennis Award

2024-25 Dani Sinclair, Carleton
2023-24 Lisa Thomaidis, Saskatchewan
2022-23 Dave Taylor, Regina
2021-22 Carly Clarke, Toronto Metropolitan
2020-21 None
2019-20 Mike Rao, Brock
2018-19 Guillaume Giroux, Laval
2017-18 Taffe Charles, Carleton
2016-17 Dave Wilson, Queen’s
2015-16 Ryan Thorne, McGill
2014-15 Chantal Vallée, Windsor
2013-14 Chantal Vallée, Windsor
2012-13 Scott Munro, Saint Mary’s
2011-12 Dave Taylor, Regina
2010-11 Lisa Thomaidis, Saskatchewan
2009-10 Brian Cheng, Victoria
2008-09 Lisa Thomaidis, Saskatchewan
2007-08 Theresa Burns, McMaster
2006-07 Scott Edwards, Alberta
2005-06 Fabian McKenzie, Cape Breton
2004-05 Bruce Langford, Simon Fraser
2003-04 Debbie Huband, UBC
2002-03 Douglas Partridge, Memorial
2001-02 Bruce Langford, Simon Fraser
2000-01 Linda Marquis, Laval
1999-00 Linda Marquis, Laval
1998-99 Kathy Shields, Victoria
1997-98 Coleen Dufresne, Manitoba
1996-97 Christine Stapleton, Regina
1995-96 Ron Carew, Cape Breton
1994-95 Tom Kendall, Winnipeg
1993-94 Tom Kendall, Winnipeg
1992-93 Tom Kendall, Winnipeg
1991-92 Kathy Shields, Victoria
1990-91 Peter Ennis, Laurentian
1989-90 Donna Rudakas, Calgary
1988-89 Donna Rudakas, Calgary
1987-88 Coleen Dufresne, Manitoba
1986-87 Peter Ennis, Laurentian
1985-86 Sherry Melney, Alberta
1984-85 Louisa Zerbe, Lethbridge
1983-84 Wayne Hussey, Bishop’s
1982-83 Coleen Dufresne, UNB
1981-82 Tom Kendall, Winnipeg
1980-81 Wayne Hussey, Bishop’s
1979-80 Kathy Shields, Victoria
1978-79 Marilyn McNeil, Calgary
1977-78 Mike Gallo, Victoria

=== Fair Play Award ===
R.W. Pugh Fair Play Award

2015-16 Krista Van Slingerland, Ottawa
2014-15 Ryerson University
2013-14 Jessica Clemençon, Windsor
2012-13 Not awarded
2011-12 Not awarded
2010-11 Ashley Stephen, StFX
2009-10 Lindsay DeGroot, Saskatchewan
2008-09 Not awarded
2007-08 Not awarded
2006-07 Julia Wilson, Simon Fraser

=== Perseverance Award ===
Tracy MacLeod Award

2024-25 Ally Smith, Queen’s
2023-24 Serena Tchida, Concordia
2022-23 Bridget Mulholland, Queen’s
2021-22 Myriam Leclerc, Concordia
2020-21 None
2019-20 Addison Martin, Manitoba
2018-19 Lanae Adams, Acadia
2017-18 Lena Wenke, Winnipeg
2016-17 Vanessa Pickard, McMaster
2015-16 Krista Van Slingerland, Ottawa
2014-15 Kellie Ring, Ottawa
2013-14 Gemma Bullard, Queen’s
2012-13 Amber Hillis, Wilfrid Laurier
2011-12 Laura Mullins, Windsor
2010-11 Brittany Dalton, Memorial
2009-10 Anneth Him-Lazarenko, McGill
2008-09 Vanessa Forstbauer, Victoria
2007-08 Rachel Hart, McMaster
2006-07 Julia Wilson, Simon Fraser
2005-06 Devon Campbell, Simon Fraser
2004-05 Cory Bekkering, Calgary
2003-04 Heather Thompson, Winnipeg
2002-03 Fiona Tozer, Brock
2001-02 Debra Hidson, Calgary
2000-01 Nicole Poier, Saskatchewan
1999-00 Janet Wells, Dalhousie
1998-99 Angela Hrkac, Lakehead
1997-98 Patricia Wood, Brandon
1996-97 Karen Arnott, Guelph

== Top 100 ==
In celebration of the centennial anniversary of U SPORTS women's basketball, a committee of U SPORTS women's basketball coaches and partners revealed a list of the Top 100 women's basketball players. Commemorating the 100th anniversary of the first Canadian university women's contest between the Queen's Gaels and McGill Martlets on Feb. 6, 1920, the list of the Top 100 was gradually revealed over four weeks. Culminating with the All-Canadian Gala, which also recognized national award winners.

=== 1930-1980 ===
Player	Team(s)	Years	Accolades
Ruth Wilson	UBC	1937-41	
Nora McDermott	UBC	1945-49	She coached the bronze medal-winning women's basketball squad at the 1967 Pan American Games
Patricia Lawson	Saskatchewan	1947-50	
Arlene McGinn	Saskatchewan	1950-54	
Mary MacDonald	Toronto	1951-53	
Linda Winter-Barrett	Memorial	1956-58	
Darlene Currie	Calgary	1956-58	
Ann Mosher-MacVicar	Acadia	1957-61	
Barb Robertson	UBC	1959-64	
Sandra Barr	UNB	1964-68	
Mary Coutts	Victoria	1965-67	
Pauline Genzick	UBC	1966-69	
Betty Ross	UBC	1966-71	
Joanne Sargent	UBC	1968-73	
Terri McGovern	UBC	1969-72	
Bev Barnes	UBC	1970-74	
Joyce Douthwright-Slipp	UNB	1971-74	She competed for the Canada women's national basketball team from 1969 to 1976. She played at the 1971 FIBA World Championship for Women and 1975 FIBA World Championship for Women. In international competitions, Slipp was on the Canadian team that placed sixth at the 1976 Summer Olympics. In 1976, Slipp became the head coach of the women's basketball team at the University of New Brunswick. From 1976 to 1980, Slipp had 63 wins and 23 losses with UNB.
Debbie Phelan	UBC	1970-75	
Kathy Williams-Shields	UBC; Laurentian	1969-71; 1972-76	
Angie Johnson	Winnipeg	1971-77	Competed in the World University Games in Moscow; Played for Canada at the 1973 World championships in Cali, Colombia; Competed at the 1975 Pan American Games in Mexico City; Played for Canada in Basketball at the 1976 Summer Olympics; Member of Manitoba Sports Hall of Fame (inducted 2007)
Coleen Dufresne	Ottawa; McGill	1971-80	Played for Canada in Basketball at the 1976 Summer Olympics
Liz Silcott	Concordia; Waterloo; UBC	1972-79	
Sylvia Sweeney	McGill; Concordia; Laurentian	1973-79	Played for Canada in Basketball at the 1976 Summer Olympics; Played for Canada in Basketball at the 1984 Summer Olympics
Carol Turney-Loos	Saint Mary's; Victoria; UBC	1973-80	Recipient of the 1980 Nan Copp Award
Chris Critelli	Winnipeg; Laurentian	1974-78	Played for Canada in Basketball at the 1976 Summer Olympics
Debbie Huband	Bishop's; Concordia	1976-80	Captained Bishop's to three consecutive QUAA titles from 1977 to 1980; Played for Canada in Basketball at the 1984 Summer Olympics; Set a Canada West record with 344 coaching wins with the UBC Thunderbirds women's basketball program

=== 1980 to 1990 ===
Player	Team(s)	Years	Accolades
Janis Paskevich-MacDonald	Calgary	1977-82	
Luanne Hebb Krawetz	Victoria	1977-82	Won bronze at the 1979 FIBA World Championship for Women
Candi Clarkson-Lohr	Guelph; Brock	1977-84	Played for Canada in Basketball at the 1984 Summer Olympics
Anna Pendergast-Stammberger	Dalhousie	1978-83	Played for Canada in Basketball at the 1984 Summer Olympics
Tracie McAra-Sibbald	Victoria	1978-83	Played for Canada in Basketball at the 1984 Summer Olympics
Andrea Blackwell	Bishop's	1979-84	Played for Canada in Basketball at the 1984 Summer Olympics
Lynn Polson	Bishop's	1980-84	Played for Canada in Basketball at the 1984 Summer Olympics; Won a bronze medal for Canada at the 1986 FIBA World Championship for Women
Patricia Melville	Toronto	1980-86	
Sandy Espeseth	Victoria	1981-88	
Angela Orton	Toronto	1982-86	
Beth Cochran	Winnipeg	1982-87	
Karla Karch	Calgary; Victoria	1982-88	
Carol Hamilton	Laurentian	1984-87	Bronze medalist at 1986 FIBA World Championship for Women
Lori Clarke	Victoria	1984-87	Won bronze at the 1986 FIBA World Championship for Women; Victoria Vikes Hall of Fame Class of 2019 Inductee
Janet Fowler	Victoria	1984-87	Won bronze at the 1986 FIBA World Championship for Women
Mary-Ann Kowal	Toronto	1984-89	
Kathy MacCormack-Spurr	Dalhousie	1985-89	
Veronica VanderSchee	Calgary	1985-90	

=== 1990 to 2000 ===
Player	Team(s)	Years	Accolades
Kelly Boucher	Calgary; Victoria	1985-91	Played for Canada in Basketball at the 1996 Summer Olympics; Also played for Canada in Basketball at the 2000 Summer Olympics; Competed for the Charlotte Sting of the Women's National Basketball Association (WNBA).
Cynthia Johnston	Bishop's	1986-91	Played for Canada in Basketball at the 1996 Summer Olympics; Female Athlete of the Year at Bishop's University
Jodi Evans	Calgary	1986-91	Attended Oxford University as a Rhodes Scholar in 1991; Made history as the first woman to represent the Oxford University men's basketball team in The Varsity Game against Cambridge. Played for Canada in Basketball at the 1996 Summer Olympics
Shawna Molcak-Kolaczek	Lethbridge	1986-91	Played for Canada in Basketball at the 1996 Summer Olympics
Kim Bertholet	Manitoba	1986-91	
Jackie Moore	Regina	1986-91	
Andrea Hlady	Lethbridge	1987-93	
Denise Scott	Toronto	1988-93	
Dianne Norman	Laurentian	1989-95	Played for Canada in Basketball at the 1996 Summer Olympics
Sue Stewart	Laurentian	1989-95	Played for Canada in Basketball at the 1996 Summer Olympics
Sandra Carroll	Winnipeg	1991-95	Won the 1994 Lieutenant Governor Athletic Awards
Michele Vesprini	Western	1991-96	
Theresa MacCuish	StFX	1991-97	
Justine Ellison-Sharp	Toronto	1992-96	Won the 1996 Lieutenant Governor Athletic Awards
Vicky Tessier	McGill	1992-97	
Terri-Lee Johannesson	Manitoba	1993-97	Won the 1997 Lieutenant Governor Athletic Awards
Lisa Koop	Victoria	1993-98	
Stephanie Harrison	Laurentian	1995-00	
Jessica Mills	UBC	1995-00	
Jackie Simon	Alberta	1995-00	
Caroll-Ann Tull	Concordia	1996-99	

=== 2001-2010 ===
Player	Team(s)	Years	Accolades
Anne Smith	Manitoba	1995-01	
Leighann Doan	Calgary	1996-01	Won the 2001 Lieutenant Governor Athletic Awards
Corrin Wersta	Regina	1996-01	
Erin Soroko-Drazic	Winnipeg	1996-01	
Isabelle Grenier	Laval	1998-03	
Cymone Bouchard-Bernauer	Regina	1999-04	
Teresa Kleindienst-Gabriele	Simon Fraser	2000-02	Played for Canada in Basketball at the 2000 Summer Olympics; Played for Canada in Basketball at the 2012 Summer Olympics
Jessica Kaczowka	Simon Fraser	2000-03	Recipient of the 2002 Nan Copp Award; Recipient of the 2003 Nan Copp Award
Jenine Browne-MacFadden	Memorial	2000-05	
JoAnne Wells	Winnipeg	2000-05	
Sarah Crooks	Saskatchewan	2002-07	
Cassandra Carpenter	Laurentian	2003-08	
Lani Gibbons	Simon Fraser	2003-08	
Katherine Quackenbush-Morrow	Memorial	2005-08	
Kelsey Hodgson	Cape Breton	2005-10	
Lindsay Degroot	McMaster; Saskatchewan	2005-10	
Robyn Buna	Simon Fraser	2006-10	

=== 2011-2020 ===
Player	Team(s)	Years	Accolades
Marie-Michelle Genois	Laval	2006-11	
Kayla Dykstra	Victoria	2006-11	Recipient of the 2009 Nan Copp Award
Hannah Sunley-Paisley	Ottawa	2007-12	Recipient of the 2012 Nan Copp Award
Justine Colley	Saint Mary's	2009-14	Recipient of the 2013 and 2014 Nan Copp Award; Won the 2014 Lieutenant Governor Athletic Awards
Jessica Clemencon	Windsor	2009-14	Winner of the 2010 Kathy Shields Award; Recipient of the 2011 Nan Copp Award; Won the 2011 Lieutenant Governor Athletic Awards
Miah-Marie Langlois	Windsor	2009-14	Three-time winner of the CIS Defensive Player of the Year (2012, 2013, 2014); Most Valuable Player of the 2011, 2012 and 2014 CIS National Championship; Played professionally for WBC Dynamo Novosibirsk; Won gold medal for Canada in Basketball at the 2015 Pan American Games; Also won gold medal for Canada in 2015 FIBA Americas Women's Championship and at the 2017 FIBA Women's AmeriCup; Played for Canada in Basketball at the 2016 Summer Olympics
Kristjana Young	UBC	2010-15	
Korissa Williams	Windsor	2010-15	Most Valuable Player of the 2013 and 2015 CIS National Championships; Won the 2015 Lieutenant Governor Athletic Awards
Keneca Pingue-Giles	Ryerson	2011-16	Recipient of the 2016 Nan Copp Award
Danielle Boiago	McMaster	2012-17	Recipient of the 2017 Nan Copp Award
Jylisa Williams	Lakehead	2013-15	Recipient of the 2015 Nan Copp Award
Alison Keough	Cape Breton	2013-18	
Alex Kiss-Rusk	McGill	2013-18	Most Valuable Player of the 2017 CIS National Championship
Antoinette Miller	Saskatchewan; Winnipeg	2013-18	
Paloma Anderson	Acadia	2014-18	Recipient of the 2018 Nan Copp Award; Participated for Canada at 2019 Winter Universiade
Sarah-Jane Marois	Laval	2014-19	Recipient of the 2019 Nan Copp Award; Participated for Canada at 2019 Winter Universiade
Jenna Mae Ellsworth	UPEI	2016–Present	Recipient of the 2020 Nan Copp Award; 2020 UPEI Panthers Female Athlete of the Year
