= Bishop's Gaiters women's basketball =

Women's college basketball team

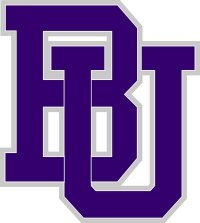
- University: Bishop's University
- Head coach: Craig Norman
- Location: Sherbrooke, Québec
- Conference: Réseau du sport étudiant du Québec
- Nickname: Gaiters
- Colors: Purple and Silver

U Sports tournament champions
- 1983, 1984

U Sports tournament appearances
- 1972, 1973, 1978, 1979, 1980, 1981, 1982, 1983, 1984, 1985, 1990, 1991, 2004

Conference tournament champions
- 1973, 1978, 1979, 1980, 1981, 1982, 1983, 1984, 1990, 1991, 2004

Conference regular-season champions
- 1978, 1979, 1980, 1990, 1991, 2004

Uniforms
Home	Away

The Bishop's Gaiters women's basketball team represents Bishop's University in the RSEQ Conference of U Sports women's basketball. The program has captured the Bronze Baby twice, achieving the feat in back-to-back years (1983–84).

== History ==
The 1982–83 season would result in the Gaiters first national championship. After losing in the Bronze Baby championship game in 1981 and 1982, the Gaiters went undefeated in league play during the regular season. Winning all three games in the National Championship, the path towards an elusive title began with a convincing 77–40 triumph over the University of New Brunswick.

Followed by a semi-final victory versus the OUA champion Brock Badgers women's basketball by a 60-42 margin, the national championship game saw them tip off versus the dynastic Victoria Vikes women's basketball program. Besting them in a convincing 64–49 final, Andrea Blackwell earned the tournament's Most Valuable Player nod.

Following up their emotional championship run in 1983, the Gaiters maintained the momentum for the next campaign. With only two regular season losses in 1983–84, the Gaiters were dominant in their first two games at the National Championships.

Defeating the Manitoba Bisons by a remarkable 32 points, prevailing by an 89-57 tally, the Gaiters met the Brock Badgers for the second consecutive time in the semis. Prevailing in a convincing 60-42 outcome, the University of Winnipeg awaited in the Finals. Going back-to-back with a 70–62 defeat of Winnipeg, Andrea Blackwell and Lynn Polson shared Tounrmanet MVP honours.

Qualifying for the postseason in 2012, the Gaiters would not reach the RSEQ Playoffs until 2018. During the 2017–18 season, Edith Noblecilla finished as the Gaiters’ leading scorer, averaging 12.8 points per game, which ranked sixth in the conference. Pacing all players in the conference with 5.4 assists per game, ranking among the top players nationally, she would also emerge as the conference leader with 2.1 steals per game. By season's end, she was recognized as the Bishop's Gaiters Female Athlete of the Year.

== International ==
- Debbie Huband Canada: Basketball at the 1984 Summer Olympics
- Andrea Blackwell Canada: Basketball at the 1984 Summer Olympics
- Lynn Polson Canada: Basketball at the 1984 Summer Olympics, won a bronze medal for Canada at the 1986 FIBA World Championship for Women
- Cynthia Johnston Canada: Played for Canada in Basketball at the 1996 Summer Olympics
- Victoria Gauna Argentina: 2021 FIBA Women's AmeriCup

== Awards and honors ==
- Cynthia Johnston: Greater Saint John Sports Hall of Fame (2021 inductee)

=== University Awards ===
- 2017-18 Bishop's Gaiters Female Athlete of the Year: Edith Noblecilla
- 2019-20 Bishop's Gaiters Female Athlete of the Year: Amaiquen Siciliano

==== Gaiters Wall of Distinction ====
- Inducted in 1995: Debbie Huband
- Inducted in 1998: Andrea Blackwell
- Inducted in 2000: 1982-83 Women's Basketball Team
- Inducted in 2000: 1983-84 Women's Basketball Team
- Inducted in 2003: Ann Fitzgerald
- Inducted in 2004: Lynn Polson
- Inducted in 2008: Sue Hylland
- Inducted in 2008: Nancy Knowlton
- Inducted in 2016: Cynthia Johnston

=== Team awards ===
Rookie of the Year

- 2005-06:
- 2006-07:
- 2007-08:
- 2008-09:
- 2009-10:
- 2010-11:
- 2011-12:
- 2012-13:
- 2013-14:
- 2014-15:
- 2015-16: Ashley Milhomme
- 2016-17: Metchline Gabelus
- 2017-18: Marie-Evrardine Berrouette
- 2018-19: Amaiquen Siciliano
- 2019-20: Jael Kabunda

Nancy Knowlton Team Award

- 2005-06: Carly Clarke and France Lanoie and Josianne Lafreniere
- 2006-07: Christelle Cote
- 2007-08: Christelle Cote
- 2008-09: Robyn Wilson
- 2009-10: Robyn Wilson
- 2010-11: Melanie Ouellet Godcharles
- 2011-12: Catherine Belanger-Paquet
- 2012-13: Danielle Lumley
- 2013-14: Danielle Lumley
- 2014-15: Danielle Lumley
- 2015-16: Maude Archmbault
- 2016-17: Eva Kuhar
- 2017-18: Maude Archambault
- 2018-19: Marie Berrouette
- 2019-20: Maeva Courla

Most Improved Player

- 2005-06:
- 2006-07:
- 2007-08:
- 2008-09:
- 2009-10:
- 2010-11:
- 2011-12:
- 2012-13:
- 2013-14: Genevieve Onyeka
- 2014-15: Ashely White
- 2015-16: Charlene Pettigrew
- 2016-17: Mara Marchizotti
- 2017-18: Metchline Gabelus
- 2018-19: Sarah Peirson
- 2019-20: Sabrina Kone

Most Valuable Player

- 2001-02: Melissa Lemay
- 2002-03: Catherine Charbonneau
- 2003-04: Anouk Boulanger
- 2004-05: Anouk Boulanger
- 2005-06: Emile Crofton
- 2006-07: Laure Pitfield
- 2007-08: Melanie Ouellet-Godcharles and Jessy Roy
- 2008-09: Melanie Ouellet-Godcharles and Jessy Roy
- 2009-10: Melanie Ouellet-Godcharles and Katy Germain
- 2010-11: Jessy Roy
- 2011-12: Jessy Roy
- 2012-13: Gabrielle Chamberland
- 2013-14: Danielle Lumley
- 2014-15: Edith Noblecilla
- 2015-16: Noemie Hamel-Petit
- 2016-17: Edith Noblecilla
- 2017-18: Edith Noblecilla
- 2018-19: Metchline Gabelus
- 2019-20: Amaiquen Siciliano

=== RSEQ Awards ===
- 2017-18 RSEQ Coach of the Year: Craig Norman

==== Rookie of the Year ====
- 2019-20 RSEQ Rookie of the Year: Jael Kabunda
- 2002-03: Anouk Boulanger
- 1996-97 Cynthia Hitchcock
- 1994-95: Nicky Walsh

==== RSEQ All-Stars ====
First Team

- 2019-20: Jael Kabunda

Second Team

==== All-Rookie Team ====
- 2019-20 Deborah Aboagaye
- 2019-20 Jael Kabunda
- 2019-20 Jennifer Louis
- 2018-19 Amaiquen Siciliano
- 2017-18: Marie Berrouette
- 2016-17: Metchline Gabelus
- 2015-16: Ashley Milhomme
- 2015-16: Charlene Pettigrew
- 2014-15: Noemie Hamel-Petit
- 2013-14: Mara Lis Marchizotti
- 2013-14: Naomie Zitt-James
- 2011-12: Veronique Fortin-Tremblay
- 2011-12: Eloisa Katz
- 2010-11: Gabrielle Chamberland
- 2010-11: Bailey Trafford
- 2009-10: Bethan Chalke

==== Statistical leaders ====
- 1971-72 QUAA now known as RSEQ Scoring leader: Nancy Knowlton
- 1972-73 QUAA Scoring leader: Nancy Knowlton

=== U Sports Awards ===
- 2019-20 Kathy Shields Award: Jael Kabunda
- 2003-04 Coach of the Year: Craig Norman
- 1983-84 Peter Ennis Award: Wayne Hussey
- 1983-84 Nan Copp Award: Andrea Blackwell
- 1980-81 Peter Ennis Award: Wayne Hussey

==== U Sports championship MVP ====
- 1983-84 (tie) Andrea Blackwell and Lynn Polson
- 1982-83 Andrea Blackwell
- 1977-78 Debbie Huband

==== All-Canadians ====
- 1980-81 All-Canadian: Sue Hylland
- 1982-83 All-Canadian: Andrea Blackwell
- 1982-83 All-Canadian: Lynn Polson
- 1983-84 All-Canadian: Andrea Blackwell
- 1983-84 All-Canadian: Lynn Polson

=== Top 100 ===
In celebration of the centennial anniversary of U SPORTS women's basketball, a committee of U SPORTS women's basketball coaches and partners revealed a list of the Top 100 women's basketball players. Commemorating the 100th anniversary of the first Canadian university women's contest between the Queen's Gaels and McGill Martlets on Feb. 6, 1920, the list of the Top 100 was gradually revealed over four weeks. Culminating with the All-Canadian Gala, which also recognized national award winners.

Player	Team(s)	Years	Accolades
Debbie Huband	Bishop's; Concordia	1976-80	Captained Bishop's to three consecutive QUAA titles from 1977 to 1980; Played for Canada in Basketball at the 1984 Summer Olympics; Set a Canada West record with 344 coaching wins with the UBC Thunderbirds women's basketball program
Andrea Blackwell	Bishop's	1979-84	Played for Canada in Basketball at the 1984 Summer Olympics
Lynn Polson	Bishop's	1980-84	Played for Canada in Basketball at the 1984 Summer Olympics; Won a bronze medal for Canada at the 1986 FIBA World Championship for Women
Cynthia Johnston	Bishop's	1986-91	Played for Canada in Basketball at the 1996 Summer Olympics; Female Athlete of the Year at Bishop's University
