= 1981 in basketball =

The following are the basketball events of the year 1981 throughout the world.

Basketball competitions taking place in 1981

== Winners of major team competitions 1980–1981 ==
=== Men ===
- Intercontinental Cup : Real Madrid

Europe

- West Germany : Saturn Cologne
- East Germany : BSG AdW Berlin
- Belgium : Sunair Oostende
- Bulgaria : Levski Sofia
- European Champions Cup : Maccabi Tel Aviv
- Cup Winners' Cup : Pallacanestro Cantù
- Korać Cup : Joventut Badalona
- Spain : FC Barcelona
- France : ASVEL Basket
- Greece : Panathinaikos
- Iceland : UMFN Njardvík
- Israel : Maccabi Tel Aviv
- Italy : Pallacanestro Cantù
- Netherlands : Nashua
- Poland : Śląsk Wrocław
- Switzerland : Fribourg Olympic
- Czechoslovakia : USK Praha
- Turkey : Eczacibasi
- USSR : CSKA Moscow
- Yugoslavia : Partizan Belgrade

Americas

- CBA : Rochester Zeniths
- South American Championships : Ferro Carril Oeste
- NBA : Boston Celtics
- NCAA : Indiana Hoosiers
- Venezuela : Guaiqueríes de Margarita

Africa, Asia, Oceania

- Angola : CD 1° de Agosto
- Australia : Launceston Casino City
- FIBA Africa Clubs Champions Cup : AS Forces Armées
- Tunisia : Étoile sportive du Sahel

=== Women ===
Europe

- West Germany : DJK Agon 08 Düsseldorf
- European Champions Cup : TTT Riga
- Ronchetti Cup : Spartak Moscow
- Spain : Club Comansi Barcelona
- France : Clermont UC
- Italy : Pagnossin Treviso
- Poland : Wisła Kraków
- Czechoslovakia : Sparta Prague
- USSR : TTT Riga

Africa, Asia, Oceania

- Senegal : ASCC BOPP

== Player awards (NBA) ==
=== Regular season MVP ===
- Julius Erving, Philadelphia 76ers

=== NBA Finals MVP ===
- Cedric Maxwell, Boston Celtics

== Naismith Memorial Basketball Hall of Fame ==
- Class of 1981:
  - Tom Barlow
  - Arad McCutchan
  - Ferenc Hepp
  - J. Walter Kennedy

== Deaths ==
- January 1 — Matt Vaniel, American professional player (born 1919)
- January 5 — Joe Dolhon, American professional player (born 1927)
- January 9 — Tommy Byrnes, American professional player (born 1923)
- January 10 — Chink Crossin, American professional player (born 1923)
- January 22 — Russ Wilkins, American professional player (born 1923)
- January 31 — Dick Edwards, American college coach (born 1930)
- February 7 — Connie Kunzmann, American professional player (born 1956)
- February 26 — Bud Lindberg, American professional player (born 1909)
- April 3 — Willis Young, American professional player (born 1911)
- June 7 — Ian Watson, Australian Olympic player (born 1949)
- June 20 — Rock Norman, American college coach (born 1892)
- June 23 — Lou Spicer, American professional player (born 1922)
- July 3 — Artūras Andrulis, Lithuanian national team player (born 1922)
- July 25 — Bobby Anet, college All-American and national champion (Oregon) (born 1917)
- August 6 — Jack Harvey, college All-American and AAU player (born 1918)
- September 4 — Carl Knowles, American Olympic gold medalist (1936) (born 1910)
- September 10 — John Lance, American college coach (born 1897)
- September 16 — John Azary, American college and professional player (born 1929)
- November 8 — George Nostrand, American professional player (born 1924)

== See also ==
- 1981 in sports
