= Windsor Lancers women's basketball =

Women's college basketball team

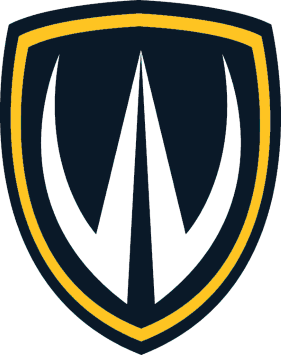
- University: University of Windsor
- Head coach: Chantal Vallée
- Location: Windsor, Ontario
- Conference: Ontario University Athletics
- Nickname: Lancers
- Colors: Blue and gold

Conference tournament champions
- 2009, 2010, 2011, 2013, 2014, 2015

The Windsor Lancers women's basketball team represent the University of Windsor in the Ontario University Athletics conference of U Sports women's basketball. Having won the Bronze Baby for five consecutive years (2011–15), the most recent championship victory occurred at the 2015 CIS Women's Basketball Championship.

== History ==
The Windsor Lancers women's basketball program, led by Head Coach Chantal Vallée, a native of Montreal, has become one of the top women's basketball programs in the country, having capturing five consecutive CIS national titles in 2011, 2012, 2013, 2014, and 2015.

In 2008–09, Vallée and the Lancers made history as she led her team to a 21–1 record, their first ever OUA Provincial Championship title and a trip to the CIS National Championships in Saskatchewan, where they finished fourth. In 2010–11, the Lancers won their first ever CIS National Championship title in the program's 50th year. With a 20–2 regular season record, the Lancers were ranked in the top two in the CIS Top Ten all year long and claimed their third straight OUA Provincial Championship. At Nationals, her Lancer squad defeated the Quebec champion Laval Rouge et Or, the AUS champion Cape Breton Capers and the Canada West champion Saskatchewan Huskies to claim the CIS National Championship. With the win, the Lancers became the first host school to ever win a CIS national championship title in women's basketball at home and were also the first team outside of the Canada West Conference to win the Bronze Baby Trophy in the last 19 years.

In 2011–12, Coach Vallée and the Lancer women's basketball team captured their second straight CIS national title with a 69–53 over the second seeded UBC Thunderbirds. Ranked fourth heading into the national tournament, the Lancers defended their 2011 title by defeating AUS champion Acadia in the quarter-final, host Calgary in the semi, and the Canada West winner Thunderbirds to take the Bronze Baby back to Windsor.

In 2012–13, Vallée's squad made program history as they completed an undefeated regular season with a 21–0 record and the No. 1 ranking in Canada. It was the first time in OUA women's basketball history that a team has gone undefeated since moving away from the 12-game schedule and placed first overall in the OUA west division for the fourth consecutive year. In the playoffs, Windsor became only the fourth team in CIS women's basketball history to capture three straight CIS national titles. Coach Vallée's Lancer squad held off Carleton to win their fourth provincial title in five years, and capped off their undefeated season at the national championships with a convincing win over the host Regina Rams in the gold medal game.

In 2013–14, Coach Vallée led her team to an incredible fourth straight CIS national championship title, winning at home for the second time in four years. The Lancers finished the regular season with a sparkling 21–1 record and the No. 1 ranking in Canada. After capturing their fifth OUA title in six seasons, the Lancers knocked off Laurier, Fraser Valley and Saint Mary's to capture the prestigious Bronze Baby trophy as national champions for the fourth consecutive year. In 2014–15, the Lancers won a historic fifth straight CIS national championship. They finished with an impressive 19–1 conference record and their sixth OUA title in the past seven seasons. Ranked #1 heading into nationals, the Lancers knocked off Laval, Saskatchewan, and McGill to make history and claim their fifth consecutive Bronze Baby trophy as national champions, becoming only the second team in CIS history to do so. The Lancers extended their CIS post-season win streak to 21–0 and Chantal Vallee was honoured as the CIS women's basketball coach of the year for the second consecutive season.

In 2014–15, the Lancers won a historic fifth straight CIS national championship. They finished with an impressive 19–1 conference record and their sixth OUA title in the past seven seasons. Ranked #1 heading into nationals, the Lancers knocked off Laval, Saskatchewan, and McGill to make history and claim their fifth consecutive Bronze Baby trophy as national champions, becoming only the second team in CIS history to do so. The Lancers extended their CIS post-season win streak to 21–0 and Chantal Vallee was honoured as the CIS women's basketball coach of the year for the second consecutive season.

Miah-Marie Langlois played 5 years for the Windsor Lancers before turning professional. She also became an Olympian and competed in the 2016 Rio Olympics.

In March 2020, Lancers basketball alumnae Jessica Clemencon, Miah-Marie Langlois and Korissa Williams were named to the list of the Top 100 U Sports Women's Basketball Players of the Century (2011–2020).

=== Individual Leader Scoring ===
Legend
GP	Games played	GS	Games started	MIN	Minutes played
FG	Field-goals	3FG	3-point field-goals	FT	Free-throws
PTS	Points	AVG	Points per game

Season	Player	GP	Min	FG	3FG	FT	Pts	Avg	OUA rank
2012-13	Jessica Clemencon	21	581	139	0	97	375	17.9	2nd
2011-12	Jessica Clemencon	21	590	144	0	89	377	18.0	3rd
2010-11	Jessica Clemencon	22	679	150	0	119	419	19.0	1st
2009-10	Jessica Clemencon	20	593	112	0	113	337	16.9	4th

== U Sports Elite 8 results ==
Year	Seed	Round	Opponent	Result
2011		First Round; Semi-Finals; Finals	Laval Rouge et Or; Cape Breton Capers; Saskatchewan Huskies	W 80-50; W 56-47; W 63-49
2012		First Round; Semi-Finals; Finals	Acadia Axewomen; Calgary Dinos; UBC Thunderbirds	W 94-46; W 81-71; W 69–53
2013		First Round; Semi-Finals; Finals	Ottawa Gee-Gees; Calgary Dinos; Regina Cougars	W 56-46; W 82-65; W 66–57
2014		First Round; Semi-Finals; Finals	Laurier Golden Hawks; Fraser Valley Cascades; Saint Mary's Huskies	W 81-53; W 65-45; W 71-45
2015	#1	First Round; Semi-Finals; Finals	#8 Laval Rouge et Or #4 Saskatchewan Huskies #3 McGill Martlets	W 91–57; W 75–61; W 60–47

== International ==
- Miah-Marie Langlois Canada: 2015 Pan American Games (gold)
- Korissa Williams Canada: 2015 Summer Universiade
- Raelyn Prince Canada : 2011 Pan American Games

== Awards and honors ==
- Chantal Vallée, 2016 CAAWS Women of Influence Award
- 2017 Windsor Lancers Alumni Sports Hall of Fame Class: Dranadia Roc

=== University honors ===
- Kayah Clarke, 2017 Windsor Lancers Athletics Female Rookie of the Year
- Emily Prevost, 2018 The Captain's Trophy
- Carly Steer, 2019 Windsor Lancers Female Athlete of the Year

=== OUA Awards ===
- 2011-12 OUA West Player of the Year : Jessica Clemencon
- 2010-11 OUA Player of the Year: Jessica Clemencon
- 2009-10 OUA West Rookie of the Year: Jessica Clemencon
- 2009-10 OUA West All-Rookie Team member: Jessica Clemencon
- 2016-17 OUA Rookie of the Year: Kayah Clarke

==== OUA All-Stars ====
First Team

- 2016-17 First Team: Emily Prevost
- 2012-13 OUA First Team all-star : Jessica Clemencon
- 2011-12 OUA First Team all-star : Jessica Clemencon
- 2010-11 OUA First Team all-star : Jessica Clemencon

Second Team

- 2016-17 Second Team: Cheyanne Roger

==== OUA All-Rookie ====
- 2016-17 OUA All-Rookie Team: Kayah Clarke

==== OUA Women’s Basketball Showcase ====
- 2018 Showcase Participant: Tyra Blizzard (named to Team Burns)

=== U Sports Awards ===
- Jessica Clemencon, 2010 Kathy Shields Award
- Jessica Clemencon, 2011 BLG Awards
- Jessica Clemencon, 2011 Nan Copp Award
- Korissa Williams, 2015 BLG Awards
- 2009-10 CIS All-Rookie Team Member: Jessica Clemencon
- 2009-10 CIS Rookie of the Year: Jessica Clemencon

=== All-Canadians ===
- 2012-13 CIS Second Team All-Canadian: Jessica Clemencon
- 2011-12 CIS All-Canadian: Jessica Clemencon

==== U Sports Nationals ====
- 2013 CIS National Championships Most Valuable Player: Korissa Williams
- 2015 CIS National Championships Most Valuable Player: Korissa Williams
- 2010-11 CIS First Team All-Canadian: Jessica Clemencon

BLG USports Athlete of the Year

- Jessica Clemencon 2011
- Korissa Williams 2015

== Top 100 ==
In celebration of the centennial anniversary of U SPORTS women's basketball, a committee of U SPORTS women's basketball coaches and partners revealed a list of the Top 100 women's basketball players. Commemorating the 100th anniversary of the first Canadian university women's contest between the Queen's Gaels and McGill Martlets on Feb. 6, 1920, the list of the Top 100 was gradually revealed over four weeks. Culminating with the All-Canadian Gala, which also recognized national award winners. A total of three Windsor players were named to the list.

Player	Years	Accolades
Jessica Clemencon	2009-14	Winner of the 2010 Kathy Shields Award; Recipient of the 2011 Nan Copp Award; Won the 2011 Lieutenant Governor Athletic Awards
Miah-Marie Langlois	2009-14	Three-time winner of the CIS Defensive Player of the Year (2012, 2013, 2014); Most Valuable Player of the 2011, 2012 and 2014 CIS National Championship; Played professionally for WBC Dynamo Novosibirsk; Won gold medal for Canada in Basketball at the 2015 Pan American Games; Also won gold medal for Canada in 2015 FIBA Americas Women's Championship and at the 2017 FIBA Women's AmeriCup; Played for Canada in Basketball at the 2016 Summer Olympics
Korissa Williams	2010-15	Most Valuable Player of the 2013 and 2015 CIS National Championships; Won the 2015 Lieutenant Governor Athletic Awards

== Lancers in pro basketball ==
Player	Position	Team(s)	League(s)	Years	Titles
Jessica Clemencon		Angers Basket 49; COB Calais	Ligue Féminine de Basketball		
Miah-Marie Langlois	Point guard	WBC Dynamo Novosibirsk	Russian Women's Basketball Premier League		
Raelyn Prince		Wolfenbüttel Wildcats	Damen-Basketball-Bundesliga		
Iva Peklova		Armita Praha	Czech Women's Basketball League		
Dranadia Roc		Valur	Úrvalsdeild kvenna		
