= 1987–88 Galatasaray S.K. (women's basketball) season =

Galatasaray Medical Park
1987-1988 season
- Chairman: (Turkey) Ali Tanrıyar
- Manager: (Turkey) Fehmi Sadıkoğlu
- Turkish Basketball League: 1st

Galatasaray SK. women's 1987–1988 season is the 1987–1988 basketball season for Turkish professional basketball club Galatasaray Medical Park.

The club competes in the Turkish Women's Basketball League.

== Depth chart ==
Pos.	Starting 5	Bench
C	Pınar Baysan	Soley Zaman
PF	Zeynep Gül Ene	Filiz Şahin
SF	Tülin Artır	Özlem Pala
SG	Canan Bakır	Nil Erayda
PG	Müge Koldaş	Müge Teker

== Results, schedules and standings ==
=== Turkish Basketball League 1987–88 ===
==== Regular season ====
===== First half =====
November 7, 1987
15:00 TSI

[ (Report)]

Galatasaray	61–40	Beşiktaş

Spor Sergi Sarayı, Istanbul
Attendance: unknown

November 14, 1987
15:00 TSI

[ (Report)]

Galatasaray	80–57	Yükselişspor

Spor Sergi Sarayı, Istanbul
Attendance: none

November 15, 1987
15:00 TSI

[ (Report)]

Galatasaray	87–45	Ormanspor

Spor Sergi Sarayı, Istanbul
Attendance: none

November 21, 1987
16:00 TSI

[ (Report)]

İzmirspor	50–76	Galatasaray

-
Attendance: none

November 22, 1987
16:00 TSI

[ (Report)]

Sanyospor	56–107	Galatasaray

-
Attendance: none

November 27, 1987
16:00 TSI

[ (Report)]

Galatasaray	102–38	DSİ Nilüferspor

Spor Sergi Sarayı, Istanbul
Attendance: none

November 28, 1987
16:15 TSI

[ (Report)]

İÜBK	52–80	Galatasaray

-
Attendance: none

December 12, 1987
13:30 TSI

[ (Report)]

Galatasaray	64–51	DSİ

Spor Sergi Sarayı, Istanbul
Attendance: none

December 13, 1987
13:30 TSI

[ (Report)]

Galatasaray	52–42	MTA SK

Spor Sergi Sarayı, Istanbul
Attendance: none

December 27, 1987
16:15 TSI

[ (Report)]

Seka Kağıtspor	53–65	Galatasaray
Scoring by half: 33–29, 20–36
Pts: Jasna 19, Serpil 12		Pts: Zeynep Gül 12, Müge 12, Pınar 25

-
Attendance: none
Referees: Nusret Eryılmaz, Metin Yılmaz

December 28, 1987
16:15 TSI

[ (Report)]

Lassaspor	59–83	Galatasaray
Scoring by half: 17–37, 42–46
Pts: Nurgül 29, Hülya 10		Pts: Zeynep Gül 20, Tülin 20, Pınar 16, Canan 11, Özlem 10

-
Attendance: none
Referees: Yalçın Gürpınar, Mermi Süzenler

===== Second half =====
January 24, 1988
15:00 TSI

[ (Report)]

Galatasaray	53–41	Beşiktaş

Spor Sergi Sarayı, Istanbul
Attendance: unknown

February 6, 1988
16:15 TSI

[ (Report)]

Yükselişspor	33–62	Galatasaray

-
Attendance: none

February 7, 1988
16:15 TSI

[ (Report)]

Ormanspor	47–63	Galatasaray

-
Attendance: none

February 27, 1987
15:00 TSI

[ (Report)]

Galatasaray	84–46	İzmirspor

Spor Sergi Sarayı, Istanbul
Attendance: unknown

February 28, 1987
15:00 TSI

[ (Report)]

Galatasaray	110–38	Sanyospor

Spor Sergi Sarayı, Istanbul
Attendance: unknown

March 20, 1988
16:15 TSI

[ (Report)]

MTA SK	47–56	Galatasaray

-
Attendance: none

March 29, 1988
15:00 TSI

[ (Report)]

Galatasaray	62–54	Lassaspor
Scoring by half: 36–31, 26–23
Pts: Zeynep Gül 19, Soley 12		Pts: Şahver 14, Nurgül 13

Spor Sergi Sarayı, Istanbul
Attendance: unknown

April 9, 1988
15:00 TSI

[ (Report)]

Galatasaray	49–48	İÜBK

Spor Sergi Sarayı, Istanbul
Attendance: unknown
