= Liburdi =

Liburdi is an Italian surname. Notable people with the surname include:

- Maryse Liburdi, American businesswoman
- Mauro Liburdi (born 1982), Italian basketball player
- Michael T. Liburdi (born 1977), American judge
