= 1980 in basketball =

The following are the basketball events of the year 1980 throughout the world.

== International competitions ==
=== Men's national teams ===
==== Senior ====
- 20 – 30 July: 1980 Olympic Tournament at Moscow, Soviet Union
  - (gold) Yugoslavia
  - (silver) Italy
  - (bronze) Soviet Union
- 18 – 25 March: 1980 FIBA Americas Championship at San Juan, Puerto Rico
  - (gold) Puerto Rico
  - (silver) Canada
  - (bronze) Argentina
- 22 – 28 March: FIBA Africa Championship 1980 at Rabat, Morocco
  - (gold) Senegal
  - (silver) Ivory Coast
  - (bronze) Morocco

==== Youth ====
- 22 – 30 August: 1980 FIBA Europe Under-18 Championship at Celje, Yugoslavia
  - (gold) Soviet Union
  - (silver) Yugoslavia
  - (bronze) Bulgaria

=== Women's national teams ===
==== Senior ====
- 20 – 30 July: 1980 Olympic Tournament at Moscow, Soviet Union
  - (gold) Soviet Union
  - (silver) Bulgaria
  - (bronze) Yugoslavia
- 13 – 21 September: 1980 FIBA Asia Championship at Hong Kong
  - (gold) South Korea
  - (silver) China
  - (bronze) Japan
- 19 – 28 September: 1980 EuroBasket at Yugoslavia
  - (gold) Soviet Union
  - (silver) Poland
  - (bronze) Yugoslavia

==== Youth ====
- 6 – 14 March: 1980 FIBA Europe Under-16 Championship at Hungary
  - (gold) Soviet Union
  - (silver) Italy
  - (bronze) Bulgaria

== Club competitions ==
=== Continental championships ===
Men

Region	Tournament	Champion	Runner-up	Final/Series result
FIBA	1980 FIBA Intercontinental Cup	(Israel) Maccabi Tel Aviv	(Brazil) AA Francana	—
FIBA Americas	1980 Campeonato Sudamericano de Clubes	(Brazil) AA Francana	(Brazil) E.C. Sírio	—
FIBA Europe	1979–80 FIBA European Champions Cup	(Spain) Real Madrid	(Israel) Maccabi Tel Aviv	89–85
FIBA Europe	1979–80 FIBA European Cup Winners' Cup	(Italy) Emerson Varese	(Italy) Gabetti Cantù	90–88
FIBA Europe	1979–80 FIBA Korać Cup	(Italy) Sebastiani Rieti	(Socialist Federal Republic of Yugoslavia) Cibona Zagreb	76–71

Women

Region	Tournament	Champion	Runner-up	Final/Series result
FIBA Europe	1979–80 FIBA European Champions Cup	(Italy) Sisport Fiat Turin	(Bulgaria) Minyor Pernik	75–66
FIBA Europe	1979–80 Ronchetti Cup	(Socialist Federal Republic of Yugoslavia) Montmontaža Zagreb	(Bulgaria) DFS Maritza Plovdiv	82–76

=== Domestic championships ===
Country/Region	Tournament	Champion	Runner-up	Final/Series result	Regular season MVP	Finals MVP
Albania	1980 Albanian Basketball League	Partizani Tirana	–			
Albania	1980 Albanian Basketball Cup	Partizani Tirana	–			
Algeria	Algerian Basketball Championship	Darak El-Watani	–			
Algeria	Algerian Basketball Cup	Darak El-Watani	CS DNC Alger	88–78	–	
Angola	BAI Basket	Desportivo da TAAG	–			
Australia	1980 National Basketball League	St Kilda Saints	West Adelaide Bearcats	113–88	Mike Jones	–
Belgium	1980 Belgian Basketball League	Racing Club Mechelen	–			
Belgium	1979–80 Belgian Basketball Cup	SFX Verviers	Sunair Oostende	73–72	–	
Brazil	Campeonato Brasileiro de Basquete	Franca B.C.	–			
Bulgaria	1979–80 National Basketball League	CSKA Sofia	–			
Bulgaria	Bulgarian Cup	CSKA Sofia	–			
Cyprus	1979–80 Cyprus Division 1	AEL Limassol	–			
Cyprus	1980 Cypriot Basketball Cup	AEL Limassol	–			
Czechoslovakia	1979–80 Czechoslovak Basketball League	Inter Slovnaft	–			
Finland	1979–80 Korisliiga	Pantterit	–			
Finland	1980 Finnish Basketball Cup	Torpan Pojat	–			
Greece	1979–80 A National Category	Panathinaikos	–			
Greece	1980 Greek Basketball Cup	Olympiacos	A.E.K. Athens	85–80	–	
Iceland	1979–80 Premier League	Valur	–			
Israel	1979–80 Israeli Basketball Premier League	Maccabi Tel Aviv	Hapoel Tel Aviv	–		
Israel	1979–80 Israeli Basketball State Cup	Maccabi Tel Aviv	Hapoel Ramat Gan	105–87	–	
Italy	1979–80 Lega Basket Serie A	Sinudyne Bologna	Gabetti Cantù	2–0	–	
Luxembourg	1979–80 Diekirch League	BBC Amicale Steinsel	–			
Netherlands	1979–80 Eredivisie	Nashua Den Bosch	Parker Leiden	2–0	Kees Akerboom, Sr.	–
Netherlands	1979–80 NBB-Beker	PSV Almonte Eindhoven	–			
Paraguay	1980 Paraguayan Metropolitan Basketball League	Olimpia	–			
Poland	1979–80 Polish Basketball League	Śląsk Wrocław	–			
Poland	1979–80 Polish Cup	Śląsk Wrocław	–			
Portugal	1979–80 Liga Portuguesa de Basquetebol	F.C. Porto	–			
Puerto Rico	1979–80 Baloncesto Superior Nacional	Mets de Guaynabo	Piratas de Quebradillas	–		
Romania	1979–80 Liga Națională	Steaua București	–			
Soviet Union	1979–80 Soviet Union National League	CSKA Moscow	–			
Spain	1979–80 Liga Española de Baloncesto	Real Madrid	FC Barcelona	–		
Spain	1979–80 Copa del Rey de Baloncesto	FC Barcelona	Real Madrid	106–90	–	
Switzerland	1979–80 Ligue Nationale de Basket	AS Viganello	–			
Tunisia	1979–80 Tunisian Division I	Espérance Sportive de Tunis	–			
Tunisia	1979–80 Tunisian Basketball Cup	Stade Nabeulien	–			
Turkey	1979–80 Turkish Basketball League	Eczacıbaşı	Efes Pilsen	–		
United States	1979–80 Continental Basketball Association	Anchorage Northern Knights	Rochester Zeniths	4–0	–	
United States	1979–80 National Basketball Association	Los Angeles Lakers	Philadelphia 76ers	4–2	Kareem Abdul-Jabbar	Magic Johnson
Philippines	1980 PBA Open Conference	U/Tex Wranglers; Crispa Redmanizers; Nicholas Stoodley	Toyota Tamaraws; Toyota Tamaraws; Toyota Tamaraws	–	Philip Cezar	–
Philippines	1980 PBA All-Filipino Conference	Crispa Redmanizers	Toyota Tamaraws	–		
Venezuela	1980 Liga Profesional de Baloncesto	Guaiqueríes de Margarita	Retadores de Caracas	4–3	–	
West Germany	1979–80 Basketball Bundesliga	ASC 1846 Göttingen	–			
West Germany	1980 German Basketball Cup	BSC Saturn 1977 Köln	–			
(Socialist Federal Republic of Yugoslavia) Yugoslavia	1979–80 Yugoslav First Federal League	Bosna	–			
(Socialist Federal Republic of Yugoslavia) Yugoslavia	1979–80 Yugoslav Basketball Cup	Cibona Zagreb	Bosna	68–62	–	

== Naismith Memorial Basketball Hall of Fame inductions ==
- Lester Harrison, contributor
- Jerry Lucas, player
- Oscar Robertson, player
- Everett Shelton, coach
- Dallas Shirley, referee
- Jerry West, player

== Births ==
- February 28 — Tayshaun Prince
- March 13 — Caron Butler
- March 15 — Yannick Gagneur
- March 16 — Felipe Reyes
- April 15 — Raül López
- April 23 — Rohanee Cox
- April 30 — Luis Scola
- May 30 — Ilona Korstin
- June 7 — Berni Rodríguez
- June 9 — Udonis Haslem
- June 13 — Juan Carlos Navarro
- June 14 — Elena Karpova
- June 21 — Richard Jefferson
- June 21 — Federico Kammerichs
- July 6 — Pau Gasol
- July 9 — Svetlana Abrosimova
- August 1 — Asjha Jones
- September 12 — Yao Ming
- October 16 — Sue Bird
- December 16 — Natalie Porter
- December 17 — Suzy Batkovic

== Deaths ==
- February 5 — Skinny Johnson, American Hall of Fame college (Kansas) and AAU player (born 1911)
- February 29 — Doug Kistler, American NBA player (born 1938)
- April 22 — Decio Scuri, Italian Olympic coach and FIBA executive (born March 18)
- May 5 — Stewart Way, American NCAA coach (born 1911)
- May 23 — Terry Furlow, American NBA player (born 1954)
- June 12 — Johnny Horan, American NBA and EPBL player (born 1916)
- August 19 — Sadi Gülçelik, Turkish club and Olympic player (born 1930)
- October 4 — Sihugo Green, American NBA player (born 1933)
- October 27 — Art Hillhouse, American NBA player (born 1916)
- November 14 — Johnny Horan, American NBA player (born 1932)
- November 25 — Joe Cipriano, American college coach (Idaho, Nebraska) (born 1931)
- November 27 — Ferenc Hepp, Hungarian FIBA executive (born 1909)
- November 30 — Mieko Fukui, Japanese Olympic player (born 1956)
- December 5 — Eddie Hickey, Hall of Fame American college coach (Creighton, Saint Louis, Marquette) (born 1902)
- December 19 — Tarzan Cooper, American Hall of Fame player (New York Renaissance) (born 1907)

== See also ==
- 1980 in sports
