= Patinoire des Vernets =

Indoor arena in Geneva, Switzerland

- Les Vernets
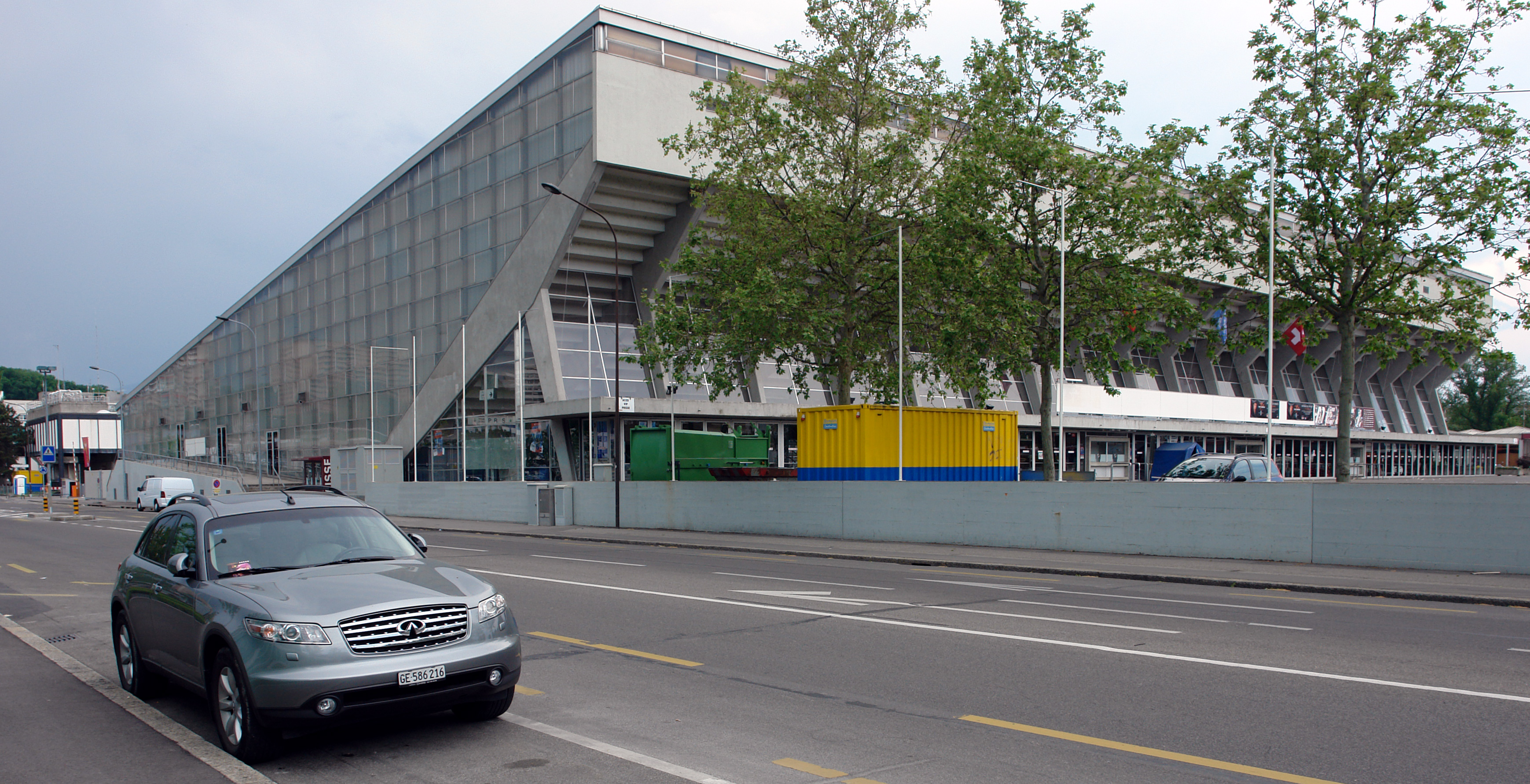
- Interactive map of Patinoire des Vernets
- Full name: Patinoire des Vernets
- Location: Rue Hans Wilsdorf 4, Acacias, GE, 1227, Switzerland
- Coordinates: 46.1944°N 6.133°E
- Capacity: 7,135 (Ice Hockey)
- Record attendance: 11,820 (1958–59 Cup Final)
- Field size: 69,55m x 38,60m

Construction
- Opened: November 28, 1958
- Renovated: 1992, 2009
- Expanded: 2009
- Architects: Cingria, Maurice and Duret

Tenant
- Genève-Servette HC (NL) (1958–present)

Patinoire des Vernets is an indoor arena located in Geneva, Switzerland. It is primarily used for ice hockey and is the home arena of Genève-Servette HC. Opened in 1958, it has a seating capacity for 7,135 people.

== History ==
When it opened in 1958, the arena had a total of 11,820 spectators. In 1992 a renovation took place, which reduced the capacity to 6,837 places. In 2009 a further modernization took place, whereby more seats were created and the audience capacity rose to 7,202.

The arena hosted the 1962 FIBA Champions Cup final in which Dynamo Tbilisi of Georgia (then Soviet Georgia) defeated Real Madrid 90–83. The 1976 and 1984 finals of the same competition was also hosted at the arena. Patinoire des Vernets also hosted the 1991 FIBA Saporta Cup final.

== See also ==
- List of indoor arenas in Switzerland

Preceded by Two legged final	FIBA European Champions Cup; Final Venue; 1962	Succeeded by Two legged Final
Preceded by Sporthal Arena; Antwerp	FIBA European Champions Cup; Final Venue; 1976	Succeeded by Pionir Hall; Belgrade
Preceded by Palais des Sports; Grenoble	FIBA European Champions Cup; Final Venue; 1984	Succeeded by Peace and Friendship Stadium; Athens
Preceded by Palasport di Firenze; Florence	FIBA European Cup Winners' Cup; Final Venue; 1991	Succeeded by Palais des Sports de Beaulieu; Nantes
