= Laurentian Voyageurs women's basketball =

Women's college basketball team

- University: Laurentian University
- Head coach: Jason Hurley (14th season)
- Location: Sudbury, Ontario
- Arena: Ben F. Avery Gymnasium
- Conference: OUA
- Nickname: Voyageurs
- Colors: Gold and blue

Conference tournament champions
- 1975, 1976, 1977, 1978, 1979, 1981, 1987, 1990, 1991, 1992, 1993, 1995, 1998, 2000

Uniforms
Home	Away

The Laurentian Voyageurs women's basketball team represents Laurentian University in U Sports women's basketball as a member of Ontario University Athletics (OUA). The Voyageurs have captured the Ontario provincial title a total of 14 times, the last coming in 2000. Additionally, the program has won seven Bronze Baby trophies as national champions in 1975–79, and in 1990 and 1991.

== History ==
=== 705 Challenge Cup ===
The two Northern Ontario universities of Laurentian and Nipissing University have long been soccer rivals, competing annually for the Riley Gallo Cup, named after the late son of the former Laurentian women's soccer coach Rob Gallo. The two universities introduced the 705 Challenge Cup in 2016, decided by the overall win–loss record of all regular-season games between their varsity teams for men's and women's basketball, ice hockey and soccer. Laurentian won the first three cups, and Nipissing won its first cup during the 2019–20 season with a 64–55 women's basketball win over the Voyageurs on January 17, 2020. The following table reflects the women's basketball matchups in the 2018–19 and 2019–20 seasons.

Nipissing victories	Laurentian victories	Tie games

No.	Date	Location	Winning team		Losing team	
1	October 26, 2018	Sudbury	Laurentian	86	Nipissing	60
2	February 1, 2019	North Bay	Laurentian	75	Nipissing	64
3	November 10, 2019	Sudbury	Laurentian	71	Nipissing	69
4	January 17, 2020	North Bay	Nipissing	64	Laurentian	55
Series: Laurentian leads 3–1

=== Season-by-season record ===
Season	W	L	Pct.	PF	PA	OUA finish (Note: Overall placing in the OUA standings by winning percentage; division placing is also shown where OUA used divisions)
2025–26	13	9	.591	1436	1421	8th of 18; 3rd, East
2024–25	7	15	.318	1305	1392	12th of 18 (tied); 4th, East
2023–24	6	16	.273	1271	1479	12th of 18; 4th, East
2022–23	9	13	.409	1272	1358	11th of 18 (tied); 4th, East
2021–22	6	8	.429	827	972	11th of 18
2020–21	No season (COVID-19)					
2019–20	3	19	.136	1299	1598	16th of 18 (tied)
2018–19	7	16	.304	1451	1587	12th of 17
2017–18	5	18	.217	1367	1698	14th of 17
2016–17	4	15	.211	1076	1304	15th of 17
2015–16	3	16	.158	1111	1297	14th of 17 (tied)
2014–15	8	11	.421	1142	1312	10th of 17 (tied)
2013–14	4	18	.182	1145	1385	14th of 16
2012–13	5	15	.250	1174	1409	14th of 15
2011–12	4	18	.182	1051	1387	14th of 16
2010–11	5	17	.227	1335	1493	14th of 16
2009–10	12	10	.545	1455	1407	9th of 16 (tied)

=== Individual scoring leaders ===
Season	Player	GP	Min	FG	3FG	FT	Pts	PPG	OUA rank (Note: Laurentian's leading scorer each season by points per game; OUA rank is the player's rank among OUA scorers by points per game, where available)
2025–26	Claudia Pellerin	19	615	107	17	97	328	17.3	6th
2024–25	Emilie Lafond	22	718	156	0	95	407	18.5	3rd
2023–24	Claudia Pellerin	20	546	84	31	63	262	13.1	19th
2022–23	Héléna Lamoureux	18	595	92	24	42	250	13.9	15th
2021–22	Héléna Lamoureux	14	414	59	9	54	181	12.9	14th
2020–21	No season (COVID-19)								
2019–20	Héléna Lamoureux	16	551	84	10	91	269	16.8	5th
2018–19	Emily Tinnes	23	828	91	51	79	312	13.6	11th
2017–18	Emily Tinnes	23	784	96	43	51	286	12.4	12th
2016–17	Emily Tinnes	19	580	65	29	48	207	10.9	27th
2015–16	Danielle Harris	19	586	78	24	76	256	13.5	15th
2014–15	Devenae Bryce	19	432	103	1	62	269	14.2	10th
2013–14	Emma Decloe	22	543	85	0	79	249	11.3	19th
2012–13	Sasha Polishchuk	17	548	113	37	30	293	17.2	3rd
2011–12	Erin Simpson	22	579	78	30	40	226	10.3	31st
2010–11	Lisa Furchner	22	635	132	11	90	365	16.6	3rd
2009–10	Lisa Furchner	21	546	100	3	73	276	13.1	12th

== International ==
Laurentian players who represented Canada in major international competition while playing for the university:

- Anne Hurley Canada 1976 Summer Olympics
- Carol Hamilton-Goodale Canada 1986 FIBA World Championship for Women Bronze

== Awards and honours ==
- Carol Hamilton-Goodale: Basketball Ontario Hall of Fame, Class of 2006 Inductee

=== OUA Awards ===
The following Laurentian players and coaches have received the Ontario women's basketball awards presented by the OUA and, before 1997, its predecessor.

==== Most Valuable Player ====
- Carol Hamilton-Goodale (1984–85, 1986–87)
- Chantal St. Martin (1988–89)
- Dianne Norman (1989–90, 1990–91, 1992–93, 1993–94, 1994–95)
- Susan Stewart (1991–92)
- Stephanie Harrison (1998–99, 1999–2000)
- Shauna Conway (2000–01)
- Clare Beatty (2001–02, 2002–03)
- Cassandra Carpenter (2004–05, 2005–06, 2006–07, 2007–08)

==== Rookie of the Year ====
- Dianne Norman (1989–90)
- Shelley Dewar (1994–95)
- Karen Vos (1995–96)
- Tierney Hoo (2000–01)
- Cassandra Carpenter (2003–04)
- Katie Goggins (2006–07)
- Héléna Lamoureux (2019–20)

==== Coach of the Year ====
- Peter Ennis (1983–84, 1984–85, 1990–91, 1991–92)
- John Campbell (1998–99, 2000–01, 2001–02)
- Mike Clarke (2002–03)

==== All-Star selections ====
- Joy Bellinger: First Team (1980–81, 1983–84), all-star team (1981–82, 1982–83)
- Emily Tinnes: 2018 OUA Women's Basketball All-Star Game
- Kayla Deschatelets, Bailey Tabin: 2019 OUA Women's Basketball Showcase

=== U Sports Awards ===
- Carol Hamilton-Goodale: 1984–85 Nan Copp Award (national player of the year)
- Susan Stewart: 1991–92 Nan Copp Award (national player of the year)

==== All-Canadians ====
Laurentian players named to the national All-Canadian teams:

- Anne Hurley: First Team (1974–75)
- Sheila Strike: First Team (1974–75)
- Sylvia Sweeney: Second Team (1978–79)
- Barb Tucker: First Team (1981–82), Second Team (1982–83)
- Joy Bellinger: Second Team (1983–84)
- Carol Hamilton-Goodale: First Team (1984–85, 1985–86, 1986–87)
- Sandy Stevenson: Second Team (1987–88)
- Dianne Norman: First Team (1993–94, 1994–95), Second Team (1990–91, 1992–93)
- Susan Stewart: First Team (1991–92)
- Stephanie Harrison: First Team (1998–99, 1999–2000), Second Team (1997–98)
- Shauna Conway: Second Team (2000–01)
- Clare Beatty: First Team (2001–02), Second Team (2002–03)
- Cassandra Carpenter: First Team (2004–05, 2005–06, 2007–08), Second Team (2006–07)

==== All-Rookie ====
- Héléna Lamoureux: 2020 U SPORTS Women's Basketball All-Rookie Team

==== Top 100 ====
In 2020, to commemorate the 100th anniversary of the first Canadian university women's contest between the Queen's Gaels and McGill Martlets on February 6, 1920, U Sports named a list of the Top 100 women's basketball players of the century. The selections were made by a committee of coaches and partners. Eight Laurentian players were included in the list:

Player	Team(s)	Years	Laurentian highlights
Kathy Williams-Shields	UBC; Laurentian	1969–71; 1972–76	Member of the 1974–75 and 1975–76 national championship teams
Sylvia Sweeney	McGill; Concordia; Laurentian	1973–79	Member of the 1978–79 national championship team
Chris Critelli	Winnipeg; Laurentian	1974–78	Member of the 1976–77 and 1977–78 national championship teams
Carol Hamilton-Goodale	Laurentian	1984–87	Three-time All-Canadian First Team; national player of the year (1984–85)
Dianne Norman	Laurentian	1989–95	National rookie of the year (1989–90); five-time OUA East MVP; member of the 1989–90 and 1990–91 national championship teams
Susan Stewart	Laurentian	1989–95	National player of the year (1991–92); member of the 1989–90 and 1990–91 national championship teams
Stephanie Harrison	Laurentian	1995–2000	Three-time All-Canadian; OUA East MVP (1998–99, 1999–2000)
Cassandra Carpenter	Laurentian	2003–08	National rookie of the year (2003–04); OUA career scoring record holder (2,171 points, as of 2020)

=== University honours ===
- Héléna Lamoureux: 2020 Laurentian Female Athlete of the Year

==== Laurentian Hall of Fame ====
The following women's basketball teams and individuals have been inducted into Laurentian's athletics hall of fame.

===== Teams =====
- Class of 2014 Inductee: 1975–76 Women's Basketball Team (national and provincial champions)
- Class of 2012 Inductee: 1997–98 Women's Basketball Team (national bronze medallists and provincial champions)
- Class of 2010 Inductee: 1990–91 Women's Basketball Team (national champions)
- Class of 2005 Inductee: 1989–90 Women's Basketball Team (national and provincial champions)
- Class of 1999 Inductee: 1978–79 Women's Basketball Team (national and provincial champions)
- Class of 1994 Inductee: 1974–75 Women's Basketball Team (national and provincial champions)

===== Athletes =====
- Class of 2012 Inductee: Stephanie Dongelmans (Harrison)
- Class of 2010 Inductee: Joy McNichol
- Class of 2008 Inductee: Carolyn Sturgess (Swords)
- Class of 2006 Inductee: Angela MacDonald
- Class of 2005 Inductee: Shirlene McLean
- Class of 2004 Inductee: Kathy Shields
- Class of 2003 Inductee: Susan Stewart
- Class of 2001 Inductee: Dianne Norman
- Class of 1999 Inductee: Sandy Falco (Stevenson)
- Class of 1997 Inductee: Pat Smith
- Class of 1996 Inductee: Joy Louise Bellinger
- Class of 1994 Inductee: Carol Hamilton-Goodale

===== Builders =====
- Class of 1997 Inductee: Norm Vickery
- Class of 1996 Inductee: Peter Ennis
