= Gagneur =

Gagneur is a surname. Notable people with the surname include:

- Marie-Louise Gagneur (1832–1902), French writer and activist
- Yannick Gagneur (born 1980), French basketball player

== See also ==
- Gagner (surname)
- Gagneux
