= Joanne Sargent =

Canadian basketball player

Personal information
- Nationality: Canadian
- Born: 29 October 1948 (age 77) McBride, British Columbia, Canada

Sport
- Sport: Basketball

Joanne Sargent (born 29 October 1948) is a Canadian basketball player. She competed in the women's tournament at the 1976 Summer Olympics. At the university level, she competed for the UBC Thunderbirds women's basketball program.

== Awards and honors ==
- 2014 Inductee: British Columbia Sports Hall of Fame
- 2019 Inductee: Basketball Canada Hall of Fame
- 2019 inductee: Canada West Hall of Fame
