= 1982 in basketball =

The following are the basketball events of the year 1982 throughout the world.

== Player awards (NBA) ==
=== Regular season MVP ===
- Moses Malone, Houston Rockets

=== NBA Finals MVP ===
- Magic Johnson, Los Angeles Lakers

== Collegiate awards ==
- Men
  - John R. Wooden Award: Ralph Sampson, Virginia
  - Frances Pomeroy Naismith Award: Jack Moore, Nebraska
  - Associated Press College Basketball Player of the Year: Ralph Sampson, Virginia
  - NCAA basketball tournament Most Outstanding Player: Akeem Olajuwon, Houston
  - Associated Press College Basketball Coach of the Year: Ralph Miller, Oregon State
  - Naismith Outstanding Contribution to Basketball: Curt Gowdy
- Women
  - Wade Trophy: Pam Kelly, Louisiana Tech

== Naismith Memorial Basketball Hall of Fame ==
- Class of 1982:
  - Everett Case
  - Clarence Gaines
  - Slater Martin
  - Frank Ramsey
  - Willis Reed

== Births ==
- January 6 — Gilbert Arenas
- November 3 — Janel McCarville
- December 6 — Mauro Liburdi

== Deaths ==
- January 5 — Jack Kiley, American NBA player (born 1929)
- January 21 — Jules Bender, American college All-American (Long Island) and original ABL player (born 1914)
- January 21 — Ned Irish, American Hall of Fame president of the New York Knicks (born 1905)
- January 31 — Étienne Onimus, French Olympic player (born 1907)
- February 21 — Jim Bradley, American ABA and CBA player (born 1952)
- April 10 — Vic Hanson, Hall of Fame college player (Syracuse) (born 1903)
- April 27 — Herbert Niiler, Estonian Olympic player (born 1905)
- June 13 — Jim Montgomery, American NBL player (born 1915)
- June 21 — Fred Zollner, American Hall of Fame professional owner (Fort Wayne Pistons) (born 1901)
- July 6 — Junior Saffer, American NBL player (born 1918)
- September 17 — Raúl Fernández, Mexican Olympic player (born 1905)
- October 21 — Stan Zadel, American NBL player (born 1916)
- October 23 — Gary Suiter, American NBA player (born 1942)
- November 8 — Roy Leenig, American NCAA player and coach (born 1920)
- December 9 — Janusz Patrzykont, Polish Olympic player (born 1912)
- December 17 — Franco Marquicias, Filipino Olympic player (born 1905)

== See also ==
- 1982 in sports
