= Andrea Blackwell =

Canadian basketball player

Personal information
- Born: 23 November 1962 (age 63) Calgary, Alberta, Canada

Sport
- Sport: Basketball

Andrea Blackwell (born 23 November 1962) is a Canadian basketball player. She competed in the women's tournament at the 1984 Summer Olympics and the 1996 Summer Olympics. At the university level, she played for the Bishop's Gaiters women's basketball program.

== Awards and honours ==
- Top 100 U Sports women's basketball Players of the Century (1920-2020).
- Bishop's Gaiters Wall of Distinction: Inducted in 1998
