= Coleen Dufresne =

Canadian basketball player

Personal information
- Born: February 15, 1953 (age 73) Halifax, Nova Scotia, Canada

Sport
- Sport: Basketball

Coleen Dufresne (born February 15, 1953) is a former Canadian basketball player. She competed in the women's tournament at the 1976 Summer Olympics.

A native of Halifax, Nova Scotia, who was raised in Dorion, Quebec, Dufresne played basketball at the University of Ottawa, and later studied at McGill University, and then the University of New Brunswick.

Dufresne became head coach of the UNB Reds women's basketball in 1980. She was named AUS Coach of the Year in 1983 and 1984 and was named CIAU Coach of the Year three times.

Dufresne was active from 1984 to 2001 as a coach and from 2001 to 2016 as an administrator for the Manitoba Bison. She had nine appearances in the CIAU championships, winning three gold medals (1988, 1996, 1997), two silver medals (1995, 1998), and two bronze medals (1987, 1994). As Bisons coach, she was twice named CIAU Women's Basketball Coach of the Year (1988, 1998).

Dufresne was Canada West President from 2005 to 2007.

== Awards and honors ==
- Top 100 U Sports women's basketball Players of the Century (1920–2020).
- Austin-Matthews Award for outstanding contribution to interuniversity sport, 2017
