= Angela Johnson (basketball) =

Canadian basketball player

Personal information
- Nationality: Canadian
- Born: 8 December 1952 (age 72); Preston, England

Sport
- Sport: Basketball

Angela Johnson (born 8 December 1953) is a Canadian basketball player. She competed in the women's tournament at the 1976 Summer Olympics.

== Awards and honors ==
- Top 100 U Sports women's basketball Players of the Century (1920-2020).
- Member of Manitoba Sports Hall of Fame (inducted 2007)
