= Miah-Marie Langlois =

Canadian basketball player

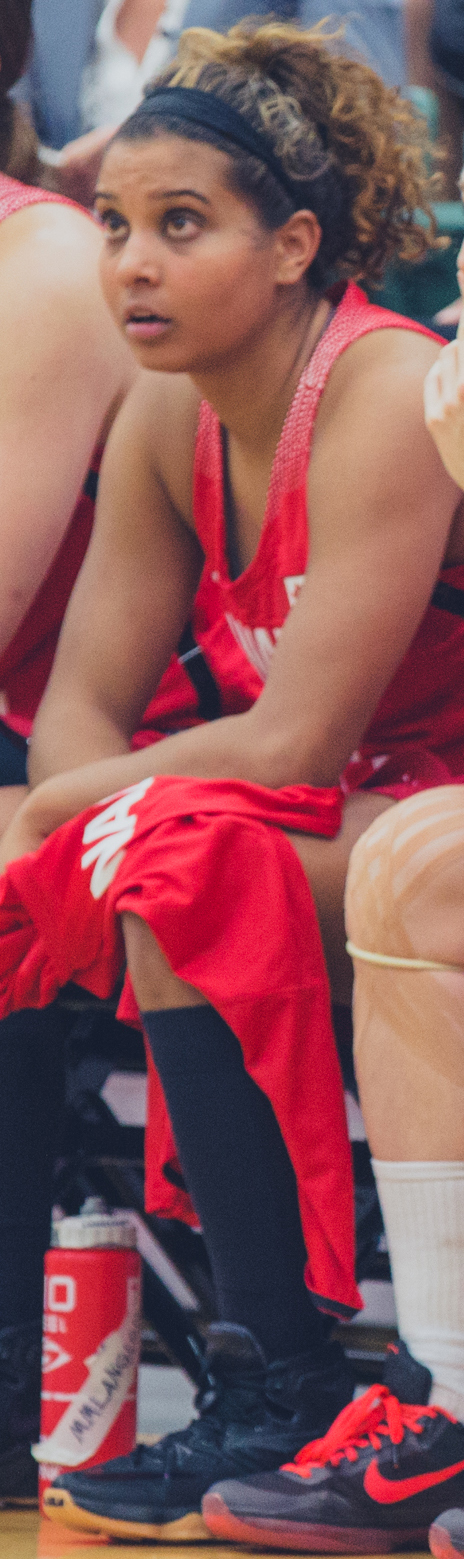
- Langlois in 2016

No. 10 – Dynamo Novosibirsk
- Position: Point guard
- League: RBPL

Personal information
- Born: September 21, 1991 (age 35) Windsor, Ontario, Canada
- Listed height: 5 ft 8 in (1.73 m)
- Listed weight: 139 lb (63 kg)

Career information
- High school: Catholic Central (Windsor, Ontario)
- College: Windsor (2009–2014)
- WNBA draft: 2014: undrafted
- Playing career: 2014–2021

Career highlights
- Import All-Star Team (Russian Premier League, 2016); Champion (Svenska Basketligan League Champion, 2015); MVP (Svenska Basketligan League, 2015); DPY (Svenska Basketligan League, 2015); 4× Canadian University National Champion (2011, 2012,2013, 2014); 3× MVP Canadian University National Championship Tournament (2011, 2012, 2014); 3× DPY Canadian University National League (2012, 2013, 2014)
Medals
Women's basketball
Representing Canada
FIBA Women's AmeriCup
Gold medal – first place	2015 Edmonton
Gold medal – first place	2017 Buenos Aires
Pan American Games
Gold medal – first place	2015 Toronto	Team

Miah-Marie Langlois (born September 21, 1991) is a Canadian former professional basketball player who played for WBC Dynamo Novosibirsk and the Canadian national team, with whom she participated at the 2014 FIBA World Championship, and the 2020 FIBA Olympic qualifier in Belgium. and the 2016 Rio Olympics.

== College ==
Langlois attended the University of Windsor from 2010 to 2014, where she led the Windsor Lancers women's basketball team to four consecutive CIS national championships. She was a three-time CIS Final Eight Tournament MVP, and three-time CIS All-Canadian Defensive Player of the Year.

== National team career ==
=== Pan Am games 2015 ===
Langlois was a member of the Canada women's national basketball team which participated in basketball at the 2015 Pan American Games held in Toronto, Canada. Canada won all three preliminary games against Venezuela, Argentina, and Cuba. Canada faced Brazil in the semifinal, where Langlois contributed five assists in a 91–63 win to earn a spot in the gold-medal game against the USA.

Canada beat USA in the gold-medal 81–73 to win Canada's first Pan Am Games gold-medal in basketball. Langois had three rebounds and two steals.

=== FIBA Americas Women's Championship 2015 ===
Langlois played for Canada at the 2015 FIBA Americas Women's Championship in Edmonton, Alberta, Canada. Canada was assigned to Group A and played Puerto Rico, Chile, the Dominican Republic and Cuba in the preliminary rounds. Canada won the first three games easily with a 94–57 win over Puerto Rico is the closest match. The final preliminary round game was against undefeated Cuba. Cuba played well in that event and was expected to challenge Canada. However, Canada defeated Cuba 92–43 to win first place in the group for a spot in the semifinal against the second-place team in group B, Brazil. Langlois recorded a team-high seven assists.

The semifinal game against Brazil was much closer. Canada led by only six points at halftime but gradually expanded the lead to end up with an 83–66 win, and a spot in the gold-medal game. The gold-medal game was a rematch with Cuba. Cuba started off strong and had an eight-point lead early in the game. Canada responded with a 16–0 run to take over the lead, but Cuba responded and took a small lead early in the second half. Then Canada took the lead back and gradually expanded the lead to end up with the win, 82–66. As the game wound down to the close, the crowd was chanting "Rio","Rio","Rio" in recognition of the fact that the win qualifies Canada for the Olympics in Rio in 2016. Langlois recorded eight assists, the highest on the team.

== Awards and honors ==
- U Sports women's basketball Top 100 Century Team (announced in March 2020)
- University of Windsor Hall of Fame (2022)
- Windsor Essex County Hall of Fame (2024)
