= Gagneux =

Gagneux is a French surname. Notable people with the surname include:

- Georgette Gagneux (1907–1931), French Olympic sprint runner
- Renaud Gagneux (1947–2018), French composer

== See also ==
- Gagneur
