= Debbie Huband =

Canadian basketball player

Personal information
- Born: September 5, 1956 (age 70) Ottawa, Ontario, Canada

Sport
- Sport: Basketball
Medal record
Representing Canada
Basketball
Summer Universiade
Bronze medal – third place	1979 Mexico City

Deborah Ellen Huband (born September 5, 1956) is a Canadian basketball player. She competed in the women's tournament at the 1984 Summer Olympics.

== Playing career ==
As a basketball player at Bishop's University, she set a U Sports single-game scoring record (since broken) with 50 points in a game during the 1981–82 season.

With the Bishop's Gaiters women's basketball' program, she was part of three consecutive QUAA titles (1977–80), complemented by selections to the CIAU All-Canadian team twice, along with recognition as the Bishop's Female Athlete of the Year three times.

=== Canadian national team ===
As a member of the Canadian national basketball team, she served as team captain from 1979 to 1986. Debbie Huband was a member of the bronze medal winning teams at the 1979 and 1987 Pan American Games.

== Coaching career ==
As the UBC Thunderbirds women's basketball head coach, Huband captured three national titles (2003–04, 2005–06, 2007–08), winning the Bronze Baby, and four conference championships (2006–07, 2007–08, 2011–12, 2014–15). On January 11, 2020, Huband captured her 338th regular season coaching win in Canada West Universities Athletic Association play, as the Thunderbirds prevailed over the Trinity Western Spartans by a 100–57 mark. With the win, she eclipsed former University of Victoria head coach Kathy Shields for the all-time wins record in Canada West women's basketball.

== Awards and honors ==
- 1978 CIS Championship MVP: Deb Huband
- 1994 inductee - Canadian Basketball Hall of Fame
- 1995 inductee - Ottawa Sports Hall of Fame
- 1995 Inductee - Bishop's University Wall of Distinction
- 2003–04 Canada West Coach of the Year
- 2003–04 Peter Ennis Award awarded to the U Sports Coach of the Year
- 2017 inductee - Basketball BC Hall of Fame
- 2018 Sport BC In Her Footsteps Honouree
- Top 100 U Sports women's basketball Players of the Century (1920–2020).
