= Sue Stewart =

Canadian basketball player (born 1969)

Personal information
- Born: 14 November 1969 (age 55) Toronto, Ontario, Canada

Sport
- Sport: Basketball

Sue Stewart (born 14 November 1969) is a Canadian basketball player. She competed in the women's tournament at the 1996 Summer Olympics.

== Biography ==
Stewart's parents were from Jamaica and arrived in Canada in 1966. At school, Stewart took part in the 400 metres and long jump, and was named the athlete of the year for her school by the Ontario Federation of School Athletic Associations from 1985 to 1988.

Stewart attended Laurentian University from 1989 to 1995, becoming a five-time winner of the Ontario University Athletics title. While at Laurentian University, Stewart won multiple awards, was named the player of the year, and named the best female basketball player in university in Canada.

In 1994, Stewart went to Germany to play at a professional level, and represented Canada at the 1996 Summer Olympics. Four years later, she was part of the Women's National Basketball Association (WNBA) draft, and was selected by the Detroit Shock. Following her playing career, Stewart became a basketball coach for local teams in Ontario, and graduated from Malone College. Following her graduation, she coached at Ryerson University and the University of Toronto.

In 2005, Stewart fell in a hotel, where she suffered from brain damage, which eventually lead her to being in a coma. She recovered, but the injury impacted on her movement in her left leg and the movement in her eyes.

In 2008, Stewart was inducted into the Mississauga Sports Hall of Fame, becoming the first basketball player to be inducted. In 2015, Stewart published her autobiography, detailing her recovery from her brain injury.

== Awards and honors ==
- Top 100 U Sports women's basketball Players of the Century (1920-2020).
