= Anna Pendergast =

Canadian basketball player

Personal information
- Born: 26 June 1961 (age 63); Charlottetown, Prince Edward Island, Canada

Sport
- Sport: Basketball

Anna Pendergast (born 26 June 1961) is a Canadian basketball player. She competed in the women's tournament at the 1984 Summer Olympics.

== Awards and honors ==
- Top 100 U Sports women's basketball Players of the Century (1920-2020).
