= Shawna Molcak =

Canadian basketball player (born 1968)

Personal information
- Born: 28 October 1968 (age 57) Cardston, Alberta, Canada

Sport
- Sport: Basketball

Shawna Molcak (born 28 October 1968) is a Canadian basketball player. She competed in the women's tournament at the 1996 Summer Olympics.

== Awards and honors ==
- Top 100 U Sports women's basketball Players of the Century (1920–2020).
