= Carol Turney =

Canadian basketball player

Personal information
- Born: 26 June 1955 (age 70) Cornwall, Ontario, Canada

Sport
- Sport: Basketball

Carol Turney (born 26 June 1955) is a Canadian basketball player. She competed in the women's tournament at the 1976 Summer Olympics. She was a member of the Canadian team that won the bronze medal at the 1979 Pan American Games.

== Awards and honors ==
- Top 100 U Sports women's basketball Players of the Century (1920-2020).
- Class of 2017 Victoria Vikes Hall of Fame Inductee
