= Russ Wilkins =

American basketball player (1923–1981)

Personal information
- Born: March 31, 1923 Ossian, Indiana, U.S.
- Died: January 22, 1981 (aged 57) Bluffton, Indiana, U.S.
- Listed height: 6 ft 1 in (1.85 m)
- Listed weight: 190 lb (86 kg)

Career information
- High school: Central (Fort Wayne, Indiana)
- College: Trine
- Position: Forward / guard

Career history
- 1946: Anderson Duffey Packers

Russell Leroy Wilkins (March 31, 1923 – January 22, 1981) was an American professional basketball player. He played in the National Basketball League in five games for the Anderson Duffey Packers during the 1946–47 season and averaged 1.0 points per game.
