= Nora McDermott =

Basketball player (1927–2013)

- Born: Nora June McDermott; June 25, 1927; Vancouver, British Columbia, Canada
- Died: May 16, 2013 (aged 85); North Vancouver, British Columbia, Canada
- Occupation(s): Basketball player Volleyball player
- Years active: 1945–2013

Nora June McDermott (June 25, 1927 – May 16, 2013) was a Canadian basketball and volleyball player, coach and physical education teacher in two Vancouver secondary schools. She played for the University of British Columbia (UBC) Thunderettes varsity basketball team from 1945 to 1946 and again from 1948 to 1949 with victories in two senior "B" championships. McDermott won nine Dominion basketball titles with the Vancouver Eilers throughout the 1950s and played for the Canada team in three editions of the Pan American Games from 1955 to 1963. She coached the bronze medal winning women's basketball squad at the 1967 Pan American Games and taught physical education in Vancouver secondary schools for a total of 40 years. McDermott won two Canadian volleyball club championships with the Vancouver Alums side. She is an inductee of various Halls of Fame and has a school scholarship named after her.

== Early life and education ==
On June 25, 1927, McDermott was born in Vancouver, British Columbia. Her mother, Frances Margaret (née Harrison), was a domestic, and her father, Hugh Joachim McDermott, was a lather and plasterer. McDermott had two sisters. Once construction jobs became scarce during the Great Depression, her father collected relief after walking from the home in the east side to downtown. She attended John Oliver Secondary School in Vancouver, and graduated at the top of her class with a Bachelor's degree in physical education from the University of British Columbia (UBC) in 1949 as well as six varsity letters called the Big Blocks. McDermott added a Bachelor of Physical Education degree in 1956.

== Career ==
She took up basketball in Grade 11 and also played field hockey. McDermott qualified for the Thunderettes varsity basketball team in her first year at UBC. She played for the team from 1945 to 1946 and again from 1948 to 1949 and teamed with Mearnie Summers to led the squad to the 1946/47 and the 1947/48 Vancouver Senior 'B' championships. McDermott was also on the field hockey team and impressed coach May Brown with how she encouraged her teammates at critical moments. She was a member of the Women's Athletic Doctorate and was initiated into the UBC's honorary Delta Sigma Pi sorority due to " the quality of her scholarship, leadership and service."

Following graduation from UBC, McDermott continued to support its program and aided players through the Millennium Breakfast and Ruth Wilson Memorial Scholarship programs. She joined the Vancouver Eilers in 1950 and led the team to its maiden Dominion title that same year. Overall McDermott won the title a record nine times in a row during the 1950s, and claimed the 1955 British Columbia Championship. She played for Canada three times at the Pan American Games: in 1955 in Mexico City as part of the first Canadian women's side to play internationally; in 1959 in Chicago and in 1963 in São Paulo. For the 1967 Pan American Games in Winnipeg, McDermott managed the women's basketball team that claimed the bronze medal. She also played volleyball, winning the 1962 and 1964 Canadian club championships with the Vancouver Alums side.

McDermott taught at John Oliver Secondary School for 1 1/2 decades. In 1962, she was appointed Eric Hamber Secondary School's head of its physical education department when the school opened that year, becoming the first female to lead a physical educational department in Vancouver. McDermott retired after 2 1/2 decades of teaching at Eric Hamber and 40 overall including John Oliver Secondary School in 1987. She was coach of at least three high school teams per year for 27 years. McDermott had a final managerial stint coaching a squad of players aged 65 and over called the "Retreads" who were featured in the documentary The Oldest Basketball Team in the World.

== Personal life ==
She was a Catholic. On May 16, 2013, McDermott died at Lions Gate Hospital, North Vancouver after a short illness. A funeral mass was held for her at the St. Pius X Catholic Church, North Vancouver on the morning of May 24.

== Legacy and honours ==
McDermott was inducted into the BC Sports Hall of Fame in 1991 as a member of the 1954–55 Vancouver Eilers. In 1996, she was added to the Canadian Basketball Hall of Fame, and was inducted into the UBC Sports Hall of Fame in 1998. The gymnasium at Eric Hamber Secondary School was dedicated to her and fellow colleague Bruce Ashdown as part of the 50th anniversary of the founding of the educational institute. McDermott's family established a scholarship in her name for students at Eric Hamber Secondary School. In March 2020, she was named to the Top 100 U Sports women's basketball Players of the Century (1920-2020).
