= Cynthia Johnston =

Canadian basketball player

Personal information
- Born: 11 October 1968 (age 57) Rothesay, New Brunswick, Canada

Sport
- Sport: Basketball
- College team: Bishop's University

Cynthia Johnston (born 11 October 1968) is a Canadian basketball player. She competed in the women's tournament at the 1996 Summer Olympics in Atlanta. She attended Bishop's University in Quebec where she was named four time Bishop's University Female Athlete of the Year as well as two time conference most valuable player. Following her graduating in 1991, she played semi-professional as well as professional basketball in Belgium, Switzerland, Germany and Spain for nine years.

== Early life ==
Johnston attended Kennebecasis Valley High School.

== Awards and honors ==
- Top 100 U Sports women's basketball Players of the Century (1920-2020).
- Bishop's Gaiters Wall of Distinction: Inducted in 2016
- Greater Saint John Sports Hall of Fame (2021 inductee)
