= Chris Critelli =

Canadian basketball player

Personal information
- Born: 5 December 1956 (age 68); St. Catharines, Ontario, Canada

Sport
- Sport: Basketball

Chris Critelli (born 5 December 1956) is a Canadian basketball player. She competed in the women's tournament at the 1976 Summer Olympics.

== Awards and honors ==
- Top 100 U Sports women's basketball Players of the Century (1920-2020).
