= UBC Thunderbirds women's basketball =

Women's college basketball team

- University: University of British Columbia
- Head coach: Isabel Ormond (2nd season)
- Location: Vancouver, British Columbia
- Arena: War Memorial Gymnasium
- Conference: Canada West
- Nickname: Thunderbirds
- Colors: Blue and gold

Conference tournament champions
- 2007, 2008, 2012, 2015

Uniforms
Home	Away

The UBC Thunderbirds women's basketball team represent the University of British Columbia in the Canada West Universities Athletic Association of U Sports women's basketball. The Thunderbirds (originally known as the Thunderettes) have won the Bronze Baby a total of five times, including the first three championships, spanning from 1972 to 1974. The last two national championships took place in 2004 and 2008. Both victories took place against the Regina Cougars. In 2004, the Thunderbirds defeated the Cougars by a 60–53 mark, while the 2008 triumph resulted in a 67–46 final.

== History ==
The 2003–04 season marked a breakthrough for Carrie Watson. In addition to All-Canadian honours, Watson also won the Canada West and Canadian Interuniversity Sport Defensive Player of the Year Awards. She would also earn a pair of university honours, capturing the Marilyn Pomfret Trophy, recognizing the university's Female Athlete of the Year, along with the Thunderbirds Performance Leadership Award. Winning the Bronze Baby National Championship Trophy, the program's first since 1974, ending a 30-year drought, Watson's efforts resulted in National Championship MVP honours. In June 2007, Watson would become the program's first full-time assistant coach.

From 2007 to 2020, the Thunderbirds would enjoy a 152–58 won-loss mark in Canada West league play. Capturing the national championship in 2008, the program would reach the national championship game once again in 2012, settling for a silver medal. At the 2015 CIS Women's Basketball Championship, the program emerged with a bronze medal.

Retiring in 2021, Debbie Huband was the longest serving coach in the history of Thunderbirds basketball. As the Thunderbirds head coach, Huband captured three national titles (2003–04, 2005–06, 2007–08) and four conference championships (2006–07, 2007–08, 2011–12, 2014–15).

=== Season-by-season results ===
Record table
Season	Coach	Overall	Conference	Standing	Postseason
Deb Huband (Canada West) (1995–2021)
1995–96	Deb Huband	0–0	0–0		
1996–97	Deb Huband	0–0	0–0		
1997–98	Deb Huband	0–0	0–0		
1998–99	Deb Huband	0–0	0–0		
1999–2000	Deb Huband	0–0	0–0		
2000–01	Deb Huband	0–0	0–0		
2001–02	Deb Huband	0–0	0–0		
2002–03	Deb Huband	0–0	0–0		
2003–04	Deb Huband	0–0	0–0		
2004–05	Deb Huband	0–0	0–0		
2005–06	Deb Huband	0–0	0–0		
2006–07	Deb Huband	0–0	0–0		
2007–08	Deb Huband	0–0	0–0		
2008–09	Deb Huband	0–0	0–0		
2009–10	Deb Huband	0–0	0–0		
2010–11	Deb Huband	0–0	0–0		
2011–12	Deb Huband	0–0	0–0		
2012–13	Deb Huband	0–0	0–0		
2013–14	Deb Huband	0–0	0–0		
2014–15	Deb Huband	0–0	0–0		
2015–16	Deb Huband	0–0	0–0		
2016–17	Deb Huband	0–0	0–0		
2017–18	Deb Huband	0–0	0–0		
2018–19	Deb Huband	20–8	14–6	5th	
2019–20	Deb Huband	0–0	16–4	3rd	
2020–21	Deb Huband	0–0	0–0		Season cancelled due to the COVID-19 pandemic.
Huband:		0–0 (–)	0–0 (–)		
Erin McAleenan (Canada West) (2021–2023)
2021–22	Erin McAleenan	6–18	6–12		
2022–23	Erin McAleenan	15–16	11–9		
McAleenan:		21–34 (.382)	17–21 (.447)		
Isabel Ormond (Canada West) (2023–present)
2023–24	Isabel Ormond	22–8	17–3	T–2nd	
2024–25	Isabel Ormond	0–0	0–0		
Ormond:		22–8 (.733)	17–3 (.850)		
Total:		43–42 (.506)			
National champion Postseason invitational champion Conference regular season champion Conference regular season and conference tournament champion Division regular season champion Division regular season and conference tournament champion Conference tournament champion

== Statistics ==
=== Individual Leader Scoring ===
Legend
GP	Games played	GS	Games started	MIN	Minutes played
FG	Field-goals	3FG	3-point field-goals	FT	Free-throws
PTS	Points	AVG	Points per game

Season	Player	GP	Min	FG	3FG	FT	Pts	Avg	Canada West Rank
2018–19	Keylyn Filewich	20	609	152	0	65	369	18.5	4th
2019–20	Keylyn Filewich	20	612	165	0	51	381	19.1	4th

== International ==
- Carrie Watson Canada: 2006 FIBA World Championship for Women; Basketball at the 2007 Pan American Games; 2019 Winter Universiade Asst. Coach and Team Leader
- Keylyn Filewich: Canada Basketball at the 2019 Summer Universiade

== Awards and honors ==
- 2004 Basketball BC University Female Athlete of the Year: Carrie Watson
- 2018 Sport BC In Her Footsteps Honouree: Debbie Huband

=== University Awards ===
- 2004 UBC Marilyn Pomfret Trophy (in recognition of UBC's Female Athlete of the Year), Carrie Watson
- 2004 UBC Thunderbirds Performance Leadership Award, Carrie Watson
- 2015 May Brown Trophy (Graduating Female Athlete of the Year): Kris Young
- 2016 UBC Thunderbirds Female Rookie of the Year: Jessica Hanson
- 2019 TAC Performance Award: Keylyn Filewich

==== UBC Sports Hall of Fame ====
- 2016 inductee: Erica McGuinness
- 2021 inductee: Carrie (Watson) Watts

=== Canada West Awards ===
- 2003–04 Canada West Defensive Player of the Year: Carrie Watson
- 2003–04 Canada West Coach of the Year: Debbie Huband

=== U Sports Awards ===
Peter Ennis Award (awarded to the Coach of the Year)

- 2003–04 Debbie Huband

Sylvia Sweeney Award (awarded to the Outstanding student-athlete)

- 1994–95 Adair Duncan

Kathy Shields Award (awarded to the Rookie of the year)

- 2002–03 Kelsey Blair

=== All-Canadians ===
- 2003–04: Carrie Watson, CIS All-Canadian
- 2018–19: Keylyn Filewich – Second Team All-Canadian

==== National championship MVP ====
- 2003–04 Carrie Watson
- 2005–06 Kelsey Blair
- 2007–08 Erica McGuinness

==== Defensive Player of the year ====
- 2003–04 Carrie Watson
- 2008–09 Leanne Evans

=== Canada West Hall of Fame ===
- UBC Thunderettes Women's Basketball Team (1969–75) – 2021 Inductee: Canada West Hall of Fame
- Joanne Sargent – 2019 inductee: Canada West Hall of Fame

== Top 100 ==
In celebration of the centennial anniversary of U SPORTS women’s basketball, a committee of U SPORTS women’s basketball coaches and partners revealed a list of the Top 100 women's basketball players. Commemorating the 100th anniversary of the first Canadian university women’s contest between the Queen’s Gaels and McGill Martlets on February 6, 1920, the list of the Top 100 was gradually revealed over four weeks. Culminating with the All-Canadian Gala, which also recognized national award winners. A total of 14 UBC players were named to the list. Although she played for Bishop's University, eventual Thunderbirds head coach Debbie Huband was also part of this list.

Player	Team(s)	Years	Accolades
Ruth Wilson	UBC	1937–41	
Nora McDermott	UBC	1945–49	She coached the bronze medal winning women's basketball squad at the 1967 Pan American Games
Barb Robertson	UBC	1959–64	
Pauline Genzick	UBC	1966–69	
Betty Ross	UBC	1966–71	
Joanne Sargent	UBC	1968–73	
Terri McGovern	UBC	1969–72	
Bev Barnes	UBC	1970–74	
Debbie Phelan	UBC	1970–75	
Kathy Williams-Shields	UBC; Laurentian	1969–71; 1972–76	
Liz Silcott	Concordia; Waterloo; UBC	1972–79	
Carol Turney-Loos	Saint Mary's; Victoria; UBC	1973–80	Recipient of the 1980 Nan Copp Award
Jessica Mills	UBC	1995–00	
Kristjana Young	UBC	2010–15	

== Thunderbirds in pro basketball ==
Player	Position	Team(s)	Years	Titles
Jessica Hanson	Tipperary Knights Basketball Club	Ireland		None
