= Ian Watson (basketball) =

Australian basketball player

Personal information
- Full name: Ian Broughton Watson
- Nationality: Australian
- Born: 7 June 1949 Melbourne, Australia
- Died: 24 July 1981 (aged 32) Melbourne

Sport
- Sport: Basketball

Ian Broughton Watson (7 June 1949 – 24 July 1981) was an Australian basketball player. He competed in the men's tournament at the 1972 Summer Olympics and the 1976 Summer Olympics.
