= 1983 in basketball =

The following are the basketball events of the year 1983 throughout the world.

== Player awards (NBA) ==
=== Regular season MVP ===
- Moses Malone, Philadelphia 76ers

=== NBA Finals MVP ===
- Moses Malone, Philadelphia 76ers

== Collegiate awards ==
- Men
  - John R. Wooden Award: Ralph Sampson, Virginia
  - Frances Pomeroy Naismith Award: Ray McCallum, Ball State
  - Associated Press College Basketball Player of the Year: Ralph Sampson, Virginia
  - NCAA basketball tournament Most Outstanding Player: Patrick Ewing, Georgetown
  - Associated Press College Basketball Coach of the Year: Guy Lewis, Houston
  - Naismith Outstanding Contribution to Basketball: John Wooden
- Women
  - Naismith College Player of the Year: Anne Donovan, Old Dominion
  - Wade Trophy: LaTaunya Pollard, Long Beach
  - NCAA basketball tournament Most Outstanding Player: Cheryl Miller, USC

== Naismith Memorial Basketball Hall of Fame ==
- Class of 1983:
  - Bill Bradley
  - Dave DeBusschere
  - Jack Twyman
  - Dean Smith

== Births ==
- January 29 — Nedžad Sinanović, Bosnian basketball player

== Deaths ==
- May 20 — Clair Bee, American Hall of Fame college coach (Long Island) (born 1896)
- June 6 — Curly Armstrong, American NBA player (Fort Wayne Pistons) (born 1918)
- June 19 — Dave Quabius, American NBL player (Sheboygan Red Skins, Oshkosh All-Stars) (born 1916)
- July 12 — Donald White, All-American player (Purdue) and college coach (Washington University, Connecticut, Rutgers) (born 1898)
- July 15 — Gary Bradds, American NBA/ABA player, college All-American at Ohio State (born 1942)
- December 4 — Bruce Drake, American Hall of Fame college coach (Oklahoma Sooners) (born 1905)
- December 21 — Mark Workman, All-American college player (West Virginia) and NBA player (born 1930)

== See also ==
- 1983 in sports
