= 1978 in basketball =

The following are the basketball events of the year 1978 throughout the world.

== National team competitions ==
=== Men's Division ===
- 1978 FIBA Basketball World Cup in Quezon City and Manila:
  (gold) Yugoslavia (win world title via OT, 82–81)
  (silver) Soviet Union
  (bronze) Brazil
- 1978 FIBA Oceania Championship in New Zealand:
  (gold) Australia (wins Best-of-3 series, 2–1)
  (silver) New Zealand
- AfroBasket 1978 in Dakar:
  (gold) Senegal (Win African title, 103–72)
  (silver) Ivory Coast
  (bronze) Egypt

=== Women's Division ===
- 1978 FIBA Asia Women's Cup in Kuala Lumpur:
  (gold) South Korea
  (silver) China
  (bronze) Japan

=== Youth Division ===
- 1978 FIBA Europe Under-18 Championship in Italy:
  (gold) Soviet Union (Win European title, 104–100)
  (silver) Spain
  (bronze) Yugoslavia

== Professional club seasons ==
Country	League	Champion	Runner-up	Result	Playoff format
United States	1977–78 NBA season	Washington Bullets	Seattle SuperSonics	4–3	Best-of-7 series

== Player awards (NBA) ==
=== Regular season MVP ===
Bill Walton, Portland Trail Blazers

=== NBA Finals MVP ===
Wes Unseld, Washington Wizards

- CSP Limoges were promoted to the first division of the French championship (future Pro A)

== Naismith Memorial Basketball Hall of Fame ==
- Class of 1978:
  - Paul Arizin
  - Joe Fulks
  - Cliff Hagan
  - Jim Pollard

== Births ==
- February 14 - Richard Hamilton, NBA player
- May 13 - Mike Bibby, NBA player
- June 19 — Dirk Nowitzki, NBA player
- August 23 — Kobe Bryant, NBA player (died 2020)
- September 9 - Shane Battier, NBA player
- December 2 - Jason Collins, NBA player

== Deaths ==
- May 8 — Chuck Hyatt, 70, American Hall of Fame college player (Pittsburgh).
- June 6 — Paul Lambert, 43, American college coach (Pittsburg State, Hardin–Simmons, Southern Illinois).
- June 30 — Bob Matheny, 49, All-American college player (California)
- August 15 — Mike Novak, 63, American NBA, BAA and NBL player.
- September 11 — Omar Browning, 66, American AAU player and coach of the 1948 Olympic champions.
- September 24 — Bob Kramer, 56, American NBL player (Oshkosh All-Stars, Youngstown Bears).
- September 28 — Neil Johnston, 49, American Hall of Fame player (Philadelphia Warriors).
- November 11 — Bennie Borgmann, 77, American Hall of Fame player (Original Celtics).

== See also ==
- 1978 in sports
