= 1988 in basketball =

The following are the basketball events of the year 1988 throughout the world.

== Player awards (NBA) ==
=== Regular season MVP ===
- Michael Jordan, Chicago Bulls

=== NBA Finals MVP ===
- James Worthy, Los Angeles Lakers

=== Slam Dunk Contest ===
- Michael Jordan, Chicago Bulls

=== Three-point Shootout ===
- Larry Bird, Boston Celtics

== Collegiate awards ==
- Men
  - John R. Wooden Award: Danny Manning, Kansas
  - Naismith College Coach of the Year: Larry Brown (basketball), Kansas
  - Frances Pomeroy Naismith Award: Jerry Johnson (basketball player), Florida Southern
  - Associated Press College Basketball Player of the Year: Hersey Hawkins, Bradley
  - NCAA basketball tournament Most Outstanding Player: Glen Rice, Michigan
  - Associated Press College Basketball Coach of the Year: John Chaney (basketball, born 1932), Temple
  - Naismith Outstanding Contribution to Basketball: Red Auerbach
- Women
  - Naismith College Player of the Year: Sue Wicks, Rutgers
  - Naismith College Coach of the Year: Leon Barmore, Louisiana Tech
  - Wade Trophy: Teresa Weatherspoon, Louisiana Tech
  - Frances Pomeroy Naismith Award: Suzie McConnell, Penn State
  - NCAA basketball tournament Most Outstanding Player: Erica Westbrooks, Louisiana Tech
  - Carol Eckman Award: Kay Yow, NC State

== Naismith Memorial Basketball Hall of Fame ==
- Class of 1988:
  - Clyde Lovellette
  - Bobby McDermott
  - Ralph Miller
  - Wes Unseld

== Births ==
- March 3 — Kaan Üner, Turkish professional basketball player

== Deaths ==
- January 5 — Pete Maravich, American Hall of Fame NBA player (Atlanta Hawks, New Orleans Jazz) (born 1947)
- February 9 — Joe Reiff, All-American college player (Northwestern) (born 1911)
- March 8 — Gordon Carpenter, American AAU player and Olympic Gold medalist (1948) (born 1919)
- April 5 — Swede Halbrook, American NBA player (Syracuse Nationals) (born 1933)
- April 22 — Victor Holt, All-American college player (Oklahoma) (born 1908)
- July 4 — Ross McBurney, All-American college player (Wichita State) (born 1906)
- October 19 — Forrest Sprowl, 69, All-American college player (Purdue) and college coach (Lawrence).
- December 14 — Charlie T. Black, All-American college player (Kansas) and college coach (Nebraska) (born 1901)

== See also ==
- 1988 in sports
