= 1987 in basketball =

The following are the basketball events of the year 1987 throughout the world.

== Player awards (NBA) ==
=== Regular season MVP ===
- Magic Johnson, Los Angeles Lakers

=== NBA Finals MVP ===
- Magic Johnson, Los Angeles Lakers

=== Slam Dunk Contest ===
- Michael Jordan, Chicago Bulls

=== Three-point Shootout ===
- Larry Bird, Boston Celtics

== Collegiate awards ==
- Men
  - John R. Wooden Award: David Robinson, Navy
  - Naismith College Coach of the Year: Bob Knight, Indiana
  - Frances Pomeroy Naismith Award: Muggsy Bogues, Wake Forest
  - Associated Press College Basketball Player of the Year: David Robinson, Navy
  - NCAA basketball tournament Most Outstanding Player: Danny Manning, Kansas
  - Associated Press College Basketball Coach of the Year: Tom Davis, Iowa
  - Naismith Outstanding Contribution to Basketball: Pete Newell
- Women
  - Naismith College Player of the Year: Clarissa Davis, Texas
  - Naismith College Coach of the Year: Pat Summitt, Tennessee
  - Wade Trophy: Shelly Pennefather, Villanova
  - Frances Pomeroy Naismith Award: Rhonda Windham, USC
  - NCAA basketball tournament Most Outstanding Player: Tonya Edwards, Tennessee
  - Carol Eckman Award: Jody Conradt, Texas

== Naismith Memorial Basketball Hall of Fame ==
- Class of 1987:
  - Rick Barry
  - Walt Frazier
  - Bob Houbregs
  - Pete Maravich
  - Bobby Wanzer

== Births ==
- March 18 - C. J. Miles, NBA player
- June 22 - Danny Green, NBA player
- October 5 - Brandon Wright, NBA player
- October 11 - Mike Conley Jr., NBA player
- November 3 - Ty Lawson, NBA player
- November 10 - D. J. Augustin, NBA player

== Deaths ==
- April 7 — Pick Dehner, American NBL player (Hammond Ciesar All-Americans), college All-American (Illinois) and high school coach (born 1914)
- April 15 — Press Maravich, American college and professional player and coach (born 1915)
- May 7 — Phil Woolpert, American Hall of Fame college coach (San Francisco) (born 1915)
- June 5 — Joe Bradley, American NBA player (Chicago Stags) (born 1928)
- June 13 — Johnny High, American NBA player (Phoenix Suns) (born 1957)
- August 16 — Nick Vanos, American NBA player (Phoenix Suns) (born 1963)

== See also ==
- 1987 in sports
