= Mauro Liburdi =

Italian basketball player

Personal information
- Born: December 6, 1982 (age 43) Italy, Cassino
- Listed height: 6 ft 7 in (2.01 m)
- Listed weight: 220 lb (100 kg)

Career information
- College: Italian Military National Team -02
- Playing career: 2001–present
- Position: Power forward
- Number: 6

Career history
- ?: Associazione Basket Latina

Mauro "Libu" Liburdi (born December 6, 1982) is an Italian professional basketball forward with Italian citizenship. He is from Cassino, Italy. Known for being a committed and hard working player, he's developed his perimeter game and long range shooting while training with many of the players from the New York Knicks in the United States. Librudi started his career as an inside player, but now can also play the SF position.

In February 2013, Liburdi became both the first, and youngest, active player in the history of basketball to own a professional team in Italy. He is a partner of Basket Cassino and is their starting power forward.

Liburdi led his team during the SHAPE International Basketball Tournament in Belgium, beating the US for the first time in 12 years.

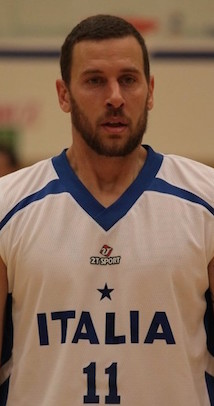
Mauro Liburdi Military National Team

In 2014 it was reported Liburdi debut in boxing (Rome Heavyweight division)

In 2017, National Television RAI3 interview Liburdi for the Record of his Team since his arrival in January (13W from January to April) explaining his passion for boxing and basketball, quoting his friendship with NBA player Danilo Gallinari.

== High school and college basketball ==
Italian Military National Team followed by Lega Basket Serie A

== Professional career ==
Career:

2001-2002: Recir Stella Azzurra Roma U20 team

2002 Roseto Summer League (Porte SJB team) 3g 12.6ppg

2002-2003: Forze Armate (B2) 2003 June: Roseto Summer League (Executive team)

2003-2004: Toyota Virtus Imola (B1): 30 games: 11.1ppg, 5.6rpg

2004: In May was tested by Bipop-Carire Reggio Emilia (SerieA)

2004: In June was tested by Gloria Montecatini (Ita/Legadue) and by Bipop Reggio Emilia (ItalyLY-Lega 2)

2004-2005: Sicc BPA Jesi (SerieA): 10 games: 3pts

2005-2006: A.S. Stella Azzurra Roma (B2, starting five), in Feb.'06 moved to Benedetto XIV Cento (B1): 10 games: 7.0ppg, 3.3rpg, 1.3spg, 2FGP: 63.9%, 3PT: 33.3%, FT: 80.0%

2006-2007: Penta Gruppo Ozzano (B1): 28 games: 11.3ppg, 5.4rpg, 1.2spg, 2FGP: 61.1%, 3PT: 30.0%, FT: 68.7%

2007-2008: Everlast Firenze (B1, starting five): 20 games: 14.1ppg, 5.4rpg, 2FGP: 54.0%, 3PT: 29.8%, FT: 82.9%

2008-2009: VemSistemi Forli (A dilettanti, starting five): 25 games: 15.6ppg, 5.8rpg, 1.5spg, 2FGP: 62.9%, 3PT: 36.5%, FT: 71.0%

2009 June: Imola Summer League Open (Aget Imola)

2009-2010: Associazione Basket Latina (Lega2): left in Nov.'09 : 6 games: 9.7ppg, 3.8rpg, 1.3spg, FGP: 70.0%, FT: 76.2%

2011-2012: Eagles Ozzano: 20 Games 14.3 ppg

2012-2013: Basket Cassino: 11 Games 16.4 ppg

2013: Military National Team (2nd Place)

2014: Military National Team (3rd place)

2015-2016: Serie B - BPC Virtus TSB Cassino 10 games: 11.0ppg, 20.8min, FGP:63.0%, 3pt:0.6/1.5-3pt40%, 2pt:4/2.6FTP92%, DRb2.7-ORb2.1RbTOT4.8, Ass0.8, Val12.9

2016-2017: Serie B - Dinamic Venafro 15 games: 291pt Tot, 19.4 ppg, 33.8min, FGP:55%, 3pt:0.8/2.3-3pt34%, 2pt:5.4/9.8 55% FT:6.2/7.6 81% DRb5.4-ORb3.73Rb TOT9.13, Ass1.13, Val22.73

== See also ==
- Lega Basket Serie A
