= Ferenc Hepp =

Hungarian basketball administrator (1909-1980)

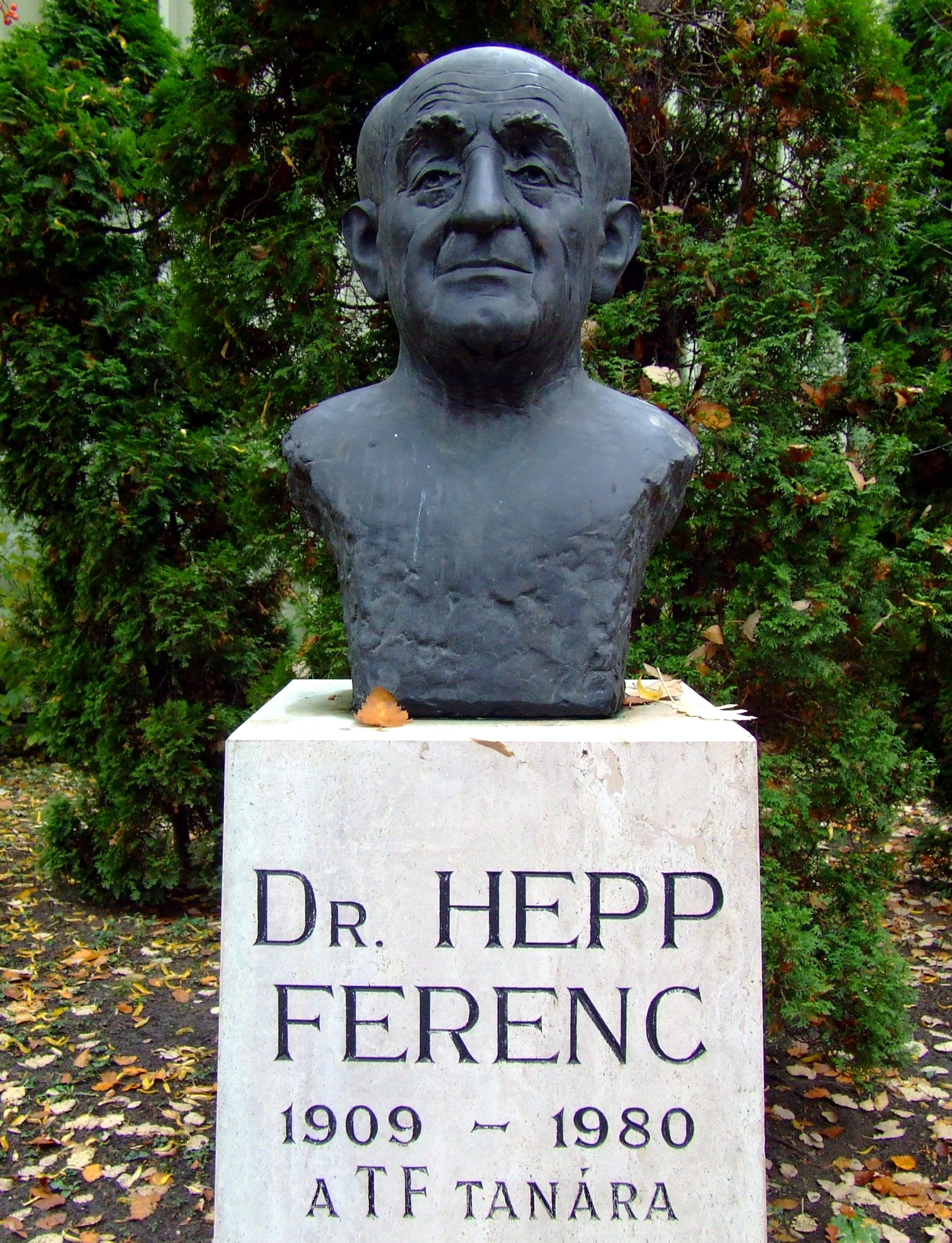
Statue of Dr. Ferenc Hepp

Dr. Ferenc Hepp (3 November 1909 in Békés, Hungary – 27 November 1980) was a basketball administrator. He is considered "the father of Hungarian basketball". He became the president of the Hungarian Basketball Federation in 1954 and was a member of the FIBA Central Board in the 1950s and 1960s. He was enshrined into the Naismith Memorial Basketball Hall of Fame as a contributor in 1981. In 2007, he was enshrined as a contributor into the FIBA Hall of Fame.
