= Lois and Doug Mitchell U Sports Athletes of the Year Awards =

Canadian sports award

Lois and Doug Mitchell Awards
- League: U Sports
- Sponsor: Makadiff Sports
- First awarded: 1993 to Diane Scott and Andy Cameron
- Most recent: 2026 to Abby Guezen and Ryder Rattee
- Website: usports.ca/en/awards/athletes-of-the-year

The Lois and Doug Mitchell U Sports Athletes of the Year Awards, formerly known as the Lieutenant Governor Athletic Awards, Borden Ladner Gervais (BLG) Awards, and Howard, Mackie Awards, are given annually to top male and female athletes in Canadian universities that are members of U Sports. Each of the 56 member schools nominate a female and male athlete of the year which are further narrowed down to representatives from each of the four athletics conference of U Sports (Atlantic University Sport, Canada West Universities Athletic Association, Ontario University Athletics, and Réseau du sport étudiant du Québec). The eight nominees each receive a commemorative durilium ring and the two winners receive $10,000 post-graduate scholarships and are awarded the Doug and Lois Mitchell Trophy. The nominees must have participated in their sport for at least two years and cannot win the award more than once.

== History ==
The awards were founded in 1993 by Douglas Mitchell who wanted to provide more recognition for Canadian university athletes. They were initially named after Mitchell's law firm Howard, Mackie in Calgary, Alberta. After a merger of law firms in 2000, the awards were renamed the BLG Awards after the new law firm Borden Ladner Gervais. The awards were further rebranded as the Lieutenant Governor Athletic Awards in 2019 while continuing to be championed by Mitchell and his wife, Lois Mitchell, the 18th Lieutenant Governor of Alberta. The women's winner was awarded the Jim Thompson Trophy as of 2003 and the men's winner was awarded the Doug Mitchell Trophy as of 2009. Starting in 2020, both winners are awarded Doug & Lois Mitchell Trophies while the Jim Thompson Trophy is now given to a distinguished alumni beginning in 2021. The awards were rebranded again in 2021 as the Lois and Doug Mitchell U Sports Athletes of the Year Awards.

The annual awards live presentation featured the eight nominated athletes, live entertainment from notable canadian singers such as Nikki Yanofsky, Jordan McIntosh, Charlie Major, Gerry Dee (Mr.D.) to name but a few, and took place at the Jack Singer Concert Hall in front of an audience of peers, prominent political figures and business people. The event was recorded for broadcast on The Sports Network (TSN), one of Canada's major sports television networks. White Iron produced the original event from 1993 until 2001. Paul J. Toth assumed the duties of Producer and Lead Creative from 2008 until 2017, which he oversaw the transition from TSN to Sportsnet in 2012 until 2017 when it was no longer broadcast.

The BLG Awards event weekend was generally held in Calgary with the exception of 2009 & 2013 when it was held in Toronto and 2011 when the event was held in Vancouver.

== List of past winners ==
Year	Female			Male		
Year	Athlete	Sport	School	Athlete	Sport	School
1992-93	Diane Scott	Volleyball	University of Winnipeg	Andy Cameron	Volleyball	University of Calgary
1993-94	Sandra Carroll	Basketball	University of Winnipeg	Tim Tindale	Football	University of Western Ontario
1994-95	Linda Thyer	Track and field	McGill University	Bill Kubas	Football	Wilfrid Laurier University
1995-96	Justine Ellison	Basketball	University of Toronto	Don Blair	Football	University of Calgary
1996-97	Terri-Lee Johannesson	Basketball	University of Manitoba	Curtis Myden	Swimming	University of Calgary
1997-98	Foy Williams	Track and field	University of Toronto	Titus Channer	Basketball	McMaster University
1998-99	Corinne Swirsky	Ice hockey	Concordia University	Alexandre Marchand	Track and field	Université de Sherbrooke
1999-2000	Jenny Cartmell	Volleyball	University of Alberta	Michael Potts	Soccer	University of Western Ontario
2000-01	Leighann Doan-Reimer	Basketball	University of Calgary	Kojo Aidoo	Football	McMaster University
2001-02	Elizabeth Warden	Swimming	University of Toronto	Brian Johns	Swimming	University of British Columbia
2002-03	Kim St. Pierre	Ice hockey	McGill University	Ryan McKenzie	Track and field	University of Windsor
2003-04	Joanna Niemczewska	Volleyball	University of Calgary	Adam Ens	Volleyball	University of Saskatchewan
2004-05	Adrienne Power	Track and field	Dalhousie University	Jesse Lumsden	Football	McMaster University
2005-06	Marylène Laplante	Volleyball	Université Laval	Osvaldo Jeanty	Basketball	Carleton University
2006-07	Jessica Zelinka	Track and field	University of Calgary	Josh Howatson	Volleyball	Trinity Western University
2007-08	Laetitia Tchoualack	Volleyball	University of Montreal	Rob Hennigar	Ice hockey	University of New Brunswick
2008-09	Annamay Pierse	Swimming	University of British Columbia	Joel Schumaland	Volleyball	University of Alberta
2009-10	Liz Cordonier	Volleyball	University of British Columbia	Erik Glavic	Football	University of Calgary
2010-11	Jessica Clemençon	Basketball	University of Windsor	Tyson Hinz	Basketball	Carleton University
2011-12	Ann-Sophie Bettez	Ice hockey	McGill University	Marc-André Dorion	Ice hockey	McGill University
2012-13	Shanice Marcelle	Volleyball	University of British Columbia	Kyle Quinlan	Football	McMaster University
2013-14	Justine Colley	Basketball	Saint Mary's University	Philip Scrubb	Basketball	Carleton University
2014-15	Korissa Williams	Basketball	University of Windsor	Ross Proudfoot	Cross country Track and field	University of Guelph
2015-16	Kylie Masse	Swimming	University of Toronto	Andrew Buckley	Football	University of Calgary
2016-17	Arielle Roy-Petitclerc	Soccer	Université Laval	Philippe Maillet	Ice hockey	University of New Brunswick
2017-18	Marie-Alex Bélanger	Volleyball	University of Montreal	Kadre Gray	Basketball	Laurentian University
2018-19	Kiera Van Ryk	Volleyball	University of British Columbia	Mathieu Betts	Football	Université Laval
2019-20	Kelsey Wog	Swimming	University of Manitoba	Aboubacar Sissoko	Soccer	University of Montreal
2021-22	Sophie de Goede	Rugby; Basketball	Queen's University	Tre Ford	Football; Track and field	University of Waterloo
2022-23	Sarah Gates	Basketball	McMaster University	Gabriel Mastromatteo	Swimming	University of Toronto
2023-24	Audrey Leduc	Track and field	Université Laval	Jonathan Sénécal	Football	Université de Montréal
2024-25	Gage Grassick	Basketball	University of Saskatchewan	Taylor Elgersma	Football	Wilfrid Laurier University
2025-26	Abby Guezen	Volleyball	University of Alberta	Ryder Rattee	Track and field	University of Alberta
