= Yannick Gagneur =

French basketball player

Personal information
- Born: 15 March 1980 (age 46) Paris, France
- Listed height: 2.00 m (6 ft 7 in)
- Listed weight: 98 kg (216 lb)

Career information
- Playing career: 1998–2004
- Position: Small forward

Career history
- 1998–2001: SLUC Nancy Basket
- 2001–2002: Strasbourg IG
- 2002–2003: Virtus Bologna
- 2003: Spirou Charleroi
- 2003–2004: SLUC Nancy Basket
- 2004: CO Beauvaisien

Yannick Gagneur (born 15 March 1980 in Paris, France) is a French basketball player who played for French Pro A league club Nancy.
