= 1976 in basketball =

The following are the basketball events of the year 1976 throughout the world.

Tournaments include international (FIBA), professional (club) and amateur and collegiate levels.

== 1976 Olympics ==
- Men:
  (gold) United States
  (silver) Yugoslavia
  (bronze) Soviet Union
- Women:
  (gold) Soviet Union
  (silver) United States
  (bronze) Bulgaria

The United States men's team won its eighth Gold medal in nine competitions. This was the first time that Women's basketball was played at the Summer Olympics.

== International tournaments ==
=== Men's tournaments ===
1975–76 FIBA European Champions Cup

- Winner: Mobilgirgi Varèse
- Runners-up: Real Madrid

1976 FIBA Intercontinental Cup

	Team	Pld	W	L	PF	PA	Points
1.	(Spain) Real Madrid	5	5	0	462	381	10
2.	(Italy) Mobilgirgi Varèse	5	4	1	406	335	9
3.	(Argentina) Obras Sanitarias	5	3	2	428	373	8
4.	(Brazil) EC Amazonas Franca	5	2	3	382	355	7
5.	(United States) Missouri Tigers	5	1	4	380	401	6
6.	(Senegal) ASFA	5	0	5	241	454	5

=== Women's tournaments ===
1975–76 FIBA Women's European Champions Cup

- Winner: Sparta Prague

== College tournaments ==
Men

- 1976 NCAA Men's Division II Basketball Tournament
  - Winner: University of Puget Sound
- 1976 NCAA Men's Division I Basketball Tournament
  - Final Four

National semifinals
E	Rutgers	70
MW	Michigan	86
ME	Indiana	65
W	UCLA	51

National Championship Game
MW	Michigan	68
ME	Indiana	86
National third-place game
W	UCLA	106
E	Rutgers	92

- 1976 National Invitation Tournament
  - Winner: Kentucky
- 1976 NAIA Division I men's basketball tournament
  - Winner: Coppin State

Women

- AIAW women's basketball tournament
  - Winner: Delta State University

== ABA ==
- Most Valuable Player: Julius Erving, New York Nets
- Rookie of the Year: David Thompson, Denver Nuggets
- Coach of the Year: Larry Brown, Denver Nuggets
- ABA All-Star Game MVP: Julius Erving
  - see also:1976 ABA All-Star Game
- ABA Finals Most Valuable Player Award: Julius Erving
  - see also:1976 ABA Playoffs

== NAIA ==
- 1976 NAIA Basketball Tournament

== NBA ==
- NBA draft
- Most Valuable Player: Kareem Abdul-Jabbar, Los Angeles Lakers
- Rookie of the Year: Alvan Adams, Phoenix Suns
- Coach of the Year: Bill Fitch, Cleveland Cavaliers
- NBA All-Star Game MVP:Dave Bing
  - see also:1976 NBA All-Star Game
- NBA Champion:Boston Celtics
- NBA Finals Most Valuable Player Award:Jo Jo White
  - see also:1976 NBA Playoffs, 1976 NBA Finals

== Naismith Memorial Basketball Hall of Fame ==
- Class of 1976:
  - Tom Gola
  - Ed Krause
  - Harry Litwack
  - Bill Sharman

== Deaths ==
- March 21 - Joe Fulks, American NBA Hall of Fame player (born 1921)
- June 8 — Bob Feerick, American NBA player and coach (born 1920)
- October 27 — Jerry Bush, American college coach (Toledo, Nebraska) (born 1914)

== Births ==
- April 25 - Tim Duncan, American NBA player and a Hall of Famer
- May 19 - Kevin Garnett, American NBA player and a Hall of Famer
- June 12 - Antawn Jamison, American NBA player
- September 25 - Chauncey Billups, American NBA player
