= 2026 U Sports Women's Basketball Championship =

Canadian university basketball championship

2026 U Sports Women's Final 8
- 2026 Final 8 Championship Logo Championship All-Star Team; Ella Murphy Wiebe (SSK); Gage Grassick (SSK); Kylee Speedy (UNB); Katie Butts (UNB); Kourtney Oss (CGY)
- Season: 2025–26
- Teams: Eight
- Finals site: Amphithéâtre Desjardins; Quebec City, Quebec
- Champions: Saskatchewan Huskies (4th title)
- Runner-up: UNB Reds
- Winning coach: Lisa Thomaidis (4th title)
- Championship MVP: Ella Murphy Wiebe (Saskatchewan Huskies)
- Television: CBC Sports / CBC Gem

The 2026 U Sports Women's Final 8 Basketball Tournament was held March 4–8, 2026, in Quebec City, Quebec, to determine a national champion for the 2025–26 U Sports women's basketball season.

The Saskatchewan Huskies defeated the AUS Champion UNB Reds to win the program's fourth national championship. The Huskies entered the season as defending champions and proceeded to go undefeated through the 20-game regular season. Their program-record 51-game winning streak - the longest in U Sports women's basketball since Simon Fraser's 54-game run in 2010 - was finally snapped by the Calgary Dinos in a 61-58 upset during the Canada West semifinals.

Despite the loss, the Huskies' body of work earned them the at-large wildcard berth, entering the national tournament as the fifth seed. By securing the Bronze Baby, the Huskies became the first team to repeat as national champions since the Carleton Ravens (2023–24), finishing the year with a near-perfect overall record of 30-1.

== Host ==
The tournament was hosted by Université Laval at the school's Amphithéâtre Desjardins, located within the Pavillon de l'éducation physique et des sports (PEPS) complex. This marked a record-setting fifth time that Laval has hosted the women's national championship, following previous tournaments in 1987, 1991, 1996, and 2015.

The Amphithéâtre Desjardins serves as the primary home for the Laval Rouge et Or basketball and volleyball programs. For the 2026 Final 8, the venue featured a seating capacity of approximately 3,000, utilizing 1,884 permanent seats and 1,208 removable courtside bleachers to create an "amphitheater" atmosphere.

== Participating teams ==
The seeding for teams was announced on March 1, 2026, with the defending champion Saskatchewan Huskies being awarded the at-large berth.

Seed	Team	Qualified	Record	Last	Total
1	Toronto Metropolitan Bold	OUA Champion	20–2	2022	1
2	UNB Reds	AUS Champion	18–2	None	0
3	Calgary Dinos	Canada West Champion	16–4	1989	1
4	UBC Thunderbirds	Canada West Finalist	16–4	2008	6
5	Saskatchewan Huskies	Canada West Semifinalist (At-large)	20–0	2025	3
6	McGill Martlets	RSEQ Champion	11–5	2017	1
7	Carleton Ravens	OUA Finalist	16–6	2024	3
8	Laval Rouge et Or	RSEQ Finalist (Host)	13–3	None	0

== Championship Bracket ==
Quarterfinals: March 5
1	TMU Bold	54
8	Laval Rouge et Or	57
4	UBC Thunderbirds	55
5	Saskatchewan Huskies	71
2	UNB Reds	81
7	Carleton Ravens	63
3	Calgary Dinos	58
6	McGill Martlets	45

Semi-Finals: March 7
8	Laval Rouge et Or	43
5	Saskatchewan Huskies	55
2	UNB Reds	70
3	Calgary Dinos	66

Gold Medal Game: March 8
5	Saskatchewan Huskies	77
2	UNB Reds	68
Bronze Medal Game: March 8
8	Laval Rouge et Or	59
3	Calgary Dinos	66

== Consolation bracket ==
Semi-Finals: March 6
1	TMU Bold	68
4	UBC Thunderbirds	66
7	Carleton Ravens	64
6	McGill Martlets	62

Fifth Place Game: March 7
1	TMU Bold	58
7	Carleton Ravens	60
