= TMU Bold women's basketball =

Women's college basketball team at Toronto Metropolitan University

- University: Toronto Metropolitan University
- Head coach: Carly Clarke (Since 2012–13 season)
- Location: Toronto, Ontario
- Arena: Mattamy Athletic Centre
- Conference: Ontario University Athletics
- Nickname: Bold
- Colors: Blue and gold

U Sports tournament champions
- 2022

U Sports tournament appearances
- 2015, 2016, 2019, 2020, 2022, 2026

Conference tournament champions
- 1956, 1957, 2016, 2022, 2026

Conference division champions
- 1972, 1976, 2015, 2016, 2020, 2022, 2025

The TMU Bold women's basketball (formerly Ryerson Rams) team represents Toronto Metropolitan University in the Ontario University Athletics conference of U Sports women's basketball. The Bold have won one national championship following their victory in the 2022 tournament.

== History ==
The Ryerson Rams women's basketball team had their most successful era between 2012 and 2020. Led by Canada women's national basketball team assistant coach Carly Clarke the Rams went 109-57 between 2012 and 2020.

With the arrival of Clarke, she led the Rams into the OUA playoffs in her inaugural season. The 2014–15 season saw the greatest season in Rams history up to that time. Finishing with a program-record 16 wins, compared to only three losses, the Rams qualified for the Critelli Cup championship game, also qualifying for the Canadian Interuniversity Sport (now U Sports) Final 8 Tournament.

The following season (2015-2016), the Rams matched their 16-win total. In what proved to be the Rams most successful season, they were led by OUA Player of the Year, OUA Defensive Player of the Year and CIS National Player of the Year Keneca Pingue-Giles, capturing their first Critelli Cup defeating the Ottawa Gee-Gees 66–60. At the 2016 CIS Women's Basketball Championship, the Ryerson Rams reached the National Final before falling to the Saskatchewan Huskies in the final 85–71.

The 2016 Critelli Cup triumph was the first provincial championship won by any program in Ryerson Rams athletics history. At the Final 8 Tournament, the Rams qualified for the gold medal game, marking the first Rams team to appear in a national championship final. In January 2016, the Rams reached No. 2 in the national rankings, an historic first.

Heading into 2016–17, the Rams welcomed Kellie Ring, a fifth-year transfer player. Additionally, the Rams’ lineup saw a pair of players, Emma Fraser and Bronwyn Williams, qualify for the OUA All-Rookie team.

The Ryerson Rams hosted the 2019 U Sports Women's Basketball Championship at Mattamy Athletic Centre in Toronto, a season that saw the Rams reach the OUA Playoffs for the twelfth straight season, finishing the tournament in 5th place.

Reaching 18 wins in 2019–20, the Rams hosted the Brock Badgers women's basketball team in the Critelli Cup championship game. Additionally, the Rams qualified for the 2020 U SPORTS Women's Basketball Final 8 National Championship.in 2020 falling to the Brock Badgers 84–71. In March 2020, Rams basketball alum Keneca Pingue-Giles was named to the list of the Top 100 U Sports Women's Basketball Players of the Century (2011-2020).

== Season-by-season results ==
The TMU Bold women's basketball team hosting the Windsor Lancers women's basketball team at the Varsity Court in Mattamy Athletic Centre in Toronto, Ontario.

Note: Records prior to the 1977–78 season are incomplete

Statistics overview
Season	Team	W	L	PF	PA	Pts.	Standing	Postseason
Joyce Bertram (Independent) (1951–1952)
1951–52	Joyce Bertram	–	–	–	–	–	–	–
Joyce Bertram:		–						
Joyce Tyrell (Independent) (1952–1953)
1952–53	Joyce Tyrell	–	–	–	–	–	–	–
Joyce Tyrell:		–						
1953–54	unknown	–	–	–	–	–	–	–
Margaret Harrington (Independent) (1954–1956)
1954–55	Margaret Harrington	–	–	–	–	–	–	–
1955–56	Margaret Harrington	–	–	–	–	–	–	Intermediate Intercollegiate Champions
Margaret Harrington:		–						
Marg Curtis (Independent) (1956–1957)
1956–57	Marg Curtis	–	–	–	–	–	–	Intermediate Intercollegiate Champions
Marg Curtis:		–						
Marilyn McVey (Independent) (1957–1958)
1957–58	Marilyn McVey	–	–	–	–	–	–	–
Marilyn McVey:		–						
Marilyn McVey (Independent) (1958–1963)
1958–59	Marilyn McVey	–	–	–	–	–	–	–
1959–60	Marilyn McVey	–	–	–	–	–	–	–
1960–61	Marilyn McVey	–	–	–	–	–	–	–
1961–62	no coach	–	–	–	–	–	–	–
1962–63	Marilyn McVey	–	–	–	–	–	–	–
Marilyn McVey:		–						
Gloria Evans (Independent) (1963–1964)
1963–64	Gloria Evans	–	–	–	–	–	–	–
Gloria Evans:		–						
Marilyn McVey (Independent) (1964–1965)
1964–65	Marilyn McVey	–	–	–	–	–	–	–
Marilyn McVey:		–						
Joyce Lee-Lym (O-QWCIA) (1965–1967)
1965–66	Joyce Lee-Lym	–	–	–	–	–	–	–
1966–67	Joyce Lee-Lym	–	–	–	–	–	–	–
Joyce Lee-Lym:		–						
Pat Reid (O-QWCIA) (1967–1970)
1967–68	Pat Reid	–	–	–	–	–	–	–
1968–69	Pat Reid	–	–	–	–	–	–	–
1969–70	Pat Reid	–	–	–	–	–	–	–
Pat Reid:		–						
Shelly Irvine (O-QWCIA) (1970–1971)
1970–71	Shelly Irvine	–	–	–	–	–	–	–
Shelly Irvine (OWIAA) (1971–1973)
1971–72	Shelly Irvine	2	1	–	–	–	1st (Intermediate)	OWIAA Intermediate Champions
1972–73	Shelly Irvine	–	–	–	–	–	3rd (Intermediate)	–
Shelly Irvine:		2–1 (.667)						
Linda Ryan (OWIAA) (1973–1975)
1973–74	Linda Ryan	–	–	–	–	–	3rd (Intermediate)	–
1974–75	Linda Ryan	–	–	–	–	–	–	–
Linda Ryan:		–						
Bob Fullerton (OWIAA) (1975–1978)
1975–76	Bob Fullerton	–	–	–	–	–	1st (Central)	–
1976–77	Bob Fullerton	5	3	–	–	10	2nd (Central)	–
1977–78	Bob Fullerton	3	2	121	107	6	3rd (Central)	–
Bob Fullerton:		8–5 (.615)						
Skip Letheran (OWIAA) (1978–1981)
1978–79	Skip Letheran	0	12	448	765	0	7th (Tier 2)	–
1979–80	Skip Letheran	1	11	473	877	2	7th (Tier 2)	–
1980–81	Skip Letheran	2	9	547	851	4	7th (Tier 2)	–
Phil Schlote:		2–22 (.083)						
Sandy Turner (OWIAA) (1981–1985)
1981–82	Sandy Turner	1	11	447	922	2	7th (East)	–
1982–83	Sandy Turner	0	12	386	902	0	7th (East)	–
1983–84	Sandy Turner	1	11	521	939	2	6th (East)	–
1984–85	Sandy Turner	1	11	–	–	2	7th (East)	–
Sandy Turner:		1–45 (.022)						
Mike Hickey (OWIAA) (1985–1988)
1985–86	Mike Hickey	4	8	–	–	8	5th (East)	–
1986–87	Mike Hickey	6	6	627	–	12	3rd (East)	OWIAA Final 8
1987–88	Mike Hickey	3	9	–	–	6	–	–
Mike Hickey:		13–23 (.361)						
Theresa Burns (OWIAA) (1988–1992)
1988–89	Theresa Burns	0	12	510	912	0	7th (East)	–
1989–90	Theresa Burns	1	11	466	971	2	7th (East)	–
1990–91	Theresa Burns	3	9	617	789	6	6th (East)	–
1991–92	Theresa Burns	5	7	714	710	10	4th (East)	–
Theresa Burns:		9–39 (.188)						
Sandy Pothier (OWIAA) (1992–1997)
1992–93	Sandy Pothier	3	9	565	762	6	6th (East)	–
1993–94	Sandy Pothier	2	10	606	803	4	6th (East)	–
1994–95	Sandy Pothier	2	10	540	821	4	6th (East)	–
1995–96	Sandy Pothier	3	9	550	815	6	5th (East)	–
1996–97	Sandy Pothier	5	15	1167	1268	10	6th (East)	–
Sandy Pothier (OUA) (1997–2010)
1997–98	Sandy Pothier	8	12	1238	1313	16	4th (East)	OUA Final 8
1998–99	Sandy Pothier	8	12	1177	1301	16	4th (East)	OUA East Quarterfinalist
1999–2000	Sandy Pothier	8	12	1161	1248	16	4th (East)	OUA East Quarterfinalist
2000–01	Sandy Pothier	5	15	1056	1320	10	6th (East)	–
2001–02	Sandy Pothier	11	9	1125	1149	22	4th (East)	OUA East Semifinalist
2002–03	Sandy Pothier	7	13	1140	1301	14	6th (East)	–
2003–04	Sandy Pothier	8	14	1311	1350	16	6th (East)	–
2004–05	Sandy Pothier	6	16	1226	1246	12	6th (East)	OUA East Quarterfinalist
2005–06	Sandy Pothier	6	16	1150	1289	12	7th (East)	–
2006–07	Sandy Pothier	2	20	1122	1587	4	7th (East)	–
2007–08	Sandy Pothier	5	17	1230	1519	10	6th (East)	OUA East Quarterfinalist
2008–09	Sandy Pothier	9	13	1347	1448	18	5th (East)	OUA East Semifinalist
2009–10	Sandy Pothier	14	8	1510	1342	28	2nd (East)	OUA East Semifinalist
Sandy Pothier:		112–230 (.327)						
Charles Kissi (OUA) (2010–2012)
2010–11	Charles Kissi (interim)	10	12	1325	1388	20	4th (East)	OUA East Semifinalist
2011–12	Charles Kissi	11	11	1356	1453	22	5th (East)	OUA Quarterfinalist
Charles Kissi:		21–23 (.477)						
Carly Clarke (OUA) (2012–present)
2012–13	Carly Clarke	8	12	1230	1292	16	4th (East)	OUA East Quarterfinalist
2013–14	Carly Clarke	9	13	1298	1410	18	5th (East)	OUA East Quarterfinalist
2014–15	Carly Clarke	16	3	1384	1085	32	3rd; 1st (East)	OUA Finalist; CIS Final 8
2015–16	Carly Clarke	16	3	1526	1173	32	3rd; 1st (East)	OUA Champion; CIS Runner–up
2016–17	Carly Clarke	13	6	1294	1098	26	3rd; 2nd (East)	OUA Quarterfinalist
2017–18	Carly Clarke	13	10	1659	1461	26	4th (East)	OUA Quarterfinalist
2018–19	Carly Clarke	17	6	1678	1313	34	3rd (East)	OUA Quarterfinalist; U Sports Final 8
2019–20	Carly Clarke	18	4	1677	1268	36	1st (Central)	OUA Finalist; U Sports Final 8
2020–21	Season canceled due to COVID-19 pandemic							
2021–22	Carly Clarke	14	0	1041	702	28	1st (East)	OUA Champion; U Sports Champion
2022–23	Carly Clarke	14	8	1570	1345	28	2nd (Central)	OUA Quarterfinalist
2023–24	Carly Clarke	16	6	1441	1360	32	2nd (Central)	OUA Semifinalist
2024–25	Carly Clarke	17	5	1479	1193	34	1st (Central)	OUA Semifinalist
2025–26	Carly Clarke	20	2	1648	1240	40	1st (Central)	OUA Champion; U Sports Final 8
Carly Clarke:		191–78 (.710)						
Total:		359–466 (.435)						
National champion Postseason invitational champion Conference regular season champion Conference regular season and conference tournament champion Division regular season champion Division regular season and conference tournament champion Conference tournament champion

== U Sports Final 8 results ==
Year	Seed	Round	Opponent	Result
2015	#7	First Round; Consolation Semi-Finals; Consolation Finals	#2 British Columbia #6 Saint Mary's #5 Alberta	L 59–81; W 76–60; L 65–73
2016	#5	First Round; Semi-Finals; Finals	#4 Regina #1 McGill #2 Saskatchewan	W 73–70; W 87–72; L 71–85
2019	#8	First Round; Consolation Semi-Finals; Consolation Finals	#1 Laval #5 Regina #6 Acadia	L 51–73; W 63–45; W 91–67
2020	#3	First Round; Consolation Semi-Finals	#6 Prince Edward Island #7 Calgary	L 70–75; L 64–87
2022	#1	First Round; Semi-Finals; Finals	#8 Prince Edward Island #4 Brock #3 Winnipeg	W 80–49; W 64–56; W 70–48
2026	#1	First Round; Consolation Semi-Finals; Consolation Finals	#8 Laval #4 British Columbia #7 Carleton	L 54–57; W 68–66; L 58–60

== Individual leader scoring ==
Legend
GP	Games played	GS	Games started	MIN	Minutes played
FG	Field-goals	3FG	3-point field-goals	FT	Free-throws
PTS	Points	AVG	Points per game

Season	Player	GP	Min	FG	3FG	FT	Pts	Avg	OUA rank
2019–20	Marin Scotten	22	708	139	57	40	375	17.0	3rd
2018–19	Sofia Paska	18	465	87	0	65	239	13.3	12th
2017–18									
2016–17									
2015–16									
2014–15	Keneca Pingue-Giles	18	490	116	31	48	311	17.3	
2013–14	Keneca Pingue-Giles	22	533	115	26	69	325	14.8	8th
2012–13	Kelsey Wright	20	585	84	40	69	277	13.9	12th
2011–12	Ashley MacDonald	22	812	117	49	118	401	18.2	2nd
2010–11	Ashley MacDonald	22	749	115	51	91	372	16.9	2nd
2009–10	Ashley MacDonald	22	719	107	68	37	319	14.5	7th

== International ==
- Carly Clarke Coach: Canada 2011 FIBA Americas U16 Championship, 2012 and 2014 FIBA U17 World Championship; 2020 Tokyo Olympics Asst. Coach
- Mariah Nunes Canada: 2017 Summer Universiade
- Kellie Ring Canada: 2017 Summer Universiade
- Jama Bin-Edward: Canada 2019 Winter Universiade

== Awards and honors ==
=== OUA Awards ===
- 2017–18 OUA Rookie of the Year Marin Scotten
- 2017 OUA All-Star Game participant: Nicole DiDomenico
- 2015–16 OUA Most Valuable Player: Keneca Pingue-Giles
- 2015–16 OUA Defensive Player of the Year: Keneca Pingue-Giles
- 2012–13 OUA East Rookie of the Year : Cassandra Nofuente

==== OUA All-Stars ====
- 2016–17 First Team: Sofia Paska
- 2016–17 First Team: Kellie Ring
- 2015–16 First Team: Keneca Pingue-Giles

==== OUA All-Rookie ====
- 2016–17 OUA All-Rookie Team: Bronwyn Williams – Ryerson Rams
- 2016–17 OUA All-Rookie Team: Emma Fraser – Ryerson Rams
- 2012–13 OUA East All-Rookie: Cassandra Nofuente

==== Joy Bellinger Award ====
- 2016–17 OUA Joy Bellinger Award: Nicole DiDomenico – Ryerson Rams presented annually to the student-athlete who excels in academics, athletics, and community service for her time in the local community
- 2006–07 Joy Bellinger Award of Merit : Lisa Greig
- 2003–04 Joy Bellinger Award of Merit: Ashley Keohan

=== U Sports Awards ===
Note: U Sports was formerly known as Canadian Interuniversity Sport (CIS), and prior to that, the Canadian Interuniversity Athletic Union (CIAU).

- 2015–16 Nan Copp Award: Keneca Pingue-Giles
- 1990–91 CIS Rookie of the Year: Darcel Wright

==== U Sports All-Canadians ====
First Team

- Keneca Pingue-Giles - CIS First Team All-Canadian (2015–16)

Second Team

- Sofia Paska - U Sports Second Team All-Canadian (2017–18)
- Sofia Paska - U Sports Second Team All-Canadian (2016–17)

==== U Sports All-Rookie ====
- Marrin Scotten - U Sports All-Rookie Team (2017–18)
- Cassandra Nofuente - CIS All-Rookie Team (2012–13)
- Mandi-May Bond - CIS All-Rookie Team (1998–99)
