= U Sports women's basketball championship =

Canadian collegiate women's basketball championship award

- Current season, competition or edition: 2026 U Sports Women's Basketball Championship
- Sport: Basketball
- Founded: 1972; 54 years ago
- First season: 1972
- Organizing body: U Sports
- No. of teams: 8
- Country: Canada
- Most recent champion: Saskatchewan Huskies (4th title)
- Most titles: Victoria Vikes (9)
- Broadcasters: CBC, TVA

The U Sports Women's Basketball Championship, branded as the Women's Basketball Final 8, is a Canadian university basketball tournament conducted by U Sports, and determines the women's national champion. The tournament involves the champions from each of Canada's four regional sports conferences. The Bronze Baby trophy is awarded to the winners.

Seventeen different schools have won the tournament. The University of Victoria has the most tournament wins, with nine. Laurentian University has seven championships. The University of British Columbia has taken the title six times, while the University of Windsor and Simon Fraser University have five apiece. The University of Saskatchewan has won four. Carleton University, the University of Winnipeg and University of Manitoba have each won three championships, while Bishop's University and have won two. Seven programs have one national championship.

== History ==
The tournament was originally composed of just four qualifying teams from 1972 to 1976 until it was expanded to include six in 1977. The championship was then changed to include eight teams in 1979 and has generally remained the same since then. In the 2011 edition, the then-named CIS had West, Central, and East regional play-in games to determine the three remaining spot in the tournament (the other five went to the four conference champions and host). In 2012, there were East and West regional games to determine two additional berths and by 2013 the league had reverted to voting in the three remaining spots. Aside from those two years of regional qualifiers, the tournament has always taken place over one weekend at a pre-determined host site.

The trophy features a figure that is a replica of a statue that was in the grounds of Dunfermline College of Physical Education in Scotland. The trophy was first donated in 1922 by the Students' Council of McGill University and awarded to the Ontario and Quebec conference champion of the Women's Interuniversity Athletic Union (WIAU). After the WIAU amalgamated with the Ontario Women's Interuniversity Athletic Union (OWIAA) in 1971, the trophy was retired and returned to McGill. The trophy was then offered to the Canadian Women's Interuniversity Athletic Union (CWIAU) in 1972 to be competed for at a fully national level. The CWIAU merged with the Canadian Interuniversity Athletic Union (CIAU), the men's union, in 1978 and awarded by the now-named U Sports governing body.

The 2021 championship tournaments were cancelled due to the COVID-19 pandemic.

== Format ==
The championship consists of an eight-team single-elimination tournament. Four teams automatically qualify for the tournament as one of the winners of the four conferences, two qualify as the runners-up of both the OUA and Canada West conference, one qualifies as the host, and one is given an at-large berth.

== Results ==
Year	Winner	Runner-up	Score	Venue	Host
1972	UBC Thunderettes	UNB Red Bloomers	74–69	–	University of Saskatchewan
1973	UBC Thunderettes (2)	Manitoba Bisonettes	50–30	–	McGill University
1974	UBC Thunderettes (3)	UNB Red Bloomers (2)	67–53	–	University of Winnipeg
1975	Laurentian Lady Vees	UBC Thunderettes	59–49	–	University of New Brunswick
1976	Laurentian Lady Vees (2)	UNB Red Bloomers (3)	50–42	–	University of Guelph
1977	Laurentian Lady Vees (3)	Winnipeg Wesmenettes	61–50	–	University of Calgary
1978	Laurentian Lady Vees (4)	Winnipeg Lady Wesmen (2)	69–51	–	University of Calgary (2)
1979	Laurentian Lady Vees (5)	Victoria Vikettes	61–53 (2OT)	–	University of Regina
1980	Victoria Vikettes	Dalhousie Tigers	64–59	–	Dalhousie University
1981	Victoria Vikettes (2)	Bishop's Gaiters	61–59	–	University of Guelph (2)
1982	Victoria Vikettes (3)	Bishop's Gaiters (2)	70–55	–	University of Saskatchewan (2)
1983	Bishop's Gaiters	Victoria Vikettes (2)	64–49	–	University of Manitoba
1984	Bishop's Gaiters (2)	Winnipeg Lady Wesmen (3)	70–62	–	University of Manitoba (2)
1985	Victoria Vikettes (4)	Laurentian Lady Vees	71–52	–	Bishop's University
1986	Toronto Varsity Blues	Victoria Vikettes (3)	68–63	–	University of Winnipeg (2)
1987	Victoria Vikettes (5)	Laurentian Lady Vees (2)	54–52	–	Laval University
1988	Manitoba Bisons	Calgary Dinosaurs	61–55	–	University of Lethbridge
1989	Calgary Dinosaurs	UPEI Panthers	92–55	–	Laurentian University
1990	Laurentian Lady Vees (6)	Calgary Dinosaurs (2)	74–65	–	University of Toronto
1991	Laurentian Lady Vees (7)	Regina Cougars	79–72 (OT)	–	Laval University (2)
1992	Victoria Vikes (6)	Winnipeg Wesmen (4)	64–51	–	University of Prince Edward Island
1993	Winnipeg Wesmen	Victoria Vikes (4)	70–63	–	University of Victoria
1994	Winnipeg Wesmen (2)	Toronto Varsity Blues	90–76	–	University of Calgary (3)
1995	Winnipeg Wesmen (3)	Manitoba Bisons (2)	72–61	–	Lakehead University
1996	Manitoba Bisons (2)	Toronto Varsity Blues (2)	81–77 (OT)	–	Laval University (3)
1997	Manitoba Bisons (3)	York Yeowomen	73–62	–	Lakehead University (2)
1998	Victoria Vikes (7)	Manitoba Bisons (3)	66–61	–	Lakehead University (3)
1999	Alberta Pandas	Victoria Vikes (5)	54–46	–	Lakehead University (4)
2000	Victoria Vikes (8)	Calgary Dinos (3)	57–41	–	University of Alberta
2001	Regina Cougars	Alberta Pandas	94–85	–	University of Alberta (2)
2002	Simon Fraser Clan	Laval Rouge et Or	66–51	–	McMaster University
2003	Victoria Vikes (9)	Winnipeg Wesmen (5)	60–51	–	McMaster University (2)
2004	UBC Thunderbirds (4)	Regina Cougars (2)	60–53	–	University of Winnipeg (3)
2005	Simon Fraser Clan (2)	Winnipeg Wesmen (6)	70–60	–	University of Winnipeg (4)
2006	UBC Thunderbirds (5)	Cape Breton Capers	56–53	–	University of New Brunswick (2)
2007	Simon Fraser Clan (3)	Alberta Pandas (2)	72–68	–	Memorial University of Newfoundland
2008	UBC Thunderbirds (6)	Regina Cougars (3)	67–46	Physical Activity Complex (PAC)	University of Saskatchewan (3)
2009	Simon Fraser Clan (4)	Regina Cougars (4)	68–62	CKHS, Main Gymnasium	University of Regina (2)
2010	Simon Fraser Clan (5)	Windsor Lancers	77–56	Burridge Gymnasium	McMaster University (3)
2011	Windsor Lancers	Saskatchewan Huskies	63–49	St. Denis Centre Fieldhouse	University of Windsor
2012	Windsor Lancers (2)	UBC Thunderbirds (2)	69–53	Jack Simpson Gymnasium	University of Calgary (4)
2013	Windsor Lancers (3)	Regina Cougars (5)	66–57	CKHS, Main Gymnasium	University of Regina (3)
2014	Windsor Lancers (4)	Saint Mary's Huskies	71–45	St. Denis Centre Fieldhouse	University of Windsor (2)
2015	Windsor Lancers (5)	McGill Martlets	60–47	PEPS Gymnasium	Laval University (4)
2016	Saskatchewan Huskies	Ryerson Rams	85–71	Richard J. Currie Centre	University of New Brunswick (3)
2017	McGill Martlets	Laval Rouge et Or (2)	66–55	CARSA Performance Gym	University of Victoria (2)
2018	Carleton Ravens	Saskatchewan Huskies (2)	69–48	CKHS, Main Gymnasium	University of Regina (4)
2019	McMaster Marauders	Laval Rouge et Or (3)	70–58	Mattamy Athletic Centre	Ryerson University
2020	Saskatchewan Huskies (2)	Brock Badgers	82–64	TD Place Arena	Carleton University
2021	Cancelled due to the COVID-19 pandemic			Athletic and Recreation Centre (ARC)	Queen's University
2022	Ryerson Rams	Winnipeg Wesmen (7)	70–48	Athletic and Recreation Centre (ARC)	Queen's University
2023	Carleton Ravens (2)	Queen's Gaels	71–59	Sullivan Field House	Cape Breton University
2024	Carleton Ravens (3)	Saskatchewan Huskies (2)	70–67	Saville Community Sports Centre	University of Alberta (3)
2025	Saskatchewan Huskies (3)	Carleton Ravens	85–66	Thunderbird Sports Centre	University of British Columbia
2026	Saskatchewan Huskies (4)	UNB Reds	77–68	PEPS Gymnasium	Laval University (5)
2027				Scotiabank Centre	Acadia University

== Title by school ==
Appearances	Team	Conference	Wins	Losses	Win %	MRC	MRA
14	Victoria Vikes	Canada West	9	5	.643	2003	2003
10	Winnipeg Wesmen	Canada West	3	7	.300	1995	2022
9	Laurentian Lady Vees	OUA	7	2	.778	1991	1991
8	UBC Thunderbirds	Canada West	6	2	.750	2008	2012
6	Manitoba Bisons	Canada West	3	3	.500	1997	1998
6	Regina Cougars	Canada West	1	5	.167	2001	2013
6	Windsor Lancers	OUA	5	1	.833	2015	2015
6	Saskatchewan Huskies	Canada West	4	2	.667	2026	2026
5	Simon Fraser Clan^{[A]}	Canada West	5	0	1.000	2010	2010
4	Bishop's Gaiters	RSEQ	2	2	.500	1984	1984
4	Calgary Dinos	Canada West	1	3	.250	1989	2000
4	Carleton Ravens	OUA	3	1	.750	2024	2025
4	UNB Reds	AUS	0	4	.000	None	2026
3	Toronto Varsity Blues	OUA	1	2	.333	1986	1996
3	Alberta Pandas	Canada West	1	2	.667	1999	2007
3	Laval Rouge et Or	RSEQ	0	3	.000	None	2019
2	McGill Martlets	RSEQ	1	1	.500	2017	2017
2	Ryerson Rams/TMU Bold	OUA	1	1	.500	2022	2022
1	McMaster Marauders	OUA	1	0	1.000	2019	2019
1	Dalhousie Tigers	AUS	0	1	.000	None	1980
1	UPEI Panthers	AUS	0	1	.000	None	1989
1	York Yeowomen	OUA	0	1	.000	None	1997
1	Cape Breton Capers	AUS	0	1	.000	None	2006
1	Saint Mary's Huskies	AUS	0	1	.000	None	2014
1	Brock Badgers	OUA	0	1	.000	None	2020
1	Queen's Gaels	OUA	0	1	.000	None	2023

A. Simon Fraser Clan were members of the CIS (now U Sports) from 2001 to 2010.

== See also ==
- NCAA Division I women's basketball tournament
- Timeline of women's basketball
