= 2022 U Sports Women's Basketball Championship =

Canadian college basketball tournament

2022 U Sports Women's Final 8
- Season: 2021–22
- Teams: Eight
- Finals site: Athletic and Recreation Centre (ARC); Kingston, Ontario
- Champions: Ryerson Rams (1st title)
- Runner-up: Winnipeg Wesmen
- Winning coach: Carly Clarke
- Tournament MVP: Jama Bin-Edward (Ryerson Rams)
- Television: CBC

The 2022 U Sports Women's Final 8 Basketball Tournament was held March 31 to April 3, 2022, in Kingston, Ontario, to determine a national champion for the 2021–22 U Sports women's basketball season. This was the first tournament held since 2020 due to the COVID-19 pandemic in Canada. This year's tournament was originally scheduled for March 10 to March 13, 2022, but was delayed three weeks due to ongoing pandemic issues.

The tournament saw the Ryerson Rams crowned as champions, the school's first U Sports national title. Ryerson beat Winnipeg, which took the silver medal, while Queen's beat Brock for the bronze.

== Host ==
The tournament was being hosted by Queen's University at its Athletic and Recreation Centre (ARC), the first time Queen's hosted the championship game. Queen's had originally been awarded hosting duties for the 2021 U Sports Women's Basketball Championship, but the tournament was cancelled due to the ongoing COVID-19 pandemic in Canada.

== Participating teams ==
Seed	Team	Qualified	Record	Last	Total
1	Ryerson Rams	OUA Champion	14–0	None	0
2	Saskatchewan Huskies	Canada West Champion	14–2	2020	2
3	Winnipeg Wesmen	Canada West Finalist	14–2	1995	3
4	Brock Badgers	OUA Finalist	12–0	None	0
5	Acadia Axewomen	AUS Champion	11–4	None	0
6	Laval Rouge et Or	RSEQ Champion	7–5	None	0
7	Queen's Gaels	OUA Semifinalist (Host)	9–5	None	0
8	UPEI Panthers	AUS Semifinalist (At-large berth)	11–2	None	0

== Championship bracket ==
First Round: March 31
1	Ryerson Rams	80
8	UPEI Panthers	49
4	Brock Badgers	85
5	Acadia Axewomen	74
2	Saskatchewan Huskies	55
7	Queen's Gaels	62
3	Winnipeg Wesmen	81
6	Laval Rouge et Or	67

Semi-Finals: April 2
1	Ryerson Rams	64
4	Brock Badgers	56
3	Winnipeg Wesmen	80
7	Queen's Gaels	78

Gold Medal Game: April 3
1	Ryerson Rams	70
3	Winnipeg Wesmen	48
Bronze Medal Game: April 3
4	Brock Badgers	57
7	Queen's Gaels	75

== Consolation bracket ==
Semi-Finals: April 1
5	Acadia Axewomen	67
8	UPEI Panthers	78
2	Saskatchewan Huskies	71
6	Laval Rouge et Or	49

Fifth Place Game: April 3
2	Saskatchewan Huskies	80
8	UPEI Panthers	48
