= 2018 U Sports Women's Basketball Championship =

Canadian university basketball championship

- Season: 2017-18
- Teams: Eight
- Finals site: Centre for Kinesiology Health and Sport; Regina, Saskatchewan
- Champions: Carleton Ravens (1st title)
- Runner-up: Saskatchewan Huskies

The 2018 U Sports Women's Basketball Championship was held March 8–11, 2018, in Regina, Saskatchewan. It was hosted by the University of Regina which had previously hosted the tournament in 1979, 2009, and 2013.

The top-seeded and undefeated Carleton Ravens won their first Bronze Baby championship in program history, defeating the sixth-seeded Saskatchewan Huskies. Besides the accomplishment in itself, the win buoyed Carleton's basketball program, whose men's team had failed to appear in the final game for the first time in eight years. The men won the bronze medal in Halifax earlier on the same day its women won the title in Regina.

== Participating teams ==
Seed	Team	Qualified
1	Carleton Ravens	OUA Champion
2	Regina Cougars	Canada West Champion (Host)
3	Acadia Axewomen	AUS Champion
4	McGill Martlets	RSEQ Champion
5	McMaster Marauders	OUA Finalist
6	Saskatchewan Huskies	Canada West Finalist
7	Laval Rouge et Or	RSEQ Finalist (At-large berth)
8	Calgary Dinos	Canada West Bronze Medalist

== Championship Bracket ==
First Round: March 8
1	Carleton Ravens	52
8	Calgary Dinos	42
4	McGill Martlets	55
5	McMaster Marauders	39
3	Acadia Axewomen	67
6	Saskatchewan Huskies	72
2	Regina Cougars	76
7	Laval Rouge et Or	56

Semi-Finals: March 10
1	Carleton Ravens	46
4	McGill Martlets	44
2	Regina Cougars	71
6	Saskatchewan Huskies	74

Final: March 11
1	Carleton Ravens	69
6	Saskatchewan Huskies	48
Bronze Medal Game: March 11
2	Regina Cougars	66
4	McGill Martlets	63

== Consolation Bracket ==
Semi-Finals: March 9
5	McMaster Marauders	52
8	Calgary Dinos	60
3	Acadia Axewomen	63
7	Laval Rouge et Or	74

Fifth Place Game: March 10
7	Laval Rouge et Or	68
8	Calgary Dinos	71

== See also ==
2018 U Sports Men's Basketball Championship
