= Brock Badgers women's basketball =

Ontario women's university basketball team

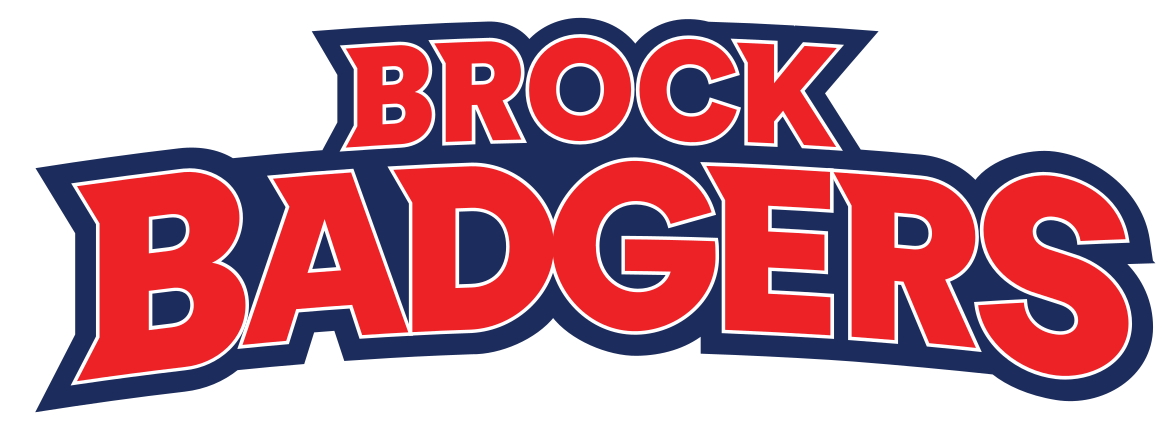
- University: Brock University
- Head coach: Mike Rao (Since 2018–19 season)
- Location: St. Catharines, Ontario
- Arena: Bob Davis Gymnasium
- Conference: Ontario University Athletics
- Nickname: Badgers
- Colors: Blue, Red, and White

U Sports tournament appearances
- 1983, 1987, 2002, 2012, 2020, 2022

Conference tournament champions
- 1983, 2020

Uniforms
Home	Away

The Brock Badgers women's basketball team represents Brock University in the Ontario University Athletics conference of U Sports women's basketball. The Badgers have won two OUA championships, winning the Critelli Cup in 1983 and 2020.

== History ==
Led by head coach Pat Woodburn, the 1982–83 Badgers team set a program record with 30 wins in one season, compared to merely three losses. Winning the OWIAA Championship, the Badgers emerged with the bronze medal at the CIAU (now U Sports) Championships. They would become the first Brock women's team inducted into the Badgers Athletics Hall of Fame.

In 2018, Mike Rao, a native of Welland, Ontario was appointed as head coach for the Badgers. During Rao's first season, the Badgers won 11 games, compared to 13 losses. Qualifying for the postseason, the Badgers enjoyed their first playoff victory since 2012. Reaching the second round, they were bested by the eventual national champion McMaster Marauders. His second season (2019–20) saw the Badgers enjoy a 17–5 record, along with their first appearance at the U Sports national championships since 2001–02.

=== Critelli Cup season ===
Heading into the 2019–20 season, the Badgers benefitted form a pair of transfers. Jenneke Pilling redshirted in 2018–19, transferring from the Windsor Lancers. Forward Samantha Keltos, raised in St. Catharines, arrived from an NCAA Division I school.

Samantha Keltos, who set a team record for blocks in a single game, registering nine against the York Lions on January 29, 2020, she would emerge as a postseason hero for the Badgers. Against the Western Mustangs, ranked fifth in the country, in the OUA Semi-Finals, Keltos registered 17 points for the sixth-ranked Badgers, along with seven rebounds, as the Badgers prevailed in a 69–65 final. For her efforts, Keltos was recognized as both, the OUA and U Sports Female Athlete of the Week.

Challenging the Ryerson Rams on February 29, 2020, in the Critelli Cup Final, Keltos logged 42 points, resulting in an emotional victory, as it marked the Badgers first provincial title since 1983. Shooting 10-for-15 in the opening half, she wound up as the Lululemon Player of the Game honours.

From three-point range, she went eight-of-nine, adding 12 rebounds, Keltos enjoyed her seventh career double-double, part of a statistical performance including three steals and a pair of assists. Winning the Critelli Cup, there was a sense of serendipity for the program. Of note, the Cup, awarded to the OUA Provincial Champion, is named in honour of former Brock basketball Coach and Assistant Athletic Director Chris Critelli.

The 2019–20 season marked a storybook ending for Melissa Tatti. Earning a trio of honors, highlighted by the 2019–20 OUA Player of the Year Award, OUA First-Team All-Star recognition, plus the pinnacle of a spot on the U SPORTS First Team All-Canadians, she would also establish herself among the program's statistical leaders. Finishing her Badgers career with 1,458 points in 100 games played, it ranks second in all-time regular-season scoring. She would also graduate as the program's all-time regular season leader in five statistical categories: field goals (507), assists (423), steals (303), free throws (243) and three-pointers (201).

At the 2020 U SPORTS Women's National Championships, Keltos was the Badgers scoring leader in each of their three contests. In addition, Samantha Keltos was named the Nike Top Performer (in recognition of each participating team's Player of the Game) in those three contests. Starting with 24 points in a 72–71 triumph versus the Calgary Dinos, she would follow it up with 23 points and 17 rebounds in a convincing 69–55 win versus the UPEI Panthers. In the gold medal game, marking the program's first appearance in the national championship game, she registered 21 points in an 82–64 loss versus the Saskatchewan Huskies women's basketball program.

In the 2020 U Sports National Championship Game, Samantha Keltos had 21 points, two rebounds and one assist. For her efforts, she was recognized as the Player of the Game for Brock.

In the aftermath of the season, the Badgers were recognized as the 2019–20 OUA Female Team of the Year, an historic first in program history.

== U Sports Elite 8 results ==
Year	Seed	Round	Opponent	Result
1983	N/A	First Round; Semi-Finals	Winnipeg Wesmen; Bishop's Gaiters	W 47–46; L 42–60
1987	N/A	First Round; Consolation Semi-Finals	Laurentian Voyageurs; Toronto Varsity Blues	L 50–80; L 53–84
2002	N/A	First Round; Consolation Semi-Finals; Consolation Finals	Laval Rouge et Or; Toronto Varsity Blues; Memorial Sea-Hawks	L 55–74; W 75–67; L 67–75
2012	N/A	CIS West Semi-Final; CIS West Final	Saskatchewan Huskies; Regina Cougars	W 66–62; L 62–85
2020	#2	First Round; Semi-Finals; Finals	#7 Calgary Dinos #6 UPEI Panthers #1 Saskatchewan Huskies	W 72–71; W 69–55; L 82–61
2022	#4	First Round; Semi-Finals; Bronze Medal Game	#5 Acadia Axewomen #1 Ryerson Rams #7 Queen's Gaels	W 85–74; L 56–64; L 57–75

== Individual leader scoring ==
Legend
GP	Games played	GS	Games started	MIN	Minutes played
FG	Field-goals	3FG	3-point field-goals	FT	Free-throws
PTS	Points	AVG	Points per game

Season	Player	GP	Min	FG	3FG	FT	Pts	Avg	OUA rank
2019–20	Melissa Tatti	21	758	126	48	90	390	18.6	1st
2018–19	Melissa Tatti	24	902	137	42	72	388	16.2	3rd
2017–18	Kristin Gallant	17	483	68	1	85	222	13.1	10th
2016–17									
2015–16									
2014–15									
2013–14									
2012–13	Nicole Rosenkranz	22	640	137	0	64	338	15.4	7th
2011–12	Nicole Rosenkranz	22	569	110	0	86	306	13.9	9th
2010–11	Whitney Gorges	22	686	104	59	52	319	14.5	7th
2009–10	Whitney Gorges	22	670	93	40	57	283	12.9	12th

== Statistical leaders ==
During the 2019–20 OUA season, Melissa Tatti would lead the conference with 18.6 points per game. In the same season, Tatti set the Brock record for most points in a single season, amassing 407 in 21 games.

== International ==
- Candi Jirik Canada: 1982 World Championships in Brazil, 1983 Pan American Games in Venezuela.

== Awards and honours ==
- Mike Rao: 2020 St. Catharines Sportsperson of the Year
- Samantha Keltos and Melissa Tatti: 2020 St. Catharines Athletes of the Year
- Diane Hilko: St Catharine's Sports Hall of Fame Inductee (Class of 2017)

=== Team Awards ===
==== Most Valuable Player ====
The team's Most Valuable Player is awarded the TJ Kearney Award.

- 1998–99: Shannon Hann
- 1999-00: Shannon Hann
- 2000–01: Shannon Hann
- 2019–20: Melissa Tatti

==== Rookie of the Year ====
- 2019–20: Kyanna Thompson

=== OUA Awards ===
- 2019–20 OUA Player of the Year: Melissa Tatti
- 2020 OUA Female Team of the Year

==== OUA All-Stars ====
First Team

- 2019–20 OUA First-Team All-Star: Melissa Tatti
- 2019–20 OUA Second Team All-Star: Samantha Keltos
- 2016–17 OUA First Team: Kira Cornelissen

Second Team

- 2018–19 OUA Second-Team All-Star: Melissa Tatti
- 2016–17 Second Team: Bridget Atkinson

==== OUA Women’s Basketball Showcase ====
- 2019 Showcase Participant: Melissa Tatti (named to Team Burns)
- 2018 Showcase Participant: Kristin Gallant (named to Team Burns)

=== U Sports Awards ===
- 2019–20 Peter Ennis Award awarded to the Coach of the Year
- 2019–20 U SPORTS First Team All-Canadian Melissa Tatti
- U SPORTS Female Athlete of the Month (March 2020): Samantha Keltos
- Samantha Keltos, U Sports Female Athlete of the Week (awarded Wednesday, March 4, 2020)

==== U Sports Nationals ====
- 2020 U Sports National Championship Game – Nike Top Performers: Samantha Keltos, Brock
- 2020 U Sports National Championship All-Star Team: Melissa Tatti, Brock
- 2020 U Sports National Championship All-Star Team: Samantha Keltos, Brock

=== University Awards ===
- Mike Rao, 2020 Wally Barrow Memorial Coach of the Year Award.
- Brock Badgers Athletics 2019–20 Female Team of the Year

==== Athlete of the Week ====
- Jessica Morris, Brock Badgers Female Athlete of the Week (awarded November 18, 2019)
- Samantha Keltos, Brock Badgers Female Athlete of the Week (awarded February 17, 2020 and March 2, 2020)
- Miranda Smith, Brock Badgers Athlete of the Week (December 3, 2018)
- Melissa Tatti, Brock Badgers Female Athlete of the Week (awarded November 4, 2019, January 13, 2020, January 27, 2020 and February 10, 2020)

==== Brock Badgers Hall of Fame ====
- Class of 2005 Inductee: 1982–83 Brock Women's Basketball Team
- Class of 2005 Inductee: Maureen Kelly
- Class of 2003 Inductee: Michele Luke
- Class of 2001 Inductee: Diane Hilko
- Class of 1996 Inductee: Candi Jirik
