= Lisa Thomaidis =

Canadian basketball coach

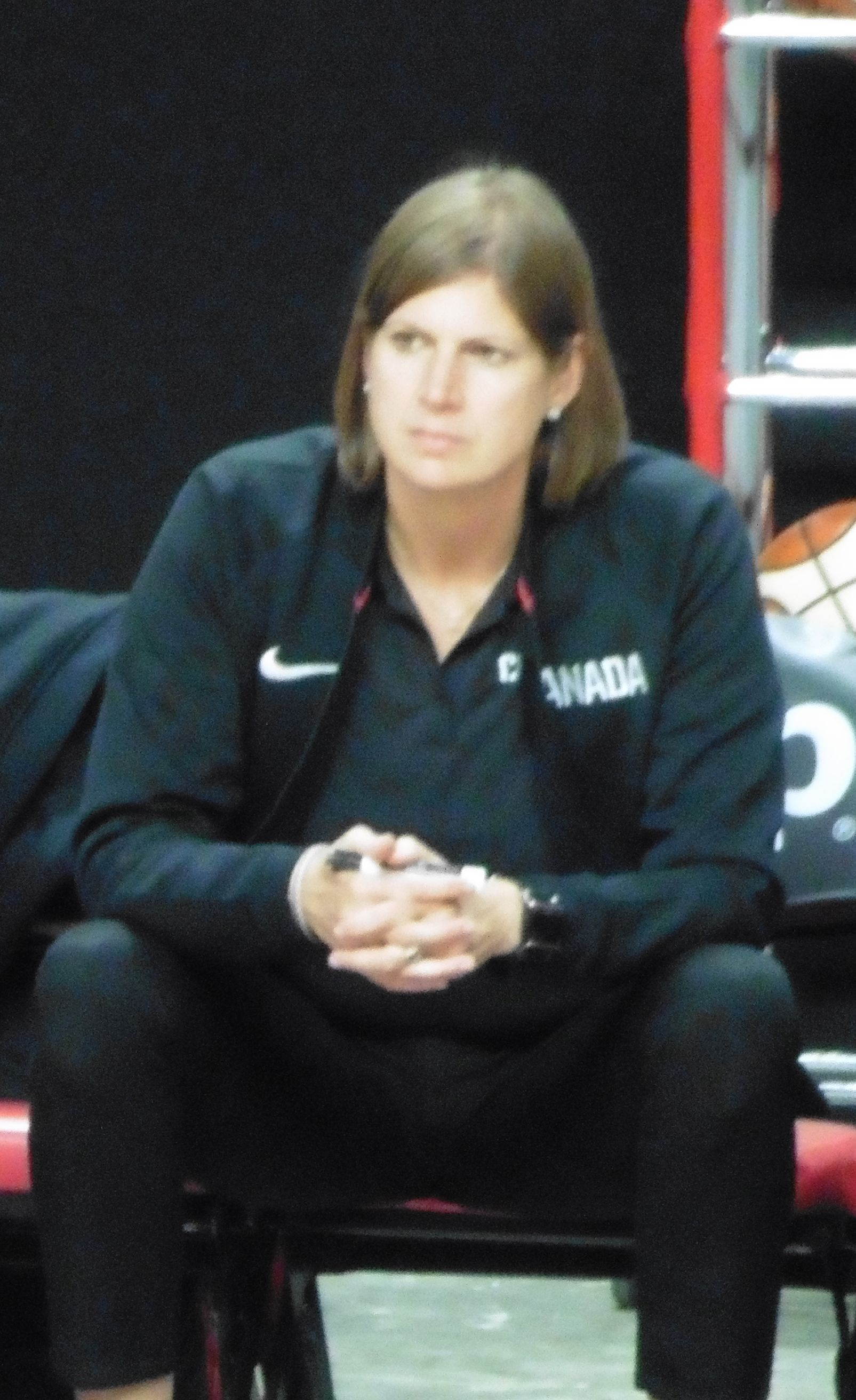

Personal information
- Born: 23 July 1972 (age 54) Dundas, Ontario, Canada
- Listed height: 6 ft 2 in (1.88 m)

Career information
- High school: Highland Secondary (Dundas, Ontario)
- College: McMaster University (1990–1995)
- Coaching career: Saskatchewan Huskies 1998–present

Career history
- 1996–1998: Apollon Ptolemaidas

Lisa Thomaidis (born July 23, 1972) is a Greek-Canadian basketball coach who is the head coach of the Saskatchewan Huskies women's basketball program. She is a four-time national champion as a head coach after leading the Huskies to wins in 2016, 2020, 2025, and 2026. She was also the head coach for the Canada women's national basketball team from 2014 to September, 2021, and of the German women's national team from April 2023 to October 2025.

== Early life and education ==
Thomaidis went to McMaster University to study kinesiology and joined the university's women's basketball team. After moving to Greece and play for Apollon Ptolemaidas, an injury ended her basketball career and led her to coaching.

== Career ==
Starting in 1998, Thomaidis began coaching women's basketball at the University of Saskatchewan. Throughout her career as coach for the Saskatchewan Huskies, she led the team to multiple Canada West titles, with their first championship win in 2006. In 2025-26, she coached the team to their second-ever perfect regular season in program history. Outside the University of Saskatchewan, Thomaidis was an assistant coach for Canada women's national basketball team from 2002 to 2013, which included a quarter final performance at the 2012 Summer Olympics.

=== Head coach ===
In 2013, she replaced Allison McNeill as head coach and her team won silver at the 2013 FIBA Americas Championship for Women. Following her promotion, Thomaidis led Canada's women's basketball team to a fifth-place finish at the 2014 FIBA World Championship for Women and a gold medal at the 2015 Pan American Games. Thomaidis's team came in seventh at the 2016 Summer Olympics and won a gold medal at the 2017 FIBA Women's AmeriCup.

In April 2023, she was appointed head coach of the German women's national team. On October 10, 2025, it was announced that she was no longer head coach of Germany, departing the role in order to focus on coaching at the University of Saskatchewan.

In February 2026, Thomaidis was named the Canada West women’s basketball coach of the year for the third season in a row, following a season in which the Huskies maintained an unbeaten regular season and achieved a winning streak of 51 games. She coached the Huskies to a second consecutive Bronze Baby following a 77-68 win over the UNB Reds in the final on March 8, 2026.

== Awards and honours ==
During her university basketball coaching career, Thomaidis has been named coach of the year multiple times by Canadian Interuniversity Sport and Canada West. In 2006, Thomaidis was inducted into the McMaster Athletics Hall of Fame. Thomaidis was also named best coach of 2015 at the Petro-Canada Sport Leadership Awards and the Saskatchewan Sports Awards.

- Canada West Coach of the Year - 2004, 2006, 2009, 2011, 2016, 2023 and 2026.
- Colb McEwon Trophy: 2006, 2009, 2011, 2016, 2020, 2024, 2025, and 2026. (Saskatchewan Huskies Athletics Coach of the Year) - Lisa Thomaidis
- Peter Ennis Award: 2009, 2011, 2023 and 2026.
- 2016 CAAWS Women of Influence Award

== Personal life ==
Her father Christos was born at Mesochori in Florina, Greece.
