= 2024 U Sports Women's Basketball Championship =

Canadian university basketball championship

2024 U Sports Women's Final 8
- Season: 2023–24
- Teams: Eight
- Finals site: Saville Centre; Edmonton, Alberta
- Champions: Carleton Ravens (3rd title)
- Runner-up: Saskatchewan Huskies
- Winning coach: Dani Sinclair (2nd title)
- Tournament MVP: Kali Pocrnic (Carleton Ravens)
- Television: CBC, TVA

The 2024 U Sports Women's Final 8 Basketball Tournament was held March 7–10, 2024, in Edmonton, Alberta, to determine a national champion for the 2023–24 U Sports women's basketball season. It was officially called the 2024 U SPORTS Women's Final 8 presented by The Westin Edmonton. The Carleton Ravens repeated as national champions, defeating the Saskatchewan Huskies 70-67. The Ravens defended their 2023 title, and took their third overall championship.

== Host ==
The tournament was hosted by the University of Alberta at the school's Saville Centre, with a seating capacity of 2,600 for basketball. This was the first time the championship game was played at this venue, and the third time overall that the game was hosted by the University of Alberta. Alberta also hosted the 2000 and 2001 championship tournaments.

== Participating teams ==
Seed	Team	Qualified	Record	Last	Total
1	Saskatchewan Huskies	Canada West Champion	19–1	2020	2
2	Carleton Ravens	OUA Champion	21–1	2023	2
3	Saint Mary's Huskies	AUS Champion	17–3	None	0
4	Laval Rouge et Or	RSEQ Champion	16–0	None	0
5	Alberta Pandas	Canada West Finalist (Host)	14–6	1999	1
6	Queen's Gaels	OUA Finalist	18–4	None	0
7	UFV Cascades	Canada West Bronze	17–3	None	0
8	Calgary Dinos	Canada West Quarterfinalist (At-large berth)	16–4	1989	1

== Championship bracket ==
The tournament began on Mountain Standard Time. Clocks changed to Mountain Daylight Time ahead of games on March 10.

First Round: March 7
1	Saskatchewan Huskies	85
8	Calgary Dinos	54
4	Laval Rouge et Or	65
5	Alberta Pandas	57
2	Carleton Ravens	75
7	UFV Cascades	58
3	Saint Mary's Huskies	55
6	Queen's Gaels	69

Semi-Finals: March 9
1	Saskatchewan Huskies	64
4	Laval Rouge et Or	57
2	Carleton Ravens	74
6	Queen's Gaels	40

Gold Medal Game: March 10
1	Saskatchewan Huskies	67
2	Carleton Ravens	70
Bronze Medal Game: March 10
4	Laval Rouge et Or	76
6	Queen's Gaels	62

== Consolation bracket ==
Semi-Finals: March 8
3	Saint Mary's Huskies	69
7	UFV Cascades	42
5	Alberta Pandas	65
8	Calgary Dinos	59

Fifth Place Game: March 9
3	Saint Mary's Huskies	65
5	Alberta Pandas	62
