= 2025 U Sports Women's Basketball Championship =

Canadian university basketball championship

2025 U Sports Women's Final 8
- Season: 2024–25
- Teams: Eight
- Finals site: Doug Mitchell Thunderbird Sports Centre; UBC War Memorial Gymnasium; Vancouver, British Columbia
- Champions: Saskatchewan Huskies (3rd title)
- Runner-up: Carleton Ravens
- Winning coach: Lisa Thomaidis (3rd title)
- Championship MVP: Gage Grassick (Saskatchewan)
- Television: CBC

The 2025 U Sports Women's Final 8 Basketball Tournament was held March 13–16, 2025, in Vancouver, British Columbia, to determine a national champion for the 2024–25 U Sports women's basketball season. The top-seeded Saskatchewan Huskies defeated the two-time defending champion Carleton Ravens 85–66 to claim the program's third national championship.

== Host ==
The tournament was hosted by the University of British Columbia at the school's Doug Mitchell Thunderbird Sports Centre and UBC War Memorial Gymnasium. It was also held concurrently with the 2025 U Sports Men's Basketball Championship, hence the necessity for two venues, which is also the first time in U Sports history that both tournaments were hosted by one school in the same year. This was the first time that UBC has hosted the tournament.

== Participating teams ==
The seeding for teams was announced on March 9, 2025, with the Laval Rouge et Or being awarded the at-large berth.

Seed	Team	Qualified	Record	Last	Total
1	Saskatchewan Huskies	Canada West Champion	18–2	2020	2
2	Ottawa Gee-Gees	OUA Champion	19–3	None	0
3	Carleton Ravens	OUA Finalists	22–0	2024	3
4	Saint Mary's Huskies	AUS Champion	18–2	None	0
5	UBC Thunderbirds	Canada West Finalist (Host)	18–2	2008	6
6	Bishop's Gaiters	RSEQ Champion	11–5	1984	2
7	Laval Rouge et Or	RSEQ Finalist (At-large berth)	14–2	None	0
8	Alberta Pandas	Canada West Bronze	18–2	1999	1

== Championship bracket ==
First Round: March 13
1	Saskatchewan Huskies	67
8	Alberta Pandas	58
4	Saint Mary's Huskies	50
5	UBC Thunderbirds	55
2	Ottawa Gee-Gees	70 (OT)
7	Laval Rouge et Or	67
3	Carleton Ravens	71
6	Bishop's Gaiters	44

Semi-Finals: March 15
1	Saskatchewan Huskies	85
5	UBC Thunderbirds	63
2	Ottawa Gee-Gees	60
3	Carleton Ravens	84

Gold Medal Game: March 16
1	Saskatchewan Huskies	85
3	Carleton Ravens	66
Bronze Medal Game: March 16
2	Ottawa Gee-Gees	68
5	UBC Thunderbirds	61

== Consolation bracket ==
Semi-Finals: March 14
4	Saint Mary's Huskies	61
8	Alberta Pandas	68
6	Bishop's Gaiters	61
7	Laval Rouge et Or	63

Fifth Place Game: March 15
7	Laval Rouge et Or	38
8	Alberta Pandas	64
