= UPEI Panthers women's basketball =

Women's university basketball team

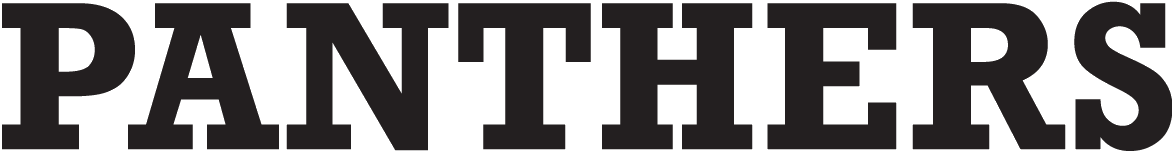
- University: University of Prince Edward Island
- Head coach: Matt Gamblin
- Location: Charlottetown, Prince Edward Island
- Arena: Chi Wan Young Sport Centre
- Conference: AUS
- Nickname: Panthers
- Colors: Green and black

U Sports tournament appearances
- 1987, 1988, 1989, 1992, 1993, 1998, 2020,2022

Conference tournament champions
- 1987, 1988, 1989, 1993, 1998, 2020

Conference regular-season champions
- 2020

The UPEI Panthers women's basketball team represents the University of Prince Edward Island in the Atlantic University Sport conference of U Sports women's basketball. The Panthers have the fourth-most Atlantic Conference Championships (six), with their most recent for the 2019–20 season. The 2019–20 team also won the bronze medal at the 2020 U Sports Women's Basketball Championship.

== History ==
During the 2019–20 regular season, UPEI finished in first place in AUS play, enjoying a 17–3 record. Jenna Mae Ellsworth emerged as the Panthers top scorer, averaging 20.5 points per game. In addition, Ellsworth averaged 5.9 rebounds, 3.2 assists and 2.1 steals per game. By season's end, she reached 1,231 career points, enabling her in a second-place on the Panthers all-time scoring list. Winning the Nann Copp Award, Ellsworth became just the third Atlantic University Sport conference player to be recognized.

In the postseason, the Panthers captured the Subway AUS Women's Basketball Championship, representing its first postseason conference title since the 1997-98 campaign. Qualifying for the U Sports Elite 8, the Panthers were the sixth seed. Defeating the third-seeded Ryerson Rams in the opening round, the Panthers played for the bronze medal. Defeating the Laval Rouge et Or by a 57–50 final, Ellsworth recorded 24 points and nine rebounds in the victory.

=== U Sports Elite 8 results ===
Year	Seed	Round	Opponent	Result
1987	NA	Quarter-Finals; Consolation Semi-Finals; 5th Place Game	Victoria Vikettes; Laval Rouge et Or; Toronto Varsity Blues	L 60–83; W 66–62; L 48–60
1988	NA	Quarter-Finals; Semi-Finals; Bronze Medal Game	Toronto Varsity Blues; Calgary Dinosaurs; Victoria Vikettes	W 66–59; L 60–73; L 55–60
1989	NA	Quarter-Finals; Semi-Finals; Gold Medal Game	Regina Cougars; Victoria Vikettes; Calgary Dinosaurs	W 82–80; W 68–58; L 55–92
1992	NA	Quarter-Finals; Consolation Semi-Finals	Victoria Vikes; Manitoba Bisons	L 39–69; L 71–73
1993	NA	Quarter-Finals; Consolation Semi-Finals	Winnipeg Wesmen; Toronto Varsity Blues	L 80–96; L 58–82
1998	NA	Quarter-Finals; Consolation Semi-Finals	Victoria Vikes; Concordia Stingers	L 52–71; L 66–74
2020	#6	First Round; Semi-Finals; Bronze Medal Game	#3 Ryerson Rams #2 Brock Badgers #4 Laval Rouge et Or	W 75–70; L 55–69; W 57–50

=== Individual Leader Scoring ===
Legend
GP	Games played	MIN/G	Minutes per game	FG/G	Field-goals per game
PCT	Percentage	3PT/G	3-point field-goals per game	FT/G	Free-throws per game
PPG	Points per game

Season	Player	GP	MIN/G	FG/G	PCT	3PT/G	PCT	FT/G	PCT	PPG	AUS rank
2019-20	Jenna Mae Ellsworth	17	32.1	7.1-16.1	44.3	1.4-3.9	36.4	4.8-6.3	76.6	20.5	3rd
2018-19	Jenna Mae Ellsworth	20	31.9	5.9-13.4	43.9	0.7-2.6	26.9	4.2-5.2	81.6	16.7	5th
2017-18	Kiera Rigby	20	31.7	6.0-13.8	43.5	1.1-3.0	36.7	5.3-6.8	78.1	18.4	3rd
2016-17	Jenna Mae Ellsworth	18	35.9	5.0-11.4	43.7	0.9-2.8	34.0	3.2-4.2	76.0	14.1	5th

== Awards and honours ==
Jenna Mae Ellsworth would win the 2020 Nan Copp Award, recognizing U Sports Player of the Year. During the same month, Ellsworth was also named to the list of the Top 100 U Sports Women's Basketball Players of the Century (2011–2020).

=== AUS Awards ===
- 2019-20 AUS Female Athlete of the Year: Jenna Mae Ellsworth

==== Player of the Year ====
- 1985-86 Paula Edwards
- 1998-99 Jennifer Johnston
- 2020 AUS Player of the Year: Jenna Mae Ellsworth

==== Defensive Player of the Year ====
- 2017-18: Carolina Del Santo, UPEI
- 2018-19: Carolina Del Santo
- 2019-20: Jenna Mae Ellsworth

==== Rookie of the Year ====
- 1984-85 Paula Edwards
- 2016-17 Jenna Mae Ellsworth
- 2017-18 Reese Baxendale

==== Student-Athlete Community Service Award ====
- 2017-18: Kiera Rigby

==== Tracey MacLeod Award Nominee ====
- 2013-14: Jenna Jones
- 2017-18: Jane McLaughlin

==== Regular Season Scoring Champions ====
- 2006-07: M.A. Campbell, (17.7 PPG)
- 1998-99: Jennifer Johnston, (20.1 PPG)

==== Coach of the Year ====
The Coach of the Year in Atlantic University Sport is given the Carolyn Savoy Trophy

- 1980-81: George Morrison Co-winner
- 1983-84: Dave MacNeill
- 1985-86 Dave MacNeill
- 1986-87 Dave MacNeill
- 1987-88: Dave MacNeill
- 1991-92: Dave MacNeill
- 1992-93: Dave MacNeill
- 1996-97: Tracy Ellsworth

==== AUS All-Stars ====
First Team

- 2017-18 AUS First Team All-Star: Kiera Rigby
- 2019-20 AUS First Team All-Star: Jenna Mae Ellsworth, Reese Baxendale

Second Team

- 2018-19 AUS Second Team All-Star: Jenna Mae Ellsworth
- 2017-18 AUS Second Team All-Star: Jenna Mae Ellsworth
- 2016-17 AUS Second Team All-Star: Jenna Mae Ellsworth

==== AUS All-Rookie Team ====
- 2016-17 All-Rookie team: Jenna Mae Ellsworth

2017-18 Reese Baxendale

==== Tournament All-Stars ====
- 2017-18 AUS Women's Basketball Championship All-Star: Reese Baxendale
- 2017-18 AUS Women's Basketball Championship All-Star: Jenna Mae Ellsworth
- 2020 Subway AUS Women's Basketball Championship All-Tournament Team: Jenna Mae Ellsworth, Reese Baxendale (Tournament MVP)

=== U Sports Awards ===
- 2020 Nan Copp Award: Jenna Mae Ellsworth
- Top 100 U Sports women's basketball Players of the Century (1920–2020): Jenna Mae Ellsworth
- 2017-18 U Sports Sylvia Sweeney Community Service Award: Kiera Rigby

==== U Sports National Tournament ====
- Nike Top Performers - March 8, 2020 - Bronze Medal Game: UPEI vs. Laval - UPEI: Reese Baxendale

==== All-Canadian ====
- 2019-20 U SPORTS First Team All-Canadian: Jenna Mae Ellsworth

=== University Awards ===
PEI Panthers Passion for Life Award (in memory of former UPEI soccer player Rene Ayangma)

- 2016-17: Kiera Rigby

==== PEI Panthers Female Athlete of the Year ====
- 2014-15: Amy Gough
- 2015-16: Katelynn Donahoe Co-winner
- 2017-18: Kiera Rigby
- 2019-20: Jenna Mae Ellsworth

==== J.T. 'Mickey' Place Awards ====
Presented by the UPEI Student Union to student-athletes who have made a contribution to student leadership on their team and on campus.

- 2014-15: Darcy Zinck
- 2015-16: Katie Donahoe
- 2016-17: Kiera Rigby
- 2017-18:
- 2018-19: Carolina Del Santo

==== Most Valuable Player ====
- 2014-15: Amy Gough
- 2015-16: Katie Donahoe
- 2016-17: Kiera Rigby
- 2017-18:
- 2018-19: Jenna Mae Ellsworth

==== Rookie of the Year ====
- 2015-16: Kendra Craswell and Jennifer Newman
- 2016-17: Jenna Mae Ellsworth
- 2017-18: Reese Baxendale
- 2018-19: Carolina Del Santo

=== PEI Panthers Hall of Fame ===
- 2001 inductee: Paula Edwards
- 2002 inductee: UPEI Women's Basketball team 1988-1989
- 2003 inductee: Tracy MacEachern
- 2012 inductee: Jennifer Johnston
