= 2019 U Sports Women's Basketball Championship =

Canadian university basketball championship

- Season: 2018-19
- Teams: Eight
- Finals site: Mattamy Athletic Centre; Toronto, Ontario
- Champions: McMaster Marauders (1st title)
- Runner-up: Laval Rouge et Or

The 2019 U Sports Women's Basketball Championship was held March 7–10, 2019, in Toronto, Ontario, to determine a national champion for the 2018–19 U Sports women's basketball season. It was hosted by Ryerson University at the Mattamy Athletic Centre at the Gardens, which was the first time that Ryerson had hosted the championship game. The McMaster Marauders won the gold medal and earned the first Bronze Baby Championship in program history.

== Participating teams ==
Seed	Team	Qualified
1	Laval Rouge et Or	RSEQ Champion
2	McMaster Marauders	OUA Champion
3	Saskatchewan Huskies	Canada West Champion
4	Ottawa Gee-Gees	OUA Finalist
5	Regina Cougars	Canada West Finalist
6	Acadia Axewomen	AUS Champion
7	Concordia Stingers	RSEQ Finalist (At-large berth)
8	Ryerson Rams	OUA Quarterfinalist (Host)

== Championship Bracket ==
First Round: March 7
1	Laval Rouge et Or	73
8	Ryerson Rams	51
4	Ottawa Gee-Gees	65
5	Regina Cougars	63
2	McMaster Marauders	86
7	Concordia Stingers	68
3	Saskatchewan Huskies	77
6	Acadia Axewomen	69

Semi-Finals: March 9
1	Laval Rouge et Or	60
4	Ottawa Gee-Gees	56
2	McMaster Marauders	73
3	Saskatchewan Huskies	66

Final: March 10
1	Laval Rouge et Or	58
2	McMaster Marauders	70
Bronze Medal Game: March 10
3	Saskatchewan Huskies	62
4	Ottawa Gee-Gees	63

== Consolation Bracket ==
Semi-Finals: March 8
5	Regina Cougars	45
8	Ryerson Rams	63
6	Acadia Axewomen	86
7	Concordia Stingers	74

Fifth Place Game: March 10
6	Acadia Axewomen	67
8	Ryerson Rams	91
