= 2023 U Sports Women's Basketball Championship =

Canadian university basketball championship

2023 U Sports Women's Final 8
- Season: 2022–23
- Teams: Eight
- Finals site: Sullivan Field House; Sydney, Nova Scotia
- Champions: Carleton Ravens (2nd title)
- Runner-up: Queen's Gaels
- Winning coach: Dani Sinclair (1st title)
- Tournament MVP: Kali Pocrnic (Carleton)
- Television: CBC

The 2023 U Sports Women's Final 8 Basketball Tournament was held March 9–12, 2023, in Sydney, Nova Scotia, to determine a national champion for the 2022–23 U Sports women's basketball season. The top-seeded Carleton Ravens defeated the third-seeded Queen's Gaels in the gold medal game to win the second national championship in program history. Both the Carleton women's and men's teams won the national titles in basketball this season, something no school had accomplished since 1985, when the Victoria Vikes were double champions.

== Host ==
The tournament was hosted by Cape Breton University at the school's Sullivan Field House, which was the first time that Cape Breton had hosted the championship game. It was the second time that the tournament was played in Nova Scotia and the first time since 1980 when it was hosted by Dalhousie University.

== Participating teams ==
Seed	Team	Qualified	Record	Last	Total
1	Carleton Ravens	OUA Champion	19–3	2018	1
2	Alberta Pandas	Canada West Champion	15–5	1999	1
3	Queen's Gaels	OUA Finalist	21–1	None	0
4	Saint Mary's Huskies	AUS Champion	15–5	None	0
5	Calgary Dinos	Canada West Finalist	13–7	1989	1
6	UQAM Citadins	RSEQ Champion	9–7	None	0
7	Acadia Axewomen	AUS Finalist (At-large berth)	16–3	None	0
8	CBU Capers	AUS Quarterfinalist (Host)	9–11	None	0

== Championship bracket ==
First Round: March 9
1	Carleton Ravens	56
8	Cape Breton Capers	51
4	Saint Mary's Huskies	70
5	Calgary Dinos	68
2	Alberta Pandas	61
7	Acadia Axewomen	57
3	Queen's Gaels	75
6	UQAM Citadins	72

Semi-Finals: March 11
1	Carleton Ravens	65
4	Saint Mary's Huskies	46
2	Alberta Pandas	62
3	Queen's Gaels	72

Gold Medal Game: March 12
1	Carleton Ravens	71
3	Queen's Gaels	59
Bronze Medal Game: March 12
2	Alberta Pandas	64
4	Saint Mary's Huskies	49

== Consolation bracket ==
Semi-Finals: March 10
5	Calgary Dinos	87
8	Cape Breton Capers	61
6	UQAM Citadins	56
7	Acadia Axewomen	74

Fifth Place Game: March 12
5	Calgary Dinos	76
7	Acadia Axewomen	78
