= Regina Cougars women's ice hockey =

Regina Cougars women's ice hockey program

- University: University of Regina
- Conference: Canada West
- Governing Body: U Sports
- Head coach: Brandy West-McMaster (interim); 1st season
- Arena: The Co-operators Centre; Regina, Saskatchewan
- Colors: Green and Gold
- Mascot: Reggie the Cougar and Ram-page

U Sports tournament appearances
- 2001, 2002, 2003

Conference tournament champions
- 2001

The Regina Cougars women's ice hockey program is a college ice hockey program that represents the University of Regina in the Canada West Universities Athletic Association conference of U Sports women's ice hockey. Brandy West-McMaster has served as interim head coach of the program since February 2024.

== History ==
Sarah Hodges served as head coach of the Regina Cougars women's ice hockey program from its inaugural season in 1998–99 through the 2023–24 season, and became the Canada West all-time leader in regular season games coached, with 588. She was named Canada West Coach of the Year following the 2015–16 season.

=== Season-by-season results ===
This is a partial list of the most recent seasons completed by the Regina Cougars women's ice hockey program.
Note: Finish = Conference rank at end of regular season; GP = Games played, W = Wins (3 points), OTW = Overtime wins (2 points), OTL = Overtime losses (1 point), L = Losses, GF = Goals for, GA = Goals against, Pts = Points, Top scorer: Points (Goals+Assists)

Won championship	Lost championship	Conference champions	League leader

Season	Head coach	Regular season										Conference tournament results
Season	Head coach	Finish	GP	W	OTW	OTL	L	GF	GA	Pts	Top scorer	Conference tournament results
2015-16	Sarah Hodges	3rd	28	12	5	1	10	71	66	47	Kylie Gavelin, 27 (11+16)	Canada West semifinal loss to UBC Thunderbirds, 1–2
2016-17	Sarah Hodges	5th	28	10	4	1	13	62	65	39	Jaycee Magwood, 24 (12+12)	Canada West quarterfinal loss to Saskatchewan Huskies, 0–2
2017-18	Sarah Hodges	5th	28	8	2	4	14	44	64	32	Emma Waldenberger, 18 (8+10)	Canada West quarterfinal loss to Alberta Pandas, 0–2
2018-19	Sarah Hodges	6th	28	9	2	3	14	45	74	34	Emma Waldenberger, 17 (10+7)	Canada West quarterfinal loss to UBC Thunderbirds, 0–2
2019-20	Sarah Hodges	5th	28	9	5	1	13	48	54	38	Jaycee Magwood, 21 (11+10)	Canada West quarterfinal loss to Mount Royal Cougars, 0–2
2020-21	Sarah Hodges	Season cancelled due to COVID-19 pandemic										
2021-22	Sarah Hodges	6th	20	8	–	2	10	38	54	18	Lilla Carpenter-Boesch, 19 (10+9)	Canada West quarterfinal loss to Alberta Pandas, 0–2
2022-23	Sarah Hodges	9th	28	4	–	2	22	34	85	10	Jenna Merk, 13 (3+10)	Did not qualify
2023-24	Sarah Hodges	8th	28	7	–	2	19	40	83	16	Paige Hubbard, 17 (6+11)	Did not qualify
2024-25	Brandy West-McMaster	6th	28	11	2	3	12	45	62	27	Paige Hubbard, 12 (8+4)	Canada West quarterfinal loss to Mount Royal Cougars, 0–2

=== All-time scoring leaders ===
Rank	Player	G	A	PTS	Class of
1	Brandy West	72	45	117	2002
2	Erin Tady	48	54	102	2004
3	Jaycee Magwood	48	53	101	2019
4	Elysia Cobbledick	52	45	97	2006
5	Rianne Wight	51	44	95	2012
6	Paige Wheeler	46	43	89	2012
7	Kelsey Rezansoff	34	54	88	2004
8	Kylie Gavelin	39	45	84	2016
9	Julie Foster	30	52	82	2002
10	Emma Waldenberger	44	37	81	2018
11	Joell Fiddler	21	59	80	2003
12	Kara McGeough	33	43	76	2008
13	Kelsie Graham	26	50	76	2009
14	Kelcie McCutcheon	30	46	76	2010
15	Karissa Swan	35	32	67	2007

== Awards and honours ==
- Toni Ross, 2016 Hockey Canada Isobel Gathorne-Hardy Award

=== CIS/USports Awards ===
- Brandy West: 2000-01 Brodrick Trophy (awarded to the CIS Player of the Year)
- Erin Tady, CIS Rookie of the Year (2001)
- Karissa Swan, CIS Rookie of the Year (2006)

==== All-Canadians ====
- Joell Fiddler, CIS Second Team All-Canadian (2005)
- Arielle Schade, CIS All-Canadians (2006–07)
- Brandy West, CIS All-Canadian (1999-2000, 2000–01, 2001–02)

==== All-Rookie Team ====
- Erin Tady, CIS All-Rookie Team (2001)
- Karissa Swan, CIS All-Rookie Team (2006)
- Alexis Larson, CIS All-Rookie Team (2013)

=== Canada West honours ===
- Sarah Hodges, Canada West Coach of the Year in 2015-16
- Brandy West-McMaster, Canada West Coach of the Year in 2024-25
- Jane Kish, Canada West First Star of the Week (awarded January 14, 2020)

==== Canada West Player of the Year ====
- Brandy West, Canada West Player of the Year (1999, 2000, 2001)

==== Canada West Rookie of the Year ====
- Brandy West, Canada West Rookie of the Year (1999)
- Erin Tady, CIS Rookie of the Year (2001)
- Karissa Swan, CIS Rookie of the Year (2006)
- Jaycee Magwood, Canada West Rookie of the Year (2016)
- Jules Stokes, Canada West Rookie of the Year (2025)

==== Canada West All-Stars ====
- Brandy West, Canada West First-Team All-Star (1999, 2000, 2001)
- Rianne Wight, 2012-13 Canada West Second Tea
- Jaycee Magwood, 2019-20 Canada West Second-Team All-Star
- Tamara McVannel, 2019-20 Canada West Second-Team All-Star

==== Canada West All-Rookie ====
- Jaycee Magwood, 2015-16 U Sports All-Rookie Team
- Jordan Kulbida, 2017-18 Canada West All-Rookie Team
- Paige Hubbard, 2019-20 Canada West All-Rookie Team
- Amy Swayze, 2025-26 Canada West All-Rookie Team

=== University Awards ===
- 2019-20 Regina Cougars Female Rookie of the Year: Paige Hubbard

==== University of Regina Sports Hall of Fame ====
- Brandy West was the first Regina Cougars women's hockey player to be inducted into the University of Regina Sports Hall of Fame, gaining induction in 2011.

== International ==
- Kylie Gavelin, Forward Canada: 2017 Winter Universiade (silver)
- Alexis Larson, Defense Canada: 2017 Winter Universiade (silver)
- Jaycee Magwood, Forward Canada: 2017 Winter Universiade (silver)

== Cougars in professional hockey ==
As of March 2022

= CWHL All-Star	= NWHL All-Star	= Clarkson Cup Champion	= Isobel Cup Champion

Player	Position	Team(s)	League(s)	Years	Titles
Jaycee Magwood	Forward	MODO Hockey	SDHL	3	
Toni Ross	Goaltender	Calgary Inferno	CWHL	1	
