= 2016 CIS Women's Basketball Championship =

Canadian university basketball championship

- Season: 2015-16
- Teams: Eight
- Finals site: Richard J. Currie Centre; Fredericton, New Brunswick
- Champions: Saskatchewan Huskies (1st title)
- Runner-up: Ryerson Rams

The 2016 CIS Women's Basketball Championship was held March 17–20, 2016, in Fredericton, New Brunswick, to determine a national champion for the 2015–16 CIS women's basketball season. It was hosted by University of New Brunswick at the Richard J. Currie Centre.

This proved to be the last Women's Final 8 branded as a CIS championship. On October 20, 2016, Canadian Interuniversity Sport, the country's governing body for university athletics and the organizer of the Final 8, changed its name to U Sports.

== Participating teams ==
Seed	Team	Qualified
1	McGill Martlets	Quebec University Champion
2	Saskatchewan Huskies	Canada West Champion
3	Saint Mary's Huskies	Atlantic University Champion
4	Regina Cougars	Canada West Finalist
5	Ryerson Rams	Ontario University Champion
6	Alberta Pandas	Canada West Bronze Medalist
7	Ottawa Gee-Gees	Ontario University Finalist
8	UNB Varsity Reds	Host (Atlantic University Semi-Finalist)

== Championship Bracket ==
First Round: March 17
1	McGill Martlets	58
8	UNB Varsity Reds	52
4	Regina Cougars	70
5	Ryerson Rams	73
2	Saskatchewan Huskies	73
7	Ottawa Gee-Gees	62
3	Saint Mary's Huskies	53
6	Alberta Pandas	52

Semi-Finals: March 14
1	McGill Martlets	72
5	Ryerson Rams	87
2	Saskatchewan Huskies	65
3	Saint Mary's Huskies	58

Final: March 15
2	Saskatchewan Huskies	85
5	Ryerson Rams	71
Bronze Medal Game: March 20
1	McGill Martlets	43
3	Saint Mary's Huskies	73

== Consolation Bracket ==
Semi-Finals: March 18
4	Regina Cougars	68
8	UNB Varsity Reds	56
6	Alberta Pandas	69
7	Ottawa Gee-Gees	60

Fifth Place Game: March 19
4	Regina Cougars	73
6	Alberta Pandas	74
