= 2020 U Sports Women's Basketball Championship =

Canadian university basketball championship

2020 U Sports Women's Final 8
- Season: 2019-20
- Teams: Eight
- Finals site: TD Place Arena; Ottawa, Ontario
- Champions: Saskatchewan Huskies (2nd title)
- Runner-up: Brock Badgers
- Winning coach: Lisa Thomaidis
- Tournament MVP: Sabine Dukate (Saskatchewan Huskies)
- Television: CBC Sports

The 2020 U Sports Women's Basketball Championship was held March 5–8, 2020, in Ottawa, Ontario, to determine a national champion for the 2019–20 U Sports women's basketball season. The Saskatchewan Huskies defeated the Brock Badgers to win the national championship, which was the second Bronze Baby trophy win in program history.

== Host ==
The tournament was jointly hosted by Carleton University, the University of Ottawa, and the Ottawa Sports & Entertainment Group (OSEG) at TD Place Arena. It was also held in conjunction with the 2020 U Sports Men's Basketball Championship which occurs on the same weekend. This was the first time that the city of Ottawa hosted the women's championship game.

== Participating teams ==
Seed	Team	Qualified	Record
1	Saskatchewan Huskies	Canada West Champion	18–2
2	Brock Badgers	OUA Champion	17–5
3	Ryerson Rams	OUA Finalist	18–4
4	Laval Rouge et Or	RSEQ Champion	12–4
5	Alberta Pandas	Canada West Finalist	16–4
6	UPEI Panthers	AUS Champion	17–3
7	Calgary Dinos	CW Semifinalist (At-large berth)	18–2
8	Carleton Ravens	OUA Quarterfinalist (Host)	15–7

== Championship Bracket ==
First Round: March 5
1	Saskatchewan Huskies	73
8	Carleton Ravens	59
4	Laval Rouge et Or	59
5	Alberta Pandas	52
3	Ryerson Rams	70
6	UPEI Panthers	75
2	Brock Badgers	72
7	Calgary Dinos	71

Semi-Finals: March 7
1	Saskatchewan Huskies	76
4	Laval Rouge et Or	57
2	Brock Badgers	69
6	UPEI Panthers	55

Final: March 8
1	Saskatchewan Huskies	82
2	Brock Badgers	61
Bronze Medal Game: March 8
4	Laval Rouge et Or	50
6	UPEI Panthers	57

== Consolation Bracket ==
Semi-Finals: March 6
5	Alberta Pandas	70
8	Carleton Ravens	72
3	Ryerson Rams	64
7	Calgary Dinos	87

Fifth Place Game: March 7
7	Calgary Dinos	66
8	Carleton Ravens	61

== Awards and honours ==
=== Top 100 ===
In celebration of the centennial anniversary of U Sports women's basketball, a committee of U Sports women's basketball coaches and partners revealed a list of the Top 100 women's basketball players. Commemorating the 100th anniversary of the first Canadian university women's contest between the Queen's Gaels and McGill Martlets on February 6, 1920, the list of the Top 100 was gradually revealed over four weeks. Culminating with the All-Canadian Gala, which also recognized national award winners.

- Nan Copp Award (recognizing U Sports Player of the Year): Jenna Mae Ellsworth, UPEI Panthers

=== Championship All-Star Team ===
- Championship MVP : Sabine Dukate, Saskatchewan
  - Sabine Dukate, Saskatchewan
  - Summer Masikewich, Saskatchewan
  - Melissa Tatti, Brock
  - Samantha Keltos, Brock
  - Jenna Mae Ellsworth, UPEI

=== Player of the Game Awards ===
- Nike Top Performers - March 7, 2020 - Semi-Final 1: Brock vs. UPEI - Brock: Samantha Keltos, UPEI: Jenna Mae Elsworth
- Nike Top Performers - March 7, 2020 - Semi-Final 2: Saskatchewan vs. Laval - Saskatchewan: Megan Ahlstrom, Laval: Carrie-Ann Auger
- Nike Top Performers - March 7, 2020 - Fifth place Game: Calgary vs. Carleton - Carleton: Jaclyn Ronson, Calgary: Liene Staldazine
- Nike Top Performers - March 8, 2020 - Bronze Medal Game: UPEI vs. Laval - UPEI: Reese Baxendale, Laval: Kim Letang
- Nike Top Performers - March 8, 2020 - Gold Medal Game: Saskatchewan vs. Brock - Saskatchewan: Sabine Dukate, Brock: Samantha Keltos
