= 2017 U Sports Women's Basketball Championship =

Canadian university basketball championship

- Season: 2016-17
- Teams: Eight
- Finals site: CARSA Performance Gym; Victoria, British Columbia
- Champions: McGill Martlets (1st title)
- Runner-up: Laval Rouge et Or

The 2017 U Sports Women's Basketball Championship was held March 9–12, 2017, in Victoria, British Columbia, to determine a national champion for the 2016–17 U Sports women's basketball season. It was hosted by University of Victoria at the CARSA Performance Gym, which was the first time since 1993 that Victoria had hosted the tournament.

== Participating teams ==
Seed	Team	Qualified
1	Carleton Ravens	OUA Champion
2	Saskatchewan Huskies	Canada West Champion
3	Queen's Gaels	OUA Finalist
4	McGill Martlets	RSEQ Champion
5	Regina Cougars	Canada West Finalist
6	Cape Breton Capers	AUS Champion
7	Laval Rouge et Or	RSEQ Semi-Finalist (At-large berth)
8	Victoria Vikes	Canada West Quarter-Finalist (Host)

== Championship Bracket ==
First Round: March 9
1	Carleton Ravens	77
8	Victoria Vikes	66
3	Queen's Gaels	60
6	Cape Breton Capers	51
4	McGill Martlets	72
5	Regina Cougars	62
2	Saskatchewan Huskies	59
7	Laval Rouge et Or	69

Semi-Finals: March 11
1	Carleton Ravens	60
4	McGill Martlets	66
3	Queen's Gaels	67
7	Laval Rouge et Or	78

Final: March 12
4	McGill Martlets	66
7	Laval Rouge et Or	55
Bronze Medal Game: March 12
1	Carleton Ravens	53
3	Queen's Gaels	43

== Consolation Bracket ==
Semi-Finals: March 10
2	Saskatchewan Huskies	65
6	Cape Breton Capers	51
5	Regina Cougars	78
8	Victoria Vikes	64

Fifth Place Game: March 11
2	Saskatchewan Huskies	76
5	Regina Cougars	79
