= Brock Badgers =

Brock University athletic teams

- University: Brock University
- Nickname: Badgers
- Association: U Sports
- Conference: Ontario University Athletics
- Athletic director: Melissa Krist
- Location: St. Catharines, Ontario
- Varsity teams: 36 (18 men's, 18 women's)
- Basketball arena: Bob Davis Gymnasium
- Ice hockey arena: Canada Games Park
- Baseball stadium: George Taylor Field
- Soccer stadium: Brock Alumni Field
- Aquatics center: Eleanor Misener Aquatic Centre
- Lacrosse stadium: Brock Alumni Field
- Golf course: St. Catharines Club
- Rowing venue: Leo LeBlanc Rowing Centre
- Volleyball arena: Bob Davis Gymnasium
- Colours: Red, Navy, and White
- Mascot: Boomer the Badger
- Website: gobadgers.ca
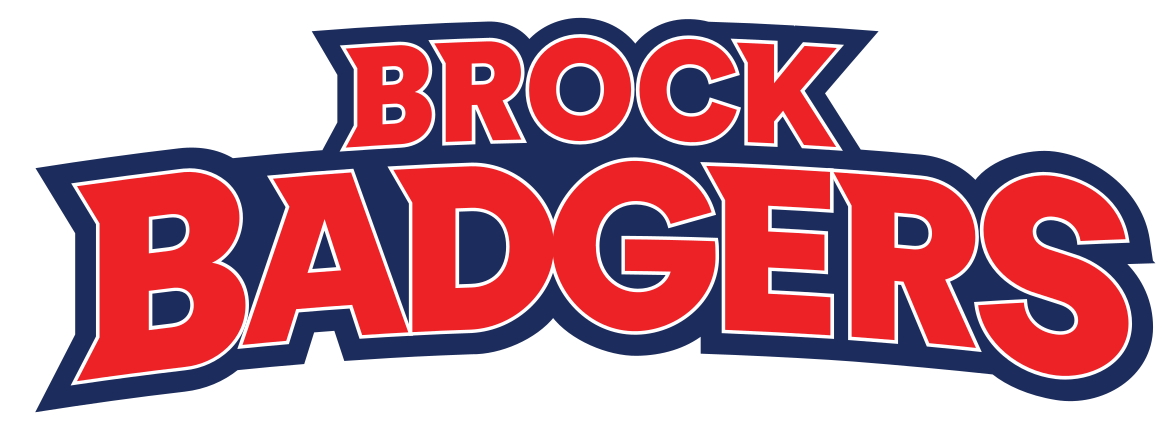

The Brock Badgers are the athletics teams that represent Brock University in St. Catharines, Ontario. To date, the Badgers have won 47 National Championships and 94 Ontario Championships, and are members of the OUA, U Sports, CUFLA, CURC, OIWFA and OUBHL.

While technically not considered a varsity team, Brock has a university ringette team which competes annually in the Canadian national University Challenge Cup.

== Varsity teams ==
Brock has the following varsity sports:

Men's sports	Women's sports
Baseball	Basketball
Basketball	Cross country
Cross country	Curling
Curling	Fencing
Fencing	Figure skating
Figure skating	Golf
Golf	Ice hockey
Ice hockey	Lacrosse
Lacrosse	Rowing
Rowing	Rugby
Rugby	Soccer
Soccer	Softball
Squash	Squash
Swimming	Swimming
Tennis	Tennis
Track and field	Track and field
Volleyball	Volleyball
Wrestling	Wrestling

== Club teams ==
- Ball hockey (men's)
- Cheerleading (women's)
- Equestrian (women's)
- eSports
- Fastpitch (women's)
- Powerlifting
- Ringette (Women's)
- Ultimate Frisbee (co-ed)

== Championships ==
As of the end of the 2022–23 season.

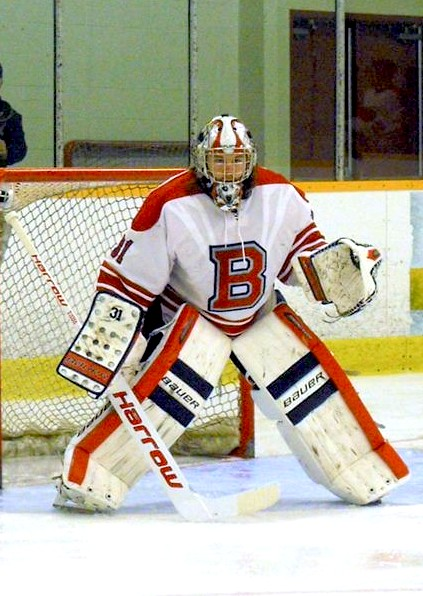
Brock Badgers goalie 2013–14 season.

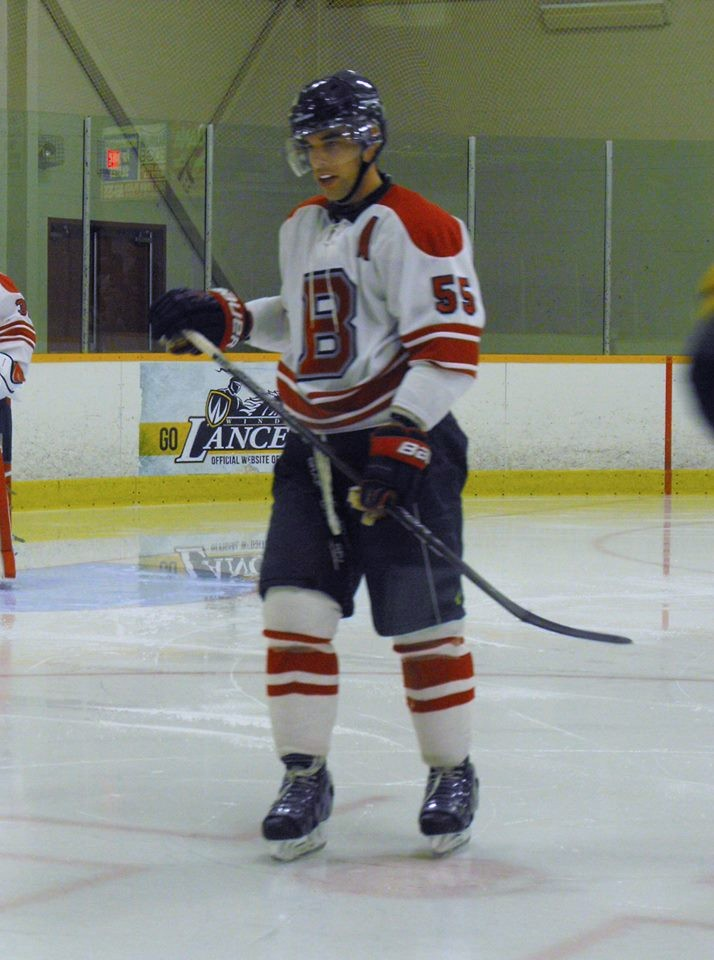
Brock Badgers skater 2013–14 season.

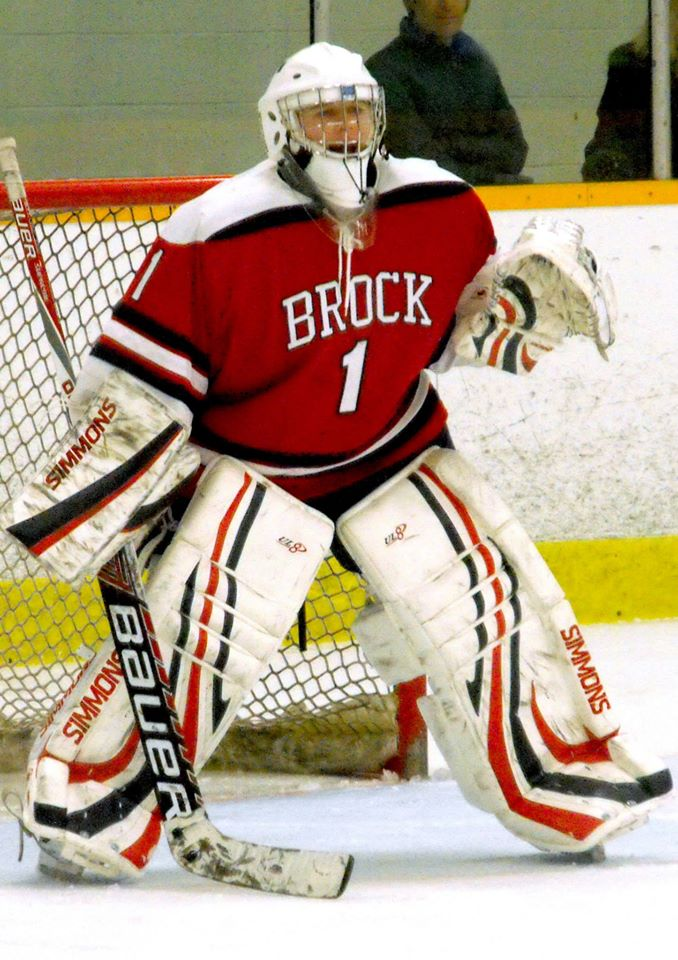
Brock Badgers women's goalie 2014–15 season.

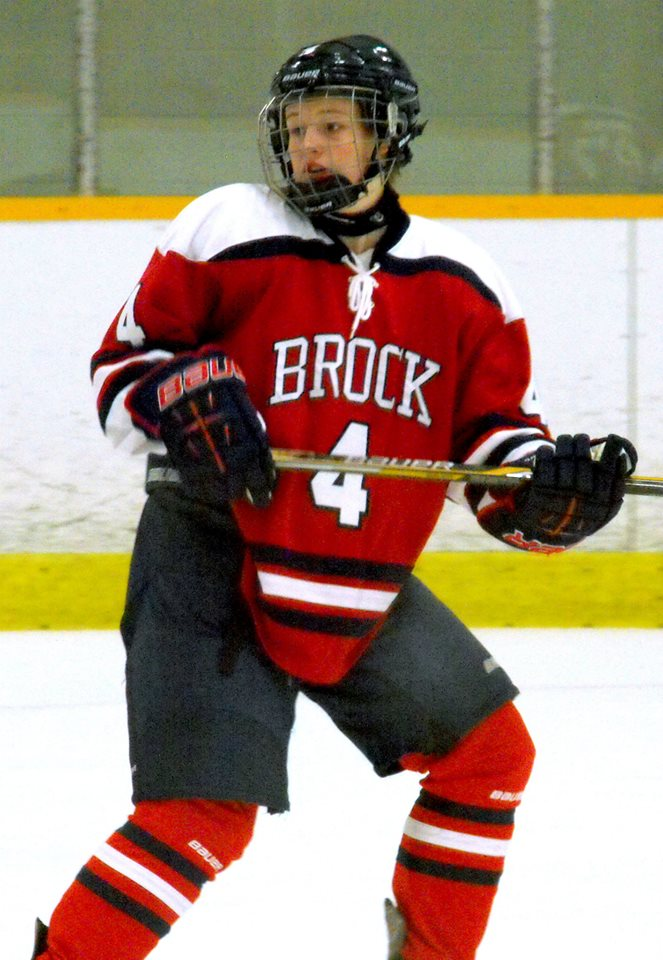
Brock Badgers women's player 2014–15 season.

=== Canadian Championships ===
Men's Wrestling (19)

- 1991–92, 1994–95, 1995–96, 1998–99, 1999–00, 2000–01, 2001–02, 2003–04, 2004–05, 2005–06, 2006–07, 2007–08, 2013–14, 2014–15, 2015–16, 2016–17, 2017–18, 2018–19, 2019–20

Women's Wrestling (9)

- 2001–02, 2011–12, 2012–13, 2013–14, 2014–15, 2015–16, 2016–17, 2017–18, 2019–20

Men's Lacrosse (5)

- 2004–05, 2005–06, 2006–07, 2007–08, 2009–10

Men's Rowing (5)

- 1999–00, 2002–03, 2003–04, 2004–05, 2012–13

Men's Baseball (2)

- 1998–99, 1999–00

Men's Basketball (2)

- 1991–92, 2007–08

Men's Soccer (1)

- 2002–03

=== Provincial Championships ===
Men's Wrestling (22)

- 1991–92, 1994–95, 1995–96, 1996–97, 1997–98, 1998–99, 1999–00, 2000–01, 2001–02, 2002–03, 2003–04, 2004–05, 2005–06, 2006–07, 2007–08, 2008–09, 2009–10, 2015–16, 2016–17, 2017–18, 2019–20, 2021–22

Women's Wrestling (20)

- 1998–99, 1999–00, 2000–01, 2001–02, 2002–03, 2003–04, 2004–05, 2005–06, 2007–08, 2008–09, 2009–10, 2010–11, 2011–12, 2012–13, 2014–15, 2015–16, 2016–17, 2017–18, 2019–20, 2021–22

Men's Rowing (9)

- 1998–99, 2001–02, 2002–03, 2003–04, 2004–05, 2010–11, 2012–13, 2014–15, 2017–18

Women's Curling (5)

- 1990–91, 1996–97, 1997–98, 2003–04, 2005–06

Men's Baseball (4)

- 2002–03, 2004–05, 2010–11, 2014–15

Men's Basketball (3)

- 1991–92, 1994–95, 2021–22

Men's Lacrosse (3)

- 1998–99, 2002–03, 2003–04

Men's Curling (2)

- 2006–07, 2017–18

Men's Ball Hockey (2)

- 2015–16, 2016–17

Women's Volleyball (2)

- 2021–22, 2022–23

Women's Basketball (2)

- 1982–83, 2019–20

Men's Rugby (1)

- 2007–08

Women's Fencing (1)

- 1984–85

Women's Ice Hockey (1)

- 2021–22

Rowing (2)

- 1967–68, 1972–73

Curling (1)

- 1971–72

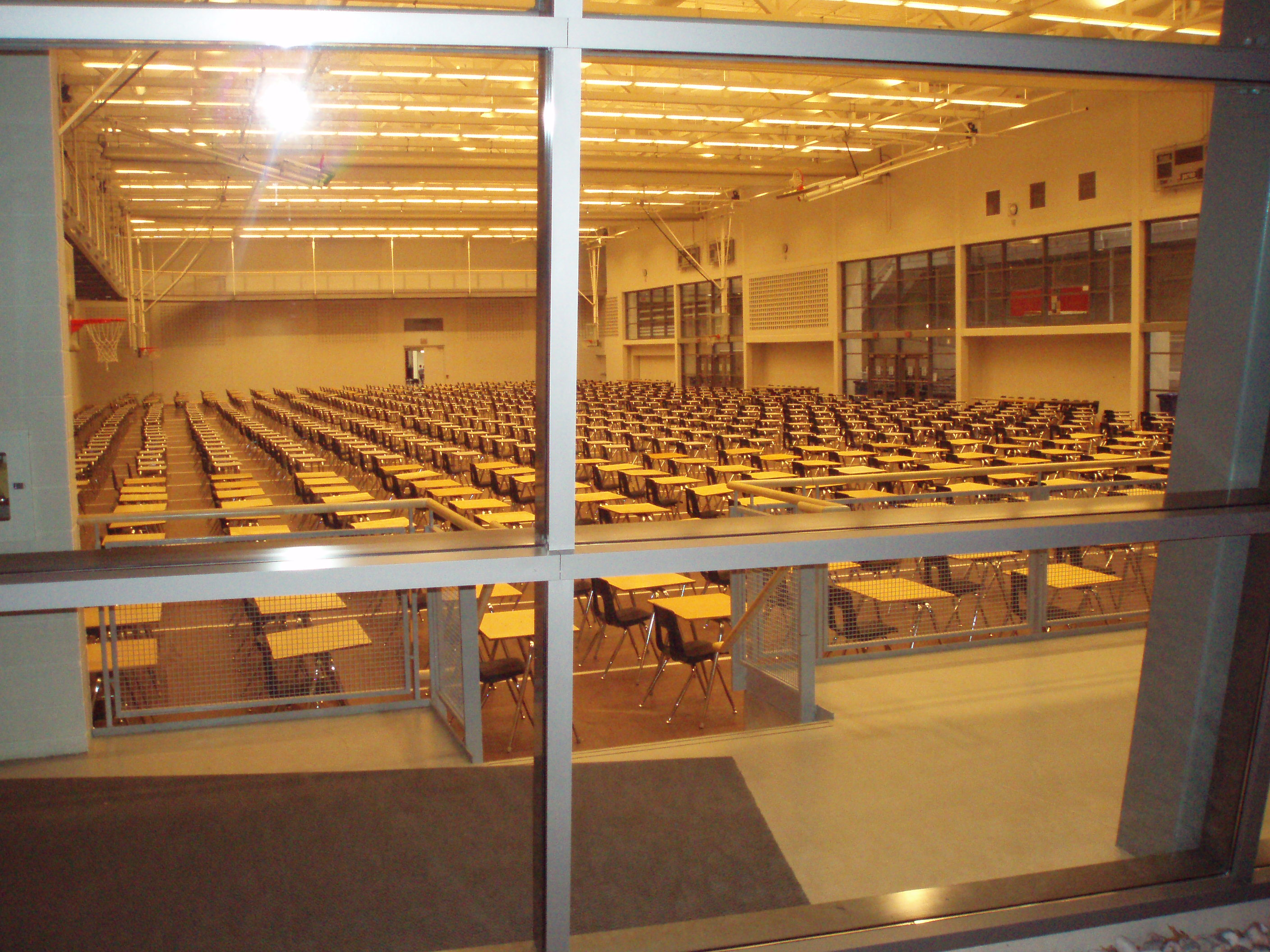
Gym during exam period, Brock University

== Hosting ==
- Brock men's hockey hosts the Steel Blade Classic.
- Brock men's basketball hosts Paint the Meridian Red
- Brock men's and women's basketball used to host the Peninsula Hoops Classic each year versus Niagara College. All proceeds went to the United Way of Canada.

== Notable former Brock Badgers ==
- Michelle Fazzari (Women's Wrestling) Team Canada
- Jasmine Mian (Women's Wrestling) Team Canada
- Eric Woefl (Men's Rowing) Team Canada
- Tim Schrijver (Men's Rowing) Team Canada
- Ray Barkwill (Men's Rugby) Team Canada
- Marty Calder (Wrestling) 2-Time Olympian, Olympic Coach
- Iain Brambell (Rowing) Olympic Medallist
- Ryan Del Monte (Men's Hockey) Pro Hockey Player ECHL & Germany
- Jessica MacDonald (Wrestling) 3-Time World Medallist
- Sean Pierson (Wrestling / Baseball) UFC Fighter
- Andrew Tinnish (Baseball) Toronto Blue Jays Assistant GM
- Tonya Verbeek (Wrestling) 3-Time Olympic Medallist
- Elisabeth Walker-Young (Swimming) Multiple Paralympic Gold Medallist
- Shawn Williams (Men's Lacrosse) NLL star (first lacrosse player inducted into Brock Hall of Fame)
- Logan Thompson(Men's Hockey) Washington Capitals Goalie

== Retired Jerseys ==
Men's Basketball

- #50 Ken Murray
- #9 Kevin Doran
- #31 David Picton
- #44 Kevin Stienstra
- #4 Brad Rootes

Men's Hockey

- #6 Dave Burt
- #24 Vince Scott

Women's Hockey

- #9 Jessica Fickel

== All-Time Leading Scorers ==
- David Picton (Men's Basketball)
- Jodie Ebeling (Women's Basketball)
- Darren Macoretta (Men's Hockey)
- Jessica Fickel (Women's Hockey)
- Ally Fast (All-Time Assists) (Women's Volleyball)
- Shawn Williams (Men's Lacrosse)

== Awards and honours ==
=== Athletes of the Year ===
This is an incomplete list

Year	Female Athlete	Sport	Male Athlete	Sport	Ref.
2010–11	Beth Clause	Hockey	Ben Cushnie	Rowing	
2011–12	Jade Parsons	Wrestling	Mike Lewis	Rowing	
2012–13	Diana Ford	Wrestling	CJ Hudson	Wrestling	
2013–14	Jessica Fickel	Hockey	Matt Abercrombie	Hockey	
2014–15	Carlene Sluberki	Wrestling	Nick Rowe	Wrestling	
2015–16	Olivia di Bacco	Wrestling	David de Groot	Rowing	
2016–17	Katie Desveaux	Figure Skating	Eric Bradey	Soccer and Curling	
2017–18	Jessica Brouilette	Wrestling	Clint Windsor	Hockey	
2018–19	Emily Schaefer	Wrestling	Jevon Balfour	Wrestling	
2019–20	Hannah Taylor	Wrestling	Clayton Pye	Wrestling	
2020–21	Not awarded due to the COVID-19 pandemic.				
2021–22	Cassidy Maplethorpe	Hockey	Stephen Harris	Rowing	
2022–23	Mia Friesen	Wrestling	Stephen Harris	Rowing	
2023–24	Sara Rohr	Volleyball	Connor Ungar	Hockey	

== Sources ==
- Brock Athletics Mission Statement
- Brock Athletics Athletes of the Year
- Brock Athletics Hall of Fame
- Lapinski, Stan (2006), Brock University athletics: 40 exciting seasons of Generals and Badgers, Brock University, ISBN 0-9682851-4-7
