= 2021 U Sports Women's Basketball Championship =

Canadian university basketball championship

The 2021 U Sports Women's Basketball Championship was scheduled to be held March 11–14, 2021, in Kingston, Ontario, to determine a national champion for the 2020–21 U Sports women's basketball season. However, on October 15, 2020, it was announced that the championship was cancelled due to the COVID-19 pandemic.

== Host ==
The tournament was scheduled to be hosted by Queen's University at their Athletic and Recreation Centre (ARC), which would have been the first time that Queen's would have hosted the championship game.
