= 2015 CIS Women's Basketball Championship =

Canadian university basketball championship

The 2015 CIS Women's Final 8 Basketball Tournament was held March 12–15, 2015, in Quebec City, Quebec. It was hosted by Université Laval at the PEPS Gymnasium, marking the fourth time Laval has hosted, and the fourth time the tournament has been played in Quebec City.

== Participating teams ==
Seed	Team	Qualified
1	Windsor Lancers	Ontario University Champion
2	UBC Thunderbirds	Canada West Champion
3	McGill Martlets	Quebec University Champion
4	Saskatchewan Huskies	Canada West Finalist
5	Alberta Pandas	Canada West Bronze Medalist
6	Saint Mary's Huskies	Atlantic University Champion
7	Ryerson Rams	Ontario University Finalist
8	Laval Rouge et Or	Host (Quebec University Semi-Finalist)

== Championship Bracket ==
First Round: March 12
1	Windsor Lancers	91
8	Laval Rouge et Or	57
4	Saskatchewan Huskies	70
5	Alberta Pandas	63
2	UBC Thunderbirds	81
7	Ryerson Rams	59
3	McGill Martlets	67
6	Saint Mary's Huskies	59

Semi-Finals: March 14
1	Windsor Lancers	75
4	Saskatchewan Huskies	61
2	UBC Thunderbirds	57
3	McGill Martlets	59 (OT)

Final: March 15
1	Windsor Lancers	60
3	McGill Martlets	47
Bronze Medal Game: March 15
2	UBC Thunderbirds	73
4	Saskatchewan Huskies	61

== Consolation Bracket ==
Semi-Finals: March 13
5	Alberta Pandas	62
8	Laval Rouge et Or	50
6	Saint Mary's Huskies	60
7	Ryerson Rams	76

Fifth Place Game: March 14
5	Alberta Pandas	73
7	Ryerson Rams	65

== See also ==
2015 CIS Men's Basketball Championship
