= Calgary Dinos women's basketball =

Canadian college basketball team

Calgary Dinos
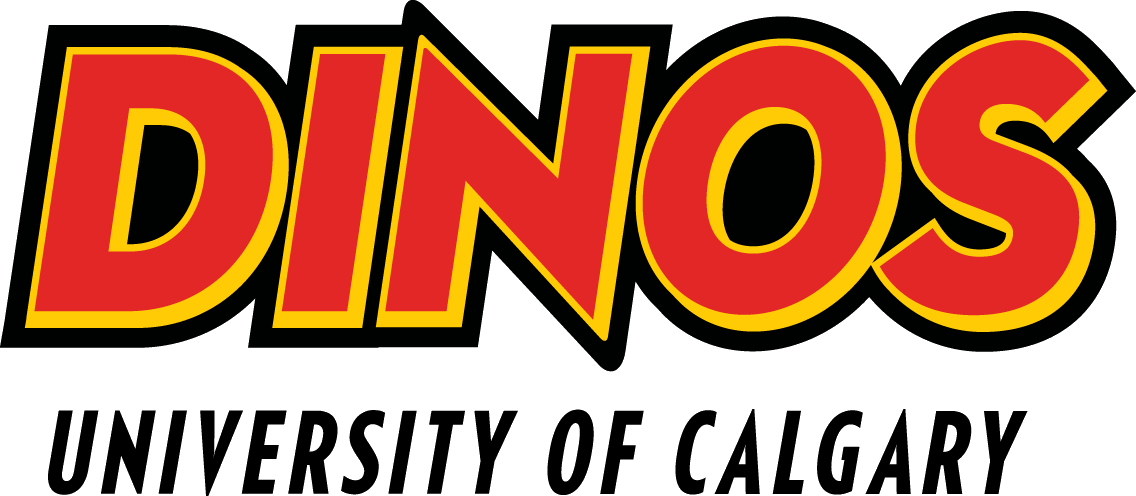
- University: University of Calgary
- Head coach: Jhonny Verone (interim) (1st season season)
- Location: Calgary, Alberta
- Arena: Jack Simpson Gymnasium (capacity: 3454)
- Conference: Canada West Universities Athletic Association
- Nickname: Dinos
- Colors: Red and gold

Conference tournament champions
- 1988, 1989, 1990, 1991

Conference regular-season champions
- 2013, 2019, 2020

Uniforms
Home	Away

The Calgary Dinos women's basketball team represent the University of Calgary in the Canada West Universities Athletic Association of U Sports women's basketball. In 1989, the Dinos captured the Bronze Baby, awarded to the U Sports National Champions.

== History ==
Starting on October 28, 1988, the Dinos enjoyed a superlative 69-game winning streak. Coming to an end on March 10, 1990, the stretch was highlighted by an undefeated 1988–89 season, which saw the program capture the Bronze Baby trophy. During the 1990–91 season, Jodi Evans led Canada West in points, assists, and rebounds, earning the Nan Copp Award for her efforts.

On February 11, 2012, which was also Senior Night for the Dinos, fifth-year player Jenna Kaye became the first player in program history to achieve a triple-double. Versus the Winnipeg Wesmen, Kaye recorded 10 points, 14 rebounds and 13 assists in an 88–62 victory.

The Dinos ended the 51-game winning streak of the Saskatchewan Huskies on February 21, 2026, as they won 61–58 in the Canada West semifinal and secured a spot in the national playoffs.

=== All-Time Coaches ===
- Pat Dewar
- Dr. Jean Leiper
- Theresa Maxwell (1972–75)
- Marilyn McNeil (1975–79)
- Donna Rudakas (1979–90, 1991–94)
- Jane Anne Smith (1990–91)
- Shawnee Harle (1994–2012)
- Damian Jennings (2012–2024)
- Jhonny Verone (interim coach, 2024–2025)
- Sarah Besselink (2025-present)

=== Individual Leader Scoring ===
Legend
GP	Games played	GS	Games started	MIN	Minutes played
FG	Field-goals	3FG	3-point field-goals	FT	Free-throws
PTS	Points	AVG	Points per game

Season	Player	GP	Min	FG	3FG	FT	Pts	Avg	Canada West Rank
2019-20	Liene Stalidzane	20	579	111	46	28	296	14.8	13th
2018-19	Erin McIntosh	20	558	111	33	53	308	15.4	14th
2017-18	Brianna Ghali	20	473	110	29	48	297	14.9	17th

=== Season by season record ===
Season	Conf. Record	Overall	Conf. Rank	Finish
2019-20	18-2	x-x	1st	Tournament
2018-19	17-3	27-7	1st	
2017-18
2016-17

== All-time records ==
=== Scoring ===
Points	Player	Years
1958	Leighann Doan	1996-01
1644	Meagan Koch	1991-96
1643	Ashley Hill	2006-11
1458	Janis Paskevich	1977-82
1351	Tanya Hautala	2001-06
1335	Veronica Vanderschee	1985-90
1278	Lindsay Maundrell	2002-07
1257	Tamara Jarrett	2009-14
1206	Lisa Bacigalupi	1990-95
982	Erin McIntosh	2015-20

== U Sports Elite 8 results ==
Year	Seed	Round	Opponent	Result
2020	#7	First Round; Consolation Bracket (Semi-Finals); Consolation Bracket (Finals)	# 2 Brock Badgers #3 Ryerson Rams #8 Carleton Ravens	L 72–71; W 87–64; W 66–61

== Awards and honors ==
- 2001 Lieutenant Governor Athletic Awards: Leighann Doan

=== Canada West Hall of Fame ===
- Class of 2021 Inductee: Jodi Evans
- Class of 2020 Inductee: Leighann Reimer
- Class of 2019 Inductee: Theresa Maxwell

=== U Sports Awards ===
- 2004-05 Tracy MacLeod Award (Perseverance): Cory Bekkering
- 2001-02 Tracy MacLeod Award (Perseverance): Debra Hidson
- 1996-97 Kathy Shields Award (Rookie of the year): Leighann Doan

=== Nan Copp Award ===
Awarded to the U Sports Player of the year

- 2000-01 Leighann Doan, Calgary
- 1999-00 Leighann Doan, Calgary
- 1990-91 Jodi Evans, Calgary
- 1989-90 Veronica VanderSchee, Calgary
- 1987-88 Veronica VanderSchee, Calgary
- 1980-81 Janis Paskevich, Calgary

=== Peter Ennis Award ===
Awarded to the Coach of the Year

- 1989-90 Donna Rudakas
- 1988-89 Donna Rudakas
- 1978-79 Marilyn McNeil

=== U Sports Nationals ===
- 1988-89 U Sports championship MVP: Veronica VanderSchee

==== Player of the Game ====
- 2020 U Sports Consolation Final - Liene Staldazine: Calgary

=== Top 100 ===
In celebration of the centennial anniversary of U SPORTS women's basketball, a committee of U SPORTS women's basketball coaches and partners revealed a list of the Top 100 women's basketball players. Commemorating the 100th anniversary of the first Canadian university women's contest between the Queen's Gaels and McGill Martlets on Feb. 6, 1920, the list of the Top 100 was gradually revealed over four weeks. The list would feature 7 Dinos alumnae.

Player	Team(s)	Years	Accolades
Darlene Currie	Calgary	1956-58	
Janis Paskevich-MacDonald	Calgary	1977-82	
Karla Karch	Calgary; Victoria	1982-88	
Veronica VanderSchee	Calgary	1985-90	
Kelly Boucher	Calgary; Victoria	1985-91	Played for Canada in Basketball at the 1996 Summer Olympics; Also played for Canada in Basketball at the 2000 Summer Olympics; Competed for the Charlotte Sting of the Women's National Basketball Association (WNBA).
Jodi Evans	Calgary	1986-91	Attended Oxford University as a Rhodes Scholar in 1991; Made history as the first woman to represent the Oxford University men's basketball team in The Varsity Game against Cambridge. Played for Canada in Basketball at the 1996 Summer Olympics
Leighann Doan	Calgary	1996-01	Won the 2001 Lieutenant Governor Athletic Awards

== International ==
- Kelly Boucher Canada Basketball at the 1996 Summer Olympics, Basketball at the 2000 Summer Olympics
- Jodi Evans Canada Basketball at the 1996 Summer Olympics
- Erin McIntosh: Canada 2019 Winter Universiade
