= Carleton Ravens women's basketball =

Women's college basketball team

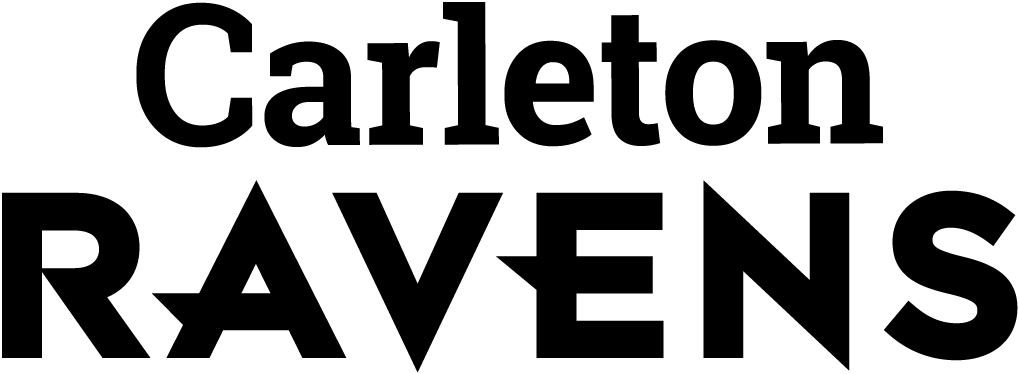
- University: Carleton University
- Head coach: Dani Sinclair (Since 2021-22 season)
- Location: Ottawa, Ontario
- Arena: Ravens’ Nest
- Conference: OUA
- Nickname: Ravens
- Colors: Black, white, and red

U Sports tournament champions
- 2018, 2023, 2024

Conference tournament champions
- 2017, 2018, 2023

Conference regular-season champions
- 2018

Uniforms
| Home | Away |

The Carleton Ravens women's basketball team represent Carleton University in the Ontario University Athletics of U Sports women's basketball. The Ravens have won three national championships, in 2018, 2023 and 2024. The Ravens have also won the OUA Critelli Cup conference championship three times, in 2017, 2018, and 2023. Between 2009 and 2018, the Ruth Coe Award, recognizing Carleton University’s Female Athlete of the Year, was won by seven female basketball players. Additionally, the program served as host team for the 2020 U Sports Women's Basketball Championship, contested at Ottawa's TD Place Arena.

In 2023, both the women’s and men’s teams won the national titles, something no school had accomplished since 1985, when the Victoria Vikes were double champions.

== History ==
From 2007 to 2019, the Ravens were coached by Taffe Charles. An assistant coach with the women’s program in 1995, he would join Dave Smart’s coaching staff with the Ravens men’s team in 1998, enjoying five U SPORTS national championships, before returning to the women’s program in 2007.

Under Charles’ leadership, the women’s team captured the 2010 OUA East Division title, qualifying for the OUA East postseason finals. It would mark the first of five division titles. The Ravens would top the East Division in 2013, 2014 and 2018, while the 2016-17 season saw a first place finish in the OUA North Division. Clinching its first appearance in the U Sports Final 8 in 2011, the program would return to the biggest stage in Canadian university basketball in 2013, 2017 and 2018.

The 2012-13 season saw the Ravens among the top five in the national basketball rankings, defeating the Ottawa Gee-Gees to win the East Division Final. Finishing the 2016-17 season with an 18-1 mark, its highest win total in the 45-year history of the program (since broken), the Ravens would enjoy the milestone of a number-1 ranking in the national polls, reaching the summit on November 15, 2016. Reaching the U Sports Final 8, the Ravens defeated the Victoria Vikes in the quarterfinals, enjoying their first-ever win at the tournament.

Winning the OUA conference title in 2017 and 2018, the Ravens enjoyed a perfect 29-0 record, for their first-ever undefeated season, capturing the Bronze Baby for the first time in 2018. Defensively, the Ravens stymied their competition during the championship season, averaging merely 45.9 points per game, resulting in the finest defense in U Sports.

Elizabeth Leblanc was a key player during the 2017-18 season, culminating in a perfect 29-0 season, highlighted by the program's first national championship. Statistically, Leblanc averaged 26.7 minutes per game, signifying her third straight season of leading the team. With 10.8 points, 4.8 rebounds, 2.7 assists and 1.1 blocks per game, Leblanc also won the U Sports Defensive Player of the Year Award, the first player in Ravens history to do so.

The season also saw Heather Lindsay garner some hardware, capturing the Carleton Ravens Athletics Outstanding Graduating Female Athlete award. In what proved to be her last campaign as a Raven, Lindsay reached the plateau of 100 regular season appearances, complemented by 82 starts. With career averages of 11.1 points, 9.3 rebounds and 1.4 blocks per game, she graduated by surpassing the 1000-point career mark.

During the 2018-19 season, Nicole Gilmore reached career-highs in many categories. Starting with 14.3 points-per-game, 7.7 rebounds per game, plus shooting 40.5 per cent from the field, she received the Carleton Ravens Outstanding Graduating Female Athlete Award.

The Ravens finished fifth at the 2026 national championship following a 60-58 win over Toronto Metropolitan Bold on March 7, 2026.

=== Season-by-season record ===
| National champions | Lost championship | Conference champions | League leader |

| Season | W | L | PF | PA | Finish |
|---|---|---|---|---|---|
| 2003–04 | 7 | 15 | 1198 | 1273 | 7th, OUA East |
| 2004–05 | 5 | 17 | 1120 | 1281 | 7th, OUA East |
| 2005–06 | 10 | 12 | 1268 | 1267 | 5th, OUA East |
| 2006–07 | 5 | 17 | 1272 | 1477 | 6th, OUA East |
| 2007–08 | 8 | 14 | 1280 | 1307 | 5th, OUA East |
| 2008–09 | 14 | 8 | 1388 | 1184 | 3rd, OUA East |
| 2009–10 | 18 | 4 | 1473 | 1119 | 1st, OUA East |
| 2010–11 | 18 | 4 | 1430 | 1209 | 1st, OUA East |
| 2011–12 | 17 | 5 | 1494 | 1157 | 2nd, OUA East |
| 2012-13 | 15 | 5 | 1337 | 1048 | 2nd, OUA East |
| 2013-14 | 16 | 6 | 1290 | 1172 | 1st, OUA East |
| 2014-15 | 9 | 10 | 1113 | 1047 | 2nd, OUA North |
| 2015-16 | 14 | 5 | 1289 | 1061 | 2nd, OUA North |
| 2016-17 | 18 | 1 | 1296 | 970 | 1st, OUA North |
| 2017-18 | 23 | 0 | 1666 | 1055 | 1st, OUA East |
| 2018-19 | 18 | 5 | 1532 | 1242 | 2nd, OUA East |
| 2019-20 | 15 | 7 | 1498 | 1273 | 2nd, OUA East |
| 2020-21 | Cancelled due to the COVID-19 pandemic | | | | |
| 2021-22 | 11 | 5 | 1129 | 901 | 2nd, OUA East |
| 2022-23 | 19 | 3 | 1646 | 1264 | 2nd, OUA East |
| 2023-24 | 21 | 1 | 1774 | 1178 | 1st, OUA East |
| 2024-25 | 22 | 0 | 1659 | 1181 | 2nd, OUA East |

=== Capital Hoops Classic ===
| Ottawa victories | Carleton victories |

| Year | Site | Winning team | | Losing team | | Series | Attendance | Notes |
|---|---|---|---|---|---|---|---|---|
| 2008 | Scotiabank Place | Carleton | 53 | Ottawa | 43 | CAR 1–0 | 9,124 | Inaugural edition of Women's game |
| 2009 | Scotiabank Place | Carleton | 62 | Ottawa | 53 | CAR 2–0 | 10,523 | |
| 2010 | Scotiabank Place | Carleton | 53 | Ottawa | 40 | CAR 3–0 | 8,074 | |
| 2011 | Scotiabank Place | Carleton | 71 | Ottawa | 63 | CAR 4–0 | 7,565 | |
| 2012 | Scotiabank Place | Ottawa | 59 | Carleton | 55 | CAR 4–1 | 7,022 | |
| 2013 | Scotiabank Place | Carleton | 68 | Ottawa | 50 | CAR 5–1 | 6,208 | |
| 2014 | Canadian Tire Centre | Ottawa | 57 | Carleton | 47 | CAR 5–2 | 6,604 | |
| 2015 | Canadian Tire Centre | Ottawa | 46 | Carleton | 40 | CAR 5–3 | 10,780 | Highest attendance record |
| 2016 | Canadian Tire Centre | Carleton | 73 | Ottawa | 50 | CAR 6–3 | 10,105 | Largest margin of victory |
| 2017 | Canadian Tire Centre | Carleton | 57 | Ottawa | 44 | CAR 7–3 | 10,030 | |
| 2018 | Canadian Tire Centre | Carleton | 57 | Ottawa | 41 | CAR 8–3 | 8,579 | |
| 2019 | Canadian Tire Centre | Ottawa | 61 | Carleton | 52 | CAR 8–4 | 9,004 | |
| 2020 | TD Place | Ottawa | 77 | Carleton | 75 | CAR 8-5 | 8,103 | |
| 2022 | Ravens Nest | Carleton | 63 | Ottawa | 43 | CAR 9-5 | | |
| 2023 | TD Place | Carleton | 66 | Ottawa | 60 | CAR 10-5 | | |
| 2024 | TD Place | Carleton | 78 | Ottawa | 72 | CAR 11-5 | 6,137 | |

=== Individual leader scoring ===
Legend
| GP | Games played | GS | Games started | MIN | Minutes played |
| FG | Field-goals | 3FG | 3-point field-goals | FT | Free-throws |
| PTS | Points | AVG | Points per game |

| Season | Player | GP | Min | FG | 3FG | FT | Pts | Avg | OUA rank |
|---|---|---|---|---|---|---|---|---|---|
| 2015-16 | Heather Lindsay | 19 | 473 | 126 | 0 | 50 | 302 | 15.9 | 5th |
| 2014-15 | Lindsay Shotbolt | 14 | 389 | 61 | 11 | 30 | 163 | 11.6 | 20th |
| 2013-14 | Alyson Bush | 22 | 727 | 107 | 9 | 100 | 323 | 15.0 | 9th |
| 2012-13 | Alyson Bush | 20 | 592 | 105 | 44 | 31 | 285 | 14.3 | 10th |
| 2011-12 | Alyson Bush | 22 | 620 | 111 | 27 | 52 | 301 | 13.7 | 11th |
| 2010-11 | Kendall MacLeod | 22 | 516 | 79 | 19 | 68 | 245 | 11.1 | 22nd |
| 2009-10 | Alyson Bush | 22 | 634 | 73 | 28 | 44 | 218 | 9.91 | |

== International ==
- Catherine Traer Canada: 2017 Summer Universiade
- Nicole Gilmore Canada 2019 Summer Universiade

== Awards and honours ==
- 2016-17 U Sports Rebounding Champion: Heather Lindsay (10.8 rebounds per game)

=== All-Canadians ===
- 2018-19 Second Team All-Canadian: Nicole Gilmore

=== OUA Awards ===
- 2009-10 OUA East Coach of the Year: Taffe Charles
- 2013-14 OUA All-Rookie Team: Heather Lindsay
- 2017-18 OUA Coach of the Year and the :Taffe Charles
- 2018-19 OUA Defensive Player of the Year: Nicole Gilmore

==== OUA All-Stars ====
First team

- 2018-19 OUA First-Team All-Star: Nicole Gilmore
- 2016-17 OUA First-Team: Heather Lindsay
- 2016-17 OUA First-Team: Catherine Traer

Second team

- 2017-18: OUA Second Team All-Star - Heather Lindsay
- 2016-17 Second Team: Elizabeth Leblanc
- 2015-16: OUA Second Team All-Star - Heather Lindsay

==== OUA Showcase ====
- 2019 Showcase Participant: Alyssa Cerino, Carleton (named to Team Burns)
- 2019 Showcase Participant: Nicole Gilmore, Carleton (named to Team Belanger)
- 2018 OUA Showcase Participant: Alexandra Trivieri (named to Team Charles)

=== U Sports Awards ===
- 2016-17: U SPORTS Second-Team All-Canadian - Heather Lindsay
- 2017-18: Elizabeth Leblanc U SPORTS Defensive Player of the Year award
- 2017-18 Peter Ennis Award as U SPORTS national coach of the year: Taffe Charles
- 2024-25 Peter Ennis Award as U SPORTS national coach of the year: Dani Sinclair

==== U Sports nationals ====
- 2018 U SPORTS Final 8 Championship MVP: Elizabeth Leblanc
- 2018 U SPORTS Final 8 Championship All-Tournament Team: Elizabeth Leblanc

==== U Sports All-Canadians ====
- 2019 Second Team All-Canadian: Nicole Gilmore

=== University honours ===
- 2016-17 Pat O’Brien Award – Carleton Ravens Athletics Coach of the Year: Taffe Charles
- 2017-18 Pat O’Brien Award – Carleton Ravens Athletics Coach of the Year: Taffe Charles

Ruth Coe Award

- 2010-11: Alyson Bush
- 2016-17: Heather Lindsay - Ruth Coe Award winner as Carleton Ravens Athletics Female Athlete of the Year
- 2017-18: Elizabeth Leblanc - Ruth Coe Award winner as Carleton Ravens Athletics Female Athlete of the Year

Outstanding Graduating Women’s Athlete of the Year

- 2011-12: Ashleigh Cleary - Carleton Ravens athletics Outstanding Graduating Women’s Athlete of the Year
- 2017-18: Heather Lindsay - Carleton Ravens athletics Outstanding Graduating Women’s Athlete of the Year
- 2018-19: Nicole Gilmore - Carleton Ravens athletics Outstanding Graduating Women’s Athlete of the Year

=== Team awards ===
This is an incomplete list

==== Most Valuable Player ====
- 1996-97: Karin Brown
- 1997-98: Rosie Warden
- 1998-99: Rosie Warden
- 1999-00: Tamara McNulty
- 2000-01: Rosie Warden
- 2001-02: Anne McDonnell
- 2002-03: Dasa Farthing
- 2003-04: Ashley Kimmett
- 2004-05: Sarah Kennedy
- 2005-06: Dasa Farthing
- 2006-07: Susan Shaw-Davis
- 2007-08: Tanya Perry
- 2008-09: Ines Jelic
- 2010-11: Ashleigh Clearly
- 2011-12: Kendall MacLeod
- 2012-13: Alyson Bush
- 2013-14: Alyson Bush
- 2014-15: Lindsay Shotbolt
- 2015-16: Heather Lindsay
- 2016-17: Heather Lindsay
- 2019-20: Alyssa Cerino

==== Alumni Award ====
- 2014-15: Abeer Farhat
- 2015-16: Abeer Farhat
