= Saskatchewan Huskies women's basketball =

Women's university basketball team

- University: University of Saskatchewan
- Head coach: Lisa Thomaidis (Since 1998–99 season)
- Location: Saskatoon, Saskatchewan
- Arena: Physical Activity Complex (PAC) (capacity: 2426)
- Conference: Canada West
- Nickname: Huskies
- Colors: Green and white

U Sports tournament champions
- 2016, 2020, 2025, 2026

U Sports tournament appearances
- 2006, 2008, 2009, 2010, 2011, 2012, 2014, 2015, 2016, 2017, 2018, 2019, 2020, 2022, 2024, 2025, 2026

Conference tournament champions
- 2006, 2011, 2014, 2016, 2017, 2019, 2020, 2022, 2024, 2025

Conference regular-season champions
- 2005, 2011, 2016, 2024, 2025, 2026

Uniforms
Home	Away

The Saskatchewan Huskies women's basketball team represents the University of Saskatchewan in the Canada West Universities Athletic Association of U Sports women's basketball. The Huskies have captured four national championships, winning the first in 2016, followed by victories in 2020, then 2025 and finally in 2026. Led by head coach Lisa Thomaidis, who first led the program for the 1998-99 season, she has also served as head coach of the Canada women's national basketball team. Holding the program record for regular season wins (281), Canada West playoff wins (49) and U Sports National Tournament wins (19), the Huskies have also won eight Canada West titles under her tutelage. Home games are contested at the Physical Activity Complex (PAC), which was constructed in 2003.

== History ==
In the 2019-20 season, the Huskies finished in first place in Canada West with a record of 18-2. Scoring 1920 points, averaging 96.0 points per game, the Huskies led all teams in Canada West play. Additionally, their 1260 points allowed (63.0 points per game), resulted in a differential of 33 points, which was tops in Canada West.

The Huskies won their third national title on March 16, 2025, as they won a 85-66 victory over the Carleton Ravens in the 2025 championship final.

On February 7, 2026, following a 84-54 win over the Winnipeg Wesmen, the Huskies completed a perfect regular season, their second in program history (the other being the 1971-72 season), having won every game of the 2025-26 regular season and extending their overall winning streak to a total of 50 games. Across the 2025-26 regular season, the Huskies held a 31.5 point average margin of victory. The Huskies' 51-game winning streak was ended on February 21, 2026, as they lost 61-58 to the Calgary Dinos in the Canada West semifinal. The Huskies were awarded the wildcard berth that season, qualifying them for the 2026 national championship as the number 5 seed. The Huskies won the Bronze Baby for the second consecutive time following a 77-68 win over the UNB Reds in the final on March 8, 2026, with Ella Murphy Wiebe being named as the tournament's MVP.

The Huskies won silver at the 2025 FISU America 3x3 Basketball Championship in Tegulcigapa, Honduras, qualifying for the 2026 University World Cup following a 21-15 loss to the Carleton Ravens in May 2026.

=== Recent season-by-season record ===
National Championships	Conference Championships	Regular Season Champions	League leader

Season	Coach	W–L	PS	PA	Standing	Canada West playoffs	National playoffs
2015–16	Lisa Thomiadis	18–2	1590	1146	1st, Pioneer	Canada West Champions	2016 National Champions
2016–17	Lisa Thomiadis	15–5	1405	1186	5th	Canada West Champions	Lost 5th-place game
2017–18	Lisa Thomiadis	17–3	1643	1172	2nd	Lost Canada West Finals	Lost championship finals
2018–19	Lisa Thomiadis	16–4	1627	1114	3rd	Canada West Champions	Lost bronze medal game
2019–20	Lisa Thomiadis	18–2	1920	1260	2nd	Canada West Champions	2020 National Champions
2020–21	Cancelled due to the COVID-19 pandemic						
2021–22	Lisa Thomiadis	14–2	1246	868	1st, CW East	Canada West Champions	Won 5th-place game
2022–23	Lisa Thomiadis	17–3	—	—	2nd	Lost Canada West Semi-Finals	
2023–24	Lisa Thomiadis	19–1	1672	1037	1st	Canada West Champions	Lost championship finals
2024–25	Lisa Thomiadis	18–2	1673	957	1st, Prairie	Canada West Champions	2025 National Champions
2025–26	Lisa Thomiadis	20–0	—	—	1st, Prairie	Lost Canada West Semi-Finals	2026 National Champions

=== Recent U Sports Tournament results ===
Year	Seed	Round	Opponent	Result
2016	#2	First Round; Semi-Finals; Gold Medal Game	#7 Ottawa Gee-Gees #3 Saint Mary's Huskies #5 Ryerson Rams	W 73–62; W 65–58; W 85–71
2017	#2	First Round; Con. Semi-Finals; 5th-Place Game	#7 Laval Rouge et Or #6 Cape Breton Capers #5 Regina Cougars	L 59–69; W 65–51; L 76–79
2018	#6	First Round; Semi-Finals; Gold Medal Game	#3 Acadia Axewomen #2 Regina Cougars #1 Carleton Ravens	W 72–67; W 74–71; L 48-69
2019	#3	First Round; Semi-Finals; Bronze Medal Game	#6 Acadia Axewomen #2 McMaster Marauders #4 Ottawa Gee-Gees	W 77–69; L 66–73; L 62–63
2020	#1	First Round; Semi-Finals; Gold Medal Game	#8 Carleton Ravens #4 Laval Rouge et Or #2 Brock Badgers	W 73–59; W 76–57; W 82–61
2022	#2	First Round; Con. Semi-Finals; 5th-Place Game	#7 Queen's #6 Laval Rouge et Or #8 UPEI Panthers	L 55–62; W 71–49; W 80–48

== Statistics ==
=== Individual Leader Scoring ===
Legend
GP	Games played	GS	Games started	MIN	Minutes played
FG	Field-goals	3FG	3-point field-goals	FT	Free-throws
PTS	Points	AVG	Points per game

Season	Player	GP	Min	FG	3FG	FT	Pts	Avg	Canada West Rank
2018-19	Sabine Dukate	20	537	117	67	11	312	15.6	13th
2019-20	Summer Masikewich	20	565	127	0	112	366	18.3	Fifth

=== Canada West Statistical Leaders ===
==== 3-PT Field Goal Percentage ====
- 2019-20: Sabine Dukate - 59 three point field goals, 157 three point field goals attempted, .376 percentage

=== All-Time Leaders ===
==== Scoring ====
Points	Player	Years
1999	Sarah Crooks	2002-07
1491	Sabine Dukate	2015-20
1605	Ashley Dutchak	2002-07
1580	Dalyce Emmerson	2011-16
1491	Sabine Dukate	2015-20
1402	Nancy Brentnell	1975-79, 1980-81
1330	Allison Fairbrother	1993-97, 1998-99
1324	Kim Tulloch	2006-11
1293	Kim Grant	1993-98
1112	Summer Masikewich	2016-20

== International ==
- Megan Lindquist Saskatchewan Canada 2017 Summer Universiade
- Megan Ahlstrom Canada: 2019 Summer Universiade
- Kyla Shand Canada: 2019 Summer Universiade
- Lisa Thomaidis: Canada Head coach 2015 Pan American Games Gold Medal, 2015 FIBA Americas Gold Medal, 2016 Rio Olympics (7th place)

== Awards and honours ==
- Lisa Thomaidis, 2016 CAAWS Women of Influence Award

=== Canada West Awards ===
- 2005-06 Sarah Crooks, Canada West Player of the Year
- 2006-07 Sarah Crooks, Canada West Player of the Year
- Lisa Thomaidis: Canada West Coach of the Year - 2004, 2006, 2009, 2011 and 2016

==== Canada West Hall of Fame ====
- Sarah Crooks: 2020 inductee

=== U Sports Awards ===
- 2005-06 Sarah Crooks, Nan Copp Award
- 2006-07 Sarah Crooks, Nan Copp Award
- Lisa Thomaidis: 2008-09 Canadian Interuniversity Sport Coach of the Year
- Lisa Thomaidis: 2010-11 Canadian Interuniversity Sport Coach of the Year
- Antoinette Miller, Top 100 U Sports women's basketball Players of the Century (1920-2020).
- 2024-25 Gage Grassick, Nan Copp Award
- 2024-25 Gage Grassick, Lois and Doug Mitchell Athlete of the Year award

==== All-Canadians ====
- 2005-06: Sarah Crooks, Canadian Interuniversity Sport First-Team All-Canadian
- 2006-07: Sarah Crooks, Canadian Interuniversity Sport First-Team All-Canadian
- 2018-19: Sabine Dukate, U First Team All-Canadian

==== U Sports Nationals ====
- 2015-16: Dalyce Emmerson, U Sports championship MVP
- 2019-20: Sabine Dukate, U Sports championship MVP
- 2024-24: Gage Grassick, U Sports championship MVP
- 2025-26: Ella Murphy Wiebe, U Sports championship MVP

All-Tournament Team

- 2019-20: Sabine Dukate, Saskatchewan
- 2019-20: Summer Masikewich, Saskatchewan

=== University awards ===
- 2020 Valerie Girsberger Trophy (in recognition of leadership, sportsmanship, academic ability): Megan Ahlstrom
- Colb McEwon Trophy: 2006, 2009, 2011, 2016, 2020 (Saskatchewan Huskies Athletics Coach of the Year) - Lisa Thomaidis
