= Laval Rouge et Or women's basketball =

Women's college basketball team

- University: Université Laval
- Head coach: Guilaume Giroux (6th year season)
- Location: Laval, Québec
- Arena: Amphithéâtre-gymnase Desjardins
- Conference: Réseau du sport étudiant du Québec
- Nickname: Rouge et Or
- Colors: Red, Gold, and Black

U Sports tournament appearances
- 1976, 1987, 1989, 1991, 1992, 1996, 2000, 2001, 2002, 2003, 2005, 2006, 2007, 2008, 2009, 2010, 2011, 2015, 2017, 2018, 2019, 2020, 2022

Conference tournament champions
- 1976, 1987, 1989, 1992, 2000, 2001, 2002, 2003, 2005, 2006, 2007, 2008, 2009, 2010, 2011, 2019, 2020, 2022

Conference regular-season champions
- 1989, 1992, 2000, 2001, 2002, 2003, 2005, 2006, 2007, 2008, 2009, 2010, 2017, 2018, 2019

Uniforms
Home	Away

The Laval Rouge et Or women's basketball team represent Université Laval in the Réseau du sport étudiant du Québec of U Sports women's basketball.

== History ==
At the 2019 U Sports Women's Basketball Championship, the Rouge et Or were the #1 seeded team. Heading into Nationals, the Rouge et Or sported a 17-1 won-loss record. The only loss took place versus the McGill Martlets in the final game of the season. The scoring leader during the 2018-19 season was Jane Gagne, averaging 15.4 points per game.

During August 2020, Claudia Émond was one of 18 former U Sports student-athletes announced among the inaugural participants of the U SPORTS Female Apprenticeship Coach Program. Funded through Sport Canada, the objective was to increase the number of females in coaching positions across Canadian universities, matching apprentice coaches who have recently graduated with a mentor coach.

== International ==
- Sarah-Jane Marois Canada: 2019 Summer Universiade

== Awards and honors ==
=== U Sports Awards ===
- Sarah Jane Marois: 2019 Nan Copp Award
- Khaléann Caron-Goudreau, 2019 Defensive Player of the Year

==== Peter Ennis Award ====
The Peter Ennis Award is awarded to the U Sports women's basketball Coach of the Year.

- 2018-19: Guilaume Giroux
- 2000-01: Linda Marquis
- 1999-00: Linda Marquis

==== U Sports National Tournament ====
- Nike Top Performers - March 8, 2020 - Bronze Medal Game: UPEI vs. Laval - Laval: Kim Letang

=== U Sports All-Canadians ===
- 2019 First Team All-Canadian: Sarah-Jane Marois

=== RSEQ All-Stars ===
First Team

- 2019 First Team All-Star: Sarah-Jane Marois

Second Team

- 2019 Second Team All-Star: Claudia Émond

=== Top 100 ===
In March 2020, Rouge et Or basketball players Isabelle Grenier, Marie-Michelle Genois and Sarah-Jane Marois Were named to the list of the Top 100 U Sports Women’s Basketball Players of the Century (2011-2020).
