= Regina Cougars =

Athletic teams of the University of Regina

University of Regina Cougars
- University: University of Regina
- Nickname: Cougars
- Association: U Sports
- Conference: Canada West
- Location: Regina, Saskatchewan
- Colors: Green and Gold
- Mascot: Reggie the Cougar and Ram-page
- Website: www.reginacougars.com

The Regina Cougars are the athletic teams that represent the University of Regina in Regina, Saskatchewan, Canada. The Cougars compete in all sports except football; the university's football team is known as the Regina Rams.

A number of the Regina women's ice hockey team players were featured in the filming of the Canadian comedy television series, Road Hockey Rumble.

== Varsity teams ==
Men's sports	Women's sports
Basketball	Basketball
Cross country	Cross country
Football	Ice hockey
Ice hockey	Soccer
Swimming	Swimming
Track and field	Track and field
	Volleyball

== Awards and honours ==
=== Athletes of the Year ===
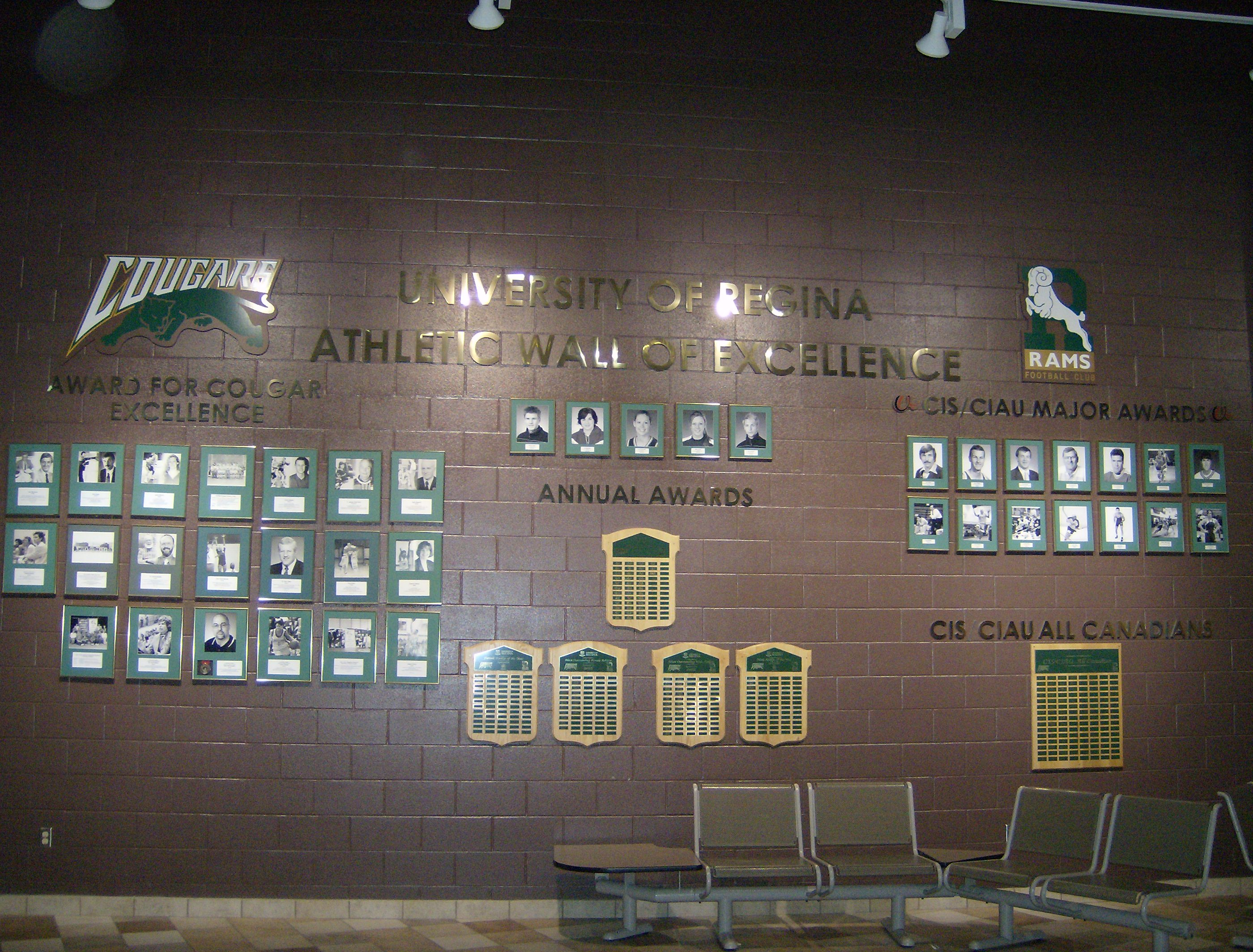
U of R Athletic Wall of Excellence

Year	Female athlete	Sport	Male athlete	Sport	Ref.
2019–20	Joely Welburn	Track and Field	Carter Millar	Basketball	
2020–21	Cancelled due to the COVID-19 pandemic.				
2021–22	Joely Welburn	Track and Field	Benjamin Hillis	Basketball	
2022–23	Jade Belmore	Basketball	Anthony Bennett; Usheoritse Itsekiri	Football; Track & Field	
2023–24	Jade Belmore	Basketball	Jonathan Podbielski	Track & Field	

=== Canada West Hall of Fame ===
- Cymone Bouchard, Basketball: Canada West Hall of Fame - 2019 Inductee
