= McCalmon =

McCalmon is a surname. Notable people with the surname include:

- Eddie McCalmon (1902–1987), Canadian ice hockey player
- Jake McCalmon (born 1986), American politician
- Jason McCalmon (born 1987), English boxer
