= Saskatchewan Huskies =

University of Saskatchewan athletic teams

- University: University of Saskatchewan
- Nickname: Huskies
- Association: U Sports
- Conference: Canada West
- Athletic director: Shannon Chin
- Location: Saskatoon, Saskatchewan
- Varsity teams: 12 (5 men's, 4 women's, 3 co-ed)
- Football stadium: Griffiths Stadium
- Basketball arena: Physical Activity Complex
- Ice hockey arena: Merlis Belsher Place
- Soccer stadium: Griffiths Stadium
- Outdoor track and field venue: Saskatoon Field House
- Volleyball arena: Physical Activity Complex
- Colors: Green and white
- Mascot: Howler The Huskie
- Fight song: "Saskatchewan, Our University"
- Website: huskies.usask.ca
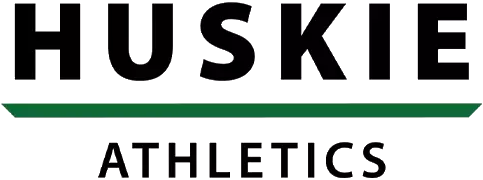

The Saskatchewan Huskies are the athletics teams representing the University of Saskatchewan in Saskatoon, Saskatchewan. The university began their athletics program in 1907 and has competed with others since 1911. They currently compete in elite inter-university competition administered by U Sports and its members, both as regions and as individual institutions.

The University of Saskatchewan is a member of the Canada West Regional Association, one of four such associations within U Sports. The Huskie Athletics program is administered at the University of Saskatchewan by the college of Kinesiology. At various times in its history, Huskie Athletics has offered teams in 24 different sports. At present date, there are 15 teams in the following sports: men's Canadian football and both men's and women's teams in basketball, cross country, ice hockey, soccer, track and field, volleyball, and wrestling.

Both the football and soccer teams play their home games at Griffiths Stadium, while the men and women's hockey teams play at Merlis Belsher Place.

== Varsity teams ==
Men's sports	Women's sports
Basketball	Basketball
Football	Ice hockey
Ice hockey	Soccer
Soccer	Volleyball
Volleyball	
Co-ed sports
Cross country
Track and field
Wrestling

=== Football ===
The football program at the University of Saskatchewan is one of the more successful programs. They have captured 18 Canada West championships, appeared in 9 Vanier Cup games, winning 3 of them. They play their games at Griffiths Stadium and have hosted many playoff games, including the 2006 Vanier Cup.

=== Men's ice hockey ===
The University of Saskatchewan men's hockey team played their first season in 1909–10. The current program consists of former major junior and junior A hockey players from across Canada. Since 2018, the Huskies play their home games at Merlis Belsher Place, which replaced Rutherford Arena. The Huskies won their ninth Canada West Championship during the 2015–16 season. In 2017, the Huskies lost the University Cup final by a score of 5–3 to the University of New Brunswick. In 1983, the Huskies won their only University Cup.

The Huskies have a list of alumni who have played or coached in the National Hockey League. Among those included are Mike Babcock, the former coach of the Toronto Maple Leafs, and Todd McLellan, the current coach of the Los Angeles Kings. In 2017, Huskie's goaltender Jordan Cooke was the first active U Sports player to be named to Team Canada's Spengler Cup roster.

=== Women's ice hockey ===
Women have been playing hockey at the University as early as 1912. During the 2009–10 season, Breanne George scored a conference-high 28 goals and 18 assists for a league-leading 46 points in 24 games. Fifth-year Huskies forward Julie Paetsch was named the 2011–12 Canada West women’s hockey Player of the Year. The Huskies alternate captain, Paetsch finished the season as the Canada West leader in scoring with 34 points. Her 14 goals and 20 assists were accumulated in 24 games as the Huskies enjoyed a won-loss record of 16–6–2.

=== Women's Soccer ===
The University of Saskatchewan women's soccer program played for the first time in an official league in the 1984–85 season. The Huskies play their home games at Griffiths Stadium. The Huskies made their first appearance in the U Sports women's soccer Championship in 2016.

Notable alumni from the program include Kaylyn Kyle, a former Canadian international, as well as Jadyn Steinhauer, Jade Houmphanh, and Erica Hindmarsh, who were part of the Canadian women's national futsal team which won the inaugural CONCACAF W Futsal Championship in May 2025 alongside Huskies head coach Jerson Barandica-Hamilton, who served as assistant coach on the national futsal team.

=== Women's Basketball ===
Originally playing as 'the Huskiettes', the University of Saskatchewan women's basketball program first won major honours in 1949, winning the Canadian Western University Championship with a team that featured Sylvia Fedoruk as co-captain. The Huskies play their home games at the Physical Activity Complex. The first national tournament win came in the 2015–16 season, where the Huskies defeated the Ryerson Rams 85–71 to win the 2016 CIS Women's Basketball Championship. In the U Sports women's basketball championship, the Huskies have won 3 gold medals, 3 silver medals, and one bronze. In all three national wins for the Huskies the team has been coached by Lisa Thomaidas. Both Sarah Crooks (2005–06, 2006–07) and Gage Grassick (2024–25) have won the national Player of the Year award. Their perfect regular season in 2025-26 was their second in program history, having previously gone unbeaten during the regular season in 1971-72.

=== Women's Volleyball ===
Founded in 1949, the Huskies have won three national championships, all of which were consecutive (1978-79, 1980-81, and 1981-82). In doing so, the team became the first across all sports in Canadian Interuniversity Athletic Union to win three successive championships. The teams from this championship-winning three-year run were inducted into the Canada West Hall of Fame. The team plays its home games at the Physical Activity Complex.

== Awards and standings ==
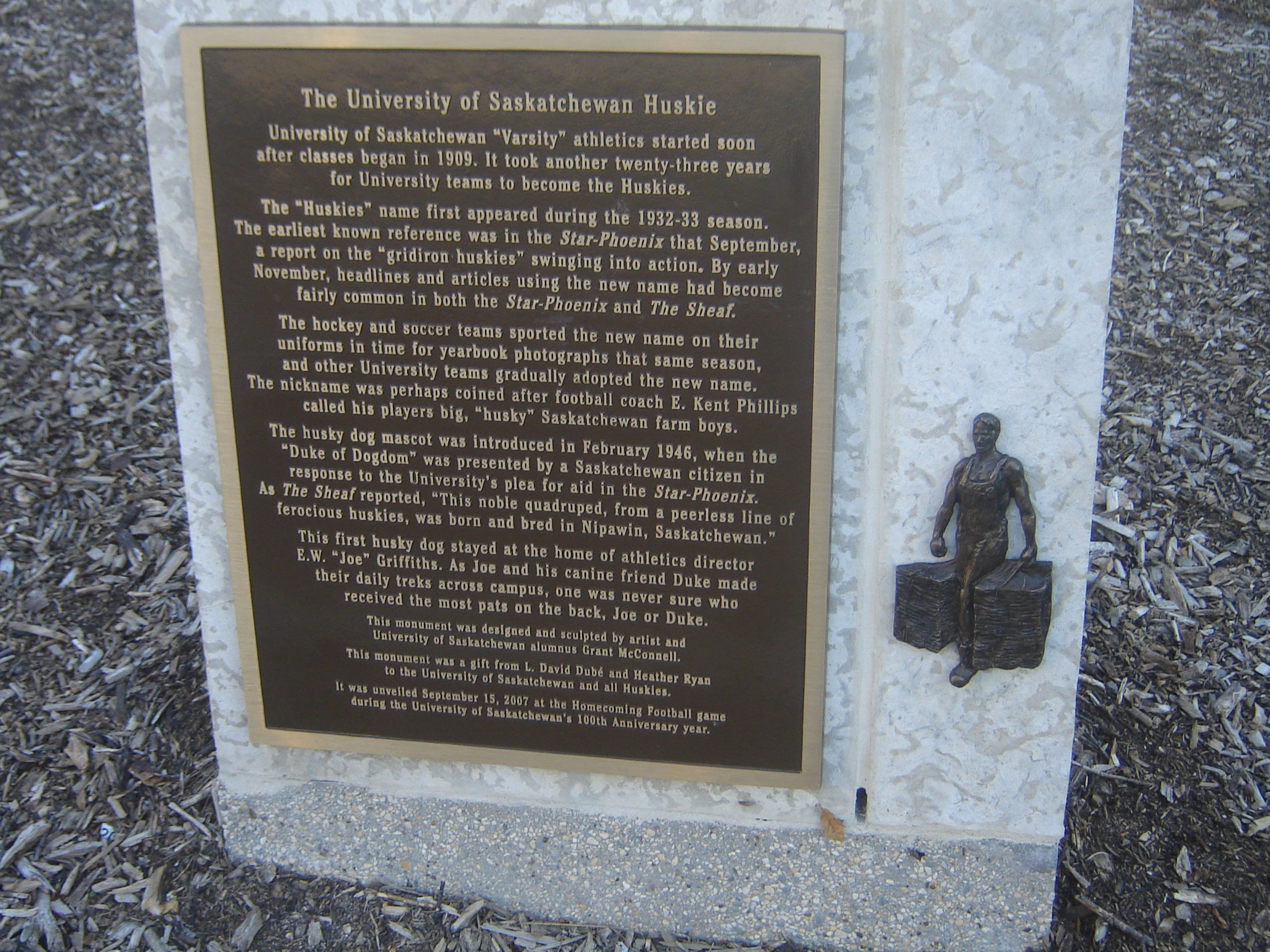
University of Saskatchewan Huskie plaque

The Huskies are year after year one of the top sport schools in Canada. The football team is recognized as one of the strongest programs in U Sports. The football team has won the Vanier Cup as National Champions on 3 occasions (1990, 1996, and 1998) and have been runners up on 8 occasions.

The men's volleyball has been national champions on four occasions, in 1979, 1988, 1999, and 2004. The U of S Huskies have also recently achieved success in men's and women's basketball, and wrestling.

The most successful Huskie team is the Men's and Women's Track and Field teams. Combined they have won the Canada West conference championship 38 times and the national championships 12 times. Most of these championships were won under the leadership of Lyle Sanderson, who was inducted into the Saskatchewan Sports Hall of Fame.

=== Championships ===
Sport	Nat. titles	Years	Nat. app.	Year	Conf. titles	Years	Ref.
Basketball (men's)	1	2009–10	7	1981–82, 1985–86, 1987–88, 2005–06, 2009–10, 2010–11, 2013–14, 2014–15)	1	2009–10	
Basketball (women's)	4	2015–16, 2019–20, 2024–25, 2025–26	10	1982–83, 2005–06, 2007–08, 2008–09, 2009–10, 2010–11, 2011–12, 2013–14, 2014–15, 2015–16, 2016–17)	5	2005–06, 2010–11, 2013–14, 2015–16, 2016–17	
Cross country (men's)	1	1968	6	1968, 2009, 2010, 2011, 2012, 2013	2	1978, 1979	
Cross country (women's)	0		8	2005, 2006, 2007, 2009, 2010, 2011, 2012, 2013)	0		
Curling (men's)	0		1	2011-12)		N/A	
Curling (women's)	0		1	2011-12)		N/A	
Football	3	1990, 1996, 1998	9	1989, 1990, 1994, 1996, 1998, 2002, 2004, 2005, 2006	20	1930, 1934, 1935, 1936, 1937, 1938, 1941, 1965, 1974, 1989, 1990, 1991, 1994, 1996, 1998, 1999, 2002, 2004, 2005, 2006	
Ice hockey (men's)	1	1982–83	19	1966–67, 1980–81, 1981–82, 1982–83, 1986–87, 1997–98, 1998–99, 1999–00, 2001–02, 2004–05, 2005–06, 2006–07, 2007–08, 2011–12, 2012–13, 2013–14, 2015–16, 2016–17, 2017–18)	15	1926–27, 1929–30, 1951–52, 1952–53, 1958–59, 1980–81, 1981–82, 1982–83, 1986–87, 1997–98, 1998–99, 1999–00, 2006–07, 2011–12, 2015–16	
Ice hockey (women's)	0		4	2003–04, 2013–14, 2017–18, 2023-24)	1	2013–14	
Soccer (women's)	0		2	2013, 2014	1	2014	
Swimming (men's)	0		8	1956–57, 1957–58, 1966–67, 1968–69, 1969–70, 1970–71, 1971–72, 1972–73)	0		
Swimming (women's)	0		1	1989–90	0		
Track and field (men's)	5	1969–70, 1970–71, 1986–87, 2001–02, 2004–05	N/A		19	1967–68, 1969–70, 1970–71, 1973–74, 1975–76, 1976–77, 1980–81, 1986–87, 1996–97, 1997–98, 1999–00, 2000–01, 2001–02, 2002–03, 2003–04, 2004–05, 2006–07, 2012–13, 2015–16	
Track and field (women's)	7	1984–85 (tie), 1985–86, 1999–2000, 2000–01, 2002–03, 2003–04, 2004–05)	N/A		22	1969–70(tie), 1970–71, 1974–75, 1976–77, 1979–80, 1981–82, 1983–84, 1984–85, 1985–86, 1987–88, 1994-95(tie), 1996–97, 1997–98, 1998–99, 1999–00, 2000–01, 2002–03, 2003–04, 2008–09, 2009–10, 2011–12, 2017–18	
Volleyball (men's)	4	1978–79, 1987–88, 1998–99, 2003–04	18	1978–79, 1979–80, 1984–85, 1985–86, 1986–87, 1987–88, 1989–90, 1994–95, 1996–97, 1997–98, 1998–99, 1999–00, 2000–01, 2002–03, 2003–04, 2004–05, 2005–06, 2015–16	11	1978–79, 1979–80, 1984–85, 1985–86, 1986–87, 1987–88, 1989–90, 1997–98, 1999–00, 2001–02, 2003–04	
Volleyball (women's)	3	1978–79, 1979–80, 1980–81	16	1971–72, 1974–75, 1978–79, 1979–80, 1980–81, 1983–84, 1984–85, 1988–89, 1990–91, 1991–92, 1996–97, 1997–98, 1998–99, 2000–01, 2003–04, 2004–05	7	1974–75, 1978–79, 1979–80, 1980–81, 1983–84, 1990–91, 1991–92	
Wrestling (men's)	0		N/A		4	2015–16, 1985–86, 1983–84, 1981–82	
Wrestling (women's)	0		N/A		1	2016–17	

Note: The Huskies no longer participate in field hockey and swimming.

== Notable alumni ==
=== Basketball ===
- Sarah Crooks, CIS 4x All Canadian, CIS 2x Nann Copp Trophy Winner, Canadian National Team player
- Andrew Spagrud, 2003–04 CIS Dr. Peter Mullins Trophy winner

=== Cross-Country ===
- Jamie Epp, 2xCIAU/CIS Champion and MVP (2000, 2002), 4xAll XC All Canadian, 5x Canadian National Team Member (1999 World Jr XC, 1999 Pan Am Jr Track, 2000 & 2002 FISU XC, 2003 World Sr. XC). Was also a 12x CIAU/CIS medallist in Track and Field

=== Hockey ===
==== Men's ====
- Jon Barkman, forward, 2001–02 CIS Senator Joseph A. Sullivan Award winner, 2001–02 CIS R.W. Pugh Award winner
- Robin Bartel, former defense, Calgary Flames and Vancouver Canucks
- Jason Becker, defense, 1995-96 CIS Clare Drake Award winner
- Dave Chambers, former head coach of the Huskies ice hockey team and the Quebec Nordiques.
- Gerry Couture, former forward, Detroit Red Wings, Montreal Canadiens and Chicago Blackhawks
- Willie Desjardins, forward, 1982-83 CIS Major W.J. "Danny" McLeod Award winner
- Dave Dunn, former defense, Vancouver Canucks and Toronto Maple Leafs
- Bill Hay, former forward, Chicago Blackhawks
- Dave King, former head coach, Calgary Flames and Columbus Blue Jackets, 1979-80 CIS Father George Kehoe Memorial Award winner
- Ed Litzenberger, former forward, Montreal Canadiens, Toronto Maple Leafs, Detroit Red Wings and Chicago Blackhawks
- Ken Lovsin, former defense, Washington Capitals, 1994 Olympic silver medal, Ice Hockey
- Charlie Mason, former forward, New York Rangers, New York Americans, Detroit Red Wings and Chicago Blackhawks
- Eddie McCalmon, former forward, Chicago Blackhawks and Philadelphia Quakers
- Ross McKay, former goaltender, Hartford Whalers
- Earl Miller, former forward, Chicago Blackhawks and Toronto Maple Leafs

=== Soccer ===
- Kaylyn Kyle, midfielder, former Canadian National Team player, 2012 Olympic bronze medal
- Brett Levis, midfielder, FC Tulsa player

=== Track and field ===
- Cyprian Enweani, 1988 Summer Olympian, 200 metres, 1988 Summer Olympian, 4 X 100 metre
- Kelsie Hendry, 2002–03, 2003–04, 2004–05 CIS Women's Outstanding Track Athlete winner, 2008 Summer Olympian, Pole Vault, 2010 Commonwealth Games, Pole Vault, Bronze Medal
- Courtney Hufsmith, 2019 FISU bronze medallist in 1500m Athletics at the 2019 Summer Universiade – Women's 1500 metres

=== Volleyball ===
- Averie Allard, 2017-23, Canadian national team player
- Levi Olson, 2018-2023, Canada West All-Star 2023, Czechia Extraliga Volleyball Professional Athlete, Germany Bundesliga Volleyball Professional Athlete, Sweden Volleyball Professional Athlete.
- Dylan Mortensen, 2016-2023, U Sports All Canadian 2023, Canada West All-Star 2018-2023, U Sports Rookie of the Year 2018, Canadian Men's National Volleyball Team
- Colin Fraser, 2014-2019 Canada West All Star 2014-2019, Switzerland Volleyball Professional Athlete
- Bryan Fraser, 2009-2014 Canada West Universities Athletic Association All Star Team 2012-2013 & 2013–2014. Canada men's national volleyball team 2015–present, United Volleys 2015–2016, Abiant Lycurgus 2016-2017
- Kris Brand, Outside Hitter VC Franken, Indios de Mayaguez, Knack Randstad Roeselare
- Tom Graham, 1986-87 CIS Men's Volleyball Coach of the Year winner

== Awards and honors ==
The Saskatchewan Huskies athletics awards are known as the Major 7. The Female Athlete of the Year is awarded the Mary Ethel Cartwright Trophy, while the Male Athlete of the Year is the recipient of the E. Kent Phillips Trophy. Given to the Men's Rookie of the Year is the Howard Nixon Trophy. The Huskies' Female Rookie of the Year is bestowed the Patricia Lawson Trophy.

In recognition of an All-Around Female Athlete that has demonstrated leadership, sportsmanship, academic ability and athletic prowess, the Valerie Girsberger Trophy is awarded. Recognizing a male athlete's highest qualities of sportsmanship and citizenship, the Rusty MacDonald Cup is awarded. The Huskies award for the Coach of the Year is known as the Colb McEwon Trophy. As a side note, the Huskies also recognize trainers with the Dr. Walter Hader Student Trainer of the Year award.

=== Athletes of the Year ===
This is an incomplete list

Year	Female athlete	Sport	Male athlete	Sport
1980	Tracy Kelly		Grant Gudmundson	Volleyball
1981	Rosalie Flynn		Del Chapman; Willie Desjardins	Hockey
1982	Tracy Kelly		Murray & Mark Reddekopp	Basketball
1983	Gwen Wall	Track	Willie Desjardins	Hockey
1984	Gwen Wall	Track	Tim Leier	Hockey
1985	Gwen Wall	Track	Gerald Lashyn	Football
1986	Gwen Wall	Track	Darcey Busse; Marshall Toner	Volleyball; Football/Hockey/Track
1987	Sherry Miller		Jerome Linnell	Volleyball
1988	Janet Scott	Track	Brian Gavlas; Byron Tokarchuk	volleyball Basketball
1989	Shannon Kekula	Track	Sheldom Ryma	Basketball
1990	Vanessa Monar	Track	Scott Reeves	Wrestling
1991	Stacey Singler	Volleyball	Kim Pasloski	Hockey
1992	Janice Beland	Track	Imran Akhtar	Wrestling
1993	Seema Kamal	track	Dean Wiebe; Wayde Bucsis	basketball hockey
1994	Samantha Simpson	Soccer	Dean Wiebe	Basketball
1995	Tanya Lypka	Track	Brent Schneider	Football
1996	Denise Meier	volleyball	Brian Purdy	Hockey
1997	Natalie Lukiw	volleyball	James Repesse	Football
1998	Seema Kamal	Track	Warren Muzika; Scott Schutz	Football; Volleyball
1999	Chelsea Grimson	volleyball	Warren Muzika	Football
2000	Kristin Hagel; Jacqueline Lavallee	Soccer; Basketball	Sheldon Moser	Hockey
2001	Karla Johnson	Track	Reid Bilben	Volleyball
2002			Jon Barkman	Hockey
2003	Kelsie Hendry	Track	Jamie Epp	Cross country
2004	Kelsie Hendry	Track	Adam Ens	Volleyball
2005	Kelsie Hendry	Track	Steve Bilan	Football
2006	Sarah Crooks	Basketball	David Stevens	Football
2007	Sarah Crooks	Basketball	Jeff Adamson	Wrestling
2008	Adrianne Vangool	Track	Andrew Spagrud	Basketball
2009	Jill Gallays	Wrestling	Steven DaSilva	Hockey
2010	Breanne George	Hockey	Showron Glover	Basketball
2011	Taryn Suttie	Track & Field	Daniel Olver	Wrestling
2012	Sharai Siemens	Track & Field	Jerson Barandica-Hamilton	Soccer
2013	Koren Pitkethly	Wrestling	Kit Hillis	Football
2014	Dalyce Emmerson	Basketball	Derek Hulak	Hockey
2015	Annie Monteith	Wrestling	Mark Ingram	Football
2016	Laura Dally	Basketball	Jordon Cooke	Hockey
2017	Astrid Nyame	Track & Field	Jordon Cooke	Hockey
2018	Julie Labach	Track & Field	Kieran Johnston	track & field
2019	Julie Labach	Track & Field	Taran Kozun	Ice Hockey
2020	Michelle Harrison	Track and Field	Taran Kozun	Hockey

==== Canada West Hall of Fame ====
- Brent Schneider, Football: 2019–20 inductee (inaugural class)
- Willie Desjardin, Men's Hockey: 2019–20 inductee (inaugural class)
- Huskies, Men's Hockey, 1980–1983: 2019–20 inductee (inaugural class)
- Darcey Busse, Men's Volleyball: 2019–20 inductee (inaugural class)
- Adam Ens, Men's Volleyball: 2019–20 inductee (inaugural class)
- Lyle Sanderson, Men's Track & Field: 2019–20 inductee (inaugural class)
- Gordon Garvie, Men's Wrestling: 2019–20 inductee (inaugural class)
- Jamie Epp, Men's Cross-Country/Track & Field: 2019–20 inductee (inaugural class)
- Sarah Crooks, Women's Basketball: 2019–20 inductee (inaugural class)
- Breanne George, Women's Hockey: 2019–20 inductee (inaugural class)
- Mark Tennant, Women's Volleyball: 2019–20 inductee (inaugural class)
- Huskiettes, Volleyball, 1978–81: 2019–20 inductee (inaugural class)
- Kelsie Hendry, Women's Track & Field: 2019–20 inductee (inaugural class)
- Ethel Mary Cartwright, Builder-General: 2019–20 inductee (inaugural class)
- Dr. Sylvia Fedoruk, Builder- BB, VB, Track: 2019–20 inductee (inaugural class)
- Pat Jackson, Builder: 2019–20 inductee (inaugural class)
- Val Schneider, Builder: 2019–20 inductee (inaugural class)
- Diane Jones-Konihowski: Women's Track and Field: 2019–20 inductee (inaugural class)
