= Caia Morstad =

Canadian volleyball player (born 1982)

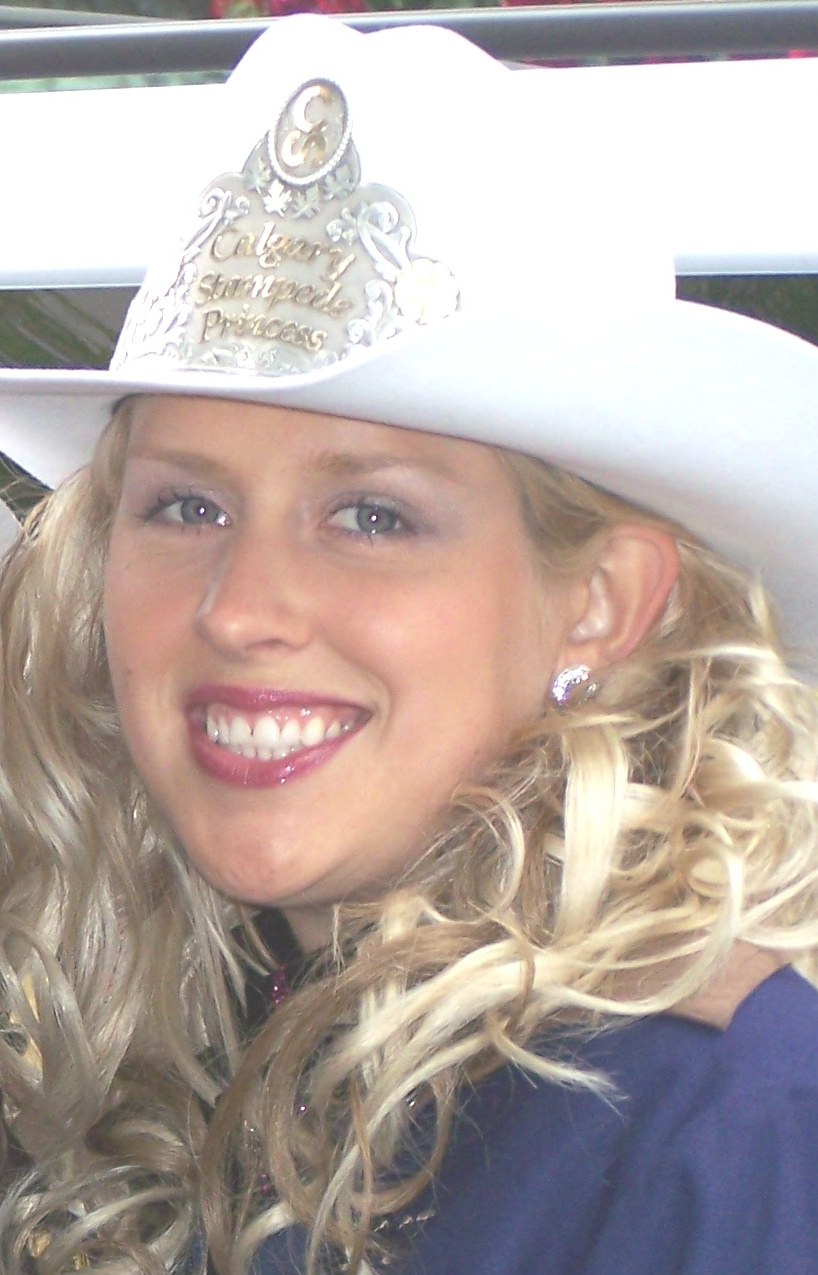
- Morstad as 2007 Calgary Stampede Princess

Personal information
- Nationality: Canadian
- Born: September 14, 1982 (age 43)
- Home town: Swift Current, Saskatchewan
- Education: Middle Tennessee State University; University of Saskatchewan; Southern Alberta Institute of Technology
- Height: 5 ft 11 in (1.80 m)

Sport
- Sport: Volleyball
- College team: Middle Tennessee Blue Raiders; Saskatchewan Huskies; SAIT Trojans

Caia Morstad (born September 14, 1982) is a Canadian athlete who was a competitive volleyball player and Calgary Stampede Princess. She has played volleyball for the Middle Tennessee Blue Raiders, University of Saskatchewan Huskies, and the SAIT Trojans. She has also played beach volleyball, competing in the 2001 Canada Games, on behalf of Saskatchewan.

As a jewelry designer, specializing in sterling silver, she ran a jewelry business called "Twizted Princess".

== Early life ==
Caia Morstad was born to Grant and Maureen Morstad on September 14, 1982. Morstad grew up on a farm just outside of Swift Current, Saskatchewan. In grade seven, she started playing volleyball at school. Morstad completed high school in Swift Current.

== Stampede Princess ==
Morstad was named Stampede Princess 2007 by the Calgary Stampede. She was part of the "Royal Trio", along with Stampede Queen Amanda Kochan and fellow Stampede Princess Amanda Byrne. As part of her duties, she made over 400 appearances throughout North America.

== Volleyball ==
=== Middle Tennessee State University ===
At age 17, Morstad was admitted on a full scholarship by Middle Tennessee State to play NCAA Division I volleyball as a Blue Raider. While there, she majored in physics.

=== University of Saskatchewan ===
Morstad obtained a degree in Agriculture Economics from the University of Saskatchewan. While attending, she played for the university's Huskies volleyball team. After graduating, Morstad became a business and financial analyst in Calgary.

=== SAIT ===
Morstad enrolled in the Petroleum Engineering Technology program at Southern Alberta Institute of Technology in Calgary, Alberta. Morstad was an outside hitter for the SAIT Trojans Women's Volleyball team, joining in September 2011.
