= Nammi Nguyen =

Vietnamese footballer (born 2003)

Personal information
- Full name: Nguyễn Hoàng Nam Mi
- Date of birth: 24 June 2003 (age 23)
- Place of birth: Saskatoon, Canada
- Height: 1.65 m (5 ft 5 in)
- Position: Midfielder

Team information
- Current team: Saskatchewan Huskies
- Number: 8

College career
Years	Team	Apps	(Gls)
2021–2023	Ottawa Gee-Gees		
2023–	Saskatchewan Huskies	40	(1)

Senior career*
Years	Team	Apps	(Gls)
2025	Hồ Chí Minh City		
- * Club domestic league appearances and goals

Nguyễn Hoàng Nam Mi (born 24 June 2003) is a Canadian footballer who plays as a midfielder for Saskatchewan Huskies.

== Early life ==
Nguyen was born on 24 June 2003 in Saskatoon, Canada and is a native of the city. The daughter of Vietnamese electrical engineering professor Ha Hoang Nguyen, she has two siblings and started playing football at the age of four.

Growing up, she competed in cross country running. After that, she attended the University of Ottawa in Canada and the University of Saskatchewan in Canada, where she studied supply chain management.

== College career ==
After two years playing for the Ottawa Gee-Gees, Nguyen transferred to the University of Saskatchewan Huskies for the 2023 season. She was named to the Canada West second team all-star list for the 2024 season.

== Club career ==
During the summer of 2025, Nguyen signed for Vietnamese side Hồ Chí Minh City to feature in the AFC Women's Club Championship.

Nguyen was part of the Saskatoon Green & White team which reached the final of the 2026 Futsal Canadian Championship in April 2026.

== International career ==
Nguyen was called up to Vietnam national team, being named in the preliminary list for the 2026 AFC Women's Asian Cup qualification, but did not make the final cut.
