= 2025 U Sports Women's Volleyball Championship =

Canadian university volleyball championship

- Season: 2024–25
- Teams: Eight
- Finals site: Investors Group Athletic Centre; Winnipeg, Manitoba
- Champions: Manitoba Bisons (8th title)
- Runner-up: Montréal Carabins
- Winning coach: Ken Bentley (7th title)
- Championship MVP: Raya Surinx (Manitoba)
- Television: CBC

The 2025 U Sports Women's Volleyball Championship was held March 14–16, 2025, in Winnipeg, Manitoba, to determine a national champion for the 2024–25 U Sports women's volleyball season. The third-seeded host Manitoba Bisons defeated the fifth-seeded Montréal Carabins 3–1 to win the program's eighth national championship, which broke the tie for second-most in U Sports women's volleyball. The Bisons won as the hosts for the second time in program history, after having also accomplished the feat in 2001. The Carabins matched their best finish with a silver medal, having also finished second in 2008.

== Host ==
The tournament was hosted by the University of Manitoba at the Investors Group Athletic Centre on the school's campus. This was the third time that Manitoba had hosted the tournament with the most recent occurring in 2001.

== Scheduled teams ==
Seed	Team	Qualified	Record	Last	Total
1	Alberta Pandas	Canada West Champion	17–3	2007	7
2	UBC Thunderbirds	Canada West Finalist	15–5	2024	14
3	Manitoba Bisons	Canada West Bronze (Host)	16–4	2014	7
4	McMaster Marauders	OUA Champion	14–6	None	0
5	Montréal Carabins	RSEQ Champion	19–2	None	0
6	Saint Mary's Huskies	AUS Champion	14–6	None	0
7	Saskatchewan Huskies	Canada West Semi-Finalist	10–10	1981	3
8	Memorial Sea-Hawks	AUS Finalist	10–10	None	0

== Championship bracket ==
First Round: March 14
1	Alberta Pandas	3
8	Memorial Sea-Hawks	0
4	McMaster Marauders	2
5	Montréal Carabins	3
2	UBC Thunderbirds	3
7	Saskatchewan Huskies	0
3	Manitoba Bisons	3
6	Saint Mary's Huskies	0

Semi-Finals: March 15
1	Alberta Pandas	0
5	Montréal Carabins	3
2	UBC Thunderbirds	1
3	Manitoba Bisons	3

Gold Medal Game: March 16
3	Manitoba Bisons	3
5	Montréal Carabins	1
Bronze Medal Game: March 16
1	Alberta Pandas	3
2	UBC Thunderbirds	1

=== Bronze medal match ===
March 16, 2025; 3:00 p.m. CDT	(1) Alberta Pandas	3–1	(2) UBC Thunderbirds	Investors Group Athletic Centre; Winnipeg, Manitoba; Attendance: 250
March 16, 2025; 3:00 p.m. CDT	(25–21, 28–30, 25–22, 25–18); Boxscore			Investors Group Athletic Centre; Winnipeg, Manitoba; Attendance: 250

=== Gold medal match ===
March 16, 2025; 7:00 p.m. CDT	(3) Manitoba Bisons	3–1	(5) Montréal Carabins	Investors Group Athletic Centre; Winnipeg, Manitoba; Attendance: 3,500
March 16, 2025; 7:00 p.m. CDT	(25–20, 25–19, 24–26, 25–16); Boxscore			Investors Group Athletic Centre; Winnipeg, Manitoba; Attendance: 3,500

== Consolation bracket ==
Semi-Finals: March 15
4	McMaster Marauders	3
8	Memorial Sea-Hawks	0
6	Saint Mary's Huskies	3
7	Saskatchewan Huskies	1

Fifth Place Game: March 16
4	McMaster Marauders	3
6	Saint Mary's Huskies	2

== Awards ==
=== Championship awards ===
- Championship MVP – Raya Surinx, Manitoba

=== Mikasa Players of the Game ===
- Raya Surinx, Manitoba
- Sarah McGlashan, Montréal

=== All-Star Team ===
- Julia Arnold, Manitoba
- Katreena Bentley, Manitoba
- Florence Cloutier, Montreal
- Milica Djordjevic, Montreal
- Raya Surinx, Manitoba
- Allie Moore, Alberta
- Eve Catojo, Manitoba

=== R.W. Pugh Fair Play Award ===
McMaster Marauders
