= Iwaasa =

Iwaasa is a surname. Notable people with the surname include:

- Coby Iwaasa (born 1996), Canadian racquetball player
- Marshal Iwaasa, Canadian man who mysteriously disappeared in 2019
