= Jon Gott =

Canadian football player (born 1985)

No. 63
- Position: Offensive lineman

Personal information
- Born: October 2, 1985 (age 41); Edmonton, Alberta, Canada
- Listed height: 6 ft 3 in (1.91 m)
- Listed weight: 294 lb (133 kg)

Career information
- High school: Lethbridge Collegiate
- College: Boise State
- CFL draft: 2008: 5th round, 35th overall pick

Career history
- 2009–2013: Calgary Stampeders
- 2014–2018: Ottawa Redblacks

Awards and highlights
- Grey Cup champion (2016); Leo Dandurand Trophy (2016); 2× CFL All-Star (2015, 2016); 2× CFL East All-Star (2015, 2016)
- Stats at CFL.ca

Jon Gott (born October 2, 1985) is a Canadian former professional football offensive lineman. He was drafted by the Calgary Stampeders in the fifth round of the 2008 CFL draft. He played five seasons for the Stampeders before being traded to the RedBlacks for the rights to Marwan Hage and the first overall pick in the 2014 CFL draft. He played college football for the Boise State Broncos. In 2024 Jon won his work fantasy football league.

In the Redblacks' 2018 regular season finale against the Toronto Argonauts, Gott chugged a beer in the endzone as a touchdown celebration. Video of the celebration was widely circulated within Canadian and American social media. Gott did not face any disciplinary action from the league, though the league did later change the on-field celebration rules to prohibit using or mimicking alcohol or drugs.
