= Winston Churchill High School (Lethbridge, Alberta) =

Location
- 1605 15th Avenue North; Winston Churchill, Lethbridge, Alberta, T1H 1W4; Canada; 49°43′08″N 112°49′04″W

Information
- School type: Secondary
- Founded: 1961
- School board: Lethbridge School District No. 51
- Principal: Tracy Wong
- Grades: 9–12
- Enrollment: 925 ▲ (2022–2023)
- Campus: Urban
- Colours: Blue and Orange
- Team name: Bulldogs (♂), Griffins (♀)
- Feeder schools: Wilson, Gilbert Paterson, Lethbridge Christian
- Website: wchs.lethsd.ab.ca

Winston Churchill High School (most commonly known as Churchill; also Winston or WCHS) is one of three public secondary schools in Lethbridge, Alberta, Canada, serving grades nine, ten, eleven, and twelve. Entry is loosely based on location in north Lethbridge. The school is in the Winston Churchill neighborhood.

Beginning in the 2003–2004 school year, Grade 9 students began attending the school, in accordance with a nearly province-wide grade reconfiguration that saw "middle" school become grades 6–8, and "high school" redefined as grades 9–12. The school offers several specialty programs, including the internationally recognized International Baccalaureate program.

== International Baccalaureate ==
The International Baccalaureate program is locally similar to the Advanced Placement Program, which is offered at L.C.I. Courses offered include Social Studies, Mathematics, French, Spanish, Biology, Chemistry, and Music.

== Overview ==
=== Athletics ===
The following sports are inter-scholastic at W.C.H.S.:

- Cross country running
- Curling
- Athletics
- Football
- Baseball
- Basketball
- Golf
- Rugby union

== Curricular programs ==
- National Honor Society
- Fine Arts Program (Art, band, drama, choir)
- English as an additional language
- Second Languages (French and French IB, Japanese, German, Spanish and Spanish IB)
- Career & Technology Studies (CTS):
  - Keyboarding
  - Financial Studies
  - Legal Studies
  - Food Studies
  - Fashion Studies
  - Drafting (CAD)
  - Woodworking (Construction Technologies)
  - Computer Programming
  - Robotics

== Notable alumni ==
- Jason Zuback, six-time world long drive champion
- Loudia Laarman, sprinter
- James Steacy, two-time Olympian in hammer throw
- Dylan Steenbergen, football player
- Kris Versteeg, retired NHL player
- Marshal Iwaasa, man who mysteriously disappeared in 2019
