= Stewart Woodman =

American chef (born 1969)

- Born: 1969 (age 55–56); Bellefonte, Pennsylvania
- Education: Southern Alberta Institute of Technology
- Spouse: Heidi Woodman
- Culinary career
- Cooking style: Modern contemporary Midwestern
- Current restaurant(s): Food Trip Foods Foodtruck, The Theatry
- Previous restaurant(s): Heidi's; Levain; Five Restaurant & Street Lounge
- Award(s) won: Best New Chef 2006 (Food & Wine) Best New Restaurant 2007 (Star Tribune) Best Restaurant Minneapolis 2009 (CityPages) Semifinalist, Best Chef: Midwest, James Beard Foundation, 2009 and 2012

Stewart Woodman (born 1969 in Bellefonte, Pennsylvania) is an American chef. His flagship restaurant, Heidi's, was ranked the best restaurant in Minneapolis. His cooking style is Modern American and French Technique. He was educated at Southern Alberta Institute of Technology in Calgary, Alberta, Canada.

He was born in The United States of America and was raised in Montreal, Quebec. At the age of 20 he moved to Banff, Alberta, where he worked for three and a half years at Banff Springs Hotel as an apprentice cook. Woodman next worked as a sous chef at the 40-year-old William Tell Restaurant in Vancouver, British Columbia.

In 1994, Woodman moved back to the United States and was hired as a line cook for Michael Romano at Union Square Café. One year later he went to work at Lespinasse, located in the St. Regis Hotel to cook under Gray Kunz. He stayed for one and a half years before moving to Le Bernardin in 1997 to work under Eric Ripert, where he stayed two and a half years, working as a sous chef for most of that time. In 1999 he began working for Alain Ducasse, in Paris, Monaco, and finally as the opening sous chef at ADNY-Alain Ducasse at the Essex House. He then moved to a sous chef position at the Jean-Georges Vongerichten restaurant in the Trump Tower. He moved to Minneapolis in 2002, and opened Levain, followed by Five Restaurant & Street Lounge where he won the title of Best New Chef from Food & Wine Magazine. In 2007 he opened Heidi's Minneapolis with his wife, business partner, and pastry chef Heidi Woodman. Heidi's closed in 2013.

Shortly after opening Heidi's based on a comment in a review he launched a food based blog called Shefzilla: A Food Blog. In 2010 he published Shefzilla: Conquering Haute Cuisine At Home.

== Artist in residence ==
Woodman was an artist in residence at the Minneapolis Sabes Jewish Community Center in 2011.

== Bibliography ==
- Shefzilla: Conquering Haute Cuisine at Home (2010) ISBN 978-0-87351-809-3
