= Claude Lefebvre (ice hockey) =

Canadian ice hockey player and coach

- Born: February 20, 1964 (age 61); Quebec City, Quebec, Canada
- Height: 5 ft 6 in (168 cm)
- Weight: 172 lb (78 kg; 12 st 4 lb)
- Position: Asst. Coach
- QMJHL team: Quebec Remparts
- NHL draft: Undrafted
- Playing career: 1986–1993

Claude Lefebvre (born February 20, 1964) is a Canadian former ice hockey player who is currently an assistant coach for the Quebec Remparts in the QMJHL.

== Awards and honours ==
Award	Year
Clare Drake Award - CIS Rookie of the year	1985–86
