= Saskatchewan Huskies women's volleyball =

- Founded: 1949
- University: University of Saskatchewan
- Head coach: Mark Dodds (since 2015-16)
- Conference: Canada West
- Location: Saskatoon, Saskatchewan, Canada
- Home arena: Physical Activity Complex
- Nickname: Huskies
- Colors: Green and White

U Sports championships
- 1978-79, 1979-80, 1980-81

Canada West championships
- 1949-50, 1950-51, 1951-52, 1954-55, 1955-56, 1956-57, 1974-75, 1978-79, 1979-80, 1980-81, 1983-84, 1990-91, 1991-92

The Saskatchewan Huskies women's volleyball team represents the University of Saskatchewan in the Canada West Universities Athletic Association conference of U Sports women's volleyball. Founded in 1949, the Huskies have won three national championships and 13 conference titles. The team plays its home games at the Physical Activity Complex (PAC).

== History ==
The Huskies won the inaugural championship in the Western Canadian Intercollegiate Athletic Union (WCIAU), and went on to win three times in succession in the 1949–50, 1950–51, and 1951–52 seasons. Having won the title six times during the WCIAU era, the Huskies won their first regional conference title in the Canada West era in the 1974–75 season and most recently in the 1991–92 season. The Huskies won their first three national titles in succession during the 1978–79, 1980–81, and 1981–82 seasons. The Huskies were the first team across all sports in Canadian Interuniversity Athletic Union to win three successive championships.

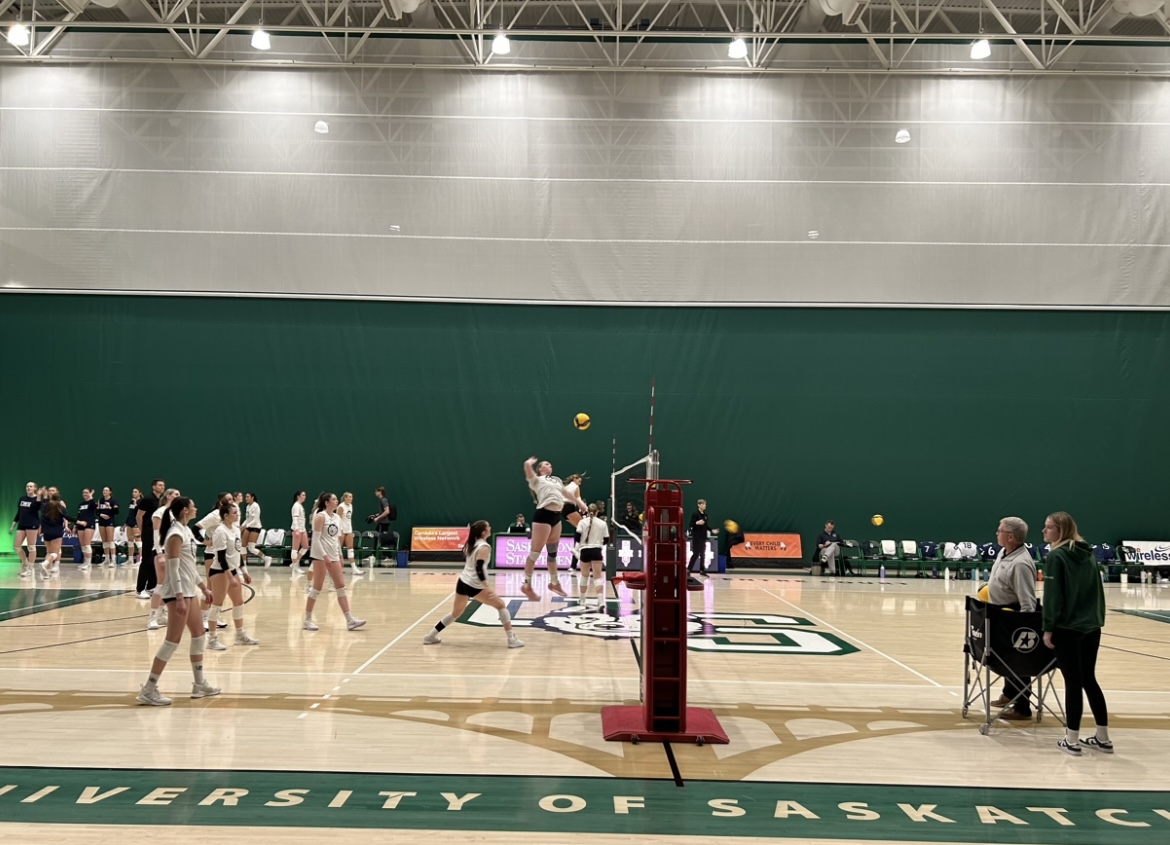
The team warming up before a Canada West game at the PAC in 2026

Sylvia Fedoruk played for the team in the early 1950s and was later inducted into the Huskies and Canada West Halls of Fame.

Mark Tennant, head coach of the huskies from 1972 to 1989 and 1990–97, won the national Coach of the Year award on four occasions and has been honoured by having the U Sports national Rookie of the Year award named after him.

In 2015, Mark Dodds, a former Canadian Interuniversity Sport MVP, Huskies men's volleyball alumnus, and Canadian national team player, was appointed as head coach, saying “I love challenges, and coming in here not really having a lot of experience with the women’s game, I took the challenge on and it’s been exciting. It’s been fun".

After an extended failure to qualify for the Canada West playoffs following the 2001–02 season, the Huskies again qualified in the 2019–20 season.

Going into the 2024–25 season, the Huskies were ranked 11th in the Canada West pre-season coaches poll, with head coach Mark Dodds saying of the team and their prospects “We’re a young team and trying to figure out what our identity is going to be, and how we’re going to play this year. Some ups and downs in the pre-season, but a lot of learning.” In the Canada West bronze medal match in 2025, the Huskies lost by 1 set to 3. After a 24-year absence, the Saskatchewan Huskies qualified for the national championship playoffs in the 2024-25 season, in which they lost in the first stage by 1 sets to 3 against the UBC Thunderbirds on March 14, 2025. This was followed up by a 1–3 loss against the Saint Mary's Huskies in the consolation semifinal. They had entered the tournament as the 7th seed.

At the beginning of the 2025–26 season, the Huskies were ranked 16th out of the 43 teams competing in U Sports women's basketball overall, and were rated as 16th out of 24 in media voting. The Huskies qualified for the Canada West playoff quarterfinal round that season on February 12, 2026, following a 3–1 win over the Regina Cougars. The Huskies lost the series 2–0 against the Trinity Western Spartans.

Head Coaches
Coach	Years	Win-loss (conference)	Win-loss (CW playoffs)	Win-loss (national championship)
Mark Tennant	1972-89			
Laurie Baber	1989-90	11-9		
Mark Tennant	1990-97			
Leslie Irie	1997-2009			
Austin Dyer	2009-10	3-17		
Leslie Irie	2010-11	1-16		
Jason Grieve	2011-15	17-71		
Mark Dodds	2015-	92-112	6-8	0-2

== International ==
- Averie Allard (2017–23): Canada

== Awards and honours ==
=== National ===
- Mark Tennant - Coach of the Year (1978–79, 1979–80, 1983–84, 1990–91)
- Leslie Irie - Coach of the Year (1998–99)
- Stephanie Wheeler - Rookie of the Year (2001–02)
- Melanie Sanford - Championship MVP (1978–79)
- Gisele Rongve - Championship MVP (1980–81)

=== Canada West ===
- Mark Tennant - Coach of the Year (1979–80, 1983–84, 1986–87, 1990–91)
- Laurie Baber - Coach of the Year (1989–90)
- Leslie Irie - Coach of the Year (1998–99, 2001–02)
- Crystal Torgunrud - Player of the Year
- Kerry Bailey - Rookie of the Year
- Chelsea Grimson - Rookie of the Year (1997–98)
- Stephanie Wheeler - Rookie of the Year (2001–02)
