= Tanner McLachlan =

Canadian gridiron football player (born 1999)

Rhode Island Breakers
- Position: Tight end
- Roster status: Unsigned draft pick

Personal information
- Born: March 15, 1999 (age 27); Lethbridge, Alberta, Canada
- Listed height: 6 ft 5 in (1.96 m)
- Listed weight: 244 lb (111 kg)

Career information
- High school: Lethbridge Collegiate Institute (Lethbridge, Alberta)
- College: Southern Utah (2018–2021); Arizona (2022–2023)
- NFL draft: 2024: 6th round, 194th overall pick
- CFL draft: 2024: 6th round, 51st overall pick

Career history
- Cincinnati Bengals (2024); Los Angeles Chargers (2025)*; San Francisco 49ers (2026)*; Rhode Island Breakers (2027-present)
- * Offseason or practice squad member only
- Stats at Pro Football Reference

Tanner McLachlan (born March 15, 1999) is a Canadian professional football tight end. He played college football for the Southern Utah Thunderbirds and Arizona Wildcats.

== Early life ==
McLachlan attended Lethbridge Collegiate Institute in Lethbridge, Alberta, Canada.

== College career ==
McLachlan played wide receiver and tight end at Southern Utah University from 2018 to 2021 and totaled 15 receptions for 168 yards. In 2022, he transferred to the University of Arizona as a walk-on. In his first year at Arizona in 2022, McLachlan started seven of 12 games and had 34 receptions for 456 yards and two touchdowns. As a senior in 2023, he recorded 45 catches for 528 yards and four touchdowns. He finished his career with 79 receptions which broke Rob Gronkowski's school record for career receptions by a tight end, 984 yards and six touchdowns.

== Professional career ==
Pre-draft measurables
Height	Weight	Arm length	Hand span	Wingspan	40-yard dash	10-yard split	20-yard split	20-yard shuttle	Three-cone drill	Vertical jump	Broad jump	Bench press
6 ft 5 1/8 in (1.96 m)	244 lb (111 kg)	31 5/8 in (0.80 m)	9 3/8 in (0.24 m)	6 ft 5 1/4 in (1.96 m)	4.61 s	1.58 s	2.69 s	4.58 s	7.38 s	35.0 in (0.89 m)	9 ft 10 in (3.00 m)	20 reps
All values from NFL Combine/Pro Day

=== Cincinnati Bengals ===
McLachlan was selected 194th overall in the sixth round of the 2024 NFL draft by the Cincinnati Bengals. McLachlan was also the third highest rated prospect ahead of the 2024 CFL draft where he was selected 51st overall in the sixth round by the Calgary Stampeders.

On August 26, 2025, McLachlan was waived by the Bengals with an injury designation as part of final roster cuts.

=== Los Angeles Chargers ===
On December 11, 2025, McLachlan was signed to the Los Angeles Chargers' practice squad. He spent time on and off the Chargers practice squad before signing a reserve/future contract with Los Angeles on January 13, 2026. On May 12, McLachlan was waived by the Chargers.

=== San Francisco 49ers ===
On July 25, 2026, McLachlan signed a one-year contract with the San Francisco 49ers. On July 31, McLachlan was waived by the 49ers with an injury designation and reverted to injured reserve the next day. On August 24, McLachlan was waived from injured reserve with an injury settlement.
