= Lethbridge Collegiate Institute =

Location
- 1701 5 Avenue South; Lethbridge, Alberta, T1J 0W4; Canada; 49°41′38″N 112°49′01″W

Information
- School type: High school
- Motto: Pro Scola et Pro Patria (For School and For Country)
- Founded: 1928
- School board: Lethbridge School District No. 51
- Principal: Wayne Pallett
- Staff: 77 (2019)
- Grades: 9–12
- Enrollment: 881 ▲ (2019-20)
  - Grade 9: 217
  - Grade 10: 234
  - Grade 11: 199
  - Grade 12: 231
- Campus: Suburban
- Area: 11 acres (4.5 ha)
- Colours: Green and gold
- Team name: Rams, Clippers, Samurais
- Feeder schools: Gilbert Paterson Middle School; Wilson Middle School
- Website: lci.lethsd.ab.ca

Lethbridge Collegiate Institute (LCI) is a public high school in Lethbridge, Alberta, Canada, operated by Lethbridge School District No. 51 that serves grades nine through twelve. LCI was the first school in Lethbridge designated only for secondary students. It opened at its current location in 1950, but was founded in a smaller, adjacent building in 1928. Since its 1950 opening, several additions and layout changes have been made at the school. In August 2010, Chinook High School opened in West Lethbridge with over 700 students enrolled. Those that entered grade 11 in 2009 at LCI were permitted to complete their graduating year at LCI, but west Lethbridge students are now encouraged to attend the new high school, which was being built in conjunction with a western campus of Catholic Central High School, recreational facilities, and a public library.

As a result of Chinook's opening, LCI's enrollment decreased by a substantial 35% for the 2010–2011 school year and a further 11% to only 870 in 2011-2012; less than both Chinook and north Lethbridge's Winston Churchill High.

A relatively extensive academic program is offered, including automotives, construction and communication technology, fashion studies, and four language studies programs. An Advanced Placement Program is offered in several key subject areas, including mathematics, language arts, and the sciences. Respected instrumental music, choir, and dance programs have helped LCI become well known in Southern Alberta for offering balanced opportunities to students in both academics and extracurricular activities. Athletic teams from LCI carry the names Rams, Clippers, Colts, and Schooners, although the latter two have fallen into disuse.

== History ==
=== Early years ===
In the early 1900s, two schools near downtown Lethbridge were named with reference to their location. Built in 1891, fifteen years prior to the incorporation of the City of Lethbridge, the first was Central School. The small school was the only one that served secondary students in the Lethbridge area. In 1909, Central School closed and secondary education classes moved into a vacated building on 5 Avenue. The school became too crowded in the mid-1920s, and a struggle began between the school board and the city to have a new school constructed.

In February 1928, construction work began on Lethbridge Collegiate Institute at the corner of 4 Avenue and 15 Street South. The institution would become the city's first combined junior high and high school. The site had previously been used for aviation activities in the city, until the opening of Kenyon Field (now Lethbridge County Airport) south of Six-Mile Coulee in the summer of 1939. Construction of the school at the site finished in October 1928, but a fire in the spring of 1929 ravaged the new building. Classes had to be moved to other local schools until later that year. When LCI became too small for the city's growing population in 1950, a new building was constructed on the same block just east of the old one. Due to southern Alberta's booming population, twenty-one schools were constructed in Lethbridge between 1946 and 1965. Grades 10–12 were moved to the new building while grades 7–9 remained at their present location. The new junior high was renamed Lethbridge Junior High School, but kept the name for less than a year. In the latter part of 1950, the junior high adopted its new name, Hamilton Junior High School (named after a former teacher, principal, and superintendent, William Alfred Hamilton). The school kept the name for over half a century until its relocation to the rapidly expanding area of West Lethbridge as G.S. Lakie Middle School in 2003.

Next door, classes commenced on November 22, 1950 at the new LCI. With increases in student population, new sections of the building were added in 1955, 1957, 1970, and 1986. A section of Hamilton's old building was used to house Allan Watson High School for a time That high school was not operated by District 51. At that time the building was being renovated to house the headquarters of Lethbridge School District 51. Allan Watson was later replaced by Victoria Park High School operated by the District.

=== A new grade ===
In accordance with a grade reconfiguration in many public schools across Alberta, Grade 9 students began attending the school in the fall of 2003. Teachers, textbooks, and other classroom materials were brought in from local middle schools. The changes introduced a new term to the area: "middle school". With the middle school enrolling students for grades 6–8, the term "high school" was redefined to include grades 9–12. The changes created minor inconveniences for staff and other areas of the school. At LCI, it brought more students into a building already near capacity.

Community members believed the restructuring by the government was targeted specifically at the City of Lethbridge, a move made to force the province to build an additional Lethbridge high school. Such a project had been anticipated for at least a decade. As expected, the announcement for the new school came in 2005. Enrollment at LCI exceeded 1,600 students. In an effort to reduce numbers, students living on the City's north side who attend LCI must be enrolled in a course not offered at Winston Churchill High School.

LCI's enrollment peaked in 2005. The population of the city has steadily increased. The graduating class of 2007 was the first to complete all four years of learning at the school since its founding. The convocation in May, with the day's ceremonies at the ENMAX Centre, was centred around the a theme noting the historical fact that it was the first class to spend all four years of their secondary education at LCl.

=== December 2007 shooting scare ===
On December 13, 2007, a note was found handwritten in a washroom stall. Its exact words were undisclosed, but school officials described it as "a student's intention to shoot others, as well as possibly taking their own life, on December 20." A district official responded, "at this point in time we're not planning to install metal detectors. We feel that we're taking the precautions by having a police presence." Extra staff members and local police officers patrolled the school's hallways for the week of December 17–21. Only days earlier, the words "December 18, 2007 Massacre" were found in a washroom at Paul Kane High School in St. Albert, Alberta. Officials at that school said "extraordinary security measures" were to be taken, but it was believed to be a hoax. It is unknown if the LCI incident was simply a copycat of the Paul Kane incident, but school officials in both cities requested that the perpetrators step forward; neither has done so. Both schools also made counseling staff available for any students who felt apprehensive about their safety. Though attendance was down significantly at Paul Kane on December 18 and only 300 students attended LCI on December 20, regular classes proceeded without incident.

On December 20, a similar note was found in a bathroom at W. R. Myers High School in nearby Taber, Alberta, indicating a student's intent to do harm on December 21. With a student attendance of roughly 20%, classes proceeded without incident. In 1999, a student opened fire at W. R. Myers, killing one student and seriously wounding another. In 2000, LCI was locked down after two youths were arrested and two firearms were seized.

=== Principal bullying accusations ===
In the month of December, 2019, current and/or former teachers launch bullying accusations to current principal, Wayne Pallett. Teachers reported that Pallett was abusive. One unidentified teacher states "I've never had anybody look as if they're going to hit me because they look so angry, and red-faced and mouth contorted." "I have witnessed staff members of all levels crying or angry because of him and that's from teachers to support staff, to even saw him make a vice principal cry before," another former employee said. "Not sleeping, I didn't want to eat, like I couldn't, I had to force myself to eat. I lost almost 20 pounds and [was] having panic attacks," she said. When local news network, CBC, asked Pallett for a comment, Pallett denied.

== Campus ==
Stained glass above an entrance

LCI is a maze of hallways that is split into different wings where various subjects are taught. The school building is land-locked and bounded by surrounding buildings. Victoria Park High School resides to the west of LCI in the east part of the former Hamilton Junior High building. Businesses are to the north of the school. A church and residential homes are across the street to the south of the LCI building. The Catholic Central High School is across the street to the east.

The current layout has the campus divided into sections, seven of which are in the main building. The "A" wing, with the cafeteria, music rooms, and a small, secondary gymnasium, is the westernmost portion of the building. The "B" wing, a newer component of the building, contains mostly the English and Mathematics departments. The bottom floor of the large, southern "C" wing holds the library and two lecture theatres. The upper floors contain computer, biology, chemistry, and physics laboratories as well as several classrooms. The main "D" wing contains administrator offices, science, and social studies classrooms. The main gym and counselling department technically make up the "E" wing, though it is hardly referred to by that name. Construction technology, automotives, and the LCI Performing Arts Centre north of the main gym are the "F" wing, while a small, third floor section containing home economics is the "H" wing. Underneath the home economics area is a fitness centre housing various exercise equipment. The single-storey, peripheral "G" wing, a linear building separated by a 15-metre lane from the main building, houses a communication technology lab, electronic equipment, autobody, and an art room. The total floor area at LCI exceeds that of all the other schools in the district combined.

A concession booth close to the main gymnasium provides various snacks that can be purchased during the day and at evening sporting events. The cafeteria at the west end of the building sells food for lunch. Students are also free to leave the campus for lunch as several fast food restaurants are within walking distance. In another effort to reduce congestion, LCI lunch period is almost entirely offset from that of nearby Catholic Central High School. The school also has problems with internal overcrowding. Hundreds of students are bussed from the city's west side daily.

A lane north of the school is restricted to buses only. Students traverse the staff parking lot in the morning and afternoon to reach 13 busses, the majority of which carry students to and from West Lethbridge. Although a parking lot for staff with over 100 parking spaces is provided, no parking is officially designated for students. Competing with students from the other two area high schools also trying to park their vehicles, Lethbridge students must park their vehicles on 5 Avenue, or south on 17 Street or 18 Street.

Packed on two city blocks with five other schools, the surrounding narrow streets are difficult to navigate for parents and students with cars during the morning and afternoon rush.

== Academics ==
From Monday to Thursday, the school operates from 7:55 in the morning to 2:45 in the afternoon with 77 minute classes. Grade ten, eleven and twelve students have four different modules with one doubled on each day of the week (e.g. module 3 is doubled on Wednesday). On Fridays, classes begin slightly later, running from 7:55 to 12:38 with four 62 minute classes and no lunch period. From Monday to Thursday, the lunch period begins at 11:49. The peculiar times are partly due to the district's school busses, which are also needed for elementary and middle schools which have later start and end times.

In preparation for Provincial Achievement Tests (PATs) at the end of the year, grade nine students operate on a similar system to that of the local middle schools. All courses run from September until June with the exception of option courses which are semestered. This is contrary to grades ten through twelve, where nearly all classes are semester long and students receive 5 credits per course. 100 credits are needed to graduate, per Alberta Learning requirements. Each credit signifies approximately 125 hours of classroom instruction. Of their final sixteen high school modules (4 in grade eleven and 4 in grade twelve), students are permitted to take three spare modules with a general restriction of one per year in grade eleven and one per semester in grade twelve.

Due to the high enrollment, several teachers have had their classrooms segregated from their main department. In recent years, the teachers were left without classrooms and had to make use of whatever rooms were available during a particular module. As a result, the building is now much less departmentalized than was originally planned.

Numerous scholarships are offered annually for students. For some students, applying for a scholarship is not necessary; grade 11 or 12 students with an overall average above 80% are eligible to receive $400 via Rutherford Scholarships. Entry into the National Honor Society is also offered to them, requiring students to complete a minimum of 10 hours community service over the course of the year. The Society participates in directing annual functions such as "Parent-Teacher Evening". In the community, the group assists at the Chinook Regional Hospital and at Salvation Army functions, such as bell ringing.

LCI students are encouraged to remain within the city for their post-secondary students and attend the University of Lethbridge by representatives from that school. Accordingly, it is easier for local students to be rewarded with scholarships, and several are only available for students who attended high school in Southern Alberta. A high number of students also go on to attend the Universities of Calgary and Alberta, as well as Lethbridge College. In a 2009 Fraser Institute report, which was conducted from the previous school year, LCI was ranked 162nd among Alberta high schools, down significantly from a rank of 102nd in the previous 5 years. More promising is the fact that the number of students dropping out of school before completion has steadily decreased, on average, provincewide. While data is not available for individual institutions, the number of students completing school has also increased districtwide.

=== Advisor Program ===
Similar to a long-running program in place at Winston Churchill High School, an advisor program was introduced in the fall of 2006. The program consists of an 8-minute session between the first two periods during which students of all grades meet with a teacher to whom they were randomly assigned at the beginning of the year. More personal than that of the counselling department, the program offers the opportunity for students to seek advice from an influential adult. Administrative duties, such as public announcements and the handing out of report cards and newsletters, is done in sessions. Advisors also make mid-semester phone-home reports to parents. Most students do not have their advisor as a classroom instructor. In most circumstances, students will have the same advisor for all four years of high school.

=== Student council ===
The Student Council consists of a president, four vice presidents (one elected from each grade), a secretary, a treasurer, a Spirit Coordinator, and an Activity Coordinator. Members of the council perform administrative duties such as the organization of assemblies and school functions. The vice presidential positions are intended to provide student representation with a closer connection to the administration within respective grades, but they have been criticised for being simply symbolic.

The budget designated to the council is low. The activities, for which members through their campaign promises were initially voted to organize, seldom happen. The president, with help from other council members, will normally "emcee" pep rallies geared toward increasing school spirit and promoting the fine arts. Until 2006, elections for all positions were held in late September or early October. Now, elections for all positions (except for the grade nine vice-president) are held in June for the elected to take office in the following year.

=== Advanced Placement Program ===
The Advanced Placement Program (AP) at LCI was a program highly promoted at feeder schools, locally compared to the International Baccalaureate program (IB) offered at Winston Churchill. Advanced Placement classes are no longer offered at the school. In grade 8 classes at middle school, students had to achieve a final average above 80% to enter AP classes in grade 9. The program was intended to give students an opportunity to learn in subjects beyond the basic curriculum. Some graduates of the AP program have stated that the material learned was similar to first-year university courses. The program consists of advanced courses in mathematics, biology, physics, chemistry, English, and social studies.

More extracurricular activities and "more peaceful" classrooms are among the praises for the program. However, for the majority of the courses, little to no extra work is completed in the advanced stream versus the regular courses. Unlike the IB program, Alberta Learning states that students may not switch between the lowest streams and Advanced Placement in grades 11 and 12; but they can switch between the various streams in grades 9 and 10. Both AP and IB programs are presented based on their different strengths and weaknesses, and students are encouraged to select their high school based on other factors such as their location in Lethbridge. Annually, LCI students take provincial advanced placement exams in various subjects, including World History, literature and physics, in grade 12.

== Extracurricular activities ==
LCI Athletic Provincial Championships (since 2000)
Year	Sport	Division
2001/02	Golf	3A/4A Boys Team
2003/04	Golf	Boys Individual
2003/04	Golf	Girls Individual
2004/05	Golf	3A/4A Boys Team
2005/06	Wrestling (Rural)	Boys 90 and 108 kg
2006/07	Wrestling (Rural)	Boys 4A Team
2006/07	Wrestling (Rural)	Girls 4A Team
2006/07	Wrestling (Rural)	Boys 50, 59 and 72 kg
2006/07	Wrestling (Rural)	Girls 57 kg
2006/07	Rugby	Tier I Girls
2007/08	Volleyball	4A Boys
2007/08	Wrestling (Rural)	Boys 4A Team
2007/08	Wrestling (Rural)	Girls 4A Team
2007/08	Wrestling (Rural)	Boys 90 and 120 kg
2007/08	Wrestling (Rural)	Girls 57 kg
2007/08	Rugby	Tier I Girls
2008/09	Wrestling (Rural)	Boys 4A Team
2008/09	Wrestling (Rural)	Girls 4A Team
2009/10	Wrestling (Provincial)	Boys 120 kg
2009/10	Wrestling (Rural)	Boys 62 and 120 kg
2012/13	Rugby	Tier I Boys

The main gymnasium has a large "Wall of Champions" along the east and south wall, timelining provincial athletic victories since the move to the new building. Several hallways are lined with framed photographs of past LCI athletic teams, choirs, and councils that date back to the early 1980s. The "L.C.I. Wall of Distinction" profiles dozens of notable graduates. Two or three members are inducted each year in a prominent school assembly, usually with the inductees, as well as the city's mayor, in attendance.

=== Athletics ===
==== Football ====
LCI has an active Canadian football program that regularly produces future Canadian Football League as well as Division I players in the United States. The latest is Jon Gott, a 2004 graduate who went on to Boise State University. In 2008, the LCI football team did an exchange with Crestwood High School in Peterborough, Ontario.

==== Other sports ====
With several members winning various awards at provincial competitions, the 2006–07 year was promising for the LCI wrestling team. Elsewhere, a former LCI student and rugby union player, Ashley Patzer, was named CIS player of the year for 2006. She was also later named the University of Lethbridge Female Athlete of the Year. As of 2007, track and field, baseball, basketball, badminton, curling, golf, softball, volleyball, and girls slowpitch are also played at LCI.

==== School song ====
The song is no longer used or promoted at school athletic events, mostly because of the elimination of cheerleading several years ago. Nonetheless, the song is as follows (sung to the tune of "Anchors Aweigh"):

To our dear LCI
We will be true
We'll hold our colours high
Cause LCI we're all for you.
We will fight all the way
To spread your fame
Our banners will not sway
Cause Green and Gold
Will put the rest to shame.
FIGHT! FIGHT! FIGHT!

=== Choir ===
The choral program at LCI is prominent, and is arguably the school's most successful extracurricular program. Choir is provided as an optional course at all grades. Auditions are also held annually for the school's three representative choirs:

- The Chamber Choir is the program's star feature and most well-known group, directed by Karen Hudson. The group consists of around 40 young vocalists of extreme musical talent. The majority of their music is spiritual, but they are also known for adding music from various international languages. Near the end of every school year, the choir, through various fundraising efforts over the course of the year, takes an international trip. At the 2006 MusicFest Canada competition in Ottawa, Ontario, the Chamber and Jazz choirs received gold awards in the choral/vocal jazz division. Past trips include visits to Japan, New York City and Hawaii. As they do every few years, the choir traveled overseas in April 2007, touring and performing in Western Europe. The 08-09 year was a special one, with the group traveling to New York City where they performed in the historic Carnegie Hall, singing repertoire from Mozart's Coronation Mass, as well as traveling to Italy to perform at St. Peter's Basilica under the direction of famed choral composer Z. Randall Stroope. The group has also been successful at various local, provincial, and national music festivals.
- The Jazz Choir, also led by Hudson, consists of 12 students, all of whom are members of the Chamber Choir. They are an a cappella group. Their songs range from ballads to almost rock-style jazz. The choir performs at the aforementioned Christmas and spring concerts as well as various community events throughout the year and occasionally with local artists.
- The LCI Singers consist of girls from grades 9–12, led by Karen Hudson. They perform primarily at school functions such as Remembrance Day and charity venues such as Compassion Canada to help raise money to aid new mothers in Africa. In May 2005, the group traveled to Edmonton and performed for Her Majesty Queen Elizabeth II. LCI Singers usually take one major trip each year, using several concerts throughout the school year as fundraisers. In April 2007 they traveled to England and Wales on a performing tour. In May 2008 they placed first in the Provincial competition for their class. In 2017, the group received second place at the National Music Festival. In April 2009, the LCI Singers went on their second European tour to Austria, Germany and the Czech Republic.

=== Clubs ===
The school has provisions for over 30 clubs. The most prominent of those that are active are 'Students Alive', 'Peer Support', the ‘Gay Straight Alliance’, and 'Travel Club'; the latter of which will travel to Italy in 2019. Also notable is a group called the Association to Kill Apathy (AKA), which does community as well as environmental work. On Remembrance Day of 2006, the group dedicated "peace poles", in association with the Independent Order of Odd Fellows, garnering local media attention. The Collegian Column is a weekly school bulletin produced by faculty, which appeals primarily to older students interested in scholarship information. The LCI Journal, the school newspaper, has not been active for a number of years. Concerning defunct clubs and media, the school leaves it to faculty to decide if a project is to be revived, pending student interest.

=== Other activities ===
LCI has its own small theatre, which had previously been a metal shop. The room has a sound system and some theatrical lighting; it also seats nearly 100 people. There is a fall theatrical production performed entirely by students at the Genevieve E. Yates Memorial Centre, located a few blocks to the west of the school. LCI has won several competitions in the local spring high school one act competition.

LCI is well known for its student exchange programs. The most advertised is the exchange Japan; LCI regularly exchanges students with Sapporo Commercial High School, an institution which has also been informally twinned with LCI in a program implemented by Alberta Education. LCI students made the trip to Japan in early July 2007. In the 2006/07 year, the school also took part in an exchange program with a high school in Spain; several Spanish students arrived in the fall of 2006, and several LCI students departed for Spain in the spring of 2007.

The LCI dance program is rapidly expanding and features numerous styles, including jazz, modern, and hip hop. All programs are under the direction of Georden Olsen. Usually, sometimes several times a semester, professional dancers and choreographers from Calgary are offered residency to work at the school for as long as three weeks. The program's feature event, Summerdance, is held in the spring at the Yates Memorial Centre.

In early April 2007, a group of LCI students travelled to Vimy Ridge with students from Winston Churchill and more than 3,600 students from across Canada. All of the students participate in events dedicated to the ninetieth anniversary of Canadian military victory during World War I.

== Notable alumni ==
- Gavin Crawford, comedian and actor, best known for his role on the CBC comedy show, This Hour Has 22 Minutes
- Jon Gott, CFL player for the Ottawa Redblacks
- Kari Matchett, actress known for two TV series Nero Wolfe Mysteries and Covert Affairs
- Tanner McLachlan, NFL player for the Cincinnati Bengals

== Notes and references ==
Notes

a: Latin text. Directly translates to "for school and for fatherland", or "for school and for country".
b: Sometimes given as "5 Avenue South and 17 Street South"; the school is located on the northwest corner of the intersection.
c: Prior to the 2003 grade reconfiguration, grade nine students were part of what was then called junior high school. The format of provincial achievement testing was not changed to reflect the semsetered format of high schools, so to keep consistency with schools that did not reconfigure, grade nine core classes remained on a year-long system.
d: Results covering all athletic divisions such as those in the source above are not consistently available prior to 2000, though the LCI football program enjoyed provincial success in the early 1990s.
