= 2010 CIS Men's Basketball Championship =

Canadian university basketball championship

The 2010 CIS Men's Final 8 Basketball Tournament was held March 19–21, 2010. It was the last of three consecutive CIS Championships to be held at Scotiabank Place in Ottawa, Ontario and was hosted by the Carleton Ravens. The host Ravens were seeking to win their seventh championship in eight years. The tournament was broadcast on TSN2, which led to controversy over its tape delay of one semi-final and over blocking on-line access to game broadcast.

The University of Saskatchewan Huskies won their first CIS basketball championship, with a 91–81 victory over the University of British Columbia Thunderbirds. The Huskies defeated the number one ranked Carleton Ravens in the semi-final. It was UBC's second consecutive loss in the championship game, after losing to Carleton in the previous year's final.

== Championship Bracket ==
First Round: March 19
1	Carleton Ravens (29-2)	83
8	UQAM Citadins (18-12)	72
4	Windsor Lancers (21-7)	68
5	Saskatchewan Huskies (23-7)	71
2	Cape Breton Capers (28-3)	74
7	Calgary Dinos (21-6)	82
3	UBC Thunderbirds (23-2)	79
6	Lakehead Thunderwolves (23-7)	58

Semi-Finals: March 20
1	Carleton Ravens (30-2)	82
5	Saskatchewan Huskies (24-7)	86
3	UBC Thunderbirds (24-2)	77
7	Calgary Dinos (22-6)	63

Final: March 21
3	UBC Thunderbirds (25-2)	81
5	Saskatchewan Huskies (25-7)	91

== Consolation Bracket ==
Consolation Semi-Finals: March 20
4	Windsor Lancers	79
8	UQAM Citadins	74
2	Cape Breton Capers	87
6	Lakehead Thunderwolves	65

Consolation Final: March 21
2	Cape Breton Capers	95
4	Windsor Lancers	92

Note: All records are against CIS competition only.

== Game Reports ==
- Calgary 82-74 Cape Breton
- UBC 79-58 Lakehead
- Saskatchewan 71-68 Windsor
- Carleton 83-72 UQAM
- Cape Breton 87-65 Lakehead
- Windsor 79-74 UQAM
- UBC 77-63 Calgary
- Saskatchewan 86-82 Carleton
- Saskatchewan 91-81 UBC
