= Southern Alberta Institute of Technology =

University in Calgary, Canada

Coordinates: 51°03′43″N 114°05′29″W

Southern Alberta Institute of Technology (SAIT)
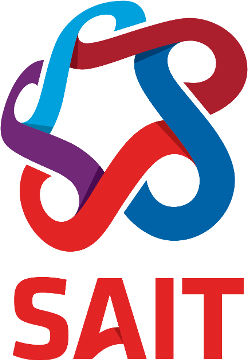
- Motto: Incipio Et Erudio
- Motto in English: I Take In Hand And Educate
- Type: Public
- Established: 1916; 110 years ago
- Academic affiliations: CICan, AACTI, CBIE, CUP, Polytechnics Canada
- President: David Ross
- Faculty: 1,269
- Administrative staff: 1,054
- Students: 18,402 (2023-24 fulltime equivalent)
- Other students: 3,955 apprenticeships, 20,822 corporate training, continuing education, camps and other courses, 2,001 Open Studies and upgrading programs
- Location: Calgary, Alberta, Canada
- Colours: Red & white (athletics); Red, white, blue (institute)
- Nickname: Trojans
- Sporting affiliations: CCAA, Alberta Colleges Athletics Conference
- Website: www.sait.ca

The Southern Alberta Institute of Technology (SAIT) is a polytechnic institute in Calgary, Alberta, Canada. SAIT offers more than 110 career programs in technology, trades and business. Established in 1916, it is Calgary's second oldest post-secondary institution and Canada's first publicly funded technical institute.

== Campus location and expansion ==
SAIT's main campus is on 16 Avenue NW, overlooking the downtown core of Calgary and is served by the CTrain light rail system. SAIT has three other campuses in Calgary:

- Mayland Heights – Located on Centre Avenue, this facility supports students pursuing a career in auto body, crane and hoisting, recreation vehicle servicing, electrical, plumbing and rail.
- Culinary Campus – Located on Stephen Avenue, it provides baking basics and cooking fundamentals. The Culinary Campus also acts as a marketplace, selling food to the general public.
- Art Smith Aero Centre – Occupying 69,000 square metres (17 acres) of land at the Calgary International Airport, this campus supports the School of Transportation.
- Crane and Ironworker Facility – Located at 10490 72 St SE, this 2,812 m^{2} (30,270 sq ft) facility has a fully functioning crane maintenance shop, a yard with boom trucks and mobile cranes and crane simulators.
- The Tastemarket by SAIT – Located at 444 7 Ave SW, The Tastemarket is a downtown urban eatery and learning environment.
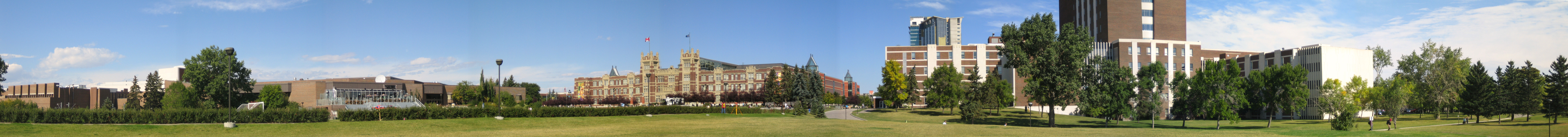
SAIT campus viewed from the south field. Senator Patrick Burns building on the right, Heritage Hall centre, and Campus Centre left.

== Academics ==
SAIT offers three baccalaureate degrees (2019), six applied degrees, 86 diploma and certificate programs, 27 apprenticeship trades and more than 1,100 continuing education, corporate training, camps and other open registration courses. SAIT delivers skill-oriented education through nine schools:

- MacPhail School of Energy
- School of Business
- School of Construction
- School of Health and Public Safety
- School of Hospitality and Tourism
- School of Manufacturing and Automation
- School of Transportation
- School for Advanced Digital Technology

English language foundations and academic upgrading are offered through the Lamb Learner Success Centre. SAIT's Applied Research and Innovation Services (ARIS) department works in partnership with industry on applied research.

== Facilities ==
=== Heritage Hall ===
Heritage Hall
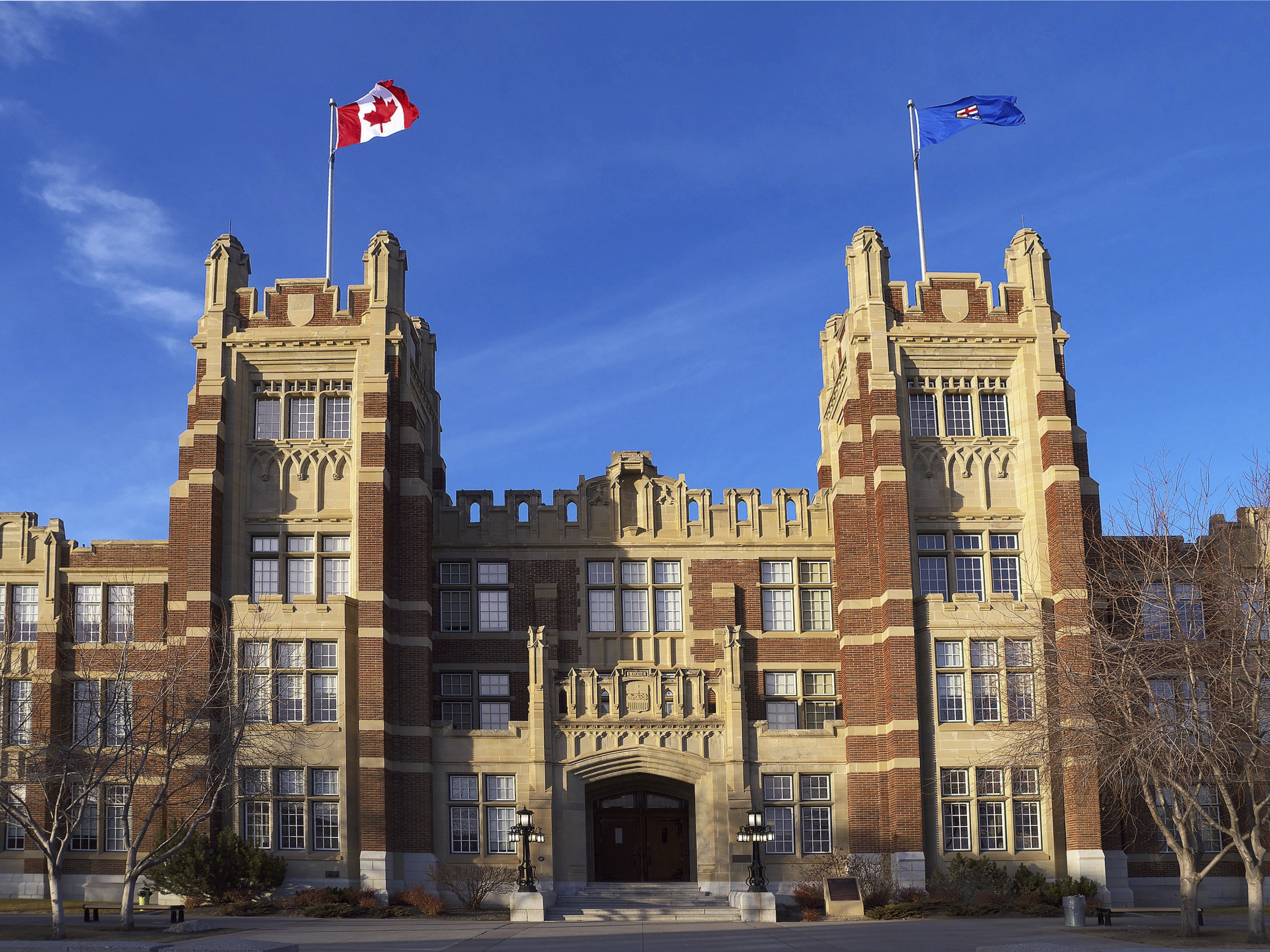
- Former names: Heart Building
- Alternative names: Heritage Hall - Southern Alberta Institute of Technology National Historic Site of Canada

General information
- Status: Used as a post-secondary educational building
- Type: Educational building
- Architectural style: Collegiate Gothic style
- Location: 1301 16th Avenue North West, Calgary, Alberta, Canada
- Current tenants: Southern Alberta Institute of Technology
- Construction started: January 18, 1921
- Completed: 1922
- Cost: CA$174,200 (equivalent to $2,860,364 in 2025)

Dimensions
- Other dimensions: 340 feet (100 m) across x 90 feet (27 m) deep

Design and construction
- Architect: Richard P. Blakey
- Main contractor: J. McDiarmid Company

National Historic Site of Canada
- Official name: Heritage Hall - Southern Alberta Institute of Technology National Historic Site of Canada
- Designated: June 24, 1987

Alberta Historic Resources Act
- Official name: Heritage Hall of the Southern Alberta Institute of Technology
- Designated: May 31, 1985

Heritage Hall is one of the central buildings and a historical site on the SAIT campus.

Construction began on Heritage Hall on January 18, 1921, five years after the Provincial Institute of Technology and Art (PITA) was formed in Calgary in 1916. Designed by Alberta provincial architect Richard Palin Blakey and built by J. McDiarmid Company of Winnipeg, the three-storey modern structure's focal point is the central entrance flanked by two large towers designed with the characteristics of Collegiate Gothic architecture, which was prevalent throughout North America at the time. Despite the prevalence of Collegiate Gothic architecture in post-secondary education, Heritage Hall is the only example in Calgary. Heritage Hall was completed later in 1922 and accommodated both the PITA and the Calgary Normal School. During the Second World War, the structure was used as a wireless training school for the British Commonwealth Air Training Plan. The structure was intentionally situated on Calgary's North Hill to maximize the structure's visibility throughout Calgary, and also provide a view of the city from the building. The building was originally known as the "Provincial Institute of Technology Building and Normal School" and was renamed "Heritage Hall" in 1985.

On May 31, 1985, the Government of Alberta designated Heritage Hall a provincial historic resource under the Historical Resources Act. The citation for the historical designation notes the integral role the structure and SAIT played in the development of post-secondary education in Alberta, and the significant architectural value of the Collegiate Gothic design.

On June 24, 1987, the Government of Canada designated Heritage Hall a national historic site under the name "Heritage Hall – Southern Alberta Institute of Technology National Historic Site of Canada". The federal designation notes the importance of the structure and SAIT as a place in the development of vocational education in Western Canada. The designation references only the footprint of Heritage Hall and not the entire SAIT campus.

=== Residence ===
SAIT Residence has two modern high rises in the northeast corner of its main campus. The residence buildings provide visitors with access to amenities during their stay including on-site laundry, 24-hour security, utilities, and shared lounge space.

=== Campus Centre ===
The Campus Centre contained a coffee house, bar, Jugo Juice, gymnasium, fitness centre, squash courts, bowling alley, hockey arena, salt water pool and theatre.

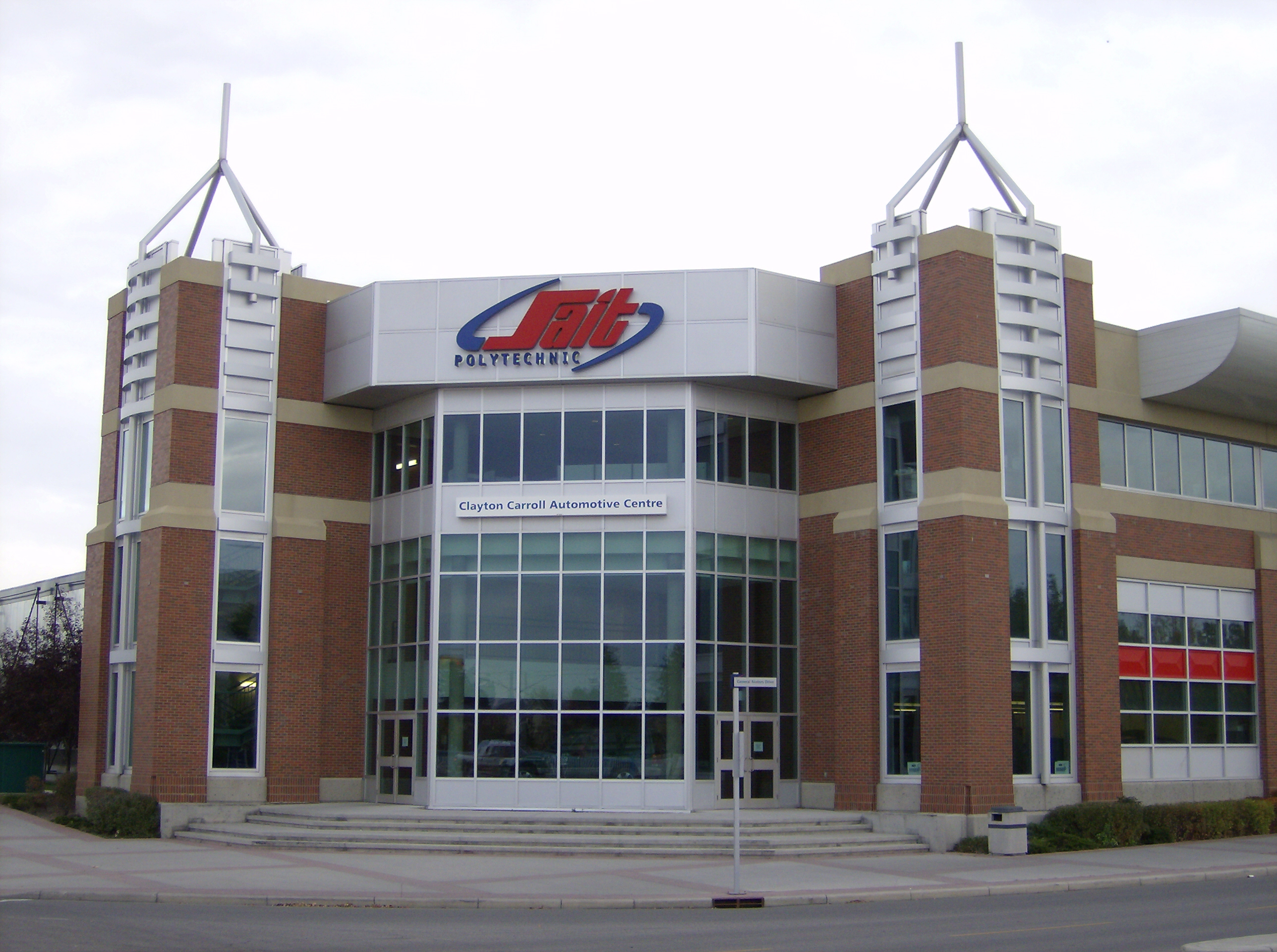
Clayton Carroll Automotive Centre at SAIT

This building has been decommissioned, and demolition is currently in progress. Construction of a new Campus Centre is expected to be complete by 2025.

=== Stan Grad Centre ===
This central building on SAIT's main campus houses food service outlets, study areas, classrooms, the campus bookstore and the library.

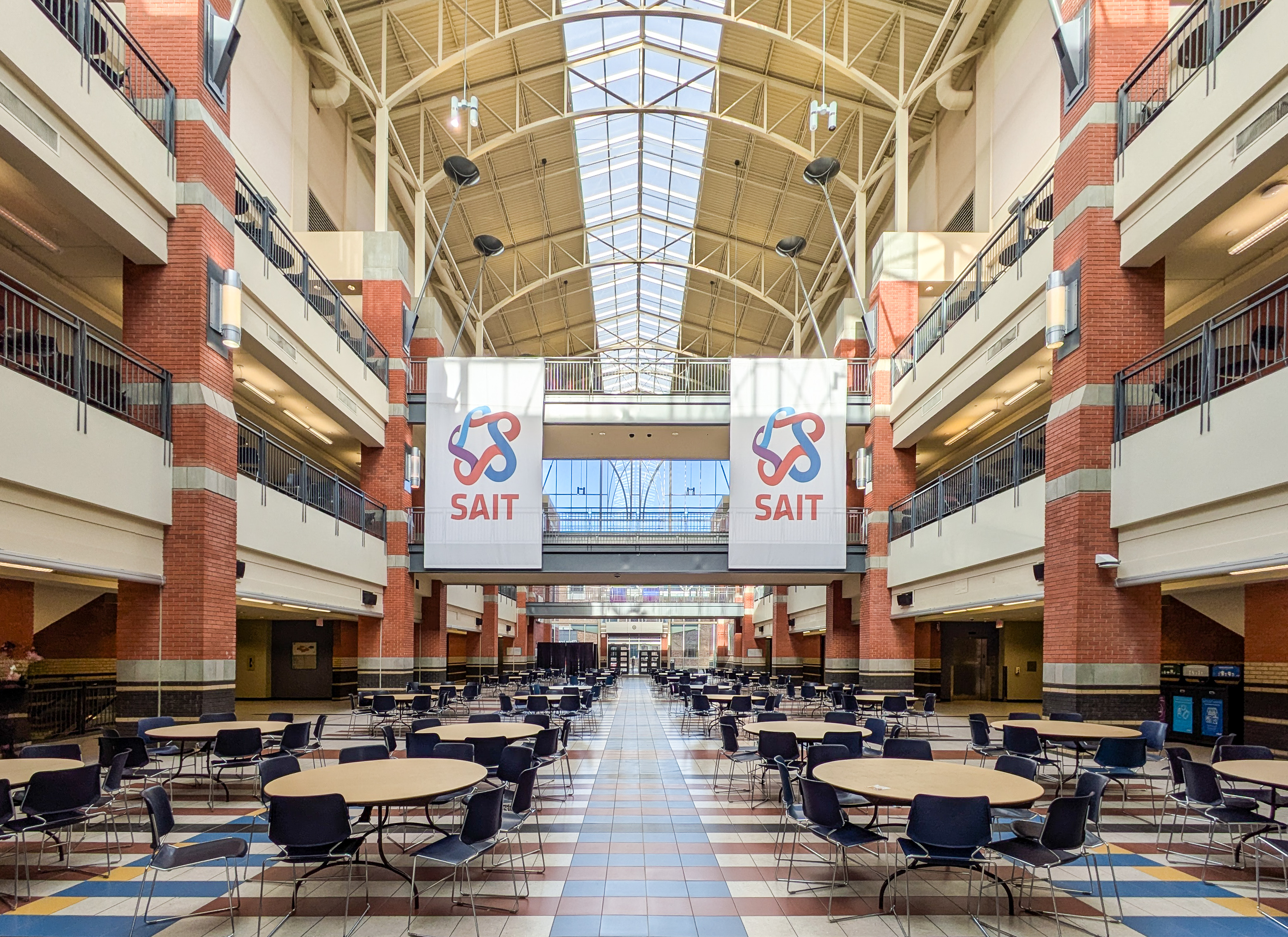
Interior photo of the SAIT Stan Grad Centre main hall

=== Additional buildings on campus ===
- Clayton Carroll Automotive Centre
- Aldred Centre
- John Ware building
- E.H. Crandell building
- Cenovus Energy Centre
- Johnson-Cobbe Energy Centre
- Senator Burns building
- Eugene Coste building
- Thomas Riley building

== Athletics ==
SAIT has been a member of the Alberta Colleges Athletic Conference since 1964. The SAIT Trojans are represented in basketball, curling, soccer, cross-country running, hockey, and volleyball. All of SAIT's sports teams share the name Trojans.

SAIT Trojans also have ESPORTS teams that compete in the NACE league, for League of Legends, Valorant, Overwatch, Marvel Rivals, Rocket League, and Super Smash Brothers.

== Recognition ==
In 2023, SAIT moved from sixth to fourth place among Canada's top five research colleges, according to the ranking.

== Notable alumni ==
- Robert Alford, politician
- Ken Allred, politician
- Evan Berger, politician
- Ted Godwin, artist and Officer of the Order of Canada
- Jason Hale, politician
- Laureen Harper, spouse of the former Prime Minister of Canada, Stephen Harper
- Doug Horner, politician
- Chris Jamieson, hockey player
- David Joseph, basketball coach and former college player
- Roy Kiyooka, artist and Officer of the Order of Canada
- Greg Kolodziejzyk, cyclist
- Paul Landry, polar explorer
- Aylmer Liesemer, politician
- Colin Low, filmmaker
- Shane Lust, hockey player
- Barry McFarland, politician
- Noah Miller, water polo player and coach
- Caia Morstad, volleyball player
- Jackson Proskow, television newsperson
- Sandra Sawatzky, filmmaker and artist
- Dan Olson, documentary filmmaker
- Jonathan Scott, co-host of Property Brothers
- Jeremy St. Louis, television newsperson
- J. D. Watt, hockey player
- Len Webber, politician
- Stewart Woodman, restaurateur
- Marshal Iwaasa, man who mysteriously disappeared, dropped out

== Arms ==
Coat of arms of Southern Alberta Institute of Technology

Notes
Granted August 20, 2009
Crest
A wolf sejant affronty its head to the dexter proper resting its forepaws on an open book Argent bound Gules.
Escutcheon
Per pale Gules and Azure a lightning bolt Argent grasped in base by two winged hands affronty and clasping each other Or.
Supporters
Two dragons Gules winged Or their undersides Azure each gorged of a coronet of hazelnuts and wild rose flowers Or holding a teepee pole Or and standing on a compartment of sandstone blocks Proper.
Motto
Incipio Et Erudio

== See also ==
- Education in Alberta
- List of universities and colleges in Alberta
- Canadian Interuniversity Sport
- Canadian government scientific research organizations
- Canadian industrial research and development organizations
- Canadian university scientific research organizations
