= Chris Jamieson =

Canadian ice hockey player

- Born: August 28, 1975 (age 50) Calgary, Alberta, Canada
- Height: 5 ft 11 in (180 cm)
- Weight: 205 lb (93 kg; 14 st 9 lb)
- Position: Left wing
- Shot: Left
- Played for: CHL; Tulsa Oilers; BNL; Peterborough Pirates; Paisley Pirates
- NHL draft: Undrafted
- Playing career: 1998–2001

Chris Jamieson (born August 28, 1975) is a Canadian former professional ice hockey player.

== Life and career ==
Jamieson was born in Calgary, Alberta, and attended the Southern Alberta Institute of Technology (SAIT) where he played hockey within the Canadian Collegiate Athletic Association (CCAA). He was recognised for his outstanding play when he was named the 1997-98 SAIT Athlete of the Year, and was selected to the CCAA All-Canadian Team.

Jamieson began his professional career playing the 1998-99 season with the Peterborough Pirates of the British National League (BNL), and the following season he suited up with the Paisley Pirates of the BNL. During the 2000–01 season Jamieson skated with both the Peterborough Pirates and the Tulsa Oilers of the Central Hockey League before retiring from professional hockey.

== Awards and honours ==
Honours	Year
SAIT Athlete of the Year	1997-98
CCAA All-Canadian Team	1997-98
