= Ryan Lindsay (ice hockey) =

Canadian ice hockey player (born 1976)

- Born: April 13, 1976 (age 48); Simcoe, Ontario, Canada
- Height: 6 ft 0 in (183 cm)
- Weight: 183 lb (83 kg; 13 st 1 lb)
- Position: Centre
- Caught: Right
- Played for: IHL; Michigan K-Wings; UHL; Quad City Mallards
- National team: Canada
- NHL draft: Undrafted
- Playing career: 1998–2005

Ryan Lindsay (born April 13, 1976) is a Canadian former professional and collegiate ice hockey player. Prior to turning professional, Lindsay played the 1998–99 season with the Canada men's national ice hockey team.

== Awards and honours ==
Award	Year
CIS Rookie of the Year (Clare Drake Award)	1997–98
