= Kris Brand =

Canadian volleyball player (born 1983)

Personal information
- Full name: Kris Brand
- Born: December 25, 1983 (age 42); Dawson Creek, British Columbia, Canada
- Height: 2.04 m (6 ft 8 in)
- Spike: 350
- Block: 335

Volleyball information
- Current club: Army (Qatar)
- Number: 14

Career
Years	Teams
2010-11; 2010-11; 2009-10; 2008-09; 2008-09; 2007-08	Army (Qatar); 4 Eylul Belediye Spor (Sivas. Turkey); Indios de Mayaguez (Puerto Rico); Koroivos Amaliada (Greece); Knack Randstad Roeselare (Belgium)

National team
2004-present	Canada

Kris Brand (born December 25, 1983, in Dawson Creek, BC) is a Canadian professional volleyball player. He is the youngest of 3 boys. His position on the field is outside hitter. Most recently, Kris played with 4 Eylul Belediye (Sivas, Turkey) and won the A2 Championship. He then transferred on to play in Qatar to finish the 2010/11 season with Army Team. Season 2009/2010 he played in Bamberg, Germany, for the 1st division team VC Franken where he finished the season 4th in scoring. He reached the play-offs with his team in their first year in the A2 Division of Greek volleyball. 2008/2009 he went to Greece after only 1 season with Belgian champions Knack Randstad Roeselare, where he was main spiker of the team together with Ivan Contreras. Brand used to play for Saskatchewan Huskies volleyball team before coming to Belgium. He studied Arts & Science at the University of Saskatchewan.
