= Jason Becker (ice hockey) =

Canadian ice hockey player (born 1974)

- Born: May 26, 1974 (age 52) Saskatoon, Saskatchewan, Canada
- Height: 6 ft 5 in (196 cm)
- Weight: 216 lb (98 kg; 15 st 6 lb)
- Position: Defence
- Shot: Left
- WHL team: Prince George Cougars
- NHL draft: Undrafted
- Playing career: 2000–2009

Jason Becker (born May 26, 1974) is a Canadian former ice hockey defenceman who is an assistant coach for the Prince George Cougars in the WHL.

== Career statistics ==
| | | | Regular season | | | | | Playoffs |
| Season | Team | League | GP | G | A | Pts | PIM | GP | G | A | Pts | PIM |
|---|---|---|---|---|---|---|---|---|---|---|---|---|
| 1990–91 | Saskatoon Blades | WHL | 10 | 3 | 0 | 3 | 0 | — | — | — | — | — |
| 1991–92 | Saskatoon Blades | WHL | 55 | 6 | 2 | 8 | 23 | 22 | 2 | 1 | 3 | 0 |
| 1992–93 | Red Deer Rebels | WHL | 9 | 2 | 2 | 4 | 2 | — | — | — | — | — |
| 1992–93 | Kamloops Blazers | WHL | 17 | 1 | 0 | 1 | 4 | 11 | 1 | 4 | 5 | 6 |
| 1993–94 | Kamloops Blazers | WHL | 2 | 0 | 0 | 0 | 0 | — | — | — | — | — |
| 1993–94 | Swift Current Broncos | WHL | 60 | 9 | 33 | 42 | 28 | 7 | 1 | 2 | 3 | 6 |
| 1994–95 | Swift Current Broncos | WHL | 68 | 7 | 18 | 25 | 25 | 6 | 0 | 2 | 2 | 4 |
| 1995–96 | University of Saskatchewan | CIAU | 28 | 7 | 23 | 30 | 24 | — | — | — | — | — |
| 1996–97 | University of Saskatchewan | CIAU | 22 | 4 | 23 | 27 | 12 | — | — | — | — | — |
| 1997–98 | University of Saskatchewan | CIAU | 27 | 12 | 20 | 32 | 12 | — | — | — | — | — |
| 1998–99 | University of Saskatchewan | CIAU | 41 | 10 | 25 | 35 | 28 | — | — | — | — | — |
| 1999–00 | University of Saskatchewan | CIAU | 39 | 8 | 27 | 35 | 37 | — | — | — | — | — |
| 1999–00 | Fresno Falcons | WCHL | 5 | 0 | 1 | 1 | 0 | 5 | 1 | 1 | 2 | 0 |
| 2000–01 | REV Bremerhaven | Germany2 | 42 | 9 | 14 | 23 | 41 | 8 | 0 | 0 | 0 | 4 |
| 2001–02 | REV Bremerhaven | Germany2 | 50 | 11 | 20 | 31 | 43 | 10 | 2 | 3 | 5 | 4 |
| 2002–03 | Heilbronner EC | Germany2 | 54 | 10 | 15 | 25 | 42 | 4 | 1 | 0 | 1 | 0 |
| 2003–04 | Heilbronner Falken | Germany2 | 33 | 3 | 6 | 9 | 8 | — | — | — | — | — |
| 2003–04 | Cardiff Devils | EIHL | 20 | 2 | 7 | 9 | 8 | 4 | 0 | 4 | 4 | 0 |
| 2004–05 | Cardiff Devils | EIHL | 29 | 6 | 4 | 10 | 4 | 10 | 0 | 2 | 2 | 0 |
| 2005–06 | Heilbronner Falken | Germany3 | 48 | 9 | 28 | 37 | 56 | 4 | 0 | 2 | 2 | 4 |
| 2006–07 | Reading Royals | ECHL | 69 | 10 | 29 | 39 | 22 | — | — | — | — | — |
| 2007–08 | Eispiraten Crimmitschau | Germany2 | 46 | 8 | 24 | 32 | 42 | 6 | 0 | 6 | 6 | 2 |
| 2008–09 | Starbulls Rosenheim | Germany3 | 23 | 3 | 4 | 7 | 14 | 2 | 0 | 0 | 0 | 0 |
| Germany2 totals | | | 225 | 41 | 79 | 120 | 176 | 28 | 3 | 9 | 12 | 10 |

== Awards and honours ==
| Award | Year |
|---|---|
| Clare Drake Award - CIS Rookie of the year | 1995–96 |
