= Disappearance of Marshal Iwaasa =

2019 missing person case in Canada

Marshal Iwaasa
- Born: January 3, 1993; Lethbridge, Alberta, Canada
- Disappeared: November 17, 2019 (aged 26); Lethbridge, Alberta
- Status: Missing for 6 years, 9 months and 15 days
- Education: Southern Alberta Institute of Technology

Locations
1 Brian Waddington Hut trailhead

Marshal Iwaasa (born January 3, 1993) is a Canadian man from Lethbridge, Alberta who disappeared on November 17, 2019, after accessing his storage locker in Lethbridge. His truck was found burned six days later on a rural logging road near Pemberton, British Columbia. He was 26 years old at the time of his disappearance.

== Background ==
Iwaasa was born on January 3, 1993. During his teenage years, he attended Winston Churchill High School in Lethbridge, Alberta. Investigators believe that leading up to his disappearance, Iwaasa had been undergoing stress for a number of months. Prior to his disappearance, Iwaasa had been a computer science student at the Southern Alberta Institute of Technology, at which he, without informing his family, dropped out of after being placed on academic probation. Iwaasa also stopped renewing his cellphone plan without his family knowing.

== Disappearance ==
Iwaasa disappeared after November 17, 2019, last being seen at his mother's residence in Lethbridge, Alberta. Iwaasa told his mother that he would be retrieving computer equipment from a shared storage locker before returning to his home in Calgary. Throughout that night, Iwaasa made multiple attempts to access his storage unit, eventually unlocking it shortly after 6:00 a.m. on November 18. He remained in the unit for just over two hours and was last heard from in the area at 8:30 a.m. His family later reported him as missing.

On November 23, six days after he was last seen, hikers discovered Iwaasa's burned truck at the end of a remote logging road leading toward the Brian Waddington Hut near Pemberton, British Columbia, approximately a 14-hour drive away. According to his family, Iwaasa has no apparent ties to the area. Iwaasa's personal belongings, including identification, clothes, and damaged electronics such as a laptop and three smashed cell phones, were found scattered near the vehicle. The reporting of the discovery was delayed until the following day because the hikers who initially found the truck lacked cell phone service at the time. On November 25, two days after its initial discovery, the Pemberton RCMP located his truck, described as a dark blue 2009 GMC Sierra. Discrepancies between photos taken by the hikers and those taken by the RCMP suggested that the scene had been tampered with. Following a 2020 visit to the scene, Iwaasa's family noted that his truck had missing parts, and some of the items found did not belong to him. In late 2023, Iwaasa's truck was removed from the Brian Waddington Hut trailhead. To the dismay of Iwaasa's family members, his truck was cut into pieces and moved to a landfill.

== Investigation ==
Shortly after the discovery of Iwaasa's truck, authorities initiated a search for him, treating the case as a missing person's investigation. In early December 2019, searches for Iwaasa had been suspended by authorities. By June 2020, over seven months following his disappearance, authorities had not located any trace of Iwaasa. The Pemberton RCMP conducted searches using dogs, drones, and on-foot efforts, yielding no results of Iwaasa's whereabouts.

Simultaneously, Iwaasa's family created a Facebook group which shortly gained thousands of members. They also hired a private investigator, whose search also found no trace of Iwaasa, but did determine the cause of fire to his truck to be arson. In August 2020, Iwaasa's family, who suspected foul play, petitioned for his disappearance to be treated as a criminal case. It was also revealed that Iwaasa's bank cards showed no activity since early November, including no gas purchases throughout the entire drive. Despite the family's efforts to obtain surveillance footage from gas stations along the route, owners refused cooperation without a police request. Due to the non-criminal classification of Iwaasa's case, investigators did not examine potential fingerprints or DNA at the scene. The Lethbridge Police Service released a statement acknowledging the suspicious nature of the disappearance but stated that "there is no credible, corroborated or compelling evidence to suggest foul play or that the matter is criminal in nature".

In 2022, Iwaasa's disappearance was featured on Never Seen Again, a television documentary series on Paramount Plus. The case has also been featured on CBS, Discovery Plus, and various podcasts. Throughout recent years preceding Iwaasa's disappearance, other men had also gone missing in the same region of British Columbia, with two of whom having been found deceased with the RCMP linking "criminal behaviour" with their deaths. Authorities asserted no correlation between these cases.

== See also ==
- List of people who disappeared mysteriously (2000–present)
