= Clare Drake Award =

Canadian men's ice hockey player award

The Clare Drake Award is the annual "Rookie of the Year" award presented to the U Sports men's ice hockey player who is judged by a committee of the U Sports Men's Hockey Coaches Association to be "the most outstanding first-year player in the U Sports who has exhibited exemplary skill and leadership".

First awarded following the 1985–86 season, the award is named after Clare Drake, who is the coach with the most wins in U Sports men's hockey history.

== Winners ==
- 1985–86: Claude Lefebvre (forward)
- 1989–90: Wayne Hynes (centre)
- 1992–93: John Spoltore (centre)
- 1993–94: Jarret Zukiwsky (right wing)
- 1994–95: Sylvain Rodrigue (goaltender)
- 1995–96: Jason Becker (defenceman)
- 1997–98: Ryan Lindsay (centre)
- 1998–99: Eric Schneider (forward)
- 1999–00: Clayton Pool (goaltender)
- 2000–01: Alexandre Tremblay (left wing)
- 2001–02: Matt Dzieduszycki (forward)
- 2002–03: Dean Beuker (right wing)
- 2003–04: Kevin Young (defenceman)
- 2004–05: Mathieu Poitras (goaltender)
- 2005–06: Aaron Sorochan (goaltender)
- 2006–07: Mark Shefchyk (left wing)
- 2007–08: Craig Voakes (left wing)
- 2008–09: Steve DaSilva (right wing)
- 2009–10: Jared Gomes (centre)
- 2010–11: Jason Bast (centre)
- 2011–12: Zach Harnden (right wing)
- 2012–13: Mitchell Porowski (left wing)
- 2013–14: Kevin Bailie (goaltender)
- 2014–15: Spencer Abraham (defenceman)
- 2015–16: Brett Welychka (centre)
- 2016–17: Anthony DeLuca (left wing)
- 2017–18: Kris Bennet (centre)
- 2018–19: Étienne Montpetit (goaltender)
- 2019–20: Mitchell Balmas (centre)
- 2020–21: Not awarded due to COVID-19
- 2021–22: Liam Hawel (centre)
- 2022–23: Samuel Richard (goaltender)
- 2023–24: Connor Ungar (goaltender)
- 2024–25: Sean Tschigerl (centre)
