= Bryan Fraser =

Canadian volleyball player (born 1991)

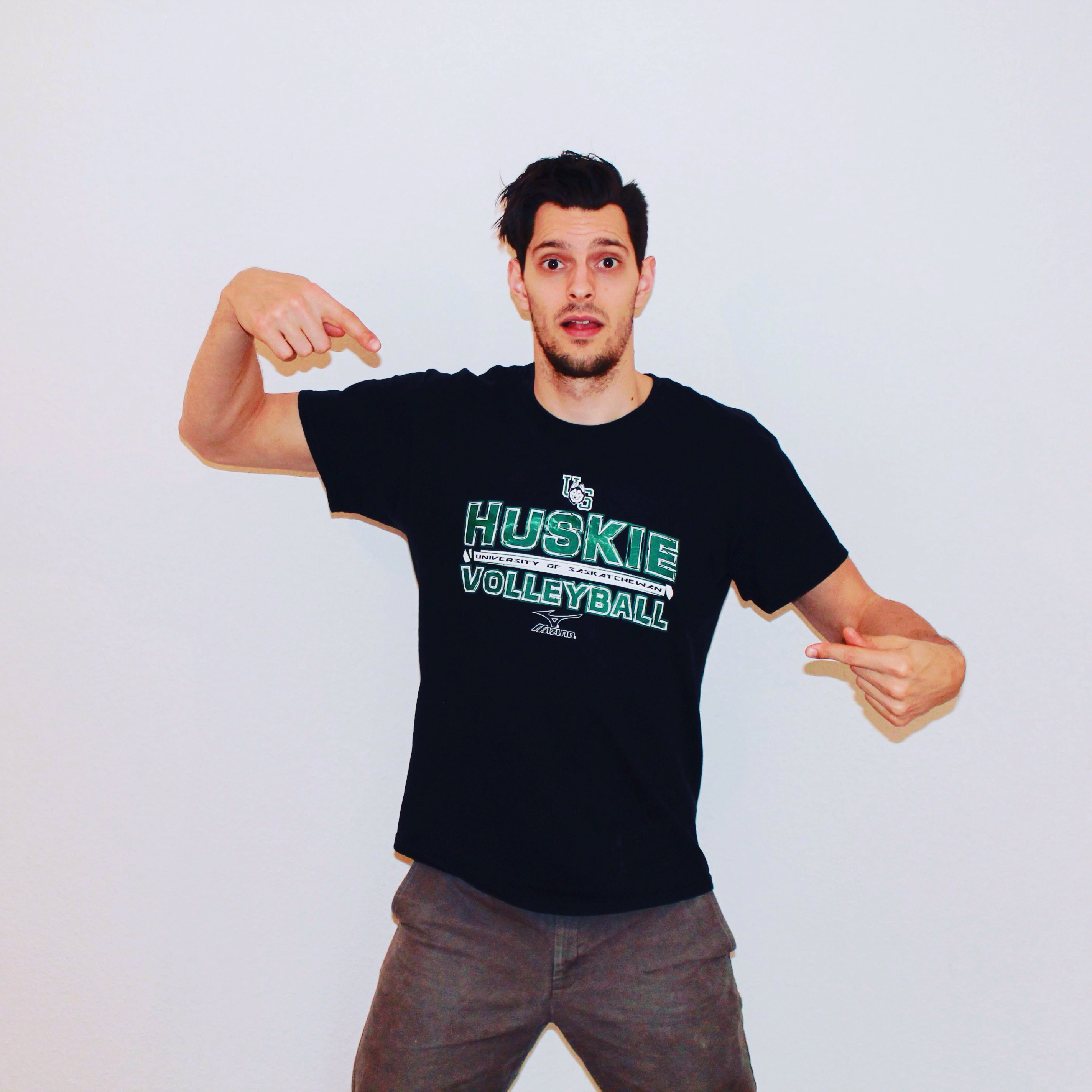

Personal information
- Nationality: Canadian
- Born: January 31, 1991 (age 35); North Battleford, Saskatchewan
- Hometown: Saskatoon, Saskatchewan
- Height: 199 cm (6 ft 6 in)
- Weight: 94 kg (207 lb)
- Spike: 355 cm (140 in)
- Block: 326 cm (128 in)
- Education: University of Saskatchewan

Volleyball information
- Position: Outside hitter

Career
Years	Teams
2009–2014; 2015–2016; 2016–2017; 2017-2018; 2018-2019; 2019-present	(Canada) University of Saskatchewan (Germany) United Volleys Frankfurt (Netherlands) Abiant Lycurgus (France) ASUL Lyon Volley (Germany) TSV Herrsching (Canada) College of the Rockies

National team
2015 - 2016	Canada

Bryan Fraser (born January 31, 1991) is a retired professional volleyball player from Canada. He was a member of the Canada men's national volleyball team from 2015 to 2016. He is now the current head coach of the women's volleyball program at College of the Rockies in Cranbrook, British Columbia.
