= Eddie McCalmon =

Canadian ice hockey player

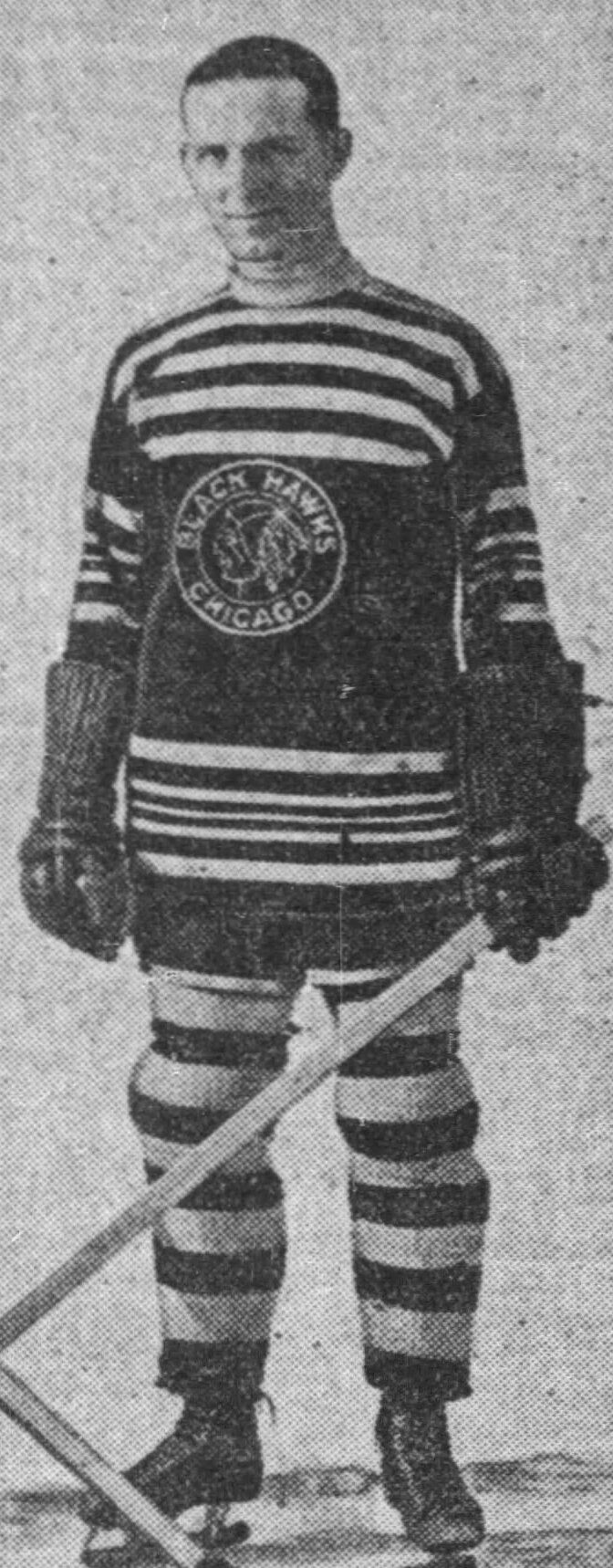
- Born: May 30, 1902; Lumsden, Saskatchewan, Canada
- Died: April 23, 1987 (aged 84)
- Height: 5 ft 8 in (173 cm)
- Weight: 170 lb (77 kg; 12 st 2 lb)
- Position: Right wing
- Shot: Right
- Played for: Chicago Black Hawks; Philadelphia Quakers
- Playing career: 1920–1931

Edward Allison "Cally" McCalmon (May 30, 1902 – April 23, 1987) was a Canadian professional ice hockey right winger who played two seasons in the National Hockey League for the Chicago Black Hawks and Philadelphia Quakers. He played 23 games in the 1927–28 season with Chicago, and 16 games in 1930–31 with Philadelphia. The rest of his career, which lasted from 1920 to 1931, was spent in various minor leagues. McCalmon was born in Varney, Ontario, but grew up in Lumsden, Saskatchewan.

== Career statistics ==
=== Regular season and playoffs ===
			Regular season					Playoffs
Season	Team	League	GP	G	A	Pts	PIM	GP	G	A	Pts	PIM
1917–18	Lumsden Athletic Club	SAHA	—	—	—	—	—	—	—	—	—	—
1918–19	Lumsden Athletic Club	SAHA	10	21	0	21	3	—	—	—	—	—
1920–21	Lumsden Athletic Club	SAHA	10	21	0	21	3	—	—	—	—	—
1921–22	Regina Victorias	SIHA	1	0	0	0	0	—	—	—	—	—
1922–23	Regina Victorias	SIHA	—	—	—	—	—	—	—	—	—	—
1923–24	University of Saskatchewan	N-SSHL	—	—	—	—	—	—	—	—	—	—
1924–25	University of Saskatchewan	N-SSHL	5	2	4	6	4	—	—	—	—	—
1925–26	University of Saskatchewan	N-SSHL	—	—	—	—	—	—	—	—	—	—
1926–27	University of Saskatchewan	N-SSHL	—	—	—	—	—	—	—	—	—	—
1927–28	Saskatoon Sheiks	PHL	12	8	0	8	2	—	—	—	—	—
1927–28	Chicago Black Hawks	NHL	23	2	0	2	8	—	—	—	—	—
1928–29	Tulsa Oilers	AHA	2	0	0	0	5	—	—	—	—	—
1929–30	Toronto Millionaires	IHL	36	6	4	10	10	—	—	—	—	—
1930–31	Philadelphia Quakers	NHL	16	3	0	3	6	—	—	—	—	—
NHL totals			39	5	0	5	14	—	—	—	—	—
