= Saskatchewan Huskies women's soccer team =

University soccer women's team in Canada

Saskatchewan Huskies women's soccer
- Founded: 1984; 42 years ago
- University: University of Saskatchewan
- Head coach: Jerson Barandica-Hamilton (since 2014)
- Conference: Canada West; Prairie Division
- Location: Saskatoon, Saskatchewan
- Stadium: Griffiths Stadium (capacity: 5,743)
- Nickname: Huskies
- Colors: Green, White, and Black

U Sports National Championship appearances
- 2016

Conference division championships
- 2015

The Saskatchewan Huskies women's soccer team represents the University of Saskatchewan in U Sports women's soccer. The Huskies compete in the Prairie Division of the Canada West Conference. The Huskies' sole appearance in the U Sports women's soccer Championship came in 2016. The team plays its home games at Griffiths Stadium.

== History ==
The University of Saskatchewan first fielded a women’s soccer team in an official league in the 1984-85 season. The Huskies earned their first win in an official match in the 1986-87 season tournament.

Ross Wilson, Head Coach of the Huskies from 1988-1993, also served as Athletic Director of the overall University of Saskatchewan Huskies program from 1991-2006. In 2018, Wilson was inducted into the Huskie Athletics Wall of Fame.

The Huskies first earned a spot playoffs based on season performance in the 2012-13 season, where they lost on penalties to the Regina Cougars in the Canada West quarterfinals. The Huskies had previously featured in the 1999 Canada West playoffs due to their status as host.

In 2014, the Huskies earned their first medal, winning bronze in the Canada West playoffs.

Huskies head coach Jerson Barandica-Hamilton was named coach of the year in the Canada West Conference for the 2015-16 season, with the huskies attaining a 10-3-1 record to secure their first CWUAA East Division title.

The Huskies won their second Bronze at the Canada West playoffs in the 2016-17 season. Following their first-ever appearance in the U Sports Women's soccer Championship in 2016, the position of head coach was made full-time beginning in 2017, for the first time in the program's history.

Reported as being projected to perform well in the season, the Huskies had their 2020-21 season cancelled due to the Coronavirus pandemic, but all fifth-year students on the team expressed interest in returning once play was allowed to resume.

In 2021, the Huskies launched the "Goal-A-Thon Community Initiative", an ongoing project to raise funds for the team and connect student athletes with the community through volunteerism.

On 3 November 2023, the Huskies secured their third Canada West bronze medal, defeating the Victoria Vikes on penalties after a scoreless first 90 minutes.

On 14 September 2024, the Huskies tied their then-program record for most goals scored in a game in their 9-0 victory over the University of Manitoba Bisons. This single-game scoring record was first established in a 9-0 win against the Lethbridge Pronghorns in 2010. In the 2024-25 season, the Huskies reached the Canada West playoffs for the 12th consecutive occasion.

Going into the 2025-26 season, the Huskies were ranked 6th in the Canada West conference pre-season coaches poll. On September 7, 2025, the Huskies established a new single-game scoring record, defeating the Lethbridge Pronghorns 10-0, with eight separate players scoring during the game. The Huskies qualified for the Canada West playoffs that season on October 5, after beating the Mount Royal Cougars 2-0. A 1–0 loss at Thunderbird Stadium against the top-ranked UBC Thunderbirds in the Canada West quarterfinals brought an end to the Huskies' 2025-26 season.

Ranked 9th nationally at the outset of the 2026-27 season, the Huskies earned their first ranking in the top 10 of the country since 2015. Their season finished on October 31, 2026, following a 3–1 loss in the Canada West quarterfinals to the Thompson Rivers WolfPack.

Barandica-Hamilton served as assistant coach in the Canadian women's national futsal team which won the inaugural CONCACAF W Futsal Championship in May 2025. The national squad featured three Alumni from the Huskies: goalkeeper Jadyn Steinhauer, who holds the program record for both shutouts and saves made, as well as defender Jade Houmphanh and winger Erica Hindmarsh.

Head Coaches
Coach	Years	Win-loss-tie
Bruce Hoggard	1984-1986	0-6-1
Andy Sharpe	1986-1988	2-8-2
Ross Wilson	1988-1994	
Keith Pritchard	1994-1996	2-13-5
Peter Reichert	1996-2002	14-41-14
Colin Melnyk	2002-2000	17-43-12
Tom LaPointe	2007-2014	
Janine Harding	2014-2015	
Jerson Barandica-Hamilton	2014-	

== International ==
Kaylyn Kyle (2006–07): Canada

== Awards and honours ==
=== All-Canadians ===
- Sam Simpson (First Team 1993-94; 1994–95)
- Jacqueline Lavallee (Second Team 1999-00)
- Erin Hammett (Second Team 2000-01)
- Meagan Manson (Second Team 2015-16)

=== Canada West Awards ===
- Sam Simpson (Player of the Year 1993-94)
- Ross Wilson (Coach of the Year 1993-94)
- Team (Fair Play Award 2007-08; 2008–09)
- Jerson Barandica-Hamilton (Coach of the Year 2015-16)
- Anna Oliver (Student-Athlete Community Service 2023-24)
