= Jason McCalmon =

British boxer

Jason 'Raven' McCalmon
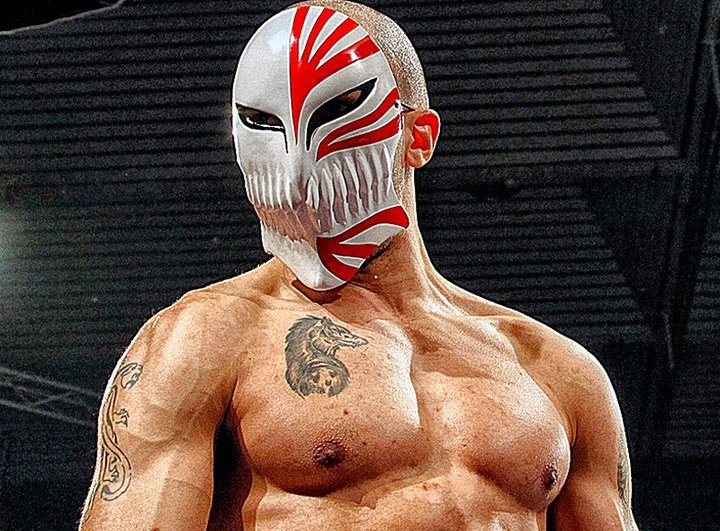

Personal information
- Nickname: Raven The Laois Raven
- Nationality: (England) English
- Born: Jason Aaron McCalmon; December 1, 1987 (age 38) Halifax, West Yorkshire, England
- Height: 6 ft 1 in (1.85 m)
- Weight: Super middleweight

Boxing career
- Stance: Orthodox

Boxing record
- Total fights: 5
- Wins: 5
- Win by KO: 1
- Losses: 0
- Draws: 0
- No contests: 0

Jason Aaron McCalmon (born December 1, 1987) is a professional boxer who currently resides in Huddersfield.

== Amateur career ==
As an amateur boxer McCalmon represented Rawthorpe ABC.

Jason McCalmon won a silver medal at the Lemesia Cup event in Cyprus facing off against the European Champion Evgeniy Tischenko from Russia. McCalmon had lost by split decision however McCalmon was awarded the boxer of the tournament for his display where he fought three fights in three days whereas Tischenko only fought one fight due to withdrawals.

== Professional career ==
McCalmon turned pro at the age of 22. He made his professional debut on October 9, 2010, at the Leisure Centre in Huddersfield, where he fought against James Tucker. McCalmon punished Tucker for four rounds until the referee halted a stop to the contest declaring McCalmon the winner by TKO.

Jason fought once more before the end of 2010 he fought on December 2, 2010, at the Cedar Court Hotel in Huddersfield against Jamie Ambler. Jason cruised his way to a well-deserved 40–35 victory with Ambler losing a point in the third round for holding.

His third fight was against the experienced Dean Walker on the Gary Sykes vs Carl Johanneson undercard. Jason McCalmon battered Sheffield's Dean Walker over four rounds, decking the experienced man twice on his way to a comfortable 40–34 victory. Dean Walker went down in the third round from a right to the temple and went down again in the fourth and final round.

== Professional boxing record ==
4 Wins (1 knockouts), 0 Losses (0 knockouts), 0 Draws, 0 No Contest
Res.	Record	Opponent	Type	Rd., Time	Date	Location	Notes
Win	5-0-0	(England) Ian Turnbull	UD	4 (4)	2011-07-23	Leisure Centre, Huddersfield, England	
Win	4-0-0	(England) Jody Meikle	UD	4 (4)	2011-05-21	North Bridge Leisure Centre, Halifax, England	
Win	3-0-0	(England) Dean Walker	UD	4 (4)	2011-03-05	Leisure Centre, Huddersfield, England	
Win	2-0-0	(England) Jamie Ambler	UD	4 (4)	2010-12-02	Cedar Court Hotel, Ainley Top, Huddersfield, England	
Win	1-0-0	(England) James Tucker	TKO	4 (6), 0:46	2010-10-09	Leisure Centre, Huddersfield, England	
