= University of Saskatchewan Physical Activity Complex =

Multipurpose facility in Saskatoon, Saskatchewan

Coordinates: 52°7′48″N 106°37′53″W

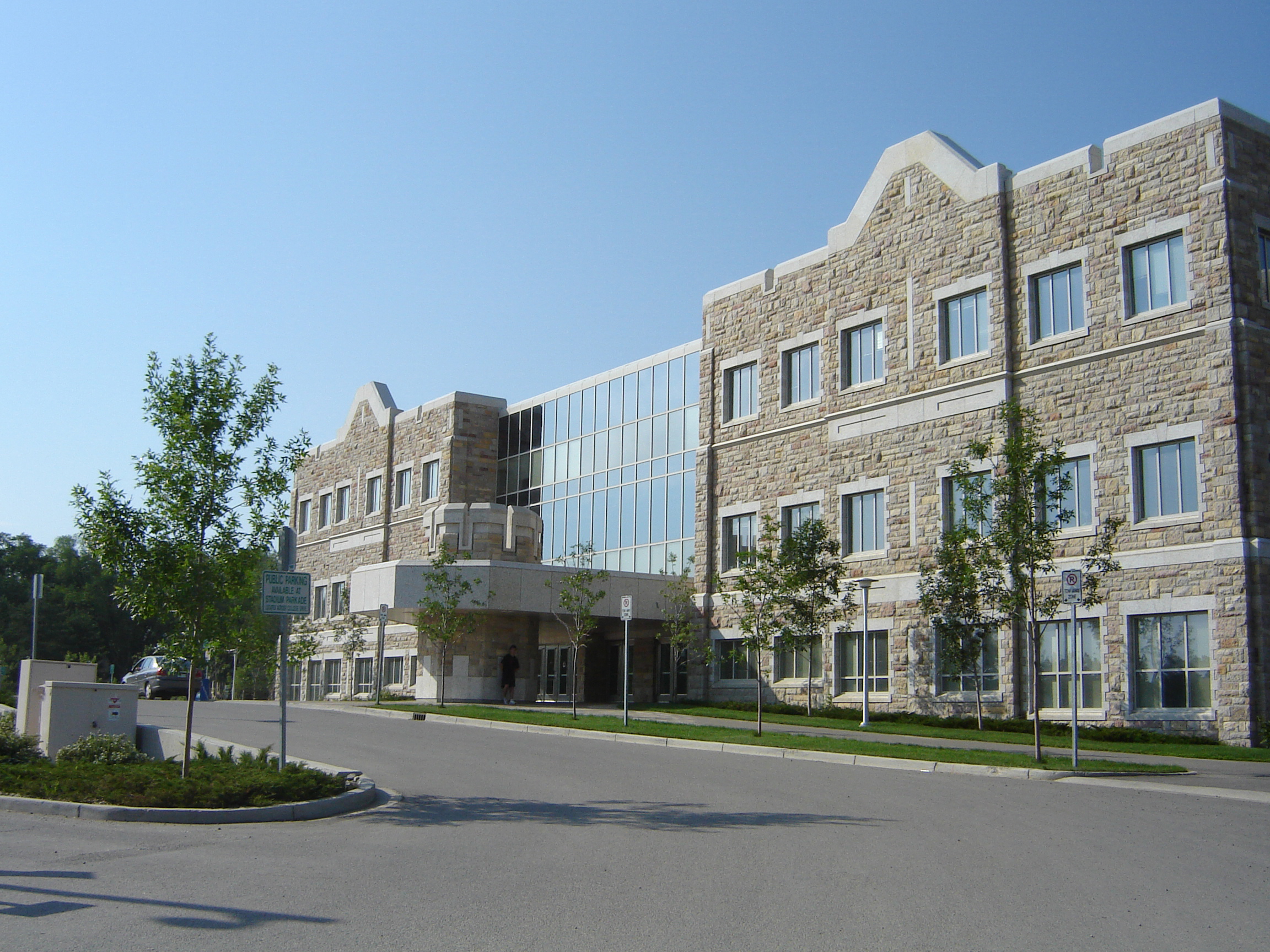
Physical Activity Complex University of Saskatchewan

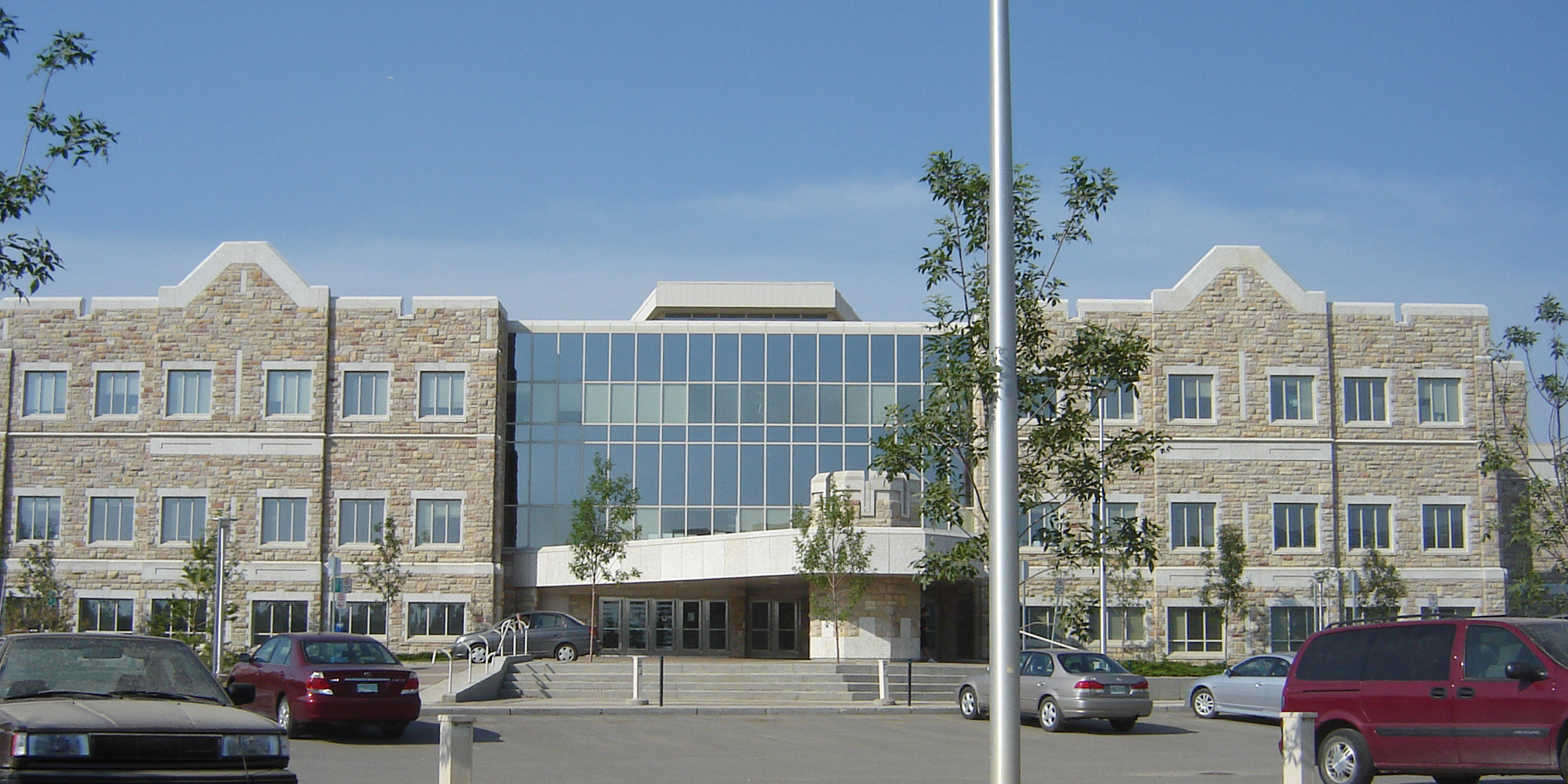
Physical Activity Complex University of Saskatchewan

The University of Saskatchewan Physical Activity Complex (PAC) is a multipurpose facility on the University of Saskatchewan campus. It opened on August 25, 2003. It has three full gymnasiums, three basketball, three volleyball, and four squash & racquetball courts. It hosts the University of Saskatchewan Basketball team on a court with a maximum capacity of 2426.

== See also ==
- University of Saskatchewan Kinesiology

(University of Saskatchewan)
