= Shields (surname) =

Shields is a surname. Notable people with the surname include:

- Brooke Shields (born 1965), American actress
- Carol Shields (1935–2003), American author
- Carol Shields (ophthalmologist) (born 1957), American doctor
- Cian Shields (born 2005), British-Irish racing driver
- Clayton Shields (born 1976), American basketball player
- Colin Shields (born 1980), British ice hockey player
- Claressa Shields (born 1995), American professional boxer and professional mixed martial artist
- Derek "Mob" Shields (born 1977), a member of the Lords of Chaos
- Eileen Shields (born 1970), American footwear designer
- Esther Lucas Shields (1868–1940), American nurse
- Francis Alexander Shields (1941–2003), Brooke Shields' father
- Frank Shields (1909–1975), American tennis player and actor
- Frank Shields (director), Australian film and TV director
- Frank Shields (politician), Oregon politician
- Frederic Shields (1833–1911), British artist, illustrator and designer
- George Oliver Shields (1846–1925), American outdoors magazine editor
- Harry Shields (1899–1971), American dixieland jazz musician
- Jake Shields (born 1979), American mixed martial arts fighter
- James Shields
  - James Shields (baseball) (born 1981), American baseball player
  - James Shields (politician, born 1810) (1810–1879), American politician and U.S. Army officer
  - James Shields (Ohio politician) (1762–1831), U.S. Representative from Ohio
- Jefferson Shields (1829–1918), American slave
- Jerry A. Shields (1937–2025), American ophthalmologist
- Jimi Shields (born 1967), Irish musician and architect
- John Shields
- Kathy Shields, Canadian basketball coach
- Ken Shields
  - Ken Shields (basketball), Canadian basketball coach
- Kevin Shields (born 1963), Irish musician
- Larry Shields (1893–1953), American dixieland jazz clarinetist
- Lonnie Shields (born 1956), American blues singer, songwriter, and guitarist
- Mark Shields (1937–2022), American political pundit
- Mark Shields (police commissioner) (born 1959), Jamaica's Deputy Police Commissioner
- Michael Shields, several people
- Mick Shields (1912–1983), Australian rugby league footballer
- Mick Shields (newspaper manager) (1921–1987), British newspaper manager
- Nicki Shields, British television presenter
- Paul Shields, several people
- Pete Shields (1891–1961), American baseball player
- Portia Holmes Shields, American academic administrator
- Robert Shields, multiple people
  - Rev. Robert Shields (1918–2007), American minister and diarist
- Ryan Shields (born 1983), Jamaican sprinter from Chicago, Illinois
- Sam Shields (born 1987), American football player
- Scot Shields (born 1975), American baseball player
- Shavon Shields (born 1994), Danish basketballer
- Steve Shields
  - Steve Shields (baseball) (born 1958), American baseball player
  - Steve Shields (basketball coach) (born 1965), American basketball coach
  - Steve Shields (ice hockey) (born 1972), Canadian ice hockey player
- Teri Shields (1933–2012), Brooke Shields' mother
- Thomas Todhunter Shields (1873–1955), Canadian religious leader
- Tyler Shields (born 1982), American photographer
- Will Shields (born 1971), American football player
- William Ernest Shields (1892–1921), Canadian military aviator
- Willow Shields (born 2000), American actress

== Fictional characters ==
- Lana Shields, a character on Three's Company
- Miss Shields, a character in the 1983 American movie A Christmas Story

== See also ==
- Shiels, a surname
- Shields (disambiguation)
