= Tom Bishop (basketball) =

Former Canadian Basketball Player

Personal information
- Listed height: 6 ft 6 in (1.98 m)

Career information
- High school: Western Canada High School (Calgary, Alberta)
- College: Mount Royal College (1971–1972); University of Calgary (1972-1976)
- Position: Center

Career highlights
- CIAU First Team All-Canadian (1976); Canada West Player of the Year (1976); Canada West First Team All-Star (1976); University of Calgary Male Athlete of the Year (1976); Canada West Co-coach of the Year (1983) (also awarded to Ken Shields); University of Calgary Sports Hall of Fame (2007)

Tom Bishop is a former Canadian basketball player, CIAU All-Canadian, member of the Canada men's national basketball team and coach.

== University ==
Bishop was a four-year starter at the University of Calgary (1972-1976). He played a season with Mount Royal College before transferring to Calgary. He is regarded as one of the most talented inside players to ever play for the University of Calgary.

Bishop was a CIAU first team All-Canadian, Canada West first team All-Star and Canada West Player of the Year. Bishop was the first Calgary men's basketball player in history to be named an All-Canadian or Canada West Player of the Year.

In the 1976 season, he averaged 20.1 points and 8.8 rebounds per game. This year he led Calgary to be the Canada West champions and finish in the top 8 of the CIAU national tournament. This year he was also named the University of Calgary's male athlete of the year.

Over the course of his four years at Calgary, Bishop averaged 12.4 points and 7.2 rebounds per game. Even though he played over 40 years ago, he is still the school's leading rebounder in terms of rebounds per game (7.2). And even though he only played 80 conference games, he still ranks fourth overall in rebounds with 577.

In 2007, Bishop was inducted into the University of Calgary Sports Hall of Fame. He was the second basketball player to be inducted into the university's hall of fame, the first being Karl Tilleman in 1995.

== International ==
Bishop was a member of the Canadian national men's basketball team for six seasons (1977–80, 82–83). This included being named to the men's national team that qualified for the 1980 Moscow Olympics. However, Bishop unfortunately was unable to compete in these 1980 games given that Canada boycotted said Olympics as a result of the Soviet Union's invasion of Afghanistan.

This 1980 Canadian men's team was positioned to perform well in these Olympics given that Canada competed for the bronze medal in the Olympic games preceding and following these 1980 Olympics (1976, 1984) and this time in Canadian basketball has been described as "arguably the Canadian national team's greatest era" and "Canada's golden age of basketball".

Despite the 1980 boycott, Bishop competed in many international tournaments for Team Canada, including FIBA World Championships and Pan American games.

== Coaching ==
Bishop later became an assistant coach for the University of Calgary men's basketball team. He was the interim head coach in the 1983–84 season when head coach, Gary Howard, took a sabbatical leave. Calgary performed well under Bishop this year, going 7–3 in conference play; 28-14 overall; and reaching the conference finals, losing to the University of Victoria en route to UVic winning their 5th consecutive national championship that year. This year, he was named Canada West co-coach of the year, along with University of Victoria's Ken Shields. Notable players Bishop coached this season include Karl Tilleman and John Rhodin.

Bishop has also coached successfully at the high school level in Calgary at various schools.

== Personal life ==
Bishop graduated from the University of Calgary with a degree in Physical Education. He is a native Calgarian.
