= Victoria Vikes women's basketball =

Women's college basketball team

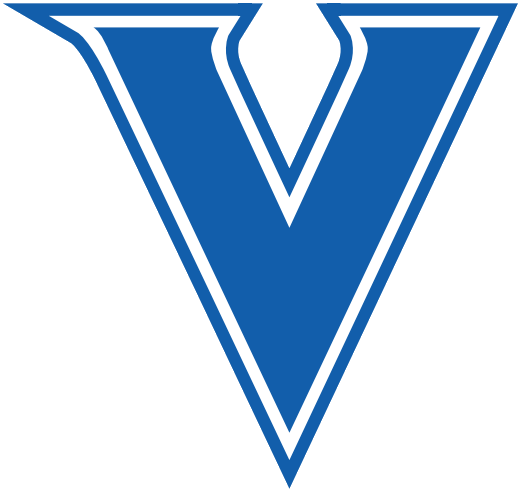
- University: University of Victoria
- Head coach: Carrie Watts (1st season)
- Location: Victoria, British Columbia
- Arena: CARSA Building
- Conference: Canada West Universities Athletic Association
- Nickname: Vikes
- Colors: Blue and Gold

U Sports tournament appearances
- 1985, 1986, 1987

Conference tournament champions
- 1985, 1986, 1987

Conference regular-season champions
- 1979, 1980, 1981, 1982, 1984, 1985, 1986, 1991, 1994, 1995, 1996, 1997, 1998, 1999, 2000

Uniforms
Home	Away

The Victoria Vikes women's basketball team represent the University of Victoria in the Canada West Universities Athletic Association of U Sports women's basketball. The Vikes have captured the Bronze Baby, awarded to the U Sports National Champions, a record nine times. The McKinnon Building and Gym was the former home of the Vikes, and the basketball court itself was named "Ken and Kathy Shields Court" in 2002, honouring the Vikes legendary basketball coaches. As a side note, the facility also hosted the 1993 CIS women's basketball national championships and a 1999 Vancouver Grizzlies NBA intra-squad game.

Kathy Shields, the most accomplished head coach in program history, captured 15 Canada West titles (1979, 1980, 1981, 1982, 1984, 1985, 1986, 1991, 1994, 1995, 1996, 1997, 1998, 1999, 2000), along with eight national championships (1979, 1980, 1981, 1984, 1986, 1991, 1997, 1999). Of note, eight of her former players and assistant coaches became head coaches at the university level. Winning 320 out of 371 regular season games, Shields was bestowed the Order of Canada in 2016.

== History ==
Beginning in 1975, the Vikes enjoyed a run of dominance that lasted until 1987. Enjoying 10 Canada West titles, along with five national titles, the 1990s would see a return to prominence. Highlighted by seven conference titles, including six consecutive, spanning from 1994 to 2000, the decade also saw three more national title performances.

Arriving at the University of Victoria in 1979, Tracie McAra would be part of a five-year run that saw the Vikes win 102 games, while losing only 14. Winning the Bronze Baby in three consecutive years (1980–82), the achievement complemented by four consecutive Canada West conference titles (1979–82).

Between 1985 and 1987, the Vikes would appear in three straight Canadian Interuniversity Athletic Union (now U Sports) gold medal games, winning in 1985 and 1987. During that stretch, Lori Clarke emerged as a Canada West conference All-Star and CIAU All-Canadian in every season. Winning the Nan Copp Player of the Year Award in 1987, it marked the crowning touch to her athletic sojourn at the University of Victoria.

The 1986–87 season would also mark a finale for Janet Fowler. In her final season, she averaged 17.5 points and 8.1 rebounds per game. Earning the Most Valuable Player Award of the Canadian Interuniversity Sport (now U Sports) Championship Tournament, the Vikes were 28–2 in conference play during the season.

Having played with the Vikes from 1981–85, hoisting the Bronze Baby twice, Sandy Espeseth returned for her final year in 1987–88. Leading the Vikes to a record of 18 wins, compared to 2 losses, Espeseth earned CIS First Team All-Canadian honors, averaging 12.4 points per game and a career-high 3.5 rebounds per game. Espeseth would later compete for Canada as a member of the National Cycling Team at the 1992 Barcelona Summer Olympics.

The Vikes captured their last Bronze Baby trophy in 2003. The first time that the program hosted the National Championships was in 1993, finishing as the runner-up versus the University of Winnipeg.

After eight seasons, head coach Dani Sinclair stepped down as head coach of the Vikes in March 2020. In her last season, the Vikes were 12–8. Throughout her career, the Vikes amassed 105 wins, compared only to 59 losses.

In May 2021, the Vikes hired former UBC Thunderbirds women's basketball player and coach Carrie Watts to be their new head coach. Having played for Debbie Huband at UBC, Watts captured the Bronze Baby trophy in 2004. Among her coaching achievements, Watts was an assistant coach for Team Canada at the 2019 Winter Universiade.

=== Season by season record ===
Season	Conf. Record	Overall	Conf. Rank	Finish
2017–18	17–4	17–6	2nd	Canada West Tournament: Lost Quarterfinals (vs Calgary)
2018–19	12–8	13–10	6th	Canada West Tournament: Lost Quarterfinals (vs Regina)
2019–20	12–8	13–9	7th	Canada West Tournament: Lost 2nd Round (75–80 vs Saskatchewan)

=== Individual Leader Scoring ===
Legend
GP	Games played	GS	Games started	MIN	Minutes played
FG	Field-goals	3FG	3-point field-goals	FT	Free-throws
PTS	Points	AVG	Points per game

Season	Player	GP	Min	FG	3FG	FT	Pts	Avg	Canada West Rank
2019–20	Ashlyn Day	20	567	127	16	68	338	16.9	8th

=== Recent U Sports Tournament results ===
Year	Seed	Round	Opponent	Result
1982 CIAU national championship		First Round; Semi-Finals; Gold Medal Game	University of Toronto; University of Winnipeg; Bishop's Gaiters	W 81–31; W 72–41; W 70–55

== International ==
- Lori Clarke Canada: Canada women's national basketball team (1985–92)

== Awards and honours ==
=== Canada West Awards ===
==== Canada West Hall of Fame ====
- Victoria Vikettes, (1979–83): Canada West Hall of Fame – 2019 Inductee
- Kathy Shields: Canada West Hall of Fame – 2019 Inductee

==== Canada West All-Stars ====
- 2010 Canada West First Team All-Star : Kayla Dykstra
- 2009 Canada West First Team All-Star : Kayla Dykstra
- 1998 Canada West First Team All-Star : Lisa Koop
- 1997 Canada West First Team All-Star : Lisa Koop
- 1996 Canada West First Team All-Star : Lisa Koop
- 1991 Canada West First Team All-Star: Kelly Boucher
- 1990 Canada West First Team All-Star: Kelly Boucher
- 1989 Canada West First Team All-Star: Kelly Boucher
- 1988 Canada West First Team All-Star: Karla Karch
- 1988 Canada West Second Team All-Star: Kelly Boucher
- 1987 Canada West First-Team All-Star: Janet Fowler
- 1987 Canada West All-Star: Lori Clarke
- 1987 Canada West Second Team All-Star: Karla Karch
- 1986 Canada West All-Star: Lori Clarke
- 1985 Canada West All-Star: Lori Clarke
- 1983 Canada West All-Star: Tracie McAra
- 1982 Canada West All-Star: Tracie McAra
- 1981 Canada West All-Star: Tracie McAra
- 1981 Canada West First-Team All-Star: Luanne Krawetz
- 1980 Canada West First-Team All-Star: Luanne Krawetz
- 1980 Canada West First-Team All-Star: Carol Turney-Loos
- 1979 Canada West First-Team All-Star: Luanne Krawetz

==== Player of the Year ====
- 2009: Kayla Dykstra
- 1998: Lisa Koop
- 1997: Lisa Koop
- 1996: Lisa Koop

==== Coach of the Year ====
- 1979–80: Kathy Shields
- 1986–87: Kathy Shields
- 1991–92: Kathy Shields
- 1992–93: Kathy Shields
- 1994–95: Kathy Shields
- 1996–97: Kathy Shields
- 1997–98: Kathy Shields
- 2000–01: Kathy Shields

=== U Sports Awards ===
- 2003–04 Sylvia Sweeney Award Outstanding student-athlete: Krystal O'Bryne

==== All-Canadians ====
- 2010 CIS First Team All-Canadian: Kayla Dykstra
- 2009 CIS First Team All-Canadian: Kayla Dykstra
- 1998 CIS First Team All-Canadian: Lisa Koop
- 1997 CIS First Team All-Canadian: Lisa Koop
- 1996 CIS First Team All-Canadian: Lisa Koop
- 1991 CIS Second Team All-Canadian: Kelly Boucher
- 1988 CIS Second Team All-Canadian : Karla Karch
- 1987 CIS First Team All-Canadian: Janet Fowler
- 1987 CIAU All-Canadian: Lori Clarke
- 1986 CIAU All-Canadian: Lori Clarke
- 1985 CIAU All-Canadian: Lori Clarke
- 1983 CIAU First Team All-Canadian: Tracie McAra
- 1981 CIAU First Team All-Canadian: Luanne Krawetz
- 1980 CIAU First Team All-Canadian: Carol Turney-Loos

==== U Sports championship MVP ====
- 2002–03 Lindsay Anderson
- 1999–00 Lindsay Brooke
- 1997–98 Lindsay Brooke
- 1991–92 Jenny Sutton
- 1986–87 Janet Fowler
- 1984–85 Lori Clarke
- 1981–82 Luanne Hebb
- 1980–81 Shelly Godfrey
- 1979–80 Carol Turney

==== U Sports championship All-Star Team ====
- 1998 CIS Championship Tournament All-Star : Lisa Koop
- 1996 CIS Championship Tournament All-Star : Lisa Koop
- 1987 CIS Championship Tournament All-Star: Karla Karch
- 1983 CIAU Tournament All-Star: Tracie McAra
- 1981 CIAU Tournament all-star: Luanne Krawetz
- 1980 CIAU Tournament All-Star: Luanne Krawetz

==== Peter Ennis Award ====
Awarded to the Coach of the Year

- 1979–80: Kathy Shields
- 1991–92: Kathy Shields
- 1998–99: Kathy Shields
- 2009–10: Brian Cheng

==== Nan Copp Award ====
Awarded to the Player of the Year

- 2008–09: Kayla Dykstra
- 1986–87: Lori Clarke
- 1982–83: Tracie McAra
- 1981–82: Luanne Hebb
- 1979–80: Carol Turney-Loos

==== Tracy MacLeod Award ====
- 2008–09 Vanessa Forstbauer, Victoria

=== Victoria Vikes Hall of Fame ===
- Class of 2019 Inductee: Lori Clarke
- Class of 2017 inductee: Carol Turney-Loos
- Class of 2012 inductee: 1981–82 Women’s Basketball Team
- Class of 2006 Inductee: Luanne Krawetz-Hebb
- Class of 2002 inductee: Kathy Shields

=== University Awards ===
- 2020 Victoria Vikes Provost Award for Excellence presented to a returning student-athlete with the highest academic average in the previous year Hannah Walline, Co-winner
- 2020 Victoria Vikes Varsity Highlights Awards: Marissa Dheensaw
- 1987 Victoria Vikes Female Athlete of the Year: Lori Clarke

== Top 100 ==
In celebration of the centennial anniversary of U SPORTS women’s basketball, a committee of U SPORTS women’s basketball coaches and partners revealed a list of the Top 100 women's basketball players. Commemorating the 100th anniversary of the first Canadian university women’s contest between the Queen’s Gaels and McGill Martlets on February 6, 1920, the list of the Top 100 was gradually revealed over four weeks. A total of 11 Vikes were named to the Top 100.

Player	Team(s)	Years	Accolades
Mary Coutts	Victoria	1965–1967	
Carol Turney-Loos	Saint Mary's; Victoria; UBC	1973–1980	Recipient of the 1980 Nan Copp Award
Luanne Hebb Krawetz	Victoria	1977–1982	
Tracie McAra	Victoria	1978–1983	Played for Canada in Basketball at the 1984 Summer Olympics
Sandy Espeseth	Victoria	1981–1988	
Karla Karch	Calgary; Victoria	1982–1988	
Lori Clarke	Victoria	1984–1987	
Janet Fowler	Victoria	1984–1987	
Kelly Boucher	Calgary; Victoria	1985–1991	Played for Canada in Basketball at the 1996 Summer Olympics; Also played for Canada in Basketball at the 2000 Summer Olympics; Competed for the Charlotte Sting of the Women's National Basketball Association (WNBA).
Lisa Koop	Victoria	1993–1998	
Kayla Dykstra	Victoria	2006–2011	Recipient of the 2009 Nan Copp Award
