= Vikes =

Vikes may refer to:

== Canada ==
- Victoria Vikes, sports teams of the University of Victoria in British Columbia

== United States ==
- Vikes, a nickname for the Cleveland State Vikings, sports teams of Cleveland State University, Ohio
- Vikes, a nickname for the Minnesota Vikings, an American football team in the NFL based in Minneapolis
