= Shield (disambiguation) =

A shield is a hand-held protective device meant to intercept attacks.

Shield may also refer to:

== Forms of protection ==
=== From attack ===
- Human shield, the use of civilians to deter an attack in warfare
- Riot shield, used by police forces around the world for crowd control purposes
- SHiELD, acronym for the United States Self-Protect High-Energy Laser Demonstrator defensive laser weapon

=== From radiation ===
- Cold shield, used to protect an object from radiative heating
- Electromagnetic shielding, the use of conductive material to block electromagnetic fields
- Lead shielding, the use of lead as a form of radiation protection
- Radiation shield, protection against ionizing radiation
- Shielded cable, electrical conductors enclosed by a conductive layer

=== Other forms of protection ===
- Dalkon Shield, a contraceptive intrauterine device (IUD)
- Gravitational shield, a hypothetical process of shielding an object from the influence of a gravitational field
- Heat shield, which protects a spacecraft or ballistic missile
- Tunnelling shield, used in excavation through soft soil
- Shielding, or cocooning, action taken by those who are clinically extremely vulnerable in relation to the COVID-19 pandemic

== Currency ==
- Écu ("shield" in French), unit of currency, historically used in France
- Escudo ("shield" in Portuguese and Spanish), unit of currency, historically used in Portugal, Spain, and their former colonies, and still used in Cape Verde to this day
- Scudo (disambiguation) ("shield" in Italian), a unit of currency, historically used in Bolivia, several former Italian states, and Malta
- Shield nickel, the first United States five cent piece to be made out of copper-nickel

== Geography and geology ==
- Shield (geology), a large area of exposed rocks that is tectonically stable
- Shield Nunatak, a prominent nunatak in Antarctica
- Shield volcano, a type of volcano usually built almost entirely of fluid lava flows

== Arts, entertainment, and media ==
=== Fictional entities ===
- Shield (Archie Comics), one of several fictional patriotic superheroes
- Shield (Artemis Fowl), in the Artemis Fowl novel series, a magical ability possessed by fairies
- S.H.I.E.L.D., a fictional agency in the Marvel comics universe, led by Nick Fury
- Scyld Scefing (or Shield Sheafson), a legendary Danish king in the epic poem Beowulf

=== Games ===
- Pokémon Shield, one of the two paired Pokémon Sword and Shield games for the Nintendo Switch
- The Shield (video game), based on the television series

=== Television ===
- Agents of S.H.I.E.L.D., a television series based on the Marvel comics
- The Shield, a television police drama

=== Other uses in arts, entertainment, and media ===
- Aspis (Menander), translated as The Shield, a comedy play by Menander
- "Shield" (song), a song by Deep Purple on the album The Book of Taliesyn
- Shield (1963), a science-fiction novel by Poul Anderson
- Shield of Heracles, an archaic Greek epic poem attributed to Hesiod, concerning the expedition of Heracles and Iolaus against Cycnus

== Sports ==
- Baskerville Shield, a trophy awarded to the winner of rugby league test series between Great Britain and New Zealand
- County Antrim Shield, a Northern Irish football competition
- County Championship Shield, formed in 2008 and originally played for by second tier teams in the RFU County Championship
- FA Community Shield, an English football trophy
- IFA Shield, an annual football competition organized by the Indian Football Association
- Indonesian Community Shield, a pre-season football competition held the week before the season begins in Indonesia every year
- Istanbul Shield, a Turkish football tournament which organised between 1930 and 1939
- J. J. Giltinan Shield, an Australian rugby league football trophy
- Johan Cruyff Shield, a football trophy in the Netherlands named after legendary Dutch football player Johan Cruyff, also often referred to as the Dutch Super Cup
- League Leaders' Shield, a trophy awarded to the team finishing the season top of Super League in the sport of rugby league football
- Sheffield Shield, a perpetual shield awarded to the Australian state cricket team that wins the final
- Supporters' Shield, an annual award given to the Major League Soccer team with the best regular season record, as determined by the MLS points system
- Thacker Shield, a rugby league football trophy awarded to the winner of a match between the champion clubs of the Canterbury Rugby League and West Coast Rugby League
- The Shield (professional wrestling), a professional wrestling stable in WWE

== Technology and transportation ==
- Bumper (car), known as shield in British English
- Shield, name for expansion boards for Arduino microcontroller kits
- The Nvidia range of Android-based gaming products, including:
  - Nvidia Shield TV
  - Shield Portable
  - Shield Tablet

== Other uses ==
- Shield (heraldry), the principal portion of a coat of arms
- Shield (surname)
- Highway shield, the United States uses shield-shaped signs for route markers, signs displaying the name and/or number of the road along which it is placed
- Shielding effect, in chemistry, reduced attraction of electrons to an atomic nucleus
- Scutum (constellation) (Latin for "Shield"), a small constellation near the celestial equator
- a police officer’s badge

== See also ==
- Shields (disambiguation)
