= Shields Township =

Shields Township may refer to one of the following places:

In Canada

- Shields township, Algoma District, Ontario (geographical / historical)

In the United States

- Shields Township, Lake County, Illinois
- Shields Township, Holt County, Nebraska

See also

- Shields (disambiguation)
