= Ryan Shields =

Ryan Shields may refer to:

== People ==
- Ryan Shields (sprinter), Jamaican sprinter

== Other uses ==
- Ryan Shields (character), a minor character in the Cars movie franchise

== See also ==
- Ryan (given name)
- Shields (surname)
