= Michael Shields =

Michael Shields may refer to:

- Michael Shields (footballer) (born 1986), Cork Gaelic football star
- Michael W. Shields, British computer scientist
- Michael Shields, body snatcher as part of a group called the London Burkers
- Michael Shields, Liverpool football fan convicted of attempted murder in Bulgaria, see Conviction of Michael Shields

== See also ==
- Mick Shields (1912–1983), Australian rugby league footballer
- Michael Patrick Shiels, radio host
