= Ken Shields =

Ken Shields may refer to:

- Ken Shields (basketball), a Canadian basketball coach
- Ken Shields, 1988-2004 coach for Northern Kentucky Norse men's basketball
- Ken Shields, lead singer of the 1980s Canadian rock band Streetheart
