= Shields (disambiguation) =

Shields are hand-held protective devices meant to intercept attacks.

Shields may also refer to:

== Places ==
=== United Kingdom ===
- Shields, Tyneside, England, a pair of towns across the River Tyne
- Shields Road subway station, an underground station in Glasgow, Scotland

=== United States ===
- Shields, Indiana, an unincorporated community
- Shields, Kansas, an unincorporated community
- Shields, Michigan, an unincorporated community in Saginaw County
- Shields, North Dakota, an unincorporated community near Bismarck
- Shields, Pennsylvania, an unincorporated community in Leetsdale, Allegheny County
- Shields, Dodge County, Wisconsin, a town
- Shields, Marquette County, Wisconsin, a town
- Shields River, a Yellowstone River tributary
- Shields Township, Holt County, Nebraska

== People ==
- Shields (surname), list of notable people with the surname

== Art, entertainment, and media ==
- Shields (album), 2012 album by Grizzly Bear
- Shields (Star Trek), a technology that protects starships, space stations, and planets from damage in the Star Trek universe

== Other uses ==
- Shields (keelboat), a sailboat class
- Shields (card suit), one of the four suits in standard Swiss playing cards

== See also ==
- Shield (disambiguation)
