= John Shields =

John Shields may refer to:

- John Shields (chef), American chef, food writer, and host of the PBS television show Coastal Cooking with John Shields
- John Shields (cricketer) (1882–1960), English cricketer
- John Shields (explorer) (1769–1809), member of the Lewis and Clark Expedition
- John C. Shields (1848–1892), American jurist from Arizona Territory
- John G. Shields (1811–1856), American politician from Iowa
- John K. Shields (1858–1934), U.S. Senator from Tennessee
- John V. Shields (1932–2014), American businessman
- Jack Shields (1929–2004), Canadian politician
