= Gary Howard (basketball coach) =

Canadian university basketball player and coach (born 1940)

Personal information
- Born: August 28, 1940 Inwood, Iowa, USA
- Died: December 10, 2025 (aged 85) Oliver, British Columbia, Canada

Career history

Coaching
- 1968-1974: Brandon University
- 1974-1995: University of Calgary

Career highlights
- 4x Canada West conference coach of the year (1982, 1984, 1989, 1992); 2x Canada West conference champion (1976, 1993); 4x CIAU Final 8 appearances (1976, 1979, 1980, 1993); Brandon University Sports Wall of Fame Inductee (1996)

Gary Howard (1940 - 2025) was a Canadian university ("CIAU") player and coach. In his 26-year CIAU coaching career, he was named the Canada West conference coach of the year four times; led the University of Calgary Dinos to two Canada West championships; led the Dinos to four CIAU Final 8 appearances; and won over 300 games.

== University playing career ==
Before his coaching career, Howard played basketball at Brandon University, being described as a "standout" and "successful" player.

== University coaching career ==
Howard coached a total of 26 seasons in the CIAU, 6 at Brandon University (1968-1974) and 20 at the University of Calgary (1974-1982; 1983-1995). Throughout his career, Howard won more than 300 games.

=== Brandon coaching career ===
Shortly after his playing career, Howard was named as the head coach of his alma mater, Brandon University. Howard coached the Brandon Bobcats for 6 seasons (1968-1974). Howard is credited with establishing the foundation for Brandon's future successes and national championships in the 80s and 90s.

=== Calgary coaching career ===
Howard coached the Calgary Dinos for 20 seasons (1974-1982, 1983-1995). This is the second-longest coaching tenure for men's basketball at Calgary.

During his time at Calgary, Howard was named Canada West coach of the year four times (1982, 1984, 1989, 1992). He led the Dinos to two Canada West championships (1976, 1993). He also led the Dinos to four CIAU Final 8 appearances (1976, 1979, 1980, 1993).

During his time at Calgary, Howard coached 11 All-Canadians and 42 Canada West All-stars. Howard coached three of the four men's basketball players who have been inducted into the University of Calgary Hall of Fame (Tom Bishop, Karl Tilleman and Richard Bohne). Howard coached five Canada West players of the year (Tom Bishop, Steve Atkin, Karl Tilleman, John Vigna and Richard Bohne). Howard coached two players who later were selected to the Canadian Olympic team (Tom Bishop, Karl Tilleman).

=== Statistics ===
Year	Team	Team Finish	Overall Record	Pct
1968-69	Brandon		2-0	100%
1969-70	Brandon		0-3	0%
1970-71	Brandon		6-15	28.6%
1971-72	Brandon		4-14	22.2%
1972-73	Brandon		14-17	45.2%
1973-74	Brandon		14-20	41.2%
1974-75	Calgary	Canada West Third Place	15-9	62.5%
1975-76	Calgary	CIAU Final 8, Canada West Champion	31-5	86.1%
1976-77	Calgary	Canada West Third Place	20-11	64.5%
1977-78	Calgary	Canada West Second Place	27-11	71.1%
1978-79	Calgary	CIAU Final 8, Canada West Second Place	18-17	51.4%
1979-80	Calgary	CIAU Final 8, Canada West Second Place	23-18	56.1%
1980-81	Calgary	Canada West Second Place	17-17	50.0%
1981-82	Calgary		15-16	48.4%
1983-84	Calgary	CIAU Regional, Canada West Semifinalist	16-9	64.0%
1984-85	Calgary	CIAU Regional	18-14	56.2%
1985-86	Calgary	CIAU Regional, Canada West Semifinalist	17-16	51.5%
1986-87	Calgary		11-17	39.3%
1987-88	Calgary		11-24	31.4%
1988-89	Calgary	Canada West Semifinalist	23-13	63.9%
1989-90	Calgary	Canada West Semifinalist	6-8	42.9%
1990-91	Calgary		8-19	29.6%
1991-92	Calgary	Canada West Semifinalist	20-16	55.6%
1992-93	Calgary	CIAU Consolation Winner, Canada West Champion	27-10	55.6%
1993-94	Calgary	Canada West Semifinalist	14-18	43.8%
1994-95	Calgary	Canada West Semifinalist	10-20	33.3%
Carrer	Brandon, Calgary	Canada West Semifinalist	387-357	52.0%

== Post-career recognition ==
Howard was inducted into Brandon University's Sports Wall of Fame (1996). The Calgary Booster Club recognized Howard as an Honoured Athletic Leader in 1995.

== Personal life / death ==
Howard was born on August 28, 1940 in Inwood, Iowa. He passed away on December 10, 2025 in Oliver, British Columbia. He was survived his wife, Ann.
