= Shield (surname) =

Shield is a surname. Notable people with this surname include:

- George Shield (1876–1935), British Labour Party politician
- Hugh Shield (1831–1903), English academic, barrister and Liberal Party politician who sat in the House of Commons from 1880 to 1885
- Ian Shield (1914–2005), English cricketer
- Jeff Shield (1953–2009), Australian professional rugby league player
- Joe Shield, former quarterback in the National Football League
- Leroy Shield (1893–1962), American film score and radio composer
- Little Shield (died 1879), chieftain of the Northern Cheyenne from 1865 to 1879
- Mark Shield (born 1973), former Australian Football referee
- Pretty Shield (1856–1944), medicine woman of the Crow Nation
- William Shield (1748–1829), English composer, violinist and violist

== See also ==
- Shields (surname)
