= Shields (suit) =

Playing card suit from Switzerland

- Native name: German: Schilten
- Deck: Swiss-suited playing cards
- Invented: 15th century

Shields (German: Schilten), also called Escutcheons, is one of the four playing card suits in a deck of Swiss-suited playing cards. This suit was invented in 15th century German speaking lands and is a survivor from a large pool of experimental suit signs created to replace the Latin suits. One example from the mid-15th century is a five-suited deck with the Latin suits plus a suit of shields. Another example is the Hofämterspiel, a medieval handmade deck from 1453 to 1457 where each suit depicts shields carrying different coat of arms of four kingdoms: France, Germany, Bohemia and Hungary.

It is equivalent to the German Hearts (suit), as both the shields and hearts suits lower halves end in a point. The deuce of shields also feature hearts in its design.

== Characteristics ==
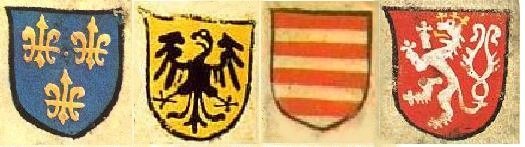
Hofämterspiel shield suits

As its name suggests, the shield symbol is a stylized depiction of a warrior's shield in yellow. The coat of arms varies from deck to deck.

In the German language, the shield is called Schilten.

Shields appear as one of four suits alongside feathers, hats, and bells in several incomplete packs made in Basel. The dates for these packs range from 1470 to about 1529. The 10-rank card utilizes pips rather than the characteristic banner.

Shields appear as one of four suits alongside crowns, bells, and acorns in a set of mutilated cards possibly made in Alsace in 1480.

The standard four Swiss-German suits of shields, acorns, hawkbells, and flowers were found in playing cards inside a book cover (circa 1530) made in Basel. These cards feature the distinguishing banner replacing the 10-rank, and have the three court cards: King seated in a throne, Ober, and Unter. This Swiss-German suit system is believed to have developed earlier with the earliest example dated between 1433 and 1451, though only cards from the shields suit survived.

== Cards ==
The following images depict the suit of Shields from an 1850 Swiss-suited pack:

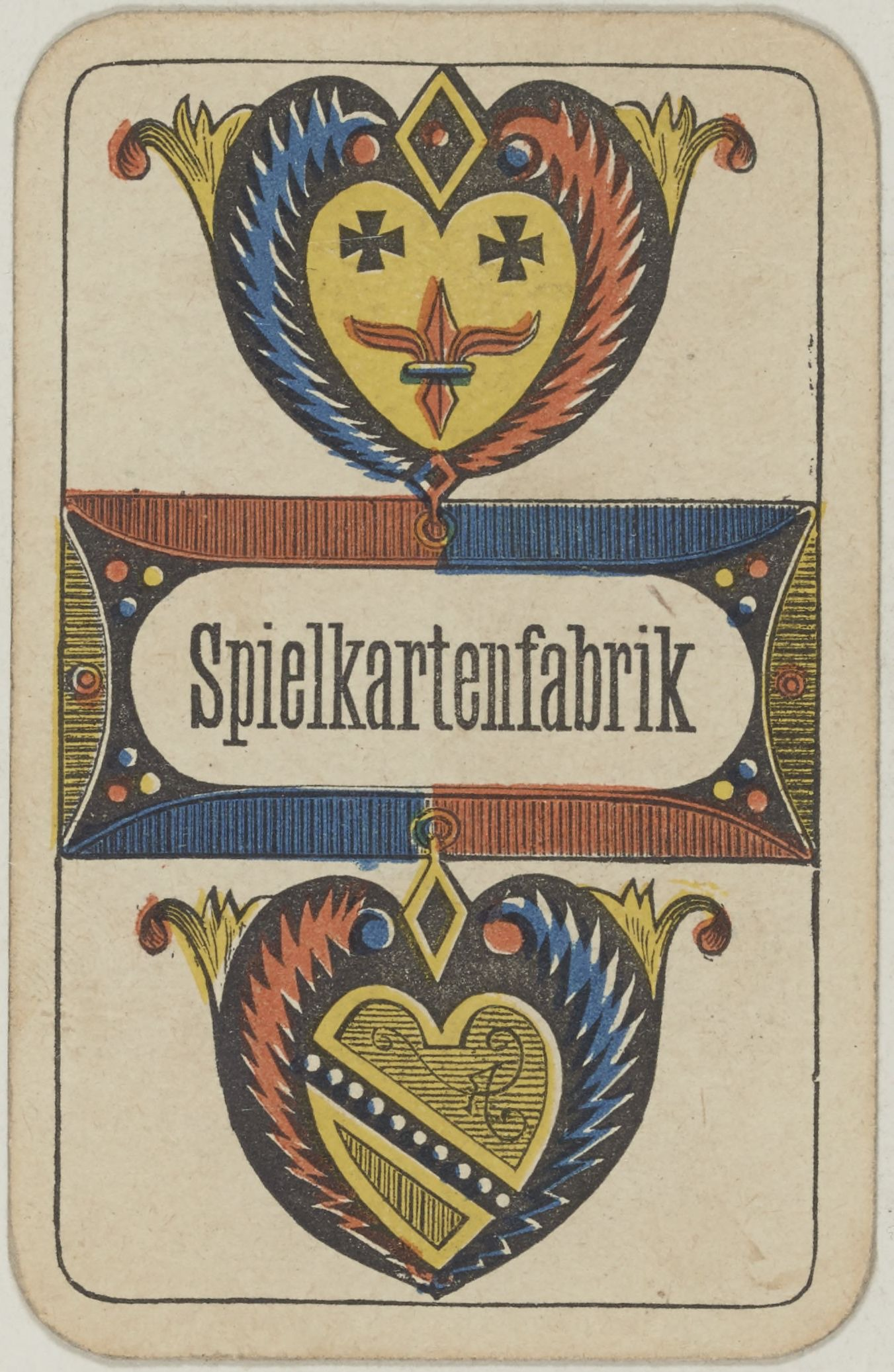
Deuce

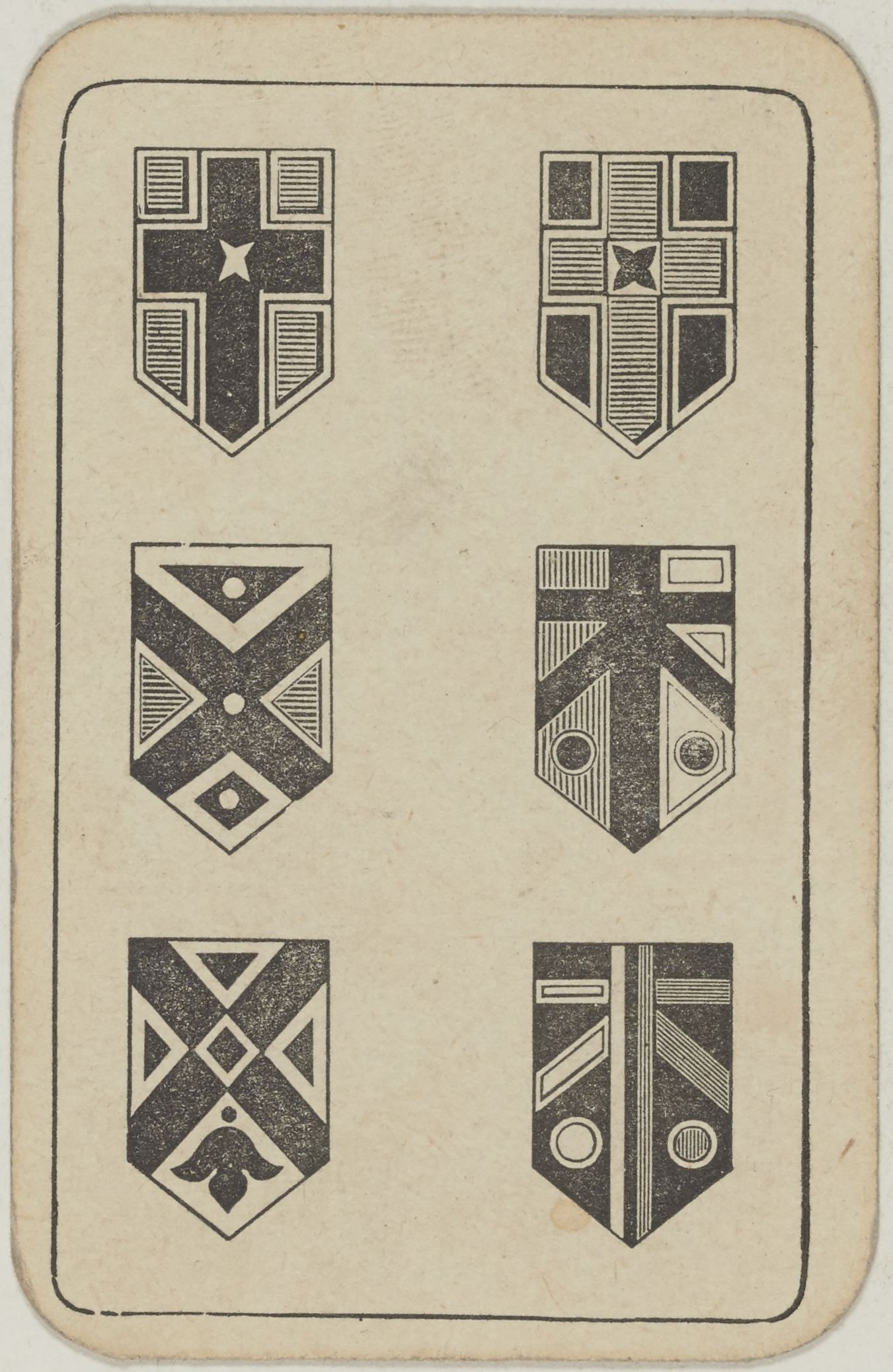
6

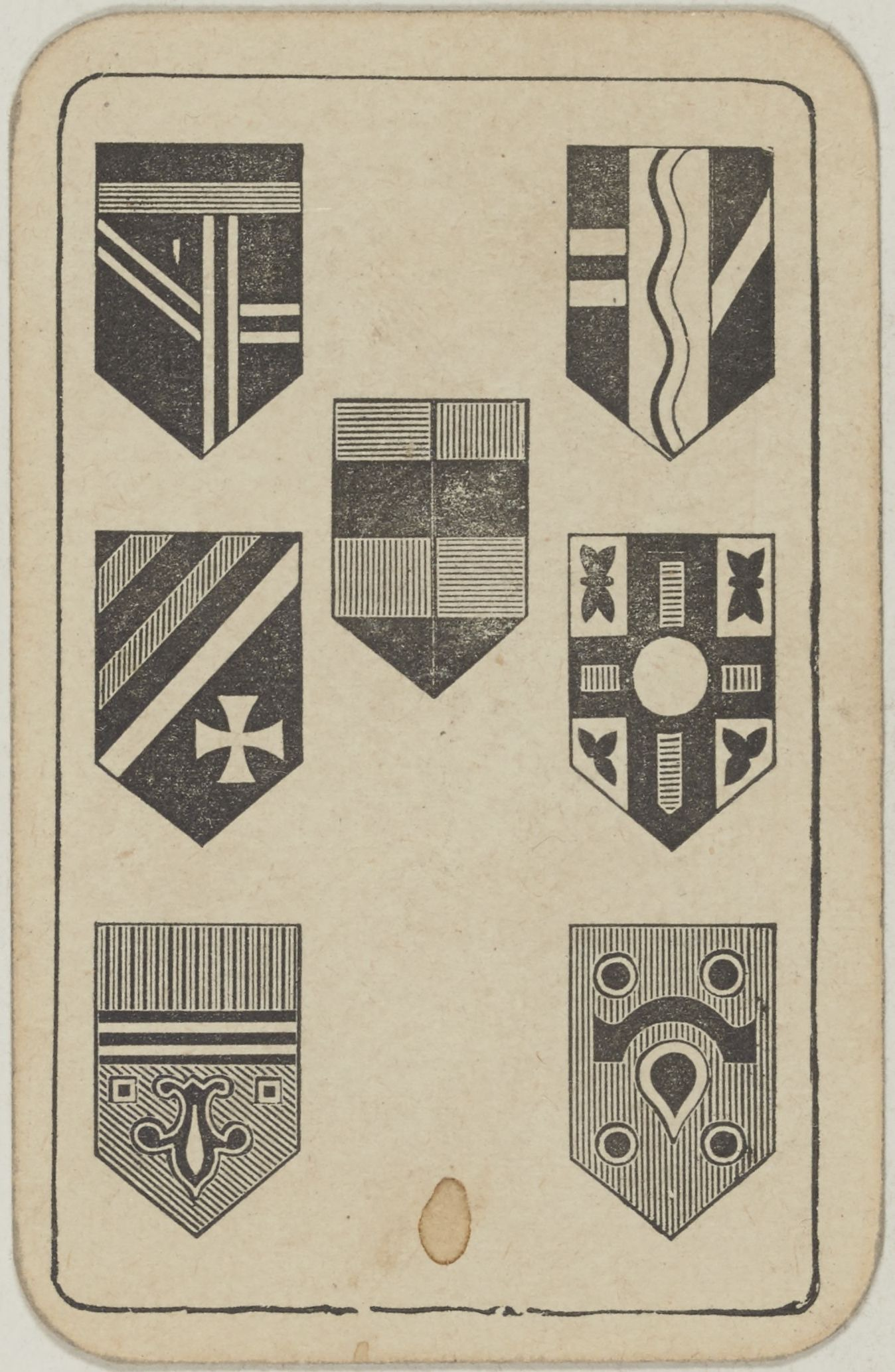
7

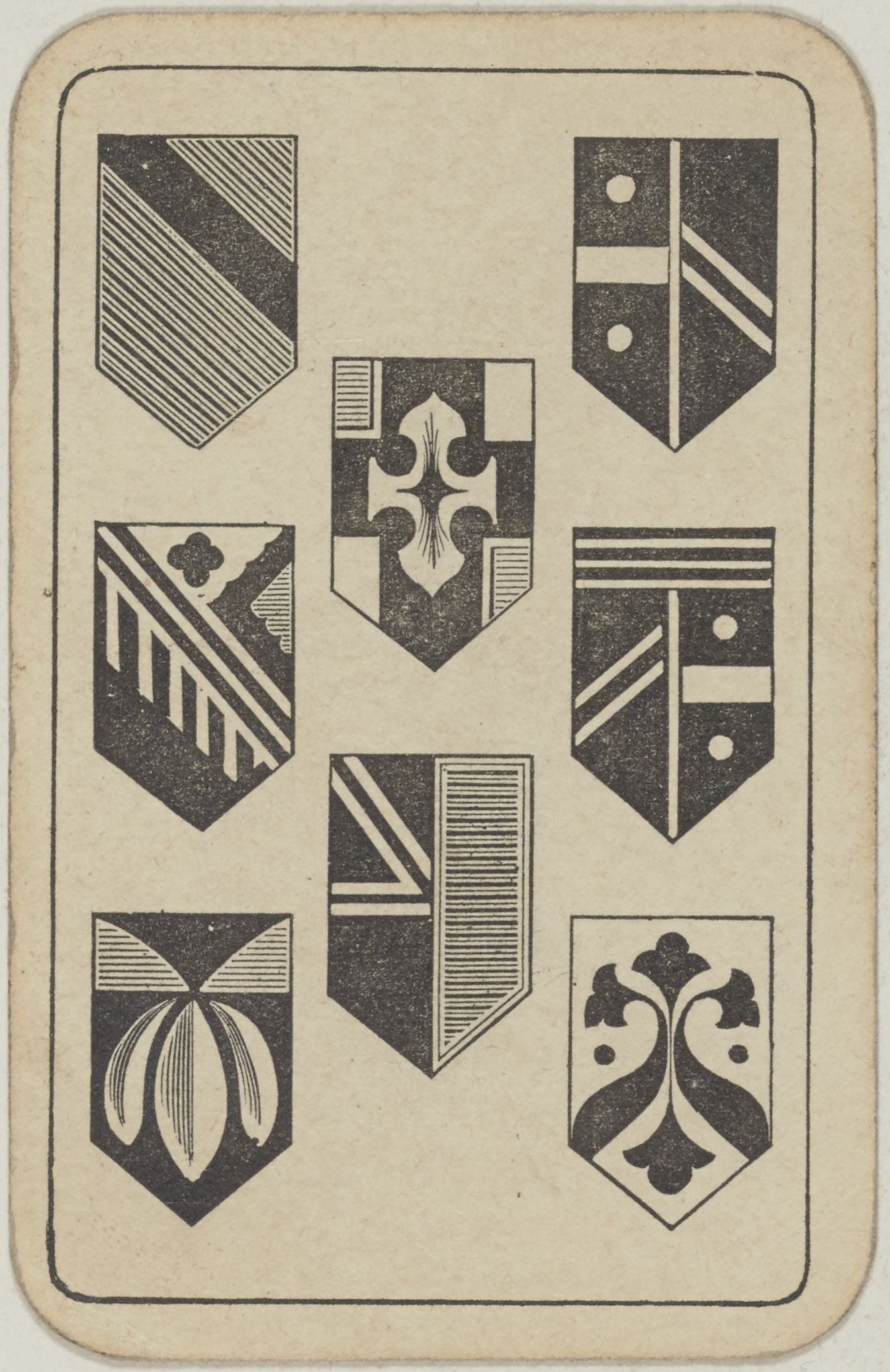
8

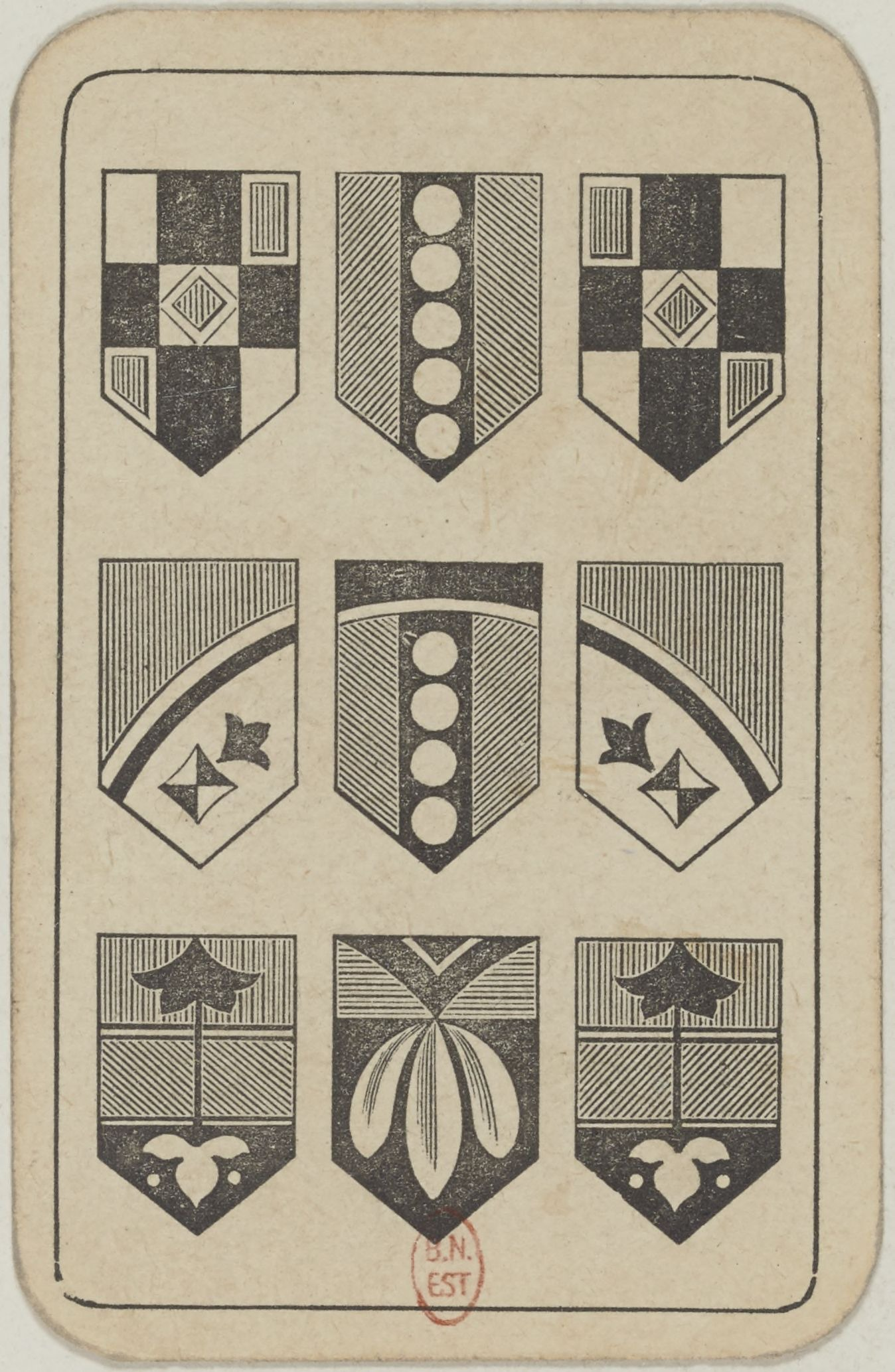
9

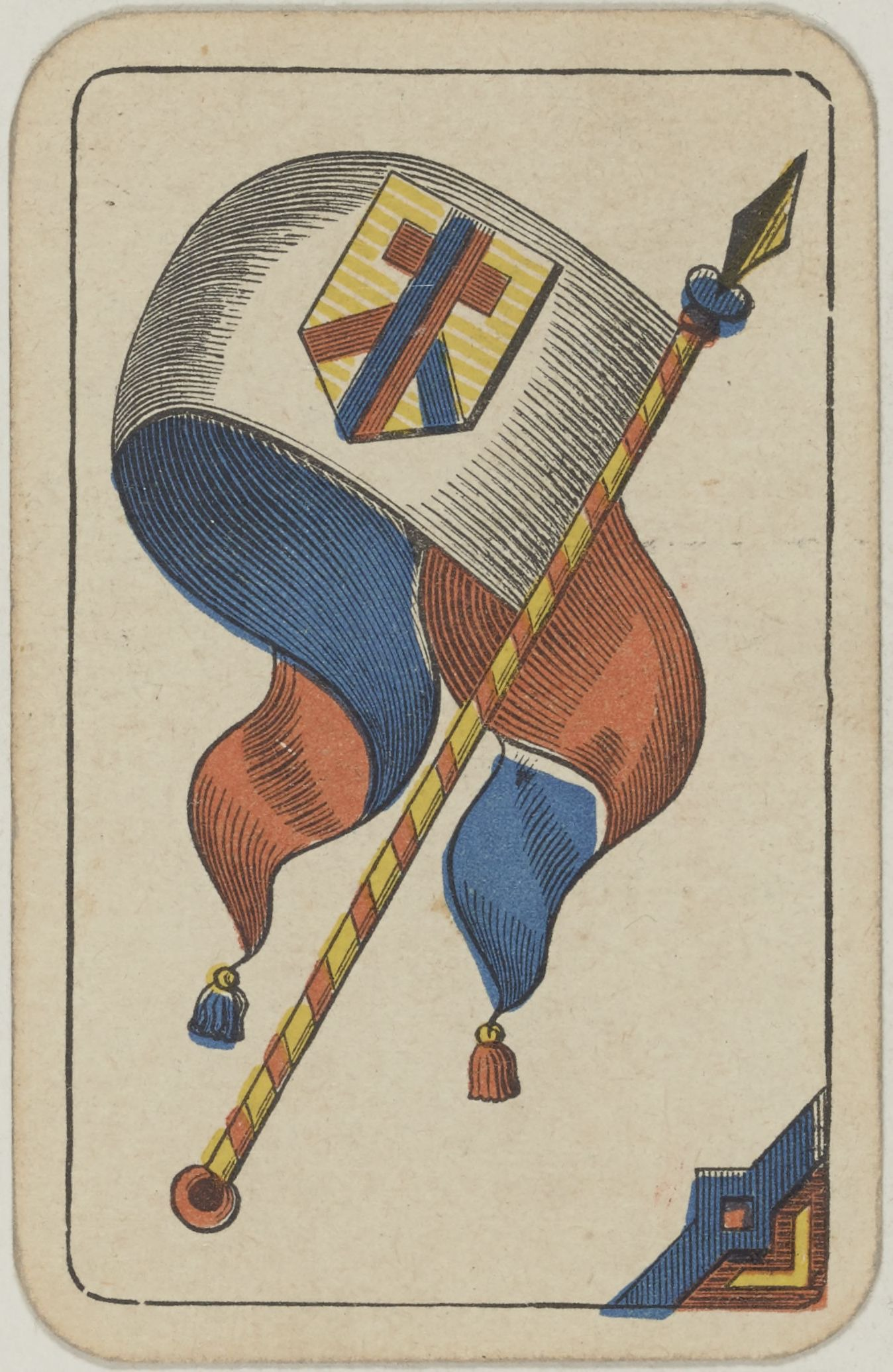
Banner

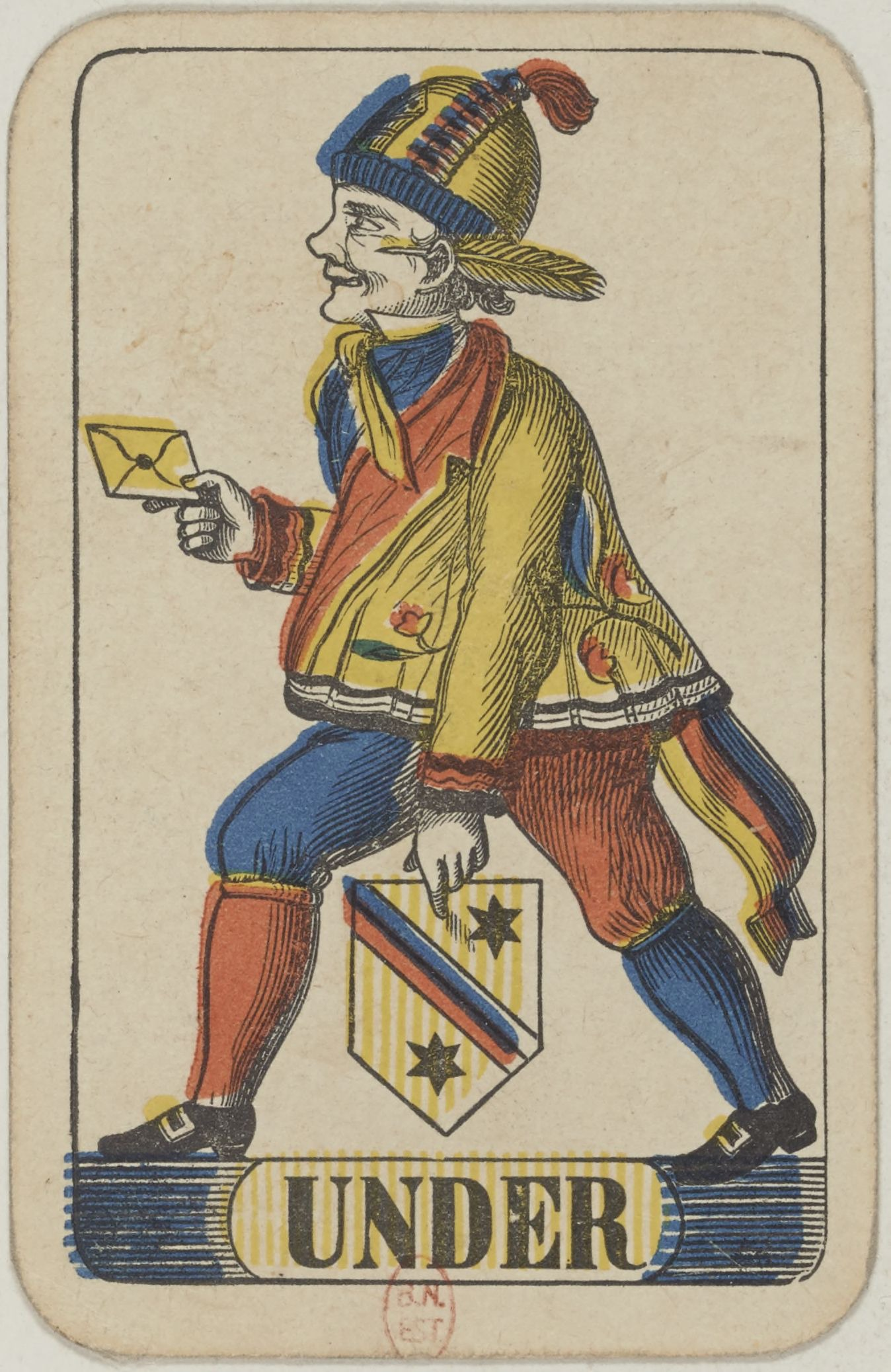
Unter

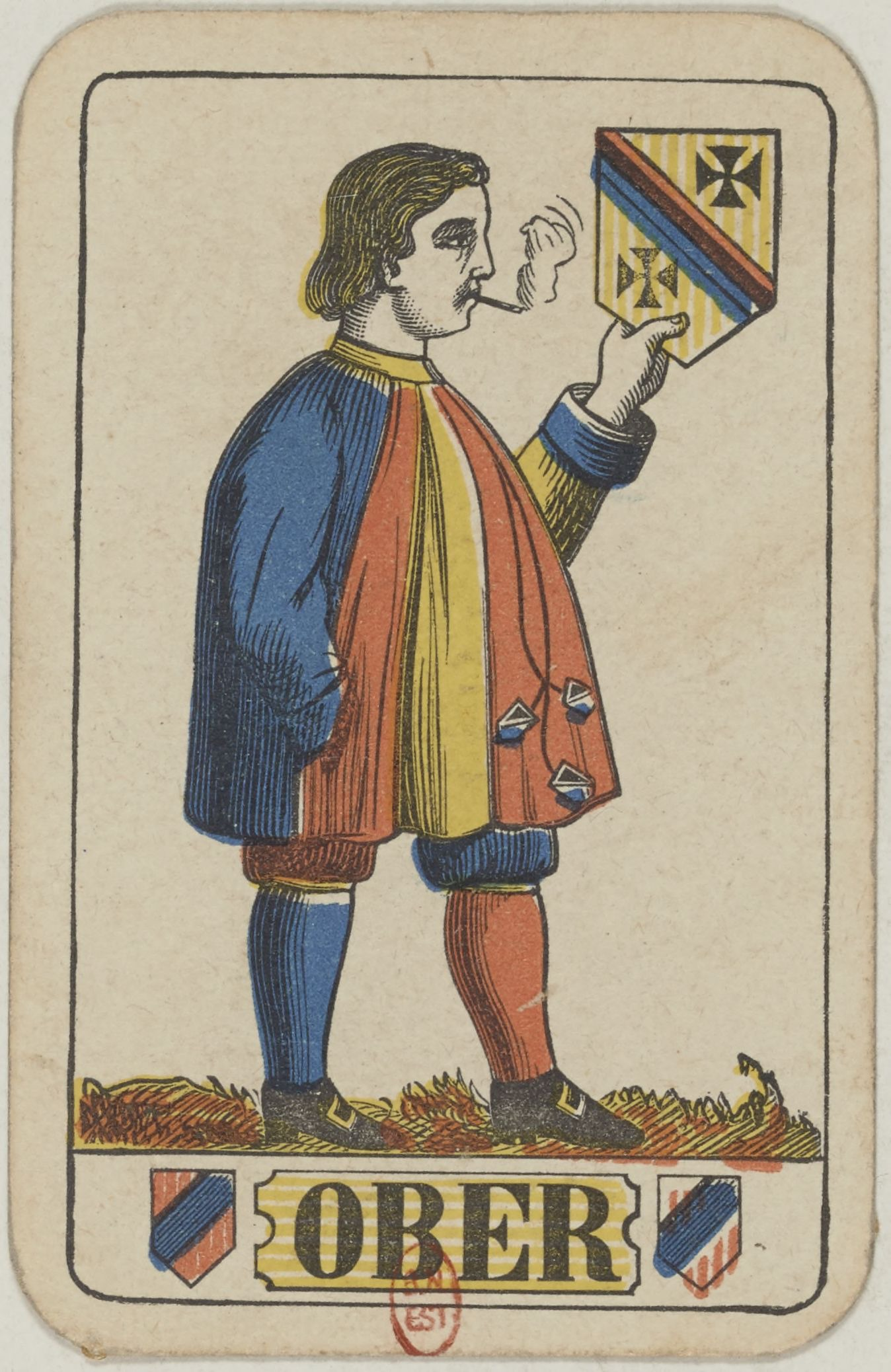
Ober

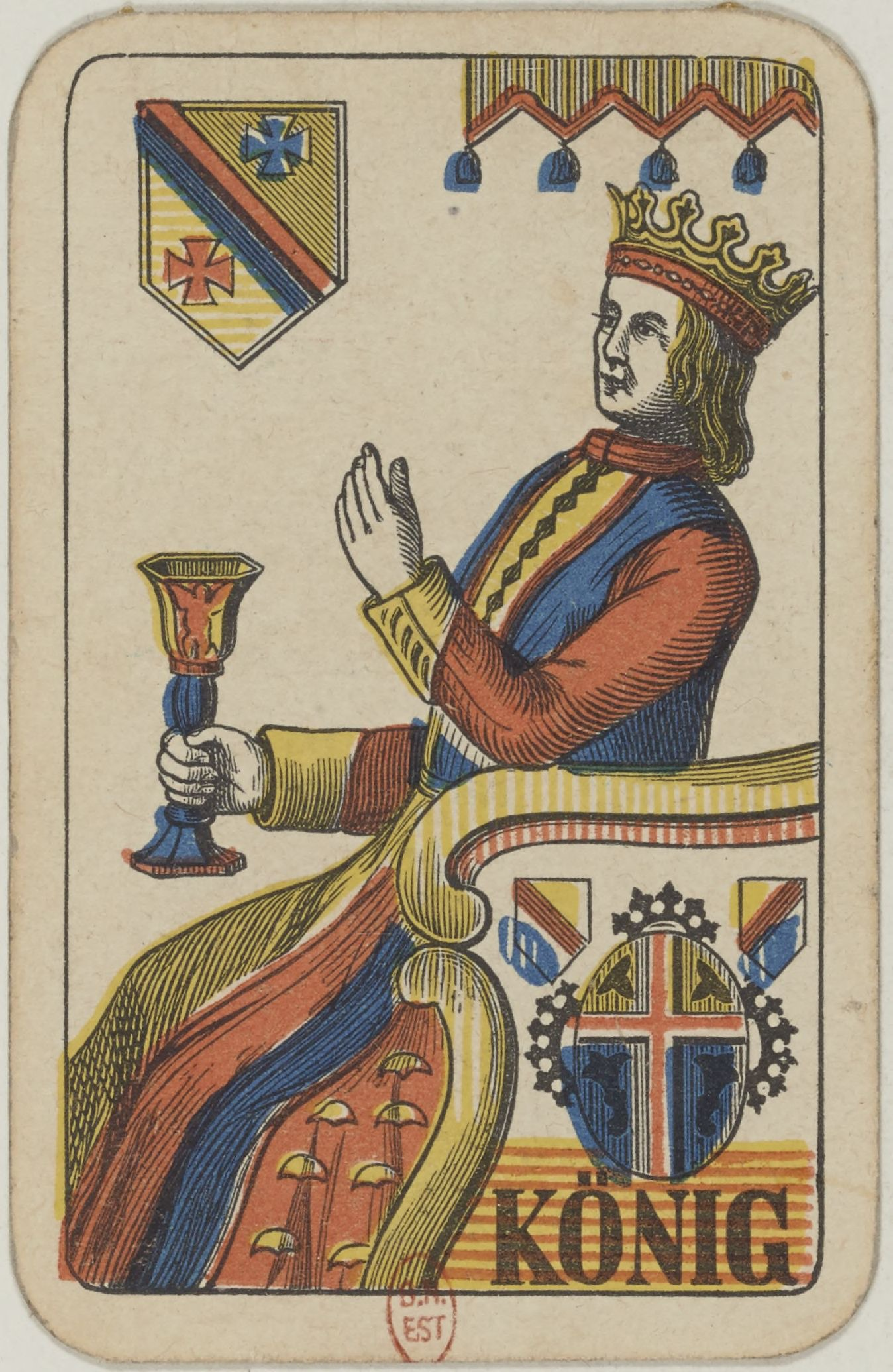
King
