= Steve Shields =

Steve Shields is the name of:

- Steve Shields (ice hockey) (born 1972), National Hockey League goaltender
- Steve Shields (baseball) (born 1958), retired American baseball player
- Steve Shields (basketball) (born 1965), head men's basketball coach at the University of Arkansas at Little Rock
