= Robert Shields =

Robert Shields may refer to:

- Robert Shields (VC) (1827–1864), Welsh recipient of the Victoria Cross
- Robert S. Shields (1845–1934), American lawyer and politician from Ohio
- Robert Shields (diarist) (1918–2007), American minister, teacher and diarist
- Sir Robert Shields (surgeon) (1930–2008), professor of surgery, Liverpool University
- Robert Shields (mime), member of mime duo Shields and Yarnell
- Robert Shields, Scottish singer who goes by the stage name ONR.
