= John Shields (cricketer) =

English cricketer (1882–1960)

Personal information
- Born: 1 February 1882; Loudoun, Ayrshire, Scotland
- Died: 11 May 1960 (aged 78); Isley Walton, Kegworth, Leicestershire, England
- Batting: Right-handed
- Role: Wicketkeeper

Domestic team information
- Years: Team
- 1906–1923: Leicestershire
- FC debut: 12 July 1906 Leicestershire v Hampshire
- Last FC: 26 June 1923 Leicestershire v Warwickshire

Career statistics
| Competition | First-class |
|---|---|
| Matches | 133 |
| Runs scored | 1401 |
| Batting average | 8.19 |
| 100s/50s | 0/2 |
| Top score | 63 |
| Catches/stumpings | 177/59 |
- Source: CricketArchive, 18 September 2013

John Shields (1 February 1882 – 11 May 1960) was an English cricketer who played first-class cricket for Leicestershire between 1906 and 1923. He was born in Loudoun, Ayrshire, Scotland and died at Isley Walton, Kegworth, Leicestershire.

Shields played as a lower-order batsman and wicketkeeper, and as an amateur, he served as official captain of Leicestershire between 1911 and 1913, as well as captaining the side on other occasions.

Shields played first for Leicestershire in 1906 and became a regular player as wicketkeeper in 1907, thereafter playing fairly regularly until the end of the 1910 season. He succeeded Sir Arthur Hazlerigg as captain for the 1911 season with an extremely poor side: Vivian Crawford, a mainstay of the batting, had departed for Sri Lanka and fast bowler Thomas Jayes was able to play only two matches because of the tuberculosis that led to his early death; in addition, Ewart Astill, the other reliable bowler of previous years, lost form so badly that he lost his place in the team. Wisden Cricketers' Almanack noted that "no one but a sanguine man of happy disposition could have gone through the season at all complacently". In 24 first-class matches, Leicestershire lost 18 times and gained just a single victory, though they did not finish bottom of the County Championship because Somerset's record was even worse. The single victory was one of the sensational matches of the season: Yorkshire, in the match after Wilfred Rhodes' benefit match, were shot out for just 47 by John King's left-arm medium pace and Leicestershire won by an innings.

Leicestershire's record in 1912 and 1913 was marginally better, although in both seasons they lost more matches than any other side. Shields appears to have been a cheerful captain: Wisden noted again in its review of the 1913 season that he "again faced a somewhat thankless task in the best possible spirit". He missed some matches in 1913, being replaced as wicketkeeper by Tom Sidwell, and at the end of the season he resigned the captaincy. He played only two more matches for Leicestershire, one each in 1914 and 1923.

Shields' career figures do not indicate any exceptional talent as a cricketer, and his two innings of more than 50 came very late in his first-class career and failed to raise his overall batting average into double figures. In 1912, he scored 54, batting at No 10, against Nottinghamshire, which merely served to narrow the margin of an innings defeat. A year later, he made 63 in the match against Hampshire, and this was his highest first-class score. Aside from appearing for Leicestershire, Shields made two appearances in consecutive matches at The Oval and Lord's for the Gentlemen in the Gentlemen v Players fixtures of 1909, and twice appeared for "An England XI", once against the 1909 Australians in a game at Blackpool and once at the end of the 1913 season against Yorkshire; in neither case was the selection particularly near Test class, though the 1909 team almost achieved an unexpected victory until Victor Trumper hit 150 in 115 minutes to save the match.
