= John Rhodin =

Former Canadian Basketball Player and Coach

Personal information
- Born: Calgary, Alberta Canada
- Listed height: 5 ft 11 in (1.80 m)
- Listed weight: 160 lb (73 kg)

Career information
- High school: Dr. E.P. Scarlett High School; Calgary, Alberta
- College: Calgary (1980–1985)
- Position: Point guard
- Number: 10

Career highlights
- Canadian University ("CIAU") Second-team All-Canadian (1985); 3× Canada West Conference Second-team All-star (1983, 1984, 1985)

John Rhodin is a former Canadian basketball player and coach. His accomplishments including being a Canadian University ("CIAU") All-Canadian and a three-time Canada West Conference All-star.

== University career ==
Before university, Rhodin played for Dr. E.P. Scarlett High School.

Rhodin was a five-year starting point guard for the University of Calgary. In the 1984–85 season, Rhodin was named as a CIAU All-Canadian. Rhodin was also a three-time second-team Canada West All-star. Rhodin also received recognition in other inter-university tournaments: he was named MVP of the Wesman Classic in Winnipeg (1984); to the all-tournament team in the Calgary Classic three times (1982, 1984, 1985); and as a tournament all-star in the Klondike Classic in Edmonton (1983), the Brandon tournament (1983), the Iron Man Saskatoon (1982) and the CIAU pre-season tournament in Toronto (1984).

Under Rhodin's leadership, Calgary performed well: in the 1980–81 season, Calgary finished second in the Canada West conference; in the 1982–83 season, Calgary again finished second in Canada West and were CIAU regional finalists; in the 1983–84 season, Calgary again reached the CIAU regional tournament and were Canada West semifinalists; and in Rhodin's final season (1984–85), Calgary again reached the CIAU regional tournament.

=== University Statistics ===
Year	Team	GP	FG	FG%	FT	FT%	Rbds	RPG	Pts	PPG
1980-81	Calgary	20	5-29	17.2	10-13	76.9	27	1.4	20	1.0
1981-82	Calgary	20	42-114	36.8	36-55	65.5	81	4.0	120	6.0
1982-83	Calgary	10	29-80	36.2	13-22	59.1	37	3.7	71	7.1
1983-84	Calgary	9	35-82	42.7	19-25	76.0	32	3.6	89	9.9
1984-85	Calgary	10	53-132	40.2	35-43	81.4	26	2.6	141	14.1
Career	Calgary	69	164-437	37.5	113-158	71.5	203	2.9	441	6.4

== Coaching career ==
Rhodin also served as an assistant coach for the University of Calgary in 1985–86 season. Calgary again performed well under Rhodin's leadership, reaching the CIAU regional tournament and were Canada West semifinalists.

== Post-career recognition ==
In 1985, Rhodin was honored by the Calgary Booster Club, which recognizes Calgary athletes for their accomplishments.
