= Kathy Shields =

Canadian basketball player and coach

Current position
- Title: Head Coach
- Team: Team Canada

Biographical details
- Born: West Vancouver, British Columbia, Canada
- Education: University of British Columbia; Laurentian University

Playing career
- 1970–1975: University of British Columbia

Coaching career (HC unless noted)
- 1977–1978: University of Victoria (assistant)
- 1979–2001: University of Victoria
- 1981–1994: Team Canada (assistant)
- 1992–1995: Senior Women’s National Team

Head coaching record
- Overall: 320–50

Accomplishments and honors

Championships
- Canada West Universities Athletic Association championships (1979, 1980, 1981, 1982, 1984, 1985, 1986, 1991, 1994, 1995, 1996, 1997, 1998, 1999, 2000)

Awards
- Canada West Coach of the Year (1979-80, 1986-87, 1991-92, 1992-93, 1994-95, 1996-97, 1997-98, 2000-01); CIAU/CIS Coach of the Year (1979-80, 1991-92)

Kathy Shields CM (née Williams) is a Canadian basketball coach. She coached the University of Victoria women’s basketball team and the 1984 Summer Olympics as an assistant coach. She is married to Ken Shields.

== Career ==
=== Playing career ===
Shields played basketball at the University of British Columbia and Laurentian University. She won back-to-back CIAU Championship titles with Laurentian in 1974 and 1975. She was also an international basketball player for Team Canada, and she competed at the 1971 FIBA World Championship for Women, 1971 Pan American Games, and 1973 Summer Universiade. After suffering a back injury, Shields was forced to retire at the age of 25.

=== Coaching career ===
Shields was part of the Canadian national women’s coaching staff at the Pan Am Games, Goodwill Games, and the 1984 Summer Olympics in Los Angeles. In 1986, Shields was certified as a Master Coach in 1986 by the Canadian Association of Coaches. She also served as head coach during the 1993 FIBA Americas Championship for Women.

In 1995, Shields resigned in protest as the Canadian Senior Women’s National Team Head Coach due to Basketball Canada withdrawing a promise to fund a centralized training program leading up to the 1996 Atlanta Olympics. In 1997, Shields and her husband Ken temporarily moved to Japan to assist the Japanese Basketball Program create a viable Junior Women's National Team.

Alongside her husband, Shields coached the University of Victoria Vikes women's basketball team. She amassed a career record of 320–50, and eight CIS Coach of the Year Awards, before requesting medical leave after being diagnosed with breast cancer. As head coach, she led the women's basketball team to 14 Canada West Universities Athletic Association championships. Shields was also head coach of the Canadian Senior Women’s National Basketball Team for four years from in 1992 to 1995. In 2002, she was inducted into UVic Sports Hall of Fame. The next year she was honoured with the 2003 Commemorative Medal for the Golden Jubilee.

In 2008, uSports renamed their Rookie of the year award to Kathy Shields Award. She was also the recipient of an Order of British Columbia. In 2011, Shields was the recipient of the Jean-Marie De Koninck Coaching Excellence Award. Three years later, she was inducted into Canada's Sports Hall of Fame. In 2015, Shields and her husband were awarded honorary law degrees from the University of Victoria.

In 2016, Shields was appointed a Member of the Order of Canada. Two years later, she was invested into the Order of Canada. In 2019, she was inducted into the Canada West Hall of Fame.

== Awards and honors ==
- Canada West Hall of Fame - 2019 Inductee
- Class of 2002 Victoria Vikes Hall of Fame Inductee
- 1998-99 Peter Ennis Award Awarded to the U Sports women's basketball Coach of the Year
- 1991-92 Peter Ennis Award:
- 1979-80 Peter Ennis Award:
