= Tracie McAra =

Canadian basketball player

Personal information
- Nationality: Canadian
- Born: 20 November 1960 (age 64) Victoria, British Columbia, Canada

Sport
- Sport: Basketball

Tracie McAra (born 20 November 1960) is a Canadian basketball player. She competed in the women's tournament at the 1984 Summer Olympics.

== Awards and honors ==
- Top 100 U Sports women's basketball Players of the Century (1920-2020).
