= Mick Shields =

Scottish rugby league footballer (1912-1983)

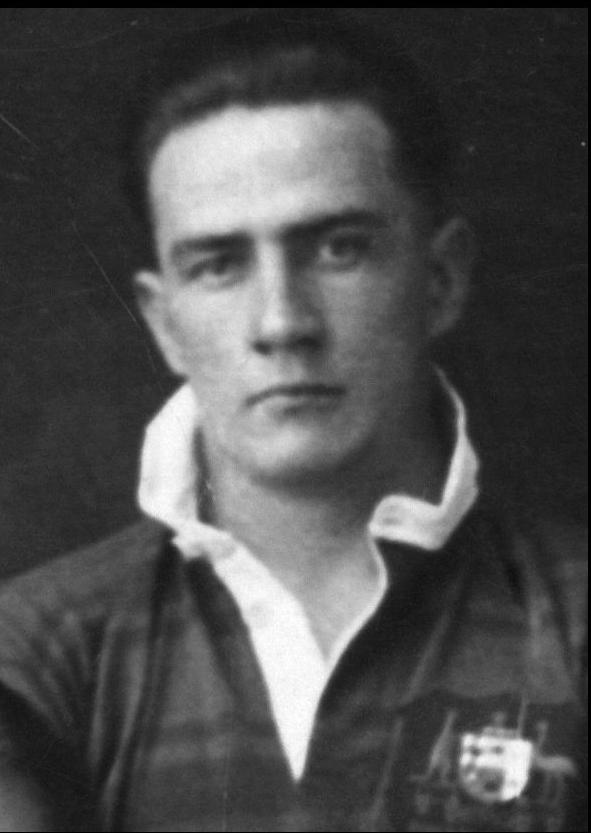
- Mick wearing the Australian hooped design jumper in a team photograph of 1935

Personal information
- Born: 23 October 1912 Cowdenbeath, Fife, Scotland
- Died: 12 February 1983 (aged 70)

Playing information
- Position: Hooker
Club
Years	Team	Pld	T	G	FG	P
1936	Western Suburbs	4	1			3
Representative
Years	Team	Pld	T	G	FG	P
1935	New South Wales	4	2	0	0	6

Mick Shields (1912–1983) was an Australian rugby league footballer who played in the 1920s and 1930s. He commenced his career with Kurri Kurri Juniors in the late 1920s and in 1935 went on to be selected to play for the Australian team to tour New Zealand.

== Life and club and representative career ==
Mick was born in 1912 at Cowdenbeath, Scotland to Michael and Mary Shields (née O'Neill). In 1915 the family emigrated to Australia to live in the small mining town of Kurri Kurri in New South Wales. He commenced his football career in his teens with Kurri Juniors and progressed in 1933 to play in Kurri's 1st grade team. In 1934, at the age of 21, Mick relocated and went to play for Quirindi 1st Grade in the area now classified as the Group 4 Rugby League competition.

In 1935 he was chosen in a number of Country Regional Representative teams to eventually be selected in the New South Wales team to play 3 games against Queensland. Mick, at the age of 22, was then selected in the Australian team as a second hooker to tour New Zealand from which he played 2 games, but no tests.

In 1936 he joined Western Suburbs Magpies in the Sydney competition and was selected in the representative City Seconds Team to play Country Seconds and a Sydney Representative team. Early in this season he sustained a knee injury that eventually became a career-ending injury.

In 1937 he relocated to play with South Newcastle in the Newcastle Rugby League competition. Mick, at the age of 26, eventually retired as a player in 1939.

== Post-playing career ==
From 1940 to 1950, he continued his involvement with Rugby League in a coaching and development role for various periods of time at Belmont Rugby League (later to become Lakes United) and at the Cessnock Goannas.

In 1951, he hosted, on radio station 2CK Cessnock, a Newcastle Rugby League Weekly Commentary and News Report. In 1972, Shields retired as an Engineer in the Coal Mining Industry and returned to live at Kurri Kurri where he was an active member and committeeman of the Kurri Kurri Bowling Club.

Shields was the first Rugby League International that had commenced his career with the Kurri Kurri Club and was remembered in 2010 for this achievement by being selected in the Kurri Kurri Rugby League Team of the century. Other ex Kurri Kurri Internationals in this team were Rees Duncan Jnr. who represented Australia in 1952, Bill Hamilton in 1973, Eddie Lumsden in 1959–1963, Jack Lumsden in 1952, Jeff Masterman in 1981, John Sattler in 1967-1969-1971, Gary Sullivan in 1970-1972 and Noel White in 1946.
