= Ken Shields (basketball) =

Canadian basketball coach

Biographical details
- Born: December 7, 1945 (age 80); Beaverlodge, Alberta, Canada

Playing career
- 1964–1965: Mount Royal College
- 1965–1967: University of Calgary
- 1967–1969: University of British Columbia

Coaching career (HC unless noted)
- 1969–1970: UBC Women's (co-coach)
- 1971–1977: Laurentian University
- 1978–1989: University of Victoria
- 1990–1994: Canada men's national basketball team
- 2004: Australia men's national basketball team (assistant)
- 2007: Georgia men's national basketball team
- 2010: Great Britain women's national basketball team (assistant)

Head coaching record
- Overall: 387–144 (.729) (men's university statistics)

Accomplishments and honors

Championships
- 7× CIAU championships; 10× Canada West championships

Awards
- As a coach: 4× CIAU coach of the year; 3× Canada West coach of the year; Order of Canada; Recipient of Canada Basketball's John Naismith Award (2007); Canada Sports Hall of Fame Inductee (2009); Canada Basketball Hall of Fame Inductee (1999); BC Basketball Hall of Fame Inductee (2013); UVic Sports Hall of Fame Inductee (2002); Greater Victoria Sports Hall of Fame Inductee (2003); As a player: WCIAA All-Star (1967)

Kenneth William Daniel Shields CM (born December 7, 1945) is a former Canadian basketball coach. He is a four-time CIAU coach of the year recipient. When he retired from university coaching, he held the most wins in Canadian university men's basketball history, during which time he won a record 7-straight national championships with the University of Victoria. He is also the former head coach of the Canada men's national team.

== University ==
Shields began his coaching career in the 1969–1970 season with the UBC women's basketball team while completing his master's degree. This team won the Canadian Senior A women's championship that year.

The following season, Shields became the head coach of the Laurentian University's men's program, where he coached for the next six years. While there, Shields was awarded his first CIAU coach of the year award (1976).

After his time at Laurentian, Shields became the head coach of the University of Victoria's men's program, where he coached for the next thirteen years (1978-1989). While with UVic, Shields won a record 7 consecutive CIAU national championships (1980-1986). When he retired from university coaching in 1989, he held the most wins as a coach in Canadian university men's basketball history.

While coaching at UVic, Shields was named the CIAU coach of the year on three more occasions (1979, 1982, 1983), bringing his total coach of the year awards to four. During UVic's seven-run national championship run under Shields, the program produced six CIAU MVPs, eight CIAU All-Stars and nine All-Canadians. Shields and UVic reached the CIAU finals in nine of his last eleven years as head coach.

In his thirteen years as head coach at Victoria, Victoria won ten Canada West championships. During three of these seasons (1978–89, 1982–83, 1983–84), UVic went undefeated in regular season and playoff play. Shields was named the Canada West coach of the year on three occasions (1979, 1983, 1986).

== National / Professional Teams ==
Shields coached the junior national team through the 1980s during major events, including two world championships. From 1990 to 1994, Shields served as the head coach of the Canadian national men's team, where in 1994 he led Canada to a 7th-place finish in the FIBA World Championship.

Shields also served as the Canadian national team program director from 1989 to 1994 and received a Master Coach certificate from the Coaching Association of Canada.

After his time with Canada Basketball, Shields coached professionally in Tokyo for two seasons, along with coaching their national team. Shields served as an assistant coach for the Australian senior men's team during the 2004 Summer Olympics. In 2006, Shields was a consultant to the Milwaukee Bucks.

In 2007, Shields was the head coach of the Georgian men's national team. In 2010, he was an assistant coach with the Great Britain women's national team.

== Post-career ==
Shields was appointed to the Order of Canada (invested in 1999). He was inducted into the Canada Sports Hall of Fame (2009), the Canada Basketball Hall of Fame (1999), the Canada West Hall of Fame (2019–20 induction class), the BC Sports Hall of Fame (2013), the University of Victoria Sports Hall of Fame (2002) and the Greater Victoria Sports Hall of Fame (2003). In 2007, he was awarded the James Naismith Award by Canada Basketball for significant lifelong contribution to basketball in Canada.

Additionally, the 1979 to 1986 UVic men's teams were inducted into the Canada West Hall of Fame (2019–20 induction class); the 1979–80 UVic team was inducted into the BC Sports Hall of Fame (2020); the 1982-83 UVic team was inducted into the UVic Sports Hall of Fame (2023); and the 1969–70 UBC women's team was inducted into the UBC Sports Hall of Fame (1993), with Shields being recognized as coach in all of these team inductions.

Further, being disillusioned as a student that there was not a university program to study coaching, Shields was instrumental in establishing the University of Victoria's National Coaching Institute. He was also the founding president of the Commonwealth Centre for Sport Development.

In 1993, the first "Ken Shields basketball, academics & community service award" was presented to a Canadian male university basketball athlete.

Shields also developed the High Performance Training Centres for rowing, soccer and middle-distance running at the University of Victoria. He also served as a committee member for hosting the Commonwealth Games in Victoria.

== Student Athlete ==
Shields' family moved to Prince Rupert, British Columbia for his grade 11 year. He tried out for the high school basketball team, only to become the manager of the B team. This year, he played in the community league and improved so much as to make the A team the following year. His high school team won the provincial high school championship that year.

Shields played at Mount Royal College, two seasons at the University of Calgary (1965–1967) and then two seasons at the University of British Columbia (1967–1969). He was named a WCIAA All-Star in 1967 while playing for Calgary. It is reported that Shields "later was on the radar of Jack Donohue's national team."

== Personal life ==
Shields was born on December 7, 1945, in Beaverlodge, Alberta and is described as a "Prince Rupert, B.C. native". He is married to Kathy Shields, the legendary coach of the women's UVic basketball program. Together, Ken and Kathy Shields have won a combined 15 national championships with their respective UVic teams. They met while Ken was coaching the women's team at UBC in 1969–70.

In university, Shields realized he wanted to coach; however, given the lack of a coaching program, he studied Physical Education and used that training in his coaching career.

Preceded by Jack Donohue	Canada men's national basketball team head coach 1989–1994	Succeeded by Steve Konchalski
