= Victoria Vikes =

University athletic team in Canada

- University: University of Victoria
- Nickname: Vikes
- Association: U Sports
- Conference: Canada West; BCIHL; NAIA independents
- Athletic director: Clint Hamilton
- Location: Victoria, BC
- Varsity teams: 9
- Basketball arena: CARSA
- Ice hockey arena: Ian Stewart Rink
- Soccer stadium: Centennial Stadium
- Lacrosse stadium: Artificial Fields
- Outdoor track and field venue: Centennial Stadium
- Colors: Blue and Gold
- Website: govikesgo.com
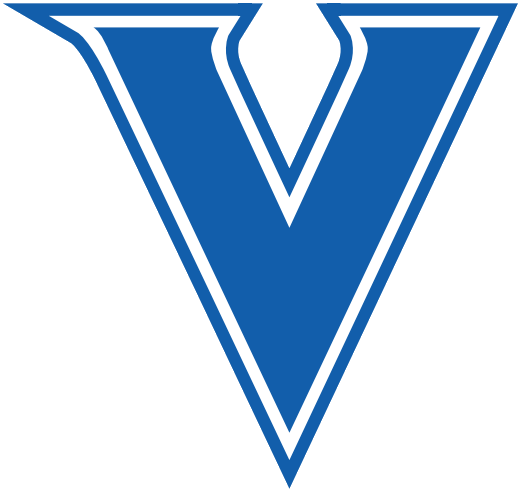

The Victoria Vikes are the athletic teams that represent the University of Victoria of Victoria, British Columbia, Canada in both men's and women's U Sports. Vikes was previously a longstanding nickname for both the men's teams (previously the Vikings) and women's teams (previously the Vikettes) until it was officially adopted as the teams' name in 1989.

== Varsity teams ==
The Vikes have both men's and women's varsity teams in the following sports:

Men's sports	Women's sports
Basketball	Basketball
Golf	Field hockey
Rowing	Golf
Rugby	Rowing
Soccer	Rugby
Swimming	Soccer
Cross Country	Swimming
Track and field	Cross Country
	Track and field

== Club teams ==
The Vikes operate a club men's hockey team that competes in the British Columbia Intercollegiate Hockey League.

== Facilities ==
Victoria's athletics facilities include:

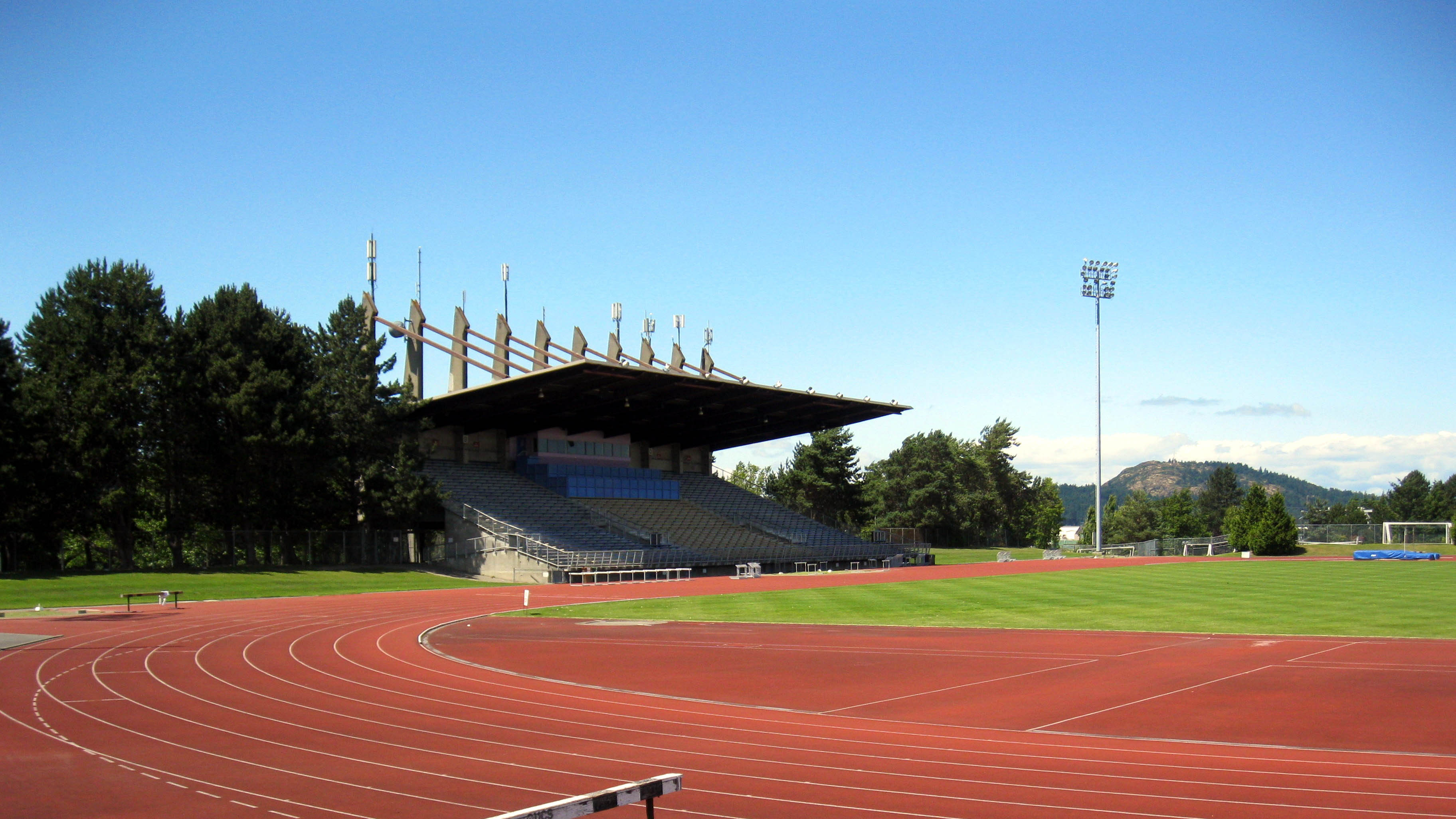
Centennial Stadium

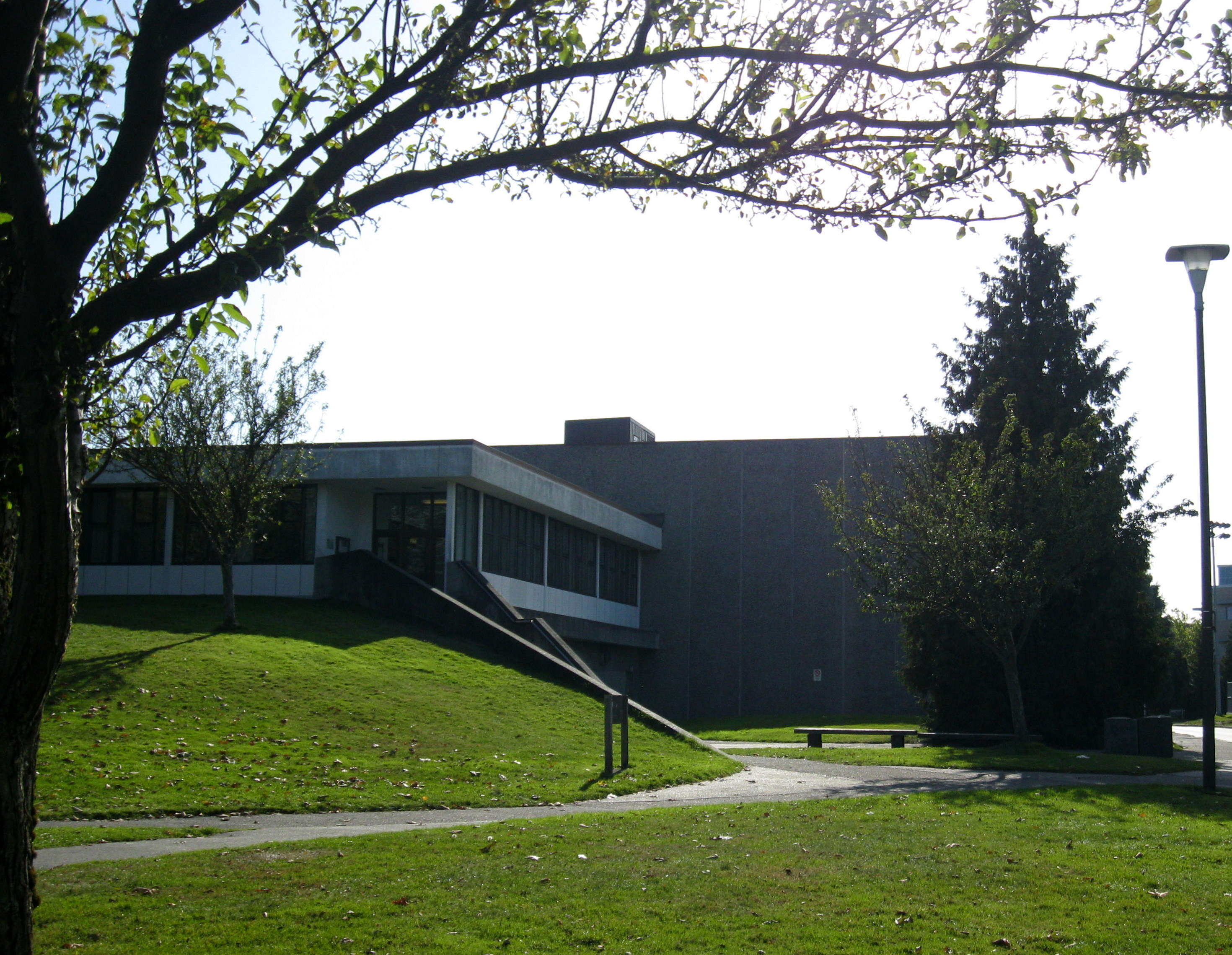
McKinnon Building

Venue	Sport(s)
Centennial Stadium	Soccer
Centennial Stadium	Track and field
CARSA (Note: Acronym for "Centre for Athletics, Recreation and Special Abilities".)	Basketball
Field Hockey Turf	Field hockey
McKinnon Building and Gym	Basketball
McKinnon Building and Gym	Swimming
Wallace Field	Rugby union
Artificial Fields	(various) (Note: Soccer, field hockey, lacrosse, and other outdoor sports.)
Ian Stewart Rink	Ice hockey

== Championships ==
=== U Sports Championships ===
Sport	Titles	Winning years
Basketball (men's)	9	1979–80, 1980–81, 1981–82, 1982–83, 1983–84, 1984–85, 1985–86, 1996–97, 2024–25
Basketball (women's)	9	1979–80, 1980–81, 1981–82, 1984–85, 1986–87, 1991–92, 1997–98, 1999–00, 2002–03
Cross country (men's)	5	1994, 1995, 1996, 1997, 2015
Cross country (women's)	11	1980, 1985, 1986, 1987, 1994, 1998, 1999, 2000, 2001, 2025, 2026
Field Hockey (women's)	17	1984, 1987, 1989, 1991, 1992, 1994, 1995, 1997, 2000, 2002, 2008, 2018, 2019, 2021, 2022, 2023, 2024
Soccer (men's)	6	1975, 1987, 1996, 2004, 2011, 2026
Soccer (women's)	1	2005

=== Canadian University National Championships ===
Sport	Titles	Winning years
Golf (men's)	3	2003, 2005, 2006
Golf (women's)	1	2008
Rowing (women's)	11	1997, 1998, 1999, 2000, 2001, 2002, 2003, 2005, 2010, 2011, 2012
Rowing (men's)	7	1997, 1998, 2000, 2001, 2009, 2010, 2021
Rugby (men's)	3	1997–98, 1998–99, 2019–20
Rugby 7s (men's)	5	2011, 2013, 2014, 2015, 2016
Rugby 7s (women's)	2	2017, 2019

== Awards and honors ==
=== Canada West Hall of Fame ===
- Kathy Shields: Canada West Hall of Fame - 2019 Inductee
- Nicci Wright, Soccer: Canada West Hall of Fame - 2019 Inductee
- Victoria Vikettes, Basketball: Canada West Hall of Fame - 2019 Inductee

== Rivalries ==
=== UBC ===
As the two oldest universities in the province, the University of Victoria and the University of British Columbia (UBC) have long been fierce rivals in sports and athletics, including in rowing, rugby, and soccer. The UVic Vikes and UBC Thunderbirds rivalry is a symbol of good sportsmanship. The "Annual UBC I UVic Soccer Classic" is one of the largest university sporting events in Canada and pits the UBC Men's Soccer Team against the UVic Men's Soccer Team. The annual classic alternates between the UVic Centennial Stadium and the UBC Thunderbird Stadium.

Vikes Nation fans and UBC Thunderbird fans pack into the Centennial stadium for the classic, with the UVic Cheerleaders and Marching Band also present. In 2015, UVic also constructed a new and expanded Athletics Facility (CARSA) which includes a major auditorium/gymnasium for Vikes Basketball Teams, and significantly more seating, stands, and court facilities.
