= History of Lethbridge =

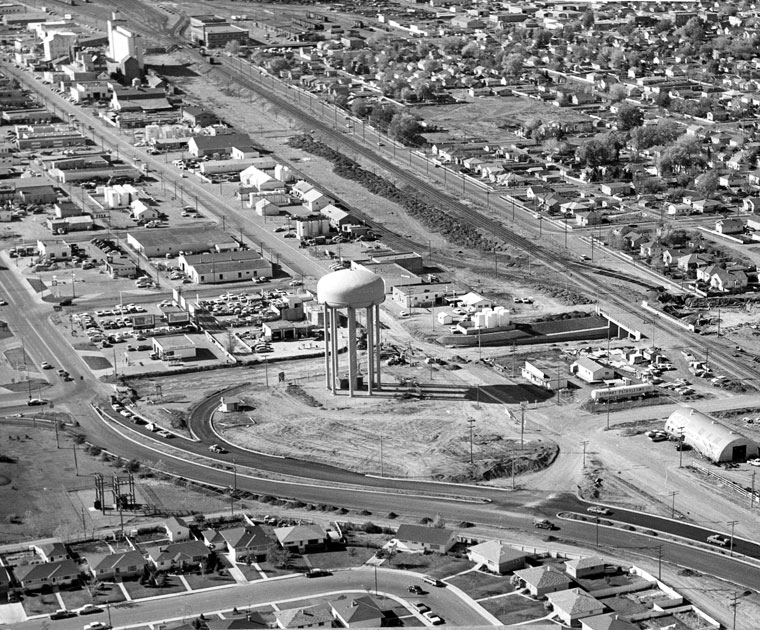
An aerial view of Lethbridge from 1963.

The modern history of Lethbridge extends to the mid-19th century, when the area was developed from drift mines opened by Nicholas Sheran in 1874, and the North Western Coal and Navigation Company in 1882. Prior to the development of drift mines in the area, Lethbridge, Alberta was known as Coal Banks, and was part of the territory of the Blackfoot Confederacy. The Confederacy was made up of the Kainai Nation, the Northern Peigan, the Southern Peigan (Blackfeet), and the Siksika Nation.

== 19th century ==
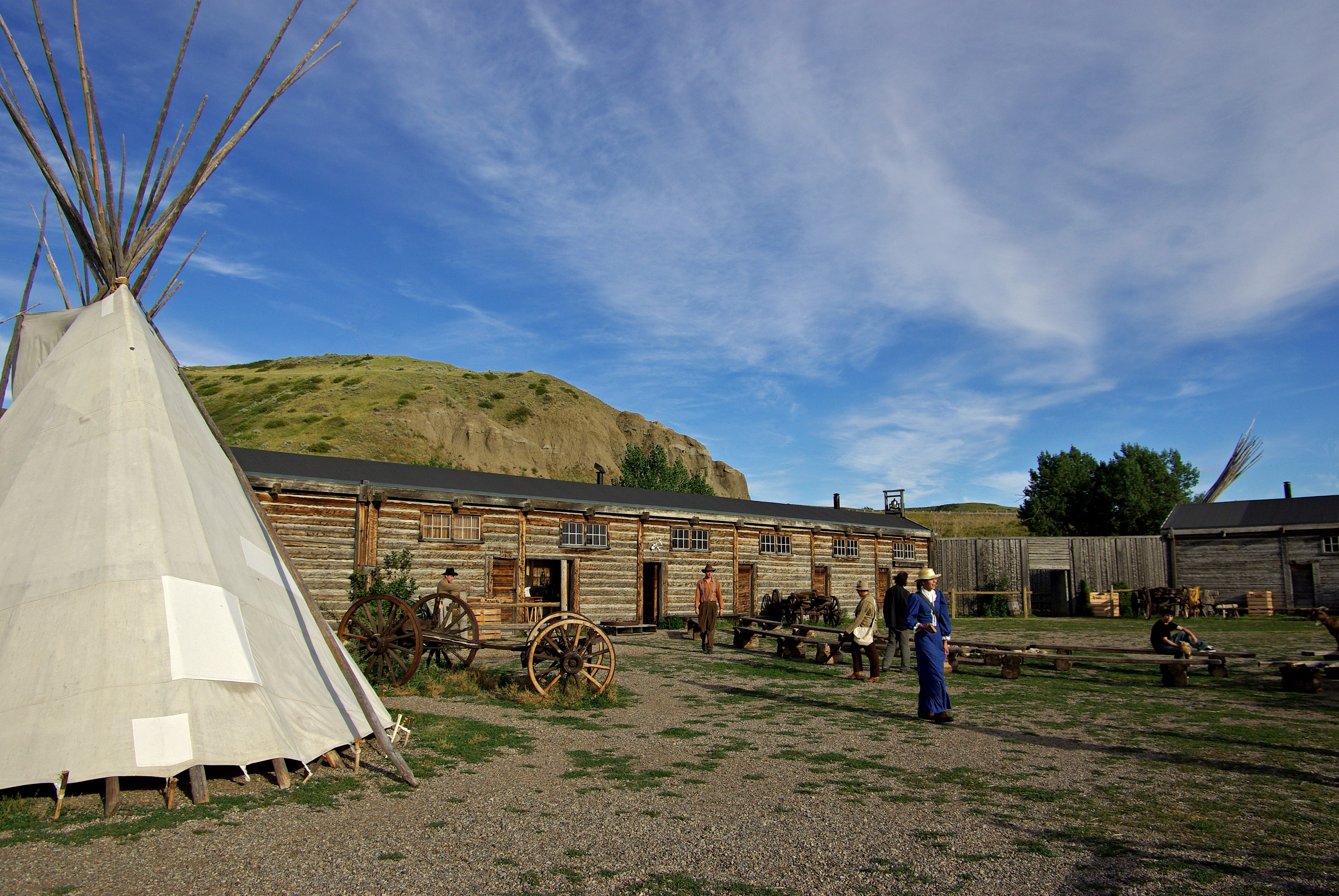
Fort Whoop-Up, a whiskey trading post, was established in 1869 after the United States Army outlawed alcohol trade with the Kainai Nation in Montana.

After the United States Army outlawed alcohol trading in 1869 with the Blood nation in Montana, traders John J. Healy and Alfred B. Hamilton started the whisky trading post Fort Hamilton near the junction of the St. Mary and Oldman rivers. It was burned down, but they rebuilt it and eventually it came to be nicknamed Fort Whoop-Up. The whisky traded at this post was often not much more than alcohol, river water, chewing tobacco and lye.

The whisky trade eventually led to the massacre of many Assiniboines in the Cypress Hills area by some Americans in 1873. As a result, the North-West Mounted Police (now the RCMP) were established, and a contingent travelled to southern Alberta to stop the trade and establish order. The NWMP arrived at Fort Whoop-Up on 9 October 1874. Later in 1875, the NWMP established a post at Fort Whoop-up by renting a room from Healy and Hamilton. For the next twelve years, the fort continued to trade (although not in "whisky") while also hosting a NWMP post.

=== Coal mining ===
By the 1870s, Nicholas Sheran (an American entrepreneur) mined a coal seam in the coulees on the west side of what is now the Oldman River. He sold what he mined to Montana traders and the NWMP.

Sir Alexander Tilloch Galt was interested in the success Sheran was having. He knew a transcontinental railway was soon to be built in the area, and the settlers it would bring would create a profitable market for the coal.

On 13 October 1882, Galt's company North Western Coal and Navigation Company opened the first drift mine across from Sheran's operation. This mine was managed by William Stafford. The first president and largest shareholder of the company, William Lethbridge, was the one after whom the town was named.

== 20th century ==
By the start of the 20th century, the mines employed about 150 men and produced about 300 tonnes of coal each day. By the time production peaked during World War I, 10 mines employed 2,000 miners and produced 1 million tonnes of coal annually. At the time, Lethbridge area collieries were the largest coal producers in the Northwest Territories.

After the war, an increase in oil and natural gas production caused a decline in coal production, and the last mine in Lethbridge closed in 1957. Some of this mine, Galt No. 8, still stands today, and a local society is attempting to renovate it as a museum or interpretive centre.

=== Rail ===
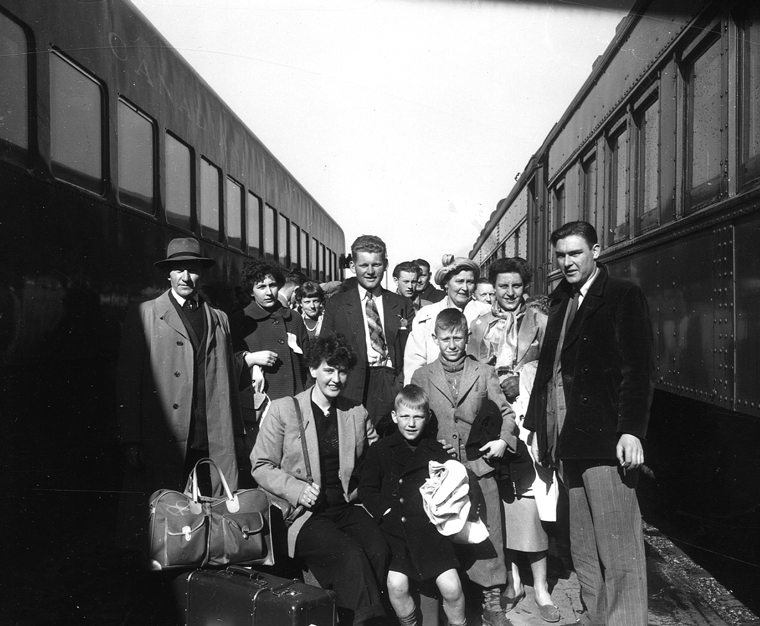
Immigrants arrive at Lethbridge station in 1953. Passenger rail service continued to the city until 1971.

The first rail line was built in Lethbridge, being completed 28 August 1885 by the Alberta Railway and Coal Company. The line was further extended 595 kilometres beyond Lethbridge and was instrumental in feeding the main CPR lines at the time the ARCC sold it to the CPR in 1912. Because of the rail industry's dependence of coal and the CPR's efforts to settle immigrants in southern Alberta, the railway centre of Lethbridge was instrumental in the economic success of the region. In the mid-1980s, the railyards in downtown Lethbridge were moved to nearby Kipp and Lethbridge ceased operating as a hub for rail traffic.

=== Riot of 1907 ===
On 25 December 1907, an altercation occurred at the Dallas Hotel (now the Coalbanks Inn) on 5 Street South in downtown Lethbridge. Reportedly, the altercation was between a Chinese employee working the hotel's restaurant and a Caucasian customer.

Word of the altercation spread and somehow escalated into rumours the employee had killed the customer. As a result, a large crowd gathered at the hotel and ransacked the restaurant. Shortly after, they moved to nearby Chinatown to wreak havoc there.

At this point, the local police gathered to control the situation and mayor W. S. Galbraith read the Riot Act to those gathered. As a result, everything was brought under control and the crowd soon dispersed.

=== Development ===
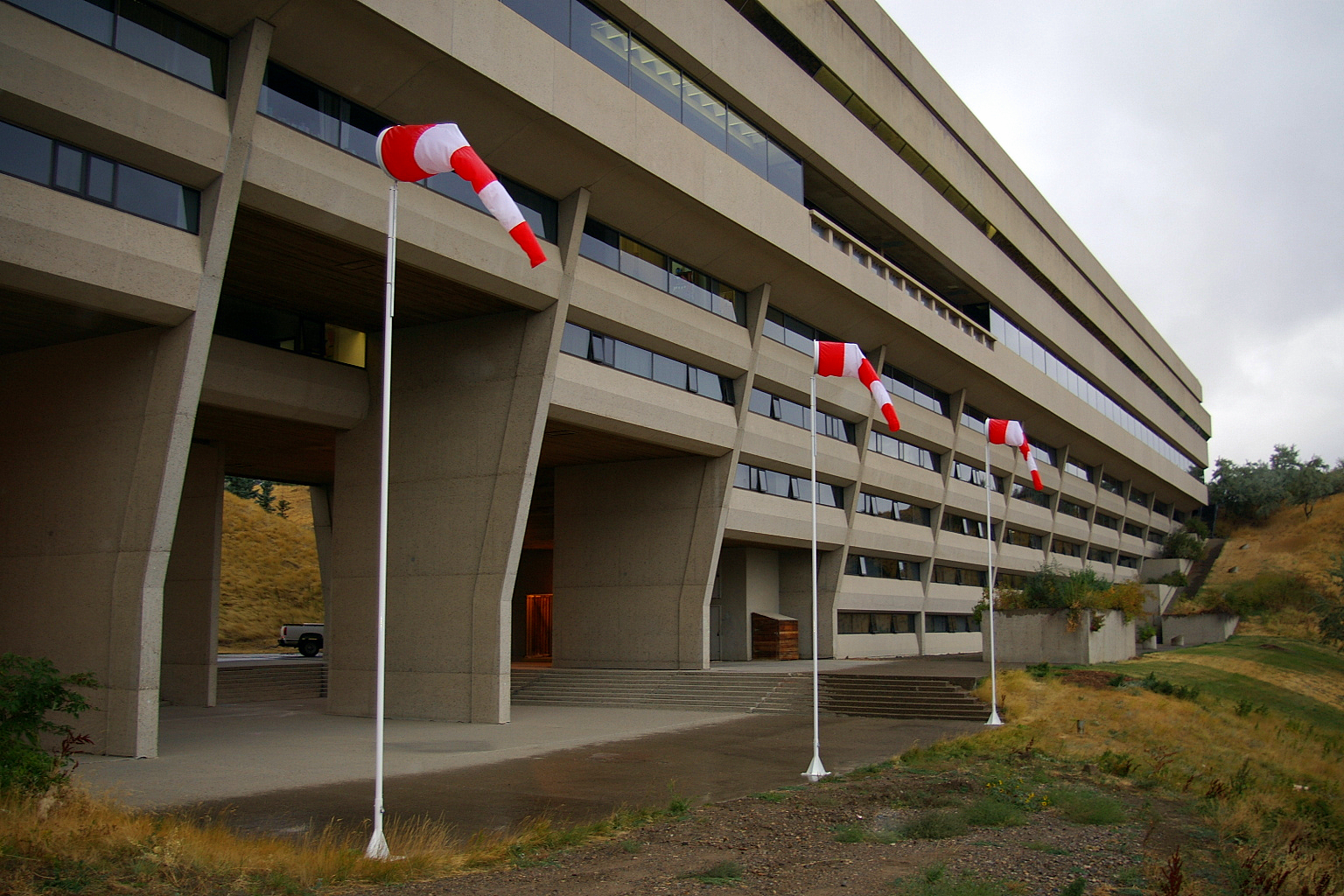
The University of Lethbridge was established in 1967, one of two post-secondary institutions established in Lethbridge after World War II.

After the CPR moved the divisional point of its Crowsnest Line from Fort Macleod to Lethbridge in 1905, the city became a regional centre for Southern Alberta; something the region did not have previously. Between 1907 and 1913, a development boom occurred in Lethbridge, making it the main marketing, distribution and service centre in southern Alberta. Several municipal projects, a construction boom, and rising real estate prices transformed the mining town into a significant city.

Part of the impetus behind the municipal projects above was the city playing host to the 7th International Dry-Farming Congress in 1912. As recently as 1911, the city had no facilities to host an event of this significance. By the time the event arrived in October, the city had spent $1.35 million paving downtown streets, putting in cement sidewalks, improving the water and sewer systems, building a street railcar system, creating Henderson Park and setting aside 60 acres (24 ha) for the Exhibition Grounds. Despite the event attracting thousands of delegates from throughout Canada and such places as China, Italy, and India, the city's tax base of only 8,000 could not support those improvements. The city carried the debt for decades after. Even so, the Lethbridge Herald labelled the event as "the greatest week in the history of the city".

Between World War I and World War II, the city experienced an economic slump. Development slowed, drought drove farmers from their farms and coal mining rapidly declined from its peak before 1920. Following WWII, irrigation in the surrounding area caused the city's population to swell, which in turn boosted the local economy. Lethbridge Community College (now Lethbridge College) opened in April 1957, and the University of Lethbridge in 1967.

== Names ==
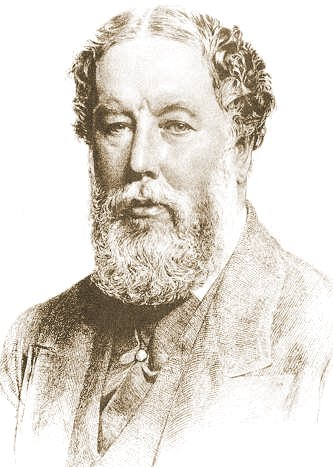
The town was named after William Lethbridge.

Before settlement, the area where Lethbridge is located was known as The Arid Region. After geological surveys around 1880 revealed an abundance of coal, it became called The Belly River Coal District. After the Galts introduced irrigation to counter the Arid Region problems around 1900, the locality became called the Irrigated District. Finally, as an aid to land sales after the rush of dryland settlement started about 1905, the non-irrigable portion was called The Winter Wheat Lands.

Other names the area was known by are as follows:

- Blackfoot
  - Aksaysim, also transliterated as Aksiiksahko or Steep Banks
  - Mek-kio-towaghs, also Miiksskoowa, variously translated as Painted Rock, Red Painted Rock, or Medicine Stone
  - Assini-etomochi, also Asinaawaiitomottsaawa, or Where We Slaughtered the Crees
  - Sik-ooh-kotok, Black/Rocks or Coal
- Sarcee
  - Chadish-kashi, Black/Rocks
- Cree
  - Kuskusukisay-guni, Black/Rocks
- Stony
  - Ipubin-saba-akabin, or Digging Coal
- English
  - Coal Banks
  - Sherans, or Sheran's Ferry
  - The Crossing
  - The Colliery
  - Newlethbridge
  - Lethbridge Colliery
  - Upper and Lower Town
  - Coalhurst
  - Riverside

Since October 15, 1885, the name Lethbridge has been the official term. The name Lethbridge was in common unofficial use for the river bottom community at least as early as May 1884.

== See also ==
- History of Alberta
