= History of Alberta =

The province of Alberta, Canada, has a history and prehistory stretching back thousands of years. The ancestors of today's First Nations in Alberta arrived in the area by at least 10,000 BC according to the Bering land bridge theory. Southerly tribes, the Plains Indians, such as the Blackfoot, Blood, and Peigans eventually adapted to seminomadic plains bison hunting, originally without the aid of horses, but later with horses that Europeans had introduced.

Recorded or written history begins with the arrival of Europeans. The rich soil was ideal for growing wheat and the vast prairie grasslands were great for raising cattle. The coming of the railways in the late 19th century led to large-scale migration of farmers and cattleman from Eastern Canada, the United States, and Europe. Wheat and cattle remain important, but the farms are much larger now and the rural population much smaller. Alberta has urbanized and its economic base has expanded from the export of wheat and beef to include the export of oil and gas as well.

== Indigenous groups ==
More northerly tribes, like the Woodland Cree and the Chipewyan also hunted, trapped, and fished for other types of game in the aspen parkland and boreal forest regions.

Later, the mixture of these native peoples with French fur traders created a new cultural group, the Métis. The Métis established themselves to the east of Alberta, but after being displaced by white settlement, many migrated to Alberta.

=== Political history of the indigenous peoples ===
Following the arrival of outside European observers it is possible to reconstruct a rough narrative history of the nations of what later became Alberta. Using later-recorded oral histories as well as archaeological and linguistic evidence, it also possible to make inferences back further in time. But in both cases the evidentiary base is thin.

It is believed that at least some parts of the Great Plains were depopulated by a prolonged period of the drought during the Medieval Warm Period (c. 950 – c. 1250). The area was repopulated once the drought subsided, by peoples from a diverse number of language families and from all parts of the North American continent. The Numic languages (for example Comanche and Shoshoni) are from the Uto-Aztecan language family and came to the Plains from the southwest. Algonquian speakers (Plains Cree, Blackfoot, Saulteaux) are originally from the northeast. The Siouxan peoples (Great Sioux, Assiniboine, Nakoda, Mandan, Crow, etc.) speak a family of languages different from both of the above, and are from southeast. There are also small offshoots of the Na-Dene languages from the far northwest found on the Plains, including the Tsuu T'ina.

==== Lodges, bands, tribes, and confederacies ====
The smallest unit of organization for both plains and subarctic people was what the European-Canadian explorers called a "lodge". A lodge was an extended family or other close-knit group who lived together in the same teepee or other dwelling. Lodges travelled together in groups which anthropologists call "bands". In the case of the Blackfoot during the historic era this would include 10 to 30 lodges, or roughly 80 to 240 persons. The band was the fundamental unit of organization on the Plains for both hunting and warfare. Bands were loose associations that could be formed and dissolved depending on circumstances, which gave their member lodges much freedom, but also less certainty. Therefore, people would also be socially bound to others in variety of other groups, such as common descent (a clan), common language and religion (a tribe), or a common age or rank (a ritual society or a warrior society, referred to in anthropology as a sodality).

Population density for both plains and subarctic peoples (as for most hunter-gatherer societies) was quite low, but distributed very differently. Plains bands could often congregate into large, pan-tribal hunting or war parties—especially once horses were available—due to the abundant supply of bison for food and the open, easily traversed landscape. As well, bands could migrate over vast distances, following the bison or for military purposes. Subarctic peoples also migrated, but in much smaller groups since the productivity of the boreal forests is so low that it cannot support any large groups in one place for long. Migrations in the subarctic would include following traplines, snowshoeing onto frozen lakes for ice fishing, searching for moose and other game, and returning to favourite berry patches.

When historians speak of political units on the Great Plains they often speak of "inter-tribal warfare" but most political decisions were not made strictly on the basis of ethnic (or tribal) identity. Most often, bands from a number of different tribes would form a semi-permanent alliance, called a confederacy by English-language observers. The pre-settlement political history of the Great Plains (and to some extent the Subarctic) is one of shifting membership in a number of large confederacies, consisting of dozens of bands from multiple tribes.

==== First recorded politics ====
An early account comes from Saukamappe (a Cree later adopted into the Peigan), who as a very old man recounted events going back as far as his youth to explorer David Thompson in the 1780s. French explorer Pierre Gaultier de Varennes, sieur de La Vérendrye made it as far west as the upper Missouri River in 1738, and his sons were also explorers of the West. Based on these and other sources it is possible to derive a rough picture of the political map of the northern Great Plains during the eighteenth century. The Eastern Shoshone were able to acquire horses from their southern linguistic cousins at an early stage, and therefore became dominant on the northern Plains. By the early 1700s their hunting range extended from the North Saskatchewan River in the north (present-day Alberta) to the Platte River in the south (Wyoming) and all along the eastern slopes of the Rocky Mountains and out onto the plains to the east. The Shoshone became extremely feared for constantly launching raids to capture more war prisoners. This earned them the hatred of all of their neighbours, and resulted in a temporary alliance between the Blackfoot Confederacy, Sarsis, Plains Crees, Assiniboines, and Gros Ventres to resist the Shoshone.

The Shoshone could not keep a monopoly on the horses, however, and soon the Blackfoot had their own, obtained through trade from the Crow, captured in raids, or bred by the Blackfoot themselves. At the same time the Blackfoot began to acquire firearms from the British Hudson's Bay Company (HBC) to the northeast, often via Cree and Assiniboine middlemen. The Peigans (and other Blackfoot) were then able to begin to push the Shoshone south of the Red Deer River by 1780. The 1780–1782 smallpox outbreak devastated both the Shoshone and Blackfoot; however, the Blackfoot used their newly acquired military superiority to launch raids on the Shoshone in which they captured large numbers of women and children, who were then forcibly assimilated into Blackfoot culture thereby increasing their numbers and reducing their enemy's. According to David Thompson, by 1787 the Blackfoot conquest of Shoshone territory was complete. The Shoshone moved across the Rockies or far to the south, and only rarely came onto the plains to hunt or trade. The Blackfoot claimed an area from the North Saskatchewan River in the north to the upper reaches of the Missouri River in the south, and from the Rockies east for 300 miles (480 km).

Blackfoot control of the sources of horses was not secure, however, and neither were their hunting grounds. From the northeast the Iron Confederacy (mostly Cree and Assiniboine but also Stoney, Saulteaux and others) were losing their position as middlemen traders as the HBC and the North West Company moved inland, and they were instead taking up horse-mounted bison hunting on the very territory the Blackfoot had recently captured from the Shoshone.

== Pre-Confederation ==
The territorial evolution of Alberta

The first Europeans to reach Alberta were the French, such as Frenchman Pierre La Vérendrye or one of his sons, who had travelled inland to Manitoba in 1730, establishing forts and trading furs directly with the native peoples there. Exploring the river system further, the French fur traders would have likely engaged the Blackfoot-speaking people directly; proof of this being that the word for "Frenchman" in the Blackfoot language means, "real white man". By the mid-eighteenth century, they were siphoning off most of the best furs before they could reach the Hudson's Bay trading posts further inland, sparking tension between the rival companies.

The first written account of present-day Alberta is by the fur trader Anthony Henday, who explored the vicinity of present-day Red Deer and Edmonton in 1754–55 in an attempt to establish direct trade between Hudson's Bay and the people of the prairies. He spent the winter with a group of Cree and met with others, likely Blackfoot. Other important early explorers of Alberta include Peter Fidler, David Thompson, Peter Pond, Alexander MacKenzie, and George Simpson. The first European settlement was founded at Fort Chipewyan by MacKenzie in 1788, although Fort Vermilion disputes this claim, having also been founded in 1788.

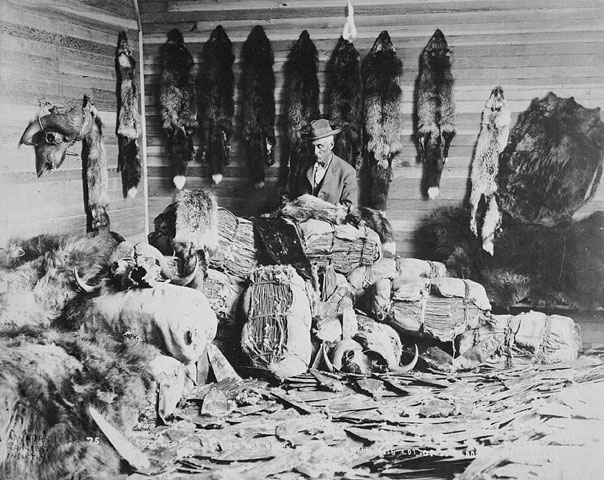
A fur trader in Fort Chipewyan in the 1890s

The early history of Alberta is closely tied to the fur trade, and the rivalries associated with it. The first battle was between English and French traders, and often took the form of open warfare. Most of central and southern Alberta is part of the Hudson Bay watershed, and in 1670 was claimed by the English Hudson's Bay Company (HBC) as part of its monopoly territory, Rupert's Land. This was contested by French traders operating from Montreal, the coureurs des bois. When France's power on the continent was crushed after the fall of Quebec in 1759, the British HBC was left with unfettered control of the trade, and exercised its monopoly powers.

This was soon challenged in the 1770s by the North West Company (NWC), a private Montreal-based company that hoped to recreate the old French trading network in the waters that did not drain to the Hudson Bay, such as the Mackenzie River, and waters draining to the Pacific Ocean. Many of Alberta's cities and towns started as either HBC or NWC trading posts, including Fort Edmonton. The HBC and NWC eventually merged in 1821, and in 1870 the new HBC's trade monopoly was abolished and trade in the region was opened to any entrepreneur. Although the process of transferring Rupert's Land and the North-Western Territory to the Dominion of Canada began much earlier, the current land of Alberta then became a part of the North-West Territories as part of the Rupert's Land Act 1868 on July 15, 1870.

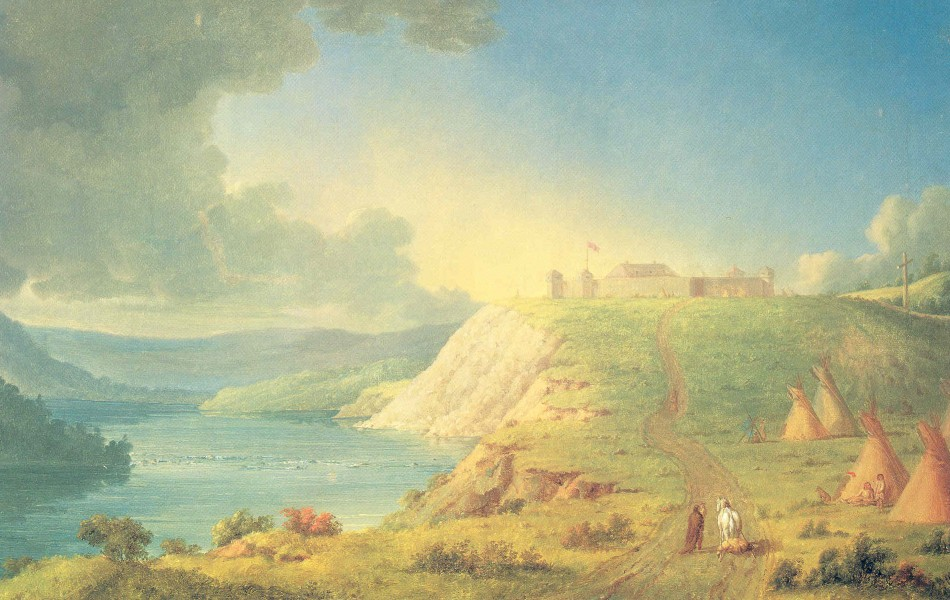
Fort Edmonton; painting by Paul Kane (1810–1871), 1849–56.

The economic struggle represented by the fur trade was paralleled by a spiritual struggle between rival Christian churches hoping to win converts among the native Indians. The first Roman Catholic missionary was Jean-Baptiste Thibault, who arrived at Lac Sainte Anne in 1842. The Methodist Robert Rundle arrived in 1840 and established Rundle's Mission in 1847.

In 1864 the Roman Catholic Church in Canada tasked Albert Lacombe with evangelizing the Plains Indians, with which he had some success. Several Alberta towns and regions were first settled by French missionary activity, such as St. Albert, and St. Paul. The Anglican Church of Canada and several other Protestant denominations also sent missions to the Natives.

The area later to become Alberta was acquired by the fledgling Dominion of Canada in 1870 in the hopes that it would become an agricultural frontier settled by White Canadians. To "open up" the land to settlement, the government began negotiating the Numbered Treaties with the various Native nations, which offered them reserved lands and the right to government support in exchange for ceding all claims to the majority of the lands to the Crown. At the same time the decline of the HBC's power had allowed American whisky traders and hunters to expand into southern Alberta, disrupting the Native way of life. Of particular concern was Fort Whoop-Up near present-day Lethbridge, and the associated Cypress Hills massacre of 1873.

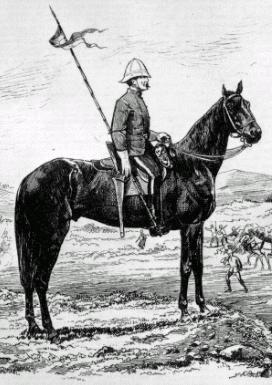
North-West Mounted Police lancer, 1875.

At the same time as whisky was being introduced to the First Nations, firearms were becoming more easily available. Meanwhile, white hunters were shooting huge numbers of plains bison, the primary food source of the plains tribes. Diseases were also spreading among the tribes. Warfare and starvation became rampant on the plains. Eventually disease and starvation weakened the tribes to the point where warfare became impossible. This culminated in 1870 with the Battle of the Belly River between the Blackfoot Confederacy and the Cree. It was the last major battle fought between native nations on Canadian soil.

To bring law and order to the West, the government created the North-West Mounted Police, the "Mounties", in 1873. In July 1874, 275 officers began the March West towards Alberta. They reached the western end of the trek by setting up a new headquarters at Fort Macleod. The force was then divided, half going north to Edmonton, and half heading back to Manitoba. The next year, new outposts were founded: Fort Walsh in the Cypress Hills, and Fort Calgary, around which the city of Calgary formed.

As the bison disappeared from the Canadian West, cattle ranches moved in to take their place. Ranchers were among the most successful early settlers. The arid prairies and foothills were well suited to American-style, dry-land, open-range ranching. Black American cowboy John Ware brought the first cattle into the province in 1876. Like most hired hands, Ware was American, but the industry was dominated by powerful British- and Ontario-born magnates such as Patrick Burns.

The peace and stability the Mounties brought fostered dreams of mass settlement on the Canadian Prairies. The land was surveyed by the Canadian Pacific Survey for possible routes to the Pacific. The early favourite was a northerly line that went through Edmonton and the Yellowhead Pass. The success of the Mounties in the south, coupled with a government desire to establish Canadian sovereignty of that area, and the Canadian Pacific Railway's (CPR) desire to undercut land speculators, prompted the CPR to announce a last minute switch of the route to a more southerly path passing through Calgary and the Kicking Horse Pass. This was against the advice of some surveyors who said that the south was an arid zone not suitable for agricultural settlement.

In 1882 the District of Alberta was created as part of the North-West Territories, and named for Princess Louise Caroline Alberta, fourth daughter of Queen Victoria, and wife of the Marquess of Lorne, who was Governor General of Canada at the time.

=== Settlement ===
The CPR went ahead and was nearly completed in 1885 when the North-West Rebellion, led by Louis Riel, broke out between Métis and First Nations groups and the Canadian government. The rebellion stretched over what is now Saskatchewan and Alberta. After a Cree war party attacked a white settlement at Frog Lake, Saskatchewan (now in Alberta), Canadian militia from Ontario were sent to the District of Alberta via the CPR and fought against the rebels. The rebels were defeated at Batoche, Saskatchewan, and Riel was later taken prisoner.

After the 1885 North-West Rebellion was put down, settlers began to pour into Alberta. The closing of the American frontier around 1890 led 600,000 Americans (mainly from the Midwest and Southern Plains states) to move to Saskatchewan and Alberta, where the farming frontier flourished 1897–1914.

The railways developed town sites six to ten miles (9.7–16.1 km) apart and lumber companies and speculators loaned money to encourage building on the lots. Immigrants faced an unfamiliar, harsh environment. Building a home, clearing and cultivating thirty acres (12 ha), and fencing the entire property, all of which were requirements of homesteaders seeking title to their new land, were difficult tasks in the glacier-carved valleys.

==== Canadians, Americans, British, Germans, and Ukrainians ====
Initially the government preferred English-speaking settlers from Eastern Canada or Great Britain and to a lesser extent, the United States. However, to speed up the rate of settlement, the government under the direction of Minister of the Interior Clifford Sifton soon began advertising to attract settlers from continental Europe. Large numbers of Germans, Ukrainians and Scandinavians moved in, among others, often coalescing into distinct ethnic settlement blocks, giving parts of Alberta distinctive ethnic clusters.

Wiseman (2011) argues that the heavy influx of 600,000 immigrants from the United States brought along such political ideals such as liberalism, individualism, and egalitarianism, as opposed to traditional English Canadian themes such as toryism and socialism. One result was the growth of the Non-Partisan League.

==== Norwegians ====
One typical settlement involved Norwegians from Minnesota. In 1894, Norwegian farmers from Minnesota's Red River Valley, originally from Bardo, Norway, resettled on Amisk Creek south of Beaverhill Lake naming their new settlement Bardo, after their homeland. Since the Land Act of 1872, Canada had eagerly sought to establish planned single-nationality immigrant colonies in the Western Provinces. The settlement at Bardo grew steadily, and from 1900 on most settlers came directly from Bardo, Norway, joining family and former neighbours. While somewhat primitive living conditions were the norm for many years into the 20th century, the settlers quickly established institutions and social outlets, including a Lutheran congregation, a school, the Bardo Ladies' Aid Society, a literary society, a youth choir, and a brass band.

==== Welsh ====
In July 1897 the CPR began work on a railway passing through Crow's Nest Pass. To attract a thousand workers from Wales who would eventually settle in Canada, the British government offered workers $1.50 a day and land through the homestead process. Publicized by shipping companies and newspapers, the scheme drew many workers from Bangor, North Wales, where quarrymen had been on strike for nearly a year. However, the transport costs alone were more than many Welsh workers could afford, and this limited the number of people responding to the offer to under 150. By November letters began to arrive in Wales complaining about the living and working conditions in the CPR camps. Government officials, seeking to populate the Canadian prairies, began to downplay the criticisms and present more positive views. Although some of the immigrants eventually found prosperity in Canada, the immigration scheme envisioned by government and railroad officials was canceled in 1898.

==== Mormons ====
About 3,200 Mormons arrived from Utah, where their practice of polygamy had been outlawed. They were very community oriented, setting up 17 farm settlements; they pioneered in irrigation techniques. They flourished and in 1923 opened the Cardston Alberta Temple in their centre of Cardston. About 82,697 Mormons live in Alberta.

== Drive to provincehood ==
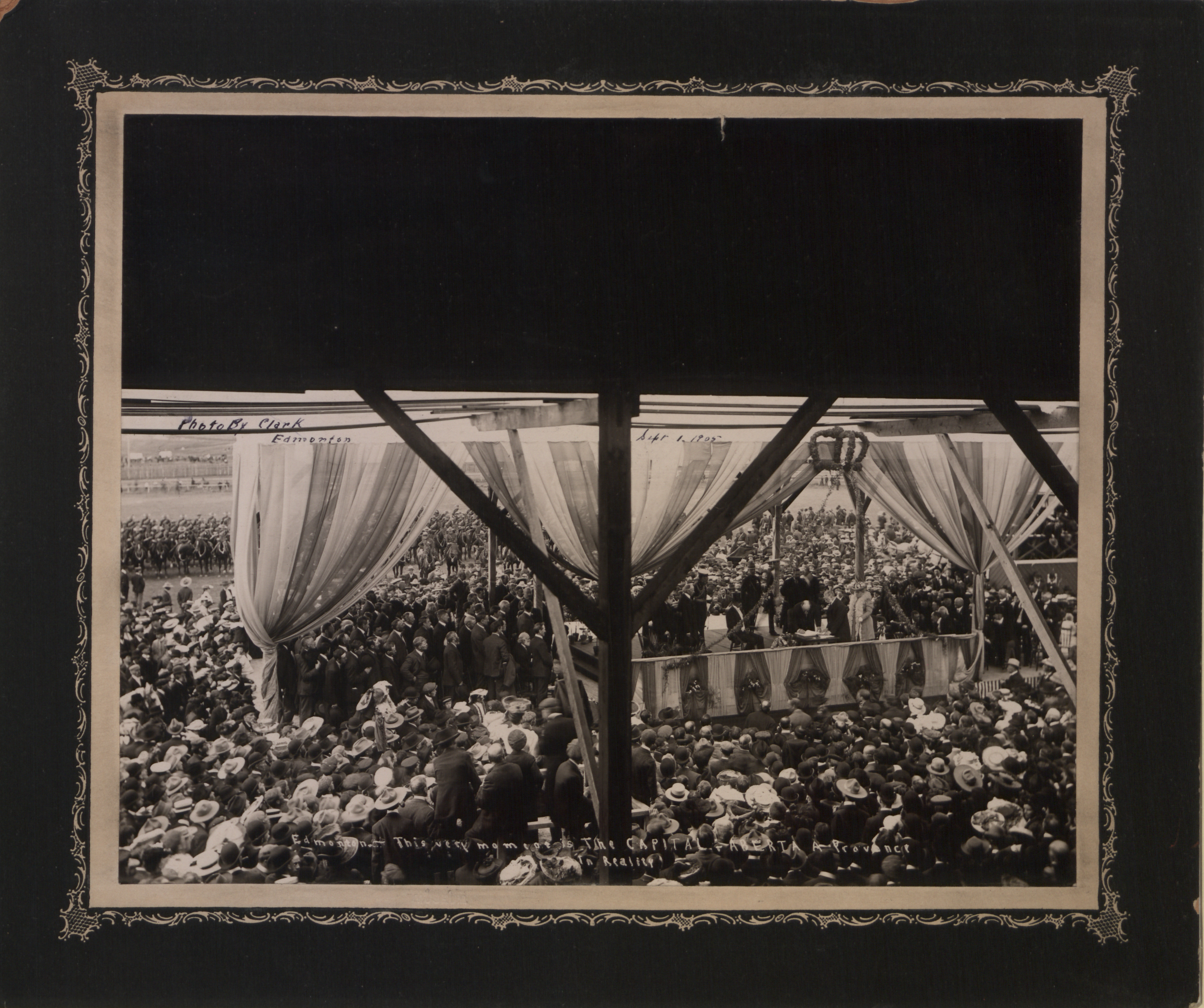
Crowds in Edmonton mark the creation of the Province of Alberta, 1 September 1905

At the dawn of the 20th century Alberta was simply a district of the North-West Territories, with parts of the future province being in the districts of Athabasca, Assiniboia and Saskatchewan. Local leaders lobbied hard for provincial status. The premier of the territories, Sir Frederick Haultain, was one of the most persistent and vocal supporters of provincehood for the West. However, his plan for provincial status in the West was not a plan for the provinces of Alberta and Saskatchewan that was eventually adopted; rather he favoured the creation of one very large province called Buffalo. Other proposals called for three provinces, or two provinces with a border running east–west instead of north–south.

The prime minister of the day, Sir Wilfrid Laurier, did not want to concentrate too much power in one province, which might grow to rival Quebec and Ontario, but neither did he think three provinces were viable, and so opted for the two-province plan. Alberta became a province along with Saskatchewan on September 1, 1905.

Haultain might have been expected to be appointed as the first Premier of Alberta. However, Haultain was Conservative while Laurier was Liberal. Laurier opted to have Lieutenant Governor George H. V. Bulyea appoint the Liberal Alexander Rutherford, whose government would later fall in the Alberta and Great Waterways Railway scandal.

Alberta's other main leader at the time was Frank Oliver. He founded Edmonton's influential Bulletin newspaper in 1880 from which he espoused a sharp criticism of Liberal policies in the West. He was especially disapproving of Ukrainian settlement. He was elected to the territorial assembly, but resigned to become a federal MP. He replaced Sifton as Minister of the Interior and set about reducing support for European immigration. At the same time, he was in charge of drawing up the boundaries of the provincial ridings for the 1905 Alberta elections. He is accused by some of gerrymandering the boundaries to favour Liberal Edmonton over Tory Calgary.

Together Oliver and Rutherford made sure that Edmonton became Alberta's capital.

== Early 20th century ==
The new province of Alberta had a population of 78,000 but apart from the Canadian Pacific Railway it lacked infrastructure. The people were farmers and they lacked schools and medical facilities. Ottawa retained control of its natural resources until 1930, making economic development difficult and complicating federal-provincial relations. Indeed, battles over oil poisoned relations with the federal government, especially after 1970.

=== Politics ===
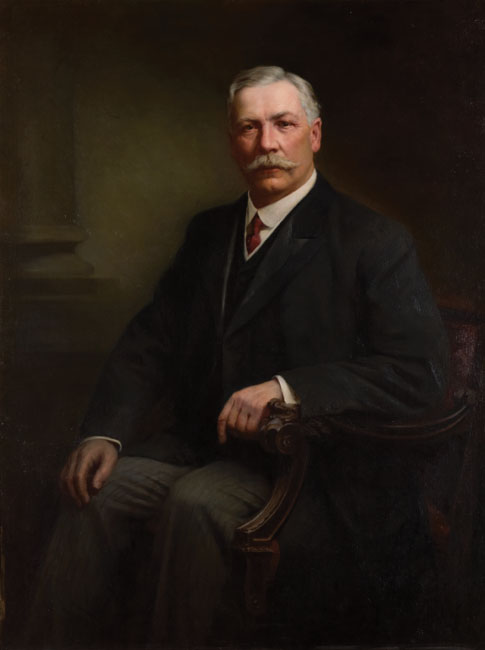
Alexander Rutherford, Alberta's first premier, took advantage of the political power handed to him by the federal government

The Liberals formed the first government of Alberta and remained in office until 1921. After the election of 1905, Premier Alexander C. Rutherford's government started work on the governmental infrastructure, especially regarding legal and municipal affairs. Rutherford, a gentleman of the old school, was a weak leader but he was supportive of education, pushing for the establishment of a provincial university. If Calgary was annoyed when Edmonton was chosen as the capital, that annoyance grew into outrage in 1906 when the University of Alberta was given to Strathcona (a twin city that soon amalgamated with Edmonton, in 1912). Talented Conservatives sought their political fortune in national rather than provincial politics, most notably R. B. Bennett, who became prime minister in 1930.

Communication was enhanced when a telephone system was set up for the towns and cities. Long-term economic growth was stimulated by the construction through Edmonton of two additional transcontinental railways, which later became part of the Canadian National Railway. Their main role was to ship people in and wheat out. Drawn by cheap farm land and high wheat prices, immigration reached record levels, and the population reached 470,000 by 1914.

==== Farm movements ====
Feeling abused by the railways and the grain elevators, militant farm organizations appeared, notably the United Farmers of Alberta (UFA), formed in 1909. Guided by the ideas of William Irvine and later by Henry Wise Wood, the UFA was intended at first to represent economic interests rather than to act as another political party. But farmers' dissatisfaction with Liberal provincial policies and Conservative federal policies, combined with falling wheat prices and a railway company scandal, drove the farmers to favour direct politics and the election of three Farmer-oriented MLAs and an MP in the 1917 to 1921 period opened the door to a general contesting for power in 1921. The UFA achieved an overwhelming landslide in the 1921 provincial election. Alberta also gave all the Alberta seats to UFA and Labour candidates in the 1921 federal election. The elected MPs worked with the Progressive Party of Canada, a national farm organization that held the balance of power for minority Liberal and Conservative governments during much of the 1920s.

John E. Brownlee led the UFA to a second majority government in the 1926 election. During his reign, the UFA government repealed prohibition, replacing it with government sale of liquor and heavily regulated privately run bar-rooms, passed a Debt Adjustment Act to help indebted farmers, and aided workers with progressive wage codes. It abolished the provincial police, passing law enforcement outside of the municipalities to the Royal Canadian Mounted Police. The government bailed out the bankrupt Alberta Wheat Pool in 1929. The high point of Brownlee's administration came after long negotiations with the federal government concerning Alberta's natural resources. In 1930, control of these resources was turned over to the province. Hurrying to hold an election before the full effect of the Depression kicked in, Brownlee led the UFA to a third majority government in 1930. But he moved to the fiscal right, thereby alienating socialists, radical farmers and labour groups.

In 1935, support for the UFA collapsed. Its defeat was in part due to the John Brownlee sex scandal and in part due to the government's inability to raise wheat prices or otherwise mitigate the Great Depression in Canada. A prolonged drought in the southern part of the province produced small grain harvests and forced the abandonment and/or foreclosure of thousands of farms. The financial picture for farmers was made bleak by low world prices for grain. Heavily indebted and operating with slim profit margins, farmers were open to reforms of banks and money that had been kicking since the start of commercial farming in the 1880s in western Canada. The UFA leadership were leery of such proposals, and farmers turned to William Aberhart's Social Credit movement as a weapon to do battle against what were seen as grasping bankers and collection agencies.

After the 1935 defeat, the UFA pulled back to its economic-activity core purpose, as a chain of co-operative farm-supply stores and farmers' lobby group.

=== Medical care and nursing ===
The first homesteaders relied on themselves and their neighbours for medical services. Doctors were few. Pioneer healing women used traditional remedies and laxatives. The reliance on homeopathic remedies continued as trained nurses and doctors became more common among the pioneer communities in the early part of the 20th century. After 1900, medicine, especially nursing, and especially in urban areas, modernized and became well organized.

The Lethbridge Nursing Mission in Alberta was a representative Canadian voluntary mission. It was founded, independent of the Victorian Order of Nurses, in 1909 by Jessie Turnbull Robinson. A former nurse, Robinson was elected as president of the Lethbridge Relief Society and began district nursing services aimed at poor women and children. The mission was governed by a volunteer board of women directors and began by raising money for its first year of service through charitable donations and payments from the Metropolitan Life Insurance Company. The mission also blended social work with nursing, becoming the dispenser of unemployment relief.

Richardson (1998) examines the social, political, economic, class, and professional factors that contributed to ideological and practical differences between leaders of the Alberta Association of Graduate Nurses (AAGN), established in 1916, and the United Farm Women of Alberta (UFWA), founded in 1915, regarding the promotion and acceptance of midwifery as a recognized subspecialty of registered nurses. Accusing the AAGN of ignoring the medical needs of rural Alberta women, the leaders of the UFWA worked to improve economic and living conditions of women farmers. Irene Parlby, the UFWA's first president, lobbied for the establishment of a provincial Department of Public Health, government-provided hospitals and doctors, and passage of a law to permit nurses to qualify as registered midwives. The AAGN leadership opposed midwife certification, arguing that nursing curricula left no room for midwife study, and thus nurses were not qualified to participate in home births. In 1919 the AAGN compromised with the UFWA, and they worked together for the passage of the Public Health Nurses Act that allowed nurses to serve as midwives in regions without doctors. Thus, Alberta's District Nursing Service, created in 1919 to coordinate the province's women's health resources, resulted chiefly from the organized, persistent political activism of UFWA members and only minimally from the actions of professional nursing groups clearly uninterested in rural Canadians' medical needs.

The Alberta District Nursing Service administered health care in the predominantly rural and impoverished areas of Alberta in the first half of the 20th century. Founded in 1919 to meet maternal and emergency medical needs by the United Farm Women of Alberta (UFWA), the Nursing Service treated prairie settlers living in primitive areas lacking doctors and hospitals. Nurses provided prenatal care, worked as midwives, performed minor surgery, conducted medical inspections of schoolchildren, and sponsored immunization programs. The post-World War II discovery of large oil and gas reserves resulted in economic prosperity and the expansion of local medical services. The passage of provincial health and universal hospital insurance in 1957 precipitated the eventual phasing out of the obsolete District Nursing Service in 1976.

==== First Nations ====
Because health care was not provided by treaty with the Canadian government, First Nations reserve residents in the early 20th century usually received this service from private groups. The Anglican Church Missionary Society ran hospitals for the Blackfoot bands of southern Alberta during this time. In the 1920s the Canadian government authorized funds for building hospitals on both the Blackfoot and Blood reserves. They emphasized the treatment of tuberculosis through long-term care.

There was a strong link between federal Indian health care and the ideology of social reform operating in Canada between the 1890s and 1930. Between the 1890s and 1930 the Department of Indian Affairs became increasingly involved in Indian health. With the aim of revealing aspects of the department's Indian health administration in this early period, this article describes the creation and workings of two hospitals on Indian reserves in southern Alberta. The federal government took two main steps in dealing with Indian peoples' health: it built hospitals on reserves, and it created a system of medical officers to staff these facilities. Before World War II, the health care system had a number of characteristics: it was a system initially operated by missionaries and later taken over by the Department of Indian Affairs, it was an extensive and decentralized system, the health care services delivered by the system were firmly rooted in Canadian middle-class reformist values and represented an attempt to have these values applied to Indian communities, and, apparently, the system served peoples who were reluctant to use the facilities and services made available to them. Contrary to the idea that prior to World War II the federal government refused to take responsibility for Indian health in Canada, the development of an Indian health policy and system had already taken place gradually.

=== Religion, ethnicity ===
==== Canadianization ====
Assimilation into Canadian culture was the norm for nearly all European immigrants, according to Prokop (1989). An important indicator of assimilation was the use of English; the children of all immigrant groups showed a strong preference in favour of speaking English, regardless of their parents' language. From 1900 to 1930, the government faced the formidable task of transforming the ethnically and linguistically diverse immigrant population into loyal and true Canadians. Many officials believed language assimilation by children would be the key to Canadianization. However, there was opposition to the direct method of English teaching from some immigrant spokesmen. English-language usage in playground games often proved an effective device, and was systematically used. The elementary schools especially in rural Alberta played a central role in the acculturation of the immigrants and their children, providing, according to Prokop, a community character that created a distinctive feature of Canadian schools glaringly missing in the European school tradition.

==== Protestants ====
During the interwar period the various components of the Alberta Woman's Missionary Societies worked tirelessly to maintain traditional Anglo-Protestant family and moral values. Comprising a number of mainstream denominational groups and at one time numbering over five thousand members, the societies actively sought to "Christianize and Canadianize" the substantial numbers of Ukrainian immigrants who settled in the province. A particular focus was child education, with music activities used as a recruiting tool. Some chapters admitted male members. The movement faded as general society shifted away from religious activities and the conservative fundamentalist movement gained strength.

Methodist revivalism in early-20th-century Calgary promoted progress and bourgeois respectability as much as spiritual renewal. In 1908, the Central Methodist Church hosted American evangelicals H. L. Gale and J. W. Hatch. They drew big crowds, but the message was mild and the audience calm and well dressed. Few became church members after the revival was over, however. Working-class attendees probably experienced discomfort among their better-dressed and better-behaved neighbours, and the church leadership maintained strong ties to local business interests but did little to reach out to the lower classes. The cottage meetings that followed the revival typically took place in middle-class homes.

Prohibition of alcoholic drinks was a major political issue, pitting the Anglophone Protestants against most ethnic groups. The Alberta Temperance and Moral Reform League, founded in 1907, was based in Methodist and other Protestant churches and used anti-German themes to pass legislation putting prohibition into effect in July 1916. The laws were repealed in 1926.

==== Catholics ====
The Catholic archbishop of Edmonton, Henry Joseph O'Leary affected the city's Catholic sectors considerably, and his efforts reflect many of the challenges facing the Catholic Church at that time. During the 1920s, O'Leary favoured his fellow Irish and drastically reduced the influence of French Catholic clergy in his archdiocese and replaced them with Anglophone priests. He helped to assimilate Ukrainian Catholic immigrants into the stricter Roman Catholic traditions, extended the viability of Edmonton's separate Catholic school system, and established both a Catholic college at the University of Alberta and a seminary in Edmonton.

==== Francophone ====
In 1892 the North-West Territories adopted the Ontario schools' model, emphasizing state-run institutions that glorified not only the English language but English history and customs as well. Alberta continued this model after the province was established. Predominantly francophone communities in Alberta maintained some control of local schools by electing trustees sympathetic to French language and culture. Such groups as the Association Canadienne-Française de l'Alberta expected trustees to implement their own cultural agenda. An additional problem francophone communities faced was the constant shortage of qualified francophone teachers during 1908–35; the majority of those hired left their positions after only a few years of service. After 1940 school consolidation largely ignored the language and culture issues of francophones.

==== Ukrainians ====
A key controversy concerning the linguistic rights of ethnic minorities in western Canada was the 1913 Ruthenian School Revolt in the Edmonton area. Ukrainian immigrants, called "Galicians" or "Ruthenians" by Anglo-Celtic Canadians, settled in the vicinity of Edmonton. The attempts by the Ukrainian community to use the Liberal Party to garner political power in districts that were predominantly Ukrainian and introduce bilingual education in those areas, were quashed by party leaders, who blamed a group of teachers for the initiative. As a reprisal, these teachers were labelled "unqualified". The various rebellious actions by Ukrainian residents of the Bukowina school district did not prevent the dismissal of Ukrainian teachers. By 1915 it was clear that bilingual education would not be tolerated in early-20th-century Alberta.

==== Italians ====
Italians arrived in two waves, the first from 1900 to 1914, the second after the Second World War. The first arrivals came as temporary and seasonal workers, often returning to southern Italy after a few years. Others became permanent urban dwellers, especially when the First World War prevented international travel. From the outset they began to affect the cultural and commercial life of the area. As "Little Italy" grew it started to provide essential services for its members, such as a consul and the Order of the Sons of Italy, and an active fascist party provided a means of social organization. Initially the Italians coexisted peacefully with their neighbours, but during World War II they were the victims of prejudice and discrimination to the point that even today Italians in Calgary feel that Canadian society does not reward those who maintain their ethnicity.

=== Rural life ===
An economic crisis engulfed much of rural Alberta in the early 1920s, as wheat prices plunged from their wartime highs and farmers found themselves deep in debt.

==== Farms ====
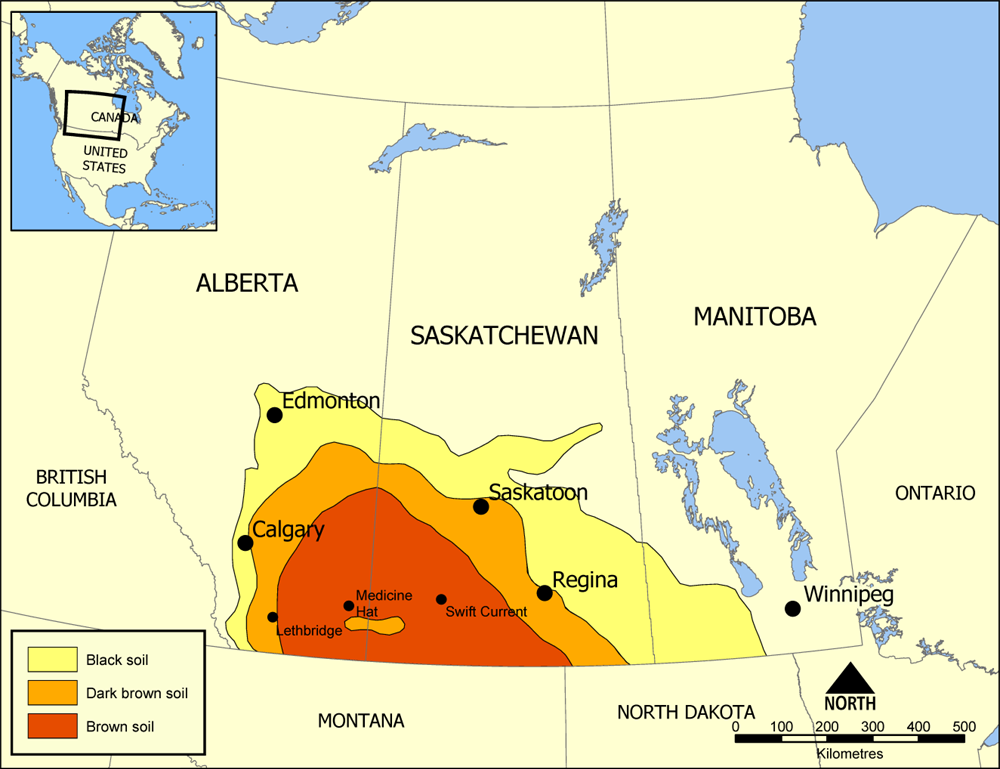
Map of Palliser's Triangle.

Wheat was the dominant crop and the tall grain elevator alongside the railway tracks became a crucial element of the Alberta grain trade after 1890. It boosted "King Wheat" to regional dominance by integrating the province's economy with the rest of Canada. Used to efficiently load grain into railroad cars, grain elevators came to be clustered in "lines" and their ownership tended to concentrate in the hands of increasingly fewer companies, many controlled by Americans. The main commercial entities involved in the trade were the Canadian Pacific Railway and the powerful grain syndicates. Many newcomers were unfamiliar with the dry farming techniques need to handle a wheat crop, so The Canadian Pacific Railway (CPR) set up a demonstration farm at Strathmore, in 1908. It sold irrigable land and advised settlers in the best farming and irrigation methods. Dramatic changes in the Alberta grain trade took place in the 1940s, notably the amalgamation of grain elevator companies.

Recklessness, greed, and overoptimism played a part in the early-20th-century financial crisis on the Canadian wheat frontier. Beginning in 1916, the Palliser Triangle, a semiarid region in Alberta and Saskatchewan, suffered a decade of dry years and crop failures that culminated in financial ruin for many of the region's wheat farmers. Overconfidence on the part of farmers, financiers, the Canadian Pacific Railway, and the Canadian government led to land investments and development in the Palliser on an unprecedented and dangerous scale. A large share of this expansion was funded by mortgage and loan companies in Britain eager to make overseas investments.

British money managers were driven by a complex set of global economic forces including a decline in British investment opportunities, excess capital, and massive investment expansion on the Canadian frontier. Reduced grain production in Europe and increased grain production in the prairie provinces also encouraged the export of capital from London. The mythical image of the Palliser as an abundant region, coupled with a growing confidence in technology, created a false sense of security and stability. Between 1908 and 1913 British firms lent vast sums to Canadian farmers to plant their wheat crops; only when the drought began in 1916 did it become clear that far too much credit had been extended.

==== Ranches and mixed farming ====
The term "mixed farming" better applies to southern Alberta agricultural practices during 1881–1914 than does "ranching". "Pure ranching" involves cowboys working predominantly from horseback; it was the norm when huge ranches were formed in 1881. Quickly practices were modified. Hay was planted and cut in summer to provide winter cattle feed; fences were built and repaired to contain winter herds; and dairy cows and barnyard animals were maintained for personal consumption and secondarily for market. Mixed farming was clearly predominant in southern Alberta by 1900.

Captain Charles Augustus Lyndon and his wife, Margaret, established one of the first ranches in Alberta in 1881. Lyndon homesteaded a site in the Porcupine Hills west of Fort Macleod. They primarily raised cattle but also raised horses for the Royal Canadian Mounted Police for additional income. Lyndon's herds suffered with others' herds during the hard winter of 1886–87. He developed an irrigation system and a post office as the district grew during the 1890s. Although Lyndon died in 1903, his family maintained his enterprises until 1966 when the ranch was sold.

Elofson (2005) shows that free-range cattle ranching was much the same in Montana, Southern Alberta, and Southern Saskatchewan. Benson (2000) describes the social structure for cowboys and other workers on large, corporate ranches in southwestern Alberta around 1900. Four of those ranches, the Cochrane, the Oxley, the Walrond, and the Bar U, demonstrate the complex hierarchies that separated cowboys from cooks and foremen from managers. Ethnic, educational, and age differences further complicated the elaborate social fabric of the corporate ranches. The resulting division of labour and hierarchy permitted Alberta's ranches to function without the direct involvement of investors and owners, most of whom lived in eastern Canada and Britain.

The survival of Alberta's cattle industry was seriously in doubt for most of the late 19th and early 20th centuries. At two points during this time, 1887–1900 and 1914–20, the industry enjoyed great prosperity. The latter boom began when the United States enacted the Underwood Tariff of 1913, allowing Canadian cattle free entry. Exporting Alberta cattle to Chicago markets proved highly profitable for the highest quality livestock. By 1915, most stocker and feeder cattle from the Winnipeg stockyards were exported to the United States, harming Canada's domestic beef market. Several factors, including the severe winter of 1919–20, the end of inflated wartime prices for beef, and the reinstitution of the US tariff on Canadian cattle, all contributed to the collapse of the Alberta cattle market. The boom ultimately worked against Alberta's economic interests because the high prices during that period made it unfeasible to establish local cattle finishing practices.

Some ranchers became important entrepreneurs. A rancher and brewer with secondary interests in gas, electricity, and oil, Calgary entrepreneur Alfred Ernest Cross (1861–1932) was a significant agent of modernization in Alberta and the Canadian West. As with others, his name symbolizes a driving force of enterprise, the pursuit of profit, family-centred capitalism, use of Canada's and Britain's capital markets, and economic progression through reinvestment of earnings. His personal family management developed a family estate that remains significant in Alberta's economy. Cross is remembered principally for his cattle breeding advances and his dynamism and scientific approach to brewing.

==== Women ====
Gender roles were sharply defined. Men were primarily responsible for breaking the land; planting and harvesting; building the house; buying, operating and repairing machinery; and handling finances. At first there were many single men on the prairie, or husbands whose wives were still back east, but they had a hard time. They realized the need for a wife. As the population increased rapidly, wives played a central role in settlement of the prairie region. Their labour, skills, and ability to adapt to the harsh environment proved decisive in meeting the challenges. They prepared bannock, beans and bacon, mended clothes, raised children, cleaned, tended the garden, helped at harvest time and nursed everyone back to health. While prevailing patriarchal attitudes, legislation, and economic principles obscured women's contributions, the flexibility exhibited by farm women in performing productive and nonproductive labour was critical to the survival of family farms, and thus to the success of the wheat economy.

==== Miners ====
James Moodie developed the Rosedale Mine in Alberta's Red Deer River Valley in 1911. Although Moodie paid higher wages and operated the mine more safely and efficiently than other coal mines in the province, the Rosedale experienced work slowdowns and strikes. Because Moodie owned the mine and provided services for the camp, Bolshevik sympathizers considered him an oppressor of the labourers and a bourgeois industrialist. The radicalism at the mine diminished as Moodie replaced the immigrant miners with Canadian military veterans ready to appreciate the safe work environment offered there.

=== Urban life ===
In the larger cities the Alberta chapter of the Canadian Red Cross provided relief services to the community during the hard years of the 1920s and 1930s. It also successfully lobbied the government to take a more active and responsible role in looking after the people during difficult times. Every town had its boosters who dreamed big, but most towns remained just villages. An example is Bow City, which seemed promising because of its coal deposits and good grazing land. Lumber merchants combined to form Bow Centre Collieries Ltd., and sold real estate to speculators. Bad luck, in the form of drought at the time of the First World War I ruined the ambitions.

==== Business ====
Most business operations were family affairs, with relatively few large-scale operations apart from the railways. In 1886, the Cowdry brothers (Nathaniel and John) opened a private bank at Fort Macleod. Its history provides a prototype to show how a small-scale private banking house became an important force in early southwestern Alberta finance. Both brothers were astute businessmen, community leaders, and had absolute confidence in each other – so much so that in 1888 Nathaniel returned to Lindsay (later Simcoe) and became a grain merchant. The banking business expanded, with branches being opened and advertising and the lending of money becoming widespread. In March 1905, the Cowdrys sold their banking concerns at Fort Macleod to the Canadian Imperial Bank of Commerce. The role of family enterprise in private banking during the late 19th and early 20th centuries was pivotal in providing an important channel for the flow of credit into southwestern Alberta and facilitated the emergence of the modern economy.

After a dramatic economic boom during the First World War, a sharp, short depression hit Alberta in 1920–22. Conditions were typical in the town of Red Deer, a railroad and trading centre midway between Calgary and Edmonton that depended on farmers. Hardship during the early 1920s was as severe, or even somewhat worse, than those experienced during the much longer Great Depression of the 1930s. The groundwork for the economic collapse had been laid as early as 1913, when the speculative boom that had fuelled Alberta's prosperity had collapsed. But the outbreak of the First World War in 1914 initiated an enormous demand for agricultural products and helped to mask the serious weaknesses of the provincial economy. With the conclusion of the war, however, unemployment skyrocketed as veterans returned and inflation increased. Grain prices began to fall in 1920, causing further hardships. By the spring of 1921, many Red Deer businesses had gone bankrupt, and the city's unemployment rate was estimated at 20%. The city's economic situation began to improve in 1923, and Red Deer city officials were finally able to collect enough tax revenues to avoid the need for short-term bank loans.

==== Women ====
Up to the 1880s prostitution in Alberta was tolerated and not considered serious. But as the itinerant population became more settled this attitude gradually changed. The years 1880–1909 witnessed few arrests and even fewer fines for prostitution, in part because those caught were encouraged to leave town rather than be jailed. Later, 1909–14, a smallpox epidemic in the red-light district started a crackdown against prostitution, which by then was regarded as a major problem, especially by middle-class women reformers. The Woman's Christian Temperance Union vigorously opposed both saloons and prostitution, and called for woman suffrage as a tool to end those evils.

The Calgary Current Events Club, started in 1927 by seven women, rapidly gained popularity with professional women of the city. In 1929 the group changed its name to the Calgary Business and Professional Women's Club (BPW) in response to a call for a national federation of such groups. Members travelled to London, England, in 1929 to make the case for recognizing women as full legal citizens. In the 1930s the group addressed many of the controversial political issues of the day, including the introduction of a minimum wage, fair unemployment insurance legislation, the compulsory medical examination of school children, and the requirement of a medical certificate for marriage. The national convention of the BPW was held in Calgary in 1935. The club actively supported Canadian overseas forces in World War II. At first most of the members were secretaries and office workers; more recently it has been dominated by executives and professions. The organization continues to attend to women's economic and social issues.

==== Cinema ====
Motion pictures have been an important aspect of urban culture since 1910. The places where people have watched films, from the nickelodeon to the multiplex, have changed in ways that reflect changes in the society generally. The cinema in Edmonton reflected the changing urban landscape. Because the movie houses themselves are part of the entertainment product, the cinema industry follows a cycle of construction, renovation, and demolition. The industry's face is constantly changing in an effort to draw people inside; Edmonton's cinemas have moved with the retail industry from the downtown core to the suburban shopping malls, and are now experimenting with new formats similar to retailers' big boxes. Just as Edmonton is known for massive amounts of retail space, it also has one of the highest numbers of movie screens in Canada in proportion to its population. Cinemas are thus a revealing aspect of trends in urban development.

==== Sports ====
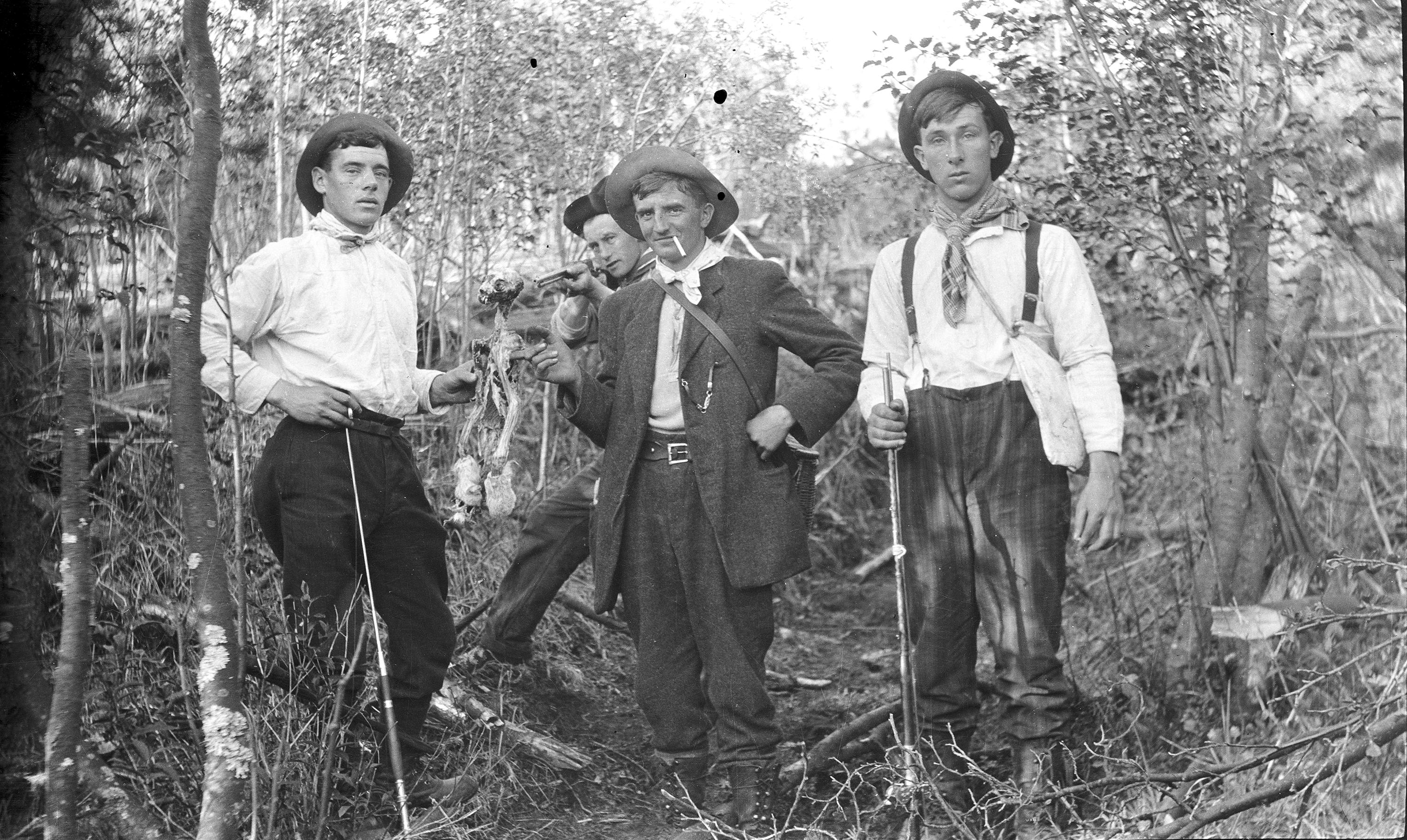
Hunting party, 1916

Throughout the province popular sports included skiing, and skating for everyone, and hunting and fishing for men and boys.

Competitive sports emerged in urban areas, especially hockey. It provided an arena for the civic rivalries such as those between the cities of Edmonton and neighbouring Strathcona during the late 19th and early 20th centuries. Edmonton, on the north bank of the Saskatchewan River, and Strathcona, on the south bank of the river, developed separately – economically, politically, and socially – because travel and communication across the river were limited. (They merged in 1912.) In addition to affording an outlet for civic rivalries, the games between the Edmonton Thistle and Strathcona Shamrock hockey clubs united individuals from different social classes and diverse cultural backgrounds in support of their team.

Skiing began in Banff in the 1890s and received its main impetus with the winter carnival in 1916. In the next decades the carnival became popular; ski jumping and cross-country races led to much publicity. By 1940, Banff had become one of Canada's leading skiing centres, and was heavily promoted as a vacation destination by the Canadian Pacific railway.

=== Oil, gas and oil sands ===
Alberta has played the central role in Canada's petroleum industry —both from the discovery and development of conventional oil and natural gas, and through the development of the world's foremost bitumen deposits in the province's vast northern oil sands. The province became one of the world's foremost producers of crude oil and natural gas, generating billions of revenue for the province and igniting a bitter feud with the national government.

The first oil field in western Canada was Turner Valley, south of Calgary, where large supplies were discovered at a depth of about 3,000 feet (910 m). Calgary became the oil capital, with a reputation for swashbuckling entrepreneurship. Turner Valley was for a time the largest oil and gas producer in the British Empire. Three distinct phases of discovery marked the field's history and involved such Albertans as William Stewart Herron and A. W. Dingman, and companies that included Calgary Petroleum Products, later the Royalite Oil Company; Turner Valley Royalties; and later the Home Oil Company. In 1931, the province enacted the Oil and Gas Wells Act to reduce the heavy waste of natural gas. In 1938, the Alberta Petroleum and Natural Gas Conservation Board was successfully established and enacted conservation and prorating measures. The goal was to maximize the long-term yield, as well as to protect small producers.

In 1947 an even bigger field opened at Leduc, 20 miles (32 km) south of Edmonton, and in 1948 oil mining began at Redwater. Both these fields were overshadowed in importance in 1956 with the discovery of the Pembina field west of Edmonton. Other fields were discovered east of Grande Prairie and in central Alberta. From collection and distribution points near Edmonton the oil is sent by pipeline to refineries, some as distant as Sarnia, Toronto and Montreal to the east, Vancouver to the west, and especially the U.S. to the South. Interprovincial Pipe Line (IPL) began in 1949, transporting oil to refineries in the east. IPL became Enbridge Pipelines in 1998 and now has 4500 employees; it moves 2 million barrels a day over 13,500 miles (21,700 km) of pipe.

Alberta produced 81% of Canada's crude oil in 1991, when Alberta's traditional oil fields peaked; output is now steadily declining. Before the 1970s, the major producers were controlled by U.S. oil giants.

==== Natural gas ====
Exploration for oil led to the discovery of large reserves of natural gas. The most important gas fields are at Pincher Creek in the southeast, at Medicine Hat, and in the northwest. TransCanada pipeline, completed in 1958, carries some of the gas eastward to Ontario and Quebec; other pipelines run to California. Alberta produces 81% of Canada's natural gas.
An early pioneer in the discovery and use of natural gas was Georg Naumann.

==== Oil sands ====
The "oil sands" or "tar sands" in the Athabasca River valley to the north of Fort McMurray contain an enormous amount of oil, one of the world's richest deposits—second only to Saudi Arabia. The first plant for extracting oil from the tar sands was completed in 1967, and a second plant was completed in 1978. In 1991 the plants produced about 100 million barrels of oil. Expansion was rapid, with very high paid workers flown in from eastern Canada, especially the depressed Maritimes and Newfoundland. In 2006 bitumen production averaged 1.25 million barrels per day (200,000 m^{3}/d) through 81 oil sands projects, representing 47% of total Canadian oil output. The processing of bitumen, however, releases large amounts of carbon dioxide, which has alarmed environmentalists worried about global warming and Canada's carbon footprint.

In the 1960s Great Canadian Oil Sands, a small, indigenous Canadian firm, relied on new technology and heavy capital investment to pioneer oil sand extraction in the Athabascan region. Unfavourable leasing terms from the provincial government and the strong financial risk inherent in the project forced the firm to seek an investment partner. The large American oil company Sun Oil Company took the risk, but as the investment burden on Sun increased, the company became compelled to assume both financial and managerial control of the operation. Thus, the native Canadian firm had to yield its autonomy as the price of pursuing a pioneering but complicated industrial project. In 1995 Sun sold its interest to Suncor Energy, based in Calgary. Suncor is second to Syncrude in the oil sands, but Syncrude is controlled by a consortium of international oil companies.

==== Spin-off industry ====
The province's oil and natural gas furnish raw materials for large industrial complexes at Edmonton and Calgary, as well as for smaller ones at Lethbridge and Medicine Hat. These complexes include oil and gas refineries and plants that use refinery by-products to make plastics, chemicals, and fertilizer. The oil and gas industry provides a market for firms supplying pipes, drills, and other equipment. Large amounts of sulfur are extracted from natural gas in plants near the gas fields. Helium is extracted from the gas in a plant near Edson, west of Edmonton.

== Social Credit ==
Social Credit (often called Socred) was a populist political movement strongest in Alberta and neighboring British Columbia, 1930s–1970s. Social Credit was based on the economic theories of an Englishman, C. H. Douglas. His theories, at first brought to public attention in Alberta by UFA and Labour MPs in the early 1920s, became very popular across the nation in the early 1930s. A central proposal was the free distribution of prosperity certificates (or social credit), called "funny money" by the opposition.

During the Great Depression in Canada the demand for radical action peaked around 1934, after the worst period was over and the economy was recovering. Mortgage debt was a social issue because many farmers could not make their payments and were threatened with foreclosure by banks. Although the UFA government passed legislation protecting farm families from losing the home-quarter, many farm families lived in poverty and faced the loss of the land base needed for viable profitable farms. Their insecurity was a potent factor in creating a mood of political desperation. The farmers' government, the UFA, was baffled by the depression and Albertans demanded new leadership.

Prairie farmers had always believed that they were being exploited by Toronto and Montreal. What they lacked was a prophet who would lead them to the promised land, one who promised, despite the UFA's misgivings, to push aside the existing economic and constitutional barriers to the fight for Social Credit. The Social Credit movement in Alberta found its leader in 1932 when Aberhart read his first Social Credit tract; it became a political party in 1935 and burned like a prairie fire. It was elected to majority government on August 22, 1935.

The prophet and new premier was radio evangelist William Aberhart (1878–1943). The message was biblical prophecy. Aberhart was a fundamentalist, preaching the revealed word of God and quoting the Bible to find a solution for the evils of the modern, materialistic world: the evils of sophisticated academics and their biblical criticism, the cold formality of middle-class congregations, the vices of dancing and movies and drink. "Bible Bill" preached that the capitalist economy was rotten because of its immorality; specifically, it produced goods and services but did not provide people with sufficient purchasing power to enjoy them. This could be remedied by the giving out money in the form of "social credit", or $25 a month for every man and woman. This pump priming was guaranteed to restore prosperity, he prophesied to the 1600 Social Credit clubs he formed in the province.

Alberta's businessmen, professionals, newspaper editors and the traditional middle-class leaders protested vehemently at Aberhart's ideas, which they described as crack-pot, but they did not seem to offer solution of the problems faced by Alberta's workers and farmers and spoke not of the promised land ahead. Aberhart's new party in 1935 elected 56 members to the Assembly, compared to 7 for all the other parties, the previously-governing UFA losing all its seats. The economic theorist for Aberhart was Major Douglas, an English engineer with an unbounded confidence in technology.

The Social Credit Party remained in power for 36 years until 1971, and was re-elected by popular vote nine times. Its continued success was simultaneous with its ideological move from left to the right.

=== Social Credit in office ===
Once in power, Aberhart gave priority to balancing the provincial budget. He reduced expenditures and established (briefly) a sales tax and increased income tax. The poor and unemployed suffered cuts to the rather-thin relief they had gotten under the UFA regime. The $25 monthly social dividend never arrived, as Aberhart decided nothing could be done until the province's financial system was changed. Although, for about a year (1936–37), provincially-issued Prosperity Certificates circulated, providing much-needed purchasing power to Alberta's impoverished farmers and workers. In 1936 Alberta defaulted on its bonds, becoming one of the few jurisdictions in the Western world that has taken such a radical step. He passed a Debt Adjustment Act that cancelled all the interest on mortgages since 1932 and limited all interest rates on mortgages to 5%, in line with similar laws passed by other provinces. In 1937, the government, pressured by its backbenchers, passed a radical banking law that was disallowed by the federal government (banking was a federal responsibility). Efforts to control the press were also disallowed. The government passed a law of recall, but the only constituents who collected signatures for their member's recall were CCF-ers and oilmen in the Turner Valley. The MLA threatened with recall was Aberhart himself – the law was repealed retroactively.

Aberhart's SC government was authoritarian and he tried to exert detailed control over its officeholders (especially in the late 1930s, those who opposed Aberhart's more radical ideas; then in the late 1940s, the die-hards who still called for Douglasite reforms); those who rebelled were dismissed as cabinet ministers and purged, "read out of", the caucus and were not named as party candidate for the next election. Although Aberhart was hostile to banks and newspapers, he was basically in favor of capitalism and did not support socialist policies, unlike the Cooperative Commonwealth Federation (CCF) in Saskatchewan. In Alberta the CCF and Social Credit were bitter enemies, especially in the early 1940s. The antagonism was re-created in Saskatchewan. Thus it was impossible for the two parties to merge in Saskatchewan. The Saskatchewan CCF, already a potent force in that province, took on the mantle of defending workers'/farmers' rights and went on to form government in 1944.

By 1938, the Social Credit government abandoned its promised $25 payouts. Its inability to fulfill its election promises led to heavy defections from the party, including at least one MLA, Edith Rogers, who later moved to the CCF. Aberhart's government was re-elected in the 1940 election, with but 43% of the vote, against a combined Liberal-Conservative coalition under the name People's League. The prosperity of the Second World War relieved the economic fears and hatreds that had fueled farmer unrest. Aberhart died in 1943, and was succeeded as Premier by his student at the Prophetic Bible Institute and lifelong close disciple, Ernest C. Manning (1908–1996).

The Social Credit party, now firmly on the right, governed Alberta until 1968 under Manning. He was succeeded by Harry Strom, who led the Social Credit government to defeat in the 1971 general election.

The anti-Semitic rhetoric of some Social Credit activists greatly troubled Canada's Jewish community; in the late 1940s, Premier Manning belatedly purged the anti-Semites. Major C.H. Douglas, was blatantly anti-Semitic and enamored with the fake Protocols of the Learned Elders of Zion. Aberhart and Manning denied they were anti-Semitic.

By the mid-1980s, Social Credit activists were redeploying into the social conservative Reform Party of Canada by Preston Manning, son of Ernest Manning.

== Second World War ==
Alberta's contribution to the Canadian war effort from 1939 to 1945 was substantial. At home, prisoner of war and internment camps were maintained at Lethbridge, Medicine Hat, Wainwright and in Kananaskis Country, housing captured Axis service personnel as well as Canadian internees. A large number of British Commonwealth Air Training Plan airfields and training establishments were established in the province. Militarily, thousands of men (and later, women) volunteered for the Royal Canadian Navy, Royal Canadian Air Force and Canadian Army. Major David Vivian Currie, a Saskatchewanian serving with the South Alberta Regiment, was awarded the Victoria Cross as was Calgarian Ian Bazalgette, who was killed in air combat. Dozens of Alberta-based militia units provided cadres for overseas units, including The Loyal Edmonton Regiment, Calgary Regiment (Tank), Calgary Highlanders in addition to numerous artillery, engineer, and units of the supporting arms.

In 1942 many Japanese from British Columbia were forcibly sent to internment camps in southern Alberta, which already had Japanese communities at Raymond and Hardieville. At first limited to working in sugar beet fields, the newly arrived Japanese had severe housing, school, and water problems. In the following years some of the Japanese were permitted to work in canning factories, sawmills, and other businesses. There was constant controversy in the press about the role and freedom of the local Japanese. Farm production increased markedly, and after the war few of the Japanese took advantage of the repatriation plan to go to Japan. The Japanese in Alberta today are well assimilated, but little of Japanese heritage remains.

== Postwar ==
After the war, Manning passed several pieces of restrictive legislation that limited labour's ability to organize workers and to call strikes. The enforcement of labour law also reflected an anti-union bias. Social Crediters, who had a penchant for conspiracy theories, believed union militancy was the product of an international Communist conspiracy. Their labour legislation sought to foil the conspiracy's plans in Alberta and incidentally to reassure potential investors, particularly in the oil industry, of a good climate for profit-taking. The path for such legislation was made smoother by the conservatism of one wing of the labour movement in the province and the fear of being tarnished with the Communist brush by the other wing.

=== Conservatives and reform ===
In 1971, Peter Lougheed's Conservatives put an end to the long rule of the Social Credit Party as the Progressive Conservative Party came to power. Many experts maintain that the large-scale social change that occurred in the province as a result of the postwar oil boom was responsible for this important change of government. Urbanization, in particular the expansion of the urban middle classes, secularization, and increasing wealth are often cited as the primary causes of Social Credit's downfall. Bell (1993) challenges this popular interpretation, arguing instead that short-term factors such as leadership, contemporaneous issues, and campaign organization better explain the Conservative triumph.

The Conservatives remained in power, under seven different premiers, for 44 years of majority governments. But in 2015 the government met its demise against a slate of younger, fresher candidates put forward by the Alberta NDP, led by Rachel Notley. In the 2019 election, a newly reunited conservative party, the United Conservative Party, won a majority government.

Forest fires ravaged the land in the 2011 Slave Lake wildfire, the great 2016 Fort McMurray wildfire, the September 2017 Waterton Lakes National Park fire, the 2019 Alberta wildfires, and the state of emergency 2023 conflagrations. Nearly One-Third of the town of Jasper, Alberta was destroyed by the July 2024 Jasper wildfire.

== See also ==
- Battle of the Belly River
- History of Lethbridge
- List of premiers of Alberta
- Natural Resources Acts
- History of the petroleum industry in Canada
- Alberta rural addressing system

== Bibliography ==
- Alberta Online Encyclopedia. Heritage Community Foundation. 2005. Archived from the original on September 6, 2012.
- The Canadian Encyclopedia (Online ed.). Historica Canada. A very good starting point.
- Dictionary of Canadian Biography (Online ed.). University of Toronto/Université Laval. Scholarly biographies of every important person who died by 1930.
- Cashman, Tony (1979). A Picture History of Alberta. Edmonton: Hurtig. ISBN 978-0-8883-0157-4.
- Friesen, Gerald (1987). The Canadian Prairies: A History. University of Toronto Press. ISBN 978-0-8020-6648-0.
- Herk, Aritha van (2001). Mavericks: An Incorrigible History of Alberta. Penguin Canada. ISBN 978-0-14-317695-4. 14 popular essays on the fur trade, aboriginal peoples, exploration, the North-West Mounted Police, ranchers, homesteaders, territorial and provincial politics, women, and Alberta culture.
- Heyking, Amy von (2006). Creating Citizens: History and Identity in Alberta's Schools, 1905–1980. University of Calgary Press. ISBN 978-1-55238-144-1.
- Heyking, Amy von (2006). "Fostering a Provincial Identity: Two eras in Alberta Schooling" (PDF). Canadian Journal of Education. 29 (4): 1127–1156. doi:10.2307/20054213. JSTOR 20054213.
- Klassen, Henry C. (1999). A Business History of Alberta. University of Calgary Press. ISBN 978-1-55238-009-3.
- MacGregor, James Grierson (1972). A History of Alberta. Hurtig. ISBN 978-0-88830-063-8.
- Owram, Douglas, ed. (1979). The Formation of Alberta: A Documentary History. Alberta Records Publication Board. primary sources
- Palmer, Howard; Palmer, Tamara Jeppson (1990). Alberta: A New History. McClelland & Stewart. ISBN 978-0-88830-340-0. standard survey by leading historian
- Pitsula, James M. (2005). "Disparate Duo". Beaver. 85 (4): 14–24. a comparison with Saskatchewan, Fulltext in EBSCO
- Thomas, L.G. (1959). The Liberal Party in Alberta. University of Toronto Press. ISBN 978-0-8357-9769-6.
- Wall, Karen L. (2012). Game Plan: A Social History of Sport in Alberta. University of Alberta. ISBN 978-0-88864-657-6.
- Wardhaugh, Robert, ed. (2001). Toward Defining the Prairies: Region, Culture, and History. University of Manitoba Press. ISBN 978-0-88755-388-2.
- Whitcomb, Ed (2005). A Short History of Alberta. From Sea To Sea Enterprises.

=== Other books ===
- Holt, Faye Reineberg (2009). Alberta: A History in Photographs. Heritage House. ISBN 978-1-894974-87-5.
- Beckett, Harry (2003). Alberta. Weigl Educational. ISBN 978-1-894705-00-4.
- Melnyk, George (1998). The Literary History of Alberta Volume One: From Writing-on-Stone to World War Two. University of Alberta. ISBN 978-0-88864-296-7. The Literary History of Alberta: Volume One at the Internet Archive
- Melnyk, George (1998). The Literary History of Alberta Volume Two: From the End of the War to the End of the Century. University of Alberta. ISBN 978-0-88864-324-7. The Literary History of Alberta: Volume Two at the Internet Archive
- Tupper, Allan; Gibbins, Roger (1992). Government and Politics in Alberta. University of Alberta. ISBN 978-0-88864-243-1.
- Otter, A. A. den (1986). Civilizing the West: The Galts and the Development of Western Canada. University of Alberta. ISBN 978-0-88864-111-3.
