= Oldman River valley parks system =

Group of parks in Alberta, Canada

Coordinates: 49.6955°N 112.8609°W

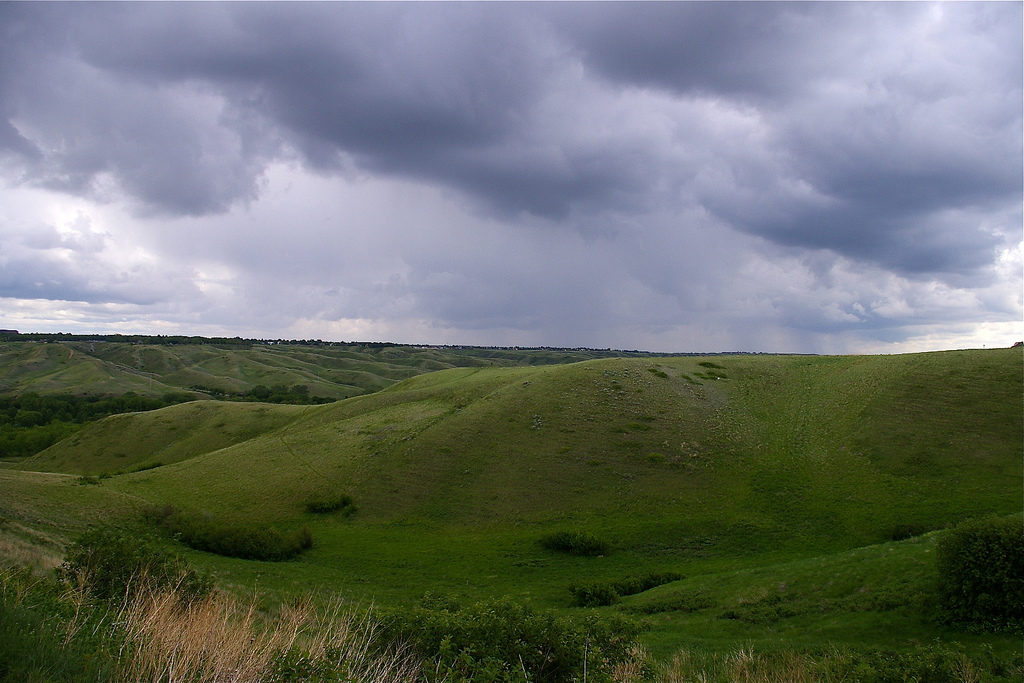
Old Man River valley during a thunderstorm

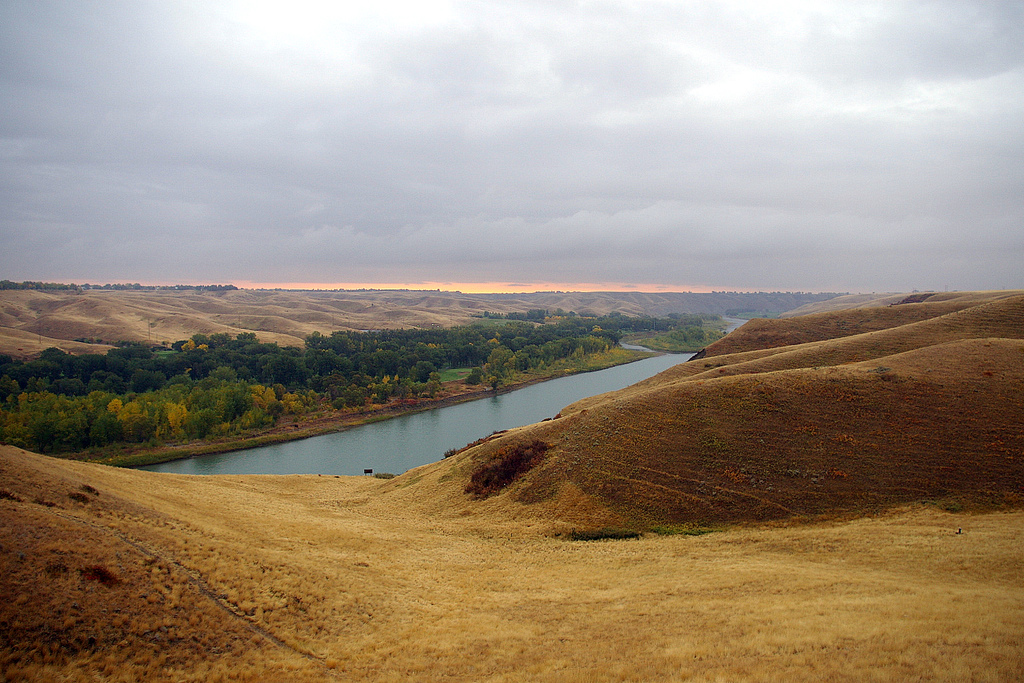
Old Man River valley at sunrise

Map of Lethbridge showing parks

The Oldman River valley parks system is a continuous collection of eight urban parks in the Oldman River valley of Lethbridge, Alberta, 100 metres (330 ft) below the prairie level. The parks were created in the 1980s as part of the city's Urban Parks Project. Today, they are a combined 16 square kilometres (6.2 mi^{2}) in size and comprise one of the largest urban park systems in North America, and the third largest in Canada.

== Parks ==
Eight parks make up the system:

- Alexander Wilderness Park
- Botterill Bottom Park
- Bull Trail Park
- Elizabeth Hall Wetlands
- Indian Battle Park
- Nature Reserve
- Peenaquim Park
- Popson Park

Pavan Park and Cottonwood Park are in the river valley, but are separated from the rest of the system.

== Amenities ==
The park system contains campgrounds, playgrounds, eating areas and several kilometres of cyclist/pedestrian trails, including part of the Coal Banks Trail system. Well-known attractions in the system include Fort Whoop-Up, Helen Schuler Nature Centre and the High Level Bridge. A golf course is adjacent to Elizabeth Hall Wetlands.

== Wildlife ==
Various wildlife live in the park system, including deer, hawks, owls, rabbits, snakes, fox, coyotes, badgers, porcupines, pelicans, beavers, muskrats, ground squirrels and cranes.

== Vegetation ==
Tree species native to the Old Man River valley are Populus deltoides, Populus balsamifera and Populus angustifolia. These three species interbreed, producing a very diverse forest with varying leaf shapes and branch patterns. Southern Alberta is the only area where these three specific poplar species are known to hybridize.

== History ==
People began to settle in the river valley in the late 19th century, and by 1884, the population was about 250. The next year, many of the families had moved to the prairie level, with more leaving after serious floods in 1902 and 1908. The area was subdivided in 1912, and 83 families settled in the community, which was called Riverside, by the early 1950s. After a serious flood in 1953, Lethbridge City Council moved all the families out of the valley and designated it as parkland recreation.

Indian Battle Park had been created by 1960, and the Lethbridge Nature Reserve was established near Indian Battle Park in the mid-1970s. The Lethbridge Naturalists Society and Public School Board built a nature centre in 1980, which was formally opened in 1982 as the Helen Schuler Coulee Centre. This name was changed to the Helen Schuler Nature Centre in 2009.

Beginning in 1981, the City of Lethbridge purchased new parkland using funds from Urban Parks for the Future, a project run by the provincial government and funded by the Heritage Trust Fund. Such parks include: Pavan Park, Alexander Wilderness Park, Peenaquim Park, Lethbridge Nature Reserve and Elizabeth Hall Wetlands, Indian Battle Park, Bull Trail Park, Botterill Bottom Park, and Popson Park.
