= Coal Banks Trail =

Recreational path in Alberta, Canada

Coordinates: 49.699°N 112.81°W

Coal Banks Trail is a 30-kilometre multipurpose recreational path in Lethbridge, Alberta, Canada. It connects all of the city's major urban parks, all three geographical areas, and many smaller parks. While primarily a community recreation opportunity, the trail is also used for community events, such as the Terry Fox Run and the Moonlight Run.

The city's Parks and Recreation department maintains the citywide system, which was designed to connect the Oldman River valley with other areas of the city, including Pavan Park in the north and Henderson Park in the east. The system now reaches Highways 4 and 5 in the south and a loop in West Lethbridge (including University Drive and McMaster Blvd).

== History ==
Named after the original settlement in the river valley, most of the original trail was built between 1984 and 1987 as part of the city's Urban Parks Project. The 7 km expansion around West Lethbridge was completed in 1996.

In the late 1980s, repeated floods of the Oldman River washed out a causeway section near the Lethbridge Country Club golf course. Unable to obtain approval from the federal government to rebuild the section, Lethbridge City Council decided to build a link to 4 St and Scenic Drive South in 2004.

== Parks serviced ==
- Botterill Bottom Park
- Bull Trail Park
- Helen Schuler Nature Reserve
- Henderson Park
- Indian Battle Park
- Nicholas Sheran Park
- Pavan Park

== See also ==
- Transportation in Lethbridge
