= Nicholas Sheran =

Nicholas Sheran (1841–1882) was an entrepreneur born in New York City. He spent his early years apprenticing as a printer, working on Arctic whalers, and serving in the United States Army.

== History ==
After his service in the American Civil War, Sheran followed a fellow soldier (Joseph Healy, a member of the Kainai Nation who was adopted by the Healy family) to Montana where he worked as a prospector and trader. In 1870, he went north in search of gold to Fort Whoop-Up, a whiskey-trading post started by Healy's older adoptive brother John J Healy near what is now Lethbridge, Alberta where he found coal instead.

While in the area, Sheran started a ferry service across the Belly River (now Oldman). In addition, he also mined coal from a seam in the nearby coulees and sold it to traders who came to the fort. With this, Sheran was responsible for the creation of Alberta's first commercial coal mine. He was able to sell his coal for $5 a ton according to a later newspaper article; but according to this historical document it went for $3/ton at the site, $15/ton at Fort McLeod, and $22/ton at Fort Benton.

From 1878 to 1882, Sheran lived common-law with a Peigan woman named Mary Brown, and they had two sons together: Charles and William. Sheran drowned the May before his second son was born. In 1899, the Supreme Court for the North-West Territories ruled that Sheran's two sons were ineligible to inherit his estate. This ruling was made because the court believed Sheran could have legally married Mary Brown, but did not.

== Namesakes ==
A park, leisure centre with ice rink and swimming pool, and an elementary school in Lethbridge are named after Sheran.
