= John Edward Schwitzer =

John Edward Schwitzer (April 1870 – January 1911) was assistant chief engineer for the Canadian Pacific Railway in the early 1900s. He was known for two major projects on the CPR, both that removed costly bottlenecks on the routes.

One of those was the Lethbridge Viaduct or High Level Bridge in Lethbridge, Alberta, which was built over the Oldman River valley to shorten the CP Crowsnest Line between Lethbridge and Fort Macleod by over 8 km. This eliminated a problematic series of smaller wood bridges used on the old route. A smaller bridge, similar to the one in Lethbridge, was built near Monarch, Alberta as part of the rerouting.

Another project which he is most noted for was the Spiral Tunnels, which eliminated the infamous Big Hill, where the mainline dropped on a 4.4% grade near Field, British Columbia. The tunnels allowed the grade to drop to 2.2%, making it a more safe and less-costly route.

Both projects were completed in 1909, months apart from each other. In January 1911, Schwitzer was appointed CP's Chief Engineer. However, he died of complications from pneumonia a few weeks later.
