= Lethbridge Dragon Boat Festival =

Annual event in Lethbridge, Alberta, Canada

Lethbridge Dragon Boat Festival is a dragon boat festival held annually in Lethbridge, Alberta, Canada.

== Overview ==
The festival, held every July since 2002 at Henderson Park (except 2020), attracts over 60 teams from British Columbia, Alberta, Saskatchewan, and Montana consisting of over 1600 participants. The three-day festival is the largest dragon boat festival in Alberta, and it includes not only the dragon boat races but entertainment, vendors, and beer gardens.

2020 saw the festival go on hiatus until 2021.

== See also ==
- List of festivals in Lethbridge
- List of festivals in Alberta
