= Flag of Lethbridge =

Canadian municipal flag

Lethbridge
- Proportion: 1:2
- Adopted: March 22, 1971
- Designed by: Alex Johnston

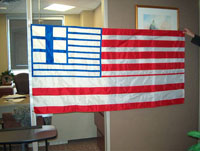
Photograph of the flag

The flag of Lethbridge is the official flag of Lethbridge, Alberta, and was designed in 1967, the year of Canada's centennial. It is based on the American flag that was reportedly once flown at Fort Whoop-Up.

== History ==
As a result of the Canadian Centennial in 1967, there was a resurgence of interest in Canadian history. Part of the interest in Lethbridge centred on a municipal flag. Artist Alex Johnston used a photograph of the flag that flew at Fort Whoop-Up in the late 19th century as the basis for his rendition of the modern flag. He also used some contemporary written descriptions.

It was not until 1971, however, that the flag was adopted as the official municipal flag. On 22 March, the following city council resolution was discussed and later carried:

"And whereas because of its historical significance and uniqueness the Fort Whoop-Up Flag has become a symbol of Lethbridge representing not only its background, old of story of the influence of our neighbours to the south of Canada, as related to our native people, but also of a city that defied the rigorous climate, geography, and isolation, to become first a coal mining town, to a farm and ranching pioneering community, to the centre of Canada's irrigation farming, and now an industrial City with a future in education, culture, and a civilization built on an industrious multi-racial people upholding the principle of government under the rule of law, recognizing the worth and dignity of the individual and the right of all citizens to share in its future and the future of Canada, now therefore be it resolved that the Fort Whoop-Up Flag be now adopted as the official flag of the municipal corporation of the City of Lethbridge."

On April 11, 2005, a brief discussion was brought forward in a city council meeting regarding making changes to the flag in light of the city's centennial in 2006.
