= Nicholas Sheran Park Disc Golf Course =

Disc golf course in Alberta, Canada

Coordinates: 49.669722°N 112.883500°W

Nicholas Sheran Park Disc Golf Course is a public 18-hole disc golf course located in Nicholas Sheran Park, in Lethbridge, Alberta, Canada. It was designed by Craig Burrows-Johnson and originally built for the 2001 Alberta Seniors Games. The course is available to the public at no charge, on a first-come, first-served, walk-on basis. According to Alberta Disc Golf, with a total length of 2,693 metres (8,835 ft) from the blue tees, Nicholas Sheran Park Disc Golf Course is the longest disc golf course in Canada.

== Tournaments ==
As the home course of the Bridge City Gunners Disc Golf Club, the course hosted the 2-day, B-tier Spring Runoff competition in 2019. The event is part of the Alberta Tour Series.

== See also ==
List of disc golf courses in Alberta
