= Battle of the Belly River =

First Nations battle in what is now Alberta, Canada

Coordinates: 49.69391°N 112.86105°W

Date	October 25, 1870
Location	Present day Lethbridge, Alberta, Canada
Result	Decisive Blackfoot victory

Belligerents
Blackfoot Confederacy	Cree

Commanders and leaders
Big Leg; Black Eagle; Heavy Shield; Crow Eagle; Bull Back Fat; Button Chief	Big Bear; Little Pine; Little Mountain; Piapot

Strength
500–800 warriors	500–800 warriors

Casualties and losses
40 killed 50 wounded	200–400 killed

The Battle of the Belly River was the last major conflict between the Cree (the Iron Confederacy) and the Blackfoot Confederacy, and the last major battle between First Nations on Canadian soil.

== History ==
The battle took place within the present limits of the city of Lethbridge on the banks of the Oldman River, which was then called the Belly River. A devastating outbreak of smallpox had reduced the strength of the Blackfoot, and a Cree war party had come south in late October 1870 to take advantage of that weakness. An advance party of Crees had stumbled upon a Peigan camp and decided to attack instead of informing the main Cree body of their find.

The Blackfoot and the Cree were fighting to gain control of the Cypress Hills boundaries and in the fall of 1870 there was a battle between them called the "Battle of Belly River." Big Bear and Little Pine led the Crees and attacked a Blood First Nations camp. The next day, well armed Peigans entered the battle and defeated the Cree, approximately 200-400 Crees died in the battle. Eventually, the Cree and Blackfoot negotiated peace and access to the Cypress hills.

Soon word passed to other Blackfoot, Blood and Peigan camps in the immediate area, and warriors were sent to join battle. After several hours of trading shots, a Blackfoot party gained the high ground and made the Cree positions untenable. The retreat became a rout, and up to 300 Cree warriors were killed trying to make their escape.

More significant than the outcome of the battle is the fact that it is perhaps the best-covered inter-tribal fighting of all time given the number of eyewitnesses it produced. Above all, it is believed to be the last significant inter-tribal battle in North America. The clash does not refer to a single organized engagement but consists of many scattered encounters in the valley of the Oldman River. The Blackfoot, after having significantly reduced their numbers in a ghastly smallpox epidemic that killed over 2,200 of their people, repulsed the Cree and Assiniboine attackers, who had hoped to exploit the incidence by launching a full-scale raid against the Blackfoot.

Approximately a year after the battle, the Cree and Blackfoot made a formal peace. That was formalized by Crowfoot, a Blackfoot chief, ritually adopting Poundmaker, an up-and-coming Cree leader in 1873. Treaty No.7, between the Blackfoot Confederacy and the Crown, was signed in 1877. In 1906, the town of Lethbridge was founded near the battle site. The battle itself is commemorated in Indian Battle Park.

After the battle, the region’s politics changed. In January 1871, just months after the fight, the Cree extended an olive branch to the Blackfoot with a gift of tobacco and an informal peace. That was formalized in the fall of the same year on the Red Deer River. A monument in Wetaskiwin now commemorates the peace between the Blackfoot and Cree Nations. The battle marked the end of inter-tribal warfare and the beginning of a new era of cooperation between the First Nations, a peace that has lasted to this day.

== See also ==
- Fort Whoop-Up
- Jerry Potts
