= Nicholas Sheran Park =

Park in Lethbridge, Alberta, Canada

Coordinates: 49.6701°N 112.8801°W

Location of Nicholas Sheran Park in Lethbridge

Nicholas Sheran Park is an urban park in Lethbridge, Alberta, Canada, and is named after one of the city's founders, Nicholas Sheran. The largest park in West Lethbridge, it was conceptualised as a regional park in 1969, and constructed in 1974.

== Amenities ==
The 43 hectare (106 acre) park includes a man-made lake and has 5.8 km (3.6 mi.) of walking trails, which connect with the Coal Banks Trail. The lake is stocked with trout every year and is a popular fishing spot. Non-motorised boating is allowed in the summer, and ice skating is allowed in the winter, weather permitting.

Another main attraction is the 18-hole disc golf course. Originally built for the 2001 Alberta Seniors Games, the course is available to the public at no charge, on a first-come, first-served, walk-on basis.

The park also includes a large playground area, a picnic facility, baseball diamonds, a soccer field and basketball hoops. In addition, the Nicholas Sheran Leisure Centre Pool, the Nicholas Sheran Ice Centre, and the Gyro Spray Ground water park are across the street from the park.
