= William Lethbridge =

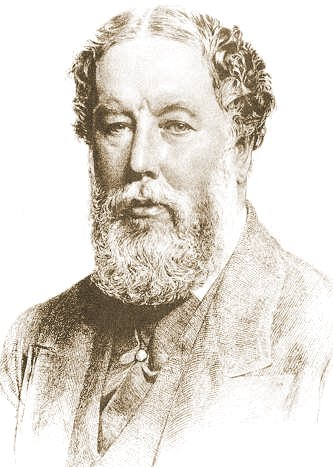
William Lethbridge, 1825–1901, after whom the City of Lethbridge was named.

William Lethbridge (1825–1901) was a lawyer in England. When bookseller W H Smith owner William Henry Smith II decided to become involved in politics in 1864, he enlisted Lethbridge as a managing partner of WH Smith. He sat for a portrait by Frederick Sandys (1829–1904) in 1882 (see illustration).

Lethbridge was the first president of North Western Coal and Navigation Company, a mining company based out of Lethbridge, Alberta, in 1882. The city of Lethbridge was named after him, by Alexander Tilloch Galt in an effort to convince him to invest in the new company. However, Lethbridge never went to Canada.
