= Henderson Park (Lethbridge) =

Park in Lethbridge, Canada

Coordinates: 49.68646°N 112.79631°W

Henderson Lake in Henderson Park

Henderson Park is a 47 hectare (117 acre) park located in Lethbridge, Alberta, Canada. The park contains many amenities and attractions, including a 24 hectare (60 acre) man-made lake, the largest lake in the city. Several annual events are held in the park.

== History ==
Henderson Lake was originally a slough, but Mayor William Henderson, after whom the lake and park are named, was instrumental in developing the lake and surrounding park in preparation for the 7th International Dry-Farming Congress in 1912.

== Amenities ==
Location of Henderson Park in Lethbridge
- Henderson Lake Playground: - A large, colourful playground with a soft Foam ground covering the entire play area. The playground is near the P-2 parking lot, the boat dock, and the boat ramp.
- Group picnic shelters: - In addition to the Henderson Horseshoe Pit, there are three other group picnic areas: Kiwanis, Kinsmen and Gunnery.
- Henderson Campground: - This year-round campground is located just east of the park on Parkside Drive. Amenities include full and partial hookup sites, washrooms, laundromat, store, playground and a sani-dump. This is now closed and no longer available.
- Henderson Horseshoe Pit: - At the west end of the park and near the pool, this fenced facility has 10 horseshoe pitches. It also doubles as a group picnic area with a kitchen and a large tent shelter. This facility is available between May and October.
- Henderson Lake: This 24 hectare (60 acre) man-made lake provides boating and fishing opportunities from spring to fall, as well as the annual Lethbridge Dragon Boat Festival.
- Henderson Lake Golf Course: - Since 1911, this public, 18-hole golf course has been located along the south shore of Henderson Lake.
- Henderson Outdoor Pool: - Opened in 1962, the clover-shaped swimming pool is one of the city's only outdoor pools and includes a sand volleyball court. It is open from the end of June until the end of August.
- Henderson Park Ice Centre: - Located on the north side of Henderson Park, a full-size and mini size rink is available for private rentals from September to early April. The centre seats 700 and hosts tournaments.
- Spitz Stadium: - This lighted baseball stadium is home to the Lethbridge Bulls and seats more than 3000 people.
- Henderson Tennis Courts: - Operated by the Lethbridge Tennis Club, this facility includes a clubhouse and six lighted Plexi-Pave tennis courts.
- Nikka Yuko Japanese Garden: - Built in 1967 as a symbol of Japanese-Canadian friendship, this 3.75-acre (15,200 m^{2}) landscape garden features elements of five traditional Japanese gardens. It is open from mid-May to mid-October.
- Rose Garden: - Situated in the northwest corner of the park, the garden was originally developed with the Girl Guides, and it is a popular area for wedding photos.
- Trails: Facilities in the park are connected by paved trails, available for walking, jogging, cycling and in-line skating. The two largest trails circumvent the lake (2.8 km) and the park's perimeter (4.3 km). The citywide Coal Banks Trail runs through the park.
