= Lethbridge Viaduct =

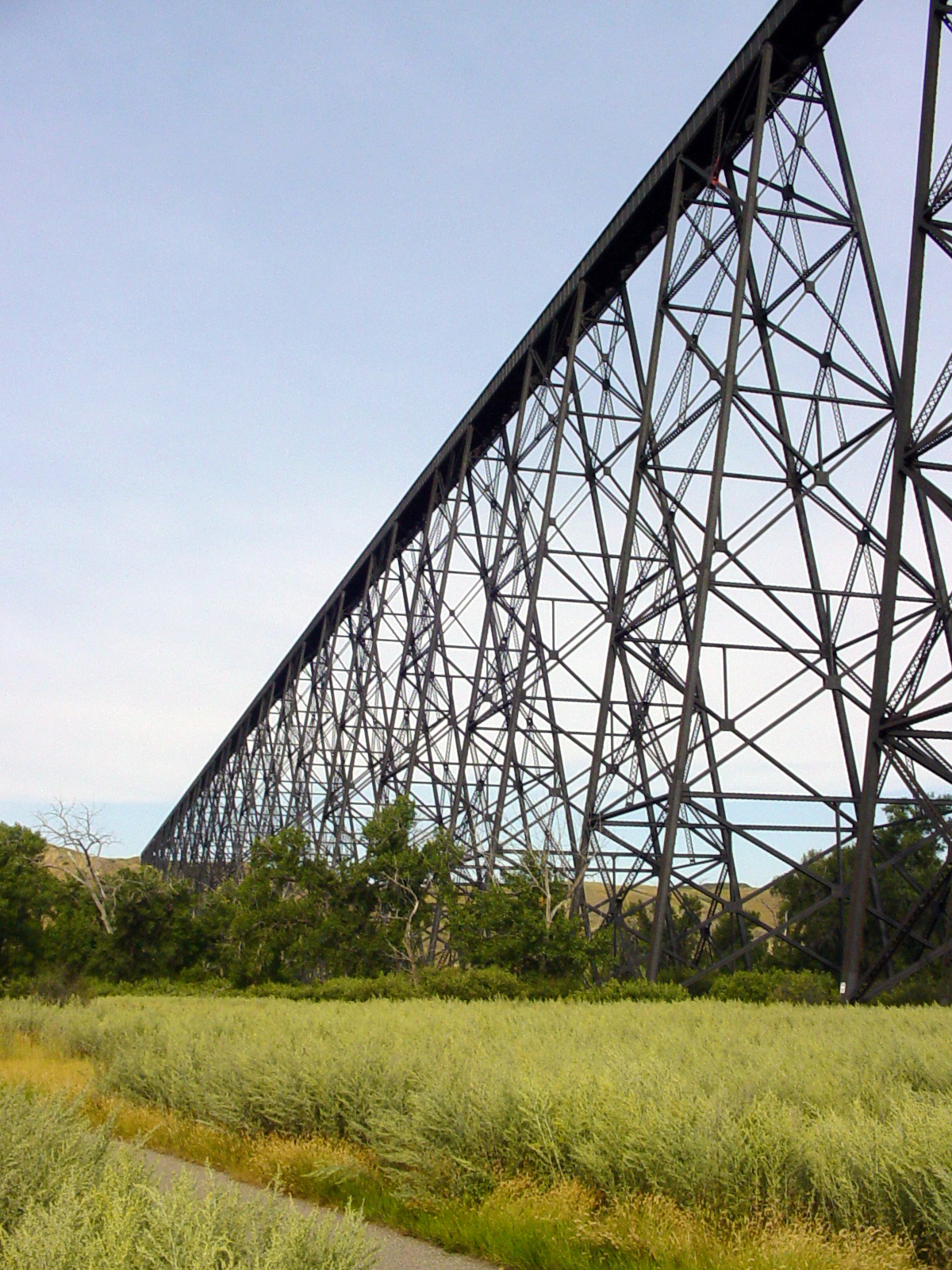
- Coordinates: 49°41′51″N 112°52′7″W
- Carries: Railway
- Crosses: Oldman River
- Locale: Lethbridge, Alberta, Canada
- Official name: Lethbridge Viaduct
- Maintained by: Canadian Pacific Kansas City

Characteristics
- Total length: 1,624 m
- Width: 32.6 m
- Height: 95.7 m

History
- Opened: 1909; 117 years ago

Location
- Interactive map of Lethbridge Viaduct

The Lethbridge Viaduct, commonly known as the High Level Bridge, is a railway trestle bridge over the Oldman River in Lethbridge, Alberta, Canada. Constructed between 1907 and 1909 by the Canadian Pacific Railway, it is the largest railway structure in Canada and the largest of its type in the world, and is still regularly maintained and used over a century since its construction.

In 2005, the construction of the viaduct was recognized as an event of national historic significance.

== History ==
Location of Lethbridge Viaduct in Lethbridge

Prior to the Lethbridge Viaduct, the main railway crossing over the Oldman River was a wooden trestle measuring 894 m (2,933 ft) long and 20 m (66 ft) high. The trestles on the original line out of Lethbridge totalled 4.5 km (2.8 mi). Many railways in the area went through the Crowsnest Pass between Lethbridge and Fort Macleod, over steep grades that hampered operations. In addition, extensive cuts and many other bridges were needed to cross various creeks and coulees. Past the St. Mary River crossing, several large cuts and large bridges were also required, including a 270 m (900 ft) trestle with a 61 m (200 ft) span west of the St. Mary River, a 180 m (600 ft) trestle at Eight-Mile Coulee, and another of 270 m (900 ft) in length near Eight-Mile Coulee. At Sixteen-Mile Coulee there was a 240 m (800 ft) trestle, 41 m (133 ft) high with a 61 m (200 ft) truss span over the creek.

Although the original route accomplished its purpose in allowing the CPR to rapidly complete the railway, it turned out to be expensive to operate. The original bridges were designed to last only about 10 years. In 1905, the CPR decided, to construct a completely new route on a better gradient to bypass the original line. The new line was built to the north of the Oldman River. It required two bridges, one in Lethbridge over the Oldman River, and another large bridge over the Oldman River again west of Monarch. This route eliminated many curves and reduced the grade from 1.2 percent to only 0.4 percent. It also saved 8.47 km (5.26 mi) of track.

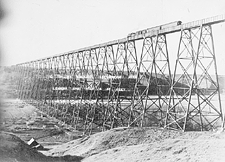
The Lethbridge Viaduct in 1910

The Lethbridge Viaduct was designed by the CPR's bridge department in Montreal, Quebec. Construction began in the summer of 1907, directed by CPR's Assistant Chief Engineer John Edward Schwitzer. Clearing and grading the site, construction of piers, and placement of the footings progressed while the steelwork was being prefabricated. The steelwork was manufactured by the Canadian Bridge Company of Walkerville, Ontario. Raising the steelwork began in mid-August 1908 and was performed by around 100 workers. Transport of the steel to the site required 645 railway cars while another 40 were needed to bring in equipment. Once the steelwork reached track level at the Lethbridge end, it was possible to begin assembly using a huge travelling crane called an "erection traveller", which was built on site at a cost of $100,000 and was used to lower the steel beams and girders into place. The last girder was placed in June 1909 and riveting was completed in August 1909. The total cost of the Lethbridge Viaduct's construction was $1,334,525.

== Specifications ==
- Length: 1,623.860 m (5,327 ft 7 1/2 in)
- Height: 96 m (314 ft) above river bed
- Materials: 11,200 tonnes (12,400 short tons) of steel
- Deck spans and lengths:
  - 44 plate girder spans each of 20.45 m (67 ft 1 in)
  - 22 plate girder spans each of 30.12 m (98 ft 10 in)
  - one riveted lattice-truss of 33 m (107 ft)
- Rigid braced steel towers: total of 33

The second bridge over the Oldman River, near Monarch, is 580 m (1,890 ft) long and 46 m (150 ft) high.

== In popular culture ==
The Lethbridge Viaduct appears in the 4th episode of the 2023 TV series The Last of Us. Through videographic editing, the bridge is depicted as abandoned for decades and collapsed in the middle.

== See also ==
- List of bridges in Canada
