= John Healy (entrepreneur) =

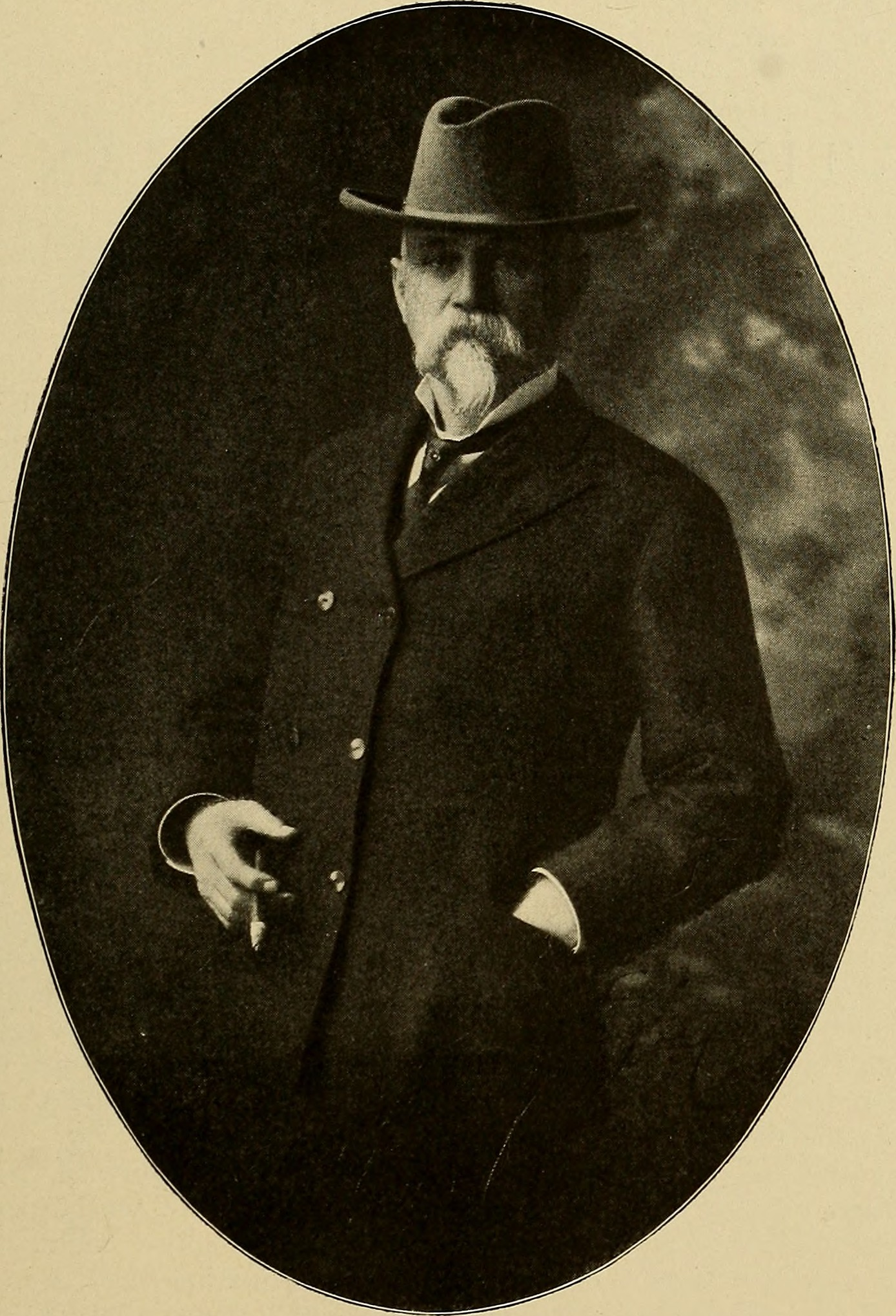
- Born: John J. Healy; 1840
- Died: 1908 (aged 67–68)
- Occupation: Entrepreneur

John J. Healy (c. 1840–1908) was an Irish-American entrepreneur in the late 19th century, who also operated in Canada at various times. His pioneering business activities ranged from Montana to Alberta/BC, Canada and to Alaska/Yukon.

Originating from a base of operations in Montana, he and Alfred B. Hamilton established a whiskey trading post near present-day Lethbridge, Alberta in 1869. The post was originally named after Hamilton, but a second, larger post nearby was given the name of Fort Whoop-Up.

Healy sold the fort to Dave Akers in 1876.

He then took up work as the sheriff of Chouteau County in Montana, a newspaper editor and a businessman in Fort Benton, Montana.

Healy moved to the North, operating a trading post at Dyea, Alaska. He later moved to Yukon Territory to operate a transportation company during the Klondike Gold Rush.

Healy died in 1908 as a rich and famous man.

He was buried in Seattle, Washington.

== Legacy ==
Healy, Alaska and Healy Pass in the Alberta Rockies are named after him.

== Bibliography ==
- Birth of a Community: Water the Key to Development
- Healy's West: The Life and Times of John J. Healy
