= Fort Whoop-Up =

Human settlement in Lethbridge County, Alberta, Canada

- Fort Hamilton
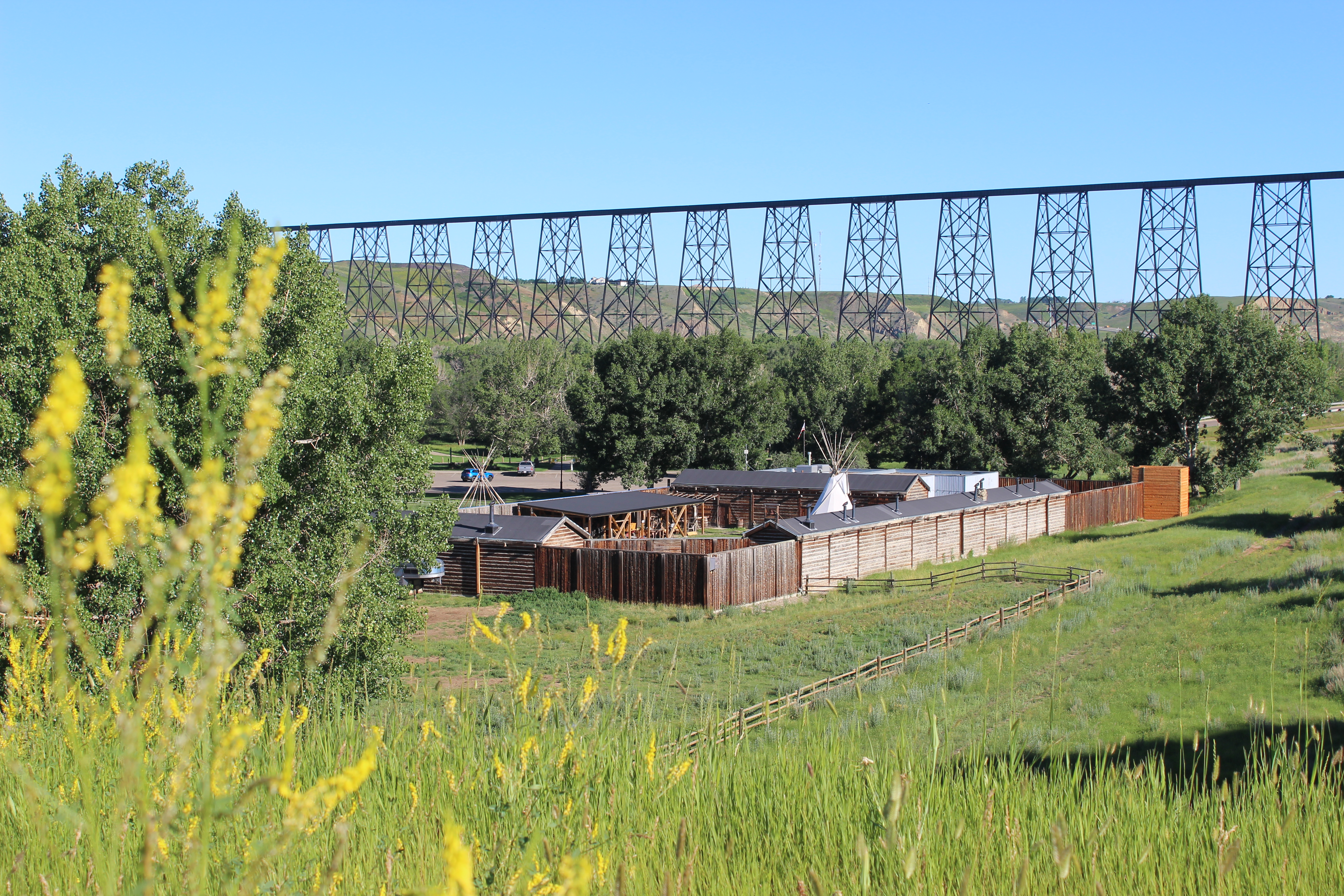

- Location within Alberta
- 49°41′31″N 112°51′24″W
- Etymology: Nickname adopted as official name
- Location: Alberta, Canada
- Nearest city: Lethbridge

History
- Founder: J.J. Healy, A.B. Hamilton
- Built: 1869
- Original use: Fur and Whisky Trading
- Demolished: 1915
- Rebuilt: 1967
- Event(s): Battle of the Belly River, NWMP March West 1874

Site notes
- Area: 1.6 km^{2} (5/8 sq mi)
- Architect: William S. Gladstone
- Owner: City of Lethbridge
- Website: fort.galtmuseum.com

Fort Whoop-Up, originally Fort Hamilton, was a whisky trading post near what is now Lethbridge, Alberta, Canada. During the late 19th century, the post served as a centre for trading activities, including the illegal whisky trade. The sale of whisky was outlawed but, due to the lack of law enforcement in the region prior to 1874, many whisky traders had settled in the area and taken to charging unusually high prices for their goods.

Fort Whoop-Up, originally a nickname which was eventually adopted as the official name, is also the name of a replica site and interpretive centre built in Indian Battle Park.

== Construction ==
Fort Hamilton was first built in 1869 by John J. Healy and Alfred B. Hamilton—two traders who had done business in the Fort Benton area of Montana and in the basin of the Upper Missouri—to serve as a trading post. Fort Hamilton was originally a group of 11 cabins. The traders in these cabins traded for $50,000 worth of buffalo robes in just six months of operations. This first fort was destroyed by fire within a year of its construction by an overturned lamp. Whether this was an accident or arson is unknown.

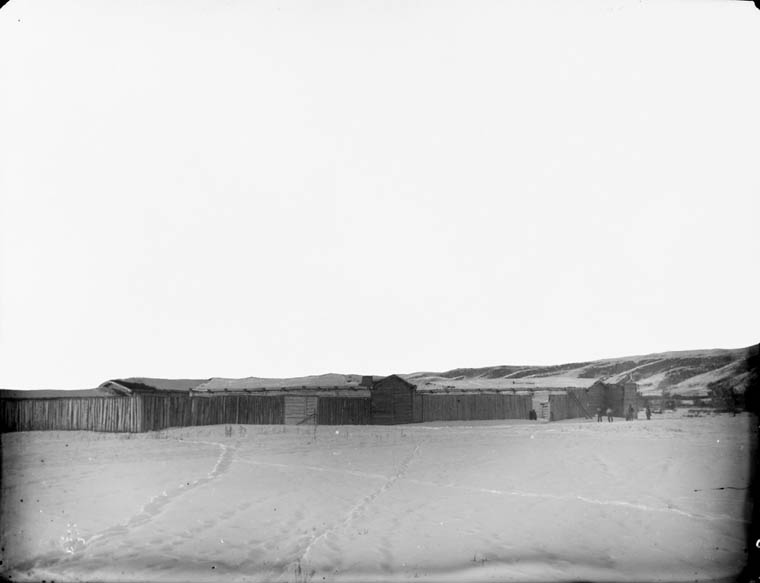
Fort Whoop-Up in 1881

Healy and Hamilton contracted James Gladstone and a crew of 30 workers to construct a second, more secure fort, which was later nicknamed Fort Whoop-Up. It took two years to build at a cost of $25,000. When it was finished, Fort Whoop-Up was "a squared timber post complete with a stockade, cannon-mounted bastions, loopholes for firing rifles, and three wickets for trading with the aboriginals." According to Healy, the new fort was built with six thousand cottonwood logs.

Fort Whoop-Up was located at the junction of the Belly (Oldman) River and the St. Mary's River, 6 km (3 3/4 mi) south of where the Fort Whoop-Up interpretive centre is located.

== Trade and enforcement ==
One type of alcohol sold by the whisky traders in and around Whoop-Up bandits was known as Whoop-Up Bug Juice, a highly prized alcohol spiked with ginger, molasses, and red pepper. It was then coloured with black chewing tobacco, watered down, and boiled to make "firewater".

The spread of American traders from Fort Benton north into Canada was spurred by the enforcement of prohibition in Montana in 1869. Traders, like Healy and Hamilton, brought their stockpile of whisky to Canada to continue their lucrative trade. While whisky was a foundational trading item at Fort Whoop-Up and other trading posts, there was much legal trading that occurred, such as trading blankets, food, firearms, or ammunition for buffalo robes.

The outlaws of Fort Whoop-Up and surrounding areas—combined with the supposed flying of an American flag over Canadian territory—contributed to the formation of the North-West Mounted Police (NWMP). Fort Whoop-Up was a destination on their March West in 1874.

The NWMP arrived at Fort Whoop-Up in October 1874, with the task of establishing Canadian sovereignty in the territory and controlling the alcohol trade. They found no whisky on the premises and the flag that had been reported as an American flag was inspected and found to be a trade flag for the fort (later adopted by the City of Lethbridge as the municipal flag). Finding no reason to close the fort, they continued further west and the fort continued in the trade of legal goods.

Their first strike on the alcohol traders came after a Peigan chief named Three Bulls complained at Fort Macleod about a group of whisky traders who had sold him overpriced whisky. Shortly after, the NWMP caught and fined the perpetrators, although they were not at Fort Whoop-Up at the time. Although the presence of the NWMP decreased the abundance of whisky trading, it still occurred.

In 1875, the NWMP rented a room from the owners of the fort, Healy and Hamilton, and established a post there. This arrangement lasted for at least twelve years, the fort acting as both a trading post and a NWMP post. The following year, Healy and Hamilton sold the fort to Dave Akers, who was in control of the fort almost until its demise. The fort was again burned in 1888, the fire having started in the NWMP barracks. This fire was not as severe as only the NWMP barracks were destroyed. The fort remained in operation until it was deserted somewhere between 1890 and 1892. It was then destroyed piece by piece until the last of it was washed away in a flood in 1915.

On 28 June 1985 Canada Post issued 'Fort Whoop Up, Alta.' one of the 20 stamps in the "Forts Across Canada Series" (1983 & 1985). The stamps are perforated 12 1/2 mm × 13 mm (31/64 in × 33/64 in) and were printed by Ashton-Potter Limited based on the designs by Rolf P. Harder.

== Name ==
There are several theories as to why the fort was nicknamed Whoop-Up. The most prominent is that it came by a description of the illicit activities that were taking place at the fort: that people said they were going to Fort Hamilton to whoop it up. Another theory comes from the process of getting a bull train moving over the trail. The bull whacker would walk alongside the bull train and crack his whip. This process was called whooping them up, which may have led to naming the trail from Fort Benton, Montana the Whoop-Up Trail, and hence the fort as well.

== Reconstruction ==
Logo of the Fort Whoop-Up interpretive site

A reconstruction-effort was undertaken to adapt the fort to what it was originally, based on new photographic evidence. The replica site was built as a centennial project, downstream from the original site, in 1967. Since then, various new exhibits have been unveiled, including the Thunderchief Collection, showcasing artifacts from the local Blackfoot culture; the Shockley Firearms Gallery; and Voice from the Past, an audio program that enables visitors and school children to receive guided tours year round. Seasonal re-enactments take place in the summer involving characters from the fort's history, and are done in partnership with Drama Nutz Productions and Guns of the Golden West, as well as local re-enactment talent.
