= Oldman River =

River in Alberta, Canada

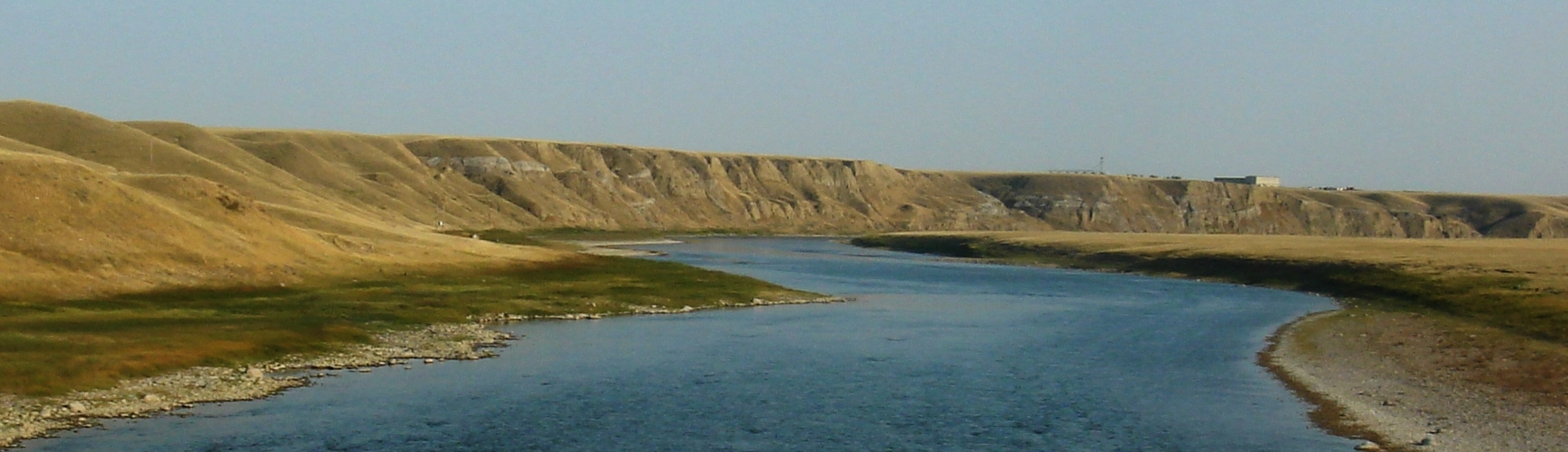
- Oldman River seen from Veterans Memorial Highway

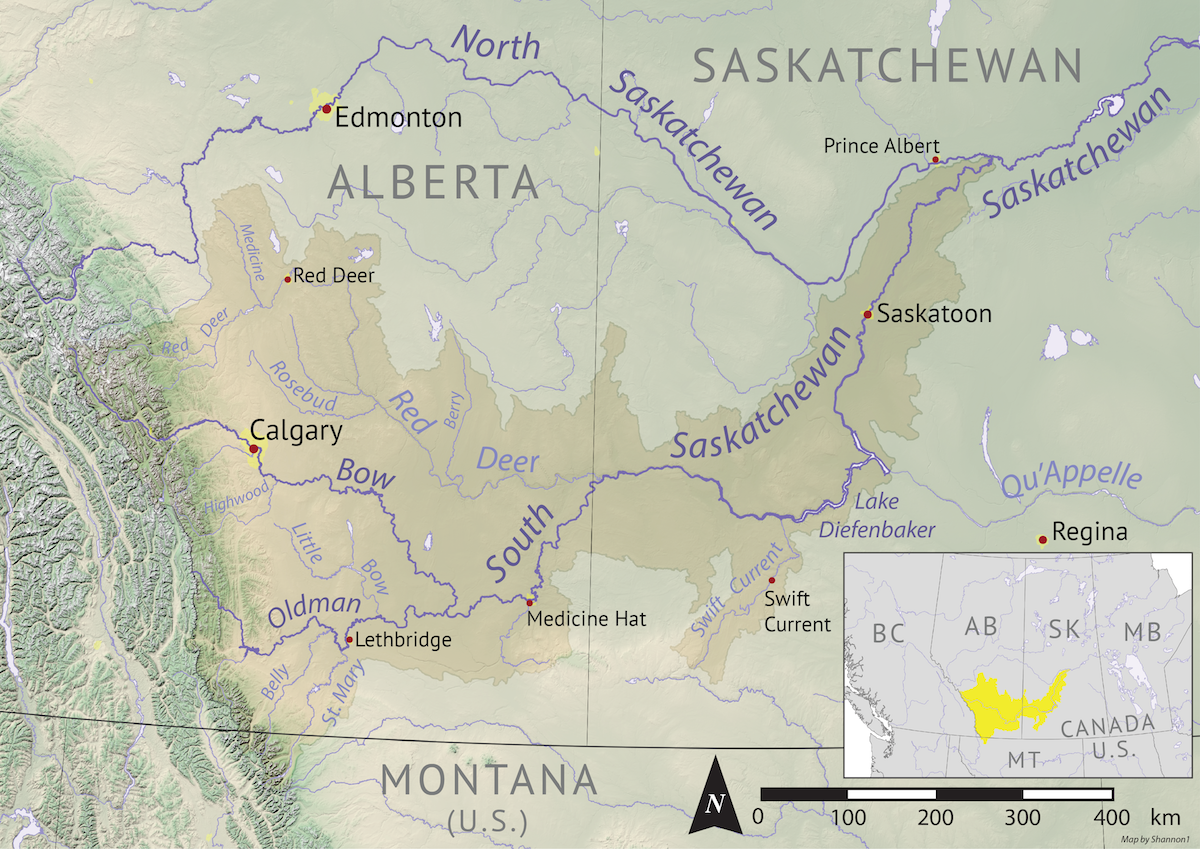
- The South Saskatchewan River drainage basin

- The mouth in Alberta Oldman River (Canada)

Location
- Country: Canada
- Province: Alberta

Physical characteristics
- Source
  - location: Canadian Rockies
  - coordinates: 50°06′50″N 114°43′14″W
  - elevation: 2,100 m (6,900 ft)
- Mouth
  - location: South Saskatchewan River
  - coordinates: 49°55′45″N 111°41′27.4″W
  - elevation: 701 m (2,300 ft)
- Length: 363 km (226 mi)
- Basin size: 26,700 km^{2} (10,300 sq mi)
- Discharge
  - average: 95 m^{3}/s (3,400 cu ft/s)

The Oldman River is a river in southern Alberta, Canada. It flows roughly west to east from the Rocky Mountains, through the communities of Fort Macleod, Lethbridge, and on to Grassy Lake, where it joins the Bow River to form the South Saskatchewan River, which eventually drains into the Hudson Bay.

Oldman River has a total length of 362 kilometres (225 mi) and a drainage area of 26,700 km^{2} (10,300 sq mi).

== Etymology ==
The river is named after Napi, a figure in Blackfoot mythology, who is also referred to as the "Old Man."

== History ==
The Oldman River was, at one time, known as the Belly River. The Belly River is now a separate river that is a tributary of the Oldman.

In 1991, the Alberta government finished construction of the Oldman River Dam. The Piikani activist Milton Born With A Tooth had attempted to divert the Oldman River away from the Lethbridge Northern Irrigation District canal intake. This led to an armed standoff and his eventual imprisonment. The dam was constructed where the Oldman, Crowsnest, and Castle river systems converge.

== 2013 floods ==
On June 21, 2013, during the 2013 Alberta floods Alberta experienced heavy rainfall that triggered catastrophic flooding throughout much of the southern half of the province along the Bow, Elbow, Highwood and Oldman rivers and tributaries. A dozen municipalities in Southern Alberta declared local states of emergency on June 21 as water levels rose and numerous communities were placed under evacuation orders.

== Tributaries ==
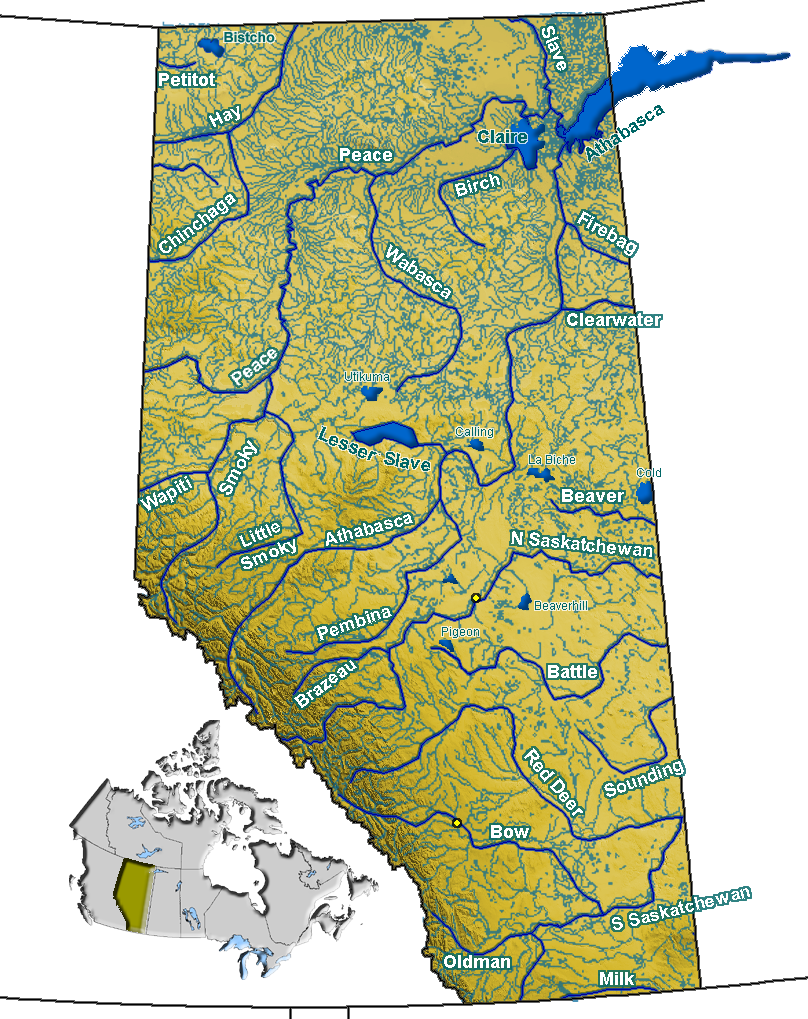
Oldman River in Alberta

From headwaters to mouth, Oldman River receives:

- Livingstone River
- Crowsnest River
- Castle River
- Pincher Creek
- Beaver Creek
- Willow Creek
- Belly River
  - Waterton River
- St. Mary River
  - Lee Creek
- Little Bow River

== Nature ==
Oldman River originates in the Beehive Natural Area, an area of alpine tundra and old-growth spruce and fir forests. Downstream it flows through Bob Creek Wildland Provincial Park and Black Creek Heritage Rangeland. Oldman Dam and Oldman River are other Provincial Recreation Areas established along the river.

The river and some of its tributaries have formed coulees in Southern Alberta, and the strata revealed by these formations guide local prospectors to ammolite deposits.

=== Fish ===
The Oldman River contains fish species such as rainbow trout, cutthroat trout, bull trout, brown trout, hybrid trout species ("cutbow" rainbow and cutthroat cross), mountain whitefish, pike, walleye, lake sturgeon, catostomidae, goldeye, and minnows.

== See also ==
- Oldman Formation
- Oldman River valley parks system
- List of rivers of Alberta
