= Mayor Magrath Drive =

Road in Lethbridge, Alberta

- Maintained by: City of Lethbridge
- Length: 6.8 km (4.2 mi)
- Location: Lethbridge
- South end: Highway 5
- Major junctions: Scenic Drive; Crowsnest Trail (Highway 3)
- North end: 5 Avenue N

Mayor Magrath Drive is the busiest north–south roadway and the second busiest roadway overall in Lethbridge, Alberta. In 2011, it saw roughly 34,000 vehicles per day in weekday traffic. Most retail and hospitality establishments in the city are concentrated on this roadway, and it serves as a major transportation corridor for the city and region.

== Route description ==
Mayor Magrath Drive is central to transport in Lethbridge. It connects highways leading directly to the United States, British Columbia, and Saskatchewan. Several public transit routes follow the road, including the popular Link, which provides service between the Lethbridge College and Northside terminals. At the city limits Mayor Magrath Drive turns into Highway 5, which then continues to the Lethbridge County Airport.

Mayor Magrath Drive holds the bulk of the city's accommodations, including international chains such as Ramada, Best Western, Travelodge and Howard Johnson. Major shopping destinations (such as Walmart, Costco, Superstore, Safeway and Home Depot) are also located on this roadway, as well as a large number of restaurants.

Henderson Park borders on Mayor Magrath Drive and contains a golf course, the Nikka Yuko Japanese Garden, and Henderson Lake, the largest urban lake in the city.

In 2005, weekday traffic on Mayor Magrath Drive was recorded at 32,000 vehicles per day. Given that three provincial highways (3, 4 and 5) meet with the roadway, much of this traffic includes out-of-town tourists, commuters and truckers.

== History ==
Mayor Magrath Drive was built on a Canadian Pacific Railway line from Lethbridge to Fort Macleod that was abandoned when the High Level Bridge was constructed in 1909. Until the 1920s, the rural, gravel roadway was known as Sunshine Trail.

In 1946, Sunshine Trail was paved with asphalt for the first time. The following year, it was renamed Mayor Magrath Drive after Charles A. Magrath, the first mayor of Lethbridge.

The roadway was expanded to four lanes in 1963. This expansion also included a system of service roads and connecting avenues to provide access to future commercial and residential development. Between 2001 and 2004, the overburdened road was expanded to six lanes.

== Major intersections ==
The entire route is in Lethbridge.

km	mi	Destinations	Notes
0.0	0.0	Highway 5 south – Lethbridge Airport, Cardston, Waterton Park	Lethbridge city limits; Highway 5 continues south
0.0	0.0	Prairie Arbour Boulevard	
2.5	1.6	Scenic Drive / 24 Avenue S (Highway 5 north) to Highway 4 – City Centre	Highway 5 officially follows 24 Avenue S
4.2	2.6	10 Avenue S / Parkside Drive	To Chinook Regional Hospital
5.5– 5.9	3.4– 3.7	3 Avenue S – City Centre	
5.5– 5.9	3.4– 3.7	Crowsnest Trail (Highway 3) – Fort Macleod, Calgary, Medicine Hat	Interchange; former Highway 5 northern terminus
6.8	4.2	5 Avenue N / 23 Street N	Continues north as 23 Street N
1.000 mi = 1.609 km; 1.000 km = 0.621 mi: Concurrency terminus
