= Transportation in Lethbridge =

Transport for municipality in Alberta, Canada

There are many forms of transport in Lethbridge, Alberta, Canada, including highways and public transit. Lethbridge's airport is Lethbridge Airport (YQL), which is south of the city boundary. Lethbridge also has an intricate cycling-and-pedestrian pathway that meets several destinations in the city, including the urban park system in the Oldman River valley.

== Commuting ==
In 2003, Lethbridge College conducted a public opinion survey regarding commuting choice in Lethbridge. This survey found that less than 20% of Lethbridge residents regularly used the public transit system.

In 2006, the Lethbridge Public Library released a study that stated in part up to 130,000 people commute to Lethbridge from a radius of 100 km (62 mi). Since the local public transit system does not extend outside city boundaries, presumably these commuters use automobiles.

== Public transit ==
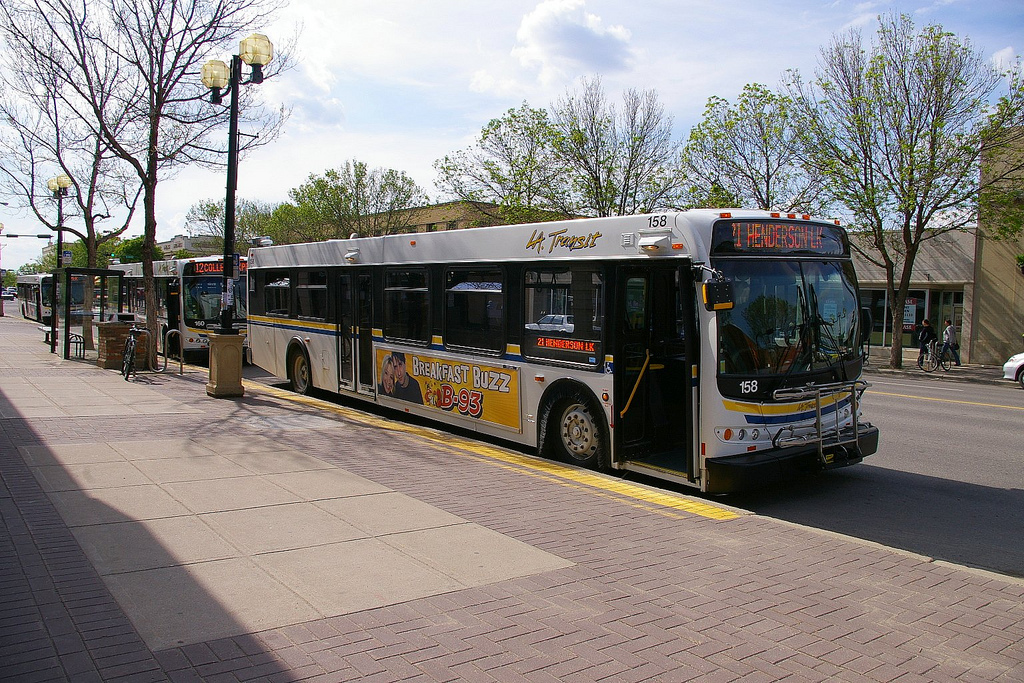
The downtown Lethbridge transit terminal allows the buses to stop curbside to transfer passengers between routes

Mass transit in Lethbridge consists of 40 buses (with an average age of 10 years) covering most of the city on 16 routes and managed by Lethbridge Transit. Traditionally, all bus routes in the city started and ended downtown. In the early 21st century, however, cross-town and shuttle routes were introduced. For example, there is now service from the University of Lethbridge to Lethbridge College, University of Lethbridge to the North Lethbridge terminal, and from Lethbridge College to the North Lethbridge terminal. Two of those routes make brief stops downtown.

The transit system does not use zone fares, and the cost of fare is the same regardless of the number of transfers made. Buses meet at four transit terminals: downtown, University of Lethbridge, Lethbridge College, and the North Lethbridge terminal. Although not a terminal, several routes also converge near the Chinook Regional Hospital.

In addition to the transit system, Lethbridge has several taxicab and limousine companies offering service throughout the city and to destinations outside city limits (including the Lethbridge Airport). Lethbridge also has a Red Arrow depot, providing bus service to Calgary.

== Coal Banks Trail system ==
The Parks and Recreation department maintains the citywide 30-kilometre (19 mi) pedestrian-and-cyclist Coal Banks Trail system (map). The system was designed to connect the Oldman River valley with other areas of the city, including Pavan Park in the north, Henderson Park in the east, Highways 4 and 5 in the south, and a loop in West Lethbridge (including University Drive and McMaster Blvd).

== Rail service ==
Lethbridge is very close to the CPR rail yards in Kipp. The rail yards were moved to Kipp, just west of the city, from downtown Lethbridge in 1983 to make way for commercial expansion.

The city is on a mainline of the Canadian Pacific Railway with trackage east to Toronto, south to the United States, west to Vancouver, and north to Calgary. Despite the marshalling yard being in Kipp, there are full freight-handling facilities in the city. In addition, spur trackage serves the industrial areas, and a rail-loading facility is available to all businesses.

Rail service in Lethbridge includes the well known Lethbridge Viaduct or High Level Bridge. It is one of the highest and longest steel railway truss bridges in the world.

Passenger rail service stopping in Lethbridge was discontinued in 1971 by CPR.

== Airport ==
The Lethbridge Airport provides commercial flights to Calgary, as well as private and charter flights to other destinations. The airport provides customs services for any flights coming in from the United States. The airport is 2 km (1 mi) south of the city, on Highway 5.

Lethbridge is 220 km (140 mi) from Calgary International Airport and 300 km (190 mi) from Great Falls International Airport, each of which provides commercial service to other destinations.

== Highways ==
Four provincial highways (3, 4, 5, and 25) run through or terminate in Lethbridge. This has led to the creation of major arterial roads (including Mayor Magrath Drive, University Drive and Scenic Drive) and an expressway (Crowsnest Trail). This, and the fact Lethbridge is on the CANAMEX Corridor, has led to Lethbridge being a major shipping destination, with over a dozen trucking firms having depots in the city.

Lethbridge is approximately 100 km (62 mi) north of the United States border via Highways 4 and 5; and 210 km (130 mi) south of Calgary via Highways 2 and 3. Highways 2, 3 and 4 form part of the CANAMEX trade route between Mexico, the United States, and Canada.

Highway 5 leads out to the Lethbridge Airport, satellite communities (such as Magrath and Welling), Waterton Lakes National Park, and the Canada-United States border via Highway 2. In the city limits, it intersects with Highway 4 and becomes Mayor Magrath Drive, which later intersects with Crowsnest Trail.

Highway 4 leads out to satellite communities (such as Stirling and Warner) and the Canada-United States border, where it meets Interstate 15, connecting eventually to Salt Lake City, Las Vegas and San Diego. In the city limits, it intersects with Highway 5 and becomes Scenic Drive, which later intersects with Whoop-Up Drive (the busiest road in Lethbridge) and Crowsnest Trail.

Highway 3—also known as the Crowsnest Highway—provides east–west service to British Columbia and Medicine Hat, where it meets up with the Trans-Canada Highway. Fort Macleod is only 51 km (32 mi) west of Lethbridge and provides service to Calgary via Highway 2. Several satellite communities (such as Coalhurst and Coaldale) are located on Highway 3. Of all the highways servicing Lethbridge, only Highway 3 does not terminate in the city.

Highway 25 provides service to satellite communities (such as Picture Butte and Diamond City). In the city, the highway turns into University Drive and services a major retail centre and the University of Lethbridge. It intersects with Whoop-Up Drive and the Crowsnest Highway.

A long-term plan would involve construction of a freeway bypass north and east of Lethbridge, from Monarch on existing Highway 3 east across Highway 25, the Oldman River, then south to cross Highway 3 between Coaldale and Lethbridge, and join Highway 4 southeast of Lethbridge. No timeline for construction has been established.

== Major roads ==
Lethbridge road network

The following are arterial and collector roads in Lethbridge. The numbers listed are the maximum number of vehicle traffic during weekdays for 2010. Only roads reaching at least 6,000 vehicles per day, which is the cut off for a "major collector" classification, are listed below.

Road	Type	Weekday traffic	Lanes
Whoop-Up Drive	Arterial	43,800	6
Mayor Magrath Drive	Arterial	32,600	6
Crowsnest Trail	Arterial	34,100	4
Stafford Drive	Arterial	21,800	4
Scenic Drive	Arterial	21,700	2–4
University Drive West	Arterial	25,400	4–6
13 Street	Arterial	19,600	2–4
6 Avenue South	Arterial	18,600	4
3 Avenue South	Arterial	18,400	4
43 Street	Super collector	16,000	2–4
2/2A Avenue North	Super collector	14,300	2
5 Avenue North	Super collector	14,000	2
McMaster Boulevard/Jerry Potts Boulevard	Super collector	13,200	2
1 Avenue South	Super collector	11,700	4
10 Avenue South/South Parkside Drive South	Super collector	10,700	2
20 Avenue South	Super collector	9,700	2–4
23 Street North	Super collector	9,500	2–4
9 Avenue North	Major collector	8,600	2
4 Avenue South	Super collector	8,400	4
16 Avenue South	Super collector	8,400	2
2/2A Avenue North	Super collector	14,300	2
26 Avenue North	Major collector	7,300	2
5 Avenue South	Major collector	6,500	4
Stafford Avenue/St. Edwards Boulevard/18 Avenue North/Park Boulevard	Major collector	6,500	2

=== Major infrastructure projects ===
Since 2000, several major infrastructure projects have been implemented in the city to accommodate current and planned traffic use. From 2001 to 2005, Mayor Magrath Drive, the second busiest roadway in Lethbridge, was upgraded to six lanes from 3 Avenue South to 34 Avenue South.

In 2006, Whoop-Up Drive, the busiest roadway in the city, was extended to 24 Avenue West. This extension provided direct service for the residential community of Sunset Acres and service for The Crossings, the planned commercial core of West Lethbridge, and the residential neighbourhood of Copperwood. In addition, University Drive was widened from Whoop-Up Drive to the location of the proposed sports arena, making the roadway six lanes in areas, including multiple turning lanes onto access roads for the University of Lethbridge.

In the fall of 2013, Scenic Drive was extended from 9th Avenue North to meet Stafford Drive North and continuing north out of the city. Current projects are improving capacity along a route comprising Mayor Magrath Drive North (from the CPR underpass to 5th Avenue), 5th Avenue North (from Mayor Magrath to 28th Street), and 28th Street North (from 5th Avenue northward).

In regard to future projects, discussions have taken place regarding the creation of Metis Trail in West Lethbridge (paralleling University Drive) and Chinook Trail, a ring-road intersecting with Crowsnest Trail on the Westside and connecting with 43 Street South in the east. Chinook Trail would include a third crossing of the Oldman River.
