= List of neighbourhoods in Lethbridge =

The City of Lethbridge, Alberta, Canada has over 30 neighbourhoods.

== Downtown ==
Downtown Lethbridge strictly speaking is bordered by the Oldman River valley on the west, Crowsnest Trail and the CPR rail line on the north, Stafford Drive (9 Street) on the east and 6 Avenue on the south. It is not very large and contains very little in neighbourhood structure. It is, however, home to Chinatown, a two block area on 2 Avenue, west of Galt Gardens.

The downtown core is also the commercial centre of the city, hosting most of the city's banks and several accounting and law practices, including national firms.

It also serves as a transportation hub. Whoop-Up Drive, the busiest roadway in Lethbridge, connects West Lethbridge to downtown. Scenic Drive also provides downtown with a connection to the United States via Highway 4 and the Lethbridge County Airport via Highway 5. Downtown also has two connections to the Crowsnest Highway, which provides direct access to British Columbia and indirect access to Calgary and Saskatchewan. The city's main transit terminal is downtown also; half of the city's bus routes converge on 4 Avenue.

== Neighbourhoods outside city centre by quadrant ==
Lethbridge is split into three geographical areas: north, south and west. West Lethbridge is separated from the other two by the Oldman River. North and South Lethbridge are separated by the Crowsnest Highway and the CPR rail line.

=== North Lethbridge ===
The north side was originally populated as a result of numerous coal mines in the area, and is home to multiple industrial parks.

- Hardieville (former hamlet annexed in 1978)
- BlackWolf
- Legacy Ridge
- Park Meadows
- Senator Buchanan/Dave Elton
- St. Edwards
- Staffordville (a separate village until 1913)
- Westminster
- Winston Churchill
- Uplands

=== West Lethbridge ===
The newest of the three areas, West Lethbridge is home to the University of Lethbridge. The bulk of the city's growth since the early 1990s has been on the west side. It also has the youngest population of the three.

- Benton Crossing
- Copperwood
- Heritage Heights
- Garry Station
- Indian Battle Heights
- Mountain Heights
- Paradise Canyon
- Ridgewood Heights
- Riverstone
- Sunridge
- Varsity Village
- West Highlands

=== South Lethbridge ===
South Lethbridge is the commercial heart of the city, and has the oldest population of the three areas. It contains the downtown core, as well as the bulk of retail and hospitality establishments. Lethbridge College and the city's main arena, the ENMAX Centre are also located here.

- Chinook Heights
- Fairmont Park
- Fleetwood/St. Patrick's
- Glendale
- Hamilton
- Henderson Lake
- Lakeview
- London Road
- Redwood
- Scenic Heights
- Southgate
- Tudor Estates
- Victoria Park
