= London Road (disambiguation) =

London Road is a popular road name in the United Kingdom.

London Road may also refer to:

== Arts and entertainment ==
- London Road (album), a 2015 album by Modestep
- London Road (musical), a 2011 musical by Alecky Blythe and Adam Corke
  - London Road (film), a 2015 film adaptation of the musical

== Cricket grounds ==
- London Road, High Wycombe
- London Road, Shrewsbury
- London Road, Sleaford

== Other uses ==
- London Road, Lethbridge, a neighbourhood in Lethbridge, Alberta, Canada
- London Road railway station (disambiguation), the name of several stations
- London Road Stadium, in Peterborough, England

== See also ==
- "London Roads", a song by Lil Wayne from the 2015 Free Weezy Album
