= Lethbridge station (Canadian Pacific) =

Railway station in Lethbridge, Alberta, Canada

Lethbridge
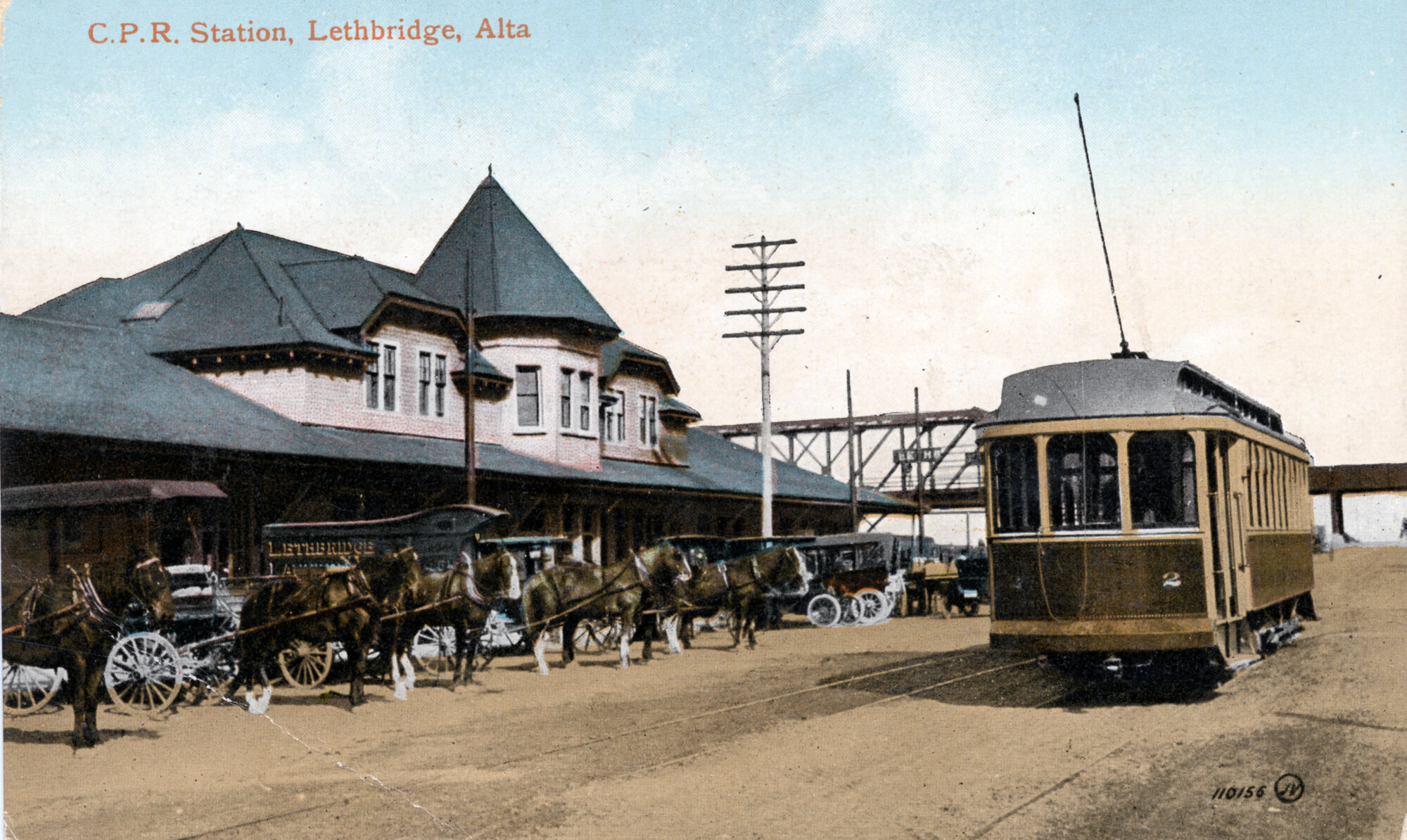
- Postcard showing the station, circa 1912

General information
- Location: 801 1 Avenue South, Lethbridge, Alberta, Canada
- Coordinates: 49.698°N 112.835°W
- Line: Canadian Pacific Railway

History
- Opened: 1906; 120 years ago
- Closed: 1971 (passenger); 1984 (freight)
- Rebuilt: 1908 and 1911

Former services
Preceding station	Canadian Pacific Railway	Following station
Coalhurst toward Katz	Katz – Medicine Hat via Nelson and Lethbridge	Coaldale toward Medicine Hat
Terminus	Lethbridge – Coutts	Wilson toward Coutts
Terminus	Lethbridge – Turin	Coalhurst toward Turin
Location

Lethbridge station (also known as Union Station) is a former railway station in Lethbridge, Alberta, Canada. It was built by the Canadian Pacific Railway in 1905-1906 and expanded in 1908 and 1911.

The station was in use until 1971, when the last service, a CP Rail Dayliner train to Calgary, was discontinued. In 1984, the railyards were relocated to nearby Kipp, and the station building was sold to Alberta Health Services and converted for use as a Community Health Unit.

CPR locomotive 3651 is on static display at the back of the station.
