= Exhibition Park =

Exhibition Park may refer to:

- Exhibition Park (Lethbridge)
- Exhibition Park, Newcastle
- Exhibition Park in Canberra, Australia
- Exhibition Place in Toronto, Canada
