= 2023 census =

2023 census may refer to:

- 2023 Alberta municipal censuses
- 2023 New Zealand census
- 2023 Pakistani census
