= Melcor Centre =

- Location: Lethbridge, Alberta, Canada
- Coordinates: 49.6933°N 112.8425°W
- Address: 400 4 Av S
- Opened: 1975
- Previous names: Lethbridge Centre
- Developer: Poole Construction
- Manager: Grace Duff
- Owner: Melcor Developments Ltd.
- Num. of anchor tenants: 2 (major)
- Floor area: 446,272 sq ft (41,460.0 m^{2})
- Floors: 2 (mall); 11 (office tower)
- Website: www.melcor.ca/retail/alberta/lethbridge/melcor-centre

Melcor Centre (originally the Lethbridge Centre) is a professional centre in Downtown Lethbridge, in Alberta, Canada. Originally built as a retail mall, the centre consists of a two-storey complex that now houses primarily professional offices and a conference facility. Its anchor tenant is the city's branch of TD Canada Trust. It transitioned from a retail mall to a professional service centre over an 11-year period. Its current owner, Melcor Developments Ltd., purchased the property in 2007 and renamed it to Melcor Centre in 2018.

The main retail level and office tower were built in 1975 by Poole Construction at a cost of $22 million, and the second retail level was built in 1988. A two-screen Famous Players movie theatre opened at Lethbridge Centre in 1979 and was closed in 2005, around the time of Cineplex Entertainment's acquisition of Famous Players. The 11-storey office tower is the 4th tallest building in Lethbridge and the tallest office tower. A Hudson's Bay location was at the mall, in a space previously occupied by Woodward's from 1993 until 2025.

== See also ==
- List of shopping malls in Canada
