= Ernest Sterndale Bennett =

Ernest Gaskell Sterndale Bennett CM (30 May 1884 – 8 April 1982) was an actor and theatre director in Canada.

Born in London and a grandson of the English composer Sir William Sterndale Bennett, he was educated at Derby School and in 1904 qualified with first class honours as a civil and mechanical engineer from the Central Technical College of the City & Guilds of London Institute. In 1905, he emigrated to Canada and began working in amateur theatres in Moose Jaw, Medicine Hat and Lethbridge.

In 1923, he founded and directed the Lethbridge Playgoers Club and later the Alberta Drama Festival upon which the Governor General the Earl of Bessborough later based the Dominion Drama Festival.

Abandoning his career as an engineer in favor of the theatre, he moved to Toronto in 1933 to become a professional actor, director, teacher, adjudicator and consultant. He was a director of the T. Eaton Dramatic Club, later renamed The Toronto Masquers Club. Several of his students won major awards.

During the Second World War he served as a munitions inspector for the British Admiralty Technical Mission. In 1945, he returned to Toronto to create the drama department of the Royal Conservatory of Music.

Bennett was married first to Sarah O'Donnell in 1905 who died the following year, then five years later to Belle Seater who died in 1936 and finally to Hilda Church with whom he established the Toronto-based Canadian Theatre School in 1949

In December 1974, he was appointed a Member of the Order of Canada for services to the theatre. He died in Vancouver on 8 April 1982 at age 97.

In his memory, the Sterndale Bennett Theatre in the Genevieve E. Yates Memorial Centre in Lethbridge, Alberta was opened on 21 April 1990. It was renovated and reopened in 2021.

== Sources ==
- Mann, Dr George (2004) Sterndale Bennett – A Man for all Theatre (Lethbridge Historical Society)
- Canadian Broadcasting Corporation. Accessed 20 January
