= Whoop-Up Days =

Annual festival in Lethbridge, Alberta, Canada

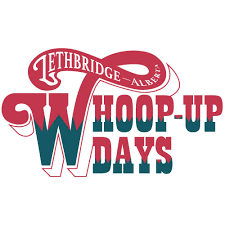
- Genre: Exhibition, rodeo, festival
- Dates: 5 days, starting on the Tuesday of the last full week of August
- Locations: Lethbridge, Alberta, Canada
- Founded: 1897; 129 years ago (Exhibition); 1904; 122 years ago (Rodeo)
- Attendance: 40,178 (2024); 77,263 (record – 2023)
- Organizer: Lethbridge & District Exhibition
- Website: www.agrifoodhub.ca/events/whoop-up

Whoop-Up Days is an annual 5-day exhibition and rodeo held in Lethbridge, Alberta, Canada organized by the Lethbridge & District Exhibition.

Held during the last full week of August, the event includes a parade through downtown, daily concerts, bull riding, a rodeo, an indoor and outdoor trade show, live-music, a midway, and citywide pancake breakfasts and barbecues.

In 2023, a record-breaking attendance at the event numbered 77,263. The previous record was set in 2007 when 69,964 visitors attended. Economic impact from the fair amounts to roughly $2.5 million spent by event operations, locals and visitors.

== History ==
The first fair was held on 5 October 1897 at the agricultural grounds in Queen Victoria Park (renamed in 1955 to Gyro Park). It included stage presentations, travelling shows and horse racing.

In 1904, eight years before the Calgary Stampede, the first large-scale rodeo was staged as part of Whoop-Up Days.

In 1912, the festival was moved to its current location on the Exhibition grounds east of Henderson Park.

There were cancellations in 1917–18 & 1942–45. A virtual event was held in 2020 due to the COVID-19 pandemic.

== Location ==
Whoop-Up Days takes place at Exhibition Park, which is on the eastern edge of the city next to Henderson Park. Permanent structures at the site include a 10,664 m^{2} (114,787 ft^{2}) pavilion complex (main, north, west and south pavilions, and Saddle Room), Heritage Hall, Pioneer Park, a grandstand, and a racetrack.

== Name ==
The name “Whoop-Up Days” is derived from the nearby national historic site Fort Whoop-Up, which was a whisky trading outpost and hub of illicit activities in the mid-19th century before the arrival of the North-West Mounted Police in the area that is now Lethbridge.

== See also ==
- Whoop-Up Trail
- List of festivals in Lethbridge
- List of festivals in Canada § Fairs and exhibitions
