= London railway station =

London railway station may refer to:

== Canada ==
- London station (Ontario)

== United Kingdom ==
- London station group, the 18 railway stations in central London
- List of London railway stations
- List of closed railway stations in London

== See also ==
- London Road railway station (disambiguation)
- London Overground
- Royal Commission on Metropolitan Railway Termini, which evaluated various proposals for a single London railway terminus
- List of London Underground stations
- List of Docklands Light Railway stations
