= Hardieville, Lethbridge =

Hardieville
- Neighbourhood
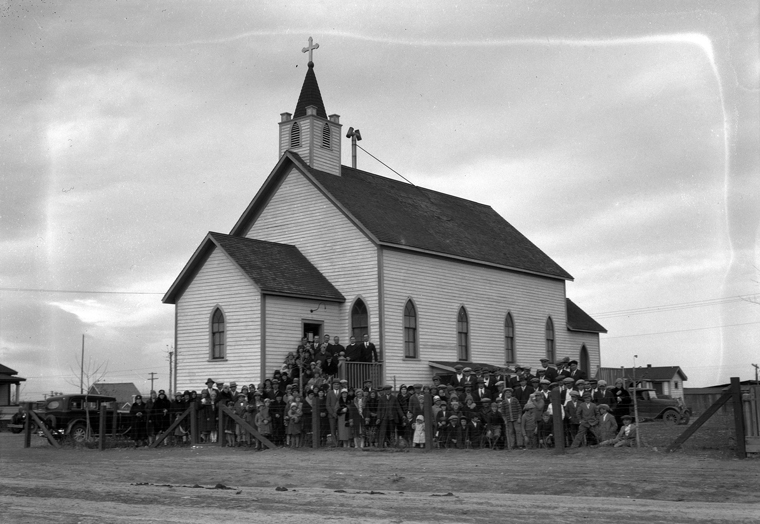
- Parishioners outside Our Lady of Lourdes Roman Catholic Church in 1930
- Interactive map of Hardieville
- Coordinates: 49.74028°N 112.82806°W
- Country: Canada
- Province: Alberta
- City: Lethbridge
- Quadrant: NW
- Established: 1910
- Annexed: 1978

Government
  - Administrative body: Lethbridge City Council

Hardieville is a residential neighbourhood in the northwest quadrant of Lethbridge, Alberta, Canada. It is located north of Scenic Drive North and west of 13 Street North. It borders Legacy Ridge and Uplands to the southeast.

Hardieville was formerly a hamlet northwest of the City of Lethbridge, Alberta. The hamlet was named after William Duncan Livingstone Hardie, the 13th mayor of Lethbridge. The hamlet was annexed by the City of Lethbridge in 1978.

== History ==
The community of Hardieville emerged around the Galt Mine No. 6, which operated between 1908 and 1935. It was a coal mining town and was known for bootlegging during the Prohibition era. The mine site was chosen because of a 1908 flood that impacted mine sites of the west side of the Oldman River. Many of the buildings from the mine site were moved over to the new Galt 8 mine, which was located in what is now West Lethbridge. All that remains of the mine site are a parts of the shaft No. 5, drift tunnel, fan house, engine house, tipple, power house, and boiler house. The community had included company and residential houses, a mine manager’s house, a shared bath house, water towers, a school, a café, a meat market, and two general stores.

By 1910, Hardieville saw 700 men employed by the mine, many of whom lived in Hardieville. Residents were Eastern European, English Scottish, and Italian. Eventually, immigrants from Eastern Canada, United States, Japan, and China moved into the neighbourhood.

The Hamlet of Hardieville was annexed in 1978 by the City of Lethbridge.

== See also ==
- List of neighbourhoods in Lethbridge
