= Lethbridge metropolitan area =

Lethbridge metropolitan area Greater Lethbridge
- Census metropolitan area
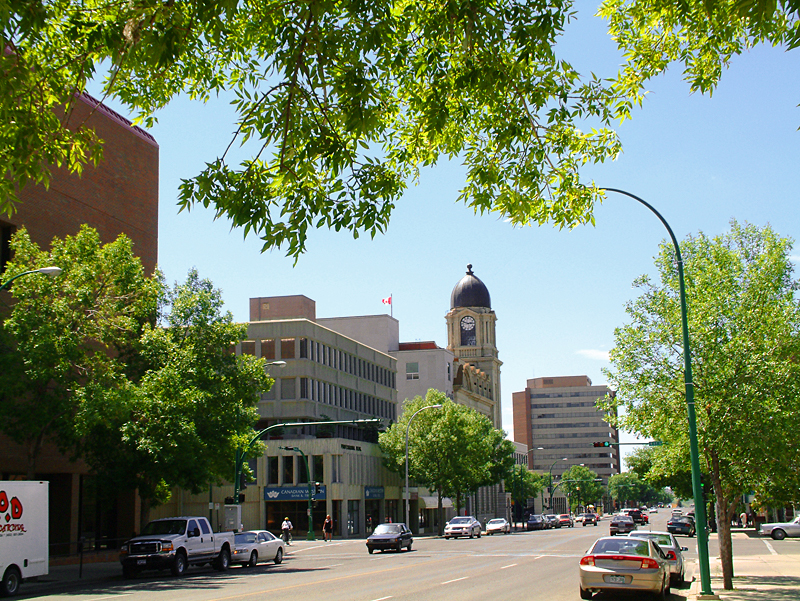
- Downtown Lethbridge
- Interactive map of Lethbridge metropolitan area
- Coordinates: 49°41′37″N 112°50′31″W
- Country: Canada
- Province: Alberta

Area
  - Total: 2,958.96 km^{2} (1,142.46 sq mi)

Population
  - CMA: 123,847
- Time zone: UTC−06:00 (Alberta Time)

The Lethbridge metropolitan area is a census metropolitan area (CMA) in the southern portion of the Canadian province of Alberta that is centred on the City of Lethbridge. At a population of 123,847 in the 2021 Census of Population as conducted by Statistics Canada, the CMA consists of seven municipalities including one city, one municipal district, four towns, and one village.

== Geography ==
Located in southern Alberta, the Lethbridge CMA is bisected by Highway 3, which forms part of the Crowsnest Highway. Municipalities within the CMA include the City of Lethbridge; Lethbridge County; the towns of Coaldale, Coalhurst, Nobleford, and Picture Butte; and the Village of Barons. Waterways in the Lethbridge CMA include the Oldman River, Chin Lakes, Keho Lake, and Stirling Lake.

== Demographics ==
In the 2021 Census of Population conducted by Statistics Canada, the Lethbridge CMA had a population of 123,847 living in 40,225 of its 42,862 total private dwellings, a change of 5.5% from its 2016 population of 117,394. With a land area of 2,958.96 km^{2} (1,142.46 sq mi), it had a population density of 41.9/km^{2} (108.4/sq mi) in 2021.

Municipalities in the Lethbridge CMA
| Name | Status | Incorporation date (current status) | 2021 Census of Population | | | | |
| Name | Status | Incorporation date (current status) | Population (2021) | Population (2016) | Change (%) | Land area (km^{2}) | Population density (/km^{2}) |
|---|---|---|---|---|---|---|---|
| Lethbridge | City | May 9, 1906 | 98,406 | 92,729 | +6.1% | 121.12 | 812.5 |
| Lethbridge County | Municipal district | January 1, 1954 | 10,120 | 10,237 | −1.1% | 2,815.66 | 3.6 |
| Coaldale | Town | January 7, 1952 | 8,771 | 8,331 | +5.3% | 13.58 | 645.9 |
| Coalhurst | Town | June 1, 1995 | 2,869 | 2,668 | +7.5% | 3.08 | 931.5 |
| Nobleford | Town | February 28, 2018 | 1,438 | 1,278 | +12.5% | 1.69 | 850.9 |
| Picture Butte | Town | January 1, 1960 | 1,930 | 1,810 | +6.6% | 3.02 | 639.1 |
| Barons | Village | May 6, 1910 | 313 | 341 | −8.2% | 0.81 | 386.4 |
| Total Lethbridge CMA | | | 123,847 | 117,394 | +5.5% | 2,958.96 | 41.9 |
