= Genevieve E. Yates Memorial Centre =

Two theatres in Alberta

Coordinates: 49°41′38.5″N 112°49′54.75″W

The Genevieve E. Yates Memorial Centre houses two performance theatres in downtown Lethbridge, Alberta. The centre was built starting 15 August 1965 and officially opened 1 May 1966. Deane Yates, a local retailer, donated over $200,000 towards its existence and asked the centre be named Genevieve E. Yates Memorial.

Its two theatres are the 500-seat proscenium Yates Theatre and the 180-seat black box Sterndale Bennett Theatre named after the actor/director Ernest Sterndale Bennett, a grandson of the composer Sir William Sterndale Bennett and who, in December 1974, was appointed a Member of the Order of Canada for services to the theatre. An art gallery exists in the upper mezzanine area, which is operated by the Allied Arts Council of Lethbridge. Since 1990, the building has been home to local theatre society New West Theatre.
