= Chinatown, Lethbridge =

District in Lethbridge, Alberta, Canada

Coordinates: 49.69718°N 112.84280°W

Map of 1912 Chinatown showing stores, laundries and restaurants

Lethbridge's Chinatown is a small district in downtown Lethbridge, Alberta, Canada. At the beginning of the 20th century, the district had a population of around 100 and businesses consisted of six laundries, four grocers and two restaurants. While the bulk of residences and businesses were focused along the 300 block of Ford Street — what is now modern Chinatown — this area was the centre of a much larger nine-block area.

== History ==
Previous to the establishment of what is now Chinatown, the area was known as the Segregated Area. It was a red-light district frequented by prostitution, gambling and bootlegging, fueled mostly by coal miners. In 1911, the City of Lethbridge passed Bylaw 83, which restricted the location of Chinese laundries to the Segregated Area. The bylaw was a result of complaints from non-Chinese laundry owners who felt the Chinese laundries were too close to the town's centre. By the time the bylaw was rescinded in 1916, prejudice and racism had already isolated the Chinese to this area and led to the establishment of Chinatown.

By the 1960s, Chinese residents began moving out of the area, and by the end of the 20th century, all but one resident — Albert Leong, owner of Bow On Tong — had moved out, and Chinatown was reduced to one block with only a handful of buildings.
