= Park Place Mall =

- Coordinates: 49.69882°N 112.84037°W
- Address: 501 1st Avenue South; Lethbridge, Alberta; T1J 4L9
- Opened: 1988
- Manager: Primaris Management Inc.
- Owner: H&R REIT
- Num. of stores: 123
- Num. of anchor tenants: 9
- Floor area: 477,000 sq ft (44,300 m^{2})
- Floors: 1
- Parking: 2,277
- Website: www.parkplacemall.ca

Park Place Mall or Park Place Shopping Centre, is a shopping mall located in Lethbridge, Alberta, Canada.

Built in 1988, the 477,000 sq ft (44,300 m^{2})+ mall covers four city blocks downtown and includes over 120 stores, including three anchor stores, Winners, Shoppers Drug Mart and Galaxy Cinemas. Former anchors include Eaton's and Sears Canada, with the latter closing with the chain's collapse in 2018. While the Eaton's space was redeveloped into other retailers (including Winners), as of early 2019, the former Sears location remains vacant.

The mall's property is leased from the City of Lethbridge until August 2028, with three ten-year options and one five-year option thereafter.

== See also ==
- List of shopping malls in Canada
