= Chinook Regional Hospital =

- Alberta Health Services
- Location in Lethbridge

Geography
- Location: Lethbridge, Alberta, Canada
- Coordinates: 49°41′05″N 112°48′56″W

Organisation
- Type: Teaching
- Affiliated university: University of Calgary Faculty of Medicine

Services
- Emergency department: Yes, Level III trauma center
- Beds: 270

Helipads
- Helipad: TC LID: CLH4

History
- Founded: 1955; 71 years ago

Links
- Website: www.albertahealthservices.ca

Chinook Regional Hospital is the district general hospital for the City of Lethbridge and Southern Alberta, and offers many of the health care services for Alberta Health Services. The hospital services a population of over 150,000 and is supported by the Chinook Regional Hospital Foundation.

== History ==
The first hospital in Lethbridge opened in 1891 by the family of Alexander Galt, a local entrepreneur. The original building now houses the Galt Museum. The Sisters of St. Martha opened the St. Michael's Hospital at 13th Street South and 9th Avenue South in 1929. In 1955, the City of Lethbridge built a municipal hospital nearby where the CRH is located today. Up until 1960, both hospitals received several expansions. The Alberta Department of Health later evaluated them and discovered both needed substantial structural upgrades. The decision was made to rebuild the municipal hospital and redesign St. Michael's as a long-term facility. Despite proposals of several locations for the new hospital, ultimately the hospital was built on the same lot as the municipal hospital allowing the latter to still operate during construction. The Lethbridge Regional Hospital opened June 24, 1988 at the cost of $118 million. The hospital was renamed the Chinook Regional Hospital in 2006. In 2016, a $127 million project saw the Hospital complete an additional five-storey hospital wing to service the growing Lethbridge community.

== Services ==
The Chinook Regional Hospital is a busy health facility, the emergency department alone sees more than 48,700 patient visits annually while ambulatory services has more than 52,500 visits annually.

Some of the health services provided include the following:

- Emergency
- Intensive care
- Geriatrics
- Internists
- Medical subspecialties, including: Cardiology, Dermatology, Endocrinology, Gastroenterology, Hematology, Immunology, Nephrology, Neurology, Rheumatology & Respirology
- Ambulatory services
- Palliative care
- Mental health
- Pediatrics
- Neonatal Intensive Care Unit
- Anesthesiology
- Obstetrics & Gynecology
- General Surgery
- Surgical specialties, including: Orthopedics, Urology, Plastic Surgery, Vascular, Ophthalmology & ENT
- Oncology & Radiation Therapy via the Jack Ady Cancer Centre
- Level II trauma centre
- Nuclear Medicine
- Diagnostic & Interventional Radiology
- Laboratory & Pathology testing
- Specialised clinics, including: Cardiac Rehabilitation, Asthma Clinics, COPD Program, Heart Function Clinic, Diabetic Education
- Specialised allied health services, including: Therapeutic exercise & Physiotherapy, Nutrition & Dietectics

It is a 270+ bed hospital administered by Alberta Health Services. The facility has over 250 acute care beds, 20 ICU beds, 45 acute geriatrics beds and more than 15 NICU bassinets.

== Heliport ==
The hospital is equipped with a helipad for transporting patients to Calgary. Its elevation is 2,993 ft (912 m) and its main user is the Shock Trauma Air Rescue Society (STARS) air ambulance service.

== Affiliations ==
The Chinook Regional Hospital is a teaching hospital and has affiliations with the Cumming School of Medicine at the University of Calgary, the University of Lethbridge, the Lethbridge College, the Southern Alberta Institute of Technology and the Canadian Centre for Behavioural Neuroscience. LPN, PCA, Unit Clerks, Radiology Technicians, Sonographers and Bachelor of Nursing students regularly rotate through the Chinook Health Region.

== The Guest House ==
The Guest House at Alberta Rose Lodge provides short-term accommodations for adult patients seeking outpatient treatment at the Chinook Regional Hospital and Jack Ady Cancer Centre. It is also available to individuals from outside Lethbridge with family receiving inpatient care.

== Philanthropy ==
Philanthropic funding is directed by the Chinook Regional Hospital Foundation. Funds are used to fund healthcare equipment, programs, patient care and special projects.
