= Downtown Lethbridge =

Coordinates: 49.695°N 112.839°W

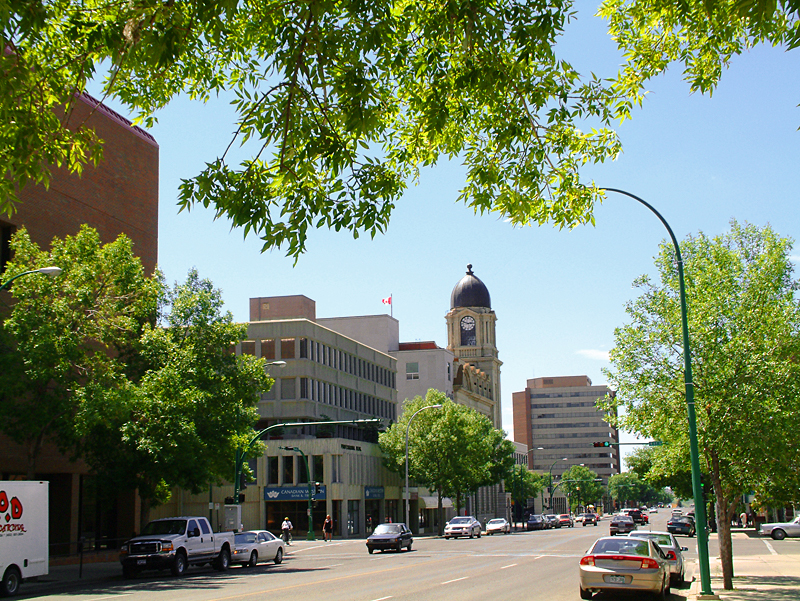
4 Avenue South facing west

Downtown Lethbridge is the central business district of Lethbridge, Alberta, Canada, hosting most of the city's banks and several accounting and law practices, including national firms.

== Boundaries ==
Location of downtown marked in red

Strictly speaking, the downtown is defined by the Oldman River valley on the west, Crowsnest Trail and the CPR rail line on the north, Stafford Drive (9 Street) on the east and 6 Avenue on the south. It is not very large and contains very little in neighbourhood structure. It is home to Chinatown, a two block area on 2 Avenue, west of Galt Gardens.

== Transportation ==
Downtown Lethbridge serves as a transportation hub. Whoop-Up Drive, the busiest roadway in Lethbridge, connects to downtown. Scenic Drive also provides downtown with a connection to the United States via Highway 4 and the Lethbridge County Airport via Highway 5. Downtown has two connections to Highway 3, which provides direct access to British Columbia and indirect access to Calgary and Saskatchewan. The city's main transit terminal is downtown; half of the city's bus routes converge on 4 Avenue.

== Arts and culture ==
Arts and culture venues in Lethbridge are located in or near downtown. There are two art galleries (Southern Alberta Art Gallery and Bowman Arts Centre), two theatres (Yates Theatre and Sterndale Bennet Theatre), the Galt Museum, two cinemas, the Lethbridge Public Library and several nightclubs.

== Shopping ==
The downtown area has several hundred street-front retail stores interspersed with professional services. Two of the city's largest malls (Lethbridge Centre and Park Place Mall) are located downtown.

== Housing ==
Much of the land use in the downtown area is commercial or public use. Residential use is generally of three different types: high density apartments (over a dozen stories), medium-density apartments (two-storey buildings and units above retail establishments) and condominiums for seniors. There are three senior care facilities in or near downtown.

== See also ==
- List of neighbourhoods in Lethbridge
