= London Road railway station =

London Road railway station, or simply London Road station, may refer to:

- Bicester London Road railway station, since renamed to Bicester Village
- Braunston London Road railway station, a former railway station in Northamptonshire
- London Road (Brighton) railway station, a railway station in Sussex
- Carlisle London Road railway station, a disused railway station in Cumbria
- London Road (Guildford) railway station, a railway station in Surrey
- Leicester London Road railway station, since renamed to Leicester railway station
- Manchester London Road railway station, since renamed to Manchester Piccadilly railway station
- Nottingham London Road railway station, a former railway station in Nottinghamshire
- St Albans (London Road) railway station, a former railway station in Hertfordshire
- London Road (Cairnryan Military Railway) railway station, a former station on the Cairnryan Military Railway
- Wellingborough London Road railway station, a former railway station in Northamptonshire

== See also ==
- London railway station (disambiguation)
