= Galt Museum & Archives =

Galt Museum & Archives Akaisamitohkanao’pa
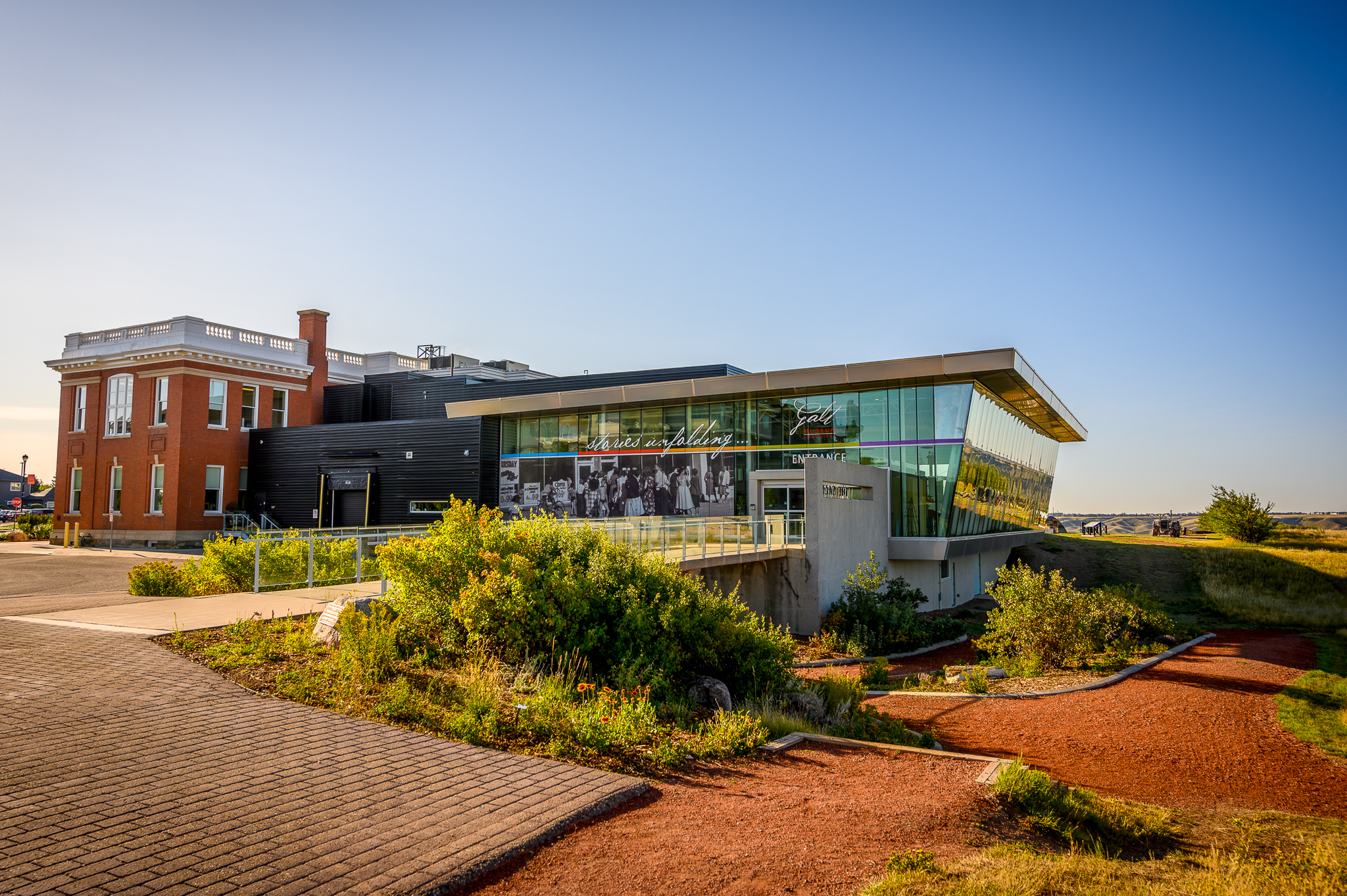
- Exterior of the Galt Museum & Archives shortly after sunrise.

- Location in Lethbridge
- Established: 1964; 62 years ago
- Location: 502 1st Street South; Lethbridge, Alberta, Canada
- Coordinates: 49°41′32.6″N 112°50′49.9″W
- Type: History museum
- Accreditation: Alberta Museums Association
- Visitors: 50,000
- Director: Darrin J Martens
- Curator: Tyler Stewart
- Public transit access: 5 Ave & Scenic Drive S
- Website: www.galtmuseum.com

The Galt Museum & Archives Akaisamitohkanao’pa is the primary museum in Lethbridge, Alberta, Canada, and is the largest museum in the province south of Calgary. In 2006, the museum cared for a growing collection of over 20,000 artifacts and 300,000 archival documents and photographs record the history of Lethbridge and southern Alberta. It attracts over 50,000 visitors every year.

== History ==
A Scientific and Historical Society was formed in Lethbridge in October 1888. Little was done for record archives, and emphasis for the society laid with the presentation of papers at bi-weekly meetings.

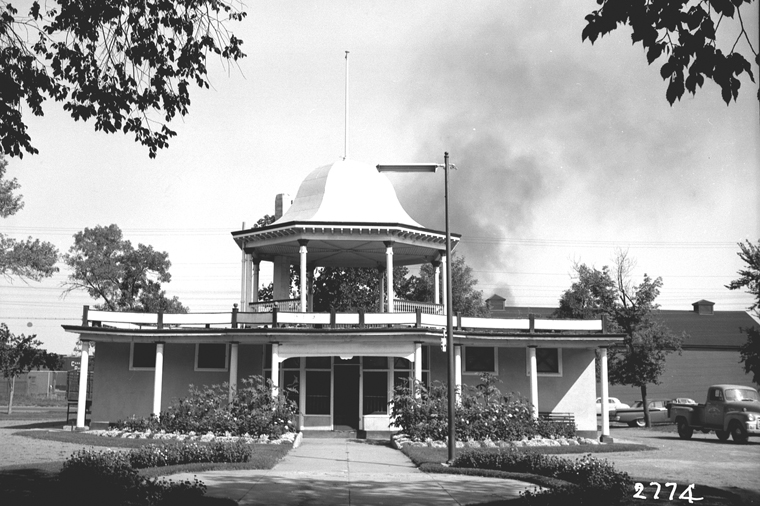
The Gurney Museum operated out of the old Board of Trade building in Galt Gardens from 1944 until 1961, when the building was demolished.

In 1944, Walter Gurney opened a private museum—the first museum in the city. The building that housed Gurney's Museum was originally built as a bandstand, no more than a platform with a railing. By 1909 several improvements had been made, and the bandstand was transformed into a two-storey structure with a bandstand on the upper level, and a glass-fronted room at ground level. The bandstand was reached by a set of stairs on the outside of the building. The ground floor housed the Board of Trade, and became known as the Board of Trade Building. The building was originally about 30 metres inside the west boundary of Galt Gardens, opposite 118 5 Street South. In 1911 the building was moved to a location halfway along the north boundary of the park. In June 1912 two wings were added.

In February 1922 the Board of Trade Building suffered a fire but was repaired. The Board of Trade continued to operate out of the building until 1944 when they moved operations to the Marquis Hotel. Walter Gurney and his wife then applied to lease the building to house their museum, and it became Gurney's Museum until 1961. On 28 August 1961 the building was demolished. When the museum closed many of its artifacts moved to the private Altamont Museum in the nearby town of Coutts, Alberta.

The first civic museum opened in 1964 with George McKillop as curator. It was located in three rooms in the former Bowman Elementary School (now Bowman Arts Centre). The museum quickly outgrew its space and within three years had moved into the considerably renovated former Galt Hospital. The Sir Alexander Galt Museum and Archives (named for Alexander Tilloch Galt) was operated until 1971 by the Lethbridge and District Historical Society.

=== Expansion ===
In the early 1980s, the museum was placed in the Urban Parks Program and the museum expanded to include additional gallery space and expanded storage space. The new space allowed for the development of new programs and temporary exhibits.

In September 2004, the museum moved its offices and collections off-site to facilitate a $8.9 million expansion. Government funding for the project included $3.13 million from the City of Lethbridge, $1.9 million from the Government of Canada, and $1.45 million from the Province of Alberta. The museum reopened on 6 May 2006, and was renamed the Galt Museum & Archives. This renovation included: Discovery Hall, a 5,000-square-foot (460 m^{2}) exhibit centre with the permanent exhibit "Exploring Southwestern Alberta" and frequently changing temporary exhibits; a larger store; and the 2,500-square-foot (230 m^{2}) Galt Education Centre.

=== Blackfoot name ===
In 2022, the museum received the Blackfoot name Akaisamitohkanao’pa, meaning 'eternal gathering place', from local Niitsitapi (Blackfoot) Elders Bruce Wolf Child and Mary Fox. The naming represents a step on an important journey of working collaboratively with the Niitsitapi community and walking the path of reconciliation together.

== Awards ==
In 2003, the museum was awarded the Museums Alberta Award of Excellence for Exhibitions for its "Ancestors" exhibit. The exhibit was a result of a partnership with the Royal Ontario Museum and the British Museum in London, England.

The Galt has since been awarded with recognitions for excellence in programming, curation, marketing and tourism initiatives, horticulture and archival and collections management, including the following:

- Award of Merit for "History on Tap" program, Alberta Museums Association, 1991
- Programming–Exhibits Award for Akaitapiiwa–Ancestors Exhibit, Alberta Museums Association, 2003
- Marketing Excellence Award Finalist for Year of the Coalminer, Alberta Tourism Marketing Awards, 2004
- Marketing Partnership Award Finalist for Year of the Coalminer, Alberta Tourism Marketing Awards, 2004
- Tourism Partnership Initiative Award for Year of the Coalminer, Chinook Country Tourist Association, 2004
- Museums and Society Award for Year of the Coalminer, Alberta Museums Association, 2005
- Change and Innovation Award, Lethbridge Chamber of Commerce, 2007
- Collections Award in Collections Management for Operation Homecoming, Alberta Museums Association, 2007
- Programming Award in the Exhibits Category for Auschwitz: The Eva Brewster Story, Alberta Museums Association, 2007
- Marketing Excellence Award for Auschwitz: The Eva Brewster Story, Chinook Country Tourist Association, 2007
- Community Organization Award, The Aboriginal Council of Lethbridge and the Lethbridge Aboriginal Awareness Week Planning Committee, 2011
- 5 Blooms for the Native Prairie Plants Garden at Galt Museum, Communities in Bloom, 2012
- Leadership Award for Engagement, Alberta Museums Association, 2013
- Award for Excellence in Museums Finalist, Governor General's History Awards, 2016
