= Lethbridge Transit =

Public transportation system in Alberta, Canada

- Founded: 1912; 114 years ago
- Headquarters: 619 4 Avenue North
- Locale: Lethbridge, Alberta
- Service type: Public transit
- Routes: 13
- Fleet: 42
- Daily ridership: 3,000 per day
- Fuel type: Diesel, Diesel Hybrid
- Annual budget: $3.5-4 million
- Employees: ~200
- Website: City Transit Dept.

Lethbridge Transit manages and operates the municipally owned public transportation system in Lethbridge, Alberta, Canada.

== History ==
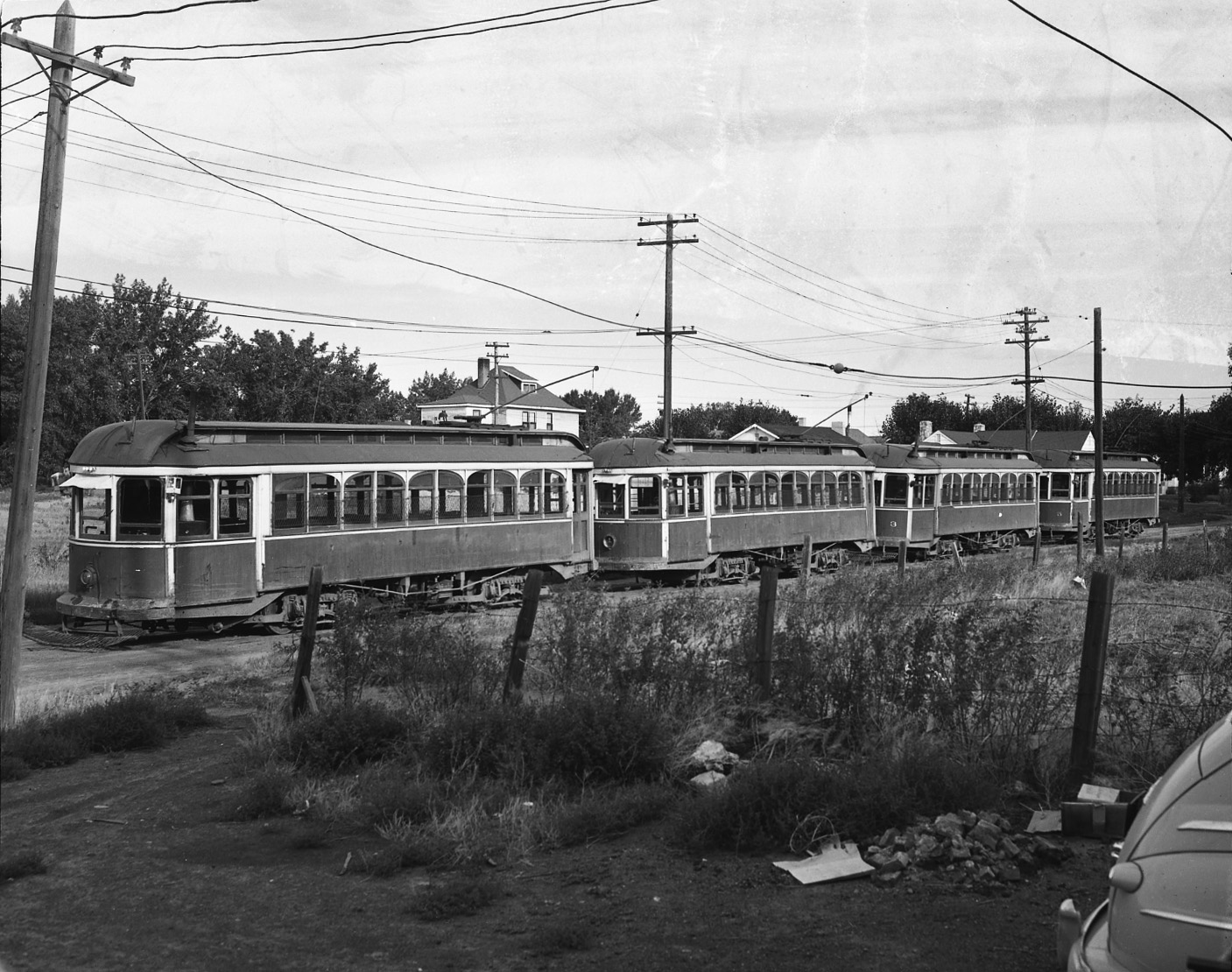
Streetcars in a storage yard after the closure of the street railway system on 8 September 1947.

Public transit in Lethbridge began in 1912 and consisted of a streetcar system operated by the Lethbridge Municipal Railway. The system consisted of three lines, all originating at the southwest corner of what is now Galt Gardens. One line ran to north Lethbridge, one to the exhibition grounds via 6 Avenue, and the third to St. Michael's Hospital via 13 Street. Each car was operated by two men until 1917, when the number was reduced to a single operator on each. At the height of its operations, the streetcar system ran 10 cars over a total of 10 miles of track.

Given the cost of laying new tracks to accommodate city growth, the city began introducing motor buses in 1941. By 1947, the streetcar system had been abandoned, with the North Lethbridge line being the last to operate.

== Operations ==
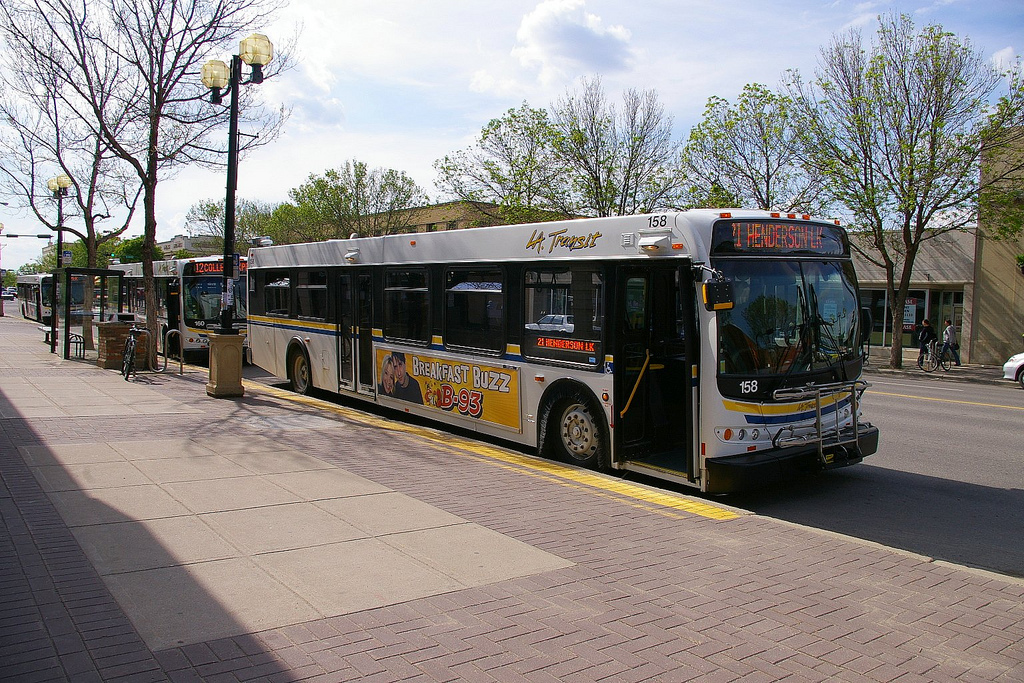
The downtown Lethbridge transit terminal allows the buses to stop curbside to transfer passengers between routes

The public transportation system Lethbridge Transit consists of 42 buses (with an average age of 8 years) — including 8 Euro-styled New Flyers put in operation in August 2006 — that cover most of the city on 13 routes. Traditionally, all bus routes in the city started and ended downtown. In the early 21st century, however, cross-town and shuttle routes were introduced. All routes use wheelchair-accessible buses.

In 2005, Lethbridge Transit had an annual ridership of 2,555,695 on over 25 buses. Expenses for the same year amounted to $6,023,794 with revenues at $2,243,222.

== Recent projects ==
Former logo.

In 2006, Lethbridge Transit explored the possibility of a universal bus pass system for post-secondary students in Lethbridge. While University of Lethbridge undergraduate students voted against the system, graduate students voted in favour. Lethbridge Transit and the Graduate Students Association negotiated a U-Pass system for master's and PhD students effective September 2008. A separate U-Pass system for undergraduate students was launched in 2018.

In June 2011, Lethbridge city council authorized the introduction of an electronic fare card to replace the previous fare system.

In August 2021, Lethbridge implemented a revamp of routes and operations, called cityLINK. The revamp would allow citizens to request a bus on demand in areas with no service. The city has estimated that CityLink will be able to save $350,000 annually. The revamp increased on-time performance and increased daily ridership by 30%.

== Routes ==
Number	Name	Service Between	Service Days
1	cityLINK Gold	West Highlands > Sherring	7 days
2	cityLINK Blue	Sunridge > Southgate	7 days
3	cityLINK Green	Southgate > Sherring	7 days
4	cityLINK Orange	ATB Centre > WT Hill	7 days
51	Red Crow	University > West Highlands	Mon-Sat
52	Columbia	University > Sunridge	Mon-Sat
53	McGill	University > ATB Centre	Mon-Sat
60A	Stafford Dr	City Centre > Uplands > Sherring	Mon-Fri
60B	Stafford Dr	City Centre > Winston Churchill > Sherring	Mon-Fri
60C	Stafford Dr	City Centre > Winston Churchill > Sherring	7 days
61A	5 Ave N	City Centre > 28 St N > Sherring	Mon-Fri
61B	5 Ave N	City Centre > Industrial > Sherring	Mon-Fri
62	13 St S	City Centre > College	Mon-Fri

== See also ==
- Public transport in Canada
