= 2023 Alberta municipal censuses =

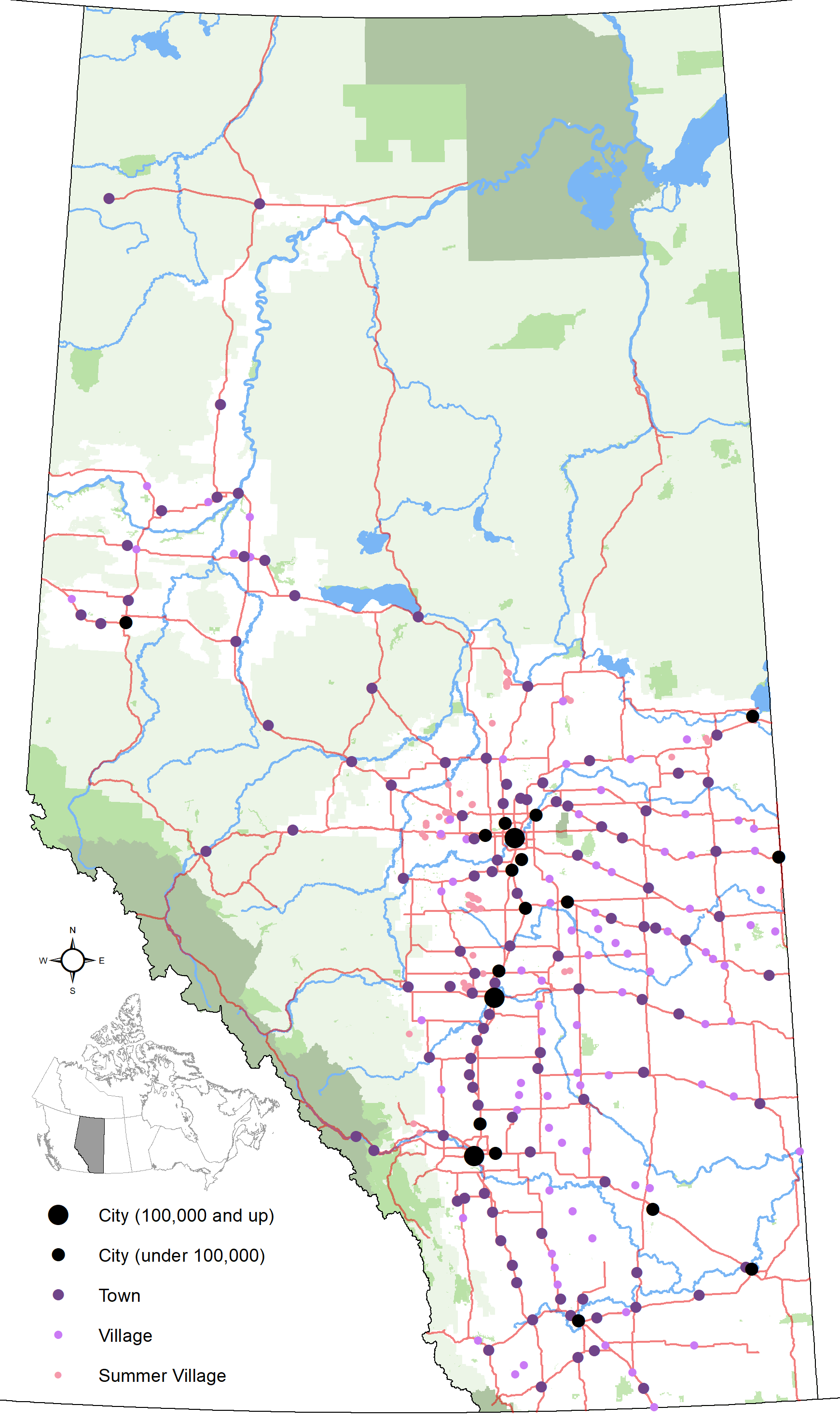
- Distribution of Alberta's 260 urban municipalities

Provincial legislation in Alberta allows municipalities to conduct municipal censuses. Municipalities choose to conduct their own censuses for multiple reasons such as to better inform municipal service planning and provision or to simply update their populations since the last federal census.

Alberta began the year of 2023 with 342 municipalities due to the amalgamation of the towns of Black Diamond and Turner Valley to form Diamond Valley. Seven municipalities conducted a municipal census in 2023: Municipal District (MD) of Willow Creek No. 26 and the cities of Airdrie, Fort Saskatchewan, Lacombe, Leduc, Lethbridge, and Spruce Grove.

Among the various results, Airdrie's municipal census verified that its population surpassed 80,000.

== Municipal census results ==
The following summarizes the results of the seven municipal censuses conducted in 2023.

2023 municipal census summary				2021 federal census comparison				Previous municipal census comparison			
Municipality	Status	Census date	2023 pop.	2021 pop.	Absolute growth	Absolute change	Annual growth rate	Prev. pop.	Prev. census year	Absolute growth	Annual growth rate
Airdrie	City	April 1, 2023	80,649	74,100	6,549	8.8%	4.3%	70,564	2019	10,085	3.4%
Fort Saskatchewan	City	April 1, 2023	28,624	27,088	1,536	5.7%	2.8%	26,942	2019	1,682	1.5%
Lacombe	City	April 4, 2023	14,258	13,396	862	6.4%	3.2%	13,985	2019	273	0.5%
Leduc	City	April 3, 2023	36,060	34,094	1,966	5.8%	2.8%	33,032	2019	3,028	2.2%
Lethbridge	City	April 1, 2023	106,550	98,406	8,144	8.3%	4.1%	101,482	2019	5,068	1.2%
Spruce Grove	City	April 17, 2023	38,985	37,645	1,340	3.6%	1.8%	35,766	2018	3,219	1.7%
MD of Willow Creek No. 26	Municipal district	unpublished	6,182	6,081	101	1.7%	0.8%	5,091	1997	1,091	0.7%

== See also ==
- List of communities in Alberta
