= Wilson Station =

Wilson Station may refer to any of the following:

- Wilson station (North Carolina), an Amtrak station in Wilson, North Carolina
- Wilson station (CTA), a rapid transit station on the Chicago "L" system
- Wilson station (Toronto), a subway station in Toronto, Canada
- D.B. Wilson Generating Station, a power plant in Kentucky

== See also ==
- Plac Wilsona metro station (Wilson Square), a rapid transit station on the Warsaw Metro system
- Praha hlavní nádraží (Prague main railway station), formerly known as Wilson Station (Wilsonovo nádraží)
- Wilson Avenue (BMT Canarsie Line), a rapid transit station on the New York City Subway system
