= Galt Gardens =

Urban park at Lethbridge, Alberta

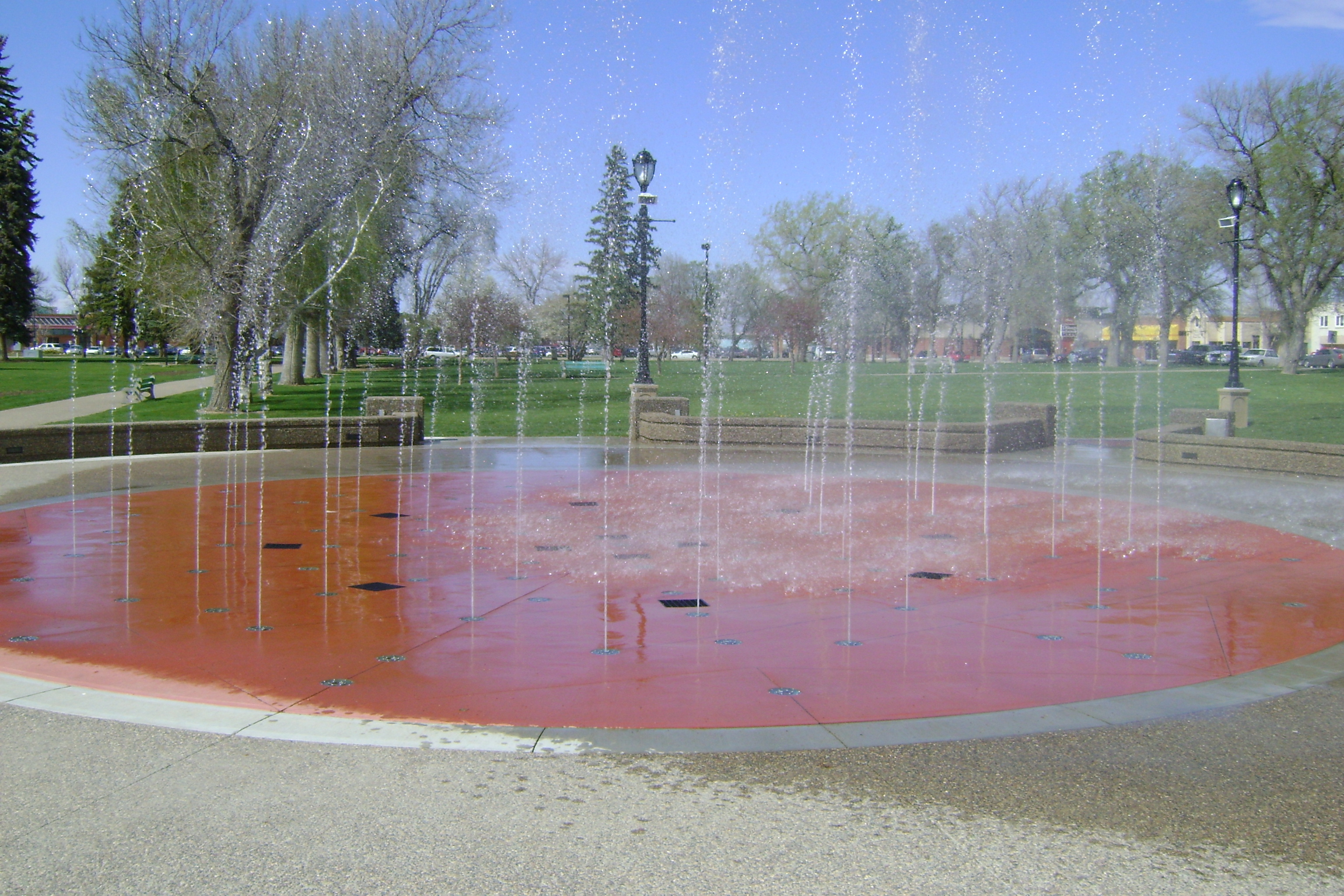
- Rotary Centennial Fountain, at the southeast end of the park
- Interactive map of Galt Gardens
- Type: Public park
- Location: Lethbridge, Alberta, Canada
- Coordinates: 49.69694°N 112.83914°W
- Area: 9.16 acres (3.71 ha)
- Established: 1909; 117 years ago
- Etymology: Named after Galt family
- Owner: City of Lethbridge

Galt Gardens is a 9.16-acre (37,100 m^{2}) urban park located in downtown Lethbridge, Alberta. It is the location of many of the city's festivals and is also the home of the Southern Alberta Art Gallery.

== History ==
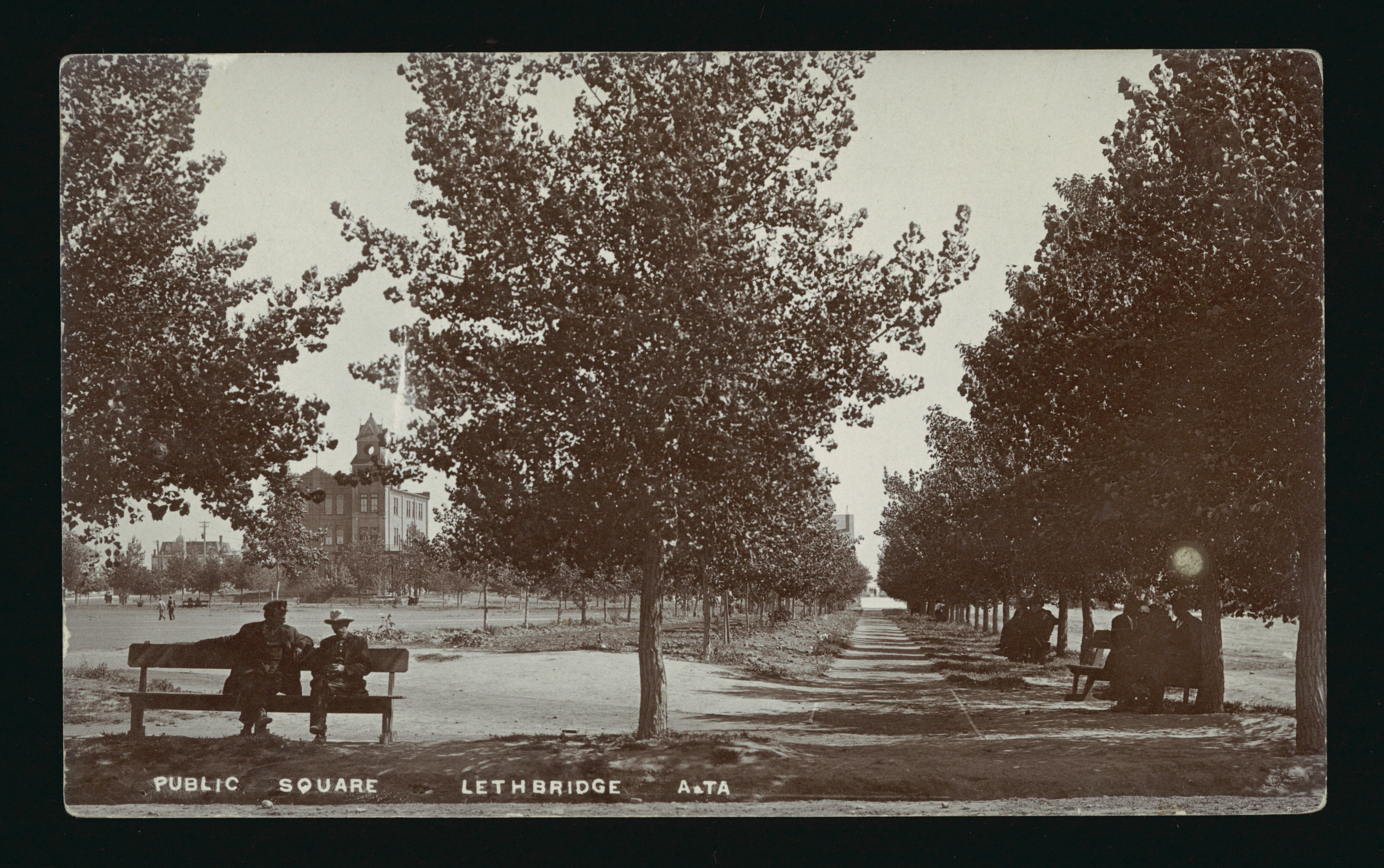
People resting on park benches in a public area then known as "The Square" between 1907 and 1913

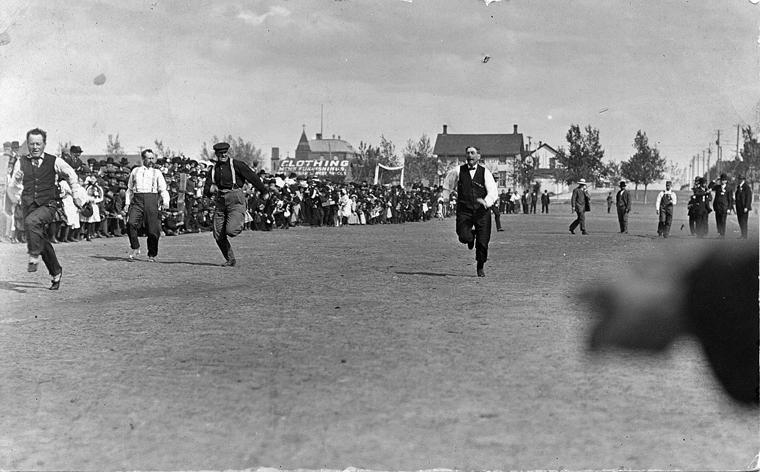
A race conducted at Galt Gardens in 1906

The land that eventually became Galt Gardens was owned by the Galt family, local entrepreneurs. When the original town plan was surveyed in 1885, Elliot Galt ensured the area was reserved as parkland. As the central business district of Lethbridge sprung up around the land, which had come to be known as The Square, the citizens began using it as their own, and it served as the location for most town fairs and sports events.

In 1909, Elliot and John Galt donated the land to the city to be held in perpetuity as parkland. The park was named Galt Gardens in their honour and it was the cultural focal point of the city for many years.

Although trees had been planted around the edge of the park as early as 1901, significant plans were created to further develop the park. The Lethbridge fire department took responsibility for much of the landscaping, and by the 1920s the garden resembled what it is today.

Following World War II and until the 1970s, the park saw a substantial increase in panhandlers. The panhandling and related activities drove people away from the park, and eventually citizens brought the issues to the attention of Lethbridge City Council, which subsequently tightened some bylaws.

In 1991, plans were developed for revitalization of the park, but no further work took place until 2003, when the Lethbridge Rotary Club approached the city with a $3.7 million master plan to revitalize the park for a Rotary 2005 Centennial Project. The city, province and local businesses promised funds for the development.
