= Lethbridge & District Exhibition =

- Exhibition facility
- Area: 61-acre (25 ha)
- Owner: City of Lethbridge
- Manager: Board of Governors of Lethbridge & District Exhibition
- Location: Lethbridge, Alberta, Canada
- Location of Exhibition Grounds in Lethbridge
- Coordinates: 49°41′13″N 112°47′6″W
- Website: https://www.excitelethbridge.ca/

The Lethbridge & District Exhibition (LDE) is a not-for-profit corporation that operates the exhibition complex and fair grounds in Lethbridge, Alberta, Canada. It was established in 1897 as the Lethbridge & District Agricultural Society.

== History ==
The Lethbridge & District Exhibition was first organized by a group of farmers, ranchers, and citizens to promote agriculture and commerce in the area.

In 1912, the City of Lethbridge hosted the World Dry Farming Congress at the exhibition grounds, which were expanded significantly for that event, and included a streetcar line from the CPR station.

In March 2021, construction began on the Exhibition Grounds for a new exhibition hall. The project cost $70.5 Million and was jointly funded by the Government of Alberta’s recovery program, City of Lethbridge, and the Government of Canada. The new Agri-food Hub and Trade Centre opened to the public on August 8, 2023.

Following the completion of the Agri-food Hub and Trade Centre, it was revealed that there had been significant financial mismanagement of the new building project, including non-compliant expenses and contracting works, resulting in a budget deficit of $6.4 Million per year. Subsequently, the City of Lethbridge removed the CEO and Board of Governors and assumed responsibility operating the exhibition.

== Facilities ==
Permanent structures at the site include a 10,664 m^{2} (114,787 ft^{2}) pavilion complex (main, north, west and south pavilions, and Saddle Room), Heritage Hall and a grandstand.

Opened in 2023, the Agri-Food Hub and Trade Centre added an additional 24,898m^{2} (268,000 ft^{2}) of multipurpose space on the exhibition grounds.

== Events ==
Roughly 950 events are held at the park every year, which attract over 850,000 visitors and provide $81 million in economic benefit to the city. By far, the largest event held at the park is Whoop-Up Days, an annual summer fair. Other annual events include Ag Expo, the Home & Garden Show, a weekly Farmers' Market, Country Christmas Craft Show, and Family Fest.

== Governance ==
Exhibition Park is governed by a board of directors consisting of members of the community, including a president, two vice presidents, a past president, and a member each from the City of Lethbridge council and the County of Lethbridge council. The 2006 board of directors consisted of 14 persons.

In the 2005 budget, Exhibition Park had annual revenue of roughly $2.3 million and annual expenditures of about $2.1 million.
