= Lethbridge =

City in Alberta, Canada

- City
- City of Lethbridge
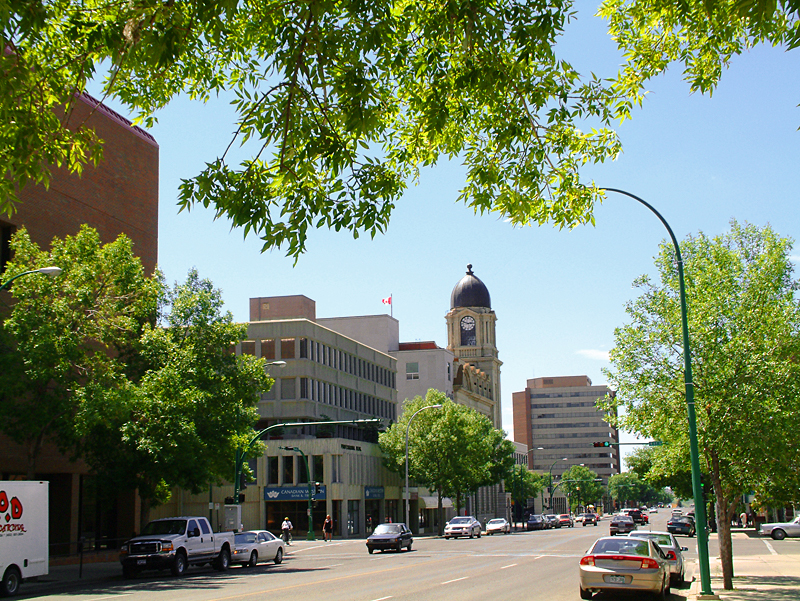
- Downtown Lethbridge on 4th Avenue South in July, 2003

- Flag Coat of arms Logo
- Nicknames: "Bridge City", "The Windy City"
- Motto: Ad occasionis januam "Gateway to Opportunity"
- City boundaries

- Location in Alberta Location in Canada Location in Lethbridge County
- Coordinates: 49°41′37″N 112°50′31″W
- Country: Canada
- Province: Alberta
- Planning region: South Saskatchewan
- Municipal district: Lethbridge County
- Settled: 1874
- Incorporated
  - Town: November 29, 1890
  - City: May 9, 1906
- Named for: William Lethbridge

Government
  - Mayor: Blaine Hyggen (Past mayors)
  - Governing body: Lethbridge City Council: Al Beeber; Mark Campbell; Belinda Crowson; Rajko Dodic; Rufa Doria; Ryan Parker; Jenn Schmidt-Rempel; Ryan Wolfe
  - MP: Rachael Thomas (CPC)
  - MLAs: Nathan Neudorf (UCP); Rob Miyashiro (NDP)
  - City Manager: Lloyd Brierley

Area (2021)
  - Land: 121.12 km^{2} (46.76 sq mi)
  - Urban: 64.00 km^{2} (24.71 sq mi)
  - Metro: 2,958.96 km^{2} (1,142.46 sq mi)
- Elevation: 910 m (2,990 ft)

Population (2021)
  - City: 98,406
  - Density: 812.5/km^{2} (2,104/sq mi)
  - Urban: 92,563
  - Metro: 123,847
  - Metro density: 41.9/km^{2} (109/sq mi)
  - Municipal census (2023): 106,550
- 1446.2
- Demonym: Lethbridgian or Lethbian
- Time zone: UTC−06:00 (Alberta Time)
- Forward sortation areas: T1H–T1K
- Area codes: 403 587, 825, 368
- Highways: Highway 3 Highway 4 Highway 5 Highway 25
- Waterways: Oldman River
- GDP (Lethbridge CMA): CA$6.1 billion (2016)
- GDP per capita (Lethbridge CMA): CA$52,243 (2016)
- Website: www.lethbridge.ca

Lethbridge (/ˈlɛθbrɪdʒ/ LETH-brij) is a city in the province of Alberta, Canada. With a population of 106,550 in the 2023 municipal census, Lethbridge became the fourth Alberta city to surpass 100,000 people. The nearby Canadian Rocky Mountains contribute to the city's warm summers, mild winters, and windy climate. Lethbridge lies approximately 215 km (134 mi) southeast of Calgary on the Oldman River, 169 km (105 mi) west of Medicine Hat, and 105 km (65 mi) northwest of the Canada–United States border at the Sweetgrass–Coutts Border Crossing.

Lethbridge is the commercial, educational, financial, industrial and transportation centre of southern Alberta. The city's economy developed from drift mining for coal in the late 19th century and agriculture in the early 20th century. Half of the workforce is employed in the health, education, retail, and hospitality sectors, and the top five employers are government-based. Post-secondary institutes in the city include the University of Lethbridge, the only university in Alberta south of Calgary, as well as Lethbridge Polytechnic and Red Crow College. Cultural venues in the city include performing art theatres, galleries, museums, gardens, and sports centres.

== History ==
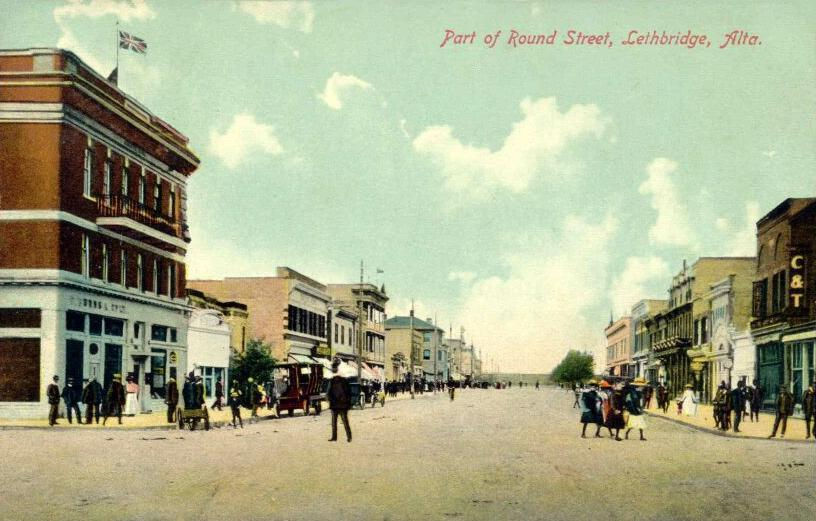
Round Street in 1911

Before the 19th century, the Lethbridge area was populated by several First Nations at various times. The Blackfoot referred to the area as Aksaysim ("steep banks"), Mek-kio-towaghs ("painted rock"), Assini-etomochi ("where we slaughtered the Cree") and Sik-ooh-kotok ("coal"). The Tsuutʼina (Sarcee) referred to it as Chadish-kashi ("black/rocks"), the Cree as Kuskusukisay-guni ("black/rocks"), and the Nakoda (Stoney) as Ipubin-saba-akabin ("digging coal"). The Kutenai referred to it as ʔa•kwum.

After the United States Army stopped alcohol trading with the Blackfeet Nation in Montana in 1869, traders John J. Healy and Alfred B. Hamilton started a whisky trading post at Fort Hamilton, near the future site of Lethbridge. The post's nickname became Fort Whoop-Up. The whisky trade led to the Cypress Hills Massacre of many native Assiniboine in 1873. The North-West Mounted Police, sent to stop the trade and establish order, arrived at Fort Whoop-Up on October 9, 1874. They managed the post for the next 12 years.

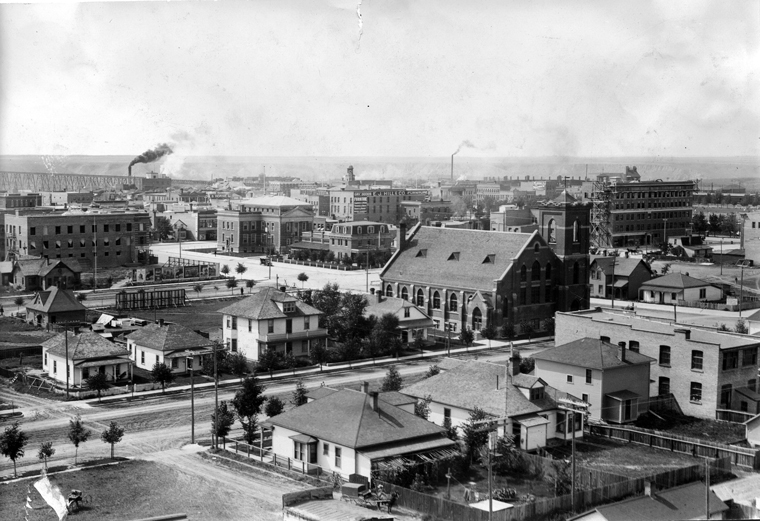
Downtown Lethbridge in 1911

Lethbridge's economy developed from drift mines opened by Nicholas Sheran in 1874 and the North Western Coal and Navigation Company in 1882. North Western's president was William Lethbridge, from whom the city derives its name. By the turn of the century, the mines employed about 150 men and produced 300 t (300 long tons; 330 short tons) of coal each day. In 1896, local collieries were the largest coal producers in the Northwest Territories, with production peaking during World War I. An internment camp was set up at the Exhibition Building in Lethbridge from September 1914 to November 1916. After the war, increasing oil and natural gas production gradually replaced coal production, and the last mine in Lethbridge closed in 1957.

The first rail line in Lethbridge was opened on August 28, 1885, by the Alberta Railway and Coal Company, which bought the North Western Coal and Navigation Company five years later. The rail industry's dependence on coal and the Canadian Pacific Railway's (CPR) efforts to settle southern Alberta with immigrants boosted Lethbridge's economy. After the CPR moved the divisional point of its Crowsnest Line from Fort Macleod to Lethbridge in 1905 and a new Lethbridge Canadian Pacific Railway Station (Union Station) was built in 1906, the city became the regional centre for Southern Alberta. In the mid-1980s, the CPR moved its rail yards in downtown Lethbridge to nearby Kipp, and Lethbridge ceased to be a rail hub.

Between 1907 and 1913, a development boom happened in Lethbridge, making it the main marketing, distribution and service centre in southern Alberta. Such municipal projects as a water treatment plant, a power plant, a Lethbridge Transit, a streetcar system, and Exhibition Park—as well as a construction boom and rising real estate prices—transformed the mining town into a significant city. Between World War I and World War II, however, the city experienced an economic slump. Development slowed, drought drove farmers from their farms, and coal mining rapidly declined from its peak. After World War II, irrigation of farmland near Lethbridge led to growth in the city's population and economy. Lethbridge became a centre for post-secondary education in Southern Alberta with the opening of Lethbridge Polytechnic (formerly Lethbridge College) in April 1957 and the University of Lethbridge in 1967. The University of Lethbridge campus moved to the west side of the Oldman River in 1971, marking the beginning of developmental expansion into the area.

From March 2018 to August 2020, Lethbridge was home to ARCHES, 24-hour supervised drug use site. It was the busiest SCS in North America with 663 visits a day. The Star called it a "new landmark". The SCS featured injection drug and inhalation drug facilities and it was a subject of disagreement by the nearby business community. The site closed at the end of August 2020 after the province removed grant funding following discovery of misappropriation of public funds.

== Geography ==
Map of southern Alberta

Map of Lethbridge

The city of Lethbridge is located at 49.7° north latitude and 112.833° west longitude and covers an area of 127.19 km^{2} (49.11 sq mi). It is divided by the Oldman River; its valley, the Oldman River valley parks system, has been turned into one of the largest urban park systems in North America at 16 km^{2} (4,000 acres) of protected land. Lethbridge is Alberta's third-largest city by population and area after Calgary and Edmonton. It is located near the Canadian Rockies, 210 km (130 mi) southeast of Calgary.

Lethbridge is split into three geographical areas: north, south and west. The Oldman River separates West Lethbridge from the other two, while Crowsnest Trail and the Canadian Pacific Kansas City rail line separate North and South Lethbridge. The newest and largest of the three areas, West Lethbridge (pop. 40,898) is home to the University of Lethbridge—which opened at that site in 1971. Although several farms existed on what is now the Westside, the first housing development was not completed until 1974 and Whoop-Up Drive access opened only in 1975. Much of the city's recent growth has been on the west side, and it has the youngest median age of the three. The north side (pop. 28,172) was originally populated by workers from local coal mines. It has the oldest population of the three areas, is home to multiple industrial parks and includes the former Hamlet of Hardieville, which was annexed by Lethbridge in 1978. South Lethbridge (pop. 32,412) is the commercial heart of the city; it contains the downtown core, Downtown Lethbridge, the bulk of retail and hospitality establishments, and the Lethbridge Polytechnic.

=== Climate ===
Lethbridge has a semi-arid climate (Köppen climate classification BSk) with an average maximum temperature of 12.8 °C (55.0 °F) and an average minimum temperature of −1.1 °C (30.0 °F). With precipitation averaging 380.2 mm (14.97 in), and 264 dry days on average, Lethbridge is the eleventh driest city in Canada. Mean relative humidity in the morning hovers between 69 and 78% throughout the year, but afternoon mean relative humidity is more uneven, ranging from 38% in August to 58% in January. On average, Lethbridge has 116 days with wind speed of 40 km/h (25 mph) or higher, ranking it as the second city in Canada for such weather.

Its high elevation of 929 m (3,048 ft) and close proximity to the Rocky Mountains provides Lethbridge with cooler summers than other locations in the Canadian Prairies. These factors protect the city from strong northwest and southwest winds and contribute to frequent Chinook winds during the winter. Lethbridge winters have the highest temperatures in the prairies, reducing the severity and duration of winter cold periods and resulting in fewer days with snow cover. The average daytime temperature peaks by the end of July/beginning of August, when it reaches 26.4 °C (79.5 °F). The city's temperature reaches a maximum high of 35.0 °C (95.0 °F) or greater on average once or twice a year.

The highest temperature ever recorded in Lethbridge was 40.5 °C (104.9 °F) on August 10, 2018. The lowest temperature ever recorded was −42.8 °C (−45.0 °F) on January 7, 1909; December 18, 1924; January 3, 1950; and December 29, 1968.

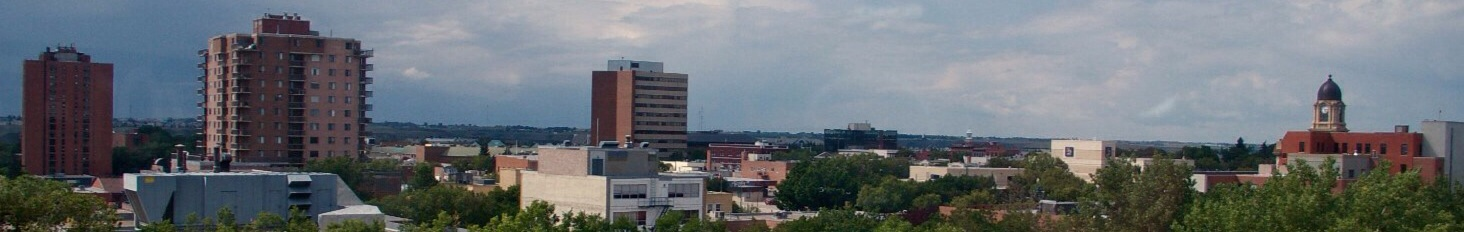
Lethbridge seen from Halmrast Manor

Climate data for Lethbridge Airport, 1991–2020 normals, extremes 1886–present
Month	Jan	Feb	Mar	Apr	May	Jun	Jul	Aug	Sep	Oct	Nov	Dec	Year
Record high humidex	20.0	21.8	26.3	30.2	35.4	37.7	41.7	40.1	36.1	30.1	23.0	17.8	41.7
Record high °C (°F)	20.0 (68.0)	21.8 (71.2)	26.8 (80.2)	33.9 (93.0)	34.2 (93.6)	38.3 (100.9)	40.0 (104.0)	40.5 (104.9)	36.7 (98.1)	31.7 (89.1)	23.3 (73.9)	19.4 (66.9)	40.5 (104.9)
Mean daily maximum °C (°F)	0.1 (32.2)	1.7 (35.1)	6.4 (43.5)	12.6 (54.7)	18.2 (64.8)	21.8 (71.2)	26.3 (79.3)	26.3 (79.3)	21.0 (69.8)	13.3 (55.9)	5.5 (41.9)	0.7 (33.3)	12.8 (55.1)
Daily mean °C (°F)	−6.0 (21.2)	−4.6 (23.7)	−0.2 (31.6)	5.7 (42.3)	11.1 (52.0)	15.1 (59.2)	18.4 (65.1)	17.9 (64.2)	13.2 (55.8)	6.4 (43.5)	−0.5 (31.1)	−5.3 (22.5)	5.9 (42.7)
Mean daily minimum °C (°F)	−12.1 (10.2)	−11.0 (12.2)	−6.8 (19.8)	−1.3 (29.7)	3.9 (39.0)	8.3 (46.9)	10.5 (50.9)	9.4 (48.9)	5.3 (41.5)	−0.6 (30.9)	−6.6 (20.1)	−11.2 (11.8)	−1.0 (30.2)
Record low °C (°F)	−42.8 (−45.0)	−42.2 (−44.0)	−38 (−36)	−27.2 (−17.0)	−12.8 (9.0)	−3.3 (26.1)	0.0 (32.0)	−1.7 (28.9)	−15.6 (3.9)	−26.7 (−16.1)	−35.6 (−32.1)	−42.8 (−45.0)	−42.8 (−45.0)
Record low wind chill	−54.5	−51.3	−49.7	−32.6	−16.3	−6.9	0.0	−2.6	−13.9	−36	−47.1	−55.7	−55.7
Average precipitation mm (inches)	11.0 (0.43)	10.3 (0.41)	16.6 (0.65)	28.4 (1.12)	57.2 (2.25)	92.9 (3.66)	39.9 (1.57)	32.5 (1.28)	32.1 (1.26)	24.2 (0.95)	15.9 (0.63)	11.5 (0.45)	372.5 (14.66)
Average rainfall mm (inches)	0.2 (0.01)	0.4 (0.02)	2.0 (0.08)	19.2 (0.76)	45.4 (1.79)	96.6 (3.80)	37.7 (1.48)	32.7 (1.29)	34.7 (1.37)	12.6 (0.50)	2.3 (0.09)	0.5 (0.02)	284.3 (11.21)
Average snowfall cm (inches)	13.3 (5.2)	15.1 (5.9)	18.0 (7.1)	13.1 (5.2)	5.1 (2.0)	0.0 (0.0)	0.0 (0.0)	1.3 (0.5)	1.3 (0.5)	9.5 (3.7)	16.4 (6.5)	14.8 (5.8)	107.9 (42.4)
Average precipitation days (≥ 0.2 mm)	8.4	6.8	9.2	10.4	12.8	13.5	10.5	8.5	9.4	7.6	8.5	7.9	113.4
Average rainy days (≥ 0.2 mm)	0.29	0.17	1.3	6.9	11.0	12.9	9.2	7.7	9.1	5.3	2.1	0.59	66.5
Average snowy days (≥ 0.2 cm)	8.0	7.2	7.6	4.1	1.4	0.0	0.0	0.18	0.38	2.7	6.6	6.7	44.8
Average relative humidity (%) (at 15:00 LST)	59.9	53.9	49.7	40.4	40.5	44.5	39.2	36.6	39.9	44.4	56.9	57.3	46.9
Mean monthly sunshine hours	110.2	147.0	186.1	233.4	277.0	290.3	322.1	297.5	228.5	189.7	119.1	106.5	2,507.3
Percentage possible sunshine	41.1	51.5	50.6	56.7	58.2	59.7	65.6	66.5	60.2	56.6	43.5	41.8	54.3
Source: Environment and Climate Change Canada

== Demographics ==
Federal census population history
Year	Pop.	±%
1901	2,072	—
1906	2,313	+11.6%
1911	8,050	+248.0%
1916	9,436	+17.2%
1921	11,097	+17.6%
1926	10,735	−3.3%
1931	13,489	+25.7%
1936	13,523	+0.3%
1941	14,612	+8.1%
1946	16,522	+13.1%
1951	22,947	+38.9%
1956	29,462	+28.4%
1961	35,454	+20.3%
1966	37,186	+4.9%
1971	41,217	+10.8%
1976	46,752	+13.4%
1981	54,072	+15.7%
1986	58,841	+8.8%
1991	60,974	+3.6%
1996	63,053	+3.4%
2001	67,374	+6.9%
2006	74,637	+10.8%
2011	83,517	+11.9%
2016	92,729	+11.0%
2021	98,406	+6.1%
Source: Statistics Canada

In the 2021 Canadian census conducted by Statistics Canada, the City of Lethbridge had a population of 98,406 living in 40,225 of its 42,862 total private dwellings, a change of 6.1% from its 2016 population of 92,729. With a land area of 121.12 km^{2} (46.76 sq mi), it had a population density of 812.5/km^{2} (2,104.3/sq mi) in 2021.

At the census metropolitan area (CMA) level in the 2021 census, the Lethbridge CMA had a population of 123,847 living in 48,647 of its 51,735 total private dwellings, a change of 5.5% from its 2016 population of 117,394. With a land area of 2,958.96 km^{2} (1,142.46 sq mi), it had a population density of 41.9/km^{2} (108.4/sq mi) in 2021.

The population of the City of Lethbridge according to its 2019 municipal census was 101,482, a change of 1.7% from its 2018 municipal census population of 99,769. With the 2019 municipal census results, the City of Lethbridge became the fourth city in Alberta to surpass 100,000 people.

In its 2023 municipal census, the City of Lethbridge's population was found to have grown to 106,550, an increase of 4.99% from its 2019 municipal census population of 101,482.

In the 2016 Canadian census conducted by Statistics Canada, the City of Lethbridge had a population of 92,729 living in 37,575 of its 39,867 total private dwellings, a change of 11% from its 2011 population of 83,517. With a land area of 122.09 km^{2} (47.14 sq mi), it had a population density of 759.5/km^{2} (1,967.1/sq mi) in 2016. The same census reported that the metropolitan area of Lethbridge was 117,394 in 2016, up from 105,999 in 2011. Subsequent data from Statistics Canada showed that the 2020 metropolitan population was 128,851, an increase of 1.5% over the previous year.

=== Religion ===
In 2021, 49.8% of residents were Christians, down from 64.6% in 2011. 16.1% of the population were Catholic, 12.9% were Protestant, and 11.3% were Christians of unspecified denomination. All other Christian denominations and Christian-related traditions made up 9.6%, including a large population of The Church of Jesus Christ of Latter-day Saints adherents (5.8%). 44.3% of the population was nonreligious or secular, up from 32.4% in 2011. 8.1% followed a religion (or spiritual belief) other than Christianity. The largest non-Christian religions were Islam (1.9%), Hinduism (1.3%), and Buddhism (1.1%).

=== Language ===
According to the 2021 census, 83.9% of residents spoke English as a first language. Other common mother tongues were Spanish (1.6%),Tagalog (1.4%), Nepali (1.0%), German (0.9%), French (0.8%), Chinese Languages (0.7%), Arabic (0.7%) and Dutch (0.6%). 1.7% of residents claimed both English and a non-official language as their first language.

=== Ethnicity ===
Largest ethnic origin in Lethbridge CMA by census tract based on the 2021 census

The most common ethnicities in Lethbridge as per the 2021 census are English (22.9%), German (19.2%), Scottish (17.3%), Irish (13.6%), Canadian (13.4%), Dutch (7.3%), French (7.3%), Ukrainian (6.7%), Norwegian (4.7%), and Polish (3.7%).

Lethbridge had 12.9% visible minorities and 7.1% Aboriginal in 2016. Below is a full break down of the demographics. The city is also the home of the largest Bhutanese community in Canada.

Largest non-European panethnic group in Lethbridge CMA by census tract by census tract based on the 2021 census

Panethnic groups in the City of Lethbridge (1986−2021)
Panethnic group	2021		2016		2011		2006		2001		1996		1991		1986	
Panethnic group	Pop.	%	Pop.	%	Pop.	%	Pop.	%	Pop.	%	Pop.	%	Pop.	%	Pop.	%
European (Note: Statistic includes all persons that did not make up part of a visible minority or an indigenous identity.)	74,245	77.12%	73,505	81.24%	70,630	86.78%	65,000	88.42%	60,150	90.77%	55,520	89.27%	52,760	87.65%	52,945	91.18%
Indigenous	6,395	6.64%	5,290	5.85%	3,770	4.63%	3,455	4.7%	2,290	3.46%	1,810	2.91%	2,980	4.95%	1,710	2.94%
Southeast Asian (Note: Statistic includes total responses of "Filipino" and "Southeast Asian" under visible minority section on census.)	3,105	3.23%	2,390	2.64%	1,125	1.38%	655	0.89%	395	0.6%	555	0.89%	515	0.86%	230	0.34%
African	3,105	3.23%	1,895	2.09%	805	0.99%	410	0.56%	205	0.31%	230	0.37%	115	0.19%	55	0.09%
East Asian (Note: Statistic includes total responses of "Chinese", "Korean", and "Japanese" under visible minority section on census.)	3,065	3.18%	2,770	3.06%	2,885	3.54%	2,360	3.21%	2,495	3.76%	2,990	4.81%	3,085	5.13%	2,675	4.61%
South Asian	2,990	3.11%	2,055	2.27%	920	1.13%	575	0.78%	265	0.4%	235	0.38%	290	0.48%	70	0.11%
Latin American	1,955	2.03%	1,510	1.67%	680	0.84%	705	0.96%	365	0.55%	705	1.13%	365	0.61%	275	0.47%
Middle Eastern (Note: Statistic includes total responses of "West Asian" and "Arab" under visible minority section on census.)	740	0.77%	720	0.8%	235	0.29%	230	0.31%	40	0.06%	55	0.09%	85	0.14%	105	0.18%
Other / Multiracial (Note: Statistic includes total responses of "Visible minority, n.i.e." and "Multiple visible minorities" under visible minority section on census.)	665	0.69%	350	0.39%	335	0.41%	130	0.18%	65	0.1%	85	0.14%	—N/a	—N/a	—N/a	—N/a
Total responses	96,275	97.83%	90,480	97.57%	81,390	97.45%	73,515	98.5%	66,270	98.36%	62,190	98.63%	60,195	98.72%	58,065	98.68%
Total population	98,406	100%	92,729	100%	83,517	100%	74,637	100%	67,374	100%	63,053	100%	60,974	100%	58,841	100%
Note: Totals greater than 100% due to multiple origin responses

== Economy ==
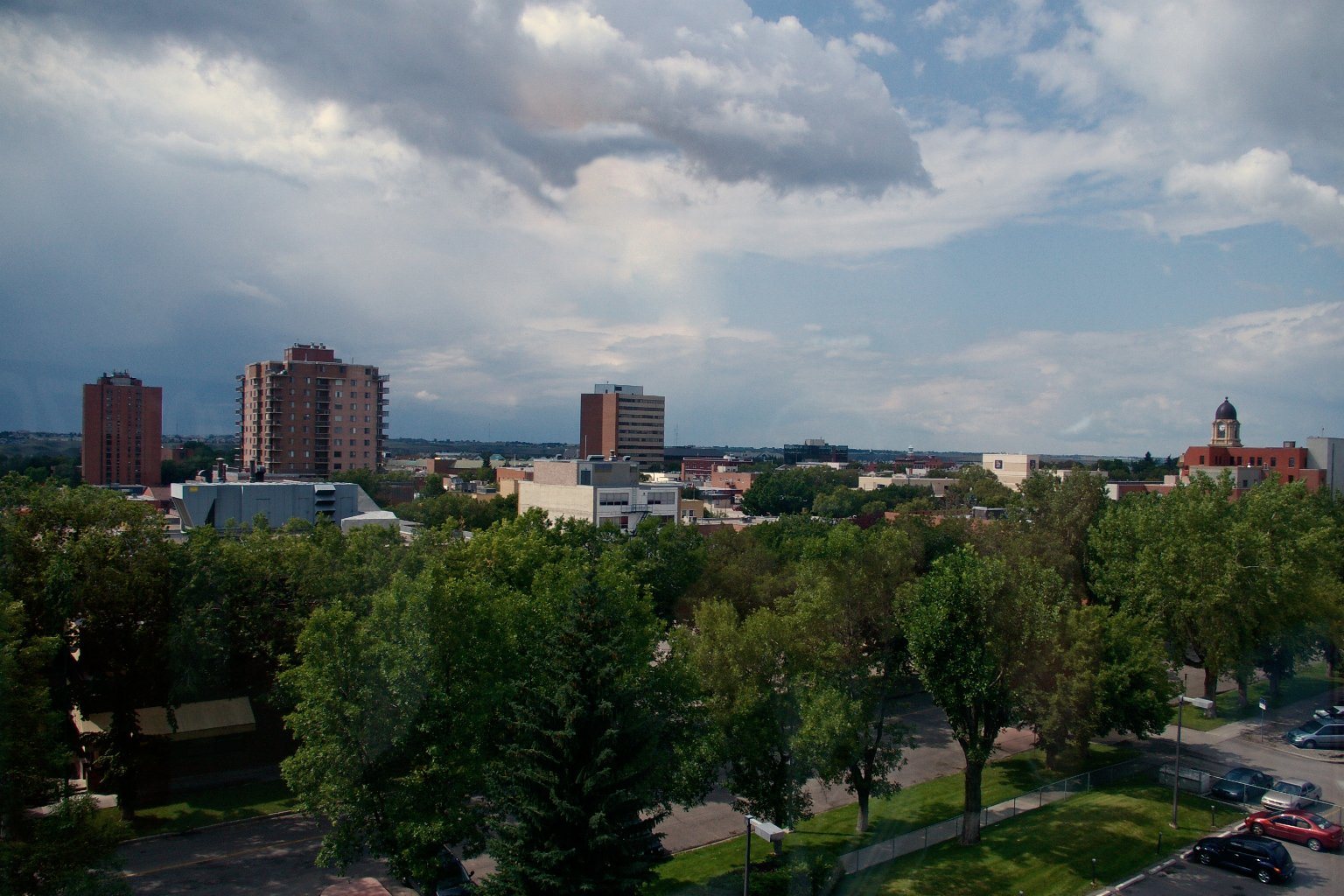
Downtown Lethbridge, facing northwest from 8th St. & 6th Ave. South

Lethbridge is southern Alberta's commercial, distribution, financial and industrial centre (although Medicine Hat plays a similar role in southeastern Alberta). It has a trading area population of 341,180, including parts of British Columbia, and provides jobs for up to 86,000 people who commute to and within the city from a radius of 100 km (62 mi).

Lethbridge's economy has traditionally been agriculture-based and is still home to many agri-food processors and the Lethbridge Research and Development Centre; however, it has diversified in recent years. Half of the workforce is employed in the health, education, retail and hospitality sectors, and the top five employers are government-based. Several national companies are based in Lethbridge. From its founding in 1935, Canadian Freightways based its head office there until moving operations to Calgary in 1948, though its call centre remains in Lethbridge. Taco Time Canada was based in the city from 1978 to 1995 before moving to Calgary. Minute Muffler, which began in 1969, is based in Lethbridge. International shipping company H & R Transport has been based in the city since 1955. Braman Furniture, which has locations in Manitoba and Ontario, was headquartered in Lethbridge from 1991 to 2008.

Lethbridge serves as a hub for commercial activity in the region by providing services and amenities. There are many transport services in Lethbridge, including Red Arrow buses, four provincial highways, rail service and Lethbridge Airport, are concentrated in or near the city. In 2004, the police services of Lethbridge and Coaldale combined to form the Lethbridge Police Service. Lethbridge provides municipal water to Coaldale, Coalhurst, Diamond City, Iron Springs, Monarch, Shaughnessy and Turin.

In 2002, the municipal government organized Economic Development Lethbridge, a body responsible for promoting and developing the city's commercial interests. Two years later, the city joined in a partnership with 24 other local communities to create an economic development alliance called SouthGrow, representing a population of over 140,000. In 2006, Economic Development Lethbridge partnered with SouthGrow Regional Initiative and Alberta SouthWest Regional Alliance to create the Southern Alberta Alternative Energy Partnership. This partnership promotes business related to alternative energy, including wind power, solar power and biofuel, in the region.

== Arts and culture ==
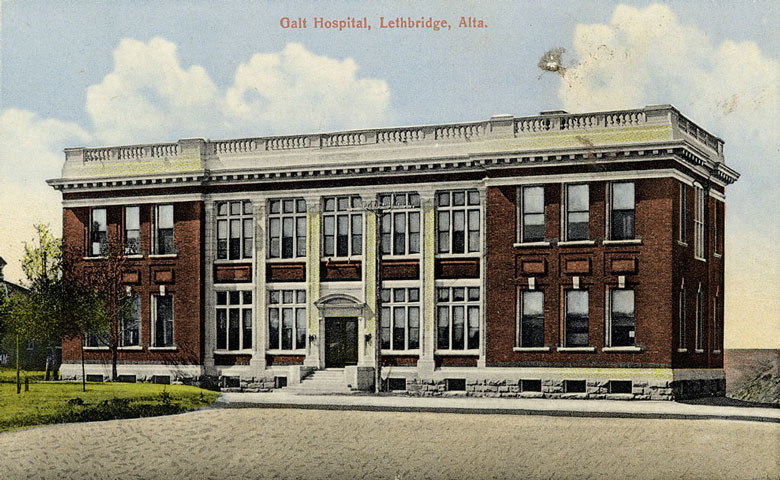
Galt Hospital, shown here in 1910, is now the Galt Museum.

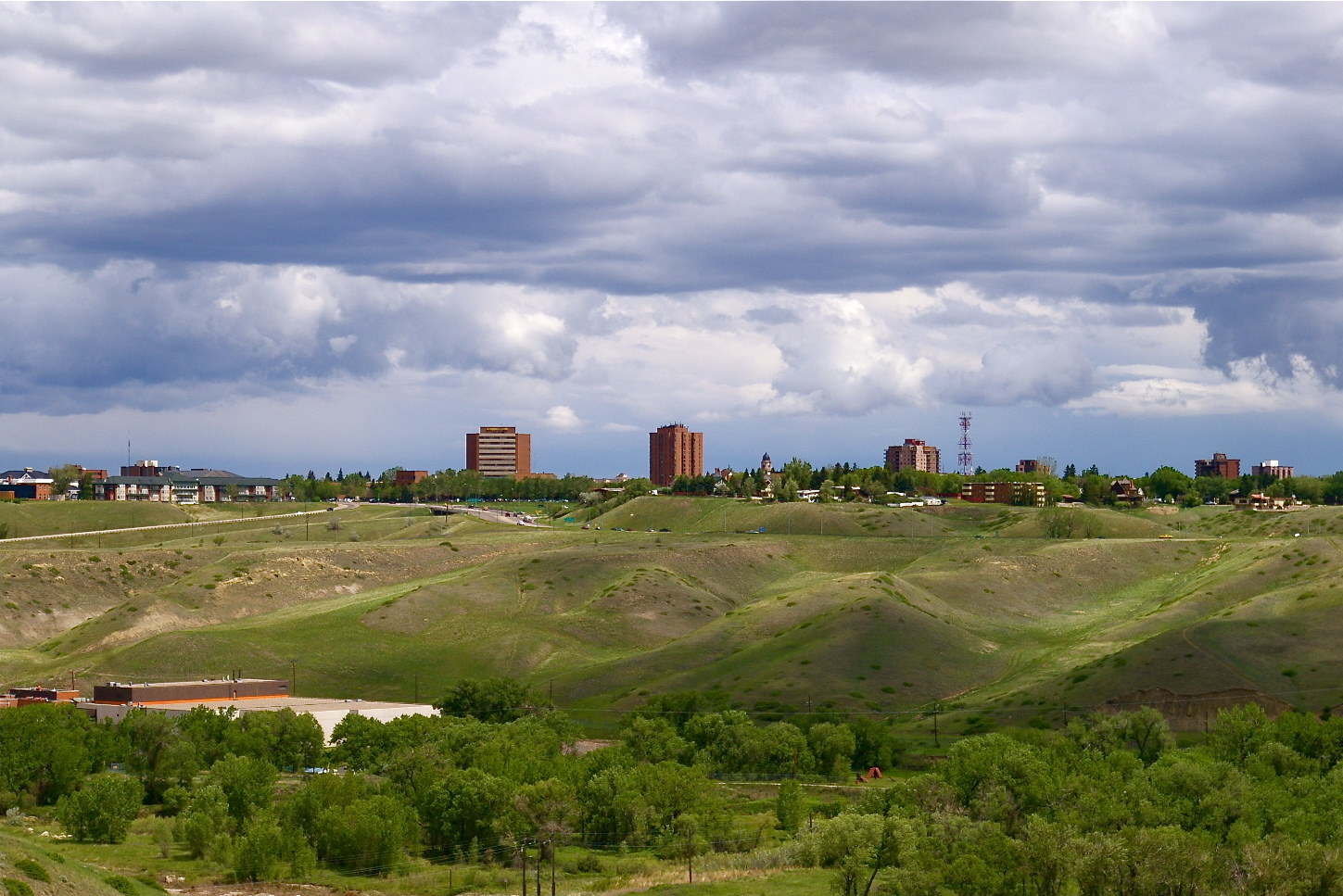
Skyline of downtown Lethbridge

Lethbridge was designated a Cultural Capital of Canada for the 2004–2005 season. The Southern Alberta Ethnic Association (Multicultural Heritage Centre) promotes multiculturalism and ethnic heritage in the community.

The city is home to venues and organizations promoting the arts. Founded in 1958, the Allied Arts Council of Lethbridge is the largest organization in the city dedicated to preserving and enhancing the local arts. In the spring of 2007, the Allied Arts Council Facilities Steering Committee initiated the Arts Re:Building Together Campaign, a grass roots campaign initiative to raise awareness and support for improving arts facilities in Lethbridge. The campaign identified three arts buildings: the Yates Memorial Centre, the Bowman Arts Centre, and the Southern Alberta Art Gallery as cornerstone facilities in the community requiring care and attention. On July 14, 2007, the Finance Committee of City Council approved four arts capital projects for inclusion in the city's Ten Year Capital Plan. Under the campaign to 2010, the renovation and expansion of the Southern Alberta Art Gallery was completed, a new Community Arts Centre will be built in downtown Lethbridge, the City of Lethbridge has a Public Art Program, and a committee was formed to research the possibility of a new Performing Arts Centre in Lethbridge.

Lethbridge has a public library and three major museum/galleries. The Southern Alberta Art Gallery is a contemporary gallery; the community arts centre Casa, administered by the Allied Arts Council; and the University of Lethbridge Art Gallery produces contemporary exhibitions including works from its extensive collection of Canadian, American and European art.

The city is also home to the Lethbridge Symphony, which was founded in 1960 and incorporated as a non-profit in 1961. It has produced several spin-off music groups, including the Southern Alberta Chamber Orchestra, and the still-active Lethbridge Musical Theatre, which produces an annual show. Vox Musica, which traces its roots back to 1968, is a community choir previously based at the University of Lethbridge. As a fully independent non-profit society, Vox Musica continues to rehearse and perform at Southminster United Church and around the community. Theatrical productions are presented by the University of Lethbridge's drama department and New West Theatre, which performs at the Genevieve E. Yates Memorial Centre using its two theatres: the 500-seat proscenium Yates Theatre and the 180-seat black box Sterndale Bennett Theatre.

Lethbridge hosts a number of annual festivals and events throughout the year including Kiwanis Music Festival, Lethbridge Independent Film Festival, Centric Music Festival, Lethbridge Pride Fest, Street Machine Weekend, Lethbridge Dragon Boat Festival, Word on the Street, Lethbridge Electronic Music Festival, and many more. The best-known event in Lethbridge is Whoop-Up Days, a rodeo and fair held annually in August.

=== Coat of arms ===
Coat of arms of Lethbridge

The Coat of arms of Lethbridge is an official symbol of the city. It was designed by Reverend John Stanley Chivers and adopted on September 16, 1907.

The shield is a roundel with three divisions, blue (azure), red (gules) and brown (ochre), with charges depicting a locomotive (for transportation), a sheaf of wheat (for agriculture) and a hand with pickaxe (for coal mining) as the foundation of the early economy of the city. A circular scroll reads City of Lethbridge • 1890 • 1906, the town and city incorporation years respectively.

The compartment consists of a panoramic southern Alberta scene portraying strip farming and a mine tipple against a background of mountains and foothills. It rests on the city motto: Ad occasionis januam (Latin for "Gateway to Opportunity"). A mural crown in the crest symbolises the city status and Canada's historical allegiance to the British crown.

== Attractions ==
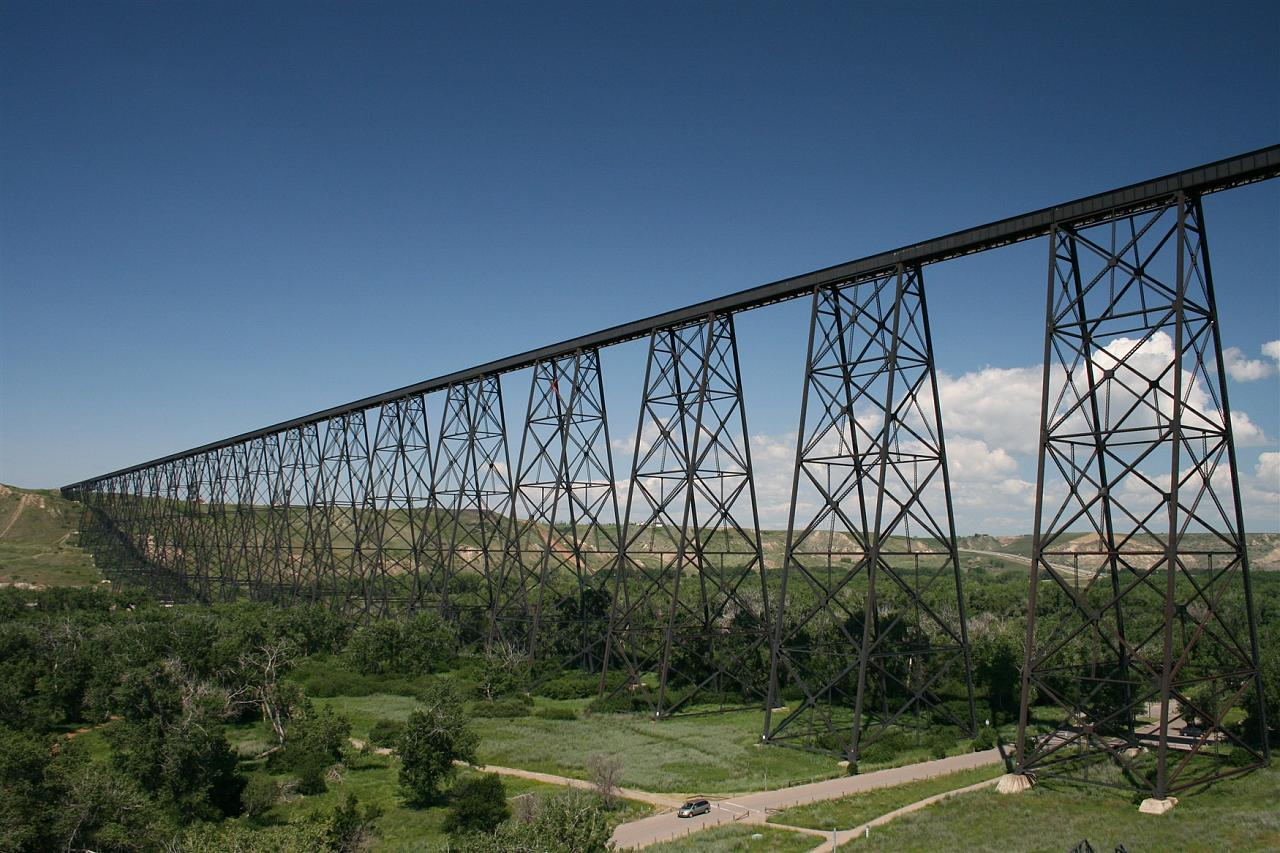
High Level Bridge near downtown Lethbridge

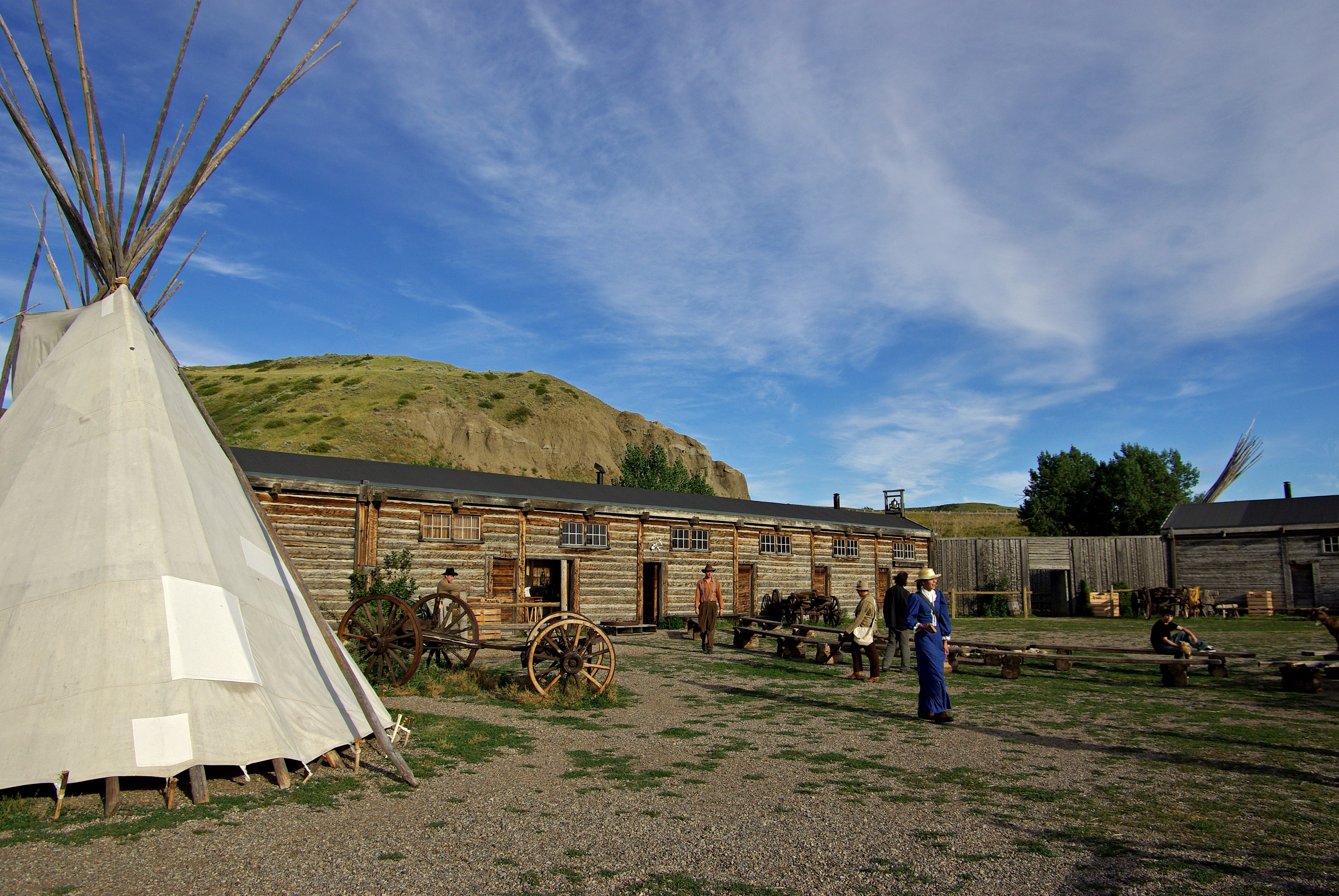
Fort Whoop-Up National Historic Site

The city, which began as a frontier town, has several historical attractions. The Lethbridge Viaduct, commonly known as the High Level Bridge, is the longest and highest steel trestle bridge in North America. It was completed in 1909 on what was then the city's western edge. Indian Battle Park, in the coulees of the Oldman River, commemorates the last battle between the Cree and the Blackfoot First Nations in 1870.

Originally known as Fort Hamilton, Fort Whoop-Up was a centre of illegal activities during the late 19th century. It was first built in 1869 by J.J. Healy and A.B. Hamilton as a whisky post and was destroyed by fire a year later. A second, sturdier structure later replaced the fort.

As the cultural centre of southern Alberta, Lethbridge has notable cultural attractions. Nikka Yuko Japanese Garden in south Lethbridge was opened in 1967 as part of a Canadian centennial celebration attended by Japan's Prince and Princess Takamatsu. The Galt Museum & Archives is the largest museum in the Lethbridge area; the building housing the museum served as the city's main hospital during the late 19th century and early 20th centuries. Several other important attractions are based in Lethbridge, including the Lethbridge Military Museum and the Helen Schuler Nature Centre which educates about the river bottom and coulees.

Several structures such as the historic post office are prominent on the skyline of Lethbridge. Less well-known than the High Level Bridge, the post office is one of the most distinctive buildings in Lethbridge. Built in 1912, the four-storey structure is crowned by a functioning clock tower. Other prominent buildings include office towers; the water tower, which was originally built in 1958 and sold to a private developer who converted it into a restaurant; and the Alberta Terminals grain elevators.

The Lethbridge Research and Development Centre (LRDC), established in 1906, is one of the largest facilities in Agriculture and Agri-Food Canada's national network of 20 research centres spread across Canada. The LRDC has over 400 staff and operates on 1,285 acres (520 ha; 2.008 sq mi) of arable land in Lethbridge and around Southern Alberta, with its research focusing on beef cattle production and sustainable dry-land agriculture. Fairfield Gardens is located on the grounds of the research centre and features the 120 year old, heritage-listed Fairfield Poplar.

== Sports and recreation ==
Henderson Lake

Lethbridge has designated 16 percent of the land within city boundaries as parkland, including the 755 hectares (1,870 acres) Oldman River valley parks system. It has facilities for field sports, numerous baseball diamonds, the Spitz Stadium, the Nicholas Sheran Park (a disc golf course), two skateparks, a BMX track, a climbing wall, a dozen tennis courts, and seven pools. It is home to five golf courses, including the award-winning Paradise Canyon Golf Resort, and is within 30 km (19 mi) of several others.

Built for the 1975 Canada Winter Games, the VisitLethbridge.com Arena, formerly the |ENMAX Centre, is Lethbridge's multipurpose arena. The 6,500-seat facility has hosted concerts, three-ring circuses, multicultural events, national curling championships, basketball events, banquets, skating events and is home to the Lethbridge Hurricanes, a major Western Hockey League franchise. The arena has a running track, racquetball and squash courts, and a full-size ice rink. In 1997, the 5,400 m^{2} (58,000 sq ft) Servus Sports Centre (originally the Lethbridge Soccer Centre) was built directly south of the ENMAX Centre and added two regulation size indoor soccer pitches to the complex. The Lethbridge Kyodokan Judo Club facility is located next to the Community Savings Place, and has been a Judo Canada Regional Training Centre since 2015.

On the city's west side, Phase 1 of the Cavendish Farms Centre, formerly the ATB Centre, a recreation complex, opened in 2016 and houses two hockey rinks and the Lethbridge Curling Club. Phase 2 of this project The Cor Van Ray YMCA opened in May 2019 and includes a field house with basketball courts and a 300m running track, as well as an aquatics centre with slides and a wave pool.

Several winter sports venues are in or near Lethbridge. The city has six indoor ice arenas with a total ice area of 11,220 m^{2} (120,800 sq ft) and a total seating capacity of 8,149. Other than the ENMAX Centre, all ice surfaces are available from October to April only. Lethbridge is 150 km (93 mi) east of the Castle Mountain ski resort.

Lethbridge hosted the inaugural championship match for the Western Women's Canadian Football League in 2011, while the city's WWCFL team, the Lethbridge Steel, played in three straight title matches from 2012 to 2014.

Current amateur teams
Team	Sport	League
Lethbridge Bulls	Baseball	Western Canadian Baseball League
Lethbridge Eagles	Hockey	Alberta Junior Female Hockey League
Lethbridge Hurricanes	Hockey	Western Hockey League
Lethbridge Steel	Canadian Football	Western Women's Canadian Football League

== Government ==
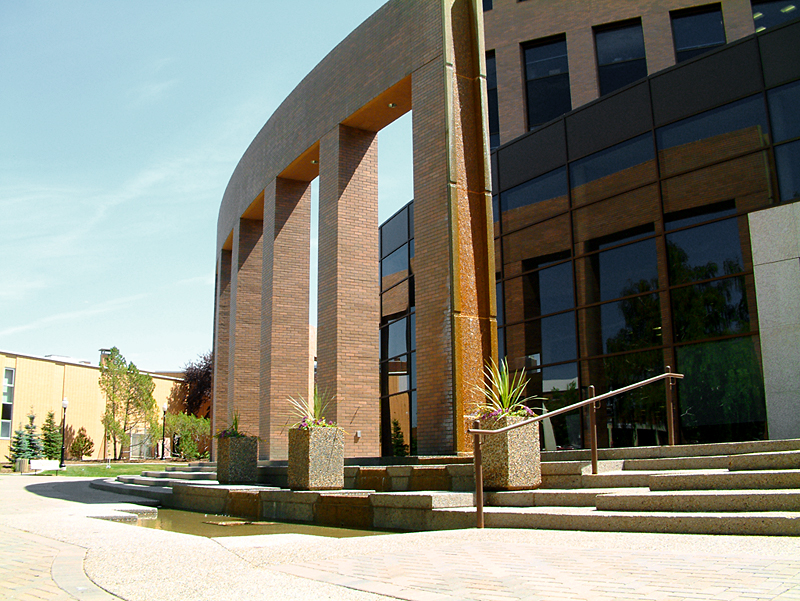
Lethbridge City Hall

Lethbridge federal election results
Year	Liberal		Conservative		New Democratic		Green	
2021	17%	8,040	52%	24,537	22%	10,085	0%	0
2019	16%	7,705	62%	30,935	17%	8,261	3%	1,677

Lethbridge provincial election results
Year	United Cons.		New Democratic	
2023	46%	20,523	50%	22,444
2019	48%	22,673	42%	19,791
2015	23%	8,681	53%	20,062

Eight councillors and a mayor make up the Lethbridge City Council. City voters elect a new government every four years. The last election was October 18, 2021, Lethbridge municipal election. Lethbridge does not have a ward system, so the mayor and all councillors are elected at large. The 2009–2011 operating budget of the City of Lethbridge was CA$250–278 million, more than half of which came from property tax. One member of parliament (MP) representing federal electoral district of Lethbridge sits in the House of Commons in Ottawa, and two members of Alberta's legislative assembly (MLAs), representing Lethbridge-East (UCP) and Lethbridge-West (NDP), sit in the Alberta Legislature Building in Edmonton.

Traditionally, political leanings in Lethbridge have been right-wing. Federally, from 1917 to 1930, Lethbridge voters switched between various federal parties, but from 1935 to 1957, they voted Social Credit in each election. Progressive Conservatives held office from 1958 until 1993, when the Reform Party of Canada was formed. The Reform party and its various subsequent incarnations such as the current Conservative Party of Canada have dominated the polls since. The city's two provincial electoral districts are represented by one government MLA, Nathan Neudorf for Lethbridge-East, and one opposition MLA, Rob Miyashiro for Lethbridge-West (following a by-election to replace Shannon Phillips).

Alberta Health Services, the provincial health authority that plans and delivers health services on behalf of the Ministry of Health, administers public health services in Lethbridge. Chinook Health oversees facilities in southwestern Alberta, such as the Chinook Regional Hospital and St. Michael's Health Centre.

== Transportation ==
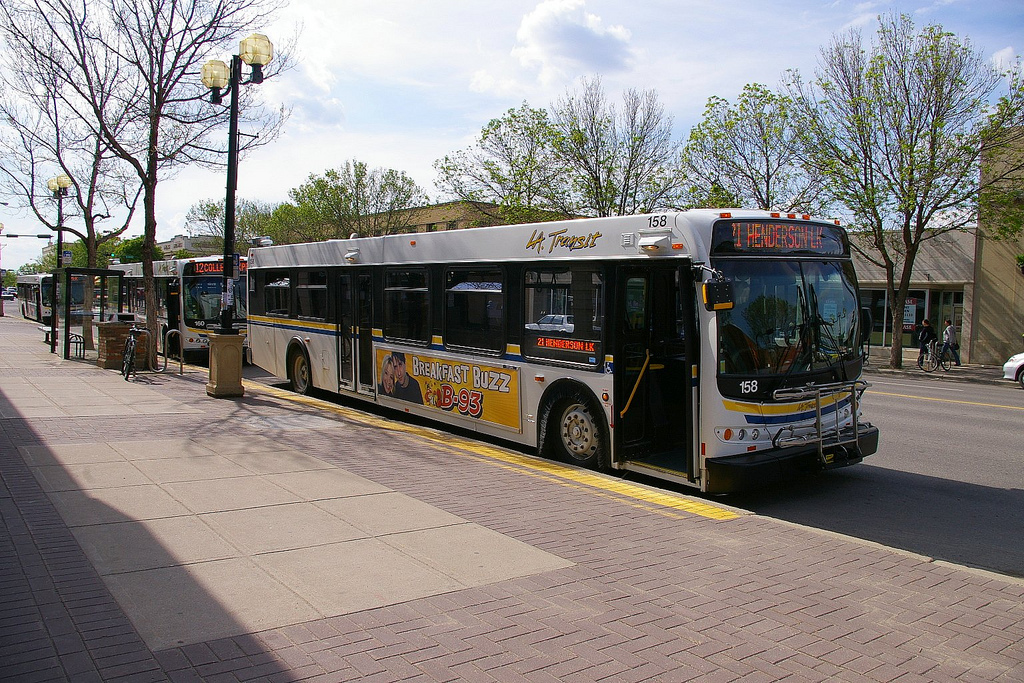
The downtown Lethbridge transit terminal

Mass transit in Lethbridge consists of 40 buses (with an average age of 10 years) operating on more than a dozen routes. Traditionally, bus routes in the city started and ended downtown. In the early 21st century, however, Lethbridge Transit introduced cross-town and shuttle routes, such as University of Lethbridge to Lethbridge Polytechnic, University of Lethbridge to the North Lethbridge terminal, and Lethbridge Polytechnic to the North Lethbridge terminal. Several routes converge near the Chinook Regional Hospital, although it is not officially a terminal.

The Parks and Recreation department maintains the citywide, 30 km (19 mi) pedestrian / cyclist Coal Banks Trail system. The system was designed to connect the Oldman River valley with other areas of the city, including Pavan Park in the north, Henderson Lake in the east, Highways 4 and 5 in the south and a loop in West Lethbridge (including University Drive and McMaster Blvd).

Four provincial highways (3, 4, 5, and 25) run through or terminate in Lethbridge. This has led to the creation of major arterial roads, including Mayor Magrath Drive, University Drive and Scenic Drive. This infrastructure and its location on the CANAMEX Corridor has helped make Lethbridge and its freight depots a major shipping destination. Lethbridge is 100 km (62 mi) north of the United States border via Highways 4 and 5 and 210 km (130 mi) south of Calgary via Highways 2 and 3. Highways 2, 3 and 4 form part of the CANAMEX Corridor, a trade route between Mexico, the United States, and Canada.

Lethbridge has a commercial airport, Lethbridge Airport, and the Canadian Pacific Kansas City (CPKC) rail yards in Kipp, Alberta (12 km [7.5 mi] away). The airport provides commercial flights to Calgary, industrial and corporate opportunities, as well as private and charter flights elsewhere. The airport provides customs services for flights arriving from the United States. Lethbridge Canadian Pacific Railway Station was served by passenger rail on the CPR line between 1906 and 1971. The rail yards were eventually moved to Kipp, just west of the city, from downtown Lethbridge in 1983. The yards were planned for redevelopment with a mix of multi-family residential, commercial and light industrial land uses. The Park Place Mall is now located on the portion of the former rail yards north of 1 Avenue South between Scenic Drive to the west and Stafford Drive to the east.

== Education ==
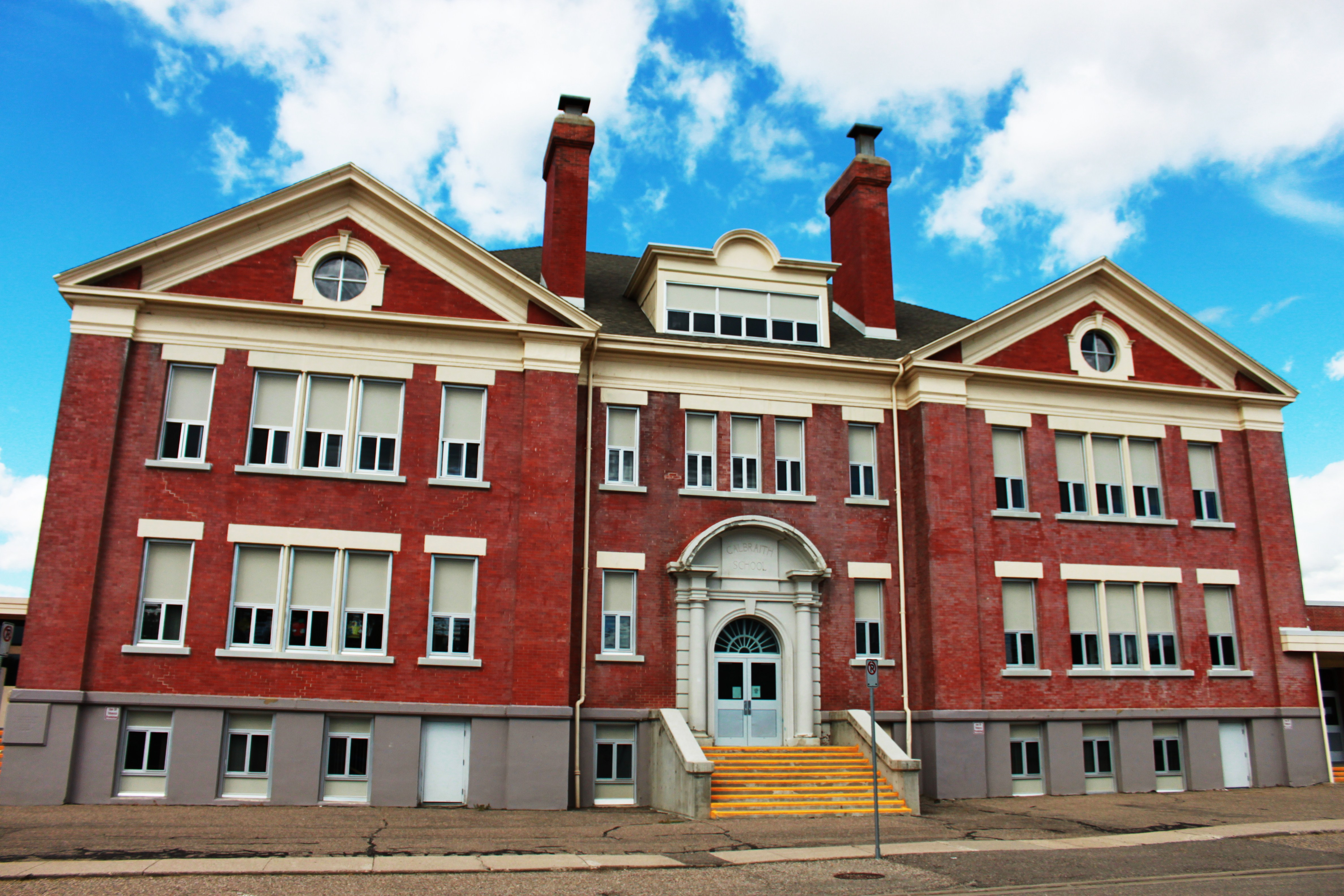
Galbraith School building c. 1920s, North Lethbridge

The Lethbridge School Division and the separate Holy Spirit Roman Catholic School Division administer grades kindergarten through 12 locally. The Palliser School Division, which is based in Lethbridge, administers public primary and secondary education in the outlying areas. Lethbridge School Division administers five high schools (Chinook High School, Immanuel Christian High School, Lethbridge Collegiate Institute, Victoria Park High School, and Winston Churchill High School), four middle schools, and 14 elementary schools in Lethbridge. Immanuel Christian covers grades 6 through 12. There is also a Francophone school in Lethbridge, which is part of the Francophone school board, Conseil scolaire FrancoSud, based in Calgary.

Lethbridge is home to Lethbridge Polytechnic, founded in 1957, and the University of Lethbridge, founded in 1967. Red Crow Community College has a campus in the city. During the 2015–2016 school year, the University of Lethbridge and the Lethbridge Polytechnic had a combined enrolment of 14,820, which represented 20% of the city's population.

== Media ==
Lethbridge is served by the daily Lethbridge Herald newspaper. The university and polytechnic both have a student-run, weekly newspaper. There are 12 FM radio stations, including CKXU-FM, a campus radio station located at the University of Lethbridge.

== Sister and friendship cities ==
As of 2025 Lethbridge has one sister city, three friendship cities, and three cities promoted by the Lethbridge Twinning Society.

=== Sister city ===
- Saint-Laurent, Canada (1967)

=== Friendship cities ===
- Haebaru, Japan (2003)
- Anyang, China (2004)
- Great Falls, United States (2014)

=== Lethbridge Twinning Society ===
- Culver City, United States (1989)
- Timashevsk, Russia (1985)
- Towada, Japan (2002)

== See also ==
- List of people from Lethbridge
- List of communities in Alberta
- List of cities in Alberta
