= 2007 Lethbridge municipal election =

← 2004	October 15, 2007	2010 →

Mayor and 8 aldermen to Lethbridge City Council
Leader	Bob Tarleck
Last election	15,333
Popular vote	Acclamation
Mayor before election
Bob Tarleck
Elected mayor
Bob Tarleck

The 2007 Lethbridge municipal election was held Monday, October 15, 2007, to elect eight aldermen (at-large), the seven Lethbridge School District No. 51 trustees (at-large), and five of the Holy Spirit Roman Catholic Separate Regional Division No. 4's nine trustees (as Ward 2). The incumbent mayor had no challengers. Since 1968, provincial legislation has required every municipality to hold triennial elections. Of the 65,835 eligible voters, only 14,896 turned in a ballot, a voter turnout of 22.6%, and an average of 5.7 aldermen per ballot.

== Results ==
Bold indicates elected, and incumbents are italicized.

=== Mayor ===
Mayor
Candidate	Vote
**Bob Tarleck**	**Acclamation**

=== Aldermen ===
Aldermen
Candidate	Votes	%
**Ryan Parker**	**9,899**	**66.5**
**Jeff Carlson**	**7,975**	**53.5**
**Tom Wickersham**	**7,909**	**53.1**
**Rajko Dodic**	**7,537**	**50.6**
**Ken Tratch**	**5,935**	**39.8**
**Margaret Simmons**	**5,928**	**39.8**
**Barbara Lacey**	**5,755**	**38.6**
**Shaun Ward**	**5,262**	**35.3**
Michelle Madge	5,049	33.9
Blaine Hyggen	4,935	33.1
Rick Homan	4,776	32.1
Brady Hway	3,523	23.7
Lesley Ferguson	2,973	20.0
James Conners	2,893	19.4
Jeff Graham	2,871	19.3
Kevin Layton	1,976	13.3

=== Public School Trustees ===
Lethbridge School District No. 51
Candidate	Votes
**Lea Switzer**	**4,741**
**Gary Bartlett**	**4,708**
**Mich Forster**	**4,349**
**Lola Major**	**4,181**
**Jan Foster**	**4,083**
**Tyler Demers**	**3,648**
**Keith Fowler**	**2,666**
Kirbey Lockhart	2,620
Brian Carlson	2,322
Dennis Wickham	2,067
Lewis Callahan	1,950
Daniel Forbes	1,620
Serge Forcier	1,353
Brooke Culley	1,298

=== Separate School Trustees ===
Holy Spirit Roman Catholic Separate Regional Division No. 4
Ward 2
Candidate	Votes
**Chris Spearman**	**2,422**
**Bosco Baptista**	**2,138**
**Sandra Dufresne**	**1,852**
**Danny Ponjavic**	**1,625**
**Bob Spitzig**	**1,489**
David Lynagh	1,392
