= 2021 Lethbridge municipal election =

Local election in Alberta, Canada

- October 18, 2021

Mayor and 8 councillors to Lethbridge City Council
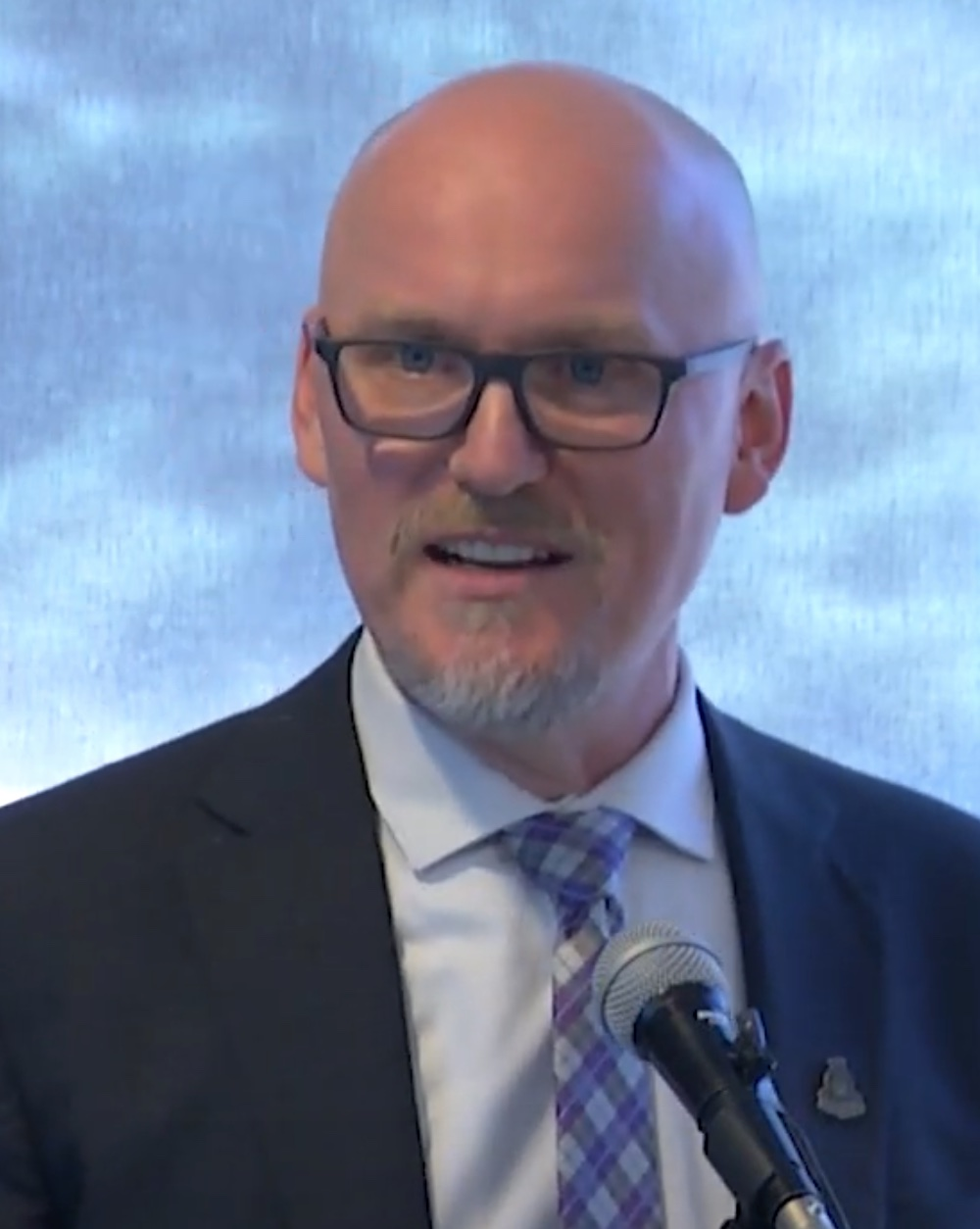

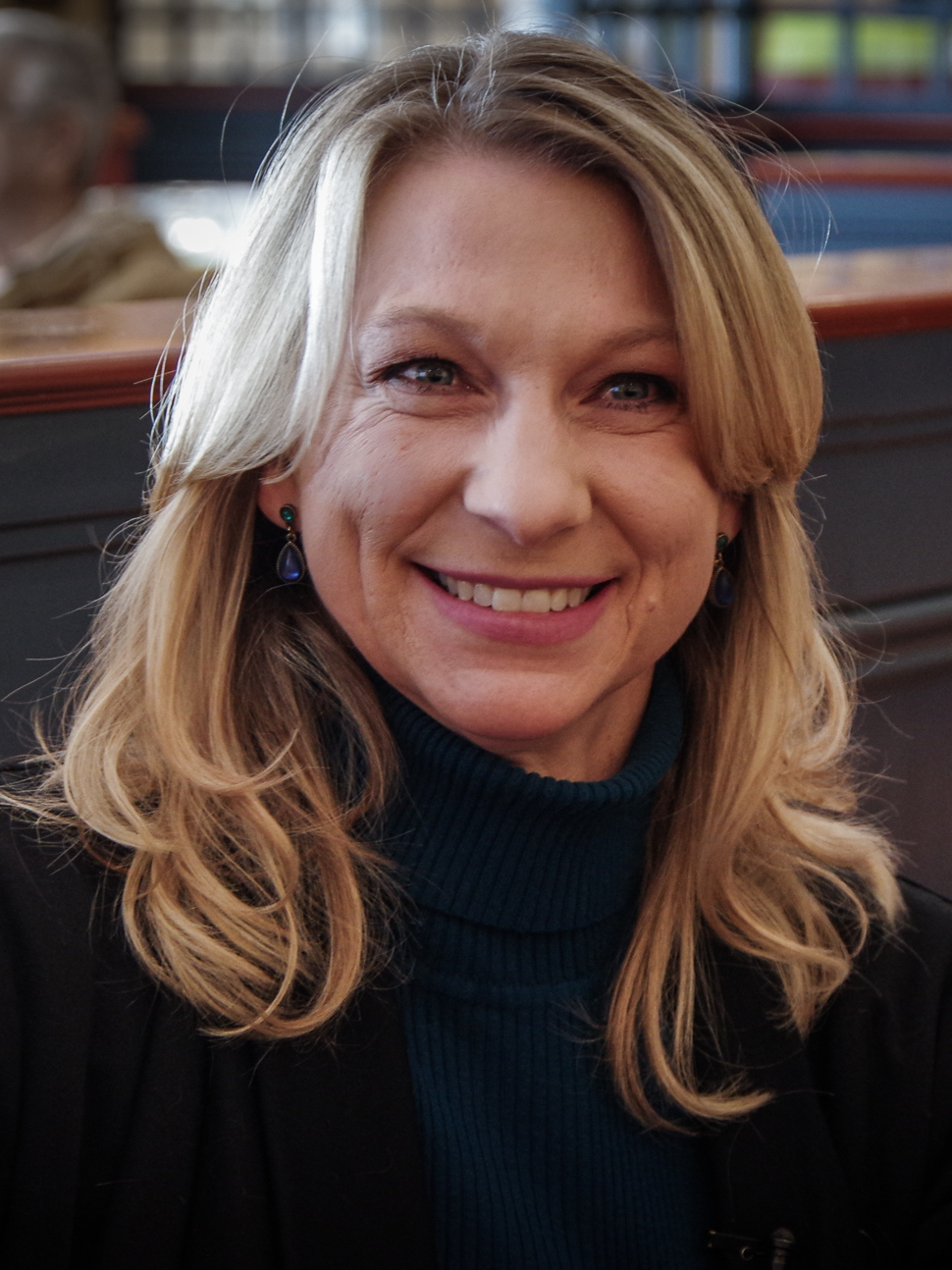
			SM
Candidate	Blaine Hyggen	Bridget Mearns	Stephen Mogdan
Popular vote	11,973	11,465	2,459
Percentage	42.79%	40.97%	8.79%
Mayor before election
Chris Spearman
Elected mayor
Blaine Hyggen

The 2021 Lethbridge municipal election was held Monday, October 18, 2021, to elect a mayor and eight councillors (at-large), the seven Lethbridge School Division trustees, and five of the Holy Spirit Catholic School Division's nine trustees (as Ward 2).

Incumbent mayor Chris Spearman, announced in January 2021 that he would not seek re-election. He served 2 terms as mayor—being first elected in 2013—after having sat for several years on the Holy Spirit school board. Of the 8 incumbent councillors, Rob Miyashiro, Joe Mauro, and Jeff Coffman declined to run for re-election. Four incumbent councillors, Mark Campbell, Jeff Carlson, Belinda Crowson, and Ryan Parker stated they would run again, and another incumbent, Blaine Hyggen, announced he would try for the mayoral vacancy left by Spearman's departure.

During the 2017 municipal election, 21,357 of the 78,772 eligible voters turned in a ballot, a voter turnout of 27%.

== Results ==
Bold indicates elected, and incumbents are marked with an (X).

81,276 eligible voters

28,348 voted

Voter turn-out: 34.88 percent

=== Mayor ===
==== Candidates ====
Candidate	Vote	%
**Blaine Hyggen**	**11,973**	**42.79**
Bridget Mearns	11,465	40.97
Stephen Mogdan	2,459	8.79
Sheldon Joseph Day Chief	1,079	3.86
Gary Klassen	687	2.45
Kolton Menzak	321	1.15

==== Declared ====
- Sheldon Joseph Day Chief, former leader at Blood Tribe
- Blaine Hyggen, incumbent councillor
- Gary Klassen, real estate agent
- Bridget Mearns, former councillor and mayoral candidate
- Kolton Menzak, MMA fighter
- Stephen Mogdan, lawyer

=== Councillors ===
==== Candidates ====
Top eight candidates are elected at large (plurality block voting)

Candidate	Vote	%
**Rajko Dodic**	**12,079**	**7.32**
**Belinda Crowson** (X)	**10,738**	**6.51**
**Jenn Schmidt-Rempel**	**10,463**	**6.34**
**Ryan Parker** (X)	**10,256**	**6.22**
**John Middleton-Hope**	**10,046**	**6.09**
**Mark Campbell** (X)	**9,117**	**5.53**
**Jeff Carlson** (X)	**8,877**	**5.38**
**Nick Paladino**	**7,916**	**4.80**
Ryan Wolfe	7,651	4.64
Bill Ginther	6,289	3.81
Jennifer (Jenn) Prosser	5,872	3.56
Kelti Baird	5,785	3.51
Harold Pereverseff	5,643	3.42
Wally Schenk	5,574	3.38
Darcy Logan	4,883	2.96
Marissa Black	4,839	2.93
Rufa Doria	4,777	2.90
Jerry Firth	4,695	2.85
Ryan Lepko	3,835	2.33
Shelby J. Macleod	3,661	2.22
Suketu Shah	3,636	2.20
Boyd Thomas	3,083	1.87
Zachary Hampton	2,842	1.72
Tim Vanderbeek	2,720	1.65
Dale P. Leier	2,333	1.41
Robin Ryan Walker	1,884	1.14
Davey Wiggers	1,707	1.04
Ben Christensen	1,207	0.73
Bernard (Bernie) Mbonihankuye	850	0.52
Chris Rowley	763	0.46
Bradley Whalen	487	0.30
Michael Petrakis	406	0.25

==== Declared ====
- Kelti Baird, business owner
- Marissa Black, tax professional
- Mark Campbell, incumbent
- Jeff Carlson, incumbent
- Ben Christensen, business owner
- Rufa Doria, immigration consultant
- Bill Ginther, Soup Kitchen executive director
- Dale Leier, retired
- Darcy Logan, not-for-profit administrator
- Shelby MacLeod,
- Bernard Mbonihankuye
- John Middleton-Hope, former police chief
- Nick Paladino, municipal development consultant
- Ryan Parker, incumbent
- Jenn Prosser, not-for-profit administrator
- Chris Rowley, community activist
- Kyle Sargeant, business owner
- Jenn Schmidt-Rempel, business owner
- Suketu Shah, financial advisor
- Tim Vanderbeek,
- Bradley Whalen, business owner
- Davey Wiggers
- Ryan Wolfe, mortgage professional
- Boyd Thomas, not-for-profit director

=== Plebiscite ===
Lethbridge's 2021 municipal election will include two plebiscite questions – one on establishing a ward system and one to construct a third river crossing over the Oldman River.

Question	Yes	No
"Do you support using a ward system to elect City Councillors (other than the Mayor) starting with the 2025 municipal election?"	14,611	11,625
"Do you agree that city council should approve plans to construct a 3rd bridge prior to 2030 as a municipal capital project priority?"	16,463	10,790

== See also ==
- 2021 Alberta municipal elections
- 2021 Calgary municipal election
- 2021 Edmonton municipal election
