= 2017 Lethbridge municipal election =

Local election in Alberta, Canada

← 2013	October 17, 2017	2021 →

Mayor and 8 councillors to Lethbridge City Council
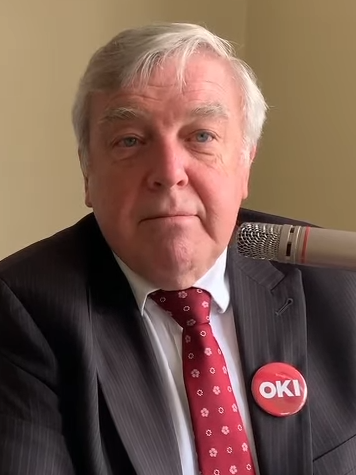
Candidate	Chris Spearman	Martin Heavy Head	Robert Janzen
Popular vote	14,897	3,342	1,969
Percentage	73.72%	16.54%	9.74%
Mayor before election
Chris Spearman
Elected mayor
Chris Spearman

The 2017 Lethbridge municipal election was held Monday, October 17, 2017 to elect a mayor and eight councillors (at-large), the seven Lethbridge School District No. 51 trustees, and five of the Holy Spirit Roman Catholic Separate Regional Division No. 4’s nine trustees (as Ward 2).

From 1968 to 2013, provincial legislation has required every municipality to hold elections every three years. The Legislative Assembly of Alberta passed a bill on December 5, 2012, amending the Local Authorities Election Act. Starting with the 2013 elections, officials are elected for a four-year term, and municipal elections are moved to a four-year cycle. Of the 78,772 eligible voters, only 21,338 turned in a ballot, a voter turnout of 27%.

== Results ==
Bold indicates elected, and incumbents are marked with an (X).

78,772 eligible voters

21,357 voted

Voter turn-out: 27 percent

=== Mayor ===
Mayor
Candidate	Votes	%
**Chris Spearman** (X)	**14,897**	73.72
Martin Heavy Head	3,342	16.54
Robert Janzen	1,969	9.74

=== Councillors ===
The use of Block Voting meant that each voter could cast up to 8 votes. Thus there was a far greater number of votes than voters. 21,000 voters cast 128,000 votes.

(Percentage means candidate received a vote from that portion of voters.)

Councillors
Candidate	Votes	%	Candidate	Votes	%
**Mark Campbell**	**9,522**	**44.6**	Aileen Burke	3,600	16.8
**Joseph Mauro** (X)	**8,891**	**41.6**	Bruce Thurber	3,325	15.5
**Jeff Carlson** (X)	**8,140**	**38.1**	Rena Woss	3,102	14.5
**Ryan Parker** (X)	**7,919**	**37.1**	Zachary Gibb	3,058	14.3
**Blaine Hyggen** (X)	**7,438**	**34.8**	Stephnie Watson	2,638	12.3
**Belinda Crowson**	**7,391**	**34.6**	Bill Ginther	2,270	10.6
**Jeffrey Coffman** (X)	**7,368**	**34.5**	Raymond Hoffarth	2,250	10.5
**Rob Miyashiro** (X)	**7,272**	**34.0**	Craig Burrows-Johnson	2,091	0.9
Liz Iwaskiw (X)	5,680	26.6	John Pogorzelski	1,779	0.8
Nick Paladino	5,668	26.5	Davey Wiggers	1,532	0.7
Jennifer Takahashi	5,264	24.6	Louise Marie Saloff	1,321	0.6
Harold Pereverseff	4,759	22.3	Ross Morrell	1,056	0.4
Joey Shackleford	4,728	22.1	Kevin Mark Layton	994	0.4
David Mikuliak	3,709	17.3	Clint Germsheid	937	0.4
