= 2010 Lethbridge municipal election =

- October 18, 2010

Mayor and 8 aldermen to Lethbridge City Council
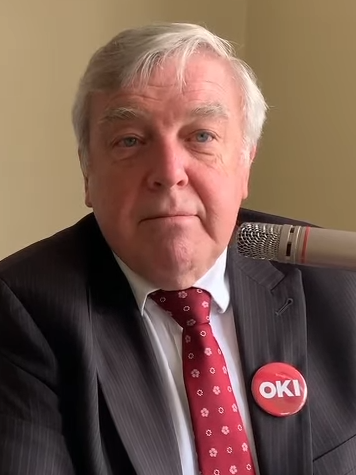
Leader	Rajko Dodic	Chris Spearman
Popular vote	6,170	5,962
Percentage	25.2	24.3
Leader	Cheryl Meheden	James Frey
Popular vote	5,168	4,911
Percentage	21.1	20.0
Mayor before election
Bob Tarleck
Elected mayor
Rajko Dodic

The 2010 Lethbridge municipal election was held Monday, October 18, 2010 to elect a mayor and eight aldermen (at-large), and five of the Holy Spirit Roman Catholic Separate Regional Division No. 4's nine trustees (as Ward 2). The seven Lethbridge School District No. 51 trustees were acclaimed, five being incumbents. Since 1968, provincial legislation has required every municipality to hold triennial elections. Of the 69,863 eligible voters, only 24,522 turned in a ballot, a voter turnout of 35.1%, and an average of 5.9 aldermen per ballot. One seat was not filled at the swearing-in ceremony, as a result of Alderman-elect Bob Babki's death. The seat was filled following a by-election over three months later.

== Results ==
Bold indicates elected, incumbents are italicized, and an asterisk indicates not sworn in.

=== Mayor ===
Mayor
Candidate	Votes	%
**Rajko Dodic**	**6,170**	**25.2**
Chris Spearman	5,962	24.3
Cheryl Meheden	5,168	21.1
James P. Frey	4,911	20.0
Dennis Carrier	1,298	5.3
Kay Adeniyi	667	2.7

=== Aldermen ===
Aldermen
Candidate	Votes	%	Candidate	Votes	%
**Joe Mauro**	**12,962**	**52.9**	Margaret Simmons	3,985	16.3
**Bob Babki***	**11,440**	**46.7**	Geri Hecker	3,728	15.2
**Bridget Mearns**	**8,740**	**35.6**	Melvin James Fletcher	3,667	15.0
**Ryan Parker**	**8,489**	**34.6**	Bev Lanz	3,453	14.1
**Jeff Carlson**	**8,067**	**32.9**	Lee Cutforth	3,257	13.3
**Faron Ellis**	**7,891**	**32.2**	Hazel Hart	2,694	11.0
**Liz Iwaskiw**	**6,963**	**28.4**	Joyce Van Der Lee	2,638	10.8
**Tom Wickersham**	**6,803**	**27.7**	Bob Cooney	2,470	10.1
Jeffrey Coffman	6,590	26.9	Rory Tarant	1,956	8.0
Lea Switzer	6,407	26.1	Fiona Doherty	1,953	8.0
Blaine E. Hyggen	5,867	23.9	Kris Bouchard	1,895	7.7
Bal Boora	5,773	23.5	Kris Jones	1,021	4.2
Shaun Ward	4,706	19.2	Kevin Layton	1,018	4.2
Gary Weikum	4,367	17.8	Bob Janzen	938	3.8
Ken Tratch	4,274	17.4	Rod Hoeg	539	2.2

- **Bob Babki** died before being sworn into office.

=== Public School Trustees ===
Lethbridge School District No. 51
Gary Bartlet	Acclaimed
Brooke Culley	Acclaimed
Mich Forster	Acclaimed
Jan Foster	Acclaimed
Keith Fowler	Acclaimed
Lola Major	Acclaimed
Dennis Wickham	Acclaimed

=== Separate School Trustees ===
Holy Spirit Roman Catholic Separate Regional Division No. 4
Ward 2
Candidate	Votes	%
**Sandra Dufresne**	**3,054**	**50.5**
**Bosco Baptista**	**3,021**	**50.0**
**Danny Ponjavic**	**2,323**	**38.4**
**Bob Spitzig**	**2,218**	**36.7**
**Bryan E. Kranzler**	**1,731**	**28.6**
Clint Germsheid	1,431	23.7

== By-election ==
The 2011 Lethbridge municipal by-election was held Tuesday, February 1, 2011 to elect one aldermen at-large. On October 18, 2010, Bob Babki was elected to the eight alderman council, in the regular scheduled municipal election. He died on October 30, from a suspected heart failure, two days before he would have been sworn into office. Minister of Municipal Affairs Hector Goudreau wrote Mayor Rajko Dodic, and by extension all citizens of Lethbridge, on November 18, that because Alderman-elect Babki was declared elected, a by-election would be required. The Municipal Government Act requires the city to hold a by-election within 90 days of a vacancy, since the vacancy did not occur until the new council was sworn in on November 1, 2010, it would have been January 30, 2011 at the latest, the two day discrepancy was not explained on the City election website. Of the 68,294 eligible voters, only 8,843 turned in a ballot, a voter turnout of 12.9%.

Alderman
Candidate	Votes	%
Jeffrey Coffman	3,304	37.4
Lea Switzer	1,363	15.4
George R. McCrea	1,015	11.5
Bal Boora	944	10.7
Ken Tratch	876	9.9
Blaine Eddy Hyggen	771	8.7
Wade Galloway	237	2.7
Kay Adeniyi	231	2.6
Kevin Layton	72	0.8
Rod J. Hoeg	30	0.3
