= Andy Anderson =

Andy Anderson may refer to:

== Arts and entertainment ==
- Andy Anderson (actor) (born 1947), born in New Zealand, also prominent in Australia
- Andy Anderson (drummer) (1951–2019), drummer for English rock band The Cure
- Andy Anderson (record producer) (born 1969), American record producer
- Andy Anderson (trumpeter) (1905–1982), American jazz trumpeter and bandleader
- Andy Anderson (wrestler) (born 1975), Canadian professional wrestler

== Sports ==
- Andy Anderson (American football) (1924–1993), American football player and coach
- Andy Anderson (baseball) (1922–1982), former professional baseball player
- Andy Anderson (footballer) (born 1953), Scottish footballer
- Andy Anderson (rower) (born 1954), columnist also known as "Dr. Rowing"
- Andy Anderson (skateboarder) (born 1996), Canadian professional skateboarder
- Andy Anderson (umpire) (1925–1994), National League baseball umpire
- Doug Anderson (ice hockey) (1927–1998), Doug "Andy" Anderson, NHL hockey player

== Other ==
- Andy Anderson (general) (1913–2010), Major General in the U.S. Army and seventh mayor of Naples, Florida
- A. C. Anderson (1909–1996), mayor of Lethbridge, Alberta, Canada
- H. S. "Andy" Anderson (1893–1960), woodcarver known for the Scandinavian flat-plane carving style

== See also ==
- Andrew Anderson (disambiguation)
