= 2025 Lethbridge municipal election =

Election in Alberta, Canada

- October 20, 2025

Mayor and 8 councillors to Lethbridge City Council
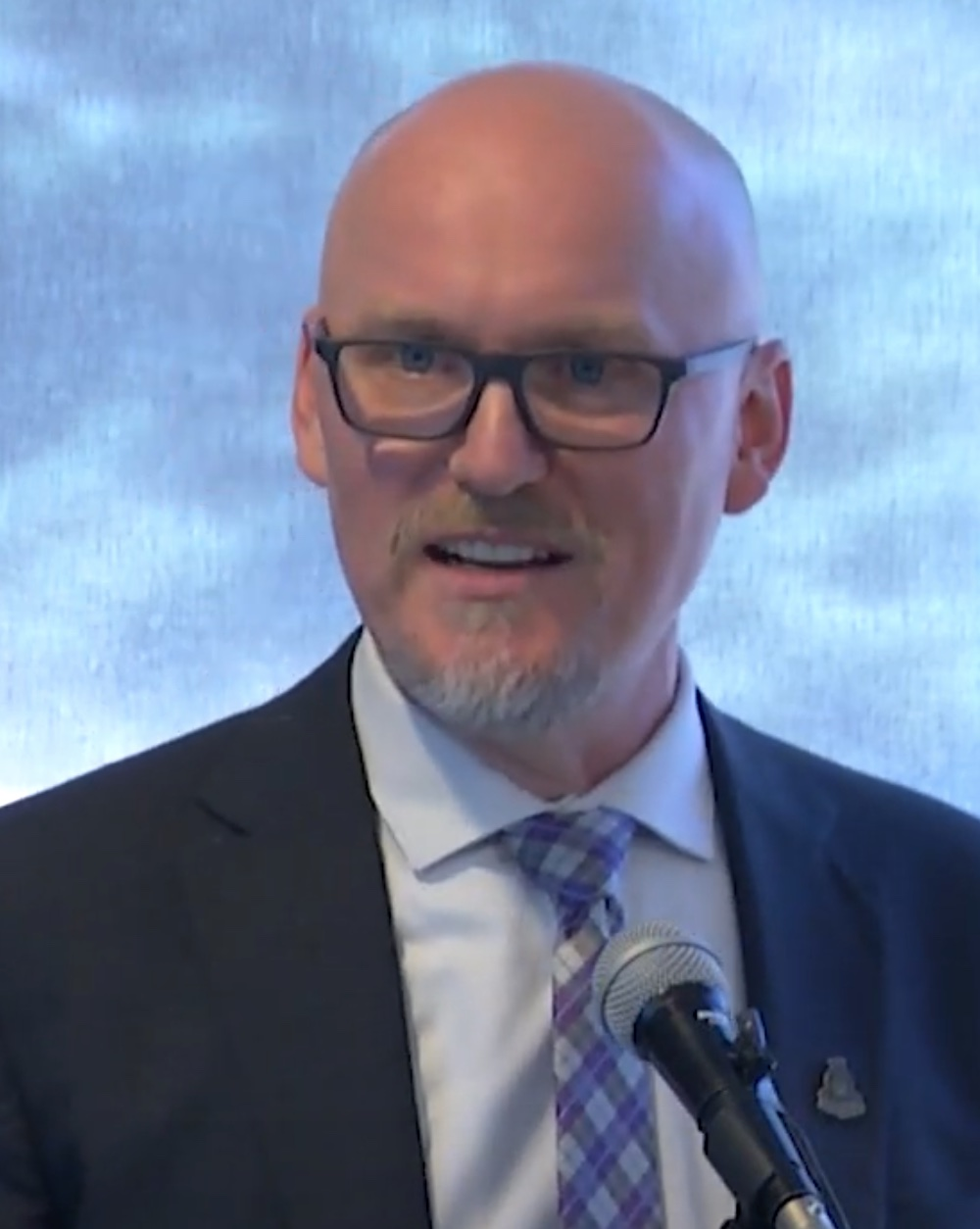

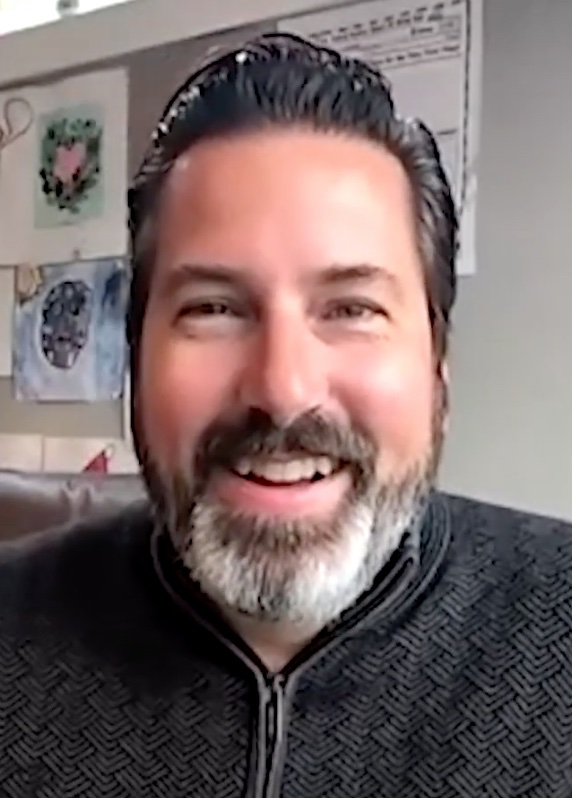
			QC
Candidate	Blaine Hyggen	Ryan Mennie	Quentin Carlson
Popular vote	7,365	6,476	1,810
Percentage	42.95%	37.76%	10.55%
Mayor before election
Blaine Hyggen
Elected mayor
Blaine Hyggen

The 2025 Lethbridge municipal election was held on October 20, 2025, to elect the mayor, eight councillors (at-large), the seven Lethbridge School Division trustees and five of the Holy Spirit Catholic School Division's nine trustees (as Ward 2).

Voting stations were open from October 8 to 11, 15 to 18, and 20.

Mayor Blaine Hyggen, elected in 2021, sought reelection and won a second term.

== Results ==
Bold indicates elected, and incumbents are marked with an (X).

88,647 eligible voters

17,152 voted

Voter turn-out: 19.35%

=== Mayor ===
==== Candidates ====
Candidate	Vote	%
**Blaine E. Hyggen** (X)	**7,365**	**42.95**
Ryan Mennie	6,476	37.76
Quentin Carlson	1,810	10.55
Michael Petrakis	680	3.97

- Quentin Carlson, university student.
- Blaine Hyggen, incumbent Mayor since 2021.
- Ryan Mennie, former city councillor in Campbell River, British Columbia.
- Michael Petrakis

=== Councillors ===
Despite voters having voted for a ward system in a referendum in the 2021 election, Lethbridge City Council voted against pursuing the idea. 18 candidates will contest the race to fill the 8 at-large councillor seats on Lethbridge City Council.

==== Candidates ====
Top eight candidates are elected at large

Candidate	Vote	%
**Belinda Crowson** (X)	**8,508**	**8.86**
**Jenn Schmidt-Rempel** (X)	**7,854**	**8.18**
**Rajko Dodic** (X)	**6,841**	**7.13**
**Ryan Wolfe**	**6,395**	**6.66**
**Al Beeber**	**6,347**	**6.61**
**Rufa Doria**	**6,272**	**6.53**
**Mark Campbell** (X)	**6,203**	**6.46**
**Ryan Parker** (X)	**6,001**	**6.25**
Kelti Baird	5,663	5.90
John Middleton-Hope (X)	5,406	5.63
Mike Schmidtler	5,398	5.62
Tom Roulston	5,038	5.25
Tevi Legge	4,609	4.80
Robin James	4,499	4.69
Kaitte Aurora	3,942	4.11
Gerry Saguin	2,876	3.00
Suketu Shah	1,978	2.06
Margaret (Magie) Matulic	1,955	2.03

== See also ==
- 2025 Alberta municipal elections
- 2025 Calgary municipal election
- 2025 Edmonton municipal election
