= Andrew Anderson =

Andrew Anderson may refer to:

== Politics and law ==
- Andrew Anderson, Lord Anderson (1862–1936), Scottish barrister, judge and Liberal Party politician
- Andrew Anderson (mayor) (1795–1867), American politician, mayor of Nashville, Tennessee
- Andrew Anderson (St. Augustine, Florida) (1839–1924), American politician, mayor of St. Augustine, Florida
- Andrew Anderson (West Virginia politician), American businessman and politician
- A. C. Anderson (Andrew Charles Anderson, 1909–1996), Canadian pharmacist and politician
- Andrew J. Anderson (1837–1916), American politician from Wisconsin
- Andrew Anderson (Australian politician) (1838–1897), Australian politician, member of the Victorian Legislative Assembly

== Sports ==
- Andrew Anderson (baseball) (died 1989), American Negro leagues baseball player
- Andrew Anderson (basketball) (1945–2019), American basketball player
- Andrew Anderson (bowler) (born 1995), American professional bowler
- Andrew Anderson (draughts) (1799–1861), Scottish draughts player
- Andrew Anderson (footballer) (1909–1991), Scottish footballer
- Andrew Anderson (tennis) (born 1983), South African tennis player
- Andrew Anderson (wrestler) (born 1967), American professional wrestler

== Others ==
- Andrew Anderson (journalist), Scottish broadcast journalist
- Andrew Anderson (riverboat skipper) (1895–1958), New Zealand riverboat skipper
- Andrew B. Anderson Jr. (1926–2016), American Air Force general

== See also ==
- Andy Anderson (disambiguation)
- Drew Anderson (disambiguation)
- Andrew Andersons (born 1942), Australian architect
