= Chinook High School (Alberta) =

Location
- 259 Britannia Boulevard West; Lethbridge, Alberta, T1J 4A3; Canada; 49°40′37″N 112°54′32″W

Information
- School type: High school
- Founded: 2010
- School board: Lethbridge School District No. 51
- Principal: Keith van der Meer
- Staff: 58
- Grades: 9–12
- Enrollment: 1085 ▲ (2018-19)
  - Grade 9: 292
  - Grade 10: 271
  - Grade 11: 276
  - Grade 12: 246
- Campus: Suburban
- Colours: Black, red and gold
- Team name: Coyotes
- Communities served: West Lethbridge
- Website: chs.lethsd.ab.ca

Chinook High School is the largest school (by enrollment) operated by Lethbridge School District No. 51. The public high school is one of four in Lethbridge, Alberta, Canada, that serve grades nine through twelve. Completed in 2010, it was the first public high school to open in the city in 50 years; Winston Churchill High School (1960) was the last. It is also the first secondary school to open on the city's west side before Catholic Central High School. Classes began on the afternoon of Monday, August 30, 2010, and a grand opening followed on September 17 at a final, on-budget construction cost of $45.3 million.

The school was built at a 20-hectare (49-acre) site as part of a $94.3 million Community School project which also included a Catholic Central High School West Campus, Crossings Branch Library, and the Crossings Leisure Complex.

The first principal was Clark Bosch, formerly of Winston Churchill High School. A high number of the first staff and athletic directors were formerly of Lethbridge Collegiate Institute,

The school features a 344-seat theatre, with similar amenities to the Genevieve E. Yates Memorial Centre in south Lethbridge, as well as a large gymnasium with arena style lighting.

== Athletics ==
The school is currently in its fourteenth year of operation. Chinook offers a choice of 11 different sports. They include, football, volleyball, basketball, rugby, baseball, curling, track and field, cross country, golf, badminton and slo-pitch. Of these 11 sports, only 9 are ASAA recognized. Baseball and slo-pitch are not recognized because of the inability to play these sports in 5 out of the 8 zones due to the weather.

== Nearby amenities ==
The school neighbourhood includes the Cavendish Farms Centre. The complex contains an ice arena complex; an aquatics centre with water slides, lazy river and whirlpools; a multi-sport field house with fitness centre, indoor track, and gymnasiums; and child a minding area with an indoor playground. Also nearby are a number of nearby leased commercial properties in the neighborhood known as The Crossings.
