= Harry Bentley =

Harry Bentley may refer to:

- Harry Bentley (golfer) (1907–1991), English amateur golfer
- Harry Bentley (jockey) (born 1992), British jockey
- Harry Bentley (footballer) (1891–1970), English footballer
- Harry C. Bentley (1877–1967), founder and namesake of Bentley University
- Harry H. Bentley (1852–1922), Canadian politician
- Harry Bentley (The Jeffersons), television character

== See also ==
- Henry Bentley (disambiguation)
