= 2013 Lethbridge municipal election =

- October 21, 2013

Mayor and 8 councillors to Lethbridge City Council
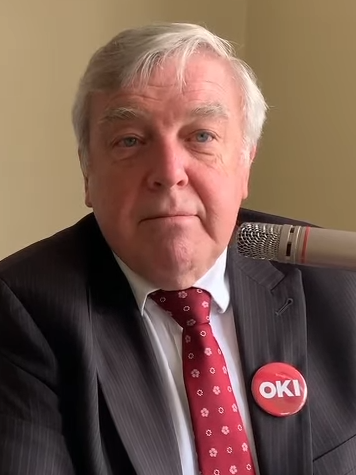

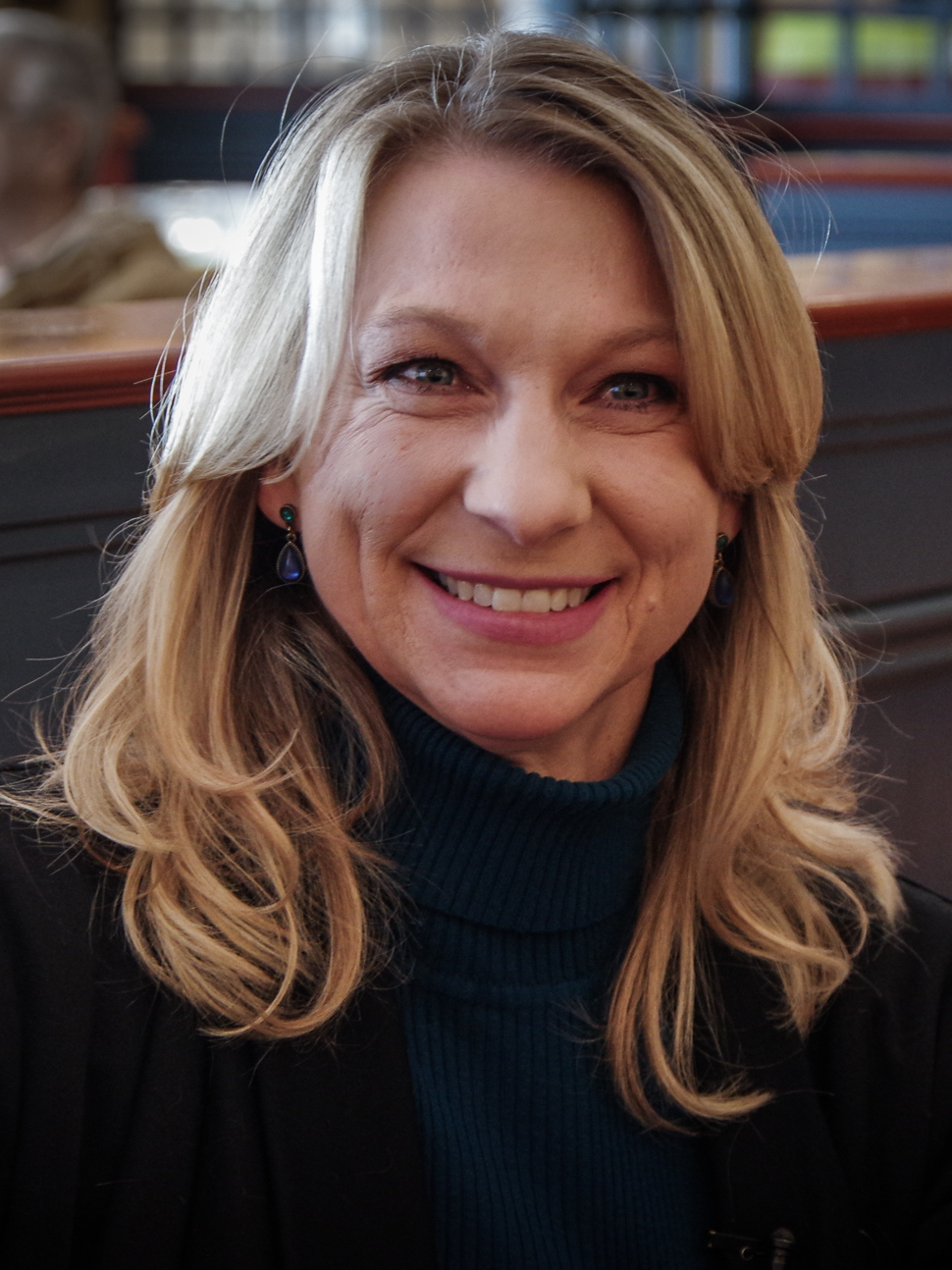
| Candidate | Chris Spearman | Bridget Mearns | Faron Ellis |
| Popular vote | 9,855 | 6,410 | 4,101 |
| Percentage | 46.1 | 30.0 | 19.22 |
Mayor before election
Rajko Dodic
Elected mayor
Chris Spearman

The 2013 Lethbridge municipal election was held Monday, October 21, 2013 to elect a mayor and eight councillors (at-large), the seven Lethbridge School District No. 51 trustees, and five of the Holy Spirit Roman Catholic Separate Regional Division No. 4’s nine trustees (as Ward 2). This election marks a change of title for council members, from "Alderman", to "Councillor".

From 1968 to 2013, provincial legislation has required every municipality to hold elections every three years. The Legislative Assembly of Alberta passed a bill on December 5, 2012, amending the Local Authorities Election Act. Starting with the 2013 elections, officials are elected for a four-year term, and municipal elections are moved to a four-year cycle. Of the 72,912 eligible voters, only 21,726 turned in a ballot, a voter turnout of 29.8%, and an average of 5.66 councillors per ballot.

== Results ==
Bold indicates elected, and incumbents are italicized.

=== Mayor ===
Mayor
| Candidate | Votes | % |
|---|---|---|
| **Chris Spearman** | **9,855** | 46.1 |
| Bridget Mearns | 6,410 | 30.0 |
| Faron Ellis | 4,101 | 19.2 |
| Curtis Simpson | 1,000 | 4.7 |

=== Councillors ===
Councillors
| Candidate | Votes | % | Candidate | Votes | % |
|---|---|---|---|---|---|
| **Joe Mauro** | **11,121** | **51.2** | Kerry Milder | 3,380 | 15.6 |
| **Ryan Parker** | **9,946** | **45.8** | Harold Pereverseff | 3,209 | 14.8 |
| **Jeffrey Coffman** | **9,785** | **45.0** | George R. McCrea | 2,661 | 12.2 |
| **Jeff Carlson** | **9,253** | **42.6** | Darlene McLean | 2,599 | 12.0 |
| **Rob Miyashiro** | **7,265** | **33.4** | Fiona Doherty | 2,143 | 9.9 |
| **Wade Galloway** | **6,922** | **31.9** | Mark Leeb | 2,109 | 9.7 |
| **Blaine Hyggen** | **6,229** | **28.7** | Dillon Hargreaves | 1,787 | 8.2 |
| **Liz Iwaskiw** | **5,942** | **27.3** | Kevin Layton | 1,260 | 5.8 |
| Lea P. Switzer | 5,811 | 26.7 | Rory McKeown | 1,190 | 5.5 |
| Peter Deys | 5,726 | 26.4 | Marco Bergeron | 971 | 4.5 |
| Joey Shackleford | 4,752 | 21.9 | Tyler Gschaid | 780 | 3.6 |
| Jeff Wall | 4,564 | 21.0 | Yves Gauthier | 760 | 3.5 |
| Martin Heavy Head | 4,232 | 19.5 | Mako Tani | 661 | 3.0 |
| Rena Woss | 3,816 | 17.6 | James F. Suge | 335 | 1.5 |
| Michelle Madge | 3,763 | 17.3 | | | |

=== Public School Trustees ===
Lethbridge School District No. 51
| Candidate | Votes | % | Candidate | Votes | % |
|---|---|---|---|---|---|
| **Mich Forster** | **4,392** | **26.7** | Aileen Burke | 1,564 | 9.5 |
| **Janice (Jan) Foster** | **3,957** | **24.0** | Corey Anderson | 1,366 | 8.3 |
| **Lola Major** | **3,826** | **23.2** | Stephen Neis | 1,218 | 7.4 |
| **Keith Fowler** | **3,060** | **18.6** | Lynn Ambedian | 1,124 | 6.8 |
| **Donna Hunt** | **2,949** | **17.9** | Hazel Hart | 1,087 | 6.6 |
| **Don Lacey** | **2,895** | **17.6** | Lorne Darlington | 1,077 | 6.5 |
| **Tyler Demers** | **2,395** | **14.5** | Sherry Hunt | 1,073 | 6.5 |
| David Low | 2,105 | 12.8 | Marlene Applegate (Barratt) | 1,052 | 6.4 |
| Mary Kay | 2,060 | 12.5 | Hailey Solorzano | 805 | 4.9 |
| Nancy Mitchell | 1,777 | 10.8 | Jonathan Ostrom | 639 | 3.9 |
| Brooke Culley | 1,571 | 9.6 | Travis Burndred | 631 | 3.8 |

=== Separate School Trustees ===
Holy Spirit Roman Catholic Separate Regional Division No. 4
Ward 2
| Candidate | Votes | % |
|---|---|---|
| **Ken Tratch** | **2,863** | **54.4** |
| **Garth Renyk** | **2,532** | **48.1** |
| **Danny Ponjavic** | **2,232** | **42.2** |
| **Bob Spitzig** | **1,928** | **36.6** |
| **Bryan E. Kranzler** | **1,493** | **28.4** |
| Clint Germsheid | 1,209 | 23.0 |
