= Frank Sherring =

Canadian politician

Frank Sherring (August 7, 1914 – September 23, 2007) was an auto dealer and politician in Lethbridge, Alberta, Canada. Sherring served as the 21st mayor of Lethbridge from 1962 to 1968, and he was the first mayor to be elected by the general populace rather than by Lethbridge City Council. One of Lethbridge's business parks is named after him.

== History ==
In 1947, Sherring and his wife Violet moved to Lethbridge, then with a population of 16,000. He started work as a gas station attendant before working for a Ford dealership where he eventually became a manager.

Sherring spent much of his time in community service, volunteering for the Jaycees, the Lions, the John Howard Society and the Alberta Amateur Hockey Association. It was this service that made him popular enough to be elected to city council in 1955 and become the most popular alderman in successive elections. When he was elected to the mayor seat in 1962, he was the first mayor to be elected by the people of Lethbridge. Prior to this time, the mayor had been elected by city council.

He played a significant role in creating of Nikka Yuko Japanese Garden, securing land for the University of Lethbridge, and the redevelopment of the city's downtown redevelopment. Under his administration, the Genevieve E. Yates Memorial Centre opened in 1966.

In 1965, Sherring ran in the federal election as a Liberal candidate. He came in third place to Deane Gundlock.

The city honoured Sherring in 2005 when it named a business park after him. The park also includes a large rugby and soccer complex.
