= A. C. Anderson =

Canadian pharmacist and politician

Andrew Charles Anderson, CM (March 28, 1909 – April 23, 1996) was a pharmacist and politician in Lethbridge, Alberta, Canada. Anderson was elected six times as the mayor of Lethbridge, serving from 1968 to 1986. Anderson's 18 years in office made him the longest tenured mayor in the history of the city.

== Biography ==
=== Early years ===
He was born in Shabbona, Illinois. Anderson moved with his family to Champion, Alberta from Illinois in 1912. He graduated from the University of Alberta in 1934 with a pharmaceutical chemist degree. After working for a Lethbridge pharmacy for 14 years, he opened his own business, Anderson's Medical Dental Pharmacy, in 1948.

Anderson was married and the father of a son and a daughter.

=== Political career ===
Andy Anderson was first elected to the Lethbridge School Board in 1950, remaining in that post through a number of re-elections until 1964. In 1964, Anderson won election to the Lethbridge City Council, for which he served until 1968.

Anderson was active in the Lethbridge Chamber of Commerce and was the president of that organization from 1962 to 1963.

In 1968, Anderson was elected to the first of six consecutive terms as mayor of Lethbridge, Alberta.

As a mayor, Anderson's role was pivotal in making the city what it is today. During his term, he oversaw the development of West Lethbridge, the birth of University of Lethbridge, the relocation of the Canadian Pacific Railway railyards downtown, the creation of Crowsnest corridor, and the Urban Parks Project.

Under Anderson's administration Lethbridge invested heavily in sports and recreation facilities, which gave the city the opportunity to emerge as the "Little League Capital of Canada." Anderson was also instrumental in helping to bring the 1975 Canadian Winter Games to Lethbridge and holding a successful event before the eyes of the nation.

When the University of Lethbridge built the $5.8 million Anderson Hall in 2000, they chose to name it after Anderson because of his significant role in the development of the university. He played a significant role in the selection of the university's current location, and he served on both the University Senate and the Board of Governors.

=== Awards and honors ===
In 1963, Andy Anderson was awarded the first annual Bowl of Hygeia by the Alberta College of Pharmacists. The award is given to one of the province's pharmacists in recognition of an outstanding record of community service.

Anderson received the Order of Canada on 30 October 1985.

=== Death and legacy ===
Andy Anderson died 23 April 1996, aged 87.

Anderson Hall, a building on the campus of the University of Lethbridge is named in Mayor Anderson's honor.
