= Southern Alberta Art Gallery =

Southern Alberta Art Gallery Maansiksikaitsitapiitsinikssin
- Location in Lethbridge
- Established: 1976; 50 years ago
- Location: Lethbridge, Alberta, Canada
- Coordinates: 49.6960°N 112.8385°W
- Type: Art Gallery
- Director: Su Ying Strang
- Chairperson: Melissa Arseniuk
- Curator: Adam Whitford
- Website: www.saag.ca

The Southern Alberta Art Gallery Maansiksikaitsitapiitsinikssin (or SAAG) is a contemporary art gallery located in downtown Lethbridge, Alberta, Canada. It has three gallery spaces and a gift shop.

== History ==
In 1974, local residents formed the Southern Alberta Art Gallery Association to lobby Lethbridge City Council to establish a gallery in the Carnegie Library building vacated by the Lethbridge Public Library. The city approved the proposal and provided renovation and operating grants to establish the gallery. Allan McKay was the first director/curator in September 1975, and the first exhibitions opened in 1976.

== Blackfoot Name ==
On October 23, 2020, Elder Bruce Wolf Child and First Nations Education, Language & Cultural Consultant and Elder Mary Fox led the Southern Alberta Art Gallery in a ceremony to receive a Blackfoot Name. The Blackfoot name is Maansiksikaitsitapiitsinikssin.
