= Henry Bentley =

Henry Bentley may refer to:

- Henry Wilbur Bentley (1838–1907), American politician
- Henry Bentley (cricketer) (1782–1857), English cricketer
- Harry H. Bentley (1852–1922), Canadian politician

== See also ==
- Harry Bentley (disambiguation)
