= Chris Spearman =

Canadian politician

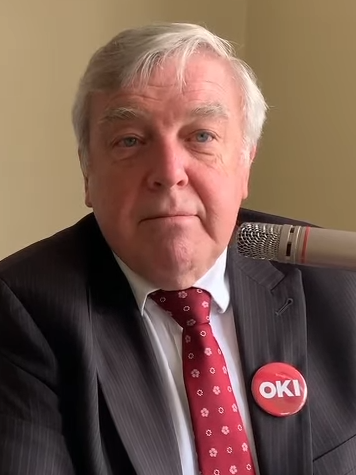
- Spearman in 2020

25th Mayor of Lethbridge
- In office October 28, 2013 – October 25, 2021
- Preceded by: Rajko Dodic
- Succeeded by: Blaine Hyggen

Personal details
- Party: Liberal
- Profession: Businessman

Christopher Spearman is a Canadian politician, who was elected mayor of Lethbridge, Alberta in the 2013 municipal election on October 21, 2013. He was re-elected in the 2017 municipal election on October 16, 2017 with 74% of the popular vote.

A longtime trustee on the city's Roman Catholic school board and a member of the Chamber of Commerce, Spearman finished second to Dodic in the 2010 municipal election. He announced in January 2021 that he would not seek re-election in that year's municipal election.

Leaving office, Spearman spoke with news outlets to highlight accomplishments including the completion of the ATB Centre in West Lethbridge, Legacy Park addition on the city’s north side and the downtown park and ride terminal. He also pushed to institute a residential curbside recycling program in the city in 2019.

On March 23, 2025, Spearman was acclaimed as the Liberal candidate for the riding of Lethbridge in the 2025 Canadian federal election.

== Personal life ==
Spearman is the father of city of Airdrie mayor, Heather Spearman.

== Honours ==
=== National honours ===
- King Charles III Coronation Medal (2025)

=== Foreign honours ===
- Order of the Rising Sun with Gold and Silver Rays (5th Cl. Japan) (2020)

== Electoral record ==
2025 Canadian federal election: Lethbridge
Party	Candidate	Votes	%	±%	Expenditures
Conservative	Rachael Thomas	40,866	61.05	+5.40	$99,574.23
Liberal	Chris Spearman	21,899	32.72	+17.58	$84,698.36
New Democratic	Nathan Svoboda	2,431	3.63	–15.68	$10,506.53
Christian Heritage	Marc Slingerland	806	1.20	+0.24	$14,547.70
People's	Clara Piedalue	478	0.71	–6.24	$1,361.54
Green	Amber Murray	457	0.68	–	$620.19
Total valid votes/expense limit		66,937	99.64	–	$139,973.63
Total rejected ballots		240	0.36	–0.12	
Turnout		67,177	70.34	+5.11	
Eligible voters		95,504			
Conservative hold		Swing		+10.54	
Source: Elections Canada

Mayor, 2017 Lethbridge municipal election
Candidate	Votes	%
Chris Spearman	14,897	73.72
Martin Heavy Head	3,342	16.54
Robert Janzen	1,969	9.74

Mayor, 2013 Lethbridge municipal election
Candidate	Votes	%
Chris Spearman	9,855	46.1
Bridget Mearns	6,410	30.0
Faron Ellis	4,101	19.2
Curtis Simpson	1,000	4.7

Mayor, 2010 Lethbridge municipal election
Candidate	Votes	%
Rajko Dodic	6,170	25.2
Chris Spearman	5,962	24.3
Cheryl Meheden	5,168	21.1
James P. Frey	4,911	20.0
Dennis Carrier	1,298	5.3
Kay Adeniyi	667	2.7
