= Blaine Hyggen =

Canadian politician

His Worship Blaine Hyggen
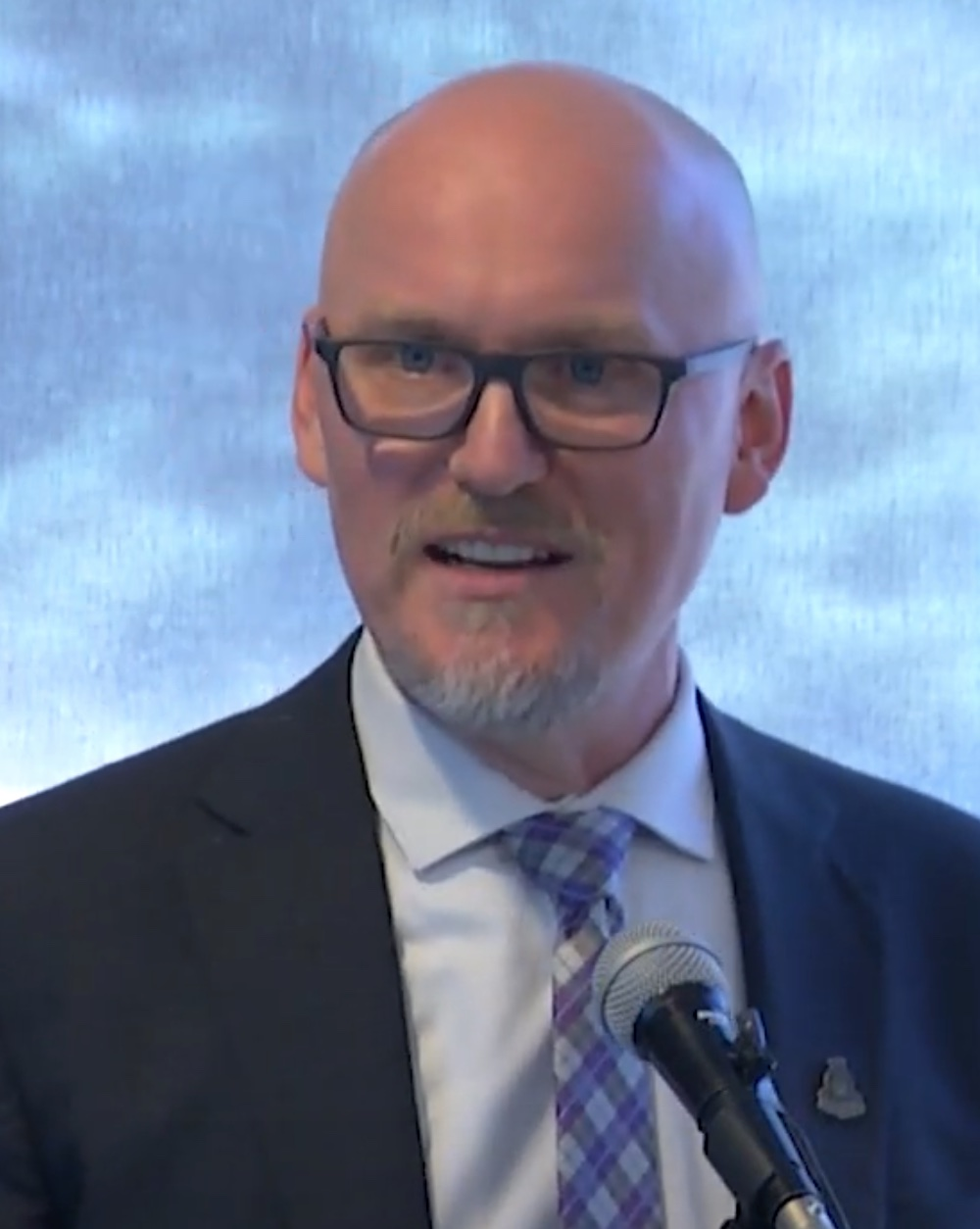
- Hyggen in 2023

26th Mayor of Lethbridge
- Incumbent
- Assumed office October 25, 2021
- Preceded by: Chris Spearman

Lethbridge City Councillor
- In office October 28, 2013 – October 25, 2021

Personal details
- Spouse: Jennifer
- Children: 2
- Profession: Businessperson

Blaine Eddy Hyggen is a Canadian politician. He has served as the mayor of Lethbridge, Alberta, since 2021.

== Early life and education ==
Hyggen is the son of Lola "Dodie" and Larry Hyggen, members of The Church of Jesus Christ of Latter-day Saints.

Hyggen was educated at Lethbridge Community College where he took Business Law and Accounting.

He is the owner of Copy Express.

== City council ==
Hyggen ran for Lethbridge City Council in the 2007 and 2010 municipal elections before finally getting elected in the 2013 Lethbridge municipal election. He was re-elected in the 2017 Lethbridge municipal election. While serving on council, he put forward a successful proposal to rename the Adams Ice Centre to the Logan Boulet Arena after the ice hockey player from the city that was killed in the Humboldt Broncos bus crash. He was less successful when he brought a proposal to call on the provincial government to pull funding for a supervised drug-consumption facility in the city. He stated that he heard that users were being given "goody bags and chocolates", which the mayor rebuked.

== Mayoralty ==
After the city's mayor Chris Spearman announced he would not be running for re-election in the 2021 municipal election, Hyggen announced in June of that year that he was going to run for the city's top job. In his announcement he stated that "I've been a fighter for the people of Lethbridge both fiscally and socially, the kind of guy not afraid to use common sense as a benchmark in decisions." He also stated that as mayor, he would be "fiscally responsible, increase the availability of affordable housing, ensure sustainable development, improve the efficiency of city operations, and come up with a plan to build a third bridge to the west side" and that safety was his number one priority.

On election day, Hyggen was elected as mayor, defeating former councillor and daughter of former MLA Bridget Pastoor, Bridget Mearns by just over 500 votes. After winning election he stated his first priority would be to "reach out to the other members of Lethbridge council" to find out their opinions.

In 2022, he was criticized for a Tweet which shared a link from The Daily Sceptic stating 'There is No Climate Emergency'". He later declared that the article "does not reflect my personal beliefs".

In 2024, he stated that water conservation would be the top priority for the city, due to a lack of snowpack in the nearby mountains which feeds into the city's water system.

In 2024, he and council announced their support for the city to bid on hosting the 2026 Scotties Tournament of Hearts, Canada's national women's curling championship. The city had also unsuccessfully bid for the 2025 Canadian Olympic Curling Trials.

On October 20, 2025 Hyggen was re-elected to a second term as Mayor of Lethbridge, defeating challenger Ryan Mennie by 900 votes and securing 42.95% of the popular vote.
