= Lethbridge Public Library =

Library in Lethbridge, Alberta, Canada

- Type: Public Library system of Lethbridge, Alberta
- Established: 1919
- Branches: 2

Collection
- Items collected: books, e-books, DVDs, Blu-Rays, CDs, video games, phone books, maps, government publications, periodicals, genealogy, local history,

Other information
- Website: Lethbridge Public Library

The Lethbridge Public Library (or LPL, as it is commonly known) is a public library service that is provided by the municipality of Lethbridge, Alberta, Canada. It was established in 1919. While it has had as many as three branches at one time, the library currently has two branches.

The Lethbridge Public Library includes a bookmobile service with a collection of over 16,000 titles, that travels 6 days a week to locations throughout the city and Coalhurst.

The library is a member of the Chinook Arch Regional Library System and The Alberta Library.

== Services ==
- Information and reference services
- Access to full-text databases
- Community information
- Internet access on public computers and Wi-Fi
- Reader's advisory services
- Programs for children, youth and adults
- Delivery to homebound individuals
- Interlibrary loan
- Free downloadable eAudiobooks and eBooks
- Gaming Stations (At The Crossings Branch only)

== History ==
In 1910, several Lethbridge residents wrote letters to the editor and held meetings to express support for the establishment of a library. The following year, the Lethbridge City Council passed a bylaw for provision of a library to be known as the Lethbridge Public Library.

It was not until 1919, however, until the library opened. It first opened in August of the year at the former location of the YMCA at 10 Street and 4 Avenue in the downtown core. The first library board consisted of W. J. Nelson (chair), H. W. Meech, and Rev. C. E. Cragg, and the first librarians were A. N. Filmer, L. McIndoe and Arthur Frayne.

The first building — referred to as the Carnegie Library — created specifically for the library opened on 23 January 1922 at a construction cost of $26,996. It was located in Galt Gardens and consisted of a children's library, adult library, and lecture room. The Southern Alberta Art Gallery currently occupies this building.

After World War II, an increase in patronage to the library resulted a period of growth. In 1951, an extension was built on to the Carnegie Library. Separate branches were built on the northside and southside in 1956 and 1961 respectively.

This expansion culminated with the construction of the building that currently houses the library. This building amalgamated the services from the three previous locations. A 1,858 m^{2} (20,000 sq. ft.) extension was added to this building in 1992.

On August 30, 2010, The Crossings Branch Library opened on the west side of Lethbridge as part of a Community Schools complex between Chinook High School, and Catholic Central High School West Campus.
