= William Oliver (Alberta politician) =

Canadian politician

- Born: December 26, 1860; Oxford County, Canada West
- Died: April 27, 1951 (aged 90); Lethbridge, Alberta, Canada

William Oliver (December 26, 1860 – April 27, 1951) worked in construction in Lethbridge and served as the seventh mayor of Lethbridge, Alberta, Canada. Born in Oxford County, Ontario, Oliver moved to Lethbridge in 1886. Two years later, he married Amelia, with whom he had three sons. After she died in 1912, Oliver married Margaret C. Cossaboom, and had a son with her.

Oliver served as mayor 1902–1905. Under his administration (as well as the mayor before him), Lethbridge secured its first waterworks and sewage disposal system. Outside of his mayoral term, he built houses. He owned Oliver Block and Oliver Apartments.
