= Nikka Yuko Japanese Garden =

Japanese garden in Lethbridge, Canada

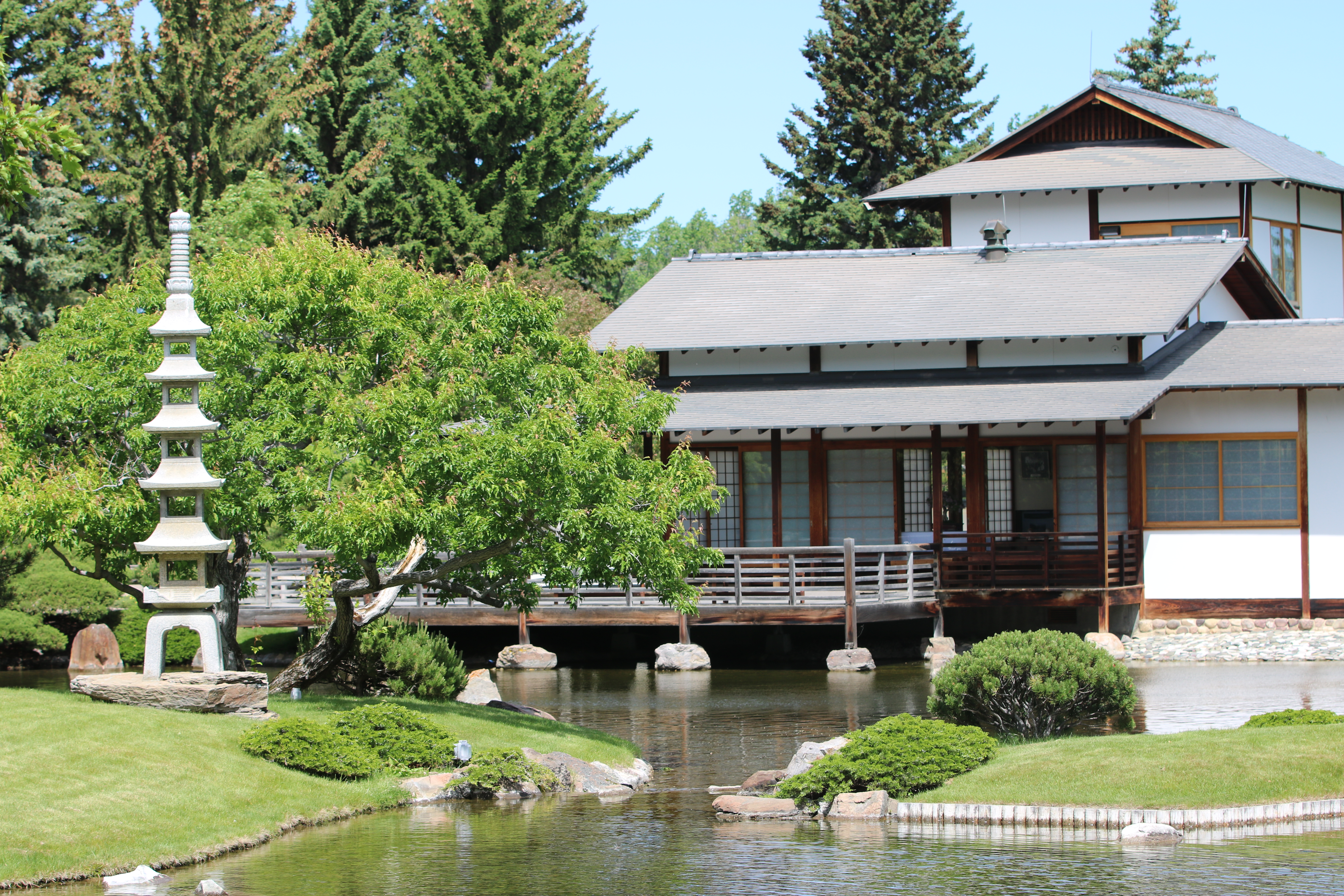

- Location within Lethbridge Location within Alberta Location within Canada
- Type: Japanese garden
- Location: Lethbridge, Alberta, Canada
- Coordinates: 49.68945°N 112.80839°W
- Area: 3.75-acre (15,200 m^{2})
- Established: 1967; 59 years ago
- Visitors: 44,000 (in 2021)
- Status: Open to the public
- Collections: Tsukiyama Strolling Garden; Dry Rock Garden; Tea Garden
- Website: nikkayuko.com

Alberta Historic Resources Act
- Official name: Nikka Yuko Centennial Garden
- Type: Provincial Historic Resource
- Designated: 19 October 2017
- Reference no.: 2359
- Type: Japanese Garden
- Category: Landscape(s) or Landscape Feature(s) Structure
- Designers: Dr. Masami Sugimoto and Dr. Tadashi Kubo

Nikka Yuko Japanese Garden (officially Nikka Yuko Centennial Garden) is a 3.75-acre (15,200 m^{2}) traditional Japanese garden located in Lethbridge, Alberta, Canada.

The garden was designed by Dr. Masami Sugimoto and Dr. Tadashi Kubo of Osaka Prefecture University in Japan. The pavilion, shelter, bridges and gates were all built in Kyoto, Japan by five artisans, who later reassembled them in the garden.

The name Nikka Yuko (日加友好) means Japan-Canada friendship, and was chosen to symbolize the enduring friendship between the two nations and to acknowledge the contributions of Japanese Canadians to Southern Alberta. The garden opened on July 14, 1967, during the Canadian Centennial celebrations.

== History ==
In the early 1960s, Lethbridgian Reverend Yutetsu Kawamura, a minister of Buddhist churches in Alberta, and Cleo Mowers, editor and publisher of the Lethbridge Herald, were independently considering the possibility of a Japanese garden being built in Lethbridge. Kurt Steiner, the manager of the Lethbridge Travel and Convention Bureau, eventually brought the two together and a steering committee was formed. The garden was established during Canada’s Centennial to recognize contributions made by citizens of Japanese ancestry to the multicultural community of Lethbridge and as a symbol of international friendship.

The steering committee, headed by Rev. Kawamura, brought a proposal to the Lethbridge City Council that was subsequently approved on 6 January 1964. The committee proposed a Japanese Garden Committee be appointed to oversee the garden's construction. By the following summer, the committee was granted official society status and later became the Lethbridge & District Japanese Garden Society.

Initially, Dr. Tadashi Kubo, landscape architect from Osaka Prefecture University, provided design expertise, but he later handed the responsibility to his assistant Dr. Masami Sugimoto, who attended the groundbreaking ceremony. He provided consultation on maintenance and improvements presently. The original basis for the design was created by Ayako Hitomi, a student of Dr. Kubo at the time.

After 21 months of construction, the garden publicly opened for the first time on 3 July 1966. The grand opening was held the following year, on 14 July 1967 during Canada's centennial celebrations. Japan's Prince and Princess Takamatsu attended the grand opening celebration.

== Features ==
Core design concepts utilized in the garden include Wabi-sabi, (beauty in age/simplicity), Shakkei, (borrowed view), and Miegakure, (hide and reveal).

Water, (and in the case of a karesansui, its simulated form in sand), comprise some of the major features of Nikka Yuko, as in most Japanese landscape gardens. The garden also features a traditional tea house that hosts cultural demonstrations and private tea ceremonies throughout the year.

Trees used are primarily conifers, with a barrier of evergreens to break the wind and create a perceived separation from the outside world. Many of the plants are pruned in the Niwaki style, exposing the branch structure and emulating trees found in extreme conditions, or ones later in their life cycle.

Stones and rocks are used liberally, either in representation of their natural form, or symbolically to suggest other aspects of a setting such as mountains, waterfalls or islands set in seas or oceans.

Man-made structures such as the Pavilion and Bell Tower also play a significant part in the garden's design, as man made objects are meant to contrast the garden's landscape.

Structures including the bridges, gates, pavilion, and shelter were built in Japan, then shipped to the garden and reassembled on site.

=== Structures ===
- Wishing well, symbolic of freshwater wells used to collect water for Tea ceremonies.
- Pavilion, Sukiya-zukuri style, constructed entirely from Taiwanese Hinoki wood, as opposed to Japanese Hinoki.
  - Chashitsu, or "tea room" with a tatami mat floor, used for Tea Ceremony presentations.
  - Mizuya, or "water room" used for storing utensils required for the Tea Ceremony.
  - Dry-rock garden, inspired by the dry-rock garden at Ryōan-ji temple in Kyoto.
- Azumaya
  - Stone lanterns, purely decorative structures, introduced to Japanese Gardens to provide light for Tea ceremonies held at night.
  - Wooden bridges
- Bell Tower
  - Bonshō Style Bell, created as a symbol of friendship between Japan and Canada.
  - Moon bridge

=== Landscaping ===
- Mountain
- Waterfall
- Streams
- Ponds
- Islands
- Flat "Prairie Garden", with peony wall.

== Governance ==
The Garden is owned by the City of Lethbridge and is operated by the Lethbridge & District Japanese Garden Society through a fee-for-service agreement. The Lethbridge & District Japanese Garden Society, which was established 20 May 1965 is responsible for the management and administration of the garden. Its board of directors consists of volunteers elected for a three-year term. The executive director is hired by the board of directors to oversee the non-horticulture operations of the garden.
