= Cavendish Farms Centre =

Coordinates: 49°40′21″N 112°54′39″W

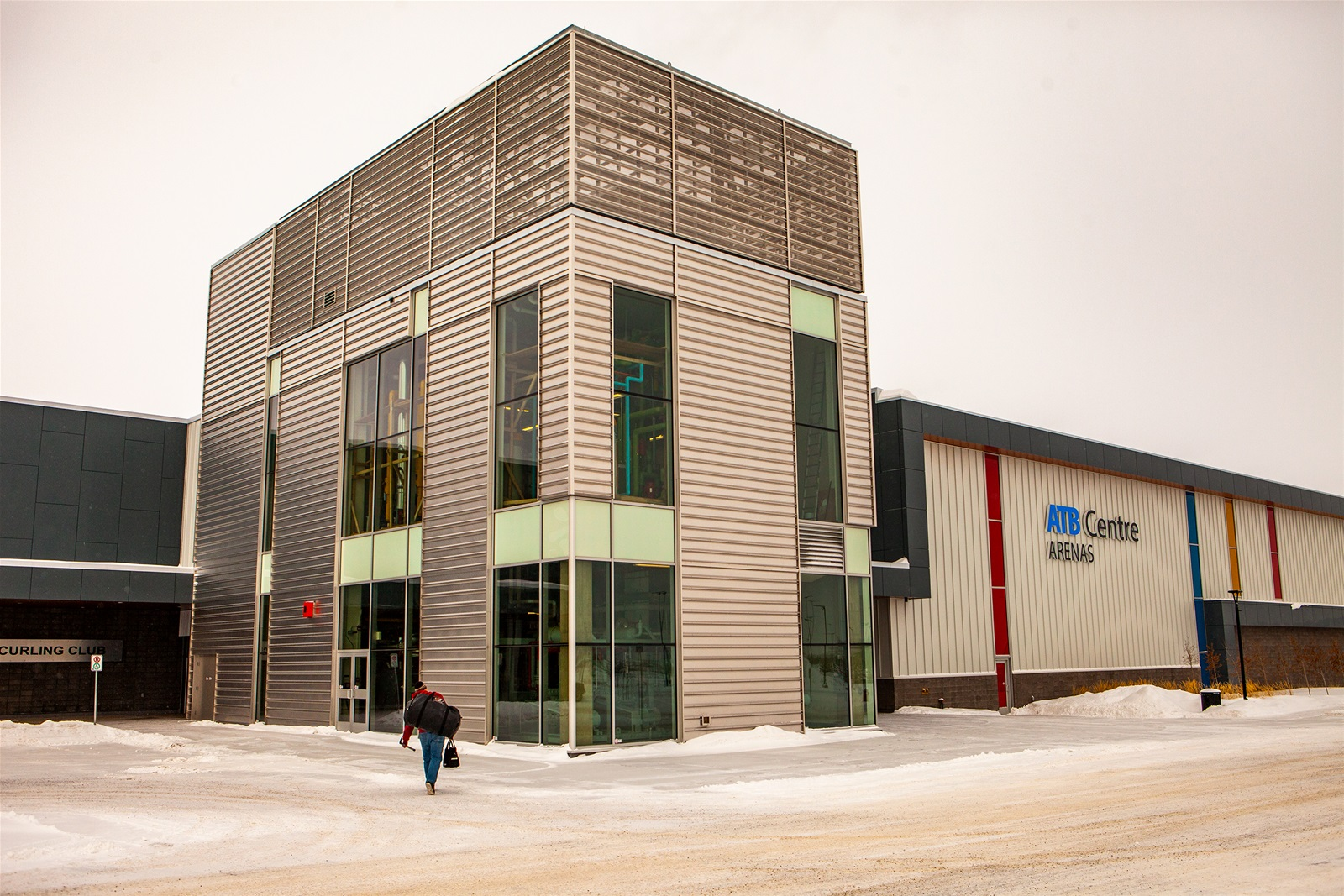
- Interactive map of the Cavendish Farms Centre area
- Former names: Crossings Leisure Complex

General information
- Status: Open
- Location: 74 Mauretania Road West; Lethbridge, Alberta; T1J 5A8
- Cost: $110M
- Owner: City of Lethbridge

Website
- atbcentre.ca

The Cavendish Farms Centre (formerly known as the ATB Centre) is an arena in Lethbridge, Alberta, Canada that was opened to the public on May 4, 2019, after a construction period between 2016 and 2019. It encloses an ice arena complex and the Cor Van Raay YMCA.

The ice arena complex at the centre opened in May 2016, while the YMCA portion underwent construction afterwards.

The Complex is near to the Community School complex consisting of Chinook High School, Crossings Branch Library and Catholic Central High School – West Campus.

Also constructed and undergoing further development are a number of nearby leased commercial spaces known as The Crossings.
