= Andrew Anderson (baseball) =

American baseball player

Andy Anderson

Chattanooga Black Lookouts, Mohawk Giants, Syracuse Black Chiefs
- Catcher
- Died: 1989

Negro leagues debut
- 1927, for the Chattanooga Black Lookouts

Teams
- Chattanooga Black Lookouts (1927), Mohawk Giants, Syracuse Black Chiefs

Career highlights and awards
- Played with Satchel Paige

Andrew "Andy" Anderson (died 1989) was an American professional baseball player in the Negro leagues. He served as a catcher for Satchel Paige in 1927 with the Chattanooga Black Lookouts. Anderson worked as a musician and spent 20 years in the Negro leagues. He played for a number of teams including the Mohawk Giants and Syracuse Black Chiefs. Anderson died in 1989.
