= W. D. L. Hardie =

Canadian politician

William Duncan Livingstone Hardie

13th Mayor of Lethbridge
- In office 1912–1928
- Preceded by: George M. Hatch
- Succeeded by: Robert Barrowman

Personal details
- Born: 9 August 1863 Bathgate, Scotland
- Died: 17 August 1942 (aged 79)
- Spouse: Margaret Jane Kirkley
- Education: University of Glasgow

William Duncan Livingstone Hardie or W. D. L. Hardie (August 9, 1863 – August 17, 1942) was a Canadian politician. He was the 13th mayor of Lethbridge, Alberta, serving from 1912 to 1928. The former hamlet of Hardieville, annexed by the City of Lethbridge in 1978, was named after him.

William Duncan Livingstone Hardie was born on August 9, 1863, in Bathgate, Scotland to William and Agnes (née Livingston) Hardie. His family immigrated to Youngstown, Ohio, in 1863; although, he returned to Scotland to attend Glasgow University. After graduating in 1883 with a degree in civil and mining engineering, he moved to Pennsylvania where he married Margaret Jane Kirkley two years later.

He was hired by the Alberta Railway & Coal Company in 1889 to work as an assistant to mines superintendent William Stafford. He resigned two years later, worked for two years in Mexico and then worked for the Scranton [Pennsylvania] School of Mines. He returned to Lethbridge in 1894 to work as mines superintendent with North Western Coal and Navigation Company. After 16 years, he quit NWCNC to work for the Diamond Coal Company at nearby Diamond City.

In 1912, Hardie quit the Diamond Coal Company to run as mayor, defeating two other candidates. He took office on January 1, 1913. Two years later, a commission form of civic government was instituted, and he became both mayor and commissioner of finance. When the government became a managerial form in 1928 after great support from the electorate, Hardie's term as mayor ended. He worked as assistant superintendent of the Dominion Government Terminal Elevator until he retired. He died in 1942.
