= Andy Anderson (American football) =

American football player and coach (1924–1993)

Biographical details
- Born: April 5, 1924; Kenosha, Wisconsin, U.S.
- Died: May 11, 1993 (aged 69)
- Education: The University of Texas

Playing career
- 1944: Texas
- Position: End

Coaching career (HC unless noted)
- 1948–1949: Wilmot HS (WI)
- 1952–1954: Wilmot HS (WI)
- 1955–1959: Kohler HS (WI)
- 1960–1963: Sheboygan South HS (WI)
- 1964–1966: Lakeland
- 1968–1972: Stevens Point HS (WI)

Head coaching record
- Overall: 9–16 (college)

Leroy Earle "Andy" Anderson (April 5, 1924 – May 11, 1993) was an American football player and coach. He served as the head football coach at Lakeland College—known now as Lakeland University—in Plymouth, Wisconsin from 1964 to 1966, compiling a record of 9–16.

== Playing career ==
Anderson graduated from Wilmot High School where he played football, basketball and baseball and then attended the University of Texas where he played college football in 1944 under head coach Dana X. Bible and with quarterback Bobby Layne.

He also attended Northwestern University and the University of Wisconsin, where he received an MS degree.

== Coaching career ==
Anderson starting coaching at the high school level in 1946 where he compiled a 5-0-1 record at his alma mater, Wilmot High School, winning the conference championship.

in 1948, he moved to Sheboygan Falls High School, where he went 13-2-2 and won 2 league titles over 2 years.

In 1950 his coaching career was interrupted when he joined the Armed Forces and spent 2 years serving in Korea.

He returned to Sheboygan in 1952 and stayed for 3 more seasons before moving to Kohler High School where he coached from 1955 to 1959, winning three Eastern Wisconsin Conference titles. He then coached at Sheboygan South High School from 1960 to 1963 His 1962 team went 8-0-0 and was voted the #1 team in the state while he won Coach of the Year honors. While he was at Kohler he also coached basketball, with a 54-10 record and a 4th place finish in the 1956 state tournament.

In 1964 he was hired as the coach at Lakeland College where he stayed through the 1966 season.

In 1968 he became the coach at Stevens Point High School until 1972.

When his coaching career ended, he had an 89-39-5 record with 7 Conference Championships and two undefeated seasons.

He then became an athletic director and was named Athletic Director of the Year in 1986 and received the Wisconsin Athletic Directors Lifetime Memorial Award in 1987.

== Head coaching record ==
=== College ===
Year	Team	Overall	Conference	Standing	Bowl/playoffs
Lakeland Muskies (Gateway Conference) (1964–1966)
1964	Lakeland	1–7	1–3	4th	
1965	Lakeland	5–3	2–2	3rd	
1966	Lakeland	3–6	1–3	3rd	
Lakeland:		9–16	4–7		
Total:		9–16			
