= Roland B. Anderson =

Roland B. Anderson OBE
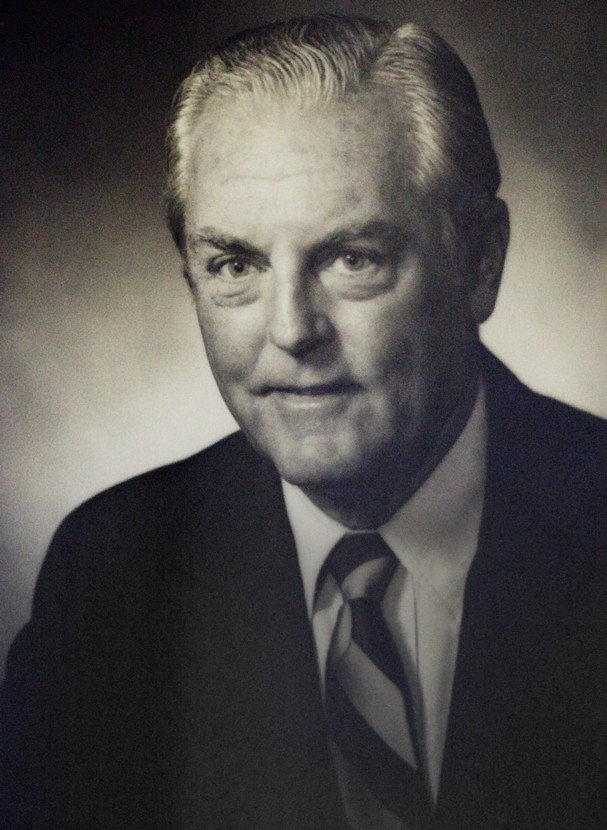
- Official portrait, c. 1978

7th Mayor of Naples, Florida
- In office 1978–1982
- Preceded by: ?
- Succeeded by: ?

Personal details
- Born: October 23, 1913
- Died: December 9, 2010 (aged 97)
- Spouse: Gene Cox Anderson (m. 1944; died 1999)
- Education: United States Military Academy at West Point
- Profession: Military officer

Military service
- Branch/service: United States Army
- Years of service: 1938–1971
- Rank: Major general
- Commands: Co B, 1st Battalion, 8th Cavalry Regiment (Airborne); 13th Corps Support Command (COSCOM)
- Battles/wars: World War II

Roland "Andy" Bennett Anderson OBE (October 23, 1913 – December 9, 2010) was an American retired major general, who served as the 7th mayor of Naples, Florida, from 1978 until 1982.

== Biography ==
=== Military career ===
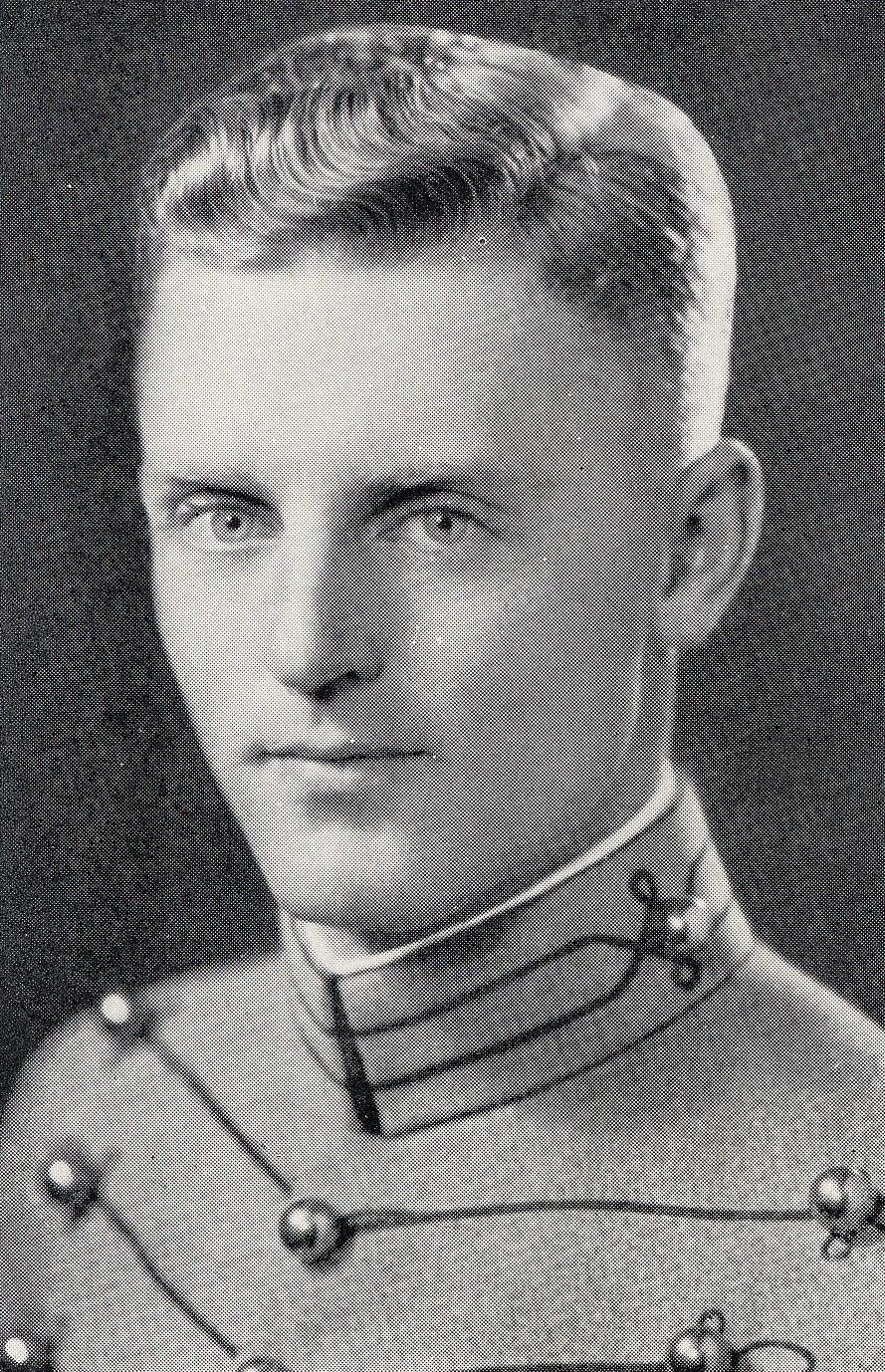
Anderson as a United States Military Academy cadet c. 1938

Anderson was born on October 23, 1913. He initially attended the University of Oklahoma. However, he graduated from the United States Military Academy at West Point in 1938.

He served during World War II as an ordnance staff officer for the U.S. anti-aircraft command in the Pacific theater. Anderson later joined the Pentagon's Chief of Ordnance office following the end of World War II. This included a position in Peru.

Anderson was promoted to Assistant Chief of Staff G-4 for the U.S. Army Logistics Command based in Europe. He oversaw the acquisition and maintenance of all weapons used by the United States Army in Europe at the time. He was further promoted to Director of Army Procuremen upon his return to the United States, a position he held until his retirement from the U.S. Army as a Major General.

He was the recipient of several honors during his career, including the Purple Heart, the Distinguished Service Medal, the Legion of Merit and the Order of British Empire.

=== Political career ===
Anderson moved to Naples, Florida, in 1971 upon his retirement from the U.S. Army. He entered local politics and was elected to both the District School Board of Collier County and Naples City Council. He served as the 7th Mayor of Naples from 1978 until 1982.

Andy Anderson died on December 9, 2010, at the age of 97. He was survived by his girlfriend, Lee Craft; three children - Audrey Joan Anderson, Roland Bruce Anderson and Gene Cristina Anderson; six grandchildren and six great-grandchildren. His wife, Gene Cox Anderson, died in 1999. The couple had been married for fifty-five years.
