= Harry Bentley (footballer) =

English footballer

Personal information
- Full name: Henry Bentley
- Date of birth: 13 August 1891
- Place of birth: Sheffield, England
- Date of death: 1970 (aged 78)
- Place of death: Sheffield, England
- Positions: Full back; half back

Senior career*
Years	Team	Apps	(Gls)
19??–1910	Heeley Friends		
1910–1920	The Wednesday	50	(3)
1920–1922	Brighton & Hove Albion	64	(0)
1922–1924	Swindon Town	10	(1)
- Maltby Main
- * Club domestic league appearances and goals

Henry Bentley (13 August 1891 – 1970) was an English professional footballer who played as a full back or half back in the Football League for The Wednesday, Brighton & Hove Albion and Swindon Town.

== Life and career ==
Bentley was born in Sheffield where he attended Lowfield Council School. He captained the Sheffield Boys football team that faced London Schools in the inaugural English Schools' Football Association (ESFA) championship in 1905, and received a glowing profile the following year in the Yorkshire Telegraph & Star, highlighting his "fine turn of speed" and claiming that "it is not a reckless prophecy to suggest that he will, before many years have elapsed, be appearing in distinguished company, for he has all the attributes of a successful player."

He played for Heeley Friends before joining First Division club The Wednesday in 1910. He eventually made his first appearance for the senior team in April 1914, and took his chance the following season. In November, the Star Green 'Un commented that despite Wednesday's history of sound recruitment, they might not have realised how good Bentley would become. Coming into the side because of injury to the long-serving Tom Brittleton, he retained the right half position even after Brittleton's return to fitness, having "continued to play a very clever, brainy game. He tackles well, and, what's more, makes it his business to place the ball where it will be of advantage to his forwards." He made 34 appearances out of a possible 41 in 1914–15, at the end of which competitive football closed down for the duration of the First World War. Bentley enlisted in the Royal Field Artillery, and was soon promoted to lance corporal. He returned to Wednesday for the first post-war campaign, during which he played in 17 First Division matches.

Bentley then signed for Brighton & Hove Albion, newly admitted to the Football League, and club historian Tim Carder wrote that "his experience was invaluable" to a struggling team. He made 64 appearances over two years, either at full back or wing half, and moved on to another Third Division South club, Swindon Town, for a £350 fee – £100 more than Brighton had paid for his services. He made 11 appearances over the next two seasons, by which time he was well into his thirties. He returned to Yorkshire and played non-league football for Maltby Main.

Bentley died in Sheffield in 1970 at the age of 78.
