= Thomas McNabb =

Canadian politician (1849–1929)

- Born: 1849
- Died: 1929 (aged 79–80)

Thomas McNabb (1849-1929) served as an alderman in Lethbridge, Alberta, Canada and was the city's fourth Mayor. He served as alderman first in 1891, and then again from 1893 to 1898. He served as Mayor from January to December 1894.

McNabb was the past master of a local Masonic Lodge, McNabb came to Lethbridge area in May 1885. For twenty-five years he worked as a master mechanic and a locomotive engineer with the North West Coal and Navigation Company. He was also active in the Old Timers Association and served as president. He died in 1929.
