= West Lethbridge =

Area of Lethbridge, Alberta, Canada

Coordinates: 49.678°N 112.874°W

West Lethbridge (or The Westside) is one of three geographical areas in Lethbridge, Alberta, Canada. It is the newest and the fastest growing. It is the home of the University of Lethbridge and is a residential area primarily.

== History ==
West Lethbridge is geographically isolated by a loop in the Oldman River to the west, south and east. The rest of Lethbridge is across the river to the east. The first bridge across the river opened in November 1890 at a cost of $38,000.

As Lethbridge continued to grow in the middle of the 20th century, the 1969 General Plan recommended westward expansion of the city across the Oldman River. As a result of this recommendation, the Oldman River Regional Planning Commission prepared the report "The Urbanization of West Lethbridge" in 1969. This report proposed West Lethbridge development as a village concept. Each village would include a school, a major park and a commercial centre. Each village was planned to be approximately one square mile in area, contain two neighbourhoods of roughly 6,000 persons each and bounded by arterial roads. This concept still serves as a framework for development in West Lethbridge. The report was prepared for a first phase of development up to 30,000 residents.

By the time the city began including West Lethbridge in its census in 1971, there were fewer than 70 residents. By the following year, 254 residents lived here. This was also the year the University of Lethbridge moved to the Westside.

== Demographics ==
The 2023 municipal census reported West Lethbridge had a population of 43,793. Since the 1970s, the area has seen an average population increase of 18%, not including the years of 1972 and 1976, when it saw increases of 274% and 281% respectively. The bulk of the city's growth since the early 1990s has been on the west side. Its population is younger than North and South Lethbridge, with only 3% over age 65.

== Neighbourhoods ==
- Benton Crossing
- Copperwood
- Country Meadows
- Garry Station
- Heritage Heights
- Indian Battle Heights
- Mountain Heights
- Ridgewood Heights
- Riverstone
- Paradise Canyon
- Sunridge
- Varsity Village
- West Highlands
- The Crossings (In Construction)
- The Piers (Pre-Construction)

== Amenities ==
While primarily a residential area of the city, West Lethbridge still contains many service and retail amenities. Shopping centres include MicMac Plaza, West Village Mall, the regional shopping centre West Lethbridge Towne Centre. The bulk of the commercial development in the 2020s has been focused in the Crossings area, which was designed to be the core service area of West Lethbridge.

The urban park Nicholas Sheran Park is on the Westside as is the Nicholas Sheran Leisure Centre, an aquatic centre and ice arena. In addition to the University of Lethbridge, education services are provided by five public elementary schools, two public middle schools, four Catholic elementary schools, and two high schools (one Catholic and one public). Another major park in Lethbridge is West Highlands Park with amenities such as a lake, walking paths, covered and uncovered patio areas.

The Crossings neighbourhood also houses the Cavendish Farms Centre and the YMCA of Lethbridge.

== Development ==
In 2004, Lethbridge City Council announced plans for the second phase of growth in West Lethbridge, covering a 600 hectare (1,483 acre) area west of Indian Battle Heights and Varsity Village. In 2006, the council voted to put $12 million toward the West Lethbridge Centre. Once complete, the centre should serve as West Lethbridge's hub and consists of two high schools, a branch of the Lethbridge Public Library, parks and fields for softball, soccer and other sports. Additionally, the cities first major leisure centre, the Crossings Leisure Complex, is being constructed. It will consist of two NHL style ice rinks, an Olympic class swimming pool, a waterpark with waterslides and wave pool, 12 curling rinks, an indoor track, and gym. The centre is located in the new The Crossings subdivision.

In November of 2025, $300 Million Dollars was planned for new development in West Lethbridge. There are four major projects in the plan, consisting of residential, commercial, hospitality, and senior living. There is also plan to build the first full-service hotel in West Lethbridge.

== Transportation ==
Transportation in West Lethbridge consists of a major road network. University Drive and Métis Trail are the major arterial roadways in the area. Both of them connect with Whoop-Up Drive, the city's busiest roadway, and Crowsnest Trail, the city's connection to Calgary, British Columbia, and Saskatchewan. Several collector roads connect with University Drive and Métis Trail.

Six bus routes operated by Lethbridge Transit service the Westside, with two of them offering connections to downtown, North Lethbridge and South Lethbridge. Most routes converge at a transit terminal located at the university.
