= Andy Anderson (footballer) =

Scottish footballer

Personal information
- Full name: Andrew Anderson
- Date of birth: 7 August 1953 (age 73)
- Place of birth: Dalmarnock, Scotland
- Position: Central defender

Youth career
- 1968–1971: Partick Thistle
- 1970–1971: → Sighthill Amateurs (loan)

Senior career*
Years	Team	Apps	(Gls)
1971–1982	Partick Thistle	287	(5)
- * Club domestic league appearances and goals

Andrew Anderson (born 7 August 1953) is a Scottish former footballer who played as a central defender; his only club at the professional level was Partick Thistle, where he spent eleven seasons, making 282 appearances for the Jags in all competitions and scoring five goals.

Aside from one season in the second tier, which involved an immediate promotion as 1975–76 Scottish First Division winners, his time at Firhill was spent entirely in the Scottish Premier Division. Anderson was only a teenage reserve when Partick won the Scottish League Cup in 1971, but did claim a Glasgow Cup medal in 1981. He also worked as a driver, both during his playing career and after retiring from senior football (which he did at the age of 28).
