= Harry H. Bentley =

Canadian politician

Harry Bentley (1852–1922) (sometimes written as Henry Bentley) was a politician in Lethbridge, Alberta, Canada. He was the city's second and fifth mayor, serving during 1892–1893 and 1896–1898. His great grandson is former Alberta MLA Jim Dinning. Bentley also served as president of the Lethbridge Chamber of Commerce in 1894 and again during 1896–1898.

Born in Strathroy, Ontario, Bentley married Margaret Lettice West in 1883. They had three children together and moved to Lethbridge in 1885, where he opened a dry good store in 1885 on the main street in Lethbridge. In fact, he was the first merchant in the settlement.

After his predecessor Charles Magrath decided not to seek reelection because of pressure at his company, Bentley—who was then town alderman—was appointed by acclamation as mayor. Most of his term was spent dealing with the local effects of a worldwide economic depression. The North Western Coal and Navigation Company, one of the area's largest employers was hit with closures and layoffs, and town growth practically ceased. at the end of his second term, Bentley saw interest in local settlement increase and the NWCNC's financial performance improve.

Bentley served on the executive committees of the Lethbridge Baseball Club, Lethbridge Lacrosse Club and the Lethbridge Rugby Football Union. He was also chairman of the town's immigration committee. In addition, the land for the first fire hall was purchased from him.
