= Bob Tarleck =

Canadian politician

Robert D. Tarleck

24th Mayor of Lethbridge
- In office October 22, 2001 – October 25, 2010
- Preceded by: David B. Carpenter
- Succeeded by: Rajko Dodic

Lethbridge City Alderman
- In office 1974–1992

Personal details
- Born: July 6, 1941 (age 85) Vancouver, British Columbia, Canada
- Spouse: Angela Cvetco
- Occupation: Public school teacher

Robert D. (Bob) Tarleck (born July 6, 1941) is a Canadian politician who served as the 24th mayor of Lethbridge, Alberta, Canada from 2001 to 2010.

== Biography ==
Tarleck was born July 6, 1941, in Vancouver, British Columbia to Frank Tarleck and Janet Scott Mitchell.

In 1957, Tarleck won the Canadian record for the 100-yard-dash for boys fifteen and under at 10.2 seconds. He was also the Vancouver city champion in the 220-yard-dash, the 440-yard-dash, and the hurdles the same year.

Tarleck holds a Bachelor of Education from Western Washington University. He spent his early career as an educator. From 1965 to 1966, he taught at a junior high school in White Rock, British Columbia. In 1966, he moved to Lethbridge, Alberta where he completed a master's degree. He taught at Picture Butte High School from 1966 to 1969. From 1969 to 1971, he worked as a lecturer at the University of Lethbridge.

Tarleck married Angela Cvetco in 1967. They have two daughters.

== Political career ==
From 1974 to 1992, Tarleck served on the Lethbridge City Council as an alderman. He temporarily retired from municipal politics for nine years until David B. Carpenter announced in 2001 he was not seeking a fifth term as mayor. The opening attracted four other candidates: Mike Pierzchala, Mark Switzer, Greg Weadick and Frank Peta. Tarleck easily defeated runner-up Pierzchala.

Tarleck garnered two-thirds of the votes in the 2004 municipal election against his single opponent and former alderman, Joe Mauro. He was elected by acclamation in the 2007 election. He did not run in 2010.
