= List of mayors of Lethbridge =

Mayor of Lethbridge, Alberta
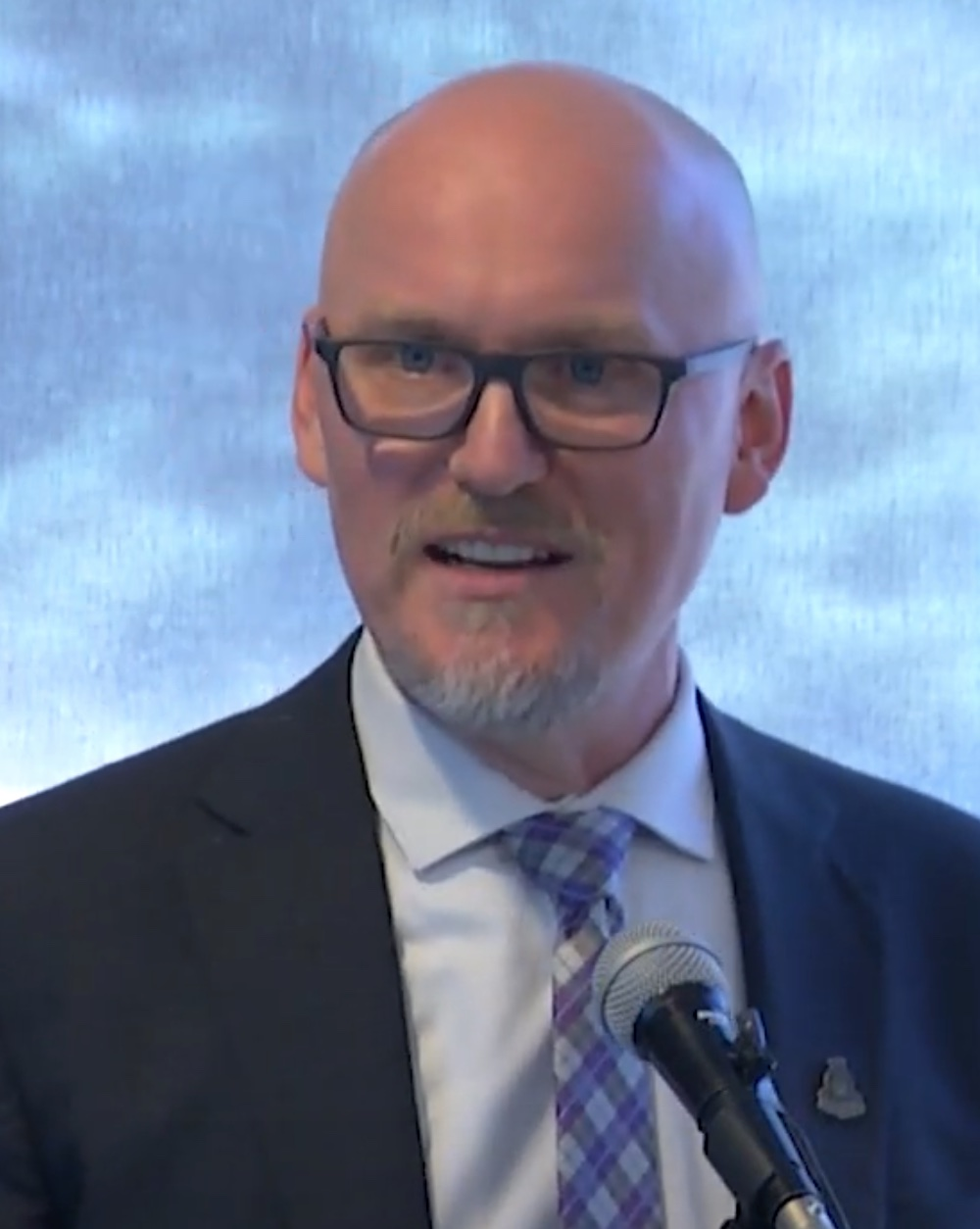
- Incumbent; Blaine Hyggen since October 25, 2021
- Style: Mayor, His/Her Worship
- Member of: City Council
- Appointer: Direct election by residents of Lethbridge
- Term length: 4 years
- Formation: 1891; 135 years ago
- First holder: Charles A. Magrath

This is a list of the Mayors of Lethbridge, Alberta. Currently, elections for the office of mayor take place every four years on the third Monday in October, with the next occurring in 2029.

Mayors of Lethbridge
	Mayor	Term Began	Term Ended	Time in Office	Ref
1	Charles A. Magrath	1891	1891	1 year	
2	Harry Bentley	1892	1893	2 years	
3	Thomas McNabb	1894	1894	1 year	
4	William Colpman	1895	1895	1 year	
2	Harry Bentley (2nd time)	1896	1898	3 years	
5	Frank Hamilton Mewburn	1899	1900	1 year	
6	William Oliver	1901	1904	4 years	
5	Frank Hamilton Mewburn (2nd time)	1905	1905	1 year	
7	George Rogers	1906	1906	1 year	
8	Walter S. Galbraith	1907	1907	1 year	
9	William Henderson	1908	1909	2 years	
10	Elias Adams	1910	1911	2 years	
11	George M. Hatch	1912	1912	1 year	
12	W. D. L. Hardie	1913	1928	15 years	
13	Robert Barrowman	1928	1934	6 years	
14	David Horton Elton	1935	1943	8 years	
15	Alfred W. Shackleford	1944	1946	3 years	
16	John A. Jardine	1947	1949	3 years	
17	Louis Sherman Turcotte	1950	1952	3 years	
15	Alfred W. Shackleford (2nd time)	1953	1955	3 years	
18	T. R. Haig	1955	1957	2 years	
15	Alfred W. Shackleford (3rd time)	1957	1961	5 years	
19	E. C. Lonsdale	1961	1962	1 year	
20	Frank Sherring	1962	1968	6 years	
21	A. C. Anderson	1968	1986	18 years	
22	David B. Carpenter	1986	2001	15 years	
23	Bob Tarleck	October 22, 2001	October 25, 2010	9 years	
24	Rajko Dodic	October 25, 2010	October 28, 2013	3 years	
25	Chris Spearman	October 28, 2013	October 25, 2021	8 years	
26	Blaine Hyggen	October 25, 2021	incumbent	4 years	
