= Lethbridge School District No. 51 =

Public school board in Lethbridge, Alberta

Lethbridge School Division

Location
- 433 15 Street South; Lethbridge, Alberta, Canada Canada
- Coordinates: 49°41′40″N 112°49′10″W

District information
- Superintendent: Mike Nightingale
- Chair of the board: Allison Purcell
- Schools: 24
- Budget: CA 134.855 million (2022/2023)

Students and staff
- Students: 11,957 (approx.)

Other information
- Elected trustees: Allison Purcell, Chair; Christine Light, Vice Chair; Tyler Demers; Genny Steed; Craig Whitehead; Kristina; Andrea Andreachuk
- Website: www.lethsd.ab.ca

Lethbridge School Division is the public school board in Lethbridge, Alberta, Canada.

== Size ==
Lethbridge School Division operates 24 schools covering grades ranging from Pre-Kindergarten to Grade 12.

== Governance ==
A group of seven elected trustees run the Lethbridge School Division. They are elected every three years, in the regular municipal election. In the election, Lethbridge voters can only vote for a trustee to one (not both) of the two major school boards (Lethbridge School Division and the separate Holy Spirit Roman Catholic division). The public and Catholic systems operate independently of each other, and are both under the direct authority of the provincial government of Alberta. The last election was in October 2021.

== List of schools and principals ==
High schools

- Chinook High School (Keith van der Meer)
- Lethbridge Collegiate Institute (Wayne Pallet)
- Winston Churchill High School (Tracy Wong)
- Victoria Park High School (Cayley King)
- Immanuel Christian High School (Matthew Bekkering)

Middle schools

- Gilbert Paterson Middle School (Morgan Day)
- G.S. Lakie Middle School (Brad Dersch)
- Lethbridge Christian School (Sean Alaric)
- Senator Joyce Fairbairn Middle School (Craig DeJong)
- Wilson Middle School (Dean Hawkins)

Elementary schools

- Coalbanks Elementary School (Joey Gentile)
- Dr. Gerald B. Probe Elementary School (Keith VanDerMeer)
- École Agnes Davidson Elementary School (Terra Leggat)
- Fleetwood Bawden Elementary School (Kathy Mundell)
- Galbraith Elementary School (Sandy Scheldrup)
- General Stewart Elementary School (Chris Harris)
- Lakeview Elementary School (Connie Adserballe)
- Lethbridge Christian School (Sean Alaric)
- Mike Mountain Horse Elementary School (Kerry Taylor)
- Nicholas Sheran Community School (Aaron Fitchett)
- Park Meadows Elementary School (Teri Smith)
- Senator Buchanan Elementary School (Lenee Fyfe)
- Westminster Elementary School (Jeni Halowski)
- Immanuel Christian Elementary School (Barbi Wall)

== See also ==
- List of Alberta school boards
- Schools in Alberta
- Holy Spirit Roman Catholic Separate Regional Division No. 4
