= Holy Spirit Roman Catholic Separate Regional Division No. 4 =

School district in Alberta, Canada

Holy Spirit Roman Catholic Separate School Division

Location
- 620 12th Street B North; Lethbridge, Alberta, Canada Canada
- Coordinates: 49°42′30″N 112°49′38″W

District information
- Superintendent: Chantel Axani
- Chair of the board: Linda Ellefson
- Schools: 16
- Budget: CA$74.2 million (2025/2026)

Students and staff
- Students: 5,491 (September 2024)
- Teachers: 282.46 FTE (2024/2025)
- Staff: 250.79 FTE (2024/2025)
- Student–teacher ratio: 19.44:1 (2024/2025)

Other information
- Elected trustees: Kevin Kinahan, ward 1 Tricia Doherty, ward 2 Linda Ellefson, ward 2 Roisin Gibb, ward 2 Carmen Mombourquette, ward 2 Bob Spitzig, ward 2 Cheralan O'Donnell, ward 3 Blake Dolan, ward 4 Thomas Machacek, ward 5
- Website: www.holyspirit.ab.ca

Holy Spirit Roman Catholic Separate School Division or Holy Spirit Catholic School Division is the Catholic school authority in Lethbridge, Alberta, Canada and surrounding communities.

== Size ==
The Holy Spirit Roman Catholic Separate School Division runs 16 schools in the communities of Lethbridge, Taber, Coaldale, Picture Butte, Bow Island and Pincher Creek in southwestern Alberta. The school board enrolment for 2024/25 was 5,491 students.

== Governance ==
A Board of Trustees, composed of nine elected trustees, runs the Holy Spirit Catholic School Dvision. The trustees are elected from five different wards across the area covered by the school division. The five wards are:

- Ward 1 (Coaldale, Broxburn, Fairview, Tempest, and area): 1 trustee
- Ward 2 (Lethbridge, Coalhurst, Craddock, Raymond, Stirling, and area): 5 trustees, elected at large
- Ward 3 (Picture Butte, Diamond City, Iron Springs, Shaughnessy, Turin, and area): 1 trustee
- Ward 4 (Pincher Creek, Drywood, Summer View, Twin Butte, and area): 1 trustee
- Ward 5 (Taber, Bow Island, Barnwell, Chin, Cranford, Conrad, Elcan, Fincastle, Purple Springs, Reliance, Wrentham, and area): 1 trustee

The trustees are elected every four years under the provisions of the Local Authorities Elections Act of the Province of Alberta. The last election was in October, 2021.

At an annual organizational meeting, the Board of Trustees elects one of its members to be Chair of the Board and another to be Vice Chair.

== Schools ==
In 2025/26, the Holy Spirit Catholic School division operated the following 16 schools:

Bow Island

- St. Michael's School (Early Learning-12)

Coaldale

- St. Joseph's School (Early Learning-9)

Lethbridge

- Catholic Central High School (10-12)
- Children of St. Martha School (Early Learning-6)
- École St. Mary School (Early Learning-6)
- Father Leonard Van Tighem School (Early Learning-6)
- Our Lady of the Assumption School (Early Learning-6)
- St. Francis Junior High (7-9)
- St. Patrick Fine Arts School (K-6)
- St. Paul School (Early Learning-6)
- St. Theresa of Calcutta (Early Learning-6)

Picture Butte

- St. Catherine School (Early Learning-9)

Pincher Creek

- St. Michael's School (Early Learning-6)

Taber

- St. Mary School (6-12)
- St. Patrick School (Early Learning-5)

Alternative Learning School

- Trinity Learning Centre (10-12)

In September 2026, the Holy Spirit Catholic School Division will open a new K-6 school in West Lethbridge with a capacity of 250 students and the ability to accommodate up to 400, when fully built out. Upon the opening of this new elementary school, Father Leonard Van Tighem School will become a junior high school (grades 7-9).
