= Lethbridge City Council =

Legislative governing body in Alberta, Canada

Type
- Type: City Council

History
- Founded: May 9, 1906; 120 years ago (City); December 3, 1890; 135 years ago (Town)
- New session started: October 27, 2025

Leadership
- Mayor of Lethbridge: Blaine Hyggen since October 25, 2021

Structure
- Seats: 9 (Mayor + 8 Councillors)
- Political groups: Non-partisan
- Committees: Boards, Commissions and Committees
- Length of term: 4 years

Elections
- Voting system: FPTP (mayor); Plurality block voting (councillors)
- Last election: October 20, 2025
- Next election: October 22, 2029

Motto
- Ad occasionis januam (Latin for "Gateway to Opportunity")

Meeting place
- Council Chambers; Lethbridge City Hall; 910 4th Avenue South

Website
- www.lethbridge.ca

Lethbridge City Council is the legislative governing body that represents the citizens of Lethbridge, Alberta. The council is composed of the mayor and eight councillors. The mayor is the city's chief elected official and the city manager is its chief administrative officer.

== Council Members ==
The current council was elected at the 2025 election:

- Blaine Hyggen, mayor
- Al Beeber, councillor
- Mark Campbell, councillor
- Belinda Crowson, councillor
- Rajko Dodic, councillor
- Rufa Doria, councillor
- Ryan Parker, councillor
- Jenn Schmidt-Rempel, councillor
- Ryan Wolfe, councillor

== History ==
In 1890, when the local population reached 1,478, an application was made to the Legislative Assembly of the Northwest Territories to grant town incorporation. Such was granted on 3 December of that year and the following 9 February, the first town council meeting was held in the Lethbridge Hotel. Charles Alexander Magrath was the first mayor and was joined by six aldermen.

Shortly after Alberta became a province in 1905, an application was made for a city charter. City status was granted on 9 May 1906, and the first council meeting was held on 21 May with a mayor and six aldermen as before.

The Alberta Legislature approved a new charter on 25 March 1913 that would see the city governed by three elected commissioners: the mayor, who was also commissioner of finance; a commissioner of public utilities and a commissioner of public works. The charter became effective 1 January 1914 and the first meeting under this commission was held on 5 January 1914 under mayor William Duncan Livingston Hardie.

Within eight years, however, local citizens felt the commission was becoming dictatorial and were able to get the charter amended to allow for three additional but advisory commissioners. The newly elected commissioners attended their first meeting on 24 April 1922.

In 1928, Lethbridgians voted in a plebiscite to change their civic government from commission board scheme to council–manager form. The council was to be composed of seven aldermen, one of whom would be elected internally as mayor. As well, a city manager was to be appointed by city council to administer its policies. The new elections were held in June 1928, with city councillors elected through Single transferable voting (STV). They were to serve staggered terms. In their first meeting, on 23 July 1928, council elected Robert Barrowman as mayor.

Disillusionment with STV led to a referendum being held in December 1928, where a majority voted in favour of cancelling STV.

Thereafter the city has elected its city council through Block Voting, at-large with no wards. Block Voting means there are a far greater number of votes than the number of voters. In 2017, 21,000 voters cast 128,000 votes.

In 1961, city electors voted in favour of electing their mayor directly. In 1962, city voters elected Frank Sherring as mayor. Seven years later, the number of aldermen was increased from six to eight, the number it still has today.

Lethbridge City Council voted unanimously to adopt the gender-neutral term Councillor for its elected members on March 5, 2012. The move came after advocacy from various public interest groups in the community, as Lethbridge was one of the last city councils in Alberta to still use the term Alderman.

After changes to provincial legislation, the term length for municipal councils in Alberta was increased from 3 years to 4 years, beginning with the 2013 election.

== Elections ==
Every four years, the City of Lethbridge holds municipal elections for the positions of councillor and mayor. All councillors are elected at large.

The tables below show all candidates who ran in recent elections, bold indicates elected, and incumbents are italicized.

=== 2025 election ===
The 2025 elections were held on October 20, 2025, to elect a mayor and 8 councillors.

=== 2021 election ===
The 2021 elections were held on October 18, 2021, to elect a mayor and 8 councillors. The election also included two plebiscite questions – one on establishing a ward system and one to construct a third river crossing over the Oldman River.

=== 2017 election ===
In the 2017 elections, the mayor was elected from 3 candidates, and 8 councillors from 28 candidates.

=== 2013 election ===
In the 2013 elections, the mayor was elected from 4 candidates, and 8 councillors from 29 candidates.

=== 2010 election ===
In the 2010 elections, the mayor was elected from 6 candidates, and 8 aldermen from 30 candidates. However, one alderman-elect died before being sworn in. The vacancy was filled in a 2011 by-election, by the 2010 runner-up, amongst ten candidates.

=== 2007 election ===
In the 2007 elections, the incumbent mayor was acclaimed, and eight aldermen were elected from 16 candidates.

=== 2004 election ===
The 2004 election was held October 18, 2004.

Mayor
Name	Votes	Percent
MAURO, Joe	7,732	33.52
**TARLECK, Bob**	15,333	66.48

Aldermen
Name	Votes	Percent
BOORA, Bal	5,915	4.41
CHAPMAN, Ken	2,865	2.14
CONNERS, James	1,885	1.41
DALKE, Don	4,733	3.53
**DODIC, Rajko**	7,771	5.79
FENGSTAD, Glen M.	3,421	2.55
FERGUSON, Lesley	2,673	1.99
FRANCIS, Cary	983	0.73
GIRDWOOD, Sue	2,250	1.68
**IWASKIW, Liz**	8,343	6.22
JANZEN, Bob	1,572	1.17
KURINA, Frank	1,811	1.35
**LACEY, Barbara**	11,313	8.43
LARSEN, Adam	4,011	2.99
LeBARON, D.L. "Rick"	4,874	3.63
McMULLEN, Jim	4,064	3.03
**PARKER, Ryan**	14,357	10.70
PAULHUS, Romeo	3,834	2.86
ROEDLER, Chris	896	0.67
SIMMONS, Margaret	4,483	3.34
SINGER, Chris	1,253	0.93
TYSLAU, Ron	2,833	2.11
**VAALA, Leslie**	9,141	6.81
**WARD, Shaun**	9,815	7.32
**WEADICK, Joanne**	6,478	4.83
**WICKERSHAM, Tom**	12,570	9.37

=== 2001 election ===
The 2001 election was held October 15, 2001.

Mayor
Name	Votes	Percent
PETA, Frank	2,244	9.5
PIERZCHALA, Mike	5,939	25.0
SWITZER, Mark H.	3,181	13.4
**TARLECK, Bob**	9,459	39.9
WEADICK, Greg	2,907	12.3

Aldermen
Name	Votes	Percent
BOLEN, John	881	0.6
BOORA, Bal	3,683	2.7
CAMPBELL, Sandra L.	2,667	1.9
CHAPMAN, Ken	1,466	1.1
DARLINGTON, Lorne James	2,674	1.9
DEMERS, Tyler D.	5,044	3.7
DENNIS, Terry	1,159	0.8
ELLIOTT, Bev	4,069	3.0
FENGSTAD, Glen	2,289	1.7
FLYNN, G.E. Kelly	1,316	1.0
FORSYTH, Howard	1,966	1.4
FUDRA, Frank	2,123	1.5
GIBSON, Bill	4,696	3.4
**HEATHERINGTON, Dar**	5,701	4.1
ISFELD, Jason	675	0.5
KENT, Adrian	776	0.6
KOBAL, John	3,397	2.5
**LACEY, Barbara Ann**	8,515	6.2
LEBLANC (WEBBER), Bev	2,371	1.7
LEES, Keith	2,374	1.7
McCOLL, Aaron	800	0.6
McMULLEN, Jim	2,436	1.8
**MAURO, Joe**	15,330	11.1
MOLCAK, Jack	2,449	1.8
NAKAHAMA, Ken	4,280	3.1
NEUFELD, Randy	5,426	3.9
**PARKER, Ryan**	11,065	8.0
**PASTOOR, Bridget A.**	5,722	4.2
ROSS, Rick	3,517	2.6
SIEVER, Kim	946	0.7
**VAALA, Leslie**	6,156	4.5
WALDERN, Gerald, D.R.	1,976	1.4
**WARD, Shaun**	7,905	5.7
WHITE, David	2,170	1.6
**WICKERSHAM, Tom**	9,579	7.0

=== 1998 election ===
The 1998 election was held October 26, 1998.

Mayor
Name	Votes	Percent
**CARPENTER, David B.**	13,479	57.2
OXLEY, Jon	6,531	27.7
STEPHENSON, Mark D.	3,553	15.1

Aldermen
Name	Votes	Percent
BAIN, Ron	6,811	4.9
COFFMAN, Jeffrey A.	8,927	6.4
DADSWELL, Al	6,709	4.8
FENGSTAD, Glen	4,616	3.3
FOSTER, Janice (Jan)	8,593	6.2
**LACEY, Barbara**	12,913	9.3
LAMDEN, Dan	2,105	1.5
LOUGH, Victor	5,426	3.9
**MARTIN, Ed**	9,541	6.8
**MAURO, Joe**	11,143	8.0
**PARKER, Ryan**	11,741	8.4
**PASTOOR, Bridget A.**	9,208	6.6
**PETA, Frank**	10,091	7.2
TOMPKINS, Michele	7,833	5.6
**WARD, Shaun**	11,503	8.2
**WEADICK, Greg**	12,362	8.9
