= Harm reduction in the United States =

Reduce harm without reducing drug use

Harm reduction consists of a series of strategies aimed at reducing the negative impacts of drug use on users. It has been described as an alternative to the U.S.'s moral model and disease model of drug use and addiction. While the moral model treats drug use as a morally wrong action and the disease model treats it as a biological or genetic disease needing medical intervention, harm reduction takes a public health approach with a basis in pragmatism. Harm reduction provides an alternative to complete abstinence as a method for preventing and mitigating the negative consequences of drug use and addiction.

== Types of harm reduction in the U.S. ==
=== Drug testing and drug checking ===
Drug checking describes the processes by which a user may test a substance for the presence of a variety of drugs to determine what drugs the substance contains before consumption or processes through which persons using harm reduction drug checking services can access detailed information on the substances they have or will use. One common form of drug testing are fentanyl, xylazine, and medetomidine test strips. Test strips are an affordable product available as small paper strips that can detect the presence of fentanyl. Drug checking is expanding across the United States, with community programs operating in multiple states. Beyond fentanyl detection, drug checking programs have demonstrated their value in identifying emergence substances in the illicit drug supply and the role drug checking have on public health action. The Centers for Disease Control and Prevention (CDC) determined synthetic opioids, like fentanyl, to be the main culprit in increased U.S. opioid-related deaths. In 2017, 38.9% of drug overdose deaths in the U.S. involved fentanyl. According to the CDC, the "12-month count of synthetic opioid deaths increased 38.4% from the 12-months ending in June 2019 compared with the 12-months ending in May 2020."

==== Legality ====
In April 2021, the CDC and the Substance Abuse and Mental Health Services Administration (SAMHSA) announced that federal funding can be used in the purchase of rapid FTS.

=== Syringe service program ===
Syringe exchange programs (SEPs), syringe services programs (SSPs), or needle exchange programs (NEPs), involve the implementation of safe used syringe disposal as well as access to clean syringes.

Intravenous drug use places the user at an increased risk of contracting human immunodeficiency virus (HIV) as well as hepatitis C virus (HCV). According to the CDC, HIV can survive on a syringe for up to 42 days, which means that an HIV-negative individual who uses a syringe can potentially contract the virus weeks after it was used by an HIV-positive individual. Sharing syringes is the second biggest risk factor for contracting HIV after receptive anal sex. Of the 3,216 reported cases of acute HCV in the U.S. in 2017, 1,059 individuals reported participating in injection drug use.

As of February 2023, according to the North American Syringe Exchange Network (NASEN), 45 states in the U.S. had some form of syringe exchange in at least one location, with the exceptions being Kansas, Mississippi, Nebraska, South Dakota, and Wyoming.

In some places, such as Seattle, Washington, foil and drug pipes are purchased at tax-payer expense for distribution to drug users.

==== Legality ====
The Federal Consolidated Appropriations Act of 2016 allows for state and local health departments to allocate federal funding from the Department of Health and Human Services (DHHS) to SEPs. However, federal funds are not permitted to be used in the purchase of syringes or needles. Health departments interested in DHHS funding for SEPs are required to consult with and present evidence to the CDC that the community they serve is either currently in or at risk for an outbreak of HIV or hepatitis infections as a direct result of syringe drug use. The use of Federal grant for the purchase of smoking supplies, such as drug pipes is prohibited. Federal law also prohibits the sale, importation and mailing of drug paraphernalia.

To ensure public safety, Roseburg, Oregon, banned the operation of syringe service program in public places such as the street, parks and sidewalks.

=== Safe consumption sites ===
A safe consumption facility, or a safe injection site, is a supervised environment in which an injection drug user can inject externally acquired substances in the presence of a licensed health care professional. On-site staff may not assist in the injection of drugs, but may provide services like wound care, overdose monitoring, and safe supply. The CDC urges drug users to never use drugs alone to lower the risk of a fatal overdose. Safe injection facilities create a space in which users do not have to inject drugs alone and are in the presence of personnel who can administer naloxone or provide emergency medical care if needed.

==== Legality ====
The Third Circuit of the U.S. Court of Appeals ruled in January 2021 that opening of a site for consumption of illegal drugs is a federal crime. This decision was rooted in the Controlled Substances Act, which bans an entity from providing a space intended for illicit drug use.

=== Medication-assisted treatment (MAT) for opioid use ===
Medication-assisted treatment (MAT) combines behavioral therapy and counseling with the use of medication. MAT is used effectively in the treatment of opioid use disorders (OUD). The U.S. Food and Drug Administration (FDA) has approved buprenorphine, methadone, and naltrexone for use in MAT.

==== Legality ====
Title 42 of the Code of Federal Regulations (CFR) Part 8 details the certification and accreditation process for opioid treatment programs. This process is overseen by SAMHSA.

=== Heroin-assisted treatment ===
Heroin-assisted treatment (HAT), also called heroin maintenance, consists of diacetylmorphine, or pharmaceutical-grade heroin, being administered in clinics under medical supervision. This treatment approach is designed for individuals who use illicit heroin but wish to stop.

The North American Opiate Medication Initiative (NAOMI) disclosed plans in 1999 for three U.S.-based sites to administer HAT as part of a randomized controlled trial of HAT, but were unable to proceed due to regulatory barriers.

==== Legality ====
Since heroin is categorized as a Schedule I drug by the U.S. Drug Enforcement Administration (DEA), it cannot be prescribed legally at this time. Schedule I drugs are considered by the DEA to lack a current medical use as well as possess a high risk of abuse.

=== Naloxone distribution ===
Naloxone, often referred to by the commercially available brand name Narcan, is an antagonist that can reverse an opioid overdose. Narcan is distributed as a nasal spray, though other forms of naloxone are administered intravenously. For example, the FDA has approved Evzio as a naloxone auto-injector, which includes verbal instructions for use. In the U.S., at least 26,500 overdoses were reversed through the administration of naloxone by civilians between 1996 and 2014.

Since its inception in 2017 through 2019, NEXT Harm Reduction distributed naloxone kits by mail to 3,609 individuals and received 335 reports of overdose reversals by naloxone provided by NEXT and its affiliates.

==== Legality ====
According to the CDC, naloxone is available in all 50 states. State laws vary in terms of immunity for legal liability in the prescription, distribution, and administration.

20 states have codified the prescription of naloxone accompanying the prescription of an opioid, known as co-prescription.

== Example projects ==
=== New York City, New York ===
Mount Sinai Hospital's Respectful and Equitable Access to Healthcare Program (REACH) received Opioid Overdose Prevention Status (OOPP) in 2017. REACH acquired funding from the New York City Department of Health and Mental Hygiene for the creation of overdose education and naloxone distribution. As a result, 4,235 naloxone kits were distributed to 3,906 individuals and REACH conducted both bystander training and clinic staff training.

On November 29, 2021, New York City officials authorized the nation's first two supervised injection facilities in Manhattan, one in East Harlem and one in Washington Heights. These sites are operated by OnPoint NYC. Former mayor Bill de Blasio authorized the center shortly before his departure and the succeeding mayor Eric Adams shows support, however the Federal prosecutor for Manhattan said the site is illegal. It remains uncertain if or what actions will be taken.

=== San Francisco, California ===
In November 1988, Prevention Point was started as an all-volunteer organization to distribute unused, sterile syringes in two neighborhoods. Prevention Point operated illegally but was not frequently disrupted by law enforcement in its early years. The client pool grew quickly, with 7,821 syringes exchanged in the spring of 1989 compared to 343,833 syringes exchanged in the spring of 1992. The prospect of a sanctioned drug consumption site in San Francisco is in doubt following the announcement related to New York City.

The San Francisco Health Commission unanimously passed a resolution adopting harm reduction as a policy on September 5, 2000. This was passed as a means for drug users' health as well as the prevention of sexually transmitted infections and HIV.

== Controversy ==
A working paper published in August 2021 suggests that expanded access to naloxone increased the distribution of fentanyl. This paper also found a positive correlation between naloxone access and the number of uses and/or potency of each use of opioids.

Dr. Laura G. Kehoe, medical director of the Massachusetts General Hospital Substance Use Disorder Bridge Clinic, shared in a U.S. News article that she believed stigma surrounding drug use to be a driving factor in the push against harm reduction initiatives.

== See also ==
- Drug Policy Alliance
