= Rhodes' Risk Environment Framework =

Rhodes’ Risk Environment Framework explains substance use harms as results of reciprocal relationships between human behavior and predominantly four environmental aspects: Physical (e.g. locations of use), Economical (e.g. health budget strains), Social (e.g. intergenerational trauma), and Political (eg. health care legislations).

According to this theory, harm reductions and interventions should consider all aspects of risk environments in relation with substance use.(Cited 768 times, according to Google Scholar) In addition to providing free equipment and SCS (Supervised Consumption Sites) to drug users, this opens new discussions such as advocating and negotiating safer use on site for example with housing providers.
