= ARCHES Lethbridge =

Non-profit organization

ARCHES (AIDS Outreach Community Harm Reduction Education Support Society)
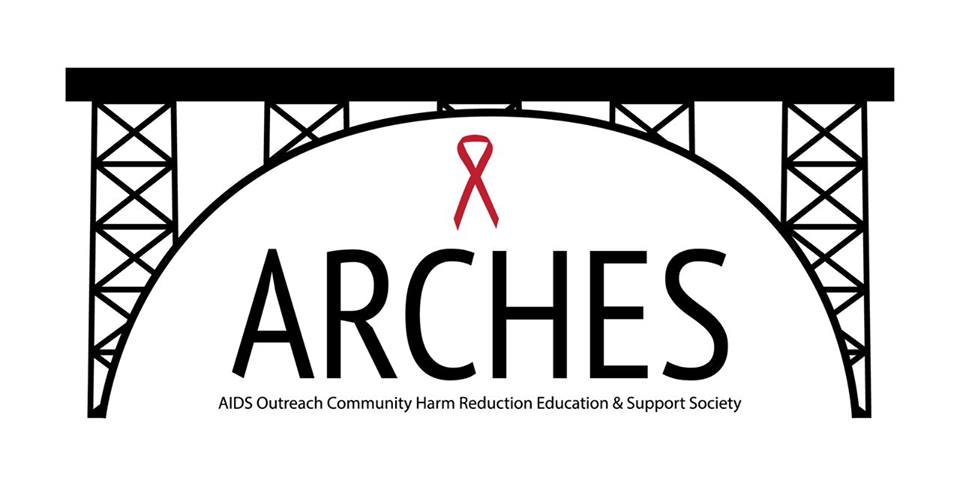
- Formation: 1986
- Type: non-profit
- Location: Lethbridge Alberta, Canada
- Coordinates: 49.697971°N 112.831537°W
- Website: lethbridgearches.com
- Formerly called: Lethbridge HIV Connection

ARCHES is a non-profit organization based in Lethbridge, Alberta, that works to reduce the harm associated with HIV/AIDS and Hepatitis C, known for operating the province-funded Lethbridge Supervised Consumption Site from February 2018 until closing in August 2020. ARCHES started in 1986, specifically focused on helping the gay community. Over time, ARCHES became a community-based organization. The SCS it operated was the busiest drug consumption site in North America. It decided to close the site following the withdrawal of government funding after an initial audit found evidence of various misappropriation of funds and lack of accounting for more than a million dollars of its funding. The concerns around unaccounted funds were investigated by Lethbridge Police Service Economics Crimes Unit, which located the missing financial records, resulting in no criminal charges.

ARCHES is an imperfect acronym which stands for AIDS OutReach & Community Harm Reduction Education & Support Society.

== Allegations of financial impropriety ==
In March 2019, the Alberta government ordered an audit after allegations of financial irregularities at ARCHES. Between October 2017 and February 2020, ARCHES received $14.5 million in grant funding from the province, which comprised 70% of their funding. ARCHES closed SCS on August 30, 2020, following the provincial government revoking funding after an initial audit found “funding misappropriation, non-compliance with grant agreement [and] inappropriate governance and organizational operations.” An audit of Lethbridge ARCHES conducted by accounting firm Deloitte showed the SCS had $1.6 million in unaccounted funds between 2017 and 2018; additionally they had found $342,943 had been expended on senior executive compensation, despite the grant agreement allowing only $80,000. Beyond this, $13,000 in interest income earned on SCS funding was spent on Christmas parties, staff retreats, entertainment and gift cards and numerous other inappropriate expenditures. The provincial government asked the Lethbridge Police Service to investigate whether criminal charges are warranted after the "audit showed gross mismanagement of the funds.". As of December 2020, the Lethbridge Police Service was able to uncover records that accounted for the funding in question.

Lethbridge ARCHES had been receiving funding from the Government of Canada and the City of Lethbridge in addition those provided from the Government of Alberta. Despite the missing funds having been recovered, issues such as expenditure on staff retreat, lack of clear policies on conflict-of-interest on hiring and vendor selection remained problematic, so the UCP Government stood by the decision to pull funding from ARCHES.

== Supervised Consumption Site (SCSs) ==
Unlike overdose prevention sites (OPS), which operate as temporary facilities established in response to urgent community public health needs, supervised consumption sites are permanent structures.

Lethbridge was one of four places in Alberta to have a supervised consumption site, which is Health Canada Criminal Code exempt. The supervised consumption site opened in February 2018 and closed in August 2020. This SCS allowed drug users to inject, smoke, snort, or take pills in the facility, making it the first of its kind in North America. Three weeks after its closure, a government agency reported that the city had seen 36% reduction in opioid related calls for emergency medical services.

ARCHES’s main facility, which included the SCS services, averaged 670 visits per day, recently averaging 20,000 visits per month. Bern, Switzerland, which is a similar size to Lethbridge and is considered to have the busiest SCS in Europe, averages about 150 to 200 visits a day.

The structure of who was in charge of SCSs was federally licensed by Health Canada, which ensures policies are followed when in operation, while it is provincially funded.

CTV News highlighted that a government review reported:

Lethbridge SCS site, operated by Arches, "may be facing the most problems in the province," adding concerns were disproportionately higher than concerns expressed at other sites.

=== Community Concerns ===
A local business owner next to ARCHES’ main location said that each morning there were liquor bottles, needles, and condoms along with trash. The business owner installed security cameras on his property, then posted the images to social media. Soon after doing so, he started receiving death threats, which local police investigated. The tension in the community continued over crime in the surrounding area around the site. There was a shared letter that stated that there had been “an increase in drug use and property crime” around the now former SCS facility, but neighbours to the former facility claim that is not true. The neighbouring business had put their building up for sale, but pulled it off the market as customer traffic returned following the SCS closure at the end of August 2020.

==== Controversy ====
Lethbridge City Councillor Blaine Hyggen brought forward a resolution to city council that the city direct ARCHES to stop distributing needles outside the site and that needles be used only within the facility; the motion was defeated by a 5-4 final count.
