= Peter Krykant =

Scottish drugs campaigner (1976–2025)

- Born: 13 November 1976
- Died: 9 June 2025 (aged 48); Larbert, Scotland

Peter Krykant (13 November 1976 – 9 June 2025) was a Scottish drugs campaigner.

== Biography ==
Krykant grew up near Falkirk in Maddiston and has described his childhood as marked by significant trauma, which shaped his early life. He began to use drugs at a young age and later began injecting heroin aged 17. He experienced homelessness and mental health crises that led to hospitalisation. Over time, Krykant made major changes in his life: building stability and a family, working successfully in sales for more than a decade in England and Scotland and later as a HIV outreach worker in Glasgow responding to the HIV outbreak in the city. He went on to become a prominent harm reduction advocate in the UK and internationally and used his experience to push for compassionate, evidence-based responses to drug related harm. One of his favourite hobbies was fishing.

He came to public attention in 2019—while Scotland was "grappling with the highest drug-related death rate in Europe". He had not taken drugs for 11 years. Having been a stay-at-home father raising his children for many years, when he returned to work, he got a job in a recovery community setting up cafes and running activities and events. In 2020, he raised over £2000 through a fund-raising appeal and with family funds and converted first a minibus, then a former ambulance, to act as an unofficial safe consumption facility in which heroin users could inject themselves. The aim was to provide "clean water, needles and swabs, as well as supplies of naloxone, the potentially life-saving drug that reverses the effects of opioid overdose". This operated as the first unsanctioned drug consumption room in the UK for nine months; the UK government had refused to sanction the facility. By providing sterile facilities, he sought to eliminate bloodborne infections like HIV and avoid deaths from overdoses. A 2022 scientific study by academics from four institutions found that he "oversaw nearly 900 injections, successfully intervening in all nine overdoses that occurred". Krykant was arrested in 2020; the charges against him were later dropped. In 2021, as part of his campaigning, he met with Nicola Sturgeon, the First Minister of Scotland and Queen Elizabeth II. He also stood as an independent candidate for the Scottish Parliament in the Falkirk East constituency that year, polling 971 votes (2.5%), coming fifth. His campaign was filmed by The Guardian.

In 2023, Scotland's Lord Advocate intervened to say that prosecutions for possession of drugs in drug consumption rooms were not in the public interest. This led to the creation of the Thistle in Glasgow's East End, the only drug consumption room in the UK, which opened in 2025. Krykant's role in the opening of this first, sanctioned drug consumption room was recognised in an early day motion which stated "That this house...recognises that his pioneering, unofficial, drug consumption van paved the way for the establishment of Britain's first official Safer Drug Consumption Facility at The Thistle in Glasgow".

== Death and legacy ==
Krykant was found dead by police officers in Larbert, on 9 June 2025. He was 48.

Following his death, tributes were paid from public figures including John Swinney, First Minister of Scotland, who said he was "deeply shocked and saddened" and that Krykant had left "an important legacy which will be remembered". Labour MSP Paul Sweeney said, "We can't underestimate the contribution he made to the drugs debate in Scotland, which came amid many years of increasing overdose deaths". Krykant's death was also noted in an early day motion in the UK Parliament supported by 11 MPs (Euan Stainbank, Wendy Chamberlain, Jim Shannon, Scott Arthur, Torcuil Crichton, Richard Baker, Charlotte Nichols, John McDonnell, Marie Rimmer, Grahame Morris, and Rachael Maskell). The motion text "celebrates Peter's pioneering work on drug reform and tireless campaigning on behalf of some of the most vulnerable in society; and notes that Peter's leadership through his mobile unit has prevented overdoses, the spread of blood-borne viruses and saved lives".
