= Thistle (drug consumption facility) =

Legal drug consumption site in Scotland

The Thistle is a drug consumption site in Glasgow, Scotland. It is the first and only legal drug consumption facility in Scotland or the United Kingdom. It opened on 13 January 2025.

The Thistle is open 365 days a year from 9am to 9pm.

== Background ==
Drug related deaths started to rise during the 1980s.

In 2002 the Home Affairs Select Committee recommended that "safe injecting houses" should be piloted.

In 2008, the Scottish National Party and the Scottish Conservatives reached a deal to pass that year's Scottish budget, where the drugs strategy would be rewritten to potentially put more stress on promoting abstinence and reduce the use of methadone.

From 2015 onwards the mortality rate of drug misuse deaths in Scotland has increased rapidly, prompting calls of a 'national emergency' within the country over the crisis.

In 2019, the Enhanced Drug Treatment Service opened in Glasgow, and offered pharmaceutical-grade heroin. This was the first such facility in Scotland and the second in the United Kingdom.

Peter Krykant set up a safe consumption room van during the COVID-19 pandemic. He oversaw nearly 900 injections by drug users in the local area within Glasgow. Krykant was charged for allegedly obstructing police who sought to search his van. Charges were later dropped.

In 2022, Labour MSP Paul Sweeney lodged the Drugs Death Prevention (Scotland) Bill, but it failed to move past the proposal stage and Conservative MSP Douglas Ross lodged the Right to Addiction Recovery (Scotland) Bill.

In 2023, Secretary of State for Scotland Alister Jack announced that the United Kingdom government would let the facility to open.

== Establishment ==
The facility was approved by Lord Advocate Dorothy Bain KC as a pilot project.

The facility is intended to reduce the number of drug deaths and to reduce the spread of HIV.

As of 7 March 2025, there have been no medical emergencies resulting from drug use at the Thistle.

== Reception ==
Recovery campaigner Annemarie Ward, of Favor UK, criticised the facility, saying it "tacitly endorses the use of hard drugs" and described it as "an admission, justification and poor defence of a failed system that doesn’t know how to help people get clean and recover".

Tory MSP Annie Wells said the Thistle would not be a silver bullet and urged the Scottish Government to support the Right to Addiction Recovery (Scotland) Bill.

Local residents have complained about public injecting, discarded needles, littered drug paraphernalia and an increase in crime since the opening of the Thistle.

Users of the facility have praised the help and support provided by the staff at the Thistle.

Cllr Allan Casey, City Convener for Addiction Services, said of the Thistle in March 2025, "It is reassuring to know how well it's running and it's reaching the population it hoped to. The team have saved lives and are helping greater numbers of people than we ever expected to in the first seven weeks of opening." ... "Lives have been saved, people who have felt marginalised and distant from support are engaging with staff and the early feedback from service users and wider partners is positive".

Saket Priyadarshi, associate medical director at NHS Greater Glasgow and Clyde said of the Thistle, "If somebody gets HIV, the lifelong treatment for HIV is so expensive that even preventing a handful of HIV infections a year, is enough to justify the cost of this service".

In July 2025, harm reduction worker Davie Findlay said, "It’s very early days, but if it had never opened up, those 30-plus people who overdosed in the Thistle would be dead".

== See also ==
- Uniting Medically Supervised Injecting Centre
