= Tracey Helton Mitchell =

American author and advocate

Tracey Helton Mitchell is an American public health worker and author. In her teens and twenties she struggled with opioid use disorder and appeared in the documentary Black Tar Heroin. Mitchell stopped using drugs at the age of 28. As of 2017 she managed a public health program in San Francisco. In 2016 she published a memoir, The Big Fix: Hope After Heroin.

Mitchell also received media attention in 2017 for mailing naloxone to drug users she connected with through web forums. At the time this was illegal, as naloxone is a prescription drug. Mitchell viewed it as an act of civil disobedience in the midst of an opioid overdose epidemic. Mitchell is on the board of NEXT Harm Reduction, which does similar work, inspired by her example.

Mitchell is an alumna of San Francisco State University, earning a bachelor's degree in business administration in 2005 and a master's in public administration in 2007. Mitchell is married and has three children. She lives in Daly City.
