= NEXT Harm Reduction =

American non-profit focussed on harm reduction

- Formation: 2017
- Type: Nonprofit
- Tax ID no.: 83-1333112
- Purpose: Opioid overdose prevention program
- Headquarters: New York
- Website: https://nextdistro.org/
- Formerly called: NEXT Distro

NEXT (Needle EXchange Technology) Harm Reduction is an American nonprofit that sends naloxone, sterile syringes, and other harm reduction supplies through the mail. It is based in the state of New York but serves clients throughout the country. It is the first formal mail-delivered harm reduction service in the US.

== History ==
NEXT began operations in February 2018. Jamie Favaro, the organization's founder, previously worked for the Harm Reduction Coalition, the Washington Heights Corner Project (which she founded in 2005) and other harm reduction groups. The program design was influenced by the work of Tracey Helton, who had been mailing naloxone to drug users illegally as an act of civil disobedience. In its first two and a half years of operation, NEXT distributed syringes to more than 800 people. It experienced a spike in demand during the first months of the COVID-19 pandemic, as brick-and-mortar syringe service programs shut down.

== Funding ==
As of 2021, NEXT relied primarily on private donations, but it had also received some funding from the Delaware Department of Health, the New York City Department of Health and Mental Hygiene, and other health departments.
