= Black Tar Heroin (film) =

- Directed by: Steven Okazaki
- Music by: Cat Power; Belly; Mr. T Experience; Team Dresch; Varnaline; Space Needle; Eve Bekker; Karl Goldring
- Country of origin: United States
- Original language: English

Production
- Producer: Steven Okazaki
- Cinematography: Steven Okazaki
- Running time: 75 minutes

Original release
- Release: 1999

Black Tar Heroin: The Dark End of the Street is a 1999 television documentary film directed by Steven Okazaki. Filmed from 1995 to 1998 in the Tenderloin, San Francisco, California, the documentary describes the lives of heroin addicts.

== Overview ==
The film follows a simple structure, and shows the drug-related degradation of five youths (Jake, Tracey, Jessica, Alice and Oreo) during the course of three years. The film depicts their drug-related crimes and diseases, including prostitution, AIDS, and lethal overdoses.

In a 2004 follow up interview with Tracey Helton, she reveals she is now a full-time drug counselor, while Jessica is still working as a prostitute despite having HIV. Alice McMunn has been sober since 02.20.01; she is a model and professional exotic dancer. Oreo's whereabouts are unknown; his girlfriend Jennifer went to treatment. After she relapsed, she later died from a drug-induced asthma attack while on Shotwell St. in San Francisco. Her friend, Kari Guilinger, attempted to give her CPR with the help of a FoodsCo employee while waiting for paramedics to arrive, but they were unable to save her life. She was pronounced dead upon arrival at Davies County Hospital. Jake overcame his heroin addiction and began methadone treatment. Shortly after stopping his methadone and the break-up with his first clean and sober girlfriend, Jake was found dead of a drug overdose in January 2002. Tracey's boyfriend, Ben, died of an overdose just one week after being released from jail on a burglary charge.

In a further update on YouTube, Tracey known as traceyh415, revealed she had earned a master's degree, married and become a mother to three kids; as of July 2015 update, she stated she was 16 years clean. She has written one book already and has a second one "The Big Fix: Hope After Heroin" on the way. Tracey works in the community she used to use drugs in, helping others who suffer from addiction.

Tracy Helton posted a comment on the 2004 update video on YouTube that reads as follows: "Oreo, Jessica, Alice, and myself are all clean. Posting this comment on 3/23/14."

== Release ==
- The film was produced by HBO and was frequently shown in 1999 on the channel, as part of their "America Undercover" series, becoming one of its top-rated documentaries.
- The documentary received a theatrical release on March 17, 2000, at San Francisco's Roxie Theatre, and is still available on DVD.

== Soundtrack ==
Songs featured in the film:

- Good Clean Fun – Cat Power
- Sweet Ride – Belly
- Don't Try Suicide – Team Dresch
- She's Coming Over – Mr. T Experience
- Long Goodbye – Ovarian Trolley
- Some Foggy Mountain Top – Mr. T Experience
- Why Are You Unkind – Varnaline
- Never Lonely Alone – Space Needle
- Dark End of the Street – Eve Bekker & Karl J. Goldring
