= Sam Rivera =

American harm reduction activist

- Occupations: Nonprofit executive; Harm reduction advocate
- Organization: Executive Director of OnPoint NYC (2020-)
- Awards: Time 100 2023

Sam Rivera is an American activist and nonprofit executive of Afro-Taino descent. He became known for serving as the Executive Director of harm reduction-focused nonprofit OnPoint NYC in 2020, and led its creation of the first two safe injection sites in the United States in NYC in November 2021. For his work leading OnPoint, he was named to the Time 100 in 2023.

== Biography ==
Rivera was convicted of a drug and gun charge in his early 20s. During his time in prison, he noticed a broken window in a room where several ill men were and reported it. He was immediately whisked to a quarantine room and made to sign a waiver: those men had HIV/AIDS. Ultimately, he wound up volunteering to read to them and help them write letters to their family. He was freed from prison in 1990, and two years later went to work for the Fortune Society, a prison re-entry nonprofit, as an advocate.

After rising to the role of Associate Vice President for Housing at the Fortune Society, he became the Executive Director of two organizations then in the middle of merging: the Washington Heights Corner Project and the New York Harm Reduction Educators. After merging, the two became known as OnPoint NYC and Rivera became the new organization's Executive Director.

In 2021, Bill de Blasio authorized the opening of the first two Supervised injection sites in the United States by OnPoint under Rivera's leadership. During just the first few months of the sites being open under Rivera's leadership, these sites reversed over 100 overdoses. By late 2025, that number had reached over 1900. Rivera's vision also focused on holistic care at these sites, including laundry, mental health, acupuncture, showers, and drug testing.

The center has faced political trouble, though: though all three Mayors during OnPoint's sites have supported them (de Blasio, Eric Adams and Zohran Mamdani), in 2025 Nicole Malliotakis, a congresswoman from Staten Island, asked the Department of Justice to shut them down. Rivera, however, reaffirmed his commitment to these supervised injection sites.

He was named to the Time 100 in 2023: his profile in Time 100 was written by Beth Macy. He also won the David Prize for individuals with the best ideas to create a better NYC in 2023, and received the Legal Action Center's Edward J. Davis Community Service Award that same year.

== Personal life ==
He is of Afro-Taino descent, and cited his uncle, a Puerto Rican activist, as one of his biggest inspirations.
