= OnPoint NYC =

New York City nonprofit that operates safe injection sites

- Formation: 2021
- Merger of: New York Harm Reduction Educators, Washington Heights Corner Project
- Type: Nonprofit
- Purpose: safe injection sites and other harm reduction services
- Leader: Sam Rivera
- Staff: ~120 (2023)
- Website: onpointnyc.org

OnPoint NYC is a New York City nonprofit that operates two privately run safe injection sites in East Harlem and Washington Heights. At the sites, drug users use illegal drugs under supervision. Placed at the sites of existing syringe service programs, these were America's first safe injection facilities when they opened in November 2021.

== History ==
OnPoint was created in 2021 from the merger of two existing groups, New York Harm Reduction Educators and Washington Heights Corner Project. OnPoint's workers voted to unionize with UNITE HERE in December 2022. Between 2021 and 2025 OnPoint's own record reports over 1,700 overdoses were reversed with no resulting deaths. By December 2025, more than 46 clients were taken to the hospital by ambulance, however OnPointNYC did not track whether or not they survived.

New York mayor Bill de Blasio had been advocating for the city to open safe injection sites since 2018. The opening of OnPoint's OPCs is one demonstration of a shift toward harm reduction in American drug policy, prompted by a worsening opioid overdose crisis and an illicit drug supply containing high levels of fentanyl. Under President Joe Biden, the United States Department of Justice has taken a hands-off approach to safe injection sites, although possession of opioids without a prescription remains illegal. On August 7, 2023, the top federal prosecutor for Manhattan announced OnPoint's activities are illegal, because it is a violation of federal law to maintain property where controlled substances are consumed.

Some Harlem activists and politicians (including Al Taylor, Inez Dickens, Yusef Salaam, Rev. Al Sharpton and Adriano Espaillat) have criticized the Harlem site, viewing it as part of an oversaturation of shelters and addiction treatment facilities in the neighborhood. A December 2021 protest in Harlem against the site drew over 100 people. Gothamist and WNYC reviewed 2019–2020 data of opioid clinic usage in Harlem and found that only 25% of patients were Harlem residents.

Some Harlem residents have also complained of increased crime (including drug dealing and public drug use) in the area since the site opened. The New York Times reported visible drug activities around the block at OnPoint's E 126th St location in August, 2023. The consumption site is across the street from a child care center. OnPoint also employs staff to collect discarded drug paraphernalia in parks and other public areas.

Opponents posit that the center encourages illegal drug use. In February 2025, congresswoman Nicole Malliotakis sent a letter to the attorney general requesting the center be shut down.

== Funding ==
OnPoint has received funding from the New York City Department of Health and Mental Hygiene, The New York Community Trust and the New York Health Foundation, among other sources. As of June 2022 it had received no state or federal funding. Counseling, syringe service programs and other services offered around the consumption sites receive city and state funding, but the consumption sites are privately funded.

== Research ==
In 2023 NYU Langone Health and Brown University announced that OnPoint would be included in the first federally-funded study to evaluate the effectiveness of OPCs. This study will be funded by NIDA.

== See also ==
- Harm reduction in the United States
