= Supervised injection site =

Medical facility

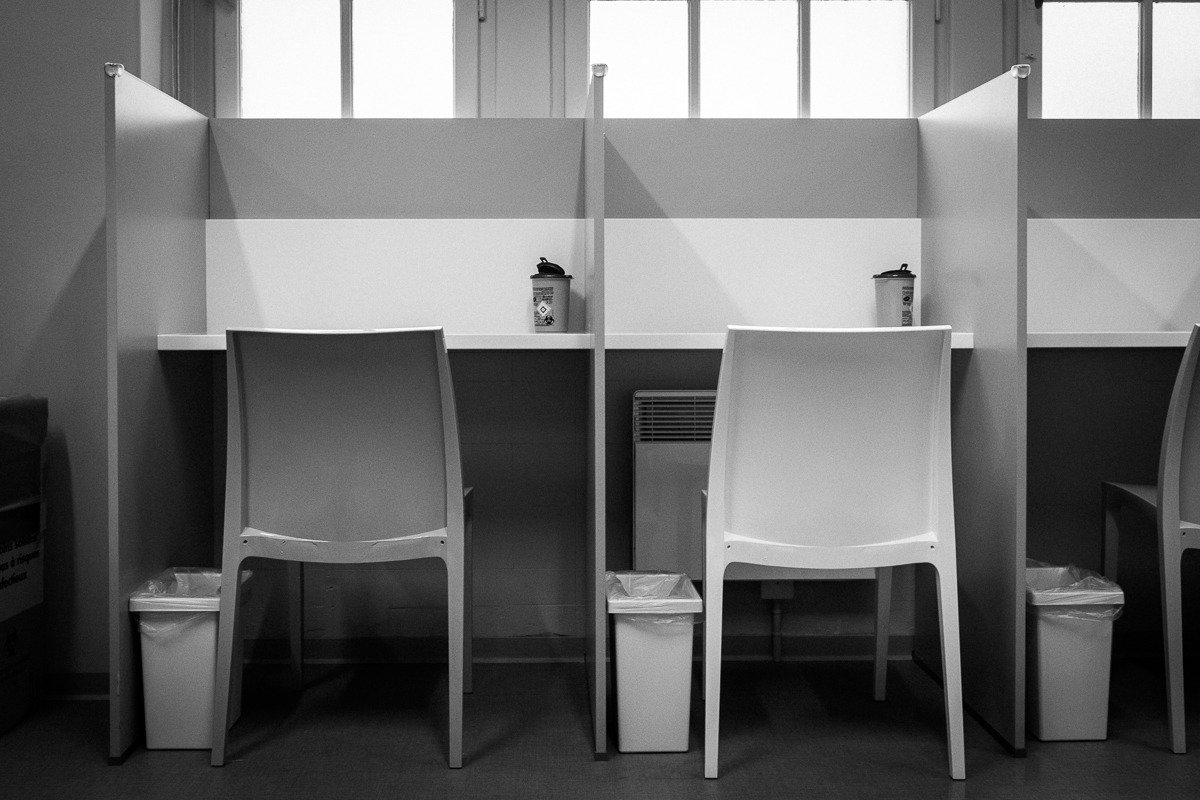
Cubicles for drug injection at a supervised injection site in Strasbourg

Supervised injection sites (SIS) or drug consumption rooms (DCRs) are a health and social response to drug-related problems. They are fixed or mobile spaces where people who use drugs are provided with sterile drug use equipment and can use illicit drugs under the supervision of trained staff. They are usually in areas where there is an open drug scene and where injecting in public places is common. The primary target group for DCR services are people who engage in risky drug use. The first drug consumption facility opened in Bern, Switzerland in 1986.

The geographical distribution of DCRs is uneven, both at the international and regional levels. In 2022, there were over 100 DCRs operating globally, with services in Belgium, Denmark, France, Germany, Greece, Luxembourg, the Netherlands, Norway, Portugal and Spain, as well as in Switzerland, Australia, Canada, Mexico and the United States.

Primarily, DCRs aim to prevent drug-related overdose deaths, reduce the acute risks of disease transmission through unhygienic injecting, and connect people who use drugs with addiction treatment and other health and social services. There have been no recorded deaths at any legal supervised injection site. They can also aim to minimise public nuisance.

Proponents say they save lives and connect users to services, while opponents believe they promote drug use and attract crime to the community around the site. Supervised injection sites are part of a harm reduction approach towards drug problems.

== Terminology ==
Supervised injection sites are also known as overdose prevention centers (OPCs), supervised injection facilities, safe consumption rooms, safe injection sites, safe injection rooms, fix rooms, fixing rooms, safer injection facilities (SIF), drug consumption facilities (DCF), drug consumption rooms (DCRs), medically supervised injecting centres (MSICs) and medically supervised injecting rooms (MSIRs).

== Facilities ==
=== Australia ===
The legality of supervised injection is handled on a state-by state basis. New South Wales trialed a supervised injection site in Sydney in 2001, which was made permanent in 2010. After several years of community activism, Victoria agreed to open a supervised injection site in Melbourne's North Richmond neighbourhood in 2018 on a trial basis. In 2020 the trial was extended for a further three years, and the site remains open as of 2024.

A second site for Melbourne's CBD was approved and was to be placed in a building on Flinders Street which had previously housed Yooralla. However, as of 2024, the site has been rejected by Premier Jacinta Allan who cited disagreements over location, preferring to set up a new community health and pharmacotherapy centre instead.

=== Europe ===
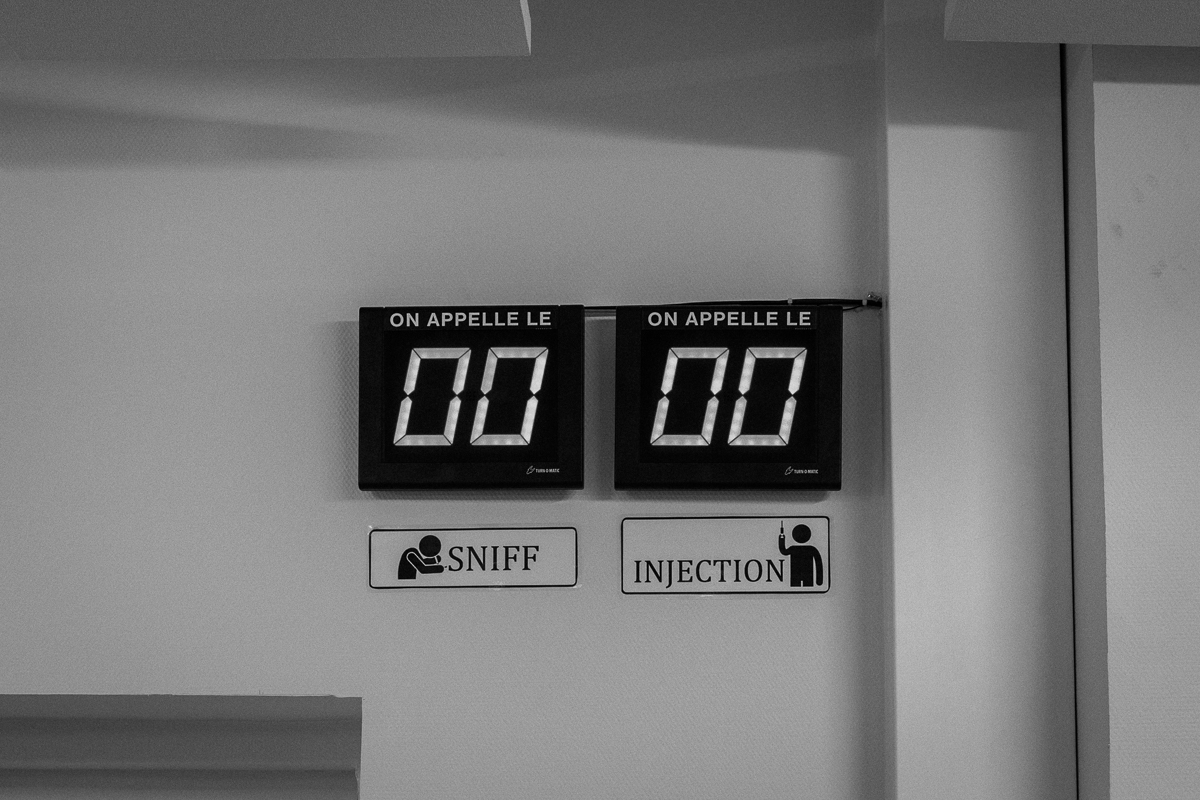
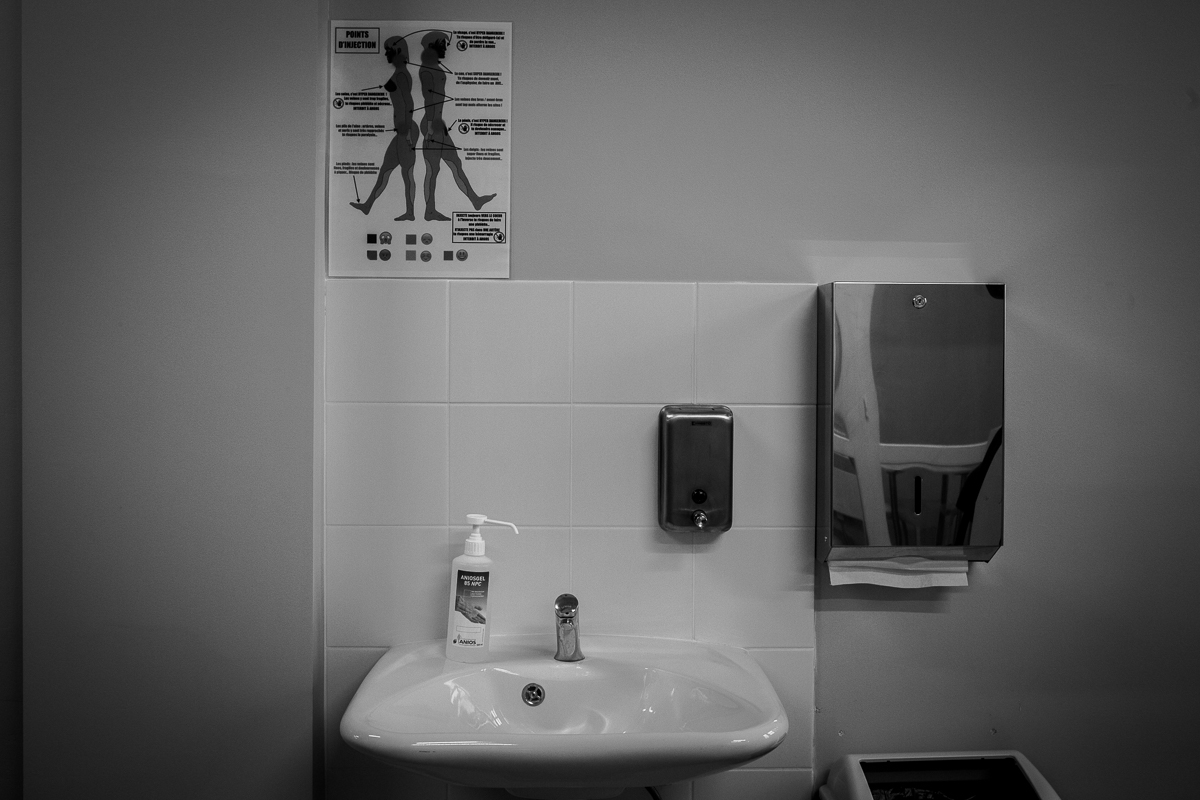
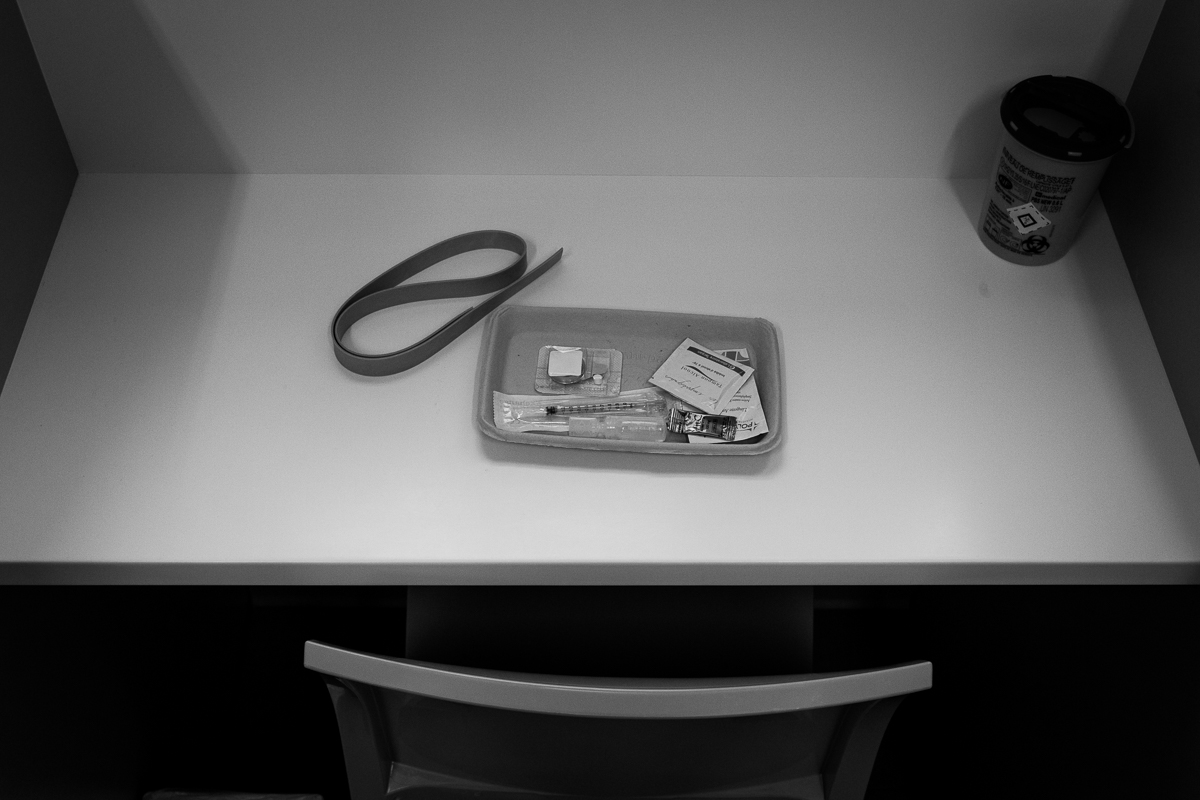
Facilities at a safe injection sites in Strasbourg, France, taken in November 2016

During the 1990s legal facilities emerged in cities in Switzerland, Germany and the Netherlands. In the first decade of 2000, facilities opened in Spain, Luxembourg, and Norway.

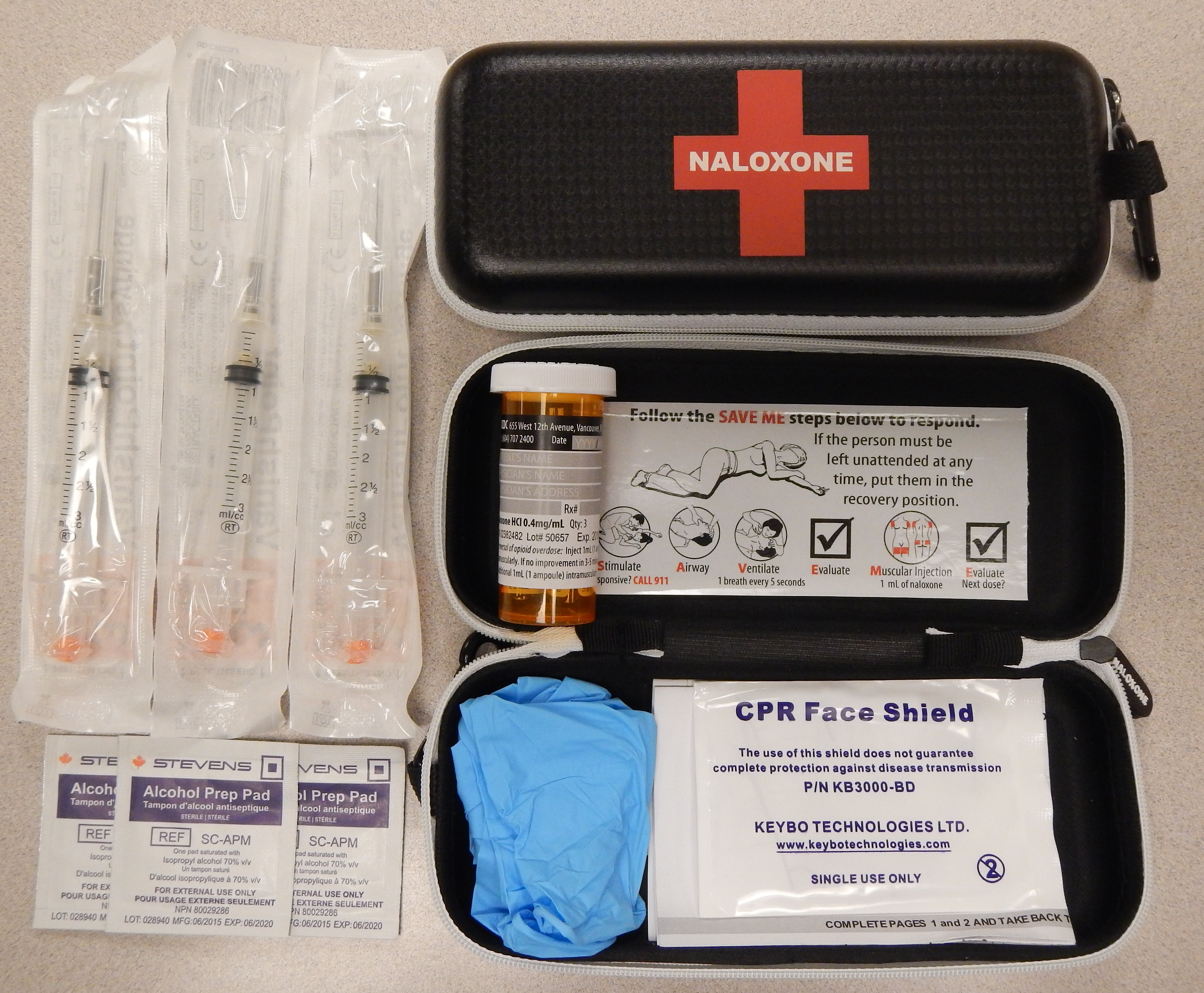
Naloxone, a drug on hand at clinics used to administer in cases of opioid overdose

Whereas injection facilities in Europe often evolved from something else, such as different social and medical outreaches or perhaps a homeless shelter, the degree and quality of actual supervision varies. The history of the European centers also mean that there have been no or little systematic collection of data needed to do a proper evaluation of effectiveness of the scheme. At the beginning of 2009 there were 92 facilities operating in 61 cities, including 30 cities in the Netherlands, 16 cities in Germany and 8 cities in Switzerland. Denmark passed a law allowing municipalities to run "fix rooms" in 2012, and by the end of 2013 there were three open.

To date in July 2022, according to European Monitoring Centre for Drugs and Drug Addiction Belgium has one facility, Denmark five, France two, Germany 25, Greece one, Luxembourg two, Netherlands 25, Norway two, Portugal two, Spain 13, and Switzerland 14.

==== Ireland ====
Legislation to permit the opening of a service was passed in the Misuse of Drugs (Supervised Injecting Facilities) Bill 2017; the first centre opened in Dublin in 2024.

==== Netherlands ====
The first professionally staffed service where drug injection was accepted emerged in the Netherlands during the early 1970s as part of the "alternative youth service" provided by the St. Paul's church in Rotterdam. At its peak it had two centers that combined an informal meeting place with a drop-in center providing basic health care, food and a laundering service. One of the centers was also a pioneer in providing needle-exchange. Its purpose was to improve the psychosocial function and health of its clients. The centers received some support from law enforcement and local government officials, although they were not officially sanctioned until 1996.

==== Switzerland ====
The first modern supervised consumption site was opened in Bern, Switzerland in June 1986. Part of a project combatting HIV, the general concept of the café was a place where simple meals and beverages would be served, and information on safe sex, safe drug use, condoms and clean needles provided. Social workers providing counselling and referrals were also present. An injection room was not originally conceived, however, drug users began to use the facility for this purpose, and this soon became the most attractive aspect of the café. After discussions with the police and legislature, the café was turned into the first legally sanctioned drug consumption facility provided that no one under the age of 18 was admitted.

==== United Kingdom ====
The United Kingdom opened one (officially unsanctioned) facility in Glasgow in September 2020. It was opened by Peter Krykant, a local drugs worker; however, lack of funding and support led to its closure in May 2021. In nine months of operation, 894 injection events were recorded at the facility and volunteers reported attending to nine overdose events, seven opioid overdoses, and two involving powder cocaine; but there were no fatalities.

In 2023, the Lord Advocate—Scotland's chief legal officer—announced that the Crown Office and Procurator Fiscal Service would institute a policy of not criminally prosecuting those using approved supervised drug consumption sites. Police Scotland have also confirmed they will exercise discretion in not prosecuting those using such a facility. An official facility, The Thistle, opened in Glasgow in January 2025.

=== Latin America ===
The first site opened in Latin American was in Bogota, Colombia during October 2024.

=== North America ===
==== Canada ====
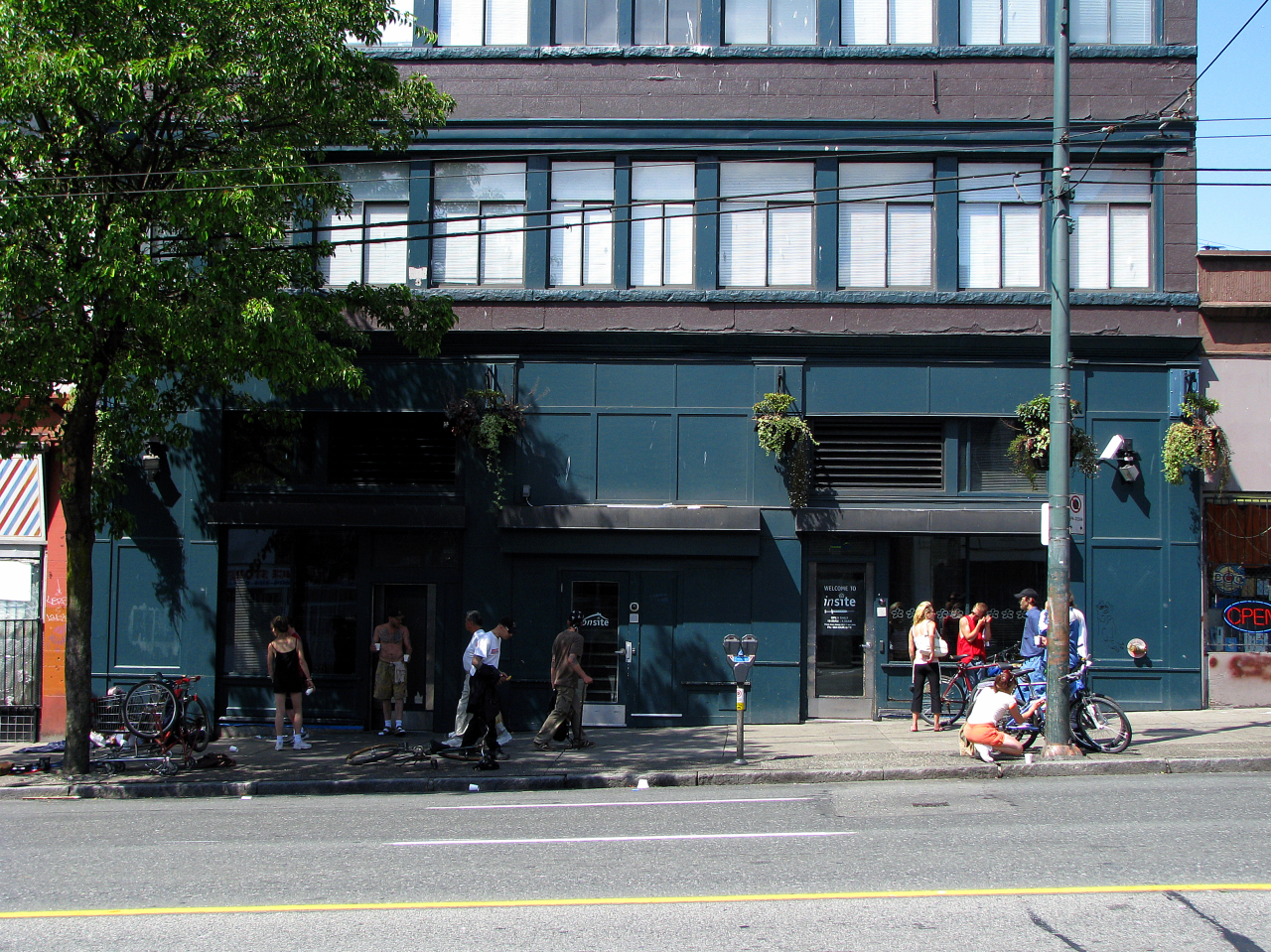
Insite in 2008

There are 39 government authorized SCS in Canada as of July 2019: 7 in Alberta, 9 in British Columbia, 19 in Ontario, and 4 in Quebec. An exemption to controlled substances law under Canadian Criminal Code is granted inside the facilities, but drug possession remains illegal outside the facility and there is no buffer zone around the facility. Canada's first SCS, Insite in Downtown Eastside of Vancouver, commenced operation in 2003.

===== Alberta =====
In August 2020, ARCHES Lethbridge in Lethbridge, Alberta, the largest SCS in North America, closed shortly after Alberta revoked their grant for misuse of grant funds. Shortly after opening in February 2018, ARCHES Lethbridge found itself repetitively necessitating police intervention and/or emergency medical services for opioid-related issues; three weeks after its closure, the city noted a 36% decline in opioid-related EMS requests. The average per-capita operating cost of government sanctioned sites are reported to be CAD$600 per unique-client, with the exception of the ARCHES Lethbridge which had a disproportionately high cost of CAD $3,200 per unique client.

In September 2020, a group in Lethbridge, Alberta led by an ARCHES employee started hosting an unauthorized SCS in public places in a tent. The group did not have authorizations to operate an SCS or a permit to pitch a tent in the park. The organizer was issued citations for the tent; and the Lethbridge Police Service advised that users utilizing the unauthorized SCS would be arrested for drug possession because exemptions do not apply to unauthorized sites. This opening of this illegal drug consumption tent was controversial and became a subject of discussion at the City Council meeting.

===== Ontario =====
Ontario has scheduled to close ten drug SCS by end of March 2025 and further establishment of SCS has been banned.

==== United States ====
Clandestine injection sites have existed for years. A New England Journal of Medicine study from July 2020 reports that an illegal supervised consumption site has been operating at an "undisclosed" city in the U.S. since 2014 where over 10,000 doses of illegal drugs have been injected over a five-year period. Supervised consumption sites with some degree of official sanction from a state or local government are rare due to the federal regulation of drugs and the explicit opposition of federal law enforcement to any form of decriminalization.

Local governments in Seattle, Boston, Vermont, Delaware, and Portland, Oregon have considered opening safe injection sites as well. Plans to open an injection site in Somerville, Massachusetts in 2020 were delayed by the COVID-19 pandemic.

The governors of California and Vermont both vetoed supervised consumption site bills in 2022, and Pennsylvania's Senate voted for a ban on them in 2023.

===== Denver (2018) =====
In November, 2018, Denver city council approved a pilot program for a safe injection site with a 12-to-1 vote. The Drug Enforcement Administration's Denver field office and the United States Attorney's office for the District of Colorado issued a statement together on the proposed site stating that "the operation of such sites is illegal under federal law. 21 U.S.C. Sec. 856 prohibits the maintaining of any premises for the purpose of using any controlled substance."

===== New York City (2021) =====
The first government-authorized supervised injection sites in the US (operated by OnPoint NYC under executive director Sam Rivera) began operating in New York City in November 2021.

A peer-reviewed study of the first two months of the OPC's operation has been published in JAMA.

Public criticism of the New York City OPC's has so far been limited. One problem brought up by the leadership of the Metropolitan Transportation Authority is how use migrates from the centers to nearby New York City Subway stations when the OPC's are closed. In response Mayor Eric Adams called for the centers to be funded to operate continuously.

Though sanctioned by the city, the sites arguably remain illegal under federal law and rely on non-enforcement by federal officials to keep operating. The United States Department of Justice, during the Presidency of Joe Biden, signaled some openness and stated that it is "evaluating supervised consumption sites, including discussions with state and local regulators about appropriate guardrails for such sites, as part of an overall approach to harm reduction and public safety".

===== Pennsylvania =====
An organization called Safehouse was hoping to open a safe consumption site in Philadelphia in February 2020 with the support of the city government. Immediate neighbors strongly objected to the site, and the owner of the first proposed location withdraw a lease offer under pressure. United States District Attorney William McSwain sued to stop the Safehouse project, losing in district court in October 2019, but winning an injunction in January 2021 from a 3-judge panel of the United States Court of Appeals for the Third Circuit. Safehouse said its proposed operation was "a legitimate medical intervention, not illicit drug dens" and claimed protection under the Free Exercise Clause because "religious beliefs compel them to save lives at the heart of one of the most devastating overdose crises in the country".

The Pennsylvania Senate has passed at least two bills banning supervised injection sites anywhere within the state. Pennsylvania Senate Bill 165 was passed in May 2023 with a 41-9 vote and died in committee at the House. The Pennsylvania governor Josh Shapiro expressed support for that bill. Pennsylvania Senate Bill 347 was passed in April 2025. As of November 2025 it is pending consideration by the House Judiciary Committee.

===== San Francisco, California =====
For 11 months between January and December 2022, drug addicts used within the center established by the health department. The center was created by repurposing a social services linking service.

=== Virtual overdose monitoring services / non physical site ===
Virtual overdose monitoring services are similar to safe consumption rooms. These programs use phone lines or smartphone apps to monitor clients while they use drugs, contacting emergency services if the caller becomes unresponsive. These services include the National Overdose Response Service in Canada and SafeSpot Overdose Hotline in the United States.

== Evaluations ==
Globally there have been no recorded deaths at any legal supervised injection site. Supervised injection sites generally appear to be associated with reduction in morbidity, improvement in access to addiction treatment, and no increase in crime.

In the late 1990s a number of studies on consumption rooms in Germany, Switzerland and the Netherlands "concluded that the rooms contributed to improved public and client health and reductions in public nuisance but stressed the limitations of the evidence and called for further and more comprehensive evaluation studies into the impact of such services". To that end, the two non-European injecting facilities, Australia's Sydney Medically Supervised Injecting Centre (MSIC) and Canada's Vancouver Insite Supervised Injection Site have had more rigorous research designs as a part of their mandate to operate.

Safe injection sites help improve public safety by reducing the number of improperly discarded needles in public. This was found to be the case in a report by the Canadian Mental Health Association in 2018. Prior to the establishment of a supervised injection site in Vesterbro, Copenhagen in Denmark in 2012, up to 10,000 syringes were found on its streets each week. Within a year of the supervised injection site opening this number fell to below 1,000.

=== SIS sites and social disorder ===
A longitudinal study – Urban Social Issues Study (USIS) – from January 2018 and February 2019 – undertaken by University of Lethbridge's professor Em M. Pijl and commissioned by the City of Lethbridge, Alberta, Canada explore "any unintended consequences" of supervised consumption services (SCS) within the "surrounding community". The USIS study was undertaken in response to a drug crisis in Lethbridge that impacted "many neighbourhoods in many different ways." Researchers studied the "perceptions and observations of social disorder by business owners and operators" in a neighborhood where SCS was introduced. The report cautioned, that drug abuse-related antisocial behavior in Lethbridge, in particular, and in cities, in general, has increased, as the "quantity and type of drugs in circulation" increases. As the use of crystal meth eclipses the use of opiates, users exhibit more "erratic behavior". Crystal meth and other "uppers" also "require more frequent use" than "downers" like opiates. The report also notes that not all social disorder in communities that have a SCS, can be "unequivocally and entirely attributed" to the SCS, partly because of the "ongoing drug epidemic." Other variables that explain increased anti-social behaviour includes an increase in the number of people aggregating outdoors as part of seasonal trends with warmer temperatures.

Philadelphia's WPVI-TV Action News team traveled to Toronto, Canada in 2018 to make first hand field observations of several safe consumption sites already in operation. A drug addict interviewed by the reporter said she visits the site to obtain supply, but did not stick around and used the supplies to shoot up drugs elsewhere and acknowledged the site attracts drug users and drug dealers. A neighbor interviewed by the reporter said there was drug use before, but he reports it has increased since the site opened.

WPVI-TV's Chad Pradelli narrated the news team's observation as:

Over the two days we sat outside several of Toronto's safe injection facilities, we witnessed prevalent drug use out front, drug deals, and even violence. We watched as one man harassed several people passing by on the sidewalk, even putting one in a chokehold. One guy decided to fight back and security arrived.

==== Sydney, Australia ====
The Sydney MSIC client survey conducted in 2005, found that public injecting (defined as injecting in a street, park, public toilet or car), which is a high risk practice with both health and public amenity impacts, was reported as the main alternative to injecting at the MSIC by 78% of clients. 49% of clients indicated resorting to public injection if the MSIC was not available on the day of registration with the MSIC. From this, the evaluators calculated a total 191,673 public injections averted by the centre.

==== Vancouver, Canada ====
Observations before and after the opening of the Vancouver, British Columbia, Canada Insite facility indicated a reduction in public injecting. "Self-reports" of INSITE users and "informal observations" at INSITE, Sydney and some European SISs suggest that SISs "can reduce rates of public self-injection."

==== Alberta, Canada ====
In response to the opioid epidemic in the province of Alberta, the Alberta Health Services's (AHS), Alberta Health, Indigenous Relations, Justice and Solicitor General including the Office of the Chief Medical Examiner, and the College of Physicians and Surgeons of Alberta met to discuss potential solutions. In the November 2016 Alberta Health report that resulted from that meeting, the introduction of supervised consumption services, along with numerous other responses to the crisis, was listed as a viable solution. The 2016 Alberta Health report stated that, SIS, "reduce overdose deaths, improve access to medical and social supports, and are not found to increase drug use and criminal activity."

===== Calgary: Safeworks Supervised Consumption Services (SCS) =====
Safeworks was at the Sheldon M. Chumir Health Centre, which operated for several months, as a temporary facility, became fully operational starting April 30, 2018 with services available 24 hours, 7 days a week. From the day it initially launched in October 30, 2017 to March 31, 2019, 71,096 people had used its services The staff "responded to a total of 954 overdoses." In one month alone, "848 unique individuals" made 5,613 visits to the SCS. Its program is monitored by the Province of Alberta in partnership with the Institute of Health Economics.

In the City of Lethbridge's commissioned 2020 102-page report, the author noted that "Calgary's Sheldon Chumir SCS has received considerable negative press about the "rampant" social disorder around the SCS, a neighbourhood that is mixed residential and commercial." According to a May 2019 Calgary Herald article, the 250 meter radius around the safe consumption site Safeworks in Calgary within the Sheldon M. Chumir Centre has seen a major spike in crime since its opening and described in a report by the police as having become "ground zero for drug, violent and property crimes in the downtown." Within this zone, statistics by the police in 2018 showed a call volume increase to the police by 276% for drug related matters 29% overall increase relative to the three-year average statistics. In May 2019, the Calgary Herald, said that Health Canada announced in February 2019 of approval for Siteworks to operate for another year, conditional to addressing neighborhood safety issues, drug debris and public disorder. There has been a plan for mobile safe consumption site intending to operate in the Forest Lawn, Calgary, Alberta, however in response to the statistics at the permanent site at the Sheldon M. Chumir Centre, community leaders have withdrawn their support.

By September 2019, the number of overdose treatment at Safeworks spiked. The staff were overwhelmed and 13.5% of their staff took psychological leave. They have had dealt with 134 overdose reversals in 2019 which was 300% more than the same time period from the previous year. The center's director reported they're dealing with an average of one overdose reversal every other day.

===== Lethbridge: ARCHES (Closed August 2020) =====
In response to the mounting death toll of drug overdose in Lethbridge, the city opened its first SCS in February, 2018. The controversial SCS, known as ARCHES was once the busiest SCS in North America.

The province defunded ARCHES after an audit ordered by government discovered misuse and mismanagement of public monies. Around 70% of ARCHES funding comes from the province, and it chose to shut it down on August 31, 2020 after the funding was revoked. The audit found "funding misappropriation, non-compliance with grant agreement [and] inappropriate governance and organizational operations." The Alberta government requested that the site be investigated for possible criminal misuse of funds. Shortly afterwards, Lethbridge Police Service announced that the funds, which had previously been reported as missing, had been present and accounted for in bank accounts belonging to the SCS. Acting Inspector Pete Christos stated that the initial auditors did not have the means to determine whether money was missing, and confirmed that, during police interviews with Arches staff, all spent funds had been accounted for. Police Chief Shahin Mehdizadeh told reporters that the Alberta Justice Specialized Prosecutions Branch supported the police's findings and were not recommending criminal charges.

The City of Lethbridge commissioned a report that included an Urban Social Issues Study (USIS) which examined unintended consequences of the SIS site in Lethbridge. The research found that in smaller cities, such as Lethbridge, that in communities with a SCS, social disorder may be more noticeable. The report's author, University of Lethbridge's Em M. Pijl, said that news media tended to the "personal experiences of business owners and residents who work and/or live near an SCS", which contrasts with "scholarly literature that demonstrates a lack of negative neighbourhood impacts related to SCSs."

==== Financial impropriety by SCS service providers ====
An audit of Lethbridge ARCHES SCS by accounting firm Deloitte, ordered by the Alberta provincial government, found the SCS had $1.6 million in unaccounted funds between 2017 and 2018; additionally they found that led $342,943 of grant funds had been expended on senior executive compensation despite the grant agreement allowing only $80,000. Beyond this, an additional $13,000 was spent on parties, staff retreats, entertainment and gift cards, and numerous other inappropriate expenditures.

The Lethbridge Police Service and Alberta Justice Specialized Prosecutions Branch later stated that all funds were present and accounted for in accounts belonging to the agency. When asked why these funds had previously been reported as missing, LPS Acting Inspector Pete Christos stated that the initial auditors did not have the means to investigate the agency's finances, and that all spending had been accounted for during the criminal probe.

Premier Jason Kenney did not dispute the results of the investigation, declined to reinstate funding, and claimed that the site's management had lost the confidence of his government.

=== Impact on community levels of overdose ===
Over a nine-year period the Sydney MSIC managed 3,426 overdose-related events with not one fatality while Vancouver's Insite had managed 336 overdose events in 2007 with not a single fatality.

The 2010 MSIC evaluators found that over 9 years of operation it had made no discernible impact on heroin overdoses at the community level with no improvement in overdose presentations at hospital emergency wards.

Research by injecting room evaluators in 2007 presented statistical evidence that there had been later reductions in ambulance callouts during injecting room hours, but failed to make any mention of the introduction of sniffer dog policing, introduced to the drug hot-spots around the injecting room a year after it opened.

A March 2025 study exploring the association of safer supply and decriminalization policy with opioid overdose outcomes in British Columbia, Canada, found that neither policy "appeared to mitigate the opioid crisis, and both were associated with an increase in opioid overdose hospitalizations."

=== Site experience of overdose ===
While overdoses are managed on-site at Vancouver, Sydney and the facility near Madrid, German consumption rooms are forced to call an ambulance due to naloxone being administered only by doctors. A study of German consumption rooms indicated that an ambulance was called in 71% of emergencies and naloxone administered in 59% of cases. The facilities in Sydney and Frankfurt indicate 2.2-8.4% of emergencies resulting in hospitalization.

Vancouver's Insite yielded 13 overdoses per 10,000 injections shortly after commencement, but in 2009 had more than doubled to 27 per 10,000. The Sydney MSIC recorded 96 overdoses per 10,000 injections for those using heroin. Commenting on the high overdose rates in the Sydney MSIC, the evaluators suggested that,

In this study of the Sydney injecting room there were 9.2 (sic) heroin overdoses per 1000 heroin injections in the centre. This rate of overdose is higher than amongst heroin injectors generally. The injecting room clients seem to have been a high-risk group with a higher rate of heroin injections than others not using the injection room facilities. They were more often injecting on the streets and they appear to have taken greater risks and used more heroin whilst in the injecting room.

=== People living with HIV/AIDS ===
The results of a research project undertaken at the Dr. Peter Centre (DPC), a 24-bed residential HIV/AIDS care facility in Vancouver, were published in the Journal of the International AIDS Society in March 2014, stating that the provision of supervised injection services at the facility improved health outcomes for DPC residents. The DPC considers the incorporation of such services as central to a "comprehensive harm reduction strategy" and the research team concluded, through interviews with 13 residents, that "the harm reduction policy altered the structural-environmental context of healthcare services and thus mediated access to palliative and supportive care services", in addition to creating a setting in which drug use could be discussed honestly. Highly active antiretroviral therapy (HAART) medication adherence and survival are cited as two improved health outcomes.

=== Crime ===
The Sydney MSIC was judged by its evaluators to have caused no increase in crime and not to have caused a 'honey-pot effect' of drawing users and drug dealers to the Kings Cross area.

Observations before and after the opening of Insite indicated no increases in drug dealing or petty crime in the area. There was no evidence that the facility influenced drug use in the community, but concerns that Insite 'sends the wrong message' to non-users could not be addressed from existing data. The European experience has been mixed.

== See also ==
- Drug checking
- Needle and syringe programmes
- Reagent testing
