= Lethbridge Police Service =

- Patch

- Logo
- Motto: Providing Safe Communities

Agency overview
- Formed: 1902; 124 years ago
- Volunteers: 50 as of 2017

Jurisdictional structure
- Operations jurisdiction: Canada
- Legal jurisdiction: Municipal

Operational structure
- Headquarters: Lethbridge, Alberta
- Sworn members: 172 as of 2017
- Unsworn members: 61 as of 2017
- Elected officer responsible: The Honourable Mickey Amery, Minister of Justice and Solicitor General
- Agency executive: Shahin Mehdizadeh, chief of police

Facilities
- Stations: 1

Website
- www.lethbridgepolice.ca

The Lethbridge Police Service, formerly known as the Lethbridge Regional Police Service, was established in 1902, and serves the city of Lethbridge, a community in southern Alberta of approximately 101,482 in its 2019 municipal census.

== History ==
At its establishment in 1902, the Lethbridge Police Service staffed two constables and served a population of about 2,000. Thomas "the Just" Lewis was appointed its chief of police. In 2009, the service employed 155 officers, 47 civilian staff, and over 40 civilian volunteers to serve a population of 92,435.

In its history, two officers have been killed in the line of duty, Acting Sergeant Paul Smith in 1913 and Constable Cal Byam in 1964.

On May 4, 2020, a video of a 19-year-old woman dressed in a Star Wars stormtrooper uniform being taken down and arrested by Lethbridge police gained international attention. The woman was carrying a toy Star Wars blaster on Star Wars Day in front of a Star Wars themed restaurant. The police, in collaboration with the Alberta Serious Incident Response Team initiated an investigation into the incident. The investigation concluded in December 2020, and resulted in no criminal charges against the involved officers. A further external investigation cleared the officers of any wrongdoing.

In July 2020, two members of the Lethbridge Police Service were demoted for inappropriately using police resources in 2017 to follow and photograph Alberta NDP MLA Shannon Phillips, then the Minister of Environment and Parks of Alberta. Phillips was in the process of meeting with stakeholders in the lead-up to the formation of Castle Provincial Park, where the two officers had an interest in off-road vehicle driving. One of the officers took photos of the meeting and ran a police check on the stakeholder; the photo was later published on Facebook under a pseudonym alongside criticism of the NDP government. After an investigation by the Medicine Hat Police Service, charges were laid against the two officers, who admitted to them.

== Lethbridge Regional Police Commission ==
The service is governed by a nine-person commission composed of three members of the Lethbridge City Council and six citizens. The commission oversees the service, allocates funds from the council and establishes policing policies. They provide instruction to the police chief regarding sufficient staffing levels.

== Organization ==
The head of the service is Chief Shahin Mehdizadeh, who has over 35 years of policing experience, primarily with the Royal Canadian Mounted Police (RCMP). The executive officers heading the service's three divisions are Inspector Russell Lawrence, Inspector Jason Walper, and Inspector Robin Klassen.

== Rank ==
The rank structure consists of the following:

RANKS	Chief of police	Deputy chief	Inspector	Staff sergeant	Sergeant	Senior constable	Constable
Insignia							No insignia

== Training ==
As of 2005, newly hired officers must complete the Police Recruit Training Program through the Centre for Advancement in Community Justice, located at the Lethbridge Polytechnic.

== Structure ==
The organization of the police service includes four divisions: community policing, criminal investigation, administrative support and support services.

=== Community policing ===
The community policing division is mandated to maintain the peace, protect life and property, and the prevention and detection of crime. It is composed of the following units:

- Patrol services
- Downtown policing
- Traffic safety
- Court liaison
- Community resource
- Victim services

=== Criminal investigation ===
The criminal investigation division provides support services to ongoing investigations through the dissemination of intelligence and investigation assistance. Units in the division include:

- Violent crime
- Forensic identification
- Crime analysis
- Property crime
- Serious habitual offenders
- Special operations
- Criminal intelligence
- Economic crime
- National weapons enforcement
- Gaming and liquor enforcement

=== Administrative support ===
The administrative support division oversees the following areas:

- Human resources
- Professional standards
- Policy and accreditation
- Property and exhibits
- Business management

=== Support services ===
The support services division provides support to all other divisions as required, including a specialized response to ongoing crises and ensuring the continuous flow of information. This division includes:

- Public safety communications
- Information technology
- Records management
- Tactical unit
- Canine unit
- Explosive disposal unit

== Fleet ==
=== Patrol ===
- Ford Taurus Police Interceptor Marked and Unmarked
- Ford Crown Victoria Police Interceptor
- Ford F-150 Pickup Truck
- Ram 1500 Pickup Truck (marked and stealth units)
- Chevrolet Silverado Pickup Truck
- Dodge Charger New addition in 2019
- Ford Transit van (downtown policing unit)

=== Traffic and photo radar ===
- Ram 1500 pursuit pickup truck
- Chevrolet Silverado pickup truck
- Ford F-150 pickup truck
- Buick Enclave SUV
- Dodge Grand Caravan
- Victory Commander I motorcycle

=== Special use ===
- GMC Yukon (supervisor)
- Chevrolet Impala (school resource officers)
- Dodge Grand Caravan (forensics)
- Ford Transit van (forensics)
- Chevrolet Tahoe Marked and Stealth (canine)

== Equipment ==
Officers were equipped with SIG Sauer P226 pistols in .40 S&W. In 2019, Lethbridge Police Service purchased Glock 17 Gen 5's in 9mm to replace the P226.

== See also ==
- Alberta Law Enforcement Response Teams
